= MF Hamperokken =

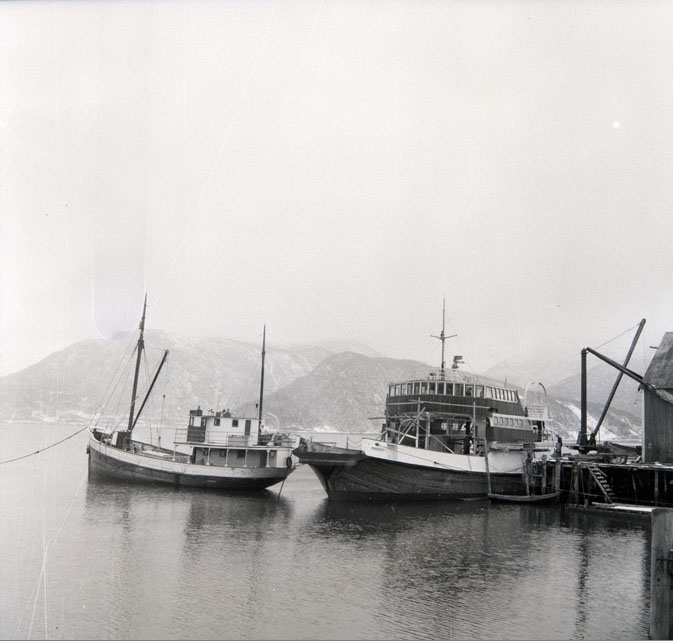
- Lyngen – Riksvei 50 (right) at Rognan in 1959

History
- Name: MF Lyngen – Riksvei 50 (1949–64); MF Hamperokken (1964–91)
- Namesake: Lyngen; Hamperokken
- Owner: Bjørklids Ferjerederi (1949–64)
- Operator: Bjørklids Ferjerederi (1949–64)
- Port of registry: Tromsø
- Route: Lyngseidet–Olderdalen; Svensby–Breivikeidet
- Ordered: 1948
- Builder: Johan Drage
- Cost: NOK 500,000
- Yard number: 327
- Completed: 1949
- Identification: IMO number: 8879278; Call sign: LHIR
- Fate: Unknown

General characteristics
- Type: Ferry
- Tonnage: 485 GRT / 202 NRT
- Length: 31.9 m (105 ft)
- Beam: 10.2 m (33 ft)
- Draught: 3.3 m (11 ft)
- Installed power: 184 kW (250 hp) (1949–64); 239 kW (325 hp) (1964–)
- Propulsion: Union semidiesel; Caterpillar diesel
- Speed: 9 kn (17 km/h; 10 mph)
- Capacity: 20 cars; 200 passengers

MF Lyngen – Riksvei 50, from 1964 MF Hamperokken, was a wooden, single-direction roll-on/roll-off passenger and roach vehicle ferry. She had a capacity for 20 cars and 200 passengers.

Built by Johan Drage in 1949, she was used by Bjørklids Ferjerederi, first on the Lyngseidet–Olderdalen and later the Svensby–Breivikeidet routes. She underwent a major renovation, enlargement and received a new engine in 1963 and 1964. From 1974 she became a reserve ferry, and was sold in 1978. She later was used for construction logistics and then as a base for a fish farm. She sank in 1991.

== Specifications ==
The vessel was a wooden, single-direction, roll-on/roll-off passenger and car ferry, with a capacity for 20 cars and 200 passengers. She had a length of 31.9 meters (105 ft), a beam of 10.2 meters (33 ft) and a draught of 3.3 meters (11 ft). This gave her her a register tonnage of 189 gross and 75 net, which increased to 196 and 78, respectively, from 1963.

The originally had a four-cylinder Union semidiesel from De Forenede Motorfabrikker, giving a power output of 184 kW (250 hp). From 1964, she had a Caterpillar diesel with 239 kW (325 hp). In both configurations she had a speed of 9 knots (17 km/h; 10 mph).

== History ==
The vessel was the first ship of Bjørklid. The proprietor, Kjell Andreas Bjørklid, won a tender for the Lyngseidet–Olderdalen service in 1948. He therefore ordered a ferry from Johan Drage in Rognan. A major issue was the financing of the ferry, but through contacts, Bjørkli was able to raise the necessary half a million Norwegian kroner needed. Named MF Lyngen – Riksvei 50, she was put into service ahead of the 1949 summer season. She operated this route for eleven years. Traffic was heavy during the summer, with the ferry often having to run around the clock. During winter there was almost no traffic and only two daily round trips.

Bjørkeli was awarded the Svensby–Breivikeidet route. A new ferry, MF Jæggevarre, was ordered for the Lyngen crossing, and Lyngen – Riksvei 50 moved to the less trafficked new service. Bjørkelid leased MF Haalogaland from 1963. This allowed Lyngen to be taken out of service for a major upgrade. She was rebuilt in 1963, and the next year a new Caterpillar diesel engine was installed. She was renamed Hamperokke, after a local mountain, a name she would retain for the rest of her life.

The section of E6 along the east shore of Lyngen opened in 1974, creating a fixed link for the E6 along Lyngen. Traffic on the Lyngseidet–Olderdalen route fell overnight by 40 percent, as traffic heading south no longer needed to cross the fjord. This reduced the number of ferries needed. MF Goalsevarre was moved from Lyngen to Ullsfjorden, and Hamperokken could be retired.

The ship was sold to Willy Høgås of Tromsø in 1978. A year later she was sold onwards to Hans Møllersen of Mo i Rana. He used her for logistics during the construction of Gimsøystraumen Bridge and associated sections of road in Lofoten. She was then sold to Ørneslaks in 1984. They moved her to Ørnes and used her as a base for a fish farm.

The ship sank in while being towed near Sandnessjøen on 24 July 1991.
