= MF Salangen =

MF Salangen was the name of two ships:

- MF Ladejarl (1966), known as MF Salangen between 1979 and 1987
- MF Goalsevarre (1972), known as MF Salangen between 2004 and 2017
