= MF Goalsevarre =

MF Goalsevarre was the name of two ships:

- MF Goalsevarre (1972)
- MF Goalsevarre (1982)
