= Leonora Masima Noel =

Grenadian Longevity claimant (1901–2021)

- Noel on her 119th Birthday with Minister of Carriacou and Petite Martinique Kindra Maturine Stewart
- Born: 10 December 1901; Venezuela
- Died: 24 September 2021 (aged 119); Carriacou
- Known for: Supposedly being the oldest citizen of Grenada and the British commonwealth at 119
- Children: 5

Leonora Masima Noel (10 December 1901 [uncertain] – 24 September 2021) was an unverified Venezuelan-born Grenadian supercentenarian who died at the claimed age of 119 years and 288 days old. If verified she would be the second oldest person ever behind verified Jeanne Calment.

== Life and Longevity ==
Leonora Masima Noel was born in Venezuela. When she was 7 years old her mother died in childbirth and so her father brought her back to L’Esterre in Carriacou, Grenada, living in a straw hut. As an adult she worked crushing stones to be used to pave roads. She had 5 children, as of 2020, two were deceased and three were alive. In 2016 for her 114th Birthday she received a Birthday telegram from Queen Elizabeth II. She lived with her octogenarian eldest daughter and also in 2016 welcomed her first great-great-grandchild. On her 119th birthday she was visited by the Minister of Carriacou and Petite Martinque Kindra Maturine-Stewart. She died on the 24 September 2021 from COVID-19 at the purported age of 119 years old. At the time of her death she was widely regarded as the oldest citizen in Grenada, and oldest in the British Commonwealth.
