= MF Jæggevarre =

MF Jæggevarre has been the name of two ferries:

- MF Jæggevarre (1960)
- MF Jæggevarre (2002)
