= Bjørklids Ferjerederi =

Norwegian shipping company

Bjørklids Ferjerederi AS
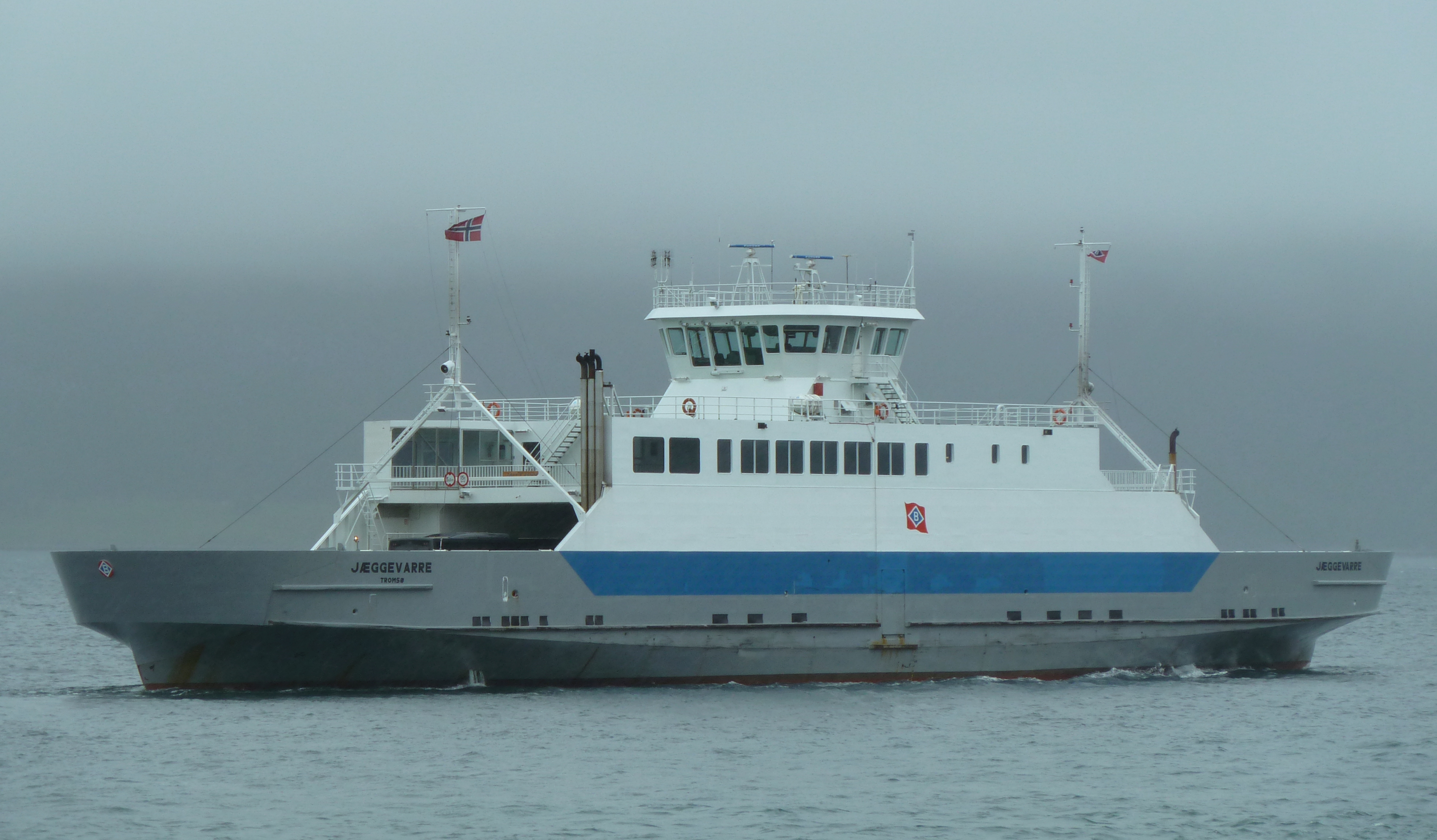
- MF Jæggevarre
- Company type: Private
- Industry: Shipping
- Founded: 1949
- Founder: Kjell Bjørklid
- Defunct: December 31, 2020
- Fate: Dissolved
- Headquarters: Lyngseidet, Norway
- Area served: Troms
- Products: Lyngseidet–Olderdalen Ferry; Breivikseidet–Svensby Ferry
- Owner: Bjørklid family

Bjørklids Ferjerederi AS was a shipping company which operated passenger and road vehicle ferries in Troms, Norway, between 1949 and 2020. It operated two main services, the Lyngseidet–Olderdalen Ferry across Lyngen and the Breivikseidet–Svensby Ferry across Ullsfjorden.

== History ==
=== Establishment on Lyngen ===
The shipping company was started by Kjell Andreas Bjørkli in 1949. Bjørkli was from Malangen, but settled in Gratangen. In addition to running a farm, he worked as a captain on one of the ferry operated by Fergeforbindelsen, where he also was a partial owner.

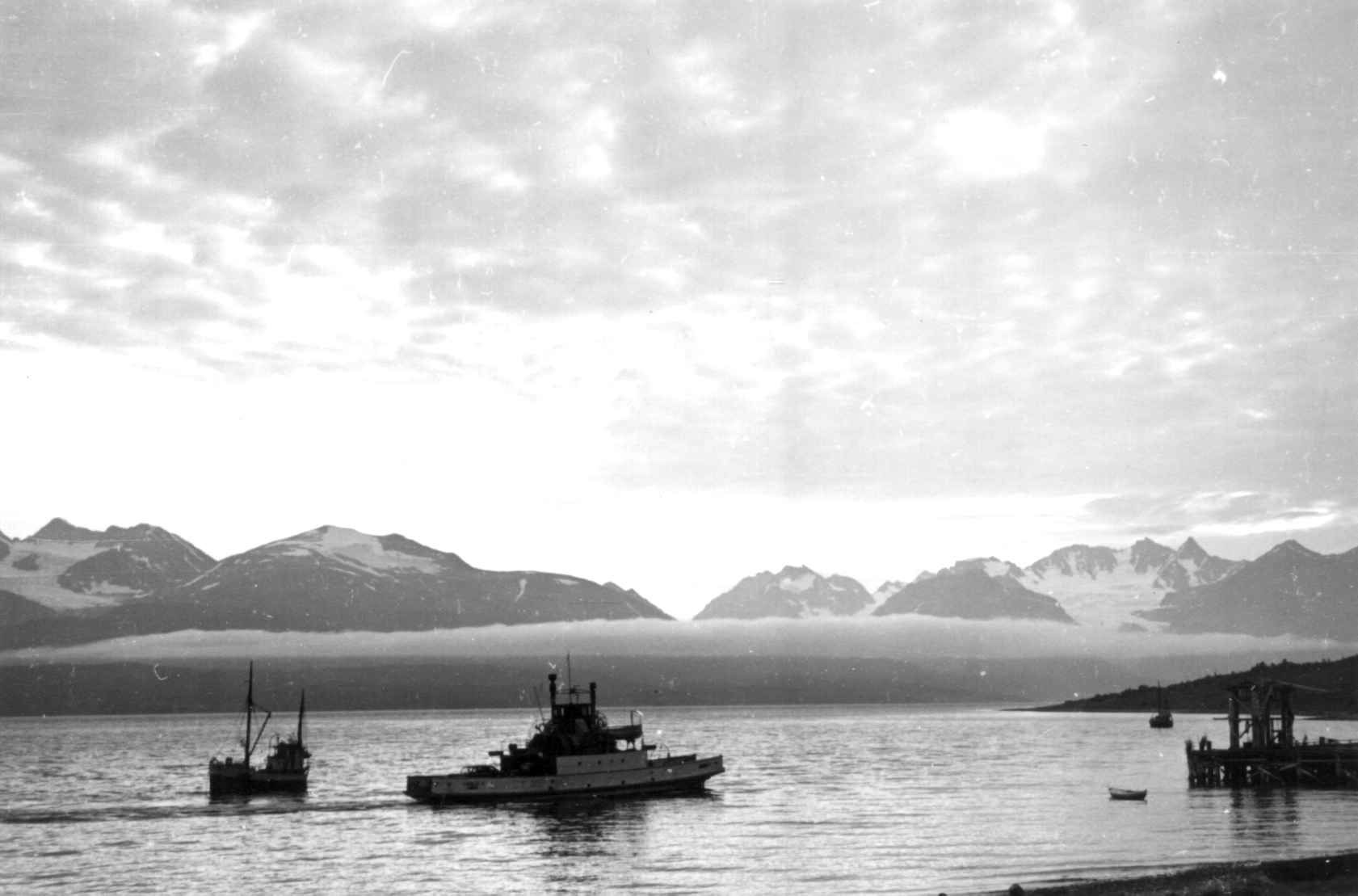
Ferry approaching Olderdalen in 1947

The ferry service across Lyngen had operated since 1938 as a passenger service, and since 1940 as a vehicle ferry. The Norwegian Public Roads Administration was no longer interested in operating it itself, and wanted to put the operations out on a tender. The major steamship company in the area, Troms Fylkes Dampskibsselskap, who would over time would operate most of the car ferries in Troms, was at the time not interested in entering the road vehicle ferry business, and chose not to bid. Bjørklid was therefor successful.

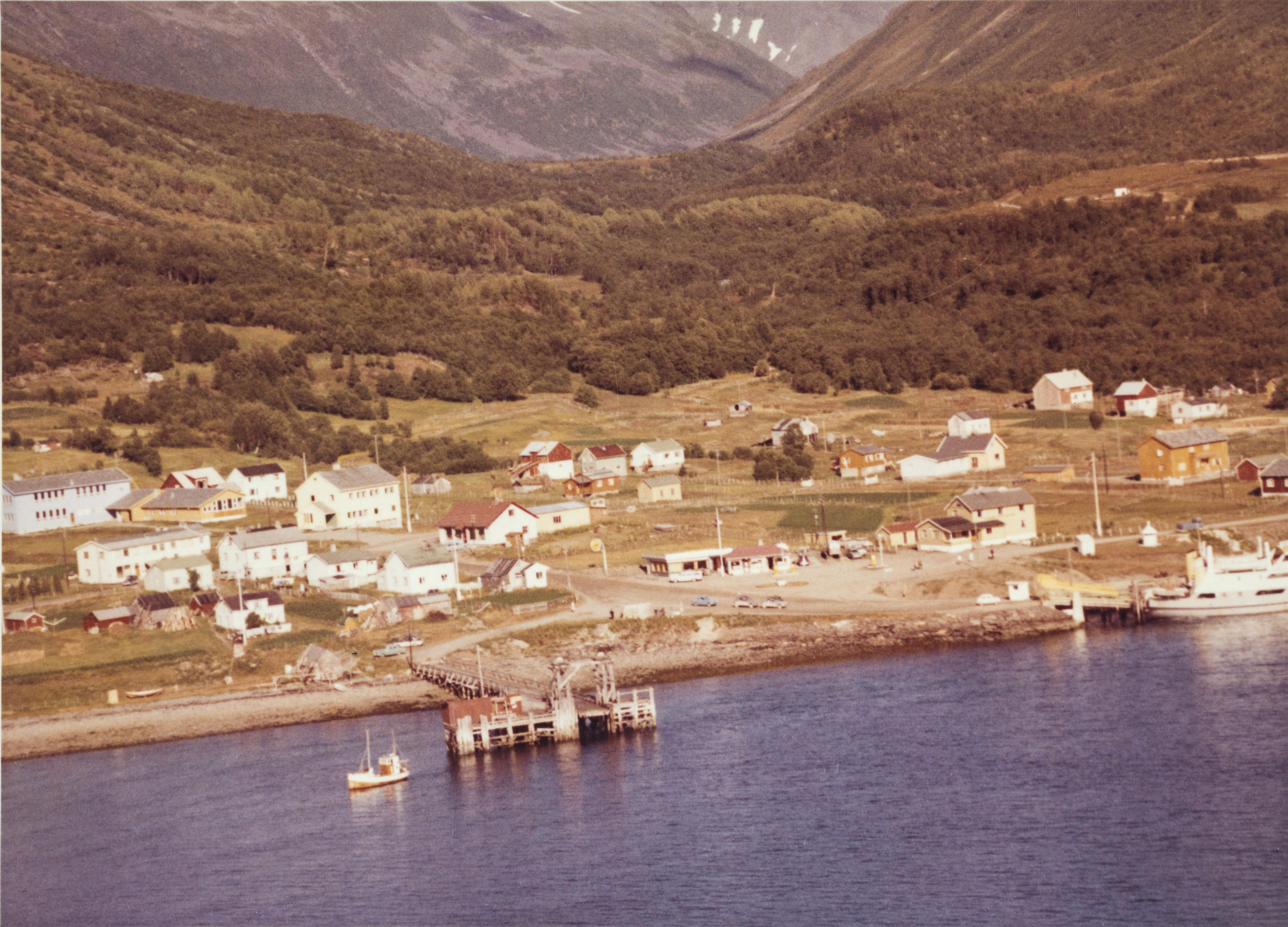
Olderdalen in 1963, with MF Jæggevarre docked at quay

The Lyngseidet–Olderdalen Ferry was originally part of National Route 50, since 1965 European Route E6. At the time the current road on the east shore of Lynget was not built, so the ferry was part of the main route from both Northern Troms and Finnmark both to Tromsø and further south.

Bjørkli bought a new ferry, which was built at Johan Drage in Rognan. Named Lyngen–Riksvei 50, she had a capacity of 20 cars. A major issue was the financing of the ferry, but through contacts, Bjørkli was able to raise the necessary half a million Norwegian kroner needed.

Most of the traffic in the early years was passengers. There were ticket prices for various animals, such as goats, sheep, cows and reindeer. Car traffic was largely seasonal, and dominated by tourist traffic during the summer. Especially during the late 1950s, traffic grew so much that it became clear that a new ferry had to be ordered.

=== Expansion with Ullsfjorden service ===
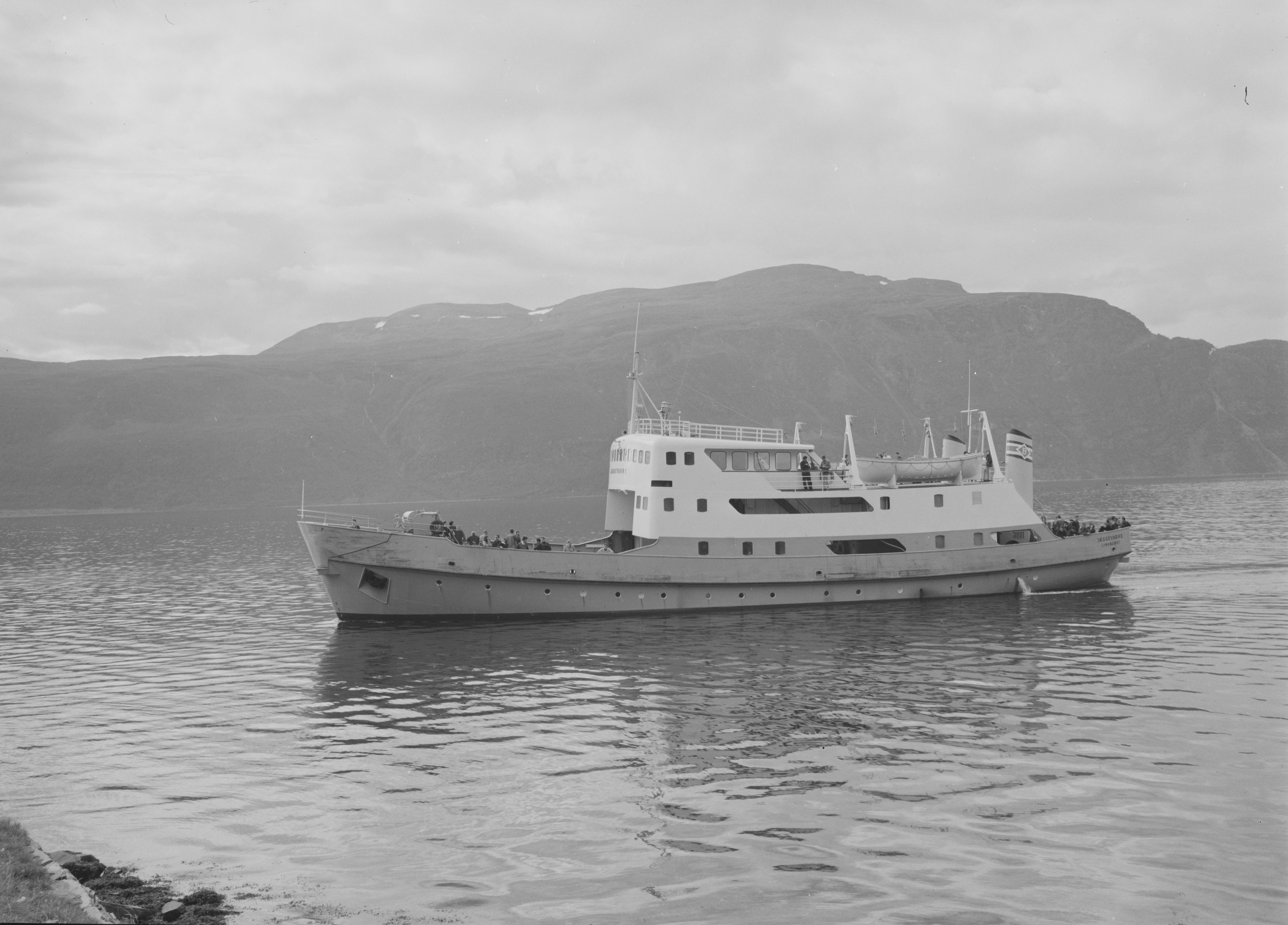
MF Jæggevarre approaches Olderdalen in 1963

The Breivikseidet–Svensby Ferry began operation as a passenger-only service in 1946. Proper quays to load cars were built by the Road Administration between 1958 and 1960, allowing for a car ferry to start on the route. In addition to local traffic, this allowed for a significant short-cut for cars coming from Northern Troms and Finnmark heading to Tromsø. Bjørklid was awarded the concession for the upgraded ferry service.

Bjørkeli ordered a new ferry, MF Jæggevarre, which was delivered on 1 July 1960. It had capacity for 30 cars and 250 passengers, as well as featuring a lounge, kafé and kiosk. The new ferry was put into service on the busier Lyngen route, while Lyngen–Riksvei 50 was moved to the new route across Ullsfjorden.

As it became evident that also the older ferry was too small, Bjørkelid borrowed the ferry MF Haalogaland from the Public Roads Administration from 1963, before buying it outright four years later. This allowed Lyngen–Riksvei 50 to be updraded in length and beam and receive a new engine. It was then renamed Hamperokken. Haalogaland was kept on as a reserve ferry for both routes.

Along Lyngen, a seasonal ferry service was intermittently introduced between Lyngseiet and Furuflaten. This was needed to avoid avalach risk during winter, and was operated as needed.

=== Second generation takes over ===
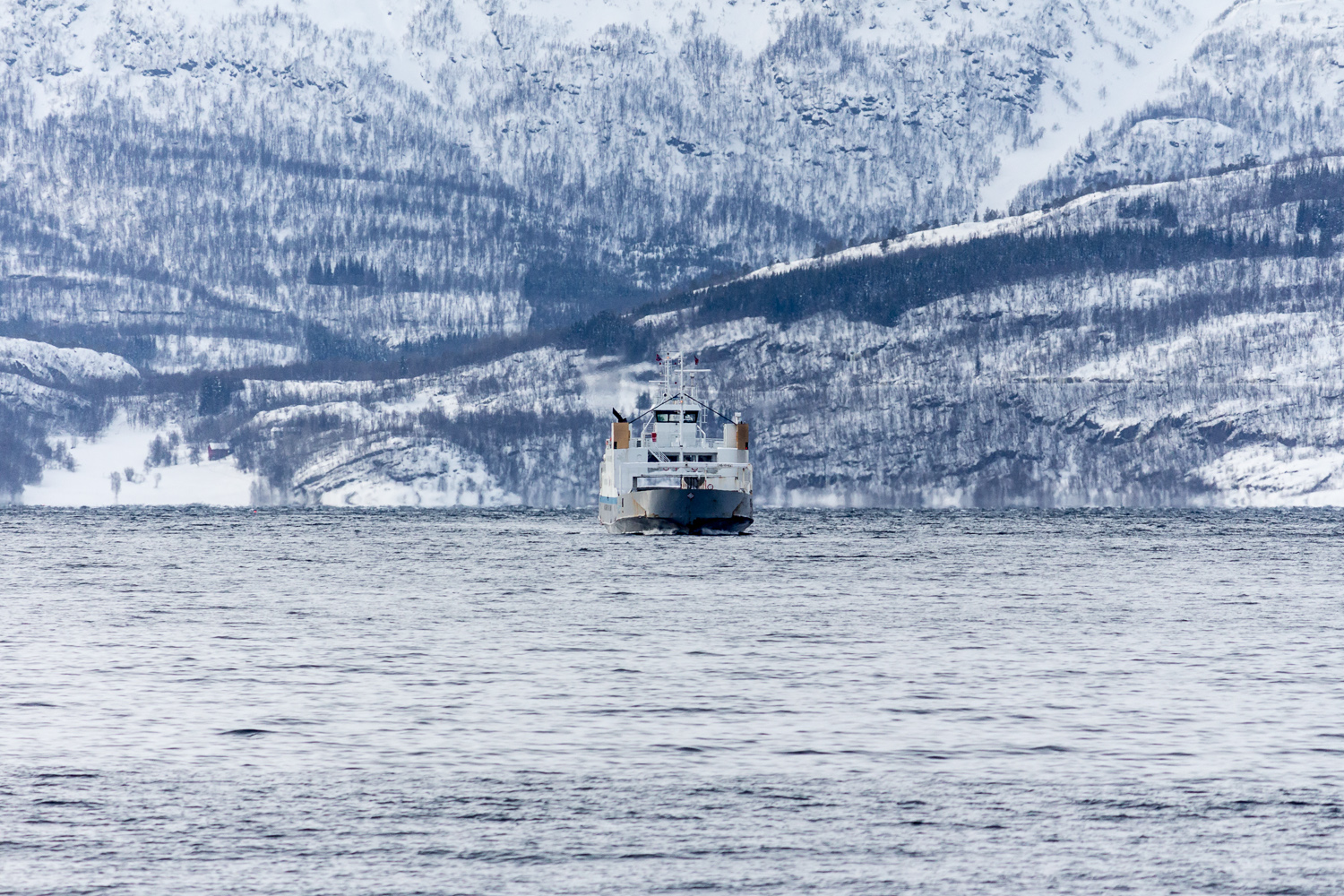
Crossing of Lyngen

Kjell Bjørklid died in 1966, and ownership of the company passed to his two sons, Mikal H. and Per Bjørklid. The former became the new managing director. While previously a sole prorietorship, the company was reorganised as a shipping partnership.

A fourth ferry, MF Bjorelvnes, was bought in 1966. It only had capacity for four cars and was initially used to transport school children from Samulesberg and Nordnes to Olderdalen. From 1967 it was moved to Ullsfjorden, where it connected Jøvik to Svensby and Breivikeidet. Bjorelvnes was sold in 1976.

Traffic continued to increase, and by the late 1960s it was becoming difficult to keep operations flowing. At the worst, waiting times at Lyngseidet and Olderdalen were up to five hours. A second ferry was needed on the route, and Bjørklid therefor bought the new ferry MF Goalsevarre with delivery in June 1972. It had a capacity for 32 cars and 250 passengers.

The section of E6 along the east shore of Lyngen opened in 1974, creating a fixed link for the E6 along Lyngen. Traffic fell overnight by 40 percent, as traffic heading south no longer needed to cross the fjord. Goalsevarre was moved from Lyngen to Ullsfjorden, and Haperokken could be retired. It was sold in 1978. Haalogaland was kept as a reserve.

For a while there were discussions of closing the service across Lyngen, but due to the significant time saving it allowed for cars to Tromsø, they were eventually retained. Although the time saving is not nesessarilly huge, the ferries cut down the driving distance by about 100 kilometers (62 mi).

=== Third generation ===
Mikal H. Bjørklid died in 1981, 60 years old. His ownership in the company passed to his wife Lisen Giæver Bjørklid, and his son Kjell Mikal Bjørklid took over as managing director, and remained in charge of the company for the rest of its history. The Pollfjellet Tunnel opened in 1983, terminating the need for the Lyngseidet–Furuflaten service.

The company was reorganized as a limited company in 1991. By then Haalogaland was insufficient for the operation, and reserve ferries had to be borrowed for the summer peak. Haalogaland was last used in revenue sercie in 1989, and was ultimately sold in 1992.

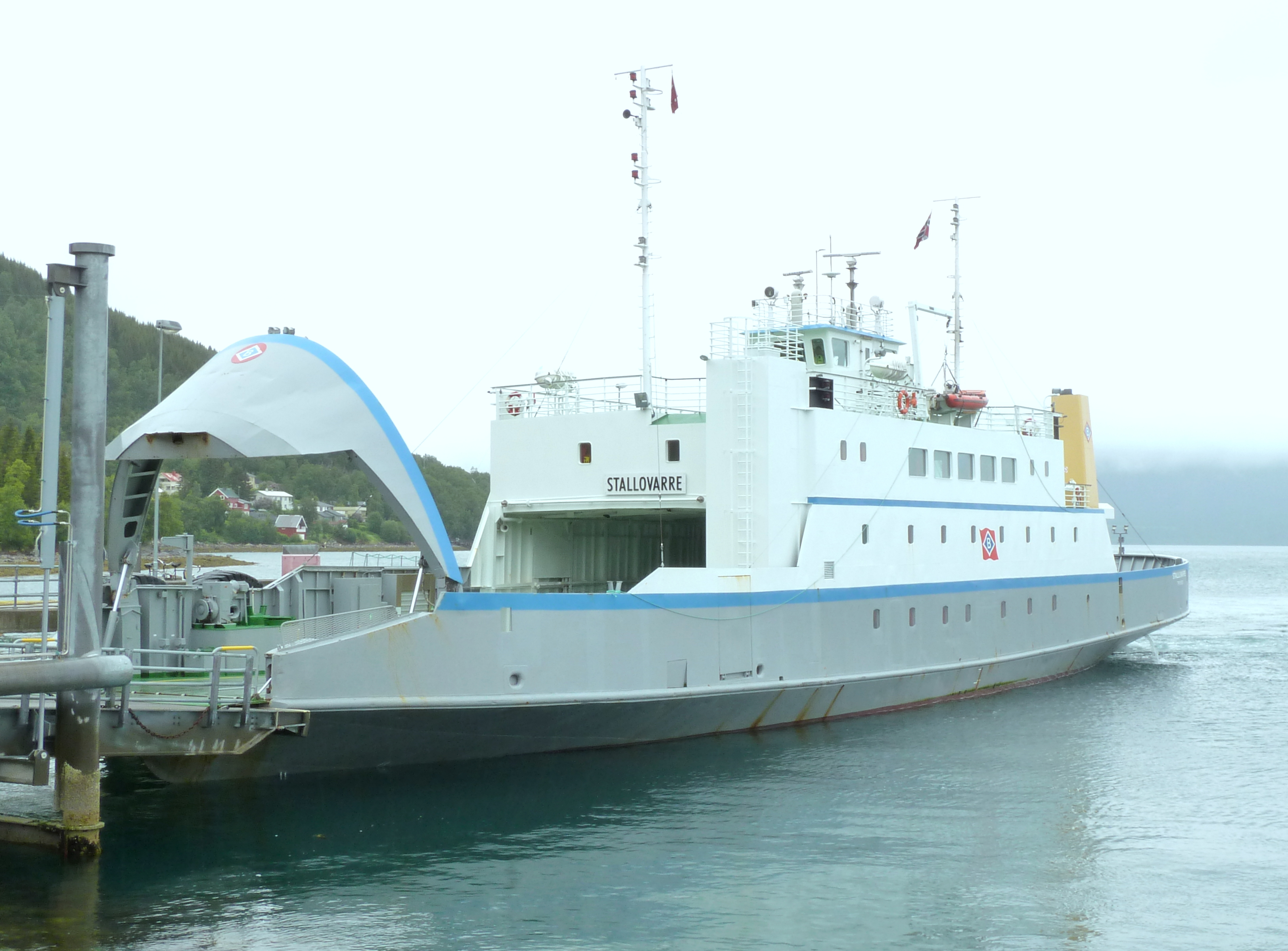
MF Stallovarre at Lyngseidet in 2010

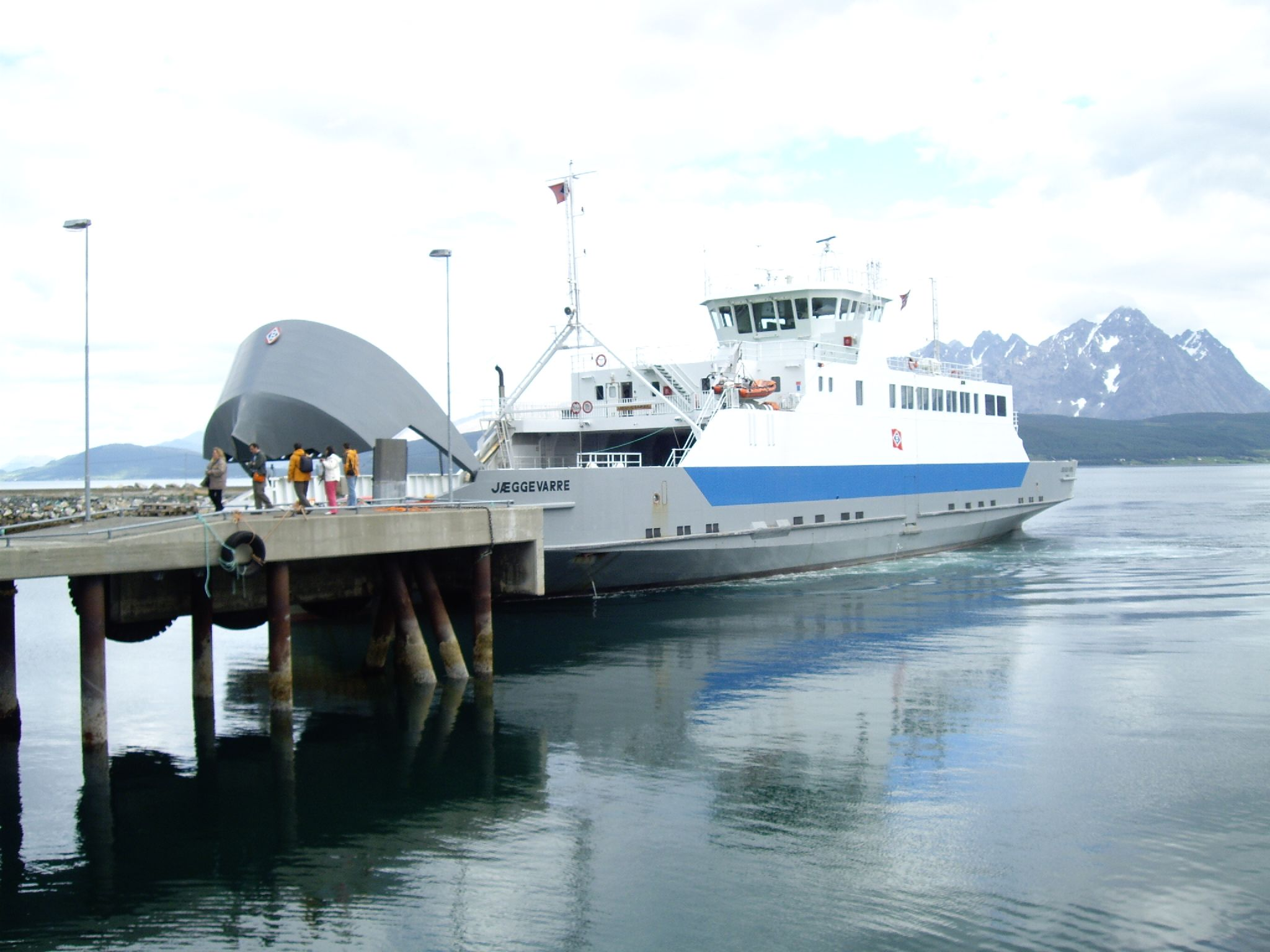
MF Jæggevarre at Breivikseidet in 2007

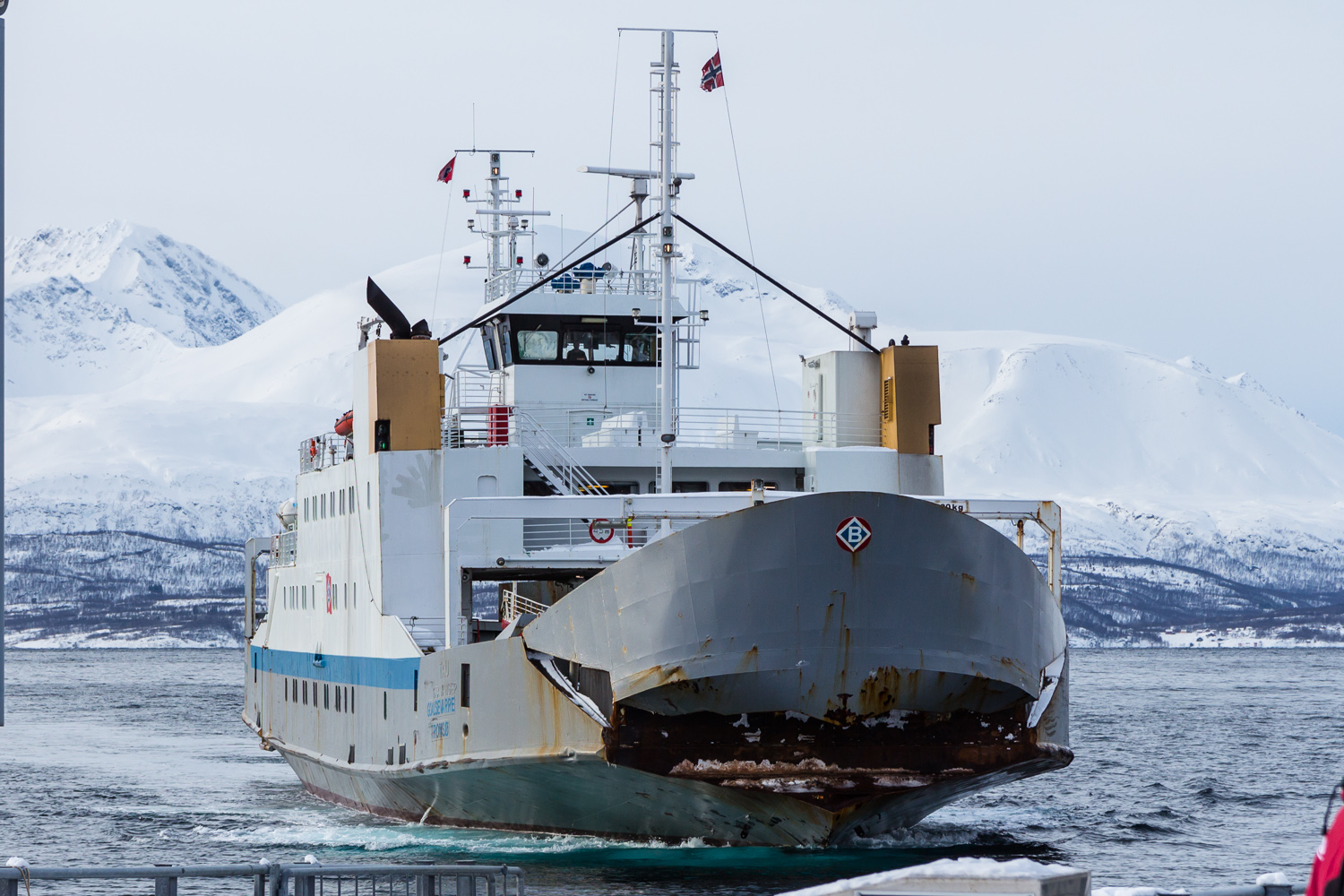
MF Gaolsavarre at Olderdalen in 2013

This capacity issue was resolved in March 1993, when the company bought MF Vaggasvarre used and put into the Ullsfjorden service. This was made possible after the quays at Breivikseidet and Svendsby had been upgraded. Goalsevarre was then moved to Lyngen, while Jæggevarre was made a reserve ferry.

By the turn of the milliennium the fleet was again in need of modernization. The first step was the purchase of a used ferry, renamed MF Stallovarre, built in 1978. She was put onto the Lyngseidet–Oldereide route. The ferry was upgdraded in 2004 with a new engine, allowing for faster crossing times.

In Ullsfjorden, both ferry quays were upgraded in 2001, allowing Bjerklid to introduce MF Jæggevarre, a new ferry on that service. This allowed Goalsevarre to be retired, while Vaggasvarre was retained as a reserve ferry. Jæggesvarre continued to operate as the main ferry on Ullsfjorden for the remained of the company's life.

=== PSO contracts and closure ===
The two routes operated by Bjørkli were made subject to public service obligations starting 1 January 2012, with the contract lasting until the end of 2020. The bid was won by Norled, but they made an agreement to let Bjørkli operate the service as a supplier. This required a new ferry for the Lyngen route, and Bjørkli bought MF Goalsevarre for this purpose.

For the new PSO contract, which ran from 2021 through 2030, Troms County Municipality required that the service be provided with hybrid-electric ferries. The contract stipulated that the operator had to make the necessary land-side investments in charging infrastructure. Bjørklids determined that this both involved technical expertise and risk which they were not fit to handle, and therefore chose not to bid. The contract for the package which included both of Bjørklids' traditional routes was won by Norled. Bjørklids ran their last service on 31 December 2020. With no route to operate, operations in the company ceased. The ferries were sold to Torghatten.

Bjørkeli was the last of the small, independent car ferry operators in Norway. While there in the early 1980s were about thirty ferry operators, many small with only one or a few routes, the industry since underwent a massive consolidation. The larger companies bought up the smaller ones, or they were dissolved once they had lost their PSO contract.

== Fleet ==
The following is a list of the ferries operated by Bjørkli Ferjerederi. It denotes the vessel, the car capacity (PCE), the year the ferry entered service with Bjørkeli and the year its service ended.

The ferries were named for the most part mountains in the area.

Vessel	PCE	Start	End	Notes
Lyngen–Riksvei 50; Hamperokken	20	1949	1992	Renamed in 1960
Jæggevarre (I)	30	1960	2002	
Haalogaland	5	1963	1992	Leased from 1963, bought in 1967
Bjorelvnes	4	1966	1976	
Goalsevarre (I)	32	1972	2003	
Vaggasvarre	32	1993	2020	Reserve from 2002
Stallovarre	32	2000	2020	From 2011 reserve/chartered out
Jæggevarre (II)	75	2002	2020	
Goalsevarre (II)	90	2011	2020	
