= Canute Caliste =

Grenadian painter (1914–2005)

Canute Caliste (April 16, 1914 – November 20, 2005) was a naive painter from Grenada.

Born Emmanuel Caliste on 16 April 1914 in L'Esterre, Carriacou. Caliste was also known as Mr Caliste, "Papa C.C." he was also a fisherman, sea cook, boat builder and master Quadrille violin player. Caliste began painting as a child, painting onto boards and any surfaces he could find.

Caliste was known as something of an eccentric. He claimed to have been inspired by a vision of a mermaid at the age of nine, and to have begun painting soon after. Caliste's work can now be found in numerous large collections worldwide. He is buried in the Joseph cemetery in L'Esterre.

== Gallery ==
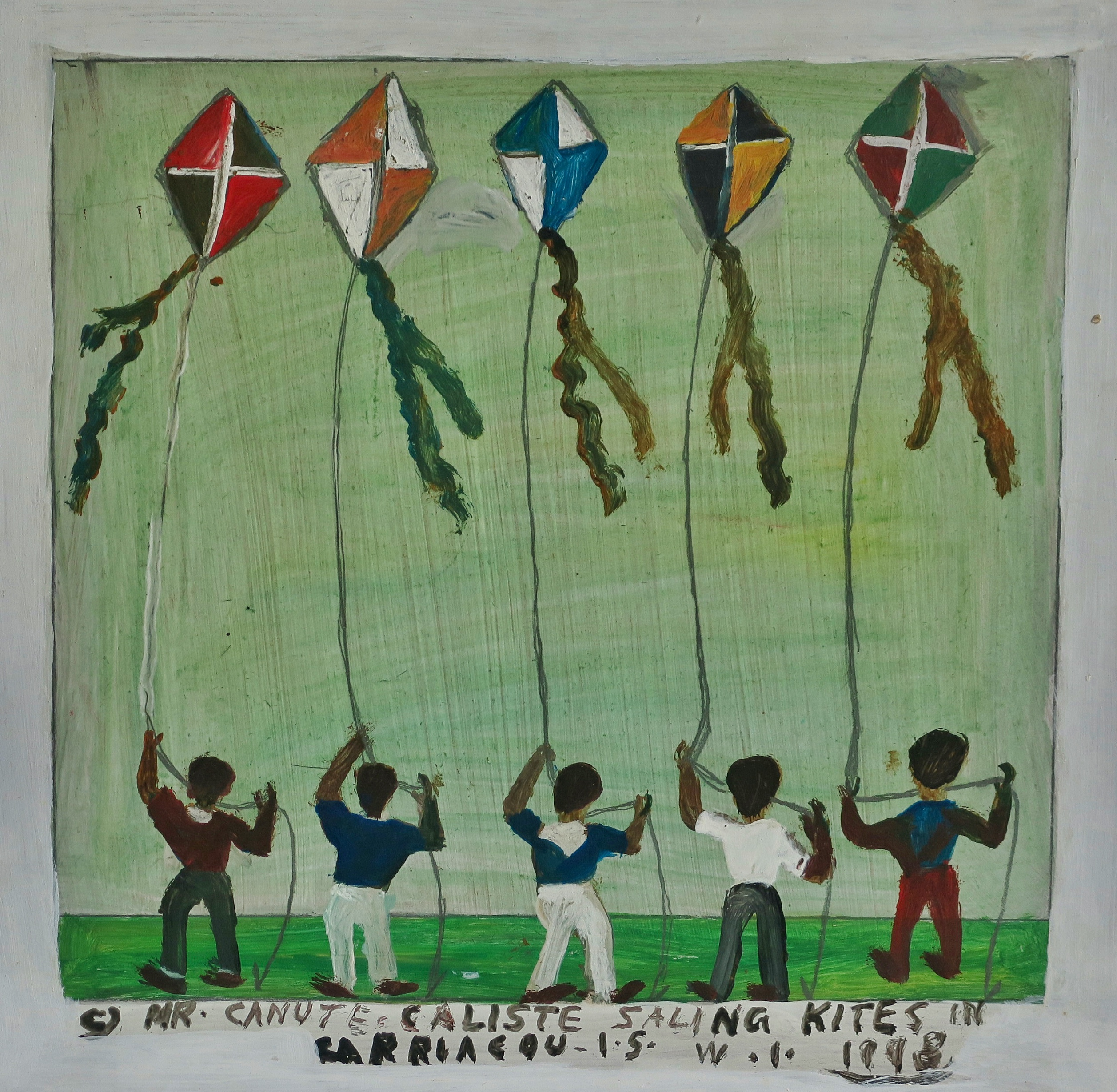
Painting of people with kites

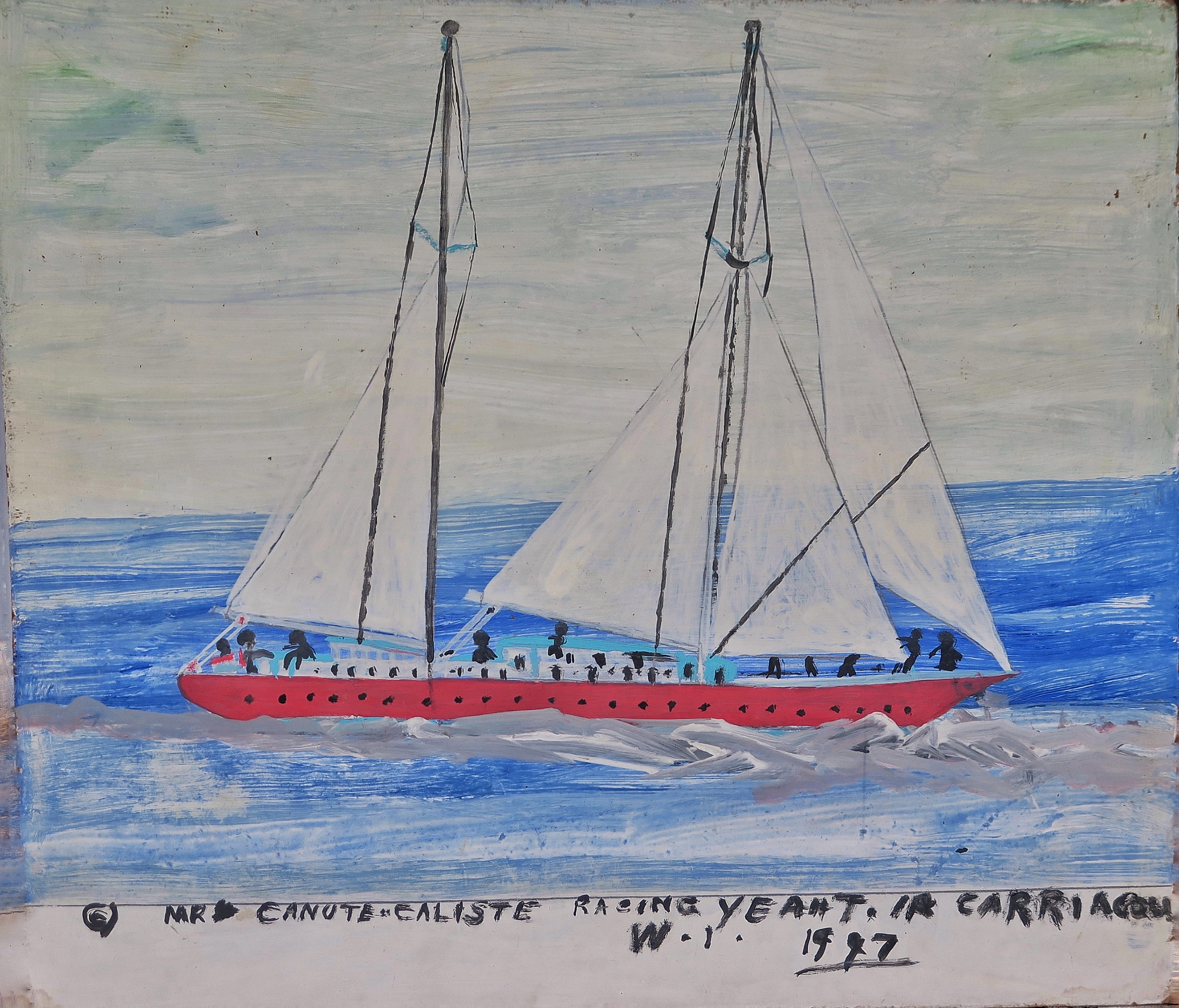
Painting of sail boat

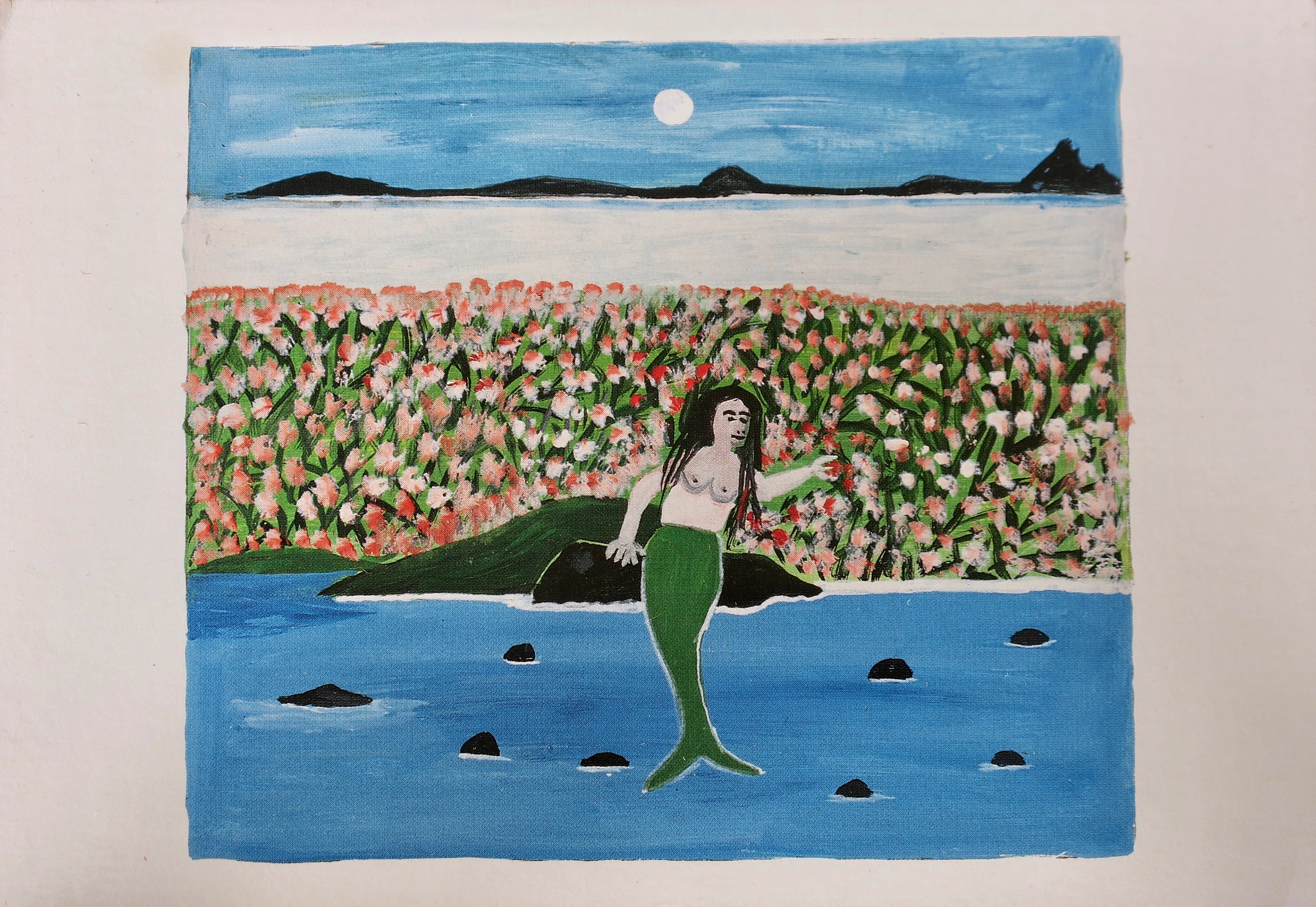
Painting of mermaid

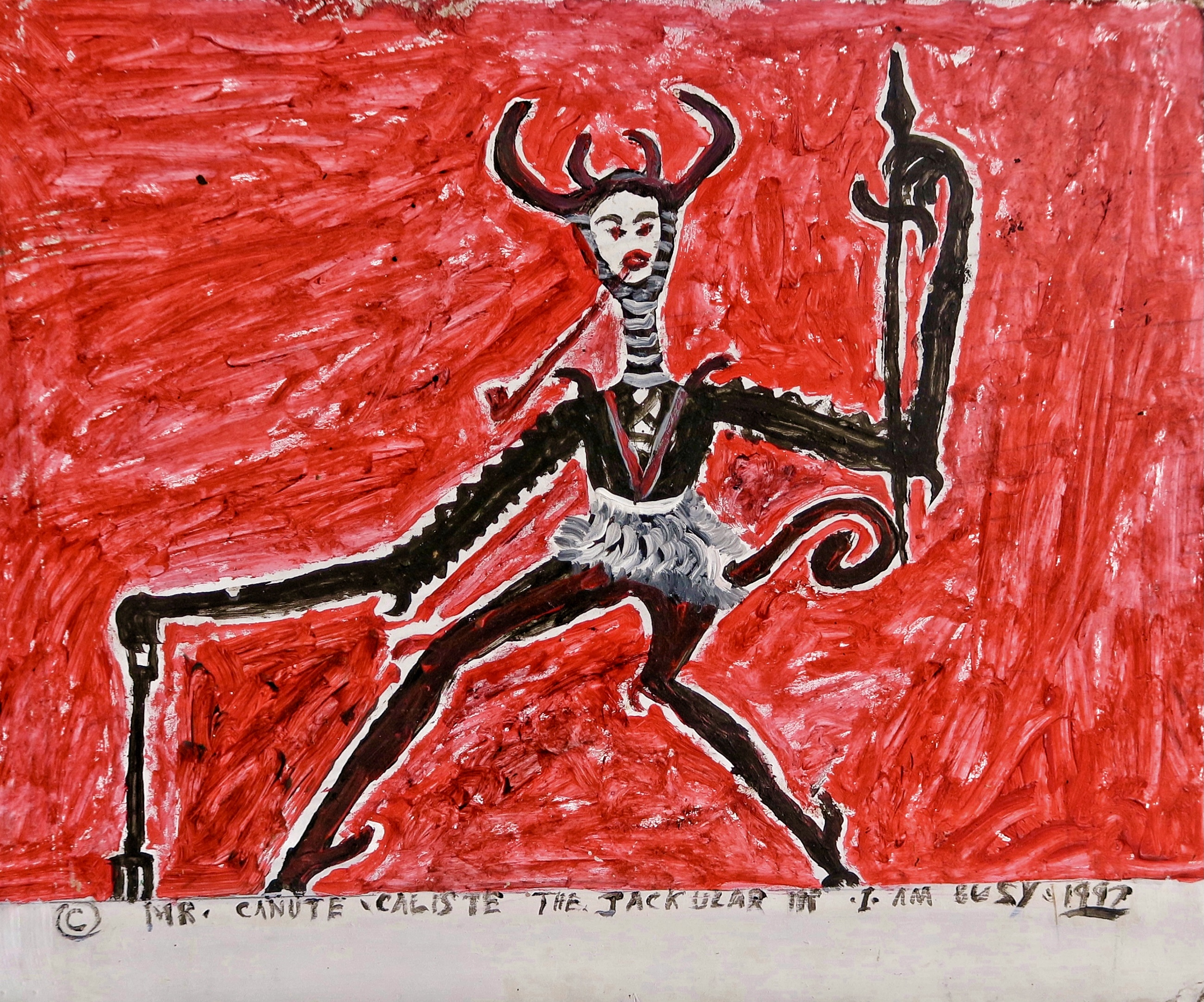
Painting of the Jackular

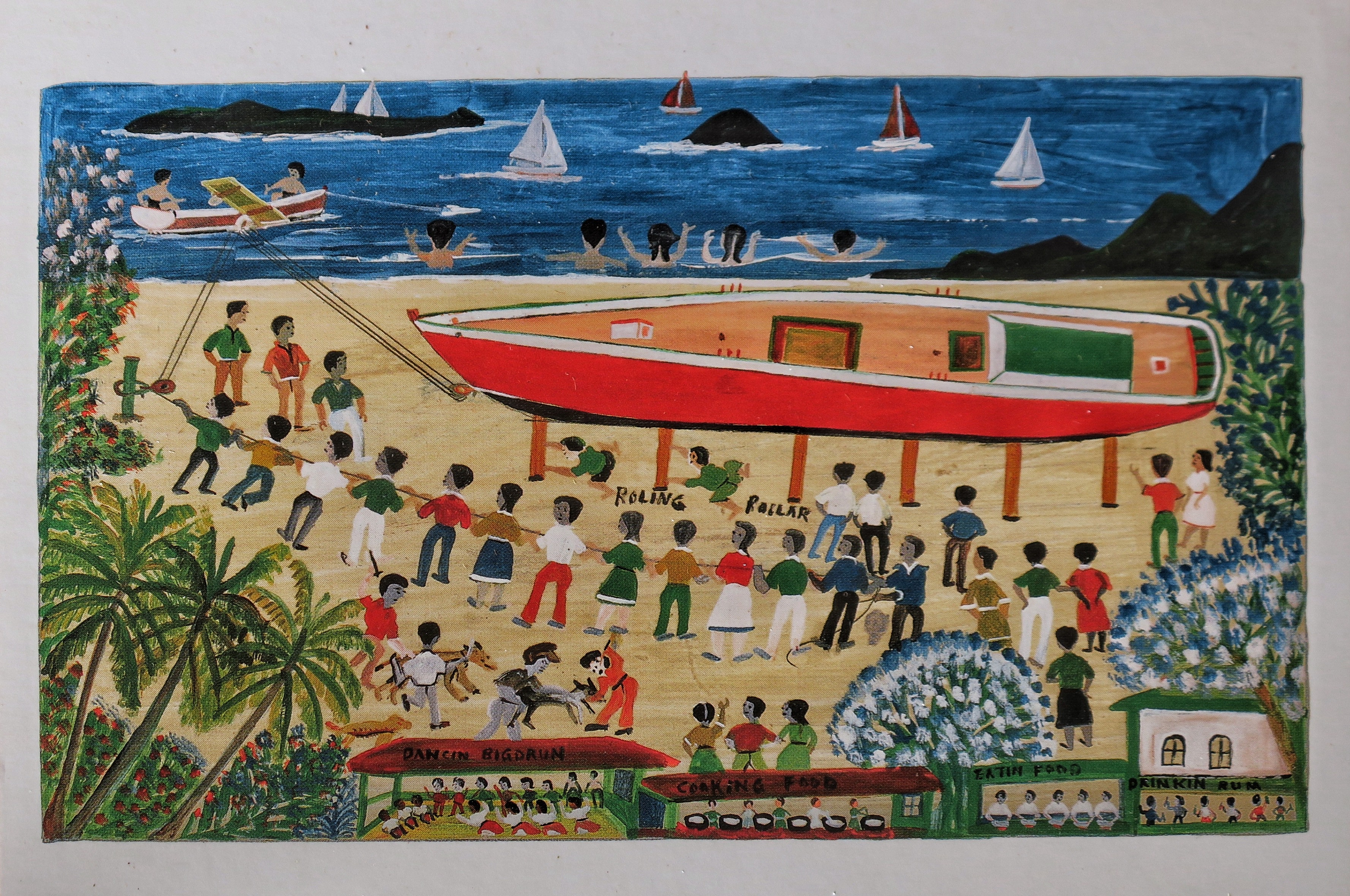
Painting of boat launch

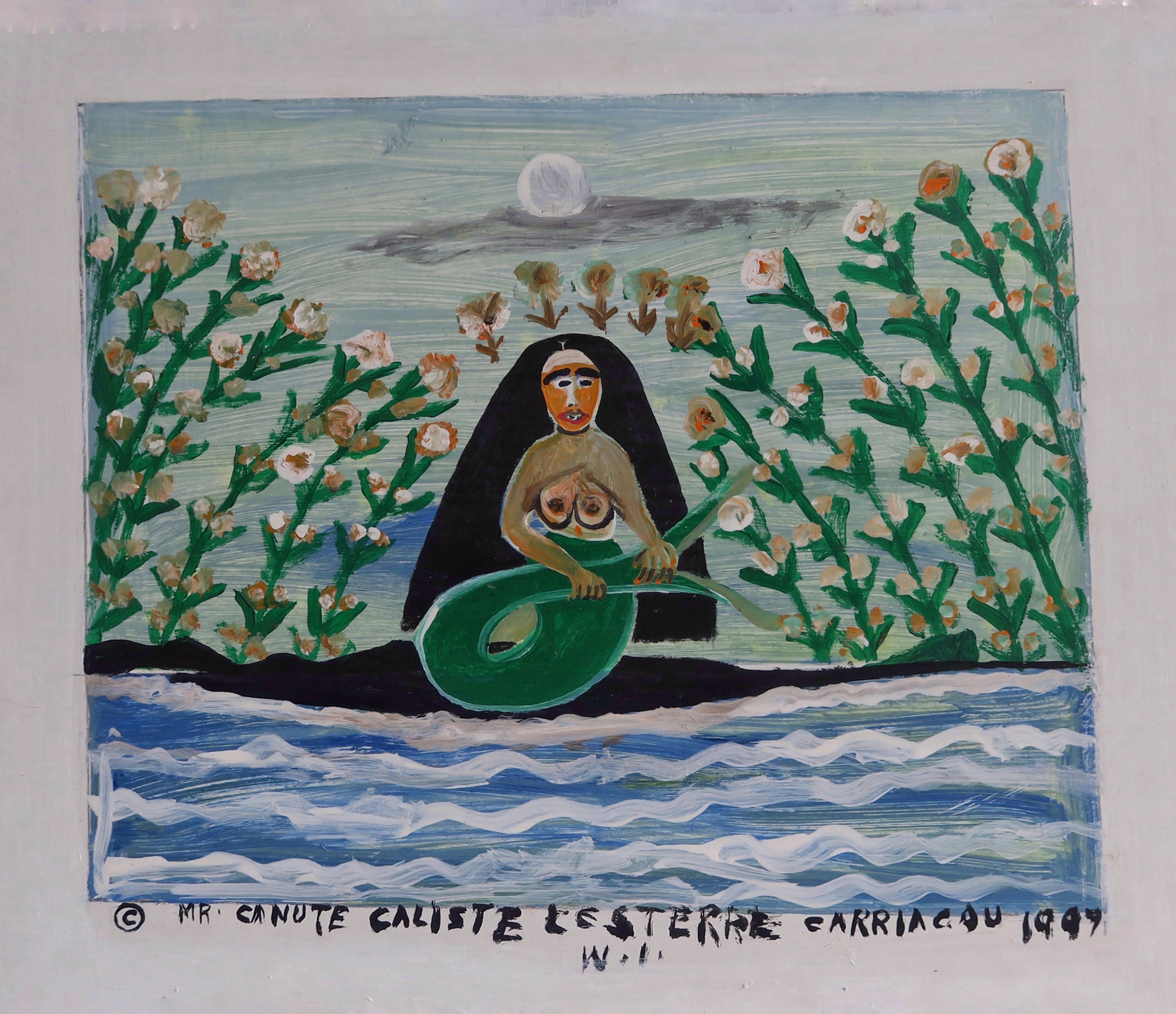
Painting of mermaid
