= Malvina Wells =

- Born: 1804; Carriacou, Grenada
- Died: 1887 (aged 82–83); Edinburgh, Scotland
- Known for: Only known burial in Edinburgh of someone born enslaved

Malvina Wells (1804 – 22 April 1887) was the only known person buried in Edinburgh who was born a slave.

== Birth and early life ==
Malvina Wells was born in 1804 in Carriacou, Grenada, in the West Indies. Her father was John Wells, a planter, and her mother's name is unknown.

In the 1817, slave register for Grand Bay estate in Carriacou, there is an entry which states 'in lawful possession of George G. Browne Mill and John Mill... mulatto, no distinguishing marks'. This entry showed Malvina Wells was aged 13; mulatto signified her father was white, and her mother was black.

== Life in Scotland ==
It is unknown when Malvina Wells was brought to Scotland. She worked for Joanna Isabella Macrae née Maclean, daughter of John McLean, who owned slaves in Carriacou.

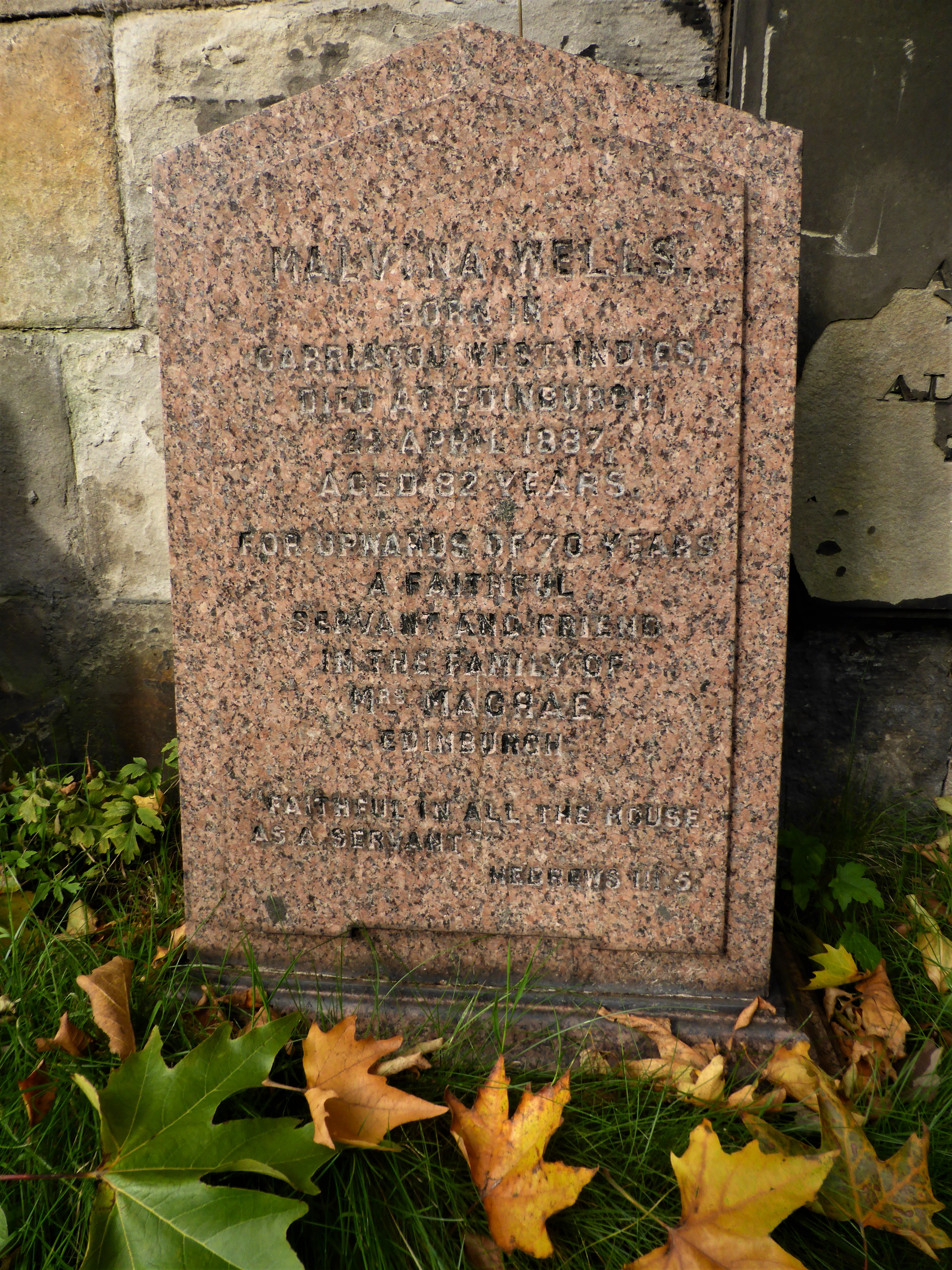
Gravestone of Malvina Wells in St John's Kirkyard, Edinburgh

In 1851, Malvina Wells was living at 33 Great King Street, Edinburgh, and was listed as a lady's maid, in the house of John A Macrae, Writer to the Signet, and his wife Joanna Macrae. By 1861, Malvina Wells lived at 42 Thistle Street, Edinburgh, as head of household, with a boarder named Mary Johnston, dressmaker. Ten years later in 1871, she lived at 2 Randolph Crescent, Edinburgh in the household of Edward Strathearn Gordon and wife Agnes Joanna Gordon, as a domestic servant.

In 1881, Malvina Wells is named in the census as Meleina Wells, living at 14 Gloucester Place, Edinburgh, aged 75 whilst still a lady's maid to Joanna Macrae, now a widow. Malvina died on 22 April 1887 aged 82, at 14 Gloucester Place. Her death was registered by Horatio R Macrae, son of Joanna Macrae, and cause of death was listed as heart disease.

== Memorial ==
Malvina Wells is buried under a marble headstone erected by the Macrae family in the graveyard of St Johns Church, Princes Street, Edinburgh. It lies to the right of a larger family memorial to Joanna Isabella Maclean, for whom she worked. The inscription records that she was a faithful friend and servant.
