= MF Maarfjeld =

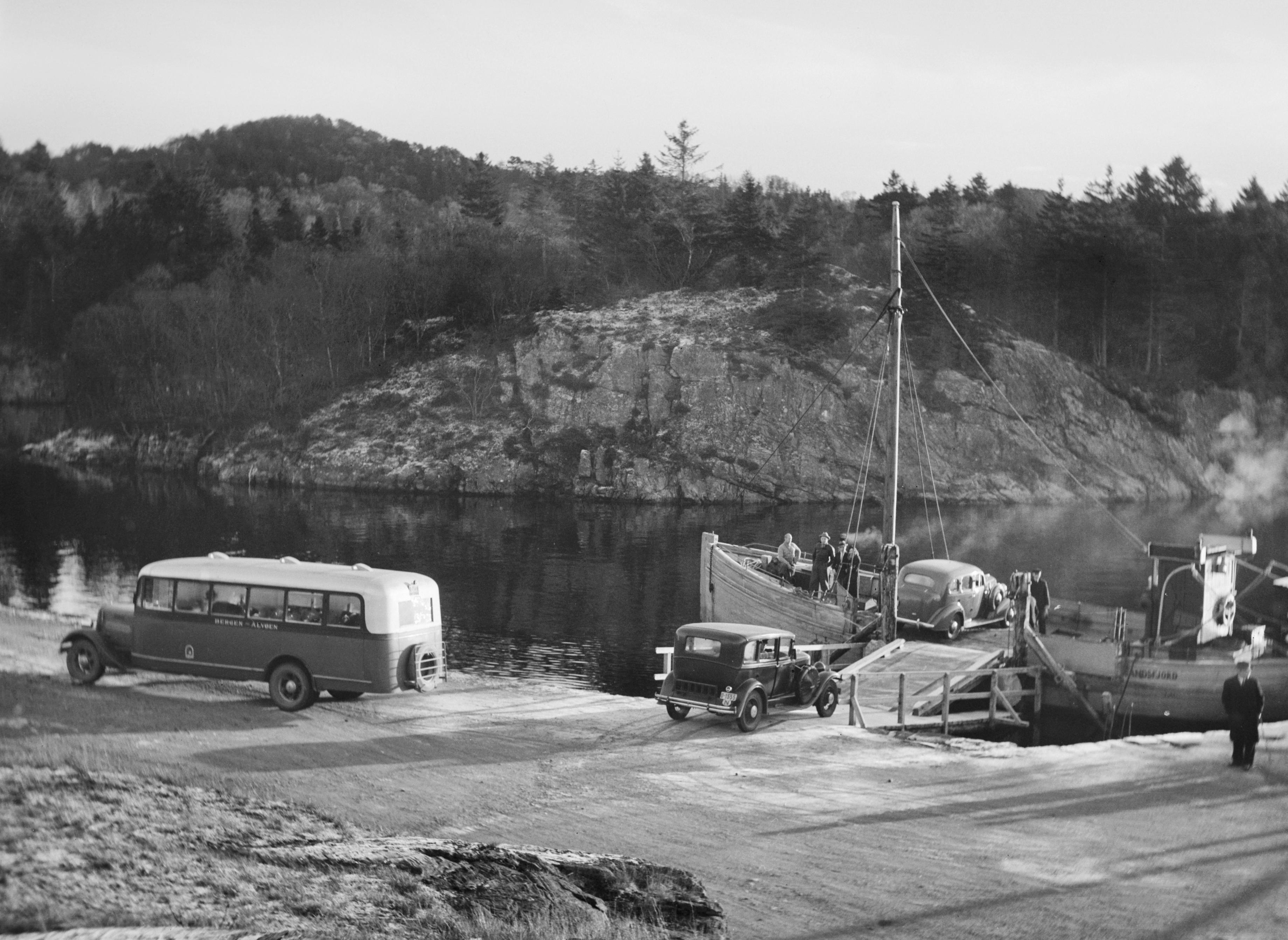
- Sandsfjord at Alvøen during the 1930s

History
- Name: Gyda (1905–30); MF Sandsfjord (1930–54); MF Bjorelvnes (1954–66); MF Maarfjeld (1966–76, 2002–09); MF Maarfjell (1976–2002)
- Namesake: Sandsfjord; Bjorelvnes; Mårfjellet
- Owner: Osmund Johannessen (1934–54); Gisund Ferje (1954–66); Bjørklids Ferjerederi (1966–1976); Draugen Froskemannsklubb (1976–93)
- Operator: Osmund Johannessen (1934–54); Gisund Ferje (1954–66); Bjørklids Ferjerederi (1966–1976); Troms Fylkes Dampskibsselskap (1974–76); Draugen Froskemannsklubb (1976–93)
- Port of registry: Bømlo (1905–17); Stavanger (1917–34); Bergen (1934–54); Tromsø (1954–76); Trondheim (1976–93)
- Route: Brattholmen–Alvøen; Gibostad–Bjorelvnes; Mefjordvær–Senjahopen
- Builder: Båtbyggeri Lars Djuve
- Completed: 1905
- Identification: Call sign: LHVW (1905–33), LHEU (1933–2009)
- Fate: Burned on 26 April 2009 in Tysnes, subsequently sank on 27 April 2009

General characteristics
- Type: Ferry
- Tonnage: 34 GRT / 24 NRT
- Length: 19.69 m (64.6 ft)
- Beam: 6.33 m (20.8 ft)
- Draught: 2.22 m (7 ft 3 in)
- Propulsion: Union diesel engine; Scania-Vabis diesel
- Speed: 7 kn (13 km/h; 8 mph)
- Capacity: 3–5 cars; 36 passengers

MF Maarfjeld was a wooden vessel variously used as a cargo hauler, ferry and diving boat. Built by Båtbyggeri Lars Djuve in Åkrafjorden in 1905 as Gyda, she was initially a sailship used to haul cargo around Bømlo and later Ryfylke in Norway. She was renamed Sandsfjord in 1930, and rebuilt as a motor vessel and a ferry in 1934.

As a ferry she initially served on the Brattholmen–Alvøen route between Bergen and Sotra. She was sold in 1956 to Gisund Ferje, who named her MF Bjorelvnes and put her on the Gibostad–Bjorelvnes crossing of Gisundet, connecting the island of Senja to the mainland. She was sold to Bjørklids Ferjerederi in 1966, who used her on school routes in Lyngen and then connecting Jøvik in Ullsfjorden. There she was renamed Maarfjeld. From 1974 to 1976, she was leased to Troms Fylkes Dampskibsselskap, who used her between Mefjordvær and Senjahopen on Senja-

The ship was sold for use as a diving vessel in 1974. She was then rebuilt and used as a work boat from 1993, until being sold to a private individual in 2002. She caught on fire on 26 April 2009, burned out and subsequently sank in Tysnes the following day.

== Specifications ==
As configured as a ferry, the vessel had an overall length of 19.69 meters (64.6 ft), a beam of 6.33 meters (20.8 ft) and a draught of 2.22 meters (7 ft 3 in). This gave her her a register tonnage of 34 gross and 24 net. She has a capacity for 3–5 passenger car equivalents and 36 passengers. She was equipped with a Union two-stroke diesel engine, later replaced with a Scania-Vabis. These allowed her to cruise at 7 knots (13 km/h; 8.1 mph).

== History ==
=== Service as sailship ===
The vessel was originally built as a wooden, cargo-hauling sailing ship at Båtbyggeri Lars Djuve. She was ordered by Lars Lodden of Bømlo and built at Åkrafjorden in 1905. Given the name Gyda, she was used for as a cargo vessel. Ownership passed to Svein Tengsdal of Sand in 1931, who renamed her Sandsfjord and moved her home port to Stavanger. Ownership passed shortly afterwards to Nils H. Eide, also of Sand.

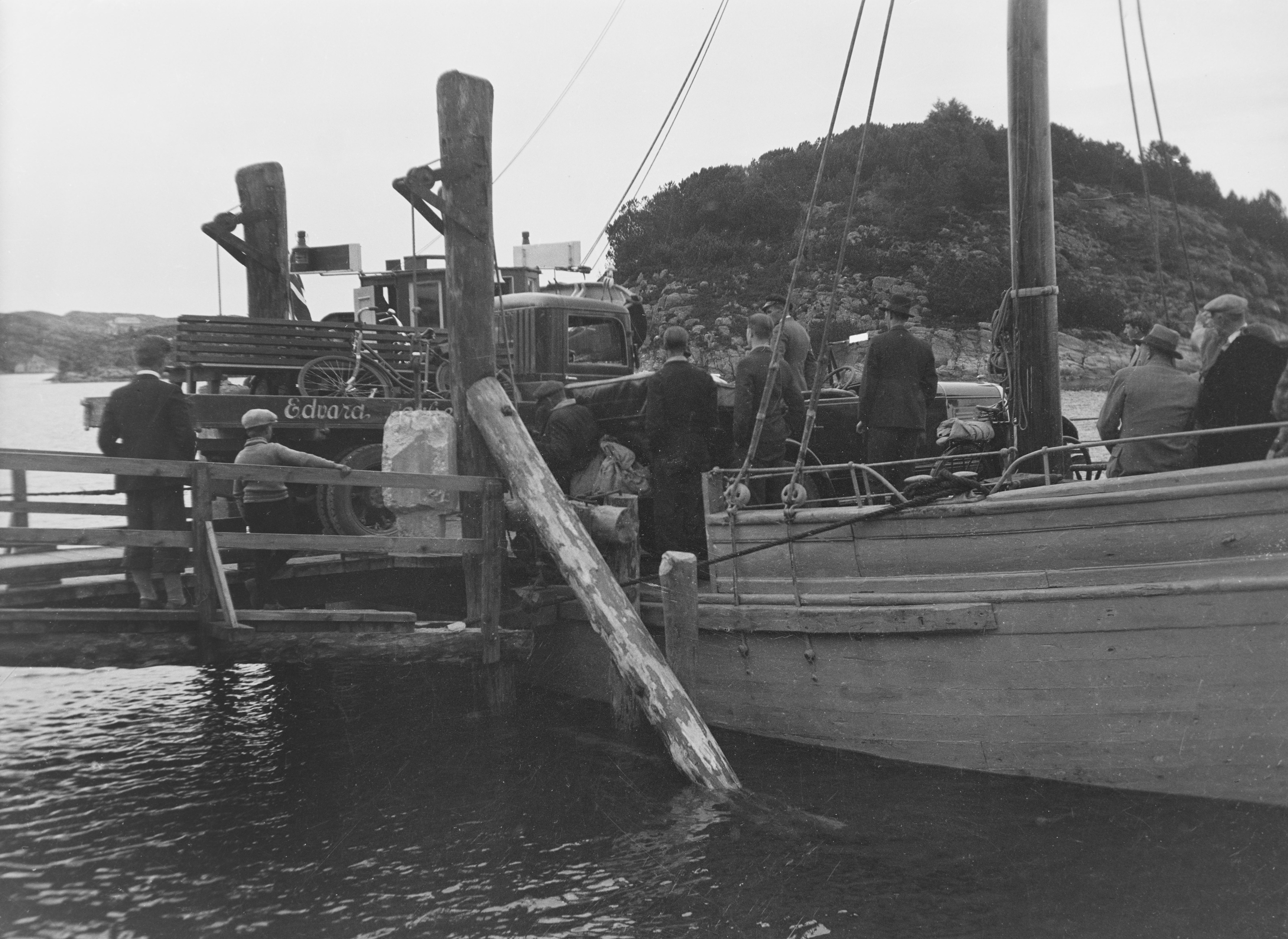
Loading a vehicle at Alvøen in the late 1930s

=== Service with Johannessen ===
At the time there was discussion of establishing a permanent road ferry service between Brattholmen and Alvøen. This would allow the archipelago of Sotra a road connection to Bergen. The dominant coastal shipping company around Sotra, Rutelaget Bergen–Vest, turned down an offer to operate a ferry route to Sotra, as they thought the archipelago's poor road standard would make taking car trips there uninteresting. Local shipowner Osmund Johannessen offered to provide this service if guaranteed a certain revenue by the Public Roads Administration. The latter also invested in new quays at Brattholmen and Alvøen.

Johannessen bought Sandsfjord and retained her name. She was converted to a motor vessel, with a Union diesel engine built in Bergen.

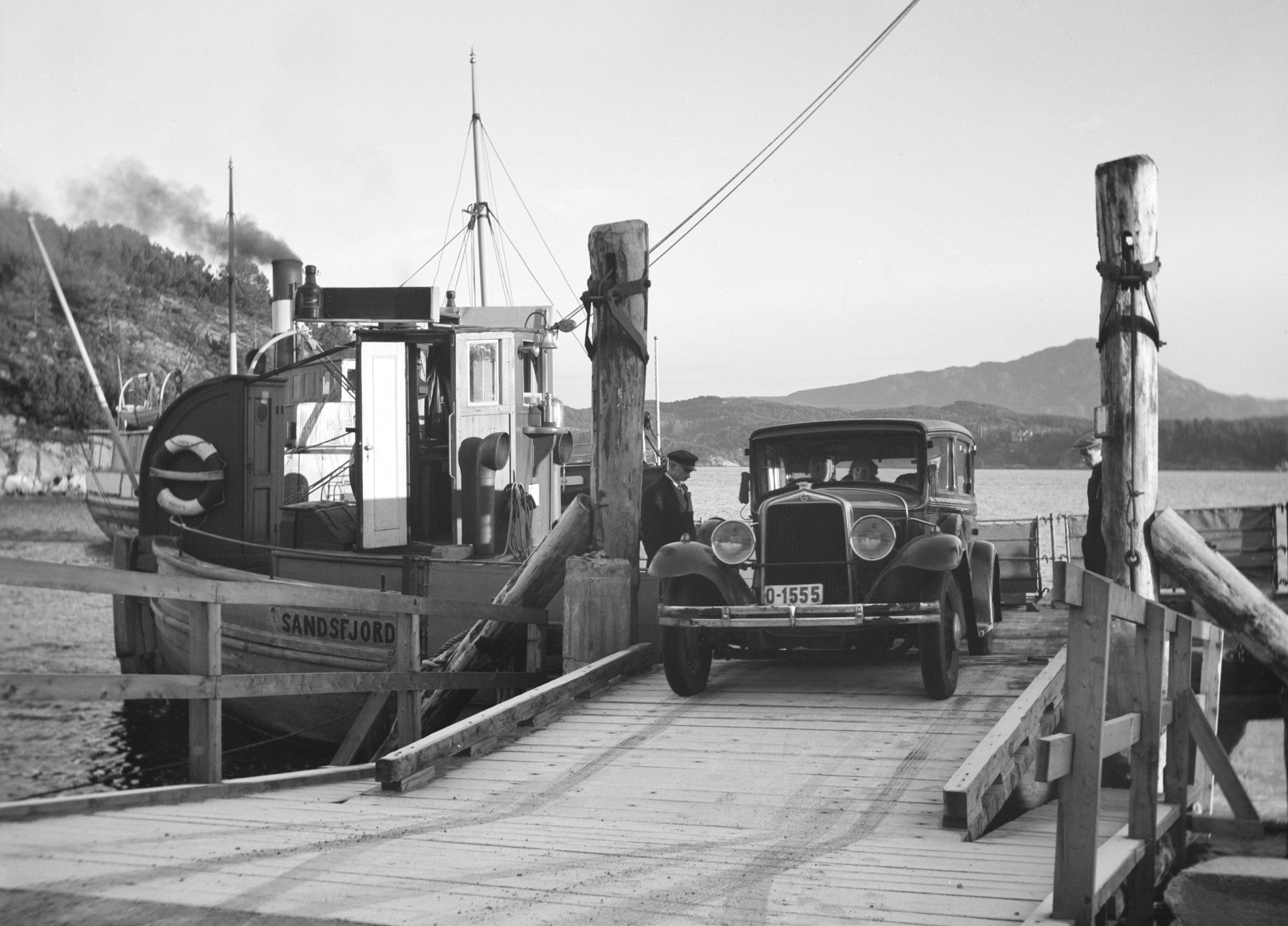
Sandsfjord at Alvøen

Services began on 14 May 1935. Shortly afterwards the company A/S Bilferjetrafikk was founded with the intent of operating the ferry route and manage the public subsidies. They took over the route on 1 October 1937, but subcontracted the operations of Johannessen. By 1938 the route had seven daily crossings and was carrying an average six cars per day. Up until then, cars had to drive onto the ship from the side. She was rebuilt in 1939, moving the port to the bow.

Sandsfjord was damaged in September 1942, and had to be taken out of service for repairs until 19 October. At the end of the war, in 1946, the service was reorganized. The government contract was transferred to Bergen–Vest, although they continued to subcontract operations of Johannessen. Sandsfjord remained on the service until 1951, when she was replaced by the larger MF Vatna.

=== Service with Gisund Ferje ===
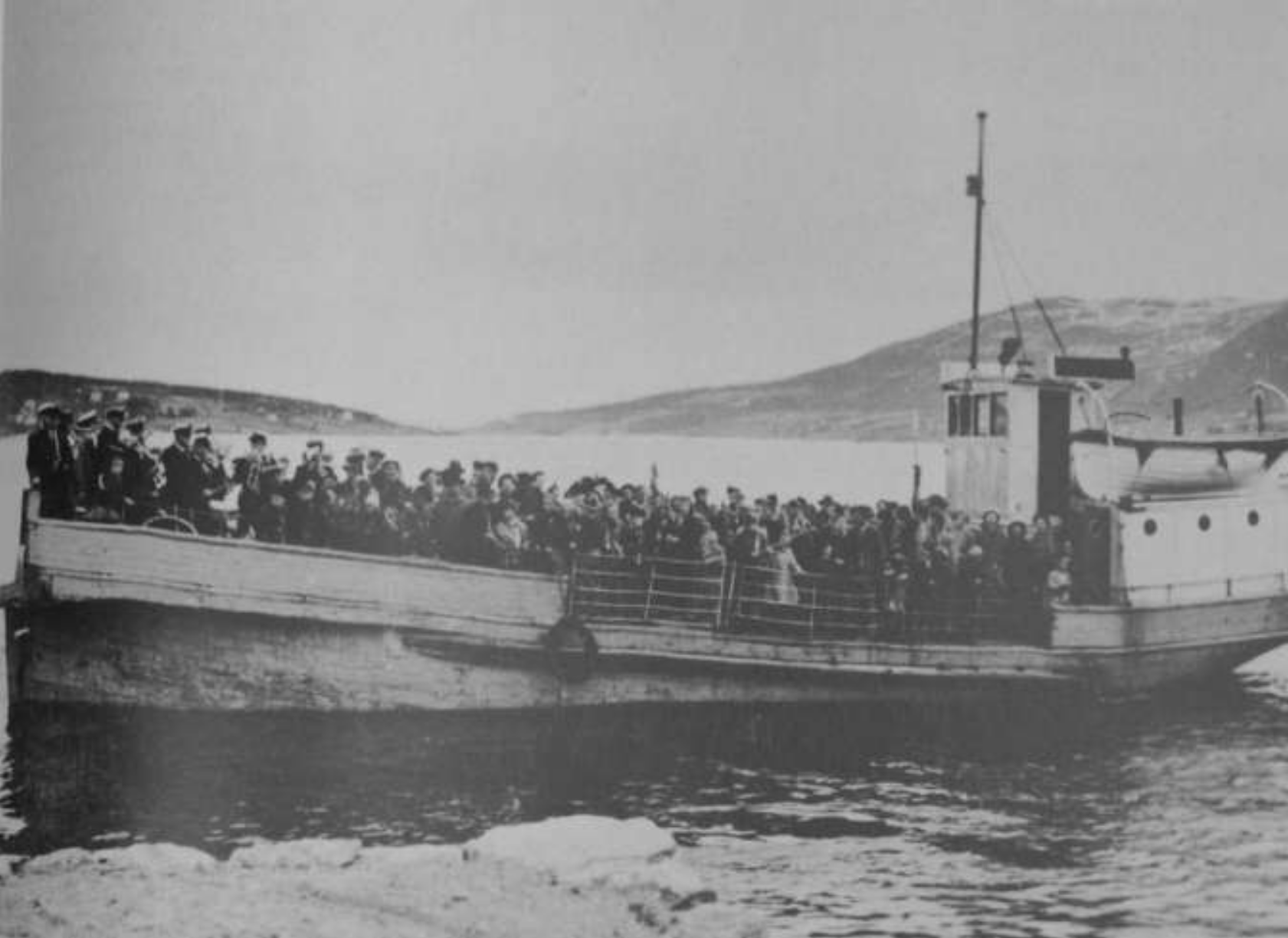
Bjorelvnes carrying people across Gisundet in conjunction with Constitution Day on 17 May 1960.

The vessel was sold to the cooperative Gisund Ferje A/L, which had been incorporated on 7 May 1952 to establish a car ferry service between Gibostad on the island of Senja and Bjorelvnes on the mainland, crossing Gisundet. The ferry was renamed MF Bjorelvnes and her home port moved to Tromsø. Services on the crossing started on 1 August 1953. It was initially only used for passengers, until the quays on each side had been rebuilt to allow for car traffic. Bjorelvnes remained in service across Gisund until 1964, when she was replaced by the larger MF Rødstein in 1964. She was kept as a reserve for two years, before being sold.

=== Service with Bjørklids Ferjerederi ===
The vessel was bought by Bjørklids Ferjerederi in 1966 and slightly rebuilt. Bjørklid renamed her Maarfjeld, after the mountain Mårfjellet, although she kept her registry in Tromsø. She was initially used as to transport school children, connecting Samuelsberg and Nordnes to Olderdalen, along Lyngen in Kåfjord Municipality. She was later used on Ullsfjorden to connect the village of Jøvik to Svensby and Breivikeidet. The European Road E6 open along Lyngen in 1974, making several of the ferry services redundant, including the need for Maarfjeld.

Bjørklid therefor leased the ship to Troms Fylkes Dampskibsselskap (TFDS), who moved her back to Senja for use on the local service between Mefjordvær and Senjahopen.

=== Late career ===
TFDS returned Maarfjeld in 1976, and she was sold to the Trondheim-based diving club Draugen Froskemannsklubb. They rebuilt her slightly and used her as a diving vessel. She was subsequently sold to Bergen Fergestransport in 1993, where she was used for transport. While there her spelling was somewhat modernized to Maarfjell. She was ultimately sold to a private individual in 2002, who started work on renovating her. Her name reverted back to Maarfjeld.

By 2009 she had been moved to Flygandsværvågen on Tysnes, where she was stored while waiting for renovations. She caught on fire on 26 April. The fire quickly spread to land, where it started a forest fire. Maarfjeld was therefore towed away from land, where the fire quenching continued, including assistance from the Coast Guard. By the time the fire was out, the ship was a wreck. She sank the following day.

== Bibliography ==
- Rauø, Kåre (1992). Det var en gang ... fotografier fra Lenvik (PDF) (in Norwegian). Vol. IV. Lenvik: Lenvik Bygdemuseum. ISBN 82-90669-12-7.
- Virkesdal, Erling (1988). Fra dampbåt til leddbuss: Rutelaget Bergen–Vest A/S 1898–1988 (in Norwegian). Bergen: Rutelaget Bergen–Vest. ISBN 8271281275.
