= Tyrell Bay =

Bay in Grenada

Coordinates: 12.458°N 61.487°W

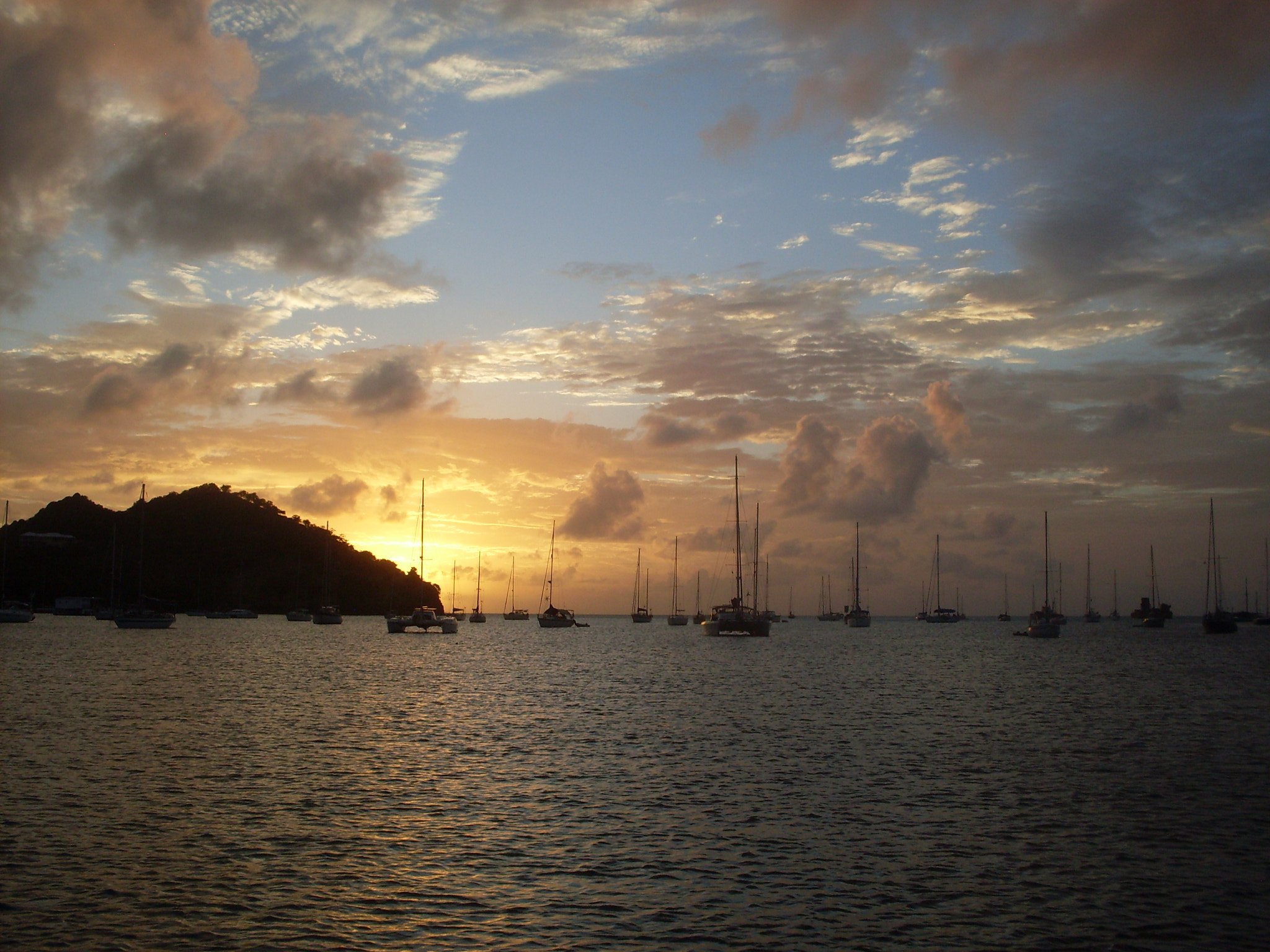
Yachts in the sunset

Tyrell Bay, sometimes spelled Tyrrel Bay, is a bay on the south-western part of the island of Carriacou in Grenada. It is the site of the island's only port, and thus the site where the ferry to St. George's and other islands docks.

The bay, with its various bars and restaurants, is a popular anchorage and used by yachts to shelter from hurricanes.

From 2018 to 2025, the port was home to MV Dolly C, which operated ferry services to St. George's, as well as Petite Martinique, Sandy Island and Clifton on Union Island in the Saint Vincent and the Grenadines.
