= MF Jæggevarre (1960) =

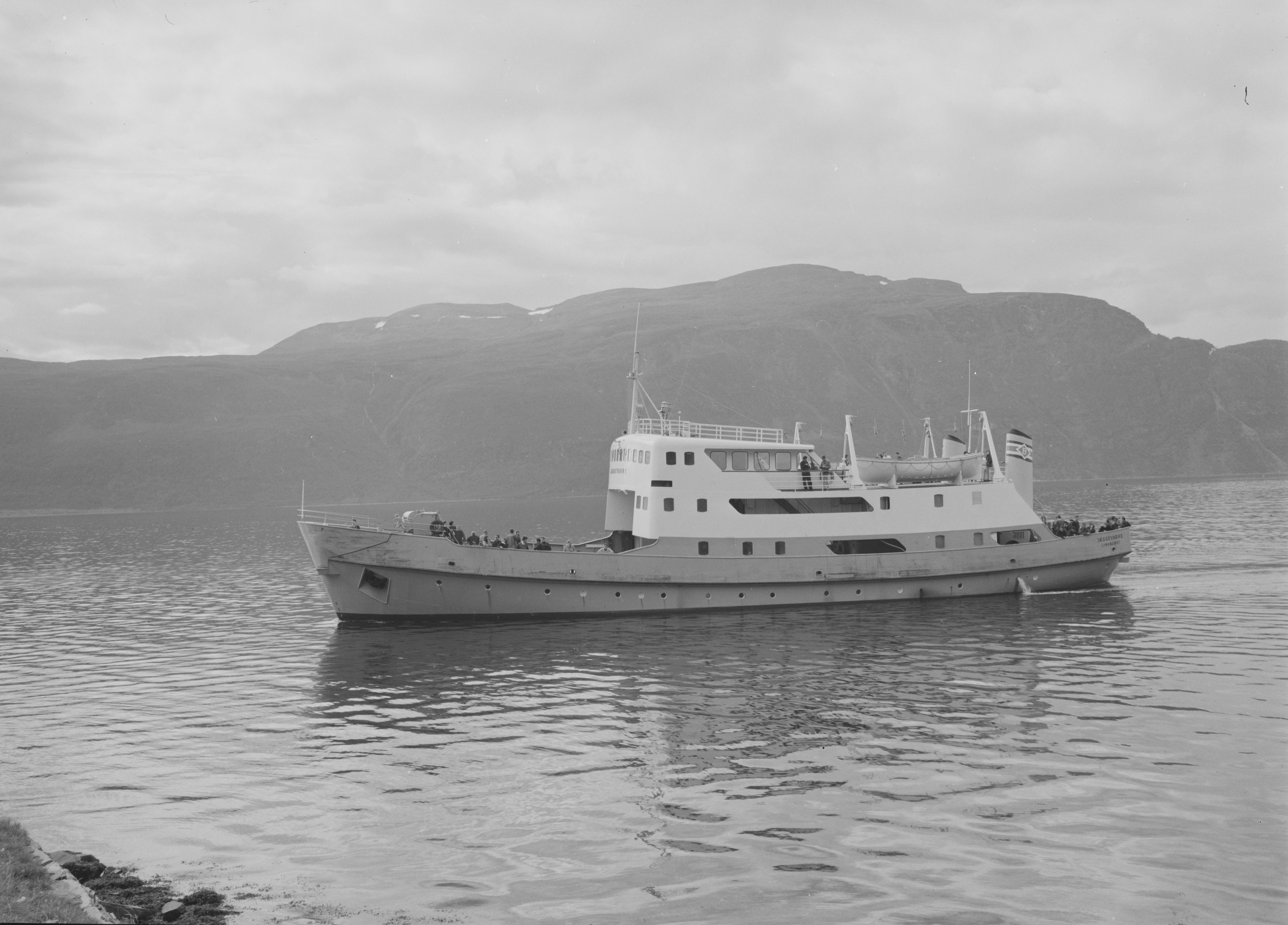
- MF Jæggevarre in 1963

History
- Name: MF Jæggevarre (1960–2002); MF Jæggevarre I (2002–05); MV Shissiwani 2 (2005–)
- Namesake: Jiehkkevárri
- Owner: Bjørklids Ferjerederi (1960–2005); Sourette Misbahou (2005–)
- Operator: Bjørklids Ferjerederi (1960–2005); Sourette Misbahou (2005–)
- Port of registry: Tromsø; Mutsamudu
- Route: Lyngseidet–Olderdalen
- Builder: Kaarbøs mekaniske Verksted
- Yard number: 29
- Completed: July 1960
- Identification: IMO number: 8879278; Call sign: LASU
- Fate: Abandoned after running aground near Vohemar, Madagascar, in May 2022.

General characteristics
- Type: Ferry
- Tonnage: 363 GRT / 116 NRT
- Length: 43.7 m (143 ft)
- Beam: 9.8 m (32 ft)
- Draught: 4.0 m (13.1 ft)
- Installed power: 184 kW (250 hp) (1949–64); 239 kW (325 hp) (1964–)
- Propulsion: Wichmann diesel engine
- Speed: 12 kn (22 km/h; 14 mph)
- Capacity: 30 cars; 200 passengers

MF Jæggevarre was a roll-on/roll-off passenger and road vehicle ferry built in 1963 by Kaarbøs mekaniske Verksted. She was delivered to Bjørklids Ferjerederi, who put her into service on the Lyngseidet–Olderdalen crossing of Lyngen in Troms, Norway. She remained the main ferry on this route until 1993, after which she was demoted as a reserve. She was renamed MF Jæggevarre I in 2002.

The ferry was sold to Sourette Misbahou, who named her MV Shissiwani 2 and sailed down to the Comoros in 2002. There she ran on ocean services from Anjouan to Tanzania and Madagascar. She was used as part of the 2008 invasion of Anjouan. A year later she caught on fire. After running out of diesel fuel, she ran aground near Vohemar, Madagascar, in May 2022 and was subsequently abandoned.

== Specifications ==
The vessel was a steel, single-direction, roll-on/roll-off passenger and road vehicle ferry. She has an overall length of 43.7 meters (143 ft), a beam of 9.8 meters (32 ft) and a draught of 4 meters (13 ft). This gave her a register tonnage of 363 gross and 116 net. She has a capacity for 30 passenger car equivalents and 200 passengers. She was equipped with a Wichmann seven-cylinder diesel engine with a power output of 674 kW (875 hp). This allowed her to cruise at 12 knots (22 km/h; 14 mph).

== History ==
=== Service in Norway ===
Jæggevarre was Bjørklid's second ferry. She was ordered after Bjørklid won the tender to operate the Breivikseidet–Svensby service across Ullsfjorden. Instead of buying a new ferry for the new route, he instead ordered a Jæggevarre as a larger ferry which was put into the primary Lyngseidet–Olderdalen service. She was at the time one of the largest car ferries in the country, and one of the very first to have a hydraulic bow port.

The vessel was built by Kaarbøs mekaniske Verksted in Harstad and delivered in July 1960. Lyngseidet–Olderdalen was at the time on National Road 50, which would later become E6, the main north–south highway through Norway. She was capable of handling traffic for most of the season, but there were huge traffic spikes in the summer, for which additional ferries were often chartered.

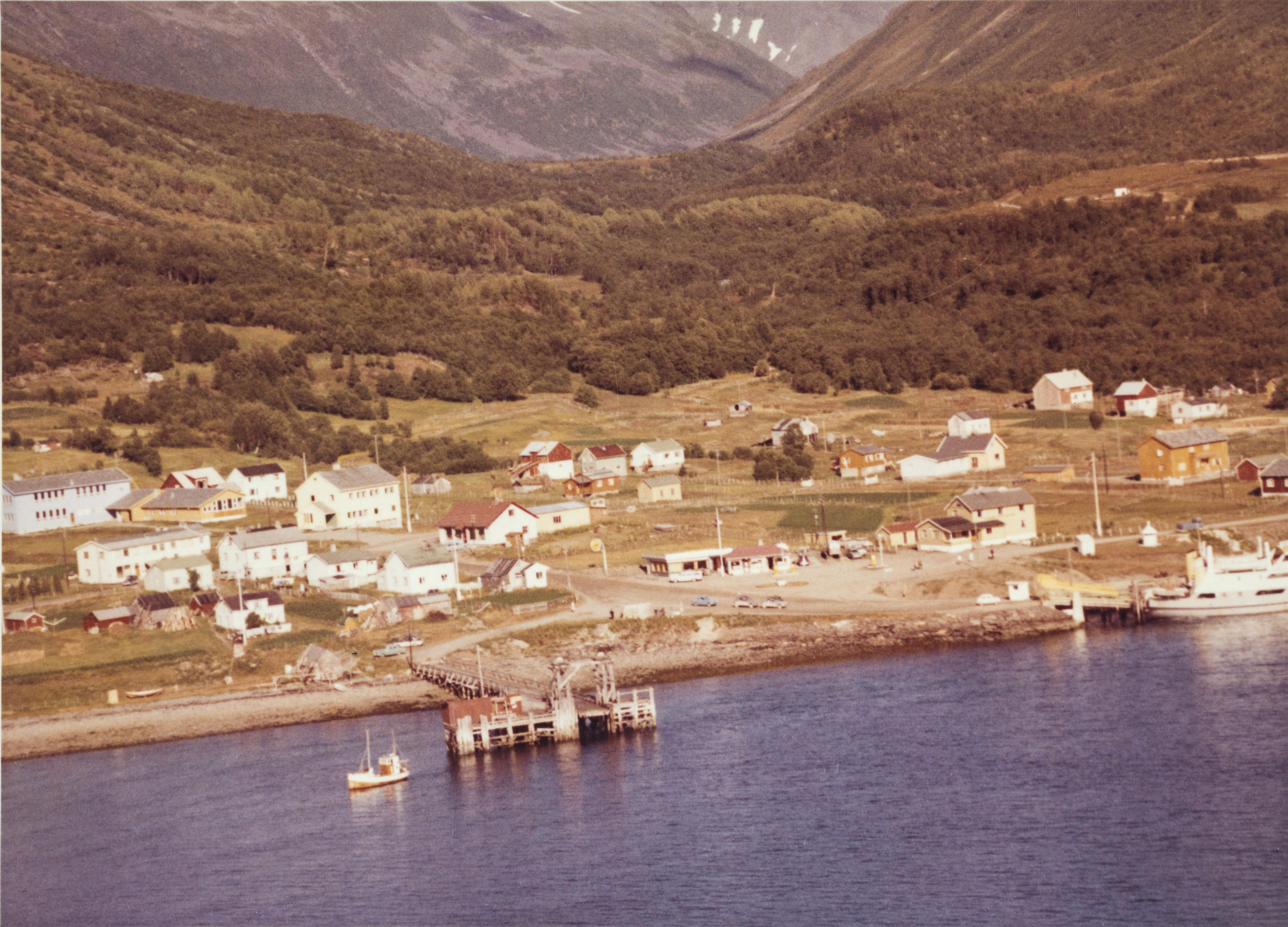
Olderdalen in 1963, with MF Jæggevarre docked at quay

Traffic increased dramatically in the late 1960s. At the worst, waiting times at Lyngseidet and Olderdalen were up to five hours. In 1972 Bjørklid took delivery of MF Goalsevarre, which would supplement Jæggevarre on the Lyngen crossing. The section of E6 along 40 percent the east shore of Lyngen opened in 1974, creating a fixed link for the E6 along Lyngen. Traffic fell overnight, as traffic heading south no longer needed to cross the fjord. Goalsevarre was transferred to Ullsfjorden, and Jæggevarre was once again the sole ferry crossing Lyngen. The permitted vehicle height was increased in the early 1980s through a raising of the poop deck. Jæggevarre continued as the main ferry on the Lyngseidet–Olderdalen route. From the 1990s, traffic on the route had reached levels she was not capable of, and other vessels had to be chartered as a second ferry.

New quays in Ullsfjorden in 1993 allowed for a MF Vaggasvarre to be delivered and serve there. That freed up Goalsevarre, which was moved to Lyngen. Jæggevarre was kept as a reserve, and was put into two-ferry operations during the peak traffic in summer.

Bjørklid took delivery a new ferry, named MF Jæggevarre, in 2002. To free up the name, the old ferry was renamed MF Jæggevarre I. She was no longer needed as a second ferry on the Lyngen route, but was for the mean time as a reserve.

=== Service in the Comoros ===
The ship was bought by Sourette Misbahou. Originally from France, he moved to the Comoros at age 14. After twenty years, he had made enough money to buy a ferry to start a passenger shipping service in the Comoros. To raise money, he had among other things sold his apartment in Marseille. This was used to pay for the ferry, hire a crew of four to sail it down, and for diesel.

The ship left Lyngseidet on 11 April for Skjervøy, where she was hauled out for maintenance. She departed Skjerøy 1 May for Egersund, where she arrived on 10 May for a major overhaul.

From May to August 2005, the ship was stuck in Egersund. Increasing diesel prices and a weakening of the euro meant that Misbahou had run out of money. The crew was running a flea market on the ship to raise the necessary cash to buy 100,000 liters of diesel needed to take the ferry back.

Misbahou renamed the ship Shissiwani 2 and moved her port of registry to Mutsamudu, Comoros. Based on the island of Anjouan, she was used for services to Madagascar and Zanzibar.

Shissiwani 2 was used to transport by Sudanese paratroopers during the 2008 invasion of Anjouan. After the operation, she returned to her regular duties. The regular route to Tanzania was about 700 kilometers (430 mi), taking three days. The ship caught on fire in January 2009. The cause was found to be non-compliance with a number of fire safety standards.

In May 2022, she was on route from Toamasina to have an engine repaired, when she ran out of diesel off the coast of Madagascar. She ran aground near Vohemar. The owners could not afford a tow to get her loose. Instead, the local population started stripping her of parts. She therefore remains stranded.
