= Carriacou =

Island in Grenada

Native name: Kayryouacou Nickname: Land of Reefs
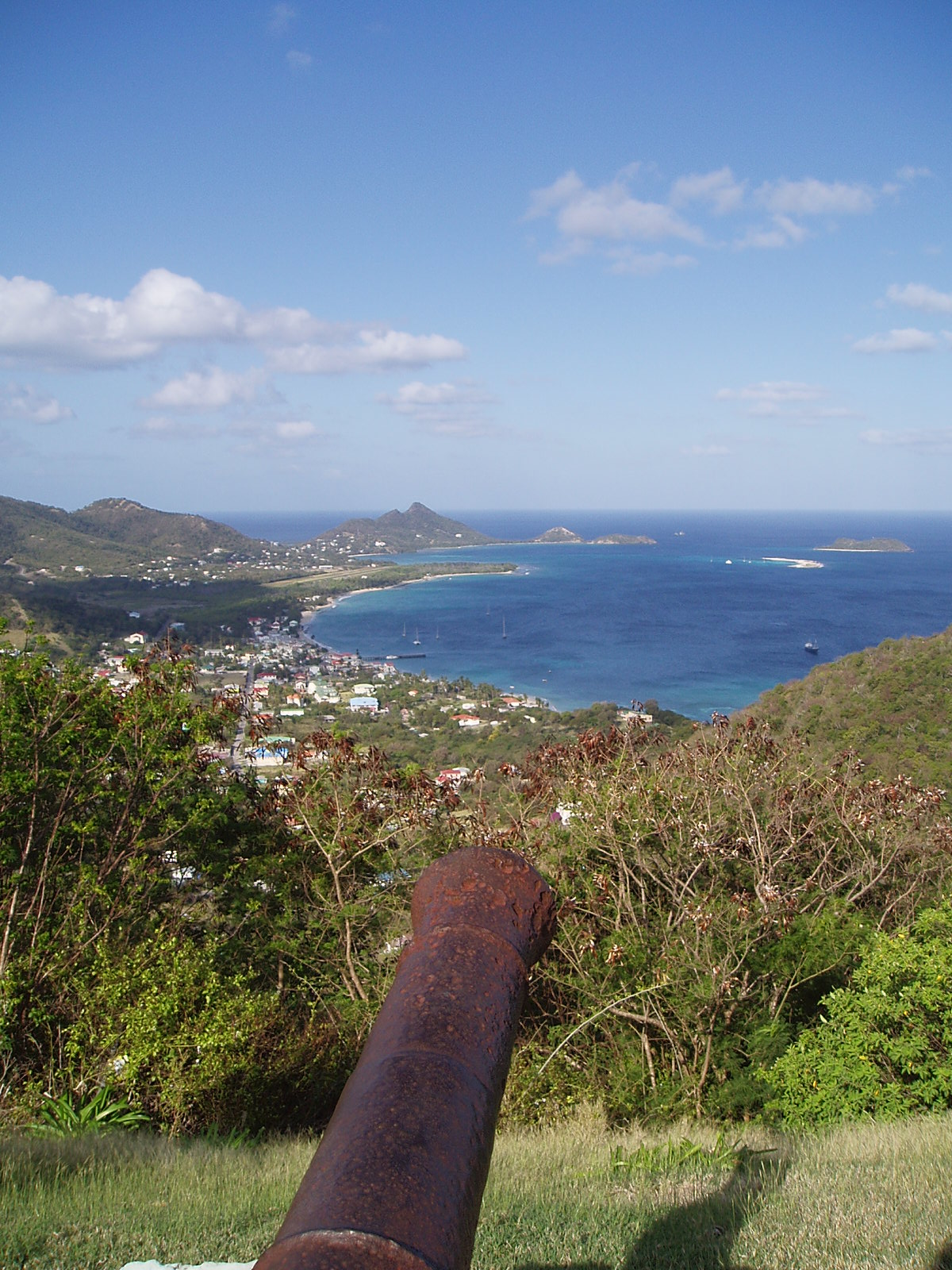
- A view of Hillsborough, the capital of Carriacou

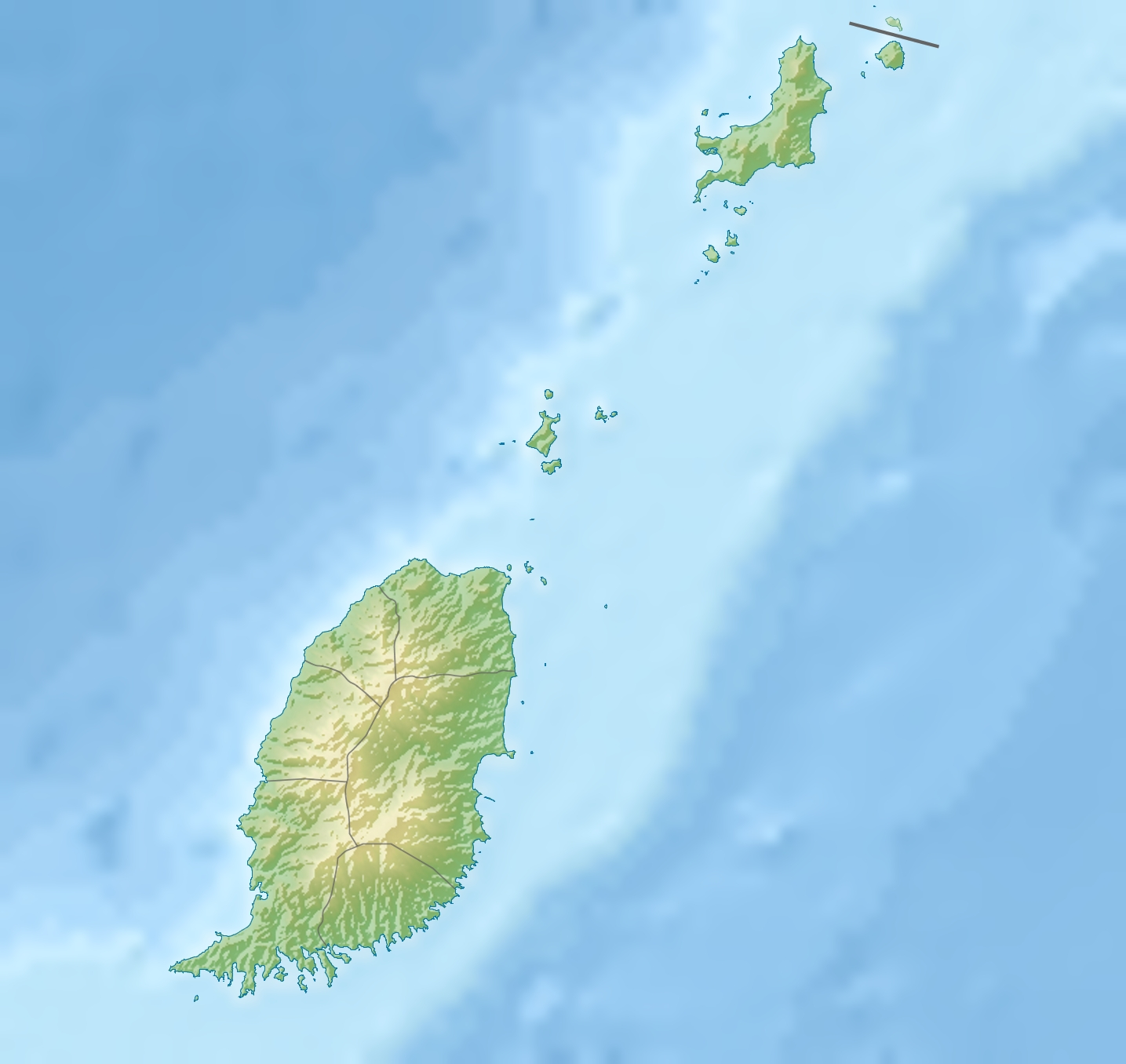
- Location within Grenada Location within Lesser Antilles Location within the Caribbean

Geography
- Location: Caribbean
- Coordinates: 12°28′00″N 61°27′00″W
- Archipelago: Grenadines
- Area: 12 sq mi (31 km^{2})
- Length: 7 mi (11 km)
- Width: 2 mi (3 km)
- Highest elevation: 956 ft (291.4 m)
- Highest point: High North Peak

Administration
- Grenada
- Dependency: Carriacou and Petite Martinique
- Largest settlement: Hillsborough (pop. 1,200)
- Prime Minister of Grenada: Dr. Dickon Amiss Thomas Mitchell

Demographics
- Population: 6,000
- Ethnic groups: African, European, Native people.

Carriacou (/ˈkɛəriəˌku/ KAIR-ee-ə-KOO) is an island of the Grenadine Islands. It is a part of the nation of Grenada and is located in the south-eastern Caribbean Sea, northeast of the island of Grenada and the north coast of South America. The name is derived from the Kalinago language Kayryouacou.

== Government ==
Carriacou is part of the Carriacou and Petite Martinique constituency in the Grenadian parliament. Despite being guaranteed local government by the Grenadian constitution, no such local government has ever been established.

== Geography ==
Carriacou is the largest island in the Grenada Grenadines. It is also the largest island in the Grenadine Islands (Vincentian and Grenadian Grenadines). It is located at latitude 12° 28' N, longitude 61° 27' W.

== Facts ==
Carriacou is home to 6,000 people. The capital city is Hillsborough, the only town or city on the island. The port authority is located in Tyrell Bay, where the ferry from Grenada docks. The bay, with its various bars and restaurants, is a popular anchorage and used by yachts to shelter from hurricanes. Nearby lies the Sandy Island/Oyster Bed Marine Protected Area (SIOBMPA). Most of the other island settlements are small villages. There are more than 100 rum shops in Carriacou. Carriacou is home to the late former prime minister Sir Nicholas Braithwaite and Herbert Augustus Blaize, the founder of GNP (Grenada National Party) and the former Chief Minister of Grenada. Carriacou is a popular vacation destination for both Grenadians and foreign visitors, many of whom arrive by yacht. Noteworthy beaches in Carriacou include Paradise Beach and Anse La Roche. European (English or French) dances, such as the Quadrille, are still popular on the island today. The Big Drum dance is the most popular dance on the island and is performed on special occasions.

== Diving ==
Carriacou is known as the "Isle of Reefs", and features some of the most unspoiled coral reefs in the region. Most diving takes place on the calmer Caribbean side of the island, where 33 dive sites suitable for all levels of divers can be found. Depths range from 12 m (39 ft) down to a maximum of 30 m (98 ft). Visibility is good throughout the year, with excellent opportunities for underwater photography.

Carriacou's dive sites include coral reefs and schools of fish. Conditions range from the sheltered sites suited to beginners and underwater photography to drift dives in stronger currents. The island has two wreck dives, the tugboats Westsider and Boris, each 30 m (98 ft) long, which were deliberately sunk as dive sites in 2004 and 2007 respectively.

== Underwater fauna ==
As well as all the usual Caribbean reef fish, large nurse sharks, barracudas, Southern and roughtail stingrays, as well as spotted eagle rays, hawksbill and green sea turtles are frequently sighted. During the summer months spectacular schools of silversides may be seen. During late spring, humpback whales migrate past the island, and their song can be heard by scuba divers from a long way off.

== Climate ==
	Celsius °C	Fahrenheit °F
Land	27-32	80-85
Sea	26-30	78-82

Dry season is from January to June and the rainy season is from July to December.

=== Hurricanes ===
The first record of a hurricane on the island was on August 14, 1944. In 1955, the second floor of the Beausejour great house was blown away by Hurricane Janet. Recent hurricanes include Hurricane Ivan on September 7, 2004, Hurricane Emily on July 13, 2005, and most recently Hurricane Beryl, which became the strongest to hit the island, making landfall on July 1, 2024, as a high-end category 4 hurricane. Beryl was said to have "flattened" the island.

== History ==
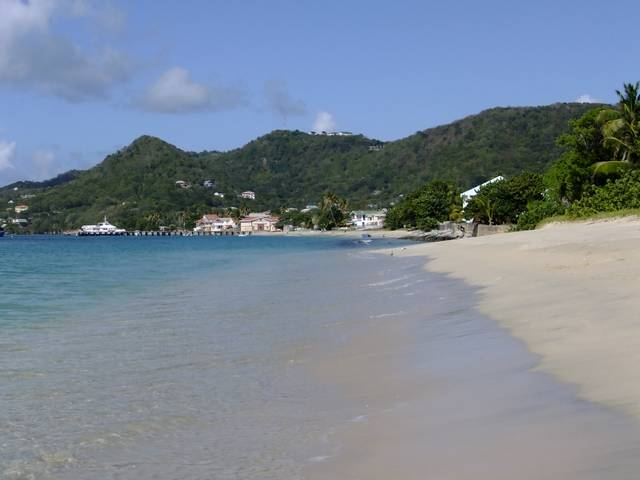
View of Hillsborough town & jetty

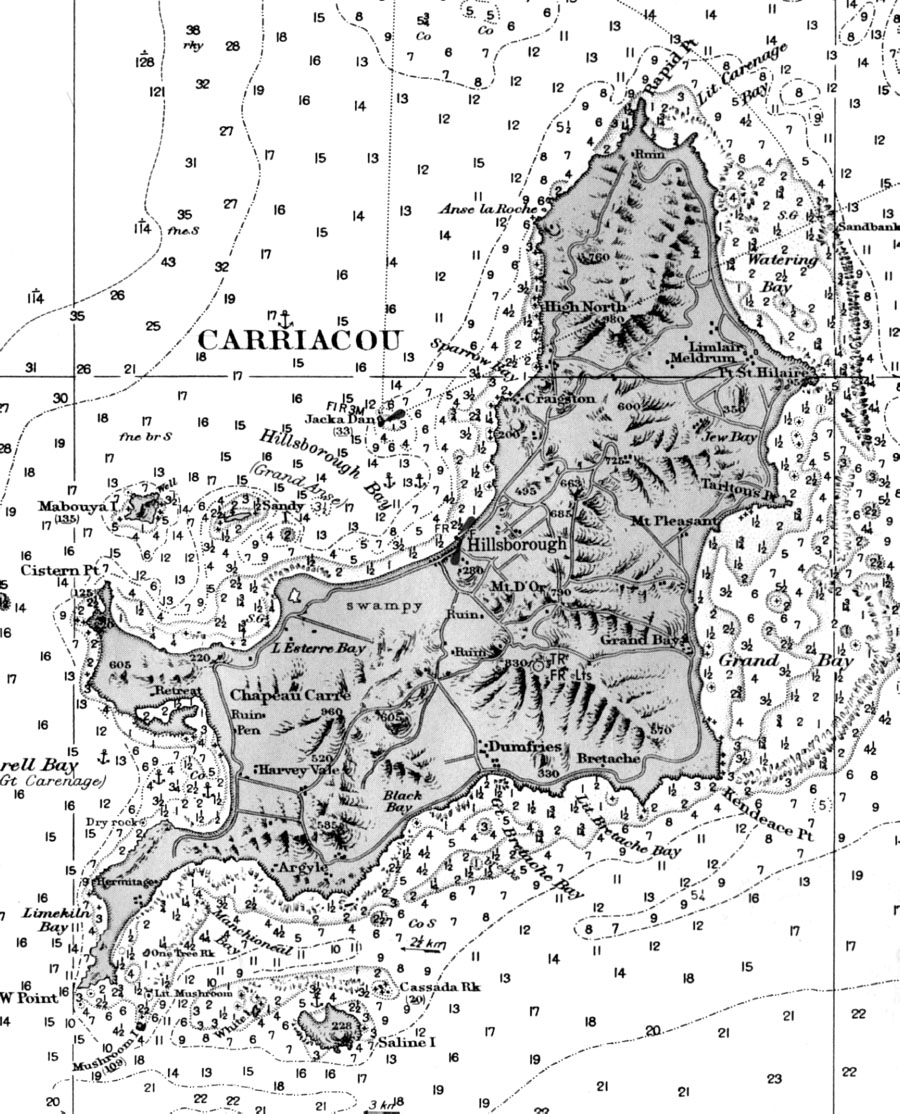
Nautical Chart of Carriacou from 1891

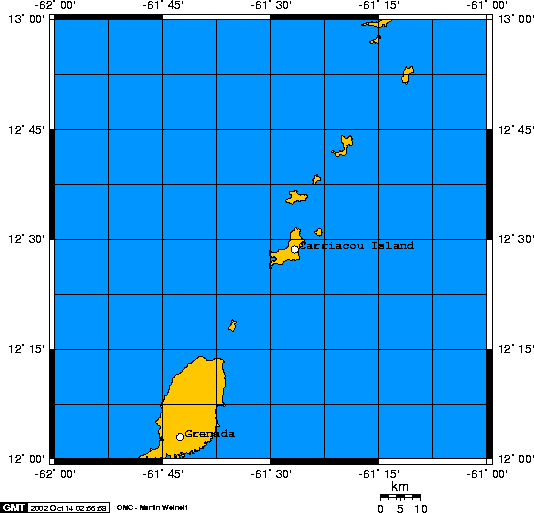
Map of Carriacou Island near Grenada

Between 500 and 1000 AD\CE, Amerindians came to Carriacou. These Carib settlers called Carriacou Kayryouacou, meaning "the land of reefs."

In 1656, Jean-Baptiste Du Tertre, a turtle fisherman living in Guadeloupe, visited Carriacou. He was the first recorded French/European person to visit the island. It was colonized first by the French among the European newcomers.

In 1720, Bartholomew Roberts captured a French ship near Carriacou and commandeered it, renaming it the Royal Fortune.

In 1750, the first census of the island was conducted. It recorded 199 people (92 Whites, 92 Blacks and 15 Mixed Race, people of African descent were mostly slaves) living in Carriacou.

In 1763 near the end of the Seven Years' War, Carriacou was ceded with Grenada by the French to the British after their defeat in the war. In addition, the British had captured neighbouring Grenada. In 1776, the island population was 3,239 (86 Whites and 3,153 slaves), not counting the free Blacks and the free Mulattos or people of colour. In 1791, Gun Point (Rapid Point), which had been a division of the Grenadines, was made a latitude on the island. The Point belonged to Saint Vincent and the rest of Carriacou belonged to Grenada.

In 1845 multiple Portuguese settlers from Madeira arrived in the Caribbean including in Carriacou.

In 1870, Stephen Joseph Perry led a British government expedition to observe a solar eclipse at Carriacou. In the 19th century, the Pierrot Mas was first introduced to Carriacou. In 1922, Petite Charles first introduced the Jab Jab (Devil) Mas to Carriacou. The telephone system began operating in 1961 on Carriacou. Bishop's College was the first secondary school in Carriacou; it was opened in 1964 by the Anglican Church. In 1965, the Carriacou Regatta began. In 1965?1968 Lauriston airport/airstrip was opened. On October 31, 1975, the Carriacou Carib Organization (CCO) began.

The inhabitants of Carriacou perform the "Big Drum" or "Nation," dance which celebrates their West African ancestors who were brought to the island during slavery. These Big Drum dances are usually performed at "Maroons" village festivals or fetes, where food and drink are prepared. They can also be danced at wakes and tombstone feasts in honour of dead relatives. The Quadrille dance is also performed on the island during festivals and historic events.

A traditional boat-building culture located in the village of Windward, on the north-eastern side of the island. Carriacou's people of Scottish and Irish ancestry are concentrated here.

Carriacouans have migrated to the United Kingdom, and especially to the county town of Huddersfield. Other English locations where Kayaks (nickname for people from Carriacou) congregate is London. The rector of St Stephens is the Archbishop of Canterbury's Visitor to the Windward Island diocese. The United States, particularly New York City, is home to a significant number of Carriacouans. Many Carriacouans do return for holidays or to retire "back home".

Limes and citrus products were the leading exports during the 18th century.

=== Colonial history ===
On 27 September 1650, Jacques du Parquet bought Grenada from the Compagnie des Iles de l'Amérique, which was dissolved, for the equivalent of £1160. In 1657, Jacques du Parquet sold Grenada to Jean de Faudoas, Comte de Sérillac for the equivalent of £1890. In 1664, King Louis XIV bought out the independent island owners and established the French West India Company. In 1674 the French West India Company was dissolved. Proprietary rule ended in Grenada, which became a French colony.

Carriacou was part of the French colony in 1762. Following French defeat in the Seven Years' War, it ceded its territories to Britain. The island was part of the British Grenada colony from 1763 to 1779 and 1783–1974. It was part of French Grenada colony from 1779 to 1783. It has been a dependency of Grenada since 1974.

On November 1, 1983, during Operation Urgent Fury, two companies from the 22nd Marine Amphibious Unit made a combined sea and helicopter landing on Carriacou. The nineteen Grenadian soldiers defending the island surrendered without a fight. This was the last military action of the campaign.

== Native name ==
In the 17th and 18th centuries, Carriacou was spelled 'Kayryouacou' in Carib.

== Notable residents ==
- Herbert Augustus Blaize - former Chief Minister of Grenada
- Canute Caliste - native painter and quadrille violinist
- Leonard James Paterson - father of Basil Paterson, grandfather of David Paterson
- Linda Lorde - mother of writer Audre Lorde
- Malvina Wells (1804-1887), born in Carriacou, only known person buried in Edinburgh who was born a slave

== In literature ==
- Carriacou and the Big Drum are featured in Paule Marshall's novel Praisesong for the Widow.
- The memory of Carriacou (from which her parents emigrated to New York) figures prominently in Audre Lorde's autobiographical work Zami: A New Spelling of My Name.

== In film ==
- The Sailor (2021), directed by Lucia Kašová, is a documentary portrait of sailor Paul Johnson, who lived aboard his boat on Carriacou. The film was shot on the island and in the surrounding waters.

== Panorama ==
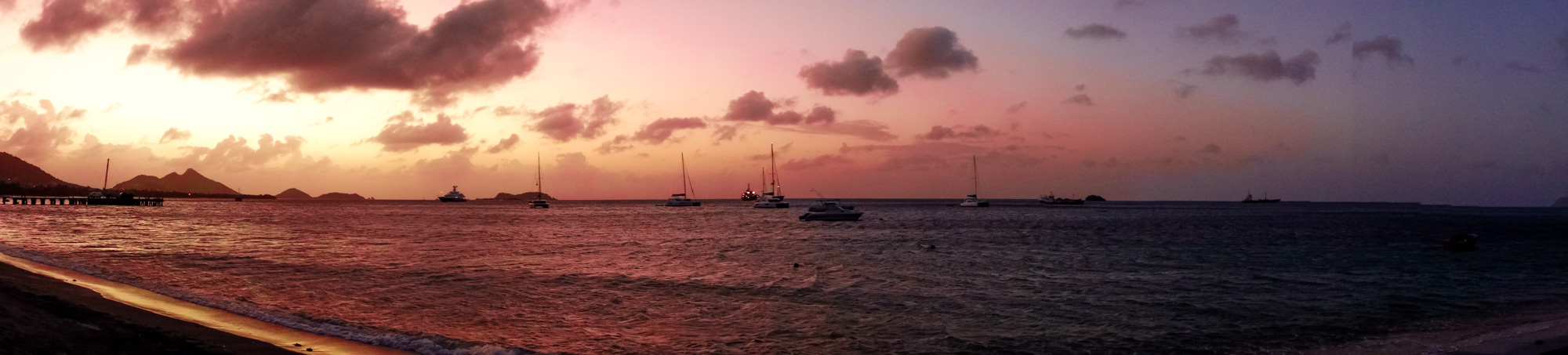
Panoramic view on Carriacou

== See also ==
- Rough Science
- Carriacou and Petite Martinique
