= MF Goalsevarre (1972) =

Ship built in 1972

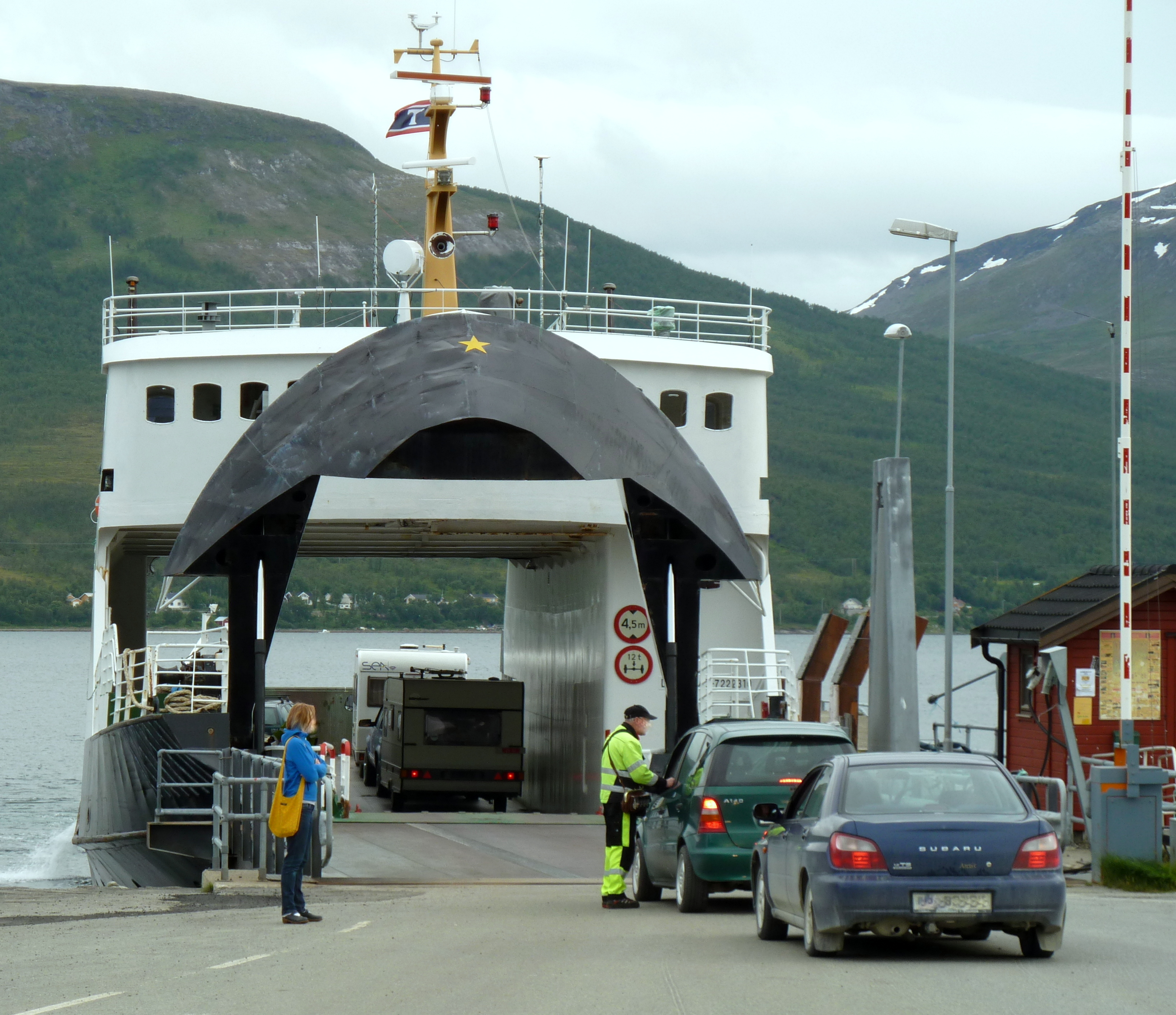
- MF Salangen at Hansnes in 2010

History
- Name: MF Goalsevarre (1972–2004); MF Salangen (2004–17); MV Dolly C (2017–)
- Namesake: Goalsevárri; Salangen
- Owner: Bjørklids Ferjerederi (1972–2004); Troms Fylkes Dampskibsselskap (2004–06); Hurtigruten (2006–09); Torghatten Nord (2009–17); Private Partnership (2017–)
- Operator: Bjørklids Ferjerederi (1972–2004); Troms Fylkes Dampskibsselskap (2000–06); Hurtigruten (2006–09); Torghatten Nord (2009–17); Private Partnership (2017–)
- Port of registry: Tromsø (1972–2017); Kingstown (2017–)
- Route: Lyngseidet–Olderdalen; Breivikseidet–Svensby; Storstein–Lauksundskaret–Nikkeby; Stornes–Bjørnera–Alvestad; Hansnes–Stakkvik; Tyrrel Bay–St. George's
- Builder: Tromsø Skibsverft & mek. Verksted
- Yard number: 40
- Completed: July 1972
- Identification: IMO number: 7222310; Call sign: LGXC
- Fate: Abandoned after running aground in Grenada on 7 March 2025

General characteristics
- Type: Ferry
- Tonnage: 430 GRT / 182 NRT
- Length: 44.8 m (147 ft)
- Beam: 10.58 m (34.7 ft)
- Draught: 4.22 m (13.8 ft)
- Installed power: 730 kW (991 hp)
- Propulsion: Wichmann diesel engine
- Speed: 12 kn (22 km/h; 14 mph)
- Capacity: 32 cars; 250 passengers

MF Goalsevarre was a roll-on/roll-off passenger and road vehicle ferry built in 1972 by Tromsø Skibsverft & mek. Verksted. She was delivered to Bjørklids Ferjerederi, who put her into service on the Lyngseidet–Olderdalen crossing of Lyngen in Troms, Norway. She was later used on the Breivikseidet–Svensby service across Ullsfjorden, and was moved between the two routes several times.

She was leased to Troms Fylkes Dampskibsselskap (TFDS) in 2000 and used on several routes, before TFDS bought her outright in 2004. She was renamed MF Salangen and put into service on the Hansnes–Stakkvik crossing. She remained there until 2017, when she was sold. She was named MV Dolly C, based on the Grenada island of Carriacou. She mostly operated services between Tyrrel Bay and St. George's, but also some other destinations. She ran aground on 7 March 2025 and subsequently abandoned.

== Specifications ==
The vessel was a steel, single-direction, roll-on/roll-off passenger and road vehicle ferry. She has an overall length of 44.8 meters (147 ft), a beam of 10.80 meters (35.4 ft) and a draught of 4.22 meters (13.8 ft). This gave her her a register tonnage of 430 gross and 182 net. She has a capacity for 32 passenger car equivalents and 250 passengers. She was equipped with a Wichmann two-stroke, six-cylinder diesel engine with a power output of 730 kW (991 hp). This allowed her to cruise at 12 knots (22 km/h; 14 mph).

== History ==
=== Service in Norway ===
By the early 1970s, Bjørklids was in need for a new and larger ferry for the Lyngseidet–Olderdalen route. At the worst, waiting times at Lyngseidet and Olderdalen were up to five hours. Bjørklids therefore ordered MF Goalsevarre with delivery in June 1972, to compliment MF Jæggevarre on the service.

The section of E6 along the east shore of Lyngen opened in 1974, creating a fixed link for the E6 along Lyngen. Traffic fell overnight by 40 percent, as traffic heading south no longer needed to cross the fjord. Goalsevarre was moved from Lyngen to Ullsfjorden, where she served the Breivikseidet–Svensby route.

She was moved back to Lyngen and the Lyngseidet–Olderdalen route in March 1993. This followed the delivery of MF Vaggasvarre, which was put into service on the Ullsfjorden route. This situation lasted until 2000, when the used ferry MF Stallovarre was procured for the Lyngen service. The following year, MF Jæggevarre was bought for the Ullsfjorden route, and Vaggasvarre took over as a reserve. This left Goalsevarre without any function, and she could be retired from Bjørklids' fleet.

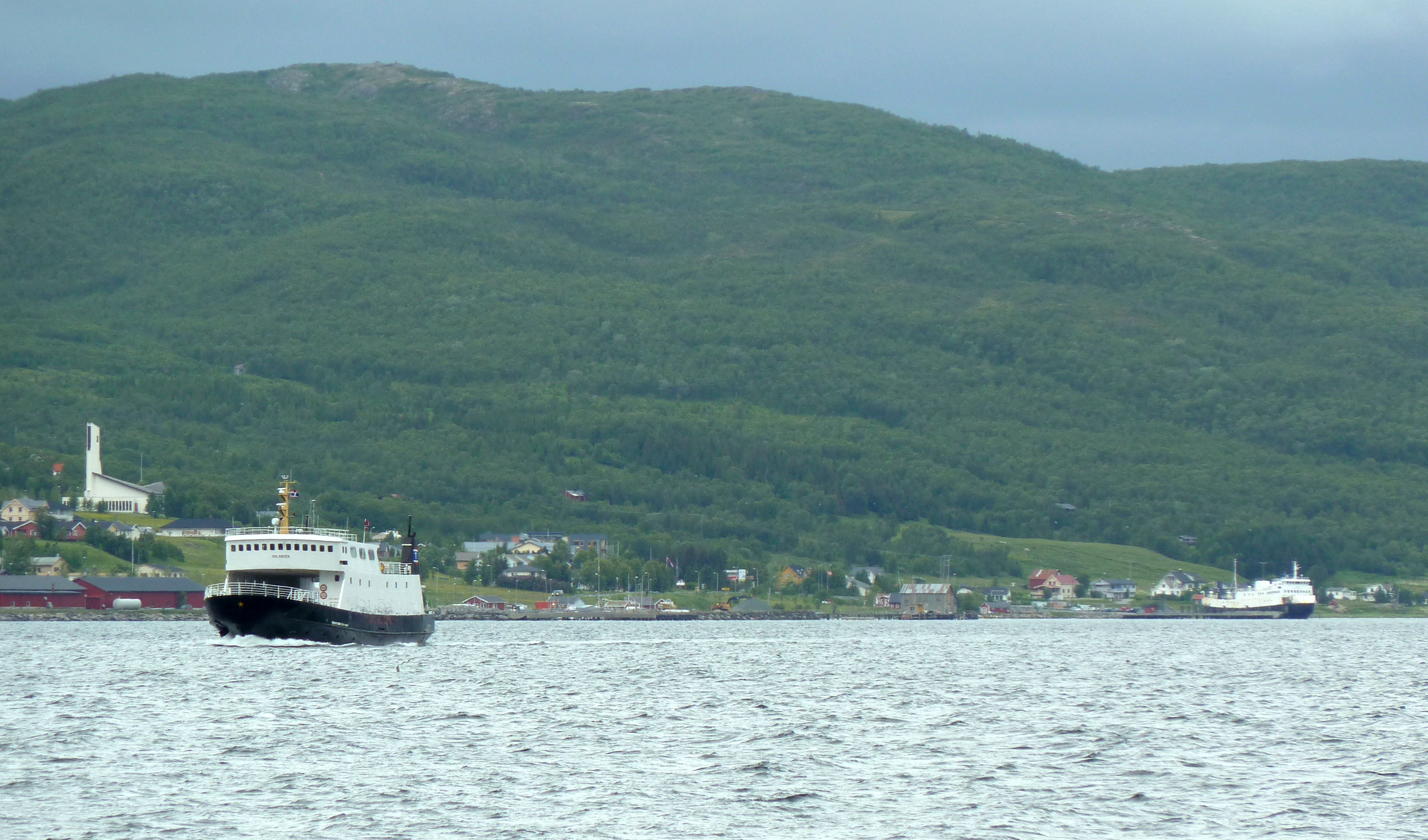
MF Salangen en route to Stokknes, with Hansnes in the background. Also visible is MF Bognes.

Troms Fylkes Dampskibsselskap (TFDS) leased Goalsevarre from November 2000, and put her first into the Storstein–Lauksundskaret–Nikkeby service in Skjervøy Municipality. The ship was later that year moved to the Stornes–Bjørnera–Alvestad route. After 2001, she was stored.

TFDS bought her outright in December 2003. She was named MF Salangen and she was put into service on the Hansnes–Stakkvik route. Through a series of mergers and acquisitions, ownership and operations passed to Hurtigruten in 2006 and then Torghatten Nord in 2009.

=== Service in Grenada ===
The shipping company Private Partnership, trading as Dolly C, was founded by Denis Alexis to provide inter-island services within Grenada. Based at Tyrrel Bay on the island of Carriacou, it aimed at providing scheduled services to other destinations within Grenada. The company bought Salangen in 2017. Despite being based in and mostly operating within Grenada, Dolly C was registered in Saint Vincent and the Grenadines and her port of registry being Kingstown.

For her ferrying to Grenada, Dolly C departed Tromsø on 12 November 2017. Upon reaching Falmouth, United Kingdom, on 28 November, the vessel was placed in arrest due to technical non-compliances. She departed from there again on 21 February 2018 and arrived at Carriacou on 21 March.

Dolly C operated on regular schedules between St. George's on the main island of Grenada and Tyrrel Bay, the only port on Carriacou. Services were provided with three weekly round trips (Monday, Wednesday and Friday) departing Garriacou in the early morning, with a one-way crossing taking four hours. The ferry returned for an evening arrival on Carriacou. It made less frequent services to the neighboring island of Petite Martinique, Sandy Island and Clifton on Union Island in the Saint Vincent and the Grenadines. The ferry took passengers, road vehicles and cargo.

Carriacou was severely hit by Hurricane Beryl in July 2024. Dolly C was blown onto the sands. It took three weeks before she was pulled back into deep water.

Dolly C ran aground on the coast of the island of Grenada outside Maurice Bishop International Airport on 7 March 2025. The vessel has not been salvaged and remains aground but floating in the bay, abandoned by her owners.
