= Lyngen =

Lyngen may refer to:

== Places ==
- Lyngen Municipality, a municipality in Troms county, Norway
- Lyngen (fjord), a fjord in Troms county, Norway
- Lyngen Alps, a mountain range in Troms county, Norway
- Lyngen Church, a church in Lyngen municipality in Troms county, Norway
- Lyngen Peninsula, a peninsula in Troms county, Norway

== Other ==
- Lyngen horse, a horse breed originating in Northern Norway
- Lyngen Line, a defensive line in Norway during Operation Nordlicht in World War II
- Lyngen/Karnes IL, a sports club in Lyngen municipality in Troms county, Norway
