= Store Lenangstind =

Mountain in Lyngen, Norway

- Store Lenangstinden
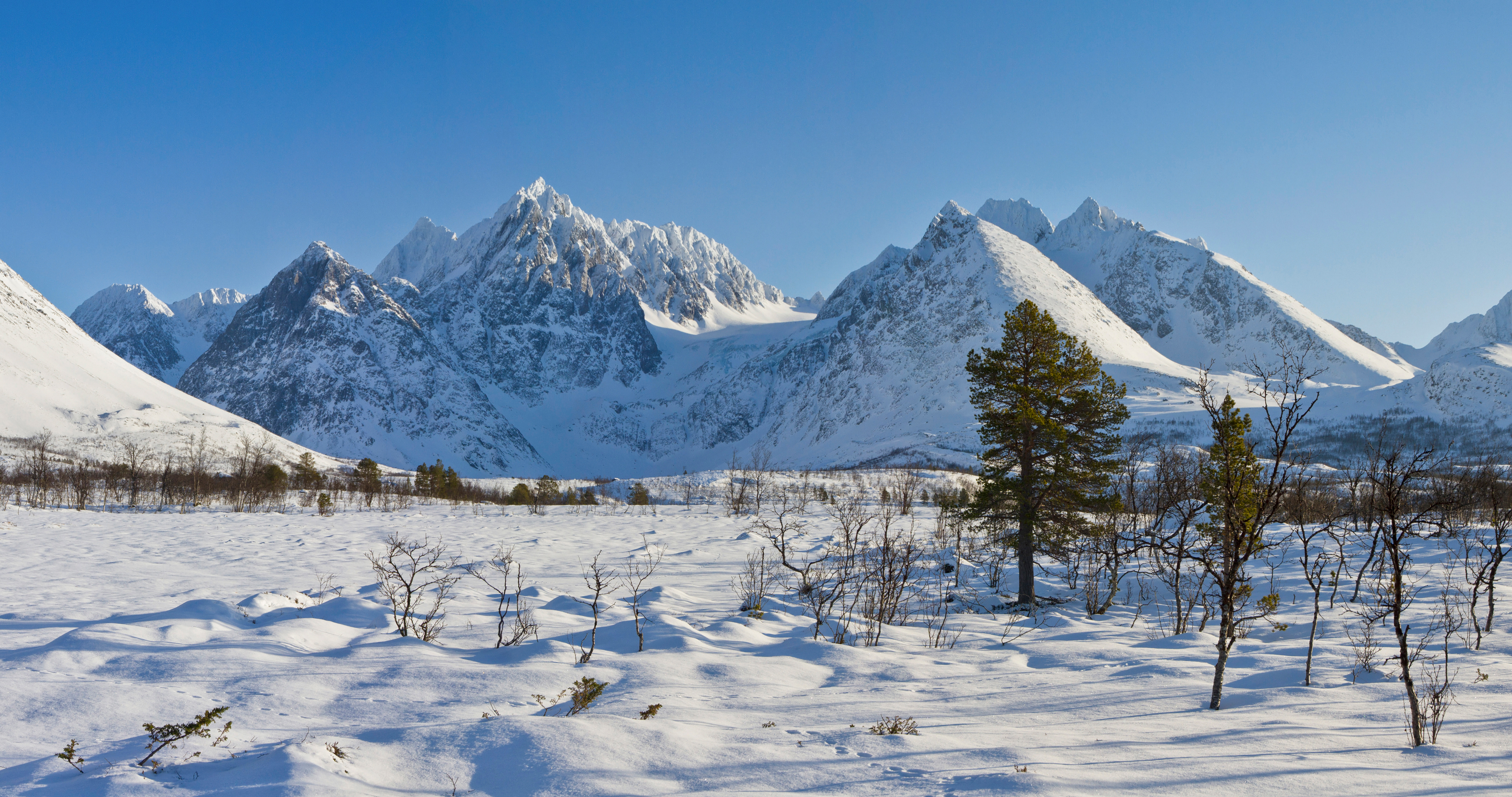
- Lenangstind (left) and Jægervasstind, viewed from the NW

Highest point
- Elevation: 1,624 m (5,328 ft)
- Prominence: 1,576 m (5,171 ft)
- Listing: Ultra prominent peak 4th on list of peaks in Norway by prominence
- Coordinates: 69.7092°N 20.0911°E

Geography
- Location of the mountain
- Location: Troms, Norway
- Parent range: Lyngsalpene
- Topo map: 1634 III Lyngen

Store Lenangstind or Store Lenangstinden is a mountain in Lyngen Municipality in Troms county, Norway. It is within the Lyngen Alps mountain range and has the fourth-highest primary factor in Norway. It is located about 15.5 kilometres (9.6 mi) northwest of the village of Lyngseidet, just west of the Lyngenfjorden. The Strupbreen glacier lies along the southeastern side of the mountain.

Its ascent involves easy glacier crossings, steep snow climbing, and easy rock scrambling. This peak is for experienced mountaineers only.

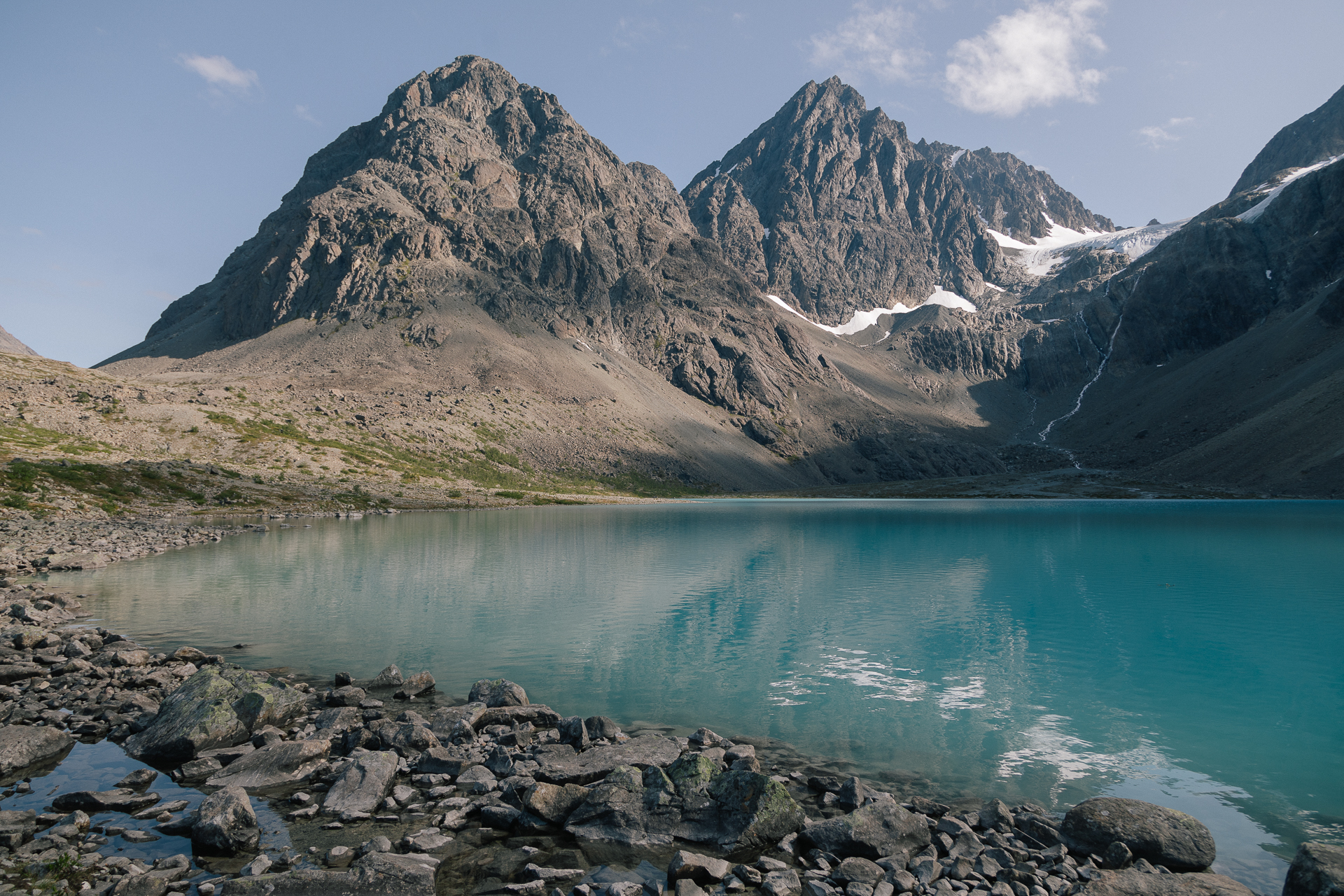
Lake Blåvatnet, Lenangstind mountain and Lenangsbreene glaciers
