= Gollis =

Norwegian tourist attraction

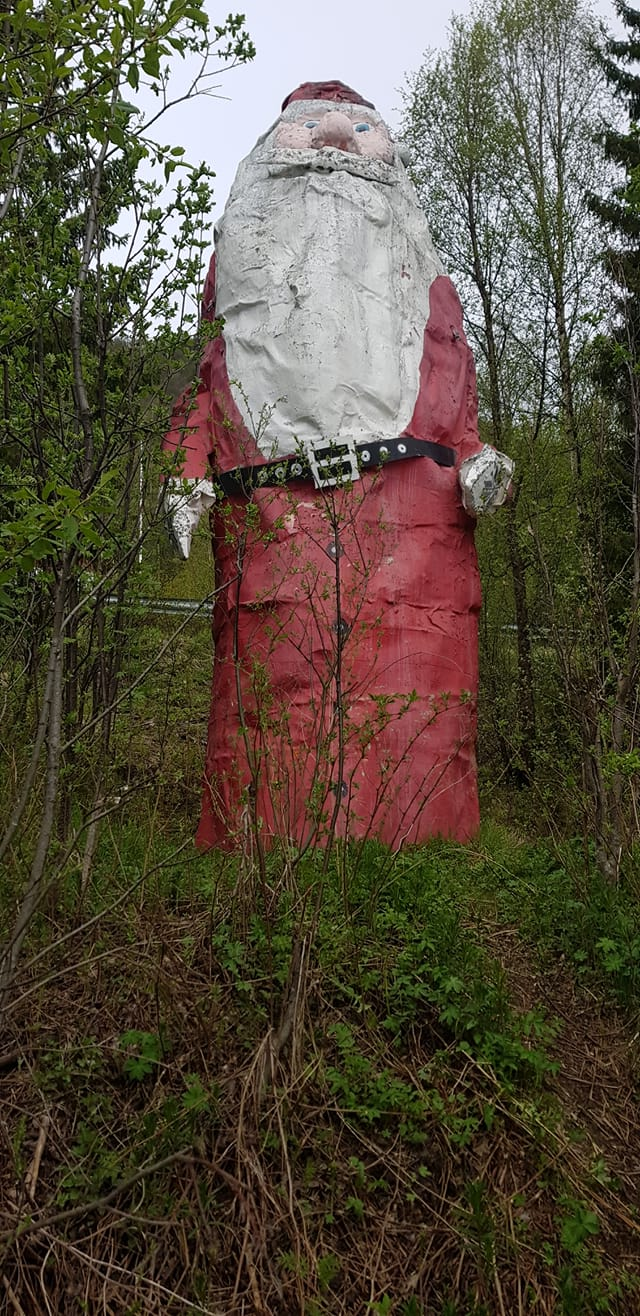
- Year: 1992
- Medium: Plastic
- Subject: Santa Claus
- Dimensions: 9 m (30 ft)
- Location: Lyngseidet
- 69°35′N 20°13′E

Gollis is a Norwegian tourist attraction. It is a 9-metre (30 ft) tall Santa Claus made out of plastic materials. It is located in Lyngseidet in Lyngen Municipality in Troms county. Lyngseidet is 15 km north of the village of Furuflaten and 12 km by ferry from Olderdalen.

It has been claimed to be the world's biggest Santa Claus.

== History ==
Standing at a towering height of 32 feet, this Lyngen sculpture is inspired by the spirit of Christmas. Gollis was built in 1992. The idea behind the structure was to create a Santa Claus figure that was represented a symbol of the town's connection to Christmas traditions, particularly linked to the local folklore and history of Santa Claus.

It is popular with tourists, but the locals are divided in their views. It has been voted the ugliest tourist attraction in Norway in the newspaper Verdens Gang.
