= Strupbreen =

Glacier in Lyngen Municipality, Norway

- Interactive map of the glacier
- Type: Valley
- Location: Troms, Norway
- Coordinates: 69.7079°N 20.1578°E
- Area: 8.7 km^{2} (3.4 sq mi)

Strupbreen is a glacier located in Lyngen Municipality in Troms county, Norway. The 8.7-square-kilometre (3.4 sq mi) glacier is located in the Lyngen Alps, about 12 kilometres (7.5 mi) north of the village of Lyngseidet. Historically, the glacier has at times reached all the way down to the Lyngenfjorden. Today the end of the glacier lies about 2 kilometres (1.2 mi) from the shoreline, with a small stream of water flowing from the glacier to the fjord.

The glacier, at about its Little Ice Age maximum extent shed ice blocks onto the shoreline below. This formed a cone of ice separated from the main glacier snout. This cone was used as an ice supply for fishing vessels.

The glacier and its associated ice-dammed lake were investigated by the University of Leicester Arctic Norway Expedition in 1969. Publications arising from this include work on the size and retreat of Strupbreen and on the drainage of the lake Strupvatnet. The ice dammed lake, Strupvatnet, was first explored by the English climbers William Cecil Slingsby and Geoffrey Hastings and the Norwegian Elias Hogrenning in 1898.
