= Lenangsøyra Chapel =

- Lenangsøyra kapell
- Lenangsøyra Chapel
- 69.8214696°N 19.9840209°E
- Location: Lyngen, Troms
- Country: Norway
- Denomination: Church of Norway
- Churchmanship: Evangelical Lutheran

History
- Status: Parish church
- Founded: 1996
- Consecrated: 1996

Architecture
- Functional status: Active
- Architect: Arkibygg ved J. Gjerdrum
- Architectural type: Fan-shaped church
- Completed: 1996 (30 years ago)

Specifications
- Capacity: 120
- Materials: Concrete block

Administration
- Diocese: Nord-Hålogaland
- Deanery: Nord-Troms prosti
- Parish: Lyngen

Lenangsøyra Chapel (Norwegian: Lenangsøyra kapell) is a parish church of the Church of Norway in Lyngen Municipality in Troms county, Norway. It is located in the village of Lenangsøyra on the Lyngen Peninsula. It is one of the churches for the Lyngen parish which is part of the Nord-Troms prosti (deanery) in the Diocese of Nord-Hålogaland. The white, concrete church was built in a fan-shaped style in 1996 to serve the northern part of the municipality of Lyngen. The church was designed by the architectural firm Arkibygg ved J. Gjerdrum. The church seats about 120 people.

== See also ==
- List of churches in Nord-Hålogaland
