= Maria Nysted Grønvoll =

Norwegian cross-country skier

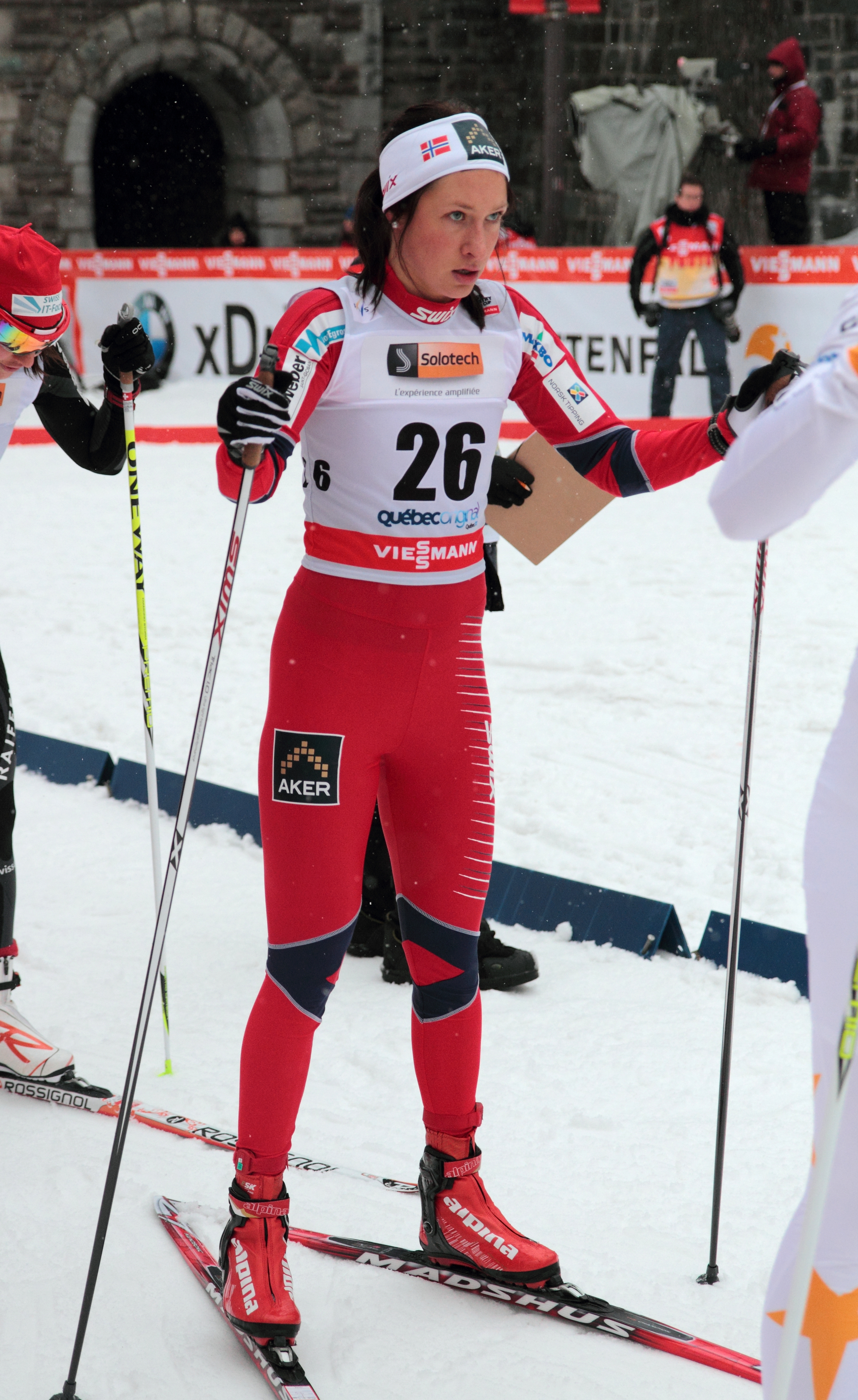
Maria Nysted Grønvoll, 2012.

Maria Nysted Grønvoll (born 1985 in Furuflaten in Lyngen Municipality) is a retired Norwegian cross-country skier.

She made her World Cup debut in the March 2008 Drammen sprint race. Not competing in the World Cup again until January 2011, she then collected her first World Cup points with a 28th place in Liberec and an 18th place in Drammen, both sprint events. In 2011–12 she collected World Cup points in three sprints, and did so twice in 2012–13, with 18th and 17th places. Her last World Cup outing came at the March 2014 Drammen sprint.

She represented the sports club Furuflaten IL.
