= Ola Krogseng Giæver =

Norwegian farmer and politician

- Born: 14 July 1885; Lyngseidet, Norway
- Died: 25 October 1966 (aged 81)
- Occupations: Farmer and politician

Ola Krogseng Giæver (14 July 1885 – 25 October 1966) was a Norwegian farmer and politician for the Conservative Party.

He was born in Lyngseidet. He served as mayor of Lyngen Municipality for four periods, from 1913 to 1925. He was a deputy member of the Parliament of Norway from 1922 to 1924 and a member from 1925 to 1927, representing Troms county.
