= Isaksen =

Isaksen is a Norwegian surname. In 2015, there were 4,719 people with this surname in Norway. The name is a patronymic meaning 'son of Isak'. Notable people with the surname include:

- Djóni Isaksen (a.k.a. Djóni í Geil; 1849–1912), Faroese politician
- Dorothy Isaksen (1930–2023), Australian politician
- Espen Isaksen (born 1979), Norwegian soccer player
- Eva Isaksen (born 1956), Norwegian film director
- Finn Isaksen (1924–1987), Norwegian politician
- Gustav Isaksen (born 2001), Danish soccer player
- Ingibjörg Ólöf Isaksen (born 1977), Icelandic politician
- Ingvild Isaksen (born 1989), Norwegian soccer player
- Jógvan Isaksen (born 1950), Faroese writer and literary historian
- Magnar Isaksen (1910–1979), Norwegian soccer player
- Margaux Isaksen (born 1991), American pentathlete
- Nadja Natalie Isaksen (born 1995), Danish politician
- Robin Isaksen (born 1977), Norwegian musician
- Runo Isaksen (born 1968), Norwegian writer
- Samuel Isaksen (born 1982), Norwegian soccer player
- Torbjørn Røe Isaksen (born 1978), Norwegian politician
- Trond Norén Isaksen (born 1981), Norwegian historian
- Gustav Isaksen (born 2001), Danish footballer
