= Runo =

Runo may refer to:

- King Runo, legendary king of Britain
- Ruño, an ethnic group of Peru
- Runö, an island in Estonia
- Cantos of the Kalevala
- Runo song, a form of oral poetry of the Finnic peoples

== People with the name ==
- Gösta Runö, Swedish athlete
- Runo Isaksen, Norwegian writer
- Steven Runo, Kenyan scientist

== See also ==
- Runnö, an island in the Oskarshamn archipelago of Sweden
- Runology
- A form of traditional Finnish poetry
