= Hege Lanes Steinlund =

Norwegian football referee

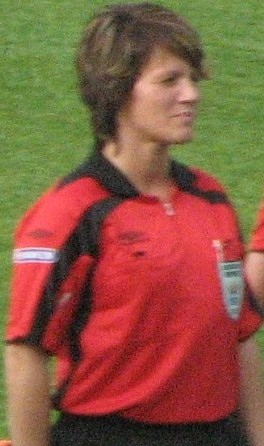
- Steinlund in 2007
- Born: 23 December 1969 (age 56); Furuflaten, Norway
- Other occupation: Teacher

Domestic
Years	League	Role
? – ?	1. divisjon	Assistant referee
2007–2013	Eliteserien	Assistant referee
? – 2013	Allsvenskan	Assistant referee

International
Years	League	Role
1997–2013	FIFA Listed	Assistant referee

Hege Lanes Steinlund (born 23 December 1969) is a Norwegian former football assistant referee, who officiated women's and men's matches in Norway and Sweden between 1986 and 2013. She is a FIFA-accredited referee, and is believed to have officiated in more international matches than any other Norwegian referee, male or female.

== Personal life ==
Steinlund is from Furuflaten, Norway. She has worked as a teacher at Bardufoss High School. Her husband is Swedish.

== Career ==
=== Domestic career ===
In 1986, Steinlund began refereeing in Troms as an assistant referee. In 2003, Steinlund broke her right leg and left arm in a car crash that left her with physical ailments. In 2004, she was declared fit enough to continue refereeing.

In 2007, Steinlund was assistant referee of a men's Eliteserien match, between Odd Grenland and Strømsgodset. It was the first time she had refereed an Eliteserien game, but she had previously been assistant referee at 1. divisjon matches. In 2010, she was assistant referee for the men's Norwegian Football Cup final. It was the first time that a woman had officiated the event. She also officiated in the Swedish Allsvenskan league.

Steinlund retired from refereeing in 2013. She had been a referee for 27 years, and had been assistant referee in 86 Eliteserien matches. The main reason for her retirement was due to her physical ailments from the car crash in 2003.

=== International career ===
In 1997, Steinlund became a FIFA-accredited referee. and in 2004, she began officiating international matches. She was not allowed to officiate matches involving Sweden, due to her work in the Swedish leagues and because her husband is Swedish. She was an assistant referee at the 2004 FIFA U-19 Women's World Championship, and the 2006 FIFA U-20 Women's World Championship. She had to request permission from her teaching job in order to attend the 2006 competition. Steinlund was an assistant referee at the 2007 FIFA Women's World Cup in China. Her final international match was the UEFA Women's Euro 2013 quarter final between Italy and Germany. She was the oldest assistant referee at the Championships. Steinlund is believed to have officiated in more international matches than any other Norwegian referee, male or female.
