= List of mountains in Norway by prominence =

This is a list of the mountains of Norway, ordered by their topographic prominence. On the island Jan Mayen, a Norwegian administered island northeast of Iceland, the volcano Beerenberg has a height and prominence 2,277 metres (7,470 ft), and on the island Spitsbergen in Svalbard, the mountain Newtontoppen has height and prominence 1,717 m (5,633 ft). For a list by height, see list of mountains in Norway by height.

Rank	Peak	Elevation (m)	Prominence (m)	Isolation (km)	Municipality	County
1	Galdhøpiggen	2469	2372	1570	Lom	Innlandet
2	Jiehkkevárri	1833	1741	140	Lyngen and Tromsø	Troms
3	Snøhetta	2286	1675	83	Dovre	Innlandet
4	Store Lenangstind	1625	1576	47	Lyngen	Troms
5	Gjegnen/Blånibba	1670	1460	47	Bremanger	Vestland
6	Hamperokken	1404	1396	18	Tromsø	Troms
7	Skårasalen	1542	1385	7	Ørsta	Møre og Romsdal
8	Oksskolten	1916	1384	185	Hemnes	Nordland
9	Botnafjellet	1572	1339	15	Gloppen	Vestland
10	Kvitegga	1717	1324	23	Stranda and Ørsta	Møre og Romsdal
11	Fresvikbreen	1660	1310	17	Vik	Vestland
12	Smørskredtindane	1630	1306	12	Stranda and Ørsta	Møre og Romsdal
13	Njunis	1717	1305	53	Målselv	Troms
14	Store Trolla	1850	1292	11	Sunndal	Møre og Romsdal
15	Langlitinden	1276	1276	26	Ibestad	Troms
16	Indre Russetind	1527	1268	9	Balsfjord	Troms
17	Møysalen	1262	1262	60	Sortland and Lødingen	Nordland
18	Stortind	1320	1242	14	Tromsø	Troms
19	Rondeslottet	2178	1232	54	Dovre, Folldal	Innlandet
20	Store Kågtinden	1228	1228	23	Skjervøy	Troms

== See also ==
- List of mountains in Norway by height
- List of mountains by prominence
