= Hamperokken =

Mountain in Troms, Norway

Hamperokken (Norwegian); Stuora Gáranasgáisi (Northern Sami)
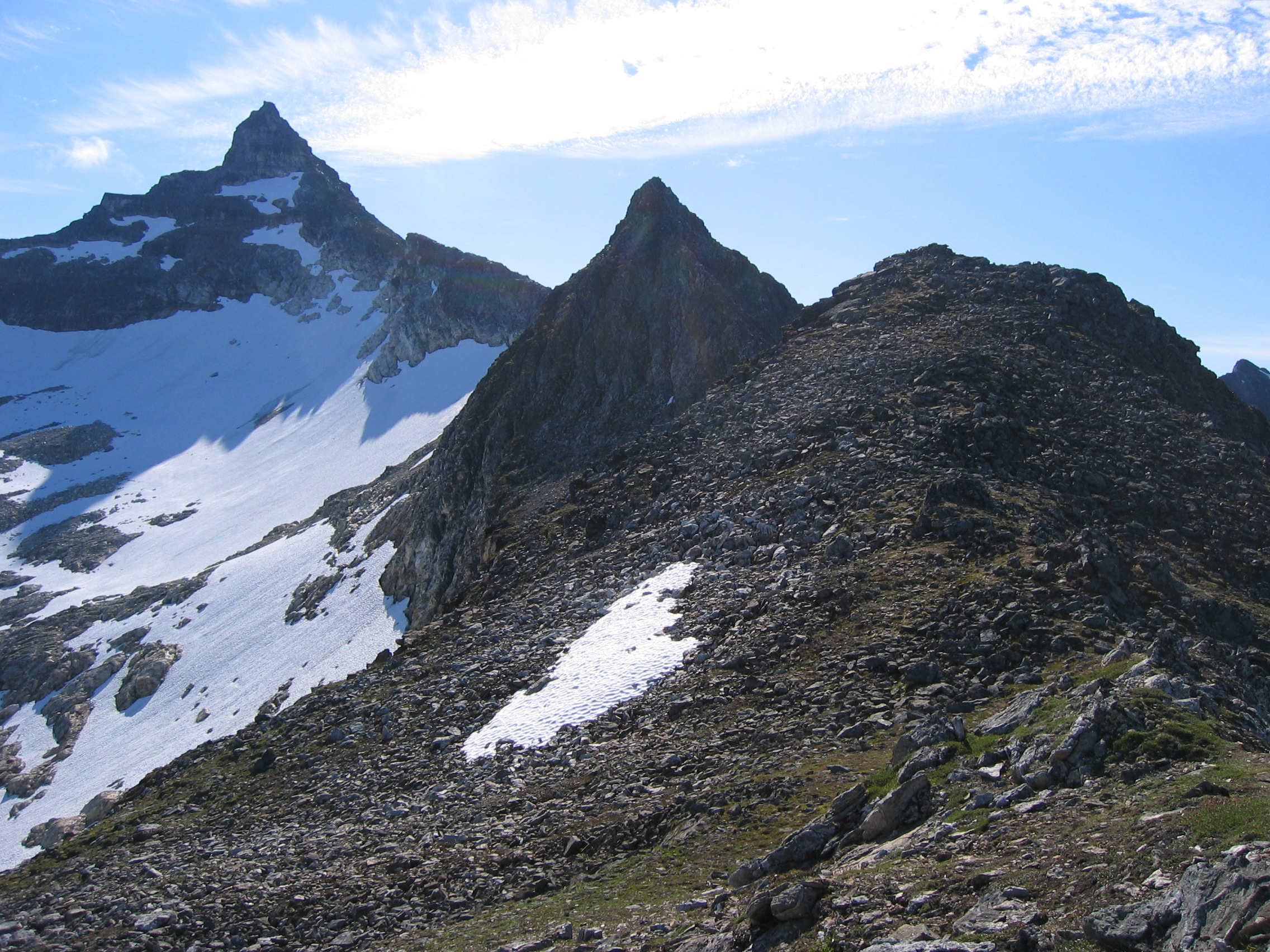
- Hamperokken peak to the left.

Highest point
- Elevation: 1,404 m (4,606 ft)
- Prominence: 1,393 m (4,570 ft)
- Listing: 6th most prominent peak in Norway
- Coordinates: 69.5598°N 19.3588°E

Geography
- Interactive map of the mountain
- Location: Troms, Norway
- Parent range: Tromsø
- Topo map: 1534 II Ullsfjord

Climbing
- Easiest route: Hike

Hamperokken (Norwegian) or Stuora Gáranasgáisi (Northern Sami) is a mountain in Tromsø Municipality in Troms county, Norway. At 1,404 metres (4,606 ft) tall, it is the highest mountain peak on the mainland peninsula west of the Ullsfjorden. Hamperokken has the 6th most prominent peak in Norway with a prominence of 1,393 metres (4,570 ft). The mountain sits about 6.7 kilometres (4.2 mi) east of the village of Fagernes and the European route E8 and it is also about 20 kilometres (12 mi) southeast of the city of Tromsø.
