= Jiehkkevárri =

Mountain in Troms, Norway

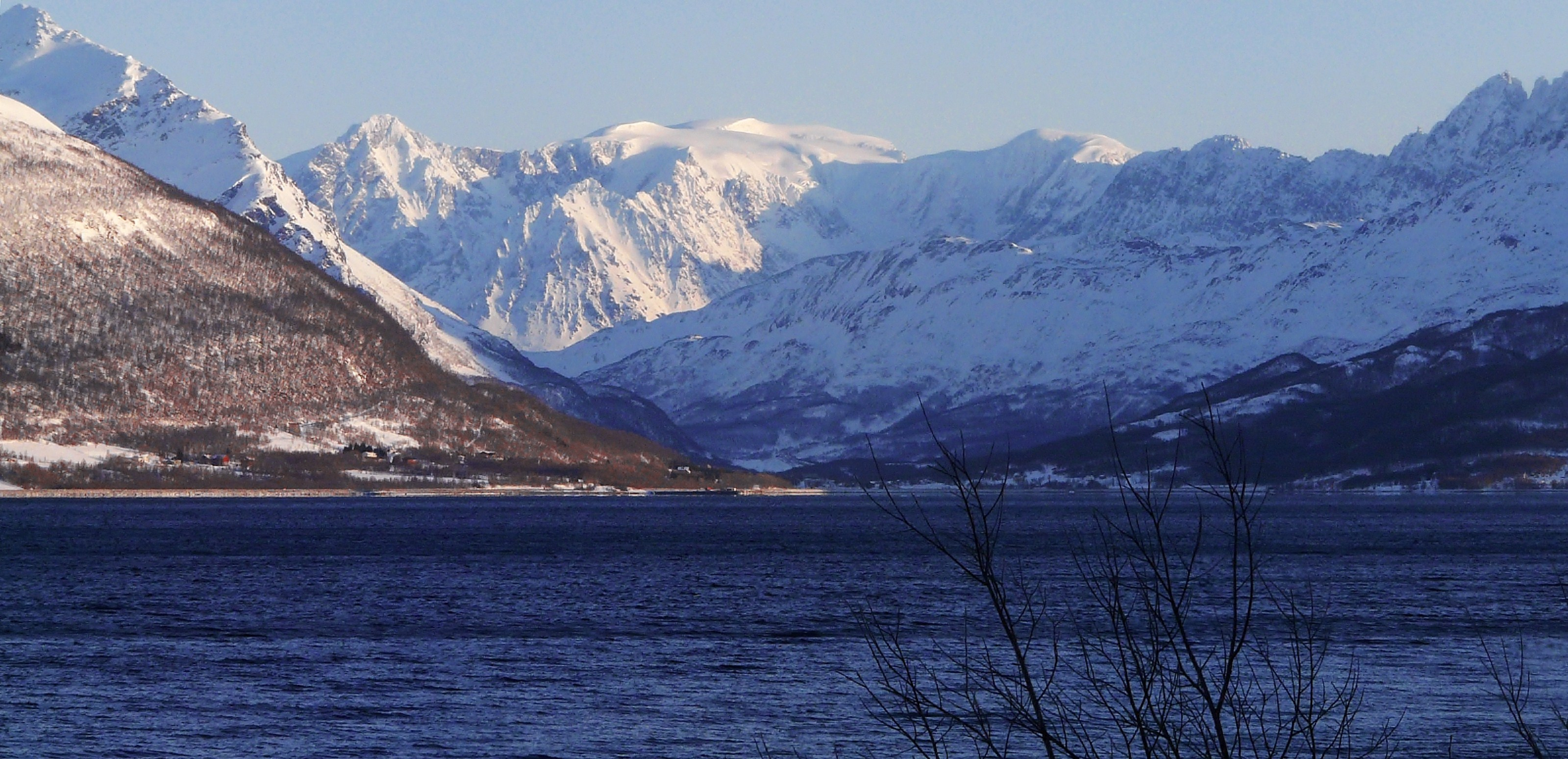
- Jiekkevarre with its glacier towering over the ice-free Balsfjord. February 2009.

Highest point
- Elevation: 1,834 m (6,017 ft)
- Prominence: 1,741 m (5,712 ft); 2nd in Norway
- Isolation: 157 to 159 km (98 to 99 mi)
- Listing: Ultra
- Coordinates: 69.4693°N 19.8776°E

Geography
- Location of the mountain
- Location: Troms, Norway
- Parent range: Lyngen Alps
- Topo map: 1633 IV Storfjord

Climbing
- First ascent: 1899
- Easiest route: Skiing

Jiehkkevárri (alternative spellings: Jiekkevarri, Jiekkevarre, or Jæggevarre) is a mountain on the border of Lyngen Municipality and Tromsø Municipality in Troms county, Norway. It is the highest mountain in Troms and has the second highest prominence (primary factor) among Norwegian mountains. The 1,834-metre (6,017 ft) tall mountain sits about 10 kilometres (6.2 mi) northeast of the village of Lakselvbukt and about 17 kilometres (11 mi) southwest of the village of Lyngseidet.

The first people known to have climbed it were Geoffrey Hastings (British) and Elias Hogrenning (Norwegian) in 1899. Its summit is ice-capped and any ascent involves a crossing of crevassed glaciers. Therefore, climbing it needs guiding by experienced mountaineers.

In winter, an experienced ski-mountaineer can traverse Jiehkkevárri in one long day, descending almost from the top via the steep, northeast facing couloir, described by the late Andreas Fransson as "a future classic for the new generation of mountain skiers". The descent route is exposed to serac fall from above, and is generally not recommended for ascending.

== Name ==
The name is a compound of the Sami language words jiehkki which means "glacier" and várri which means "mountain".

== See also ==
- List of highest points of Norwegian counties
- List of European ultra prominent peaks
