= Nordlandshest/Lyngshest =

Breed of horse

Nordlandshest
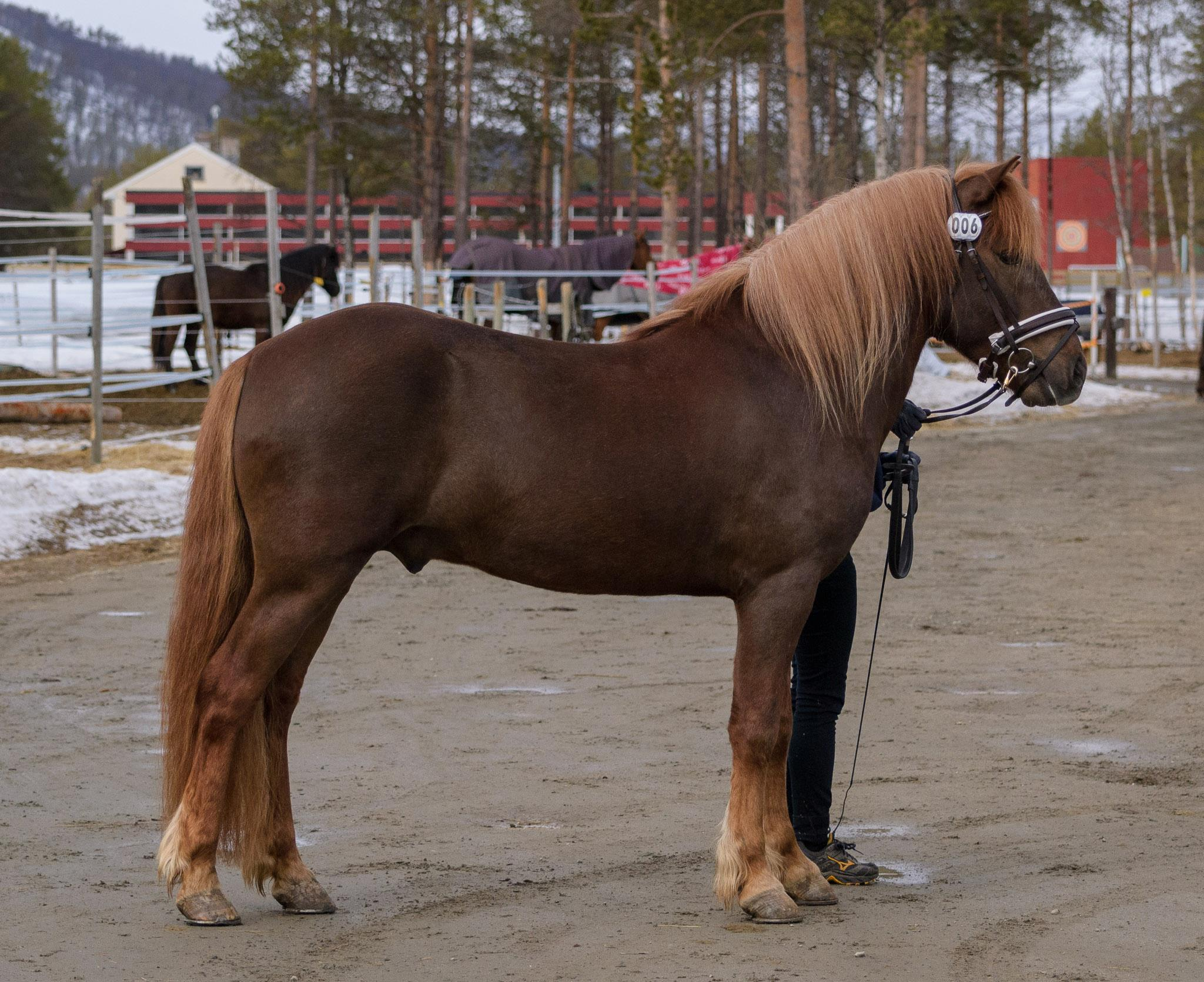
- Other names: Lyngshest, Northlands pony
- Country of origin: Norway

The Nordlandshest/Lyngshest also known as the "Nordland/Lyngen horse", "nordland horse" or "Lyngen horse", is a horse breed originating in Norway. It is the smallest of the three Norwegian national horse breeds. It originated in the area surrounding the Lyngen fjord in what is now Lyngen Municipality. The horse was given the name Nordlandshest in 1968 by breeders in that area. The name change was hotly disputed by breeders in Lyngen and surrounding areas, but a compromise was later reached, and today the official name of the breed is both Nordlandshest and Lyngshest.

== Breed characteristics ==
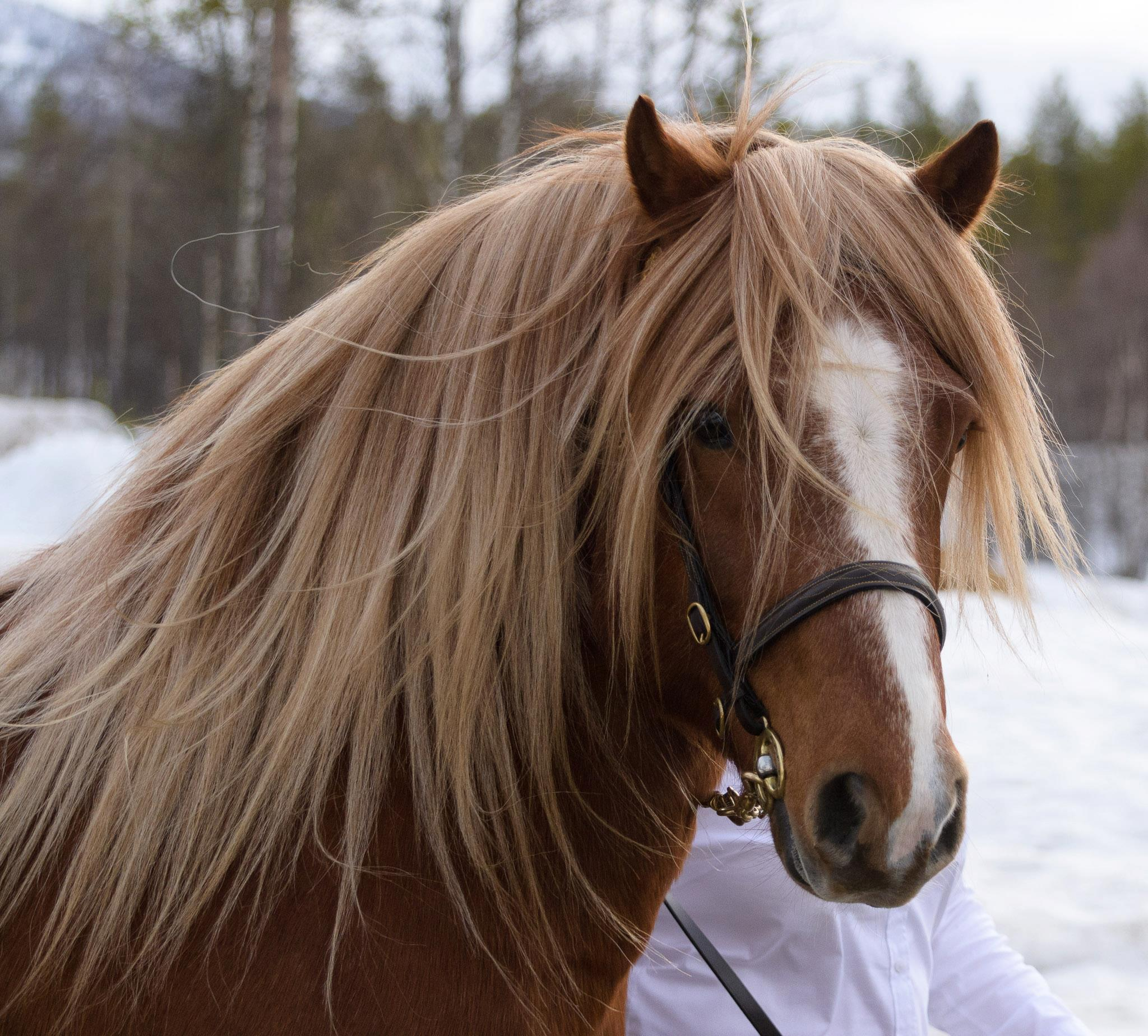

The Nordlandshest/Lyngshest is a small and sturdy horse with drive and eagerness to work. It is surefooted and very strong relative to its size. It typically has a little feather on its legs and grows a heavy winter coat. Its height at withers varies between 12.1 and 14.1 hands (49 and 57 inches, 124 and 145 cm), with most horses falling between 12.3 to 13.3 hands (51 to 55 inches, 130 to 140 cm). For stallions offered for the studbook, reaching that height at three years old is desirable but not necessary.

The Nordlandshest/Lyngshest should have balanced conformation and a strong, long build, with vitality and good temperament. The head should be dry and in proportion to the body and neck. The neck tends to be unrefined in conformation, but should be well set, and not be ewe-necked or too thick at the throatlatch. The back and especially the loin should be well-muscled. The croup and thigh should have good angles and be well-muscled. The croup may be somewhat sloping. The forequarters of the horse should be well-muscled with a wide and deep chest. Legs should be dry and set correctly with short, flat bone. Strong, hardy legs and good quality hooves are typical for the breed.

The gaits should be smooth, correct, and agile with good overreach. Emphasis is placed on good hock action in all gaits. The trot should be energetic and ground-covering with good suspension. The gallop should be light with good rhythm.

Of coat colours, the breed standard allows the following: chestnut, bay, black, palomino, buckskin, silver dappled bay, silver dappled black, silver dappled buckskin, and gray. Retaining diversity of coat colour is desirable. BEC/Blue-eyed cream individuals may not be accepted in the studbook. Star and blaze are common markings, but blazes extending to the eye area, bald faces, and stockings reaching or exceeding 1/3 of the cannon on hind legs are discouraged. Blue eyes, white markings on the body, and "white reaching the skin of the forelegs" (Note: This is the closest translation into English from the Norwegian source, og alle avtegn på hud over hoven på frambein) are disqualifying faults.

== Breed history ==
The first documentation of the Nordlandshest/Lyngshest dates to 1898, in the village of Lyngseidet in Troms county. Organised breeding began in the 1930s, when most of the breed population lived in the northern counties of Norway. The breeding was set back harshly by World War II, and the breed remained endangered into the 1960s. In the 2000s, the breed was no longer in acute danger of extinction, but its breeding program was challenged by limited genetic material and a desire to avoid outcrosses.

There were only about 15-20, mostly older mares, and only one stallion - Rimfakse, from whom all Nordlandshest/Lyngshest today descend. The breed was saved due to the efforts of people like Christian Klefstad who laboured intensely to bring the breed back, traveling all over northern Norway to gather fertile horses for breeding. By 2005, approximately 3000 horses were in the national registry, and about 200 foals were being born every year. As of 2013, approximately 2500 individuals are reported to be registered, with annual births of approximately 200. Numbers are dwindling, and the breed is still endangered.

== Uses ==
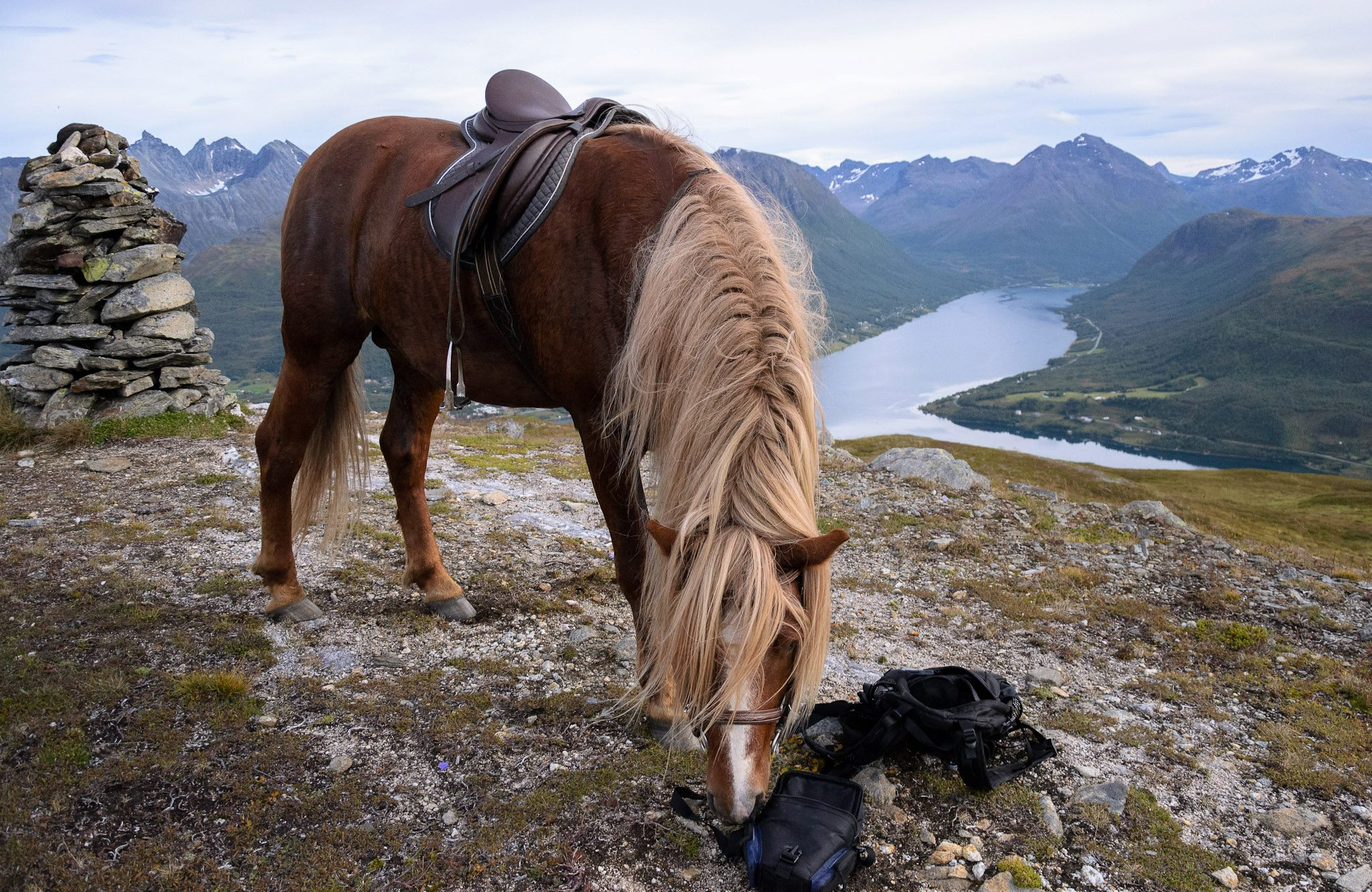

Throughout its history, the Nordlandshest/Lyngshest has been versatile, with uses that include farm work and horse transport. Nowadays it is popular as a family pet due to its relative great strength, and its suitability for both riding and driving. Thanks to its strength and endurance, the breed is suitable for trail riding and serving as packhorse. Its smooth gaits make it well-suited for therapy riding. It is also used for junior harness racing, dressage, and jumping, owing to a natural boldness and well-developed competitive instinct combined with a willing and cooperative nature.

== See also ==
- Nordland, a county in Norway
- Lyngen Municipality, a municipality in Troms county, Norway
