= Njunis =

Mountain in Troms, Norway

- Interactive map of the mountain

Highest point
- Elevation: 1,713 m (5,620 ft)
- Prominence: 1,305 m (4,281 ft)
- Isolation: 59.5 km (37.0 mi) to
- Listing: #13 in Norway
- Coordinates: 68.7494°N 19.4886°E

Geography
- Location: Troms, Norway
- Topo map(s): 1532 I Dividalen; 1532 II Altevatn

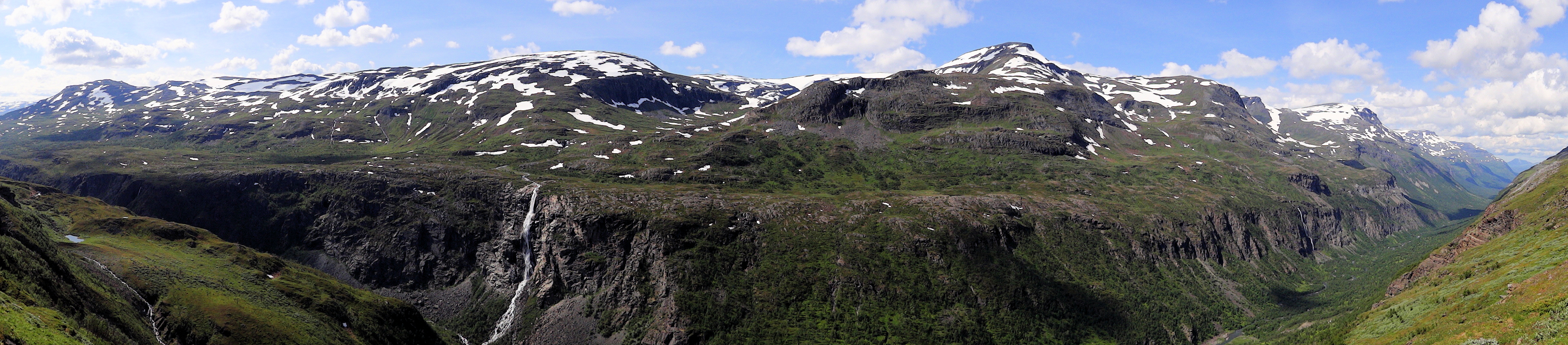
Peaks in the Rohkunborri National Park. In the front on the left side is Stággonjunni. In the back, left to right, Njunis (in Sweden, the rest in Norway), Jalgesvárri, Riehppecohkka, Middagsaksla, Spiikaloapmi, Sørgårdstinden, Melhuskletten and Storfjellet.

Njunis is a mountain in the interior of southern Troms county, Norway. The mountain lies in Målselv Municipality. With a peak at 1,713 metres (5,620 ft), it is the highest mountain in this part of the county, and has Norway's thirteenth largest prominence. The tree line (downy birch) reaches to 700 metres (2,300 ft) elevation on the southern slope of the mountain, the highest tree line in Troms. This forest is part of the Øvre Dividal National Park. At the peak, NATO has a radar centre.

== Name ==
The name njunis, which means "prominent nose of a mountain", is derived from the Northern Sami language.

== See also ==
- List of mountains in Norway by prominence
