= Lyngen Church =

- Lyngen kirke
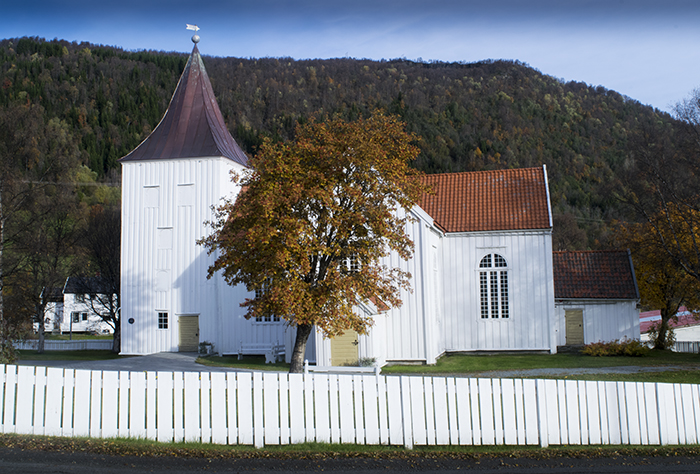
- View of the church
- Lyngen Church
- 69.575550°N 20.216774°E
- Location: Lyngen Municipality, Troms
- Country: Norway
- Denomination: Church of Norway
- Churchmanship: Evangelical Lutheran

History
- Status: Parish church
- Founded: 1731
- Consecrated: 1782

Architecture
- Functional status: Active
- Architectural type: Cruciform
- Completed: 1782 (244 years ago)

Specifications
- Capacity: 310
- Materials: Wood

Administration
- Diocese: Nord-Hålogaland
- Deanery: Nord-Troms prosti
- Parish: Lyngen
- Norwegian Cultural Heritage Site
- Type: Church
- Status: Listed
- ID: 84353

Lyngen Church (Norwegian: Lyngen kirke) is a parish church of the Church of Norway in Lyngen Municipality in Troms county, Norway. It is located in the village of Lyngseidet. It is the main church for the Lyngen parish which is part of the Nord-Troms prosti (deanery) in the Diocese of Nord-Hålogaland. The white, wooden church was built in a cruciform style with a steeple, sacristy, and porch. The building was constructed in 1782 by an unknown architect. The church seats about 310 people.

== History ==
The first church in Lyngen was built in 1731 in Karnes, about 1.5 kilometres (0.93 mi) south of the present location of the church. In 1740, it was decided that the church should be moved about 1.5 kilometres (0.93 mi) north to the larger village of Lyngseidet, so the church was disassembled, moved, and then rebuilt in the new location. There were three reasons for the move: It was easier for the priest from Karlsøy Church to get to Lyngseidet, the Sami people in Ullsfjord would have an easier way to the church, and there was lack of water and firewood at the old site in Karnes.

In 1782, the old church was torn down and a new church building was constructed on the same site. The new church cost about 230 Norwegian rigsdaler, and the materials from the old church were sold for 6 Norwegian rigsdaler.

In 1814, this church served as an election church (Norwegian: valgkirke). Together with more than 300 other parish churches across Norway, it was a polling station for elections to the 1814 Norwegian Constituent Assembly which wrote the Constitution of Norway. This was Norway's first national elections. Each church parish was a constituency that elected people called "electors" who later met together in each county to elect the representatives for the assembly that was to meet at Eidsvoll Manor later that year.

From 1840-1846, the church was extensively renovated. A German architect named Lydke came up with drawings for the extensive renovation. The old tower which stood in the middle of the church was demolished, and a new tower over a new entry porch was built, including an attic, bell tower, and spire was built in a Neo-Gothic style. The church building also received more seating by building a two-tier balcony over the main floor seating. The roof is made of red panels and the steeple is clad in copper. The exterior of the church is clad with vertical paneling.

During the World War II, the German army used the church as a stable. In 1951, a baptistery was built next to the church. The baptistery was to be a warm waiting room for children to be baptized. The baptistery has more recently been used as an office.

== See also ==
- List of churches in Nord-Hålogaland
