= Lyngen Alps =

Mountain range in Norway

- Lyngsalpan / Lyngsfjellan (Norwegian); Ittuvárit (Northern Sami); Yykeänvaarat (Kven)
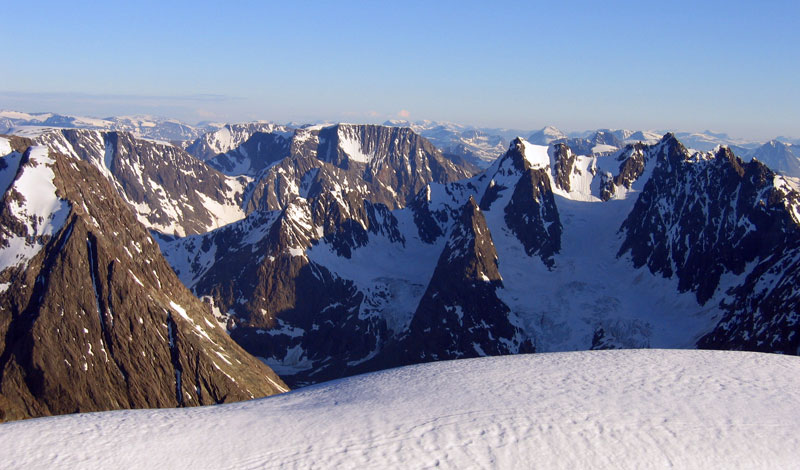
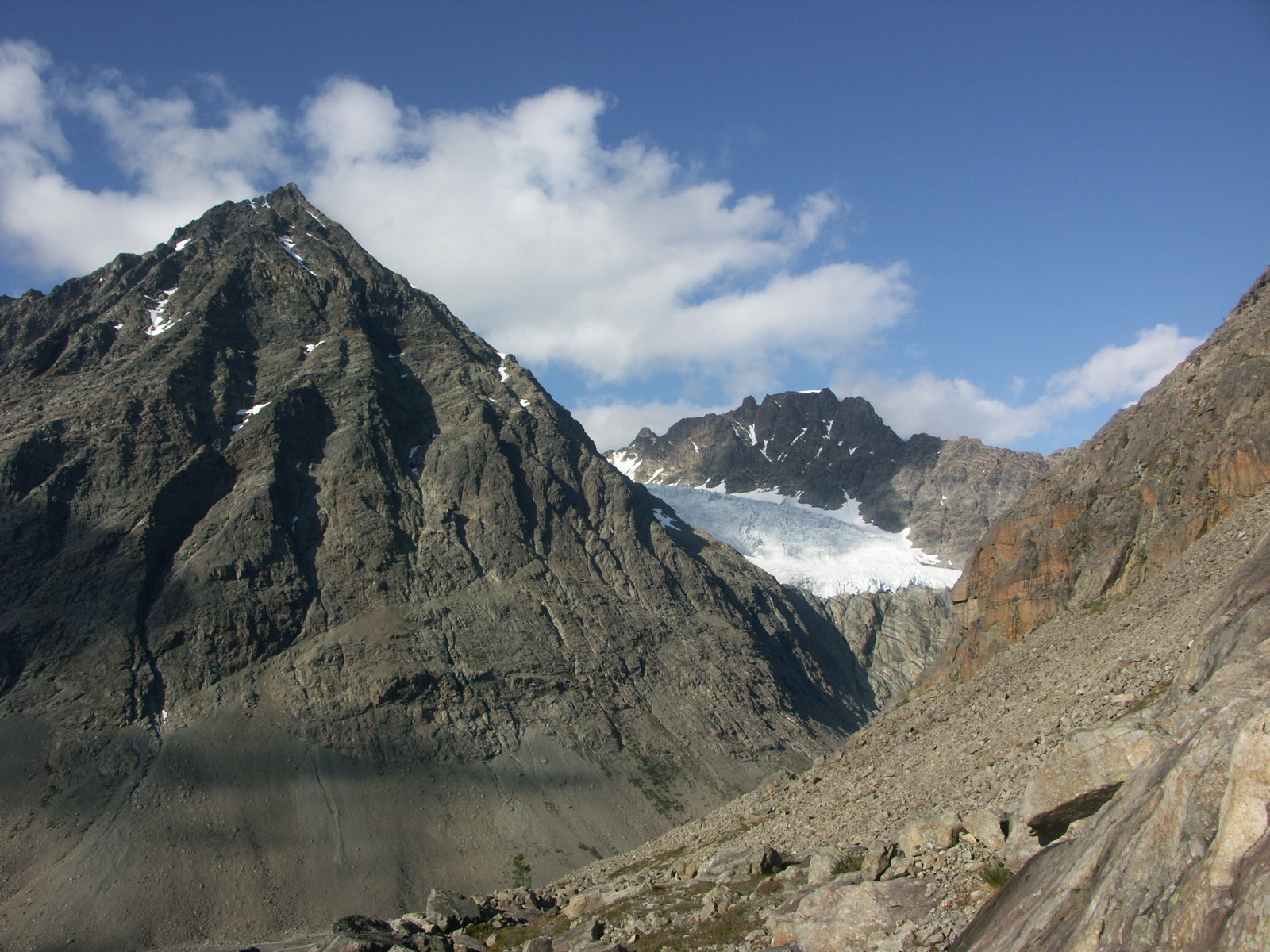
- View of Lyngen Alps Tvillingstinden and Tafeltinden − view from Skáidevárri

Highest point
- Peak: Jiehkkevárri, Tromsø/Lyngen border, Norway
- Elevation: 1,834 m (6,017 ft)
- Prominence: 1,741 m (5,712 ft)
- Coordinates: 69°29′09″N 19°52′36″E

Dimensions
- Length: 90 km (56 mi) North-South
- Width: 15 km (9.3 mi) East-West

Naming
- Native name: Lyngsalpene (Norwegian)

Geography
- Location of the mountain range
- Country: Norway
- County: Troms
- Municipalities: Balsfjord, Tromsø, Lyngen and Storfjord
- Range coordinates: 69°47′25″N 20°10′10″E

The Lyngen Alps (Norwegian: Lyngsalpan or Lyngsfjellan, Northern Sami: Ittuvárit, Kven: Yykeänvaarat) are a mountain range in northeastern Troms county in Norway, east of the city of Tromsø. The mountain range is located on the Lyngen Peninsula and it runs through Lyngen Municipality, Balsfjord Municipality, Storfjord Municipality, and Tromsø Municipality. The mountains follow the western shore of the Lyngen fjord in a north–south direction. The length of the range is at least 90 kilometres (56 mi) (depending on definition—there are mountains all the way south to the border with Sweden) and the width is 15–20 kilometres (9.3–12.4 mi). The mountains dominate the Lyngen Peninsula, which is bordered by the Lyngen fjord to the east, and the Ullsfjorden to the west.

There are 140 glaciers in the mountains covering about 141 square kilometres (54 sq mi) of the Lyngen Peninsula at present. Gamvikblåisen and Strupenbreen are the two largest in the outer part of the peninsula, while in the interior Fornesbreen and the Jiehkkevárri glacial complex are the largest. The bedrock consists of a belt of ophiolitic gabbro that is flanked on both sides by predominantly schistose metasediments. The gabbro belt underlies the rugged mountains of Lyngsalpene. In the lowland areas between Oteren and Koppangen, amphibolites, greenstones, and greenshales predominate. In the lowlands on the eastern side of the Lyngen peninsula, mica schists, phyllites, and dolomites are mainly found. The lowlands on the western side are mainly composed of mica schists and a small amount of quartzites. Except for ice caps at the summits of Jiehkkevárri and Bálggesvárri, cirque glaciers dominate the present glaciation on the Lyngen Peninsula. The Lyngen Alps are sufficiently high as to give rain shadow in the interior lowland areas east of the mountains. The northward heat advection of air and water masses into the Norwegian Sea region produces some of the largest temperature anomalies in the world, with a mean January air temperature about 24 °C warmer in Tromsø than the latitudinal mean.

The Lyngen Alps Landscape Reserve (Norwegian: Lyngsalpan landskapsvernområde) was established by the King of Norway on 20 February 2004 to protect one of Norway's characteristic mountain areas, which includes glaciers, moraines, valleys, and geological deposits, with biodiversity, cultural monuments, and cultural influences that characterize the landscape. The protection of natural resources within the landscape reserve is also important for the Saami culture and economy, and the site must be suitable for reindeer herding. Haakon, Crown Prince of Norway took part in the opening of the landscape reserve on May 22, 2004. The area of the Lyngen Alps landscape reserve is 961.2 square kilometres (371.1 sq mi). The nature reserve extends over four municipalities in Troms county.

There is a public transport connection between Tromsø and Lyngen via express boat to Nord-Lenangen and several bus routes. There are also ferries connecting Svensby and Breivikeidet, as well as the villages of Olderdalen and Lyngseidet. One of the main tourist attractions of Lyngen Alps is the glacier-fed lake Blåvatnet with a distinct turquoise color, located in Strupskardet valley.

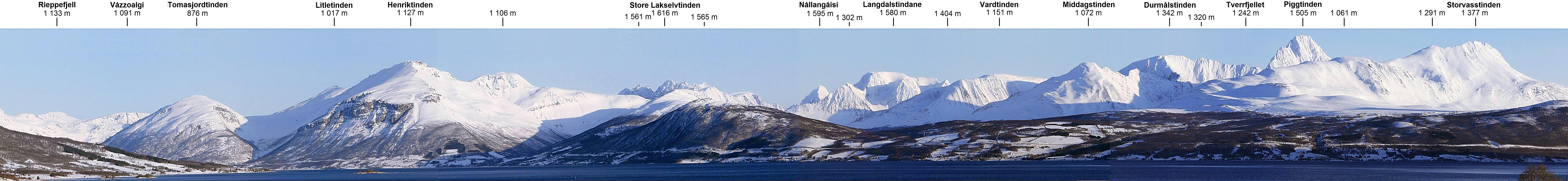
Panorama view of the Lyngen Alps over the Balsfjorden as seen from Storsteinnes in 2009 February.

== Blåvatnet ==
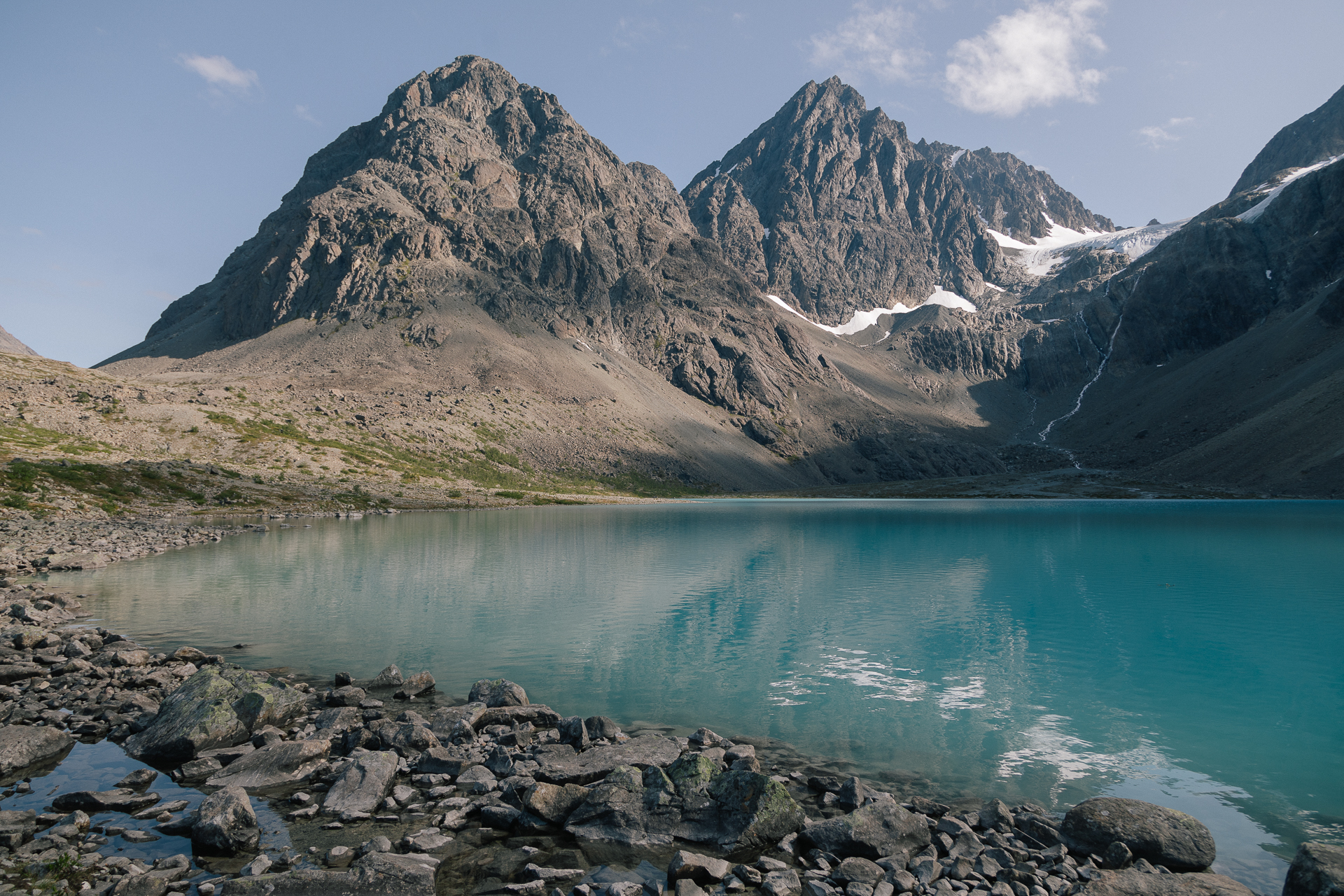
Lake Blåvatnet

The proglacial lake Blåvatnet is located in the northern part of the Lyngen Peninsula in Strupskardet valley. The lake lies next to Nordre Jægervasstinden and Lenangstinden mountains and below the Eastern and Western Lenangsbreene glaciers. Strupskardelva river flows in Strupskardet valley towards the west via a chain of six glacial lakes including Blåvatnet, providing additional meltwater source to the lake. The lake Blåvatnet is surrounded to the North by two marginal latero-frontal push moraines, formed by advancing glaciers during the Younger Dryas 12,800–11,500 years before present and to the East by three moraines formed during the early Holocene 8,900–10,400 years before present. They consist of large angular boulders with diameters of 1–5 m. These moraines were formed by ice from the east and west Lenensbreen glaciers, with areas of 1.4 km^{2} and 0.7 km^{2} respectively. The Lenangsbreene glaciers reached the modern-day shoreline located around 4 km below the Blåvatnet around 20,000 years before present. The modern-day area of Lenangsbreene glaciers is 1.9 km^{2}, while during the Lateglacial period 18,000–20,000 years before present was 9.1 km^{2}, and the sea-level was 87 m higher than nowadays. During 3,800–8,800 years before present the Lenangsbreene glaciers were completely melted away. Blåvatnet is capturing upstream sediments for the glacier-meltwater streams.

Glaciofluvial outwash is forming a prograding delta at the head of the lake and provides suspended sediment which refracts light as an intense turquoise color, giving Blåvatnet (the Blue Lake) its name. Clear water in non-glacial lakes absorbs longer wavelengths of visible light and strongly reflects shorter blue and blue-green wavelengths, therefore, it appears blue due to Rayleigh scattering. The glacial flour in glacial waters provides stronger light reflection and makes the water opaque and bright. The glacial flour composition includes clay which is approximately 2-4 microns in diameter and silt which is around 4-65 microns in diameter. The composition of glacial flour absorbs most of the blue light and reflects some blue and green. With the elimination of the colors absorbed by both the glacial flour and the water itself, what is left is mostly green and some blue light reflected back off the glacial flour.

== Alpinism ==
The mountains are of alpine character, popular among extreme skiers. The highest summit is the 1,833-metre (6,014 ft) tall Jiehkkevárri, the highest mountain in Troms county; Store Lenangstind is also a prominent mountain. The British climber William Cecil Slingsby was the first to climb many of the peaks. Slingsby was very impressed with the peak of Jiehkkevárri, calling it the Scandinavian region's answer to Mount Blanc. Mrs Aubrey Le Blond (Mrs Lizzie Main) also climbed in Lyngen and her climbs in arctic Norway are recorded in her book 'Mountaineering in the land of the midnight sun'. Piggtinden involved the Norwegian philosopher Peter Wessel Zapffe in mountaineering but the peak was first climbed in the summer of 1920 by Henning Tønsberg and Karl Rubenson, when Zapffe himself climbed this mountain only in 1923, while the first winter ascent was made in 1971.

== Geology and glaciology ==
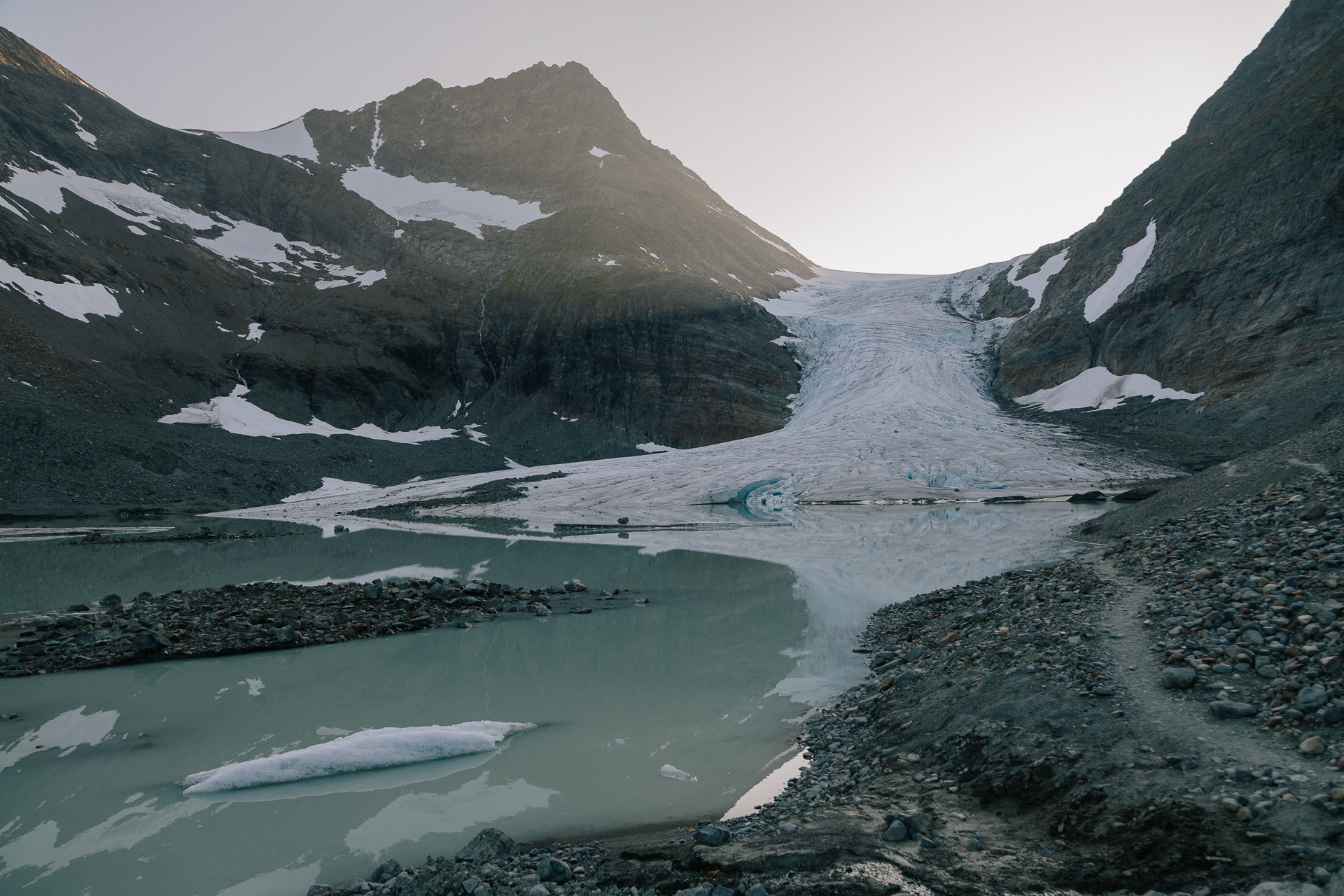
Steindalsbreen glacier, July 2023

Most of the Lyngen peninsula is a pronounced mountainous area with high mountains and alpine landscapes in a wide strip along the axis of the peninsula and with lower landscape areas along the fjords on both sides of the peninsula. The Alpine central part of Lyngen is made up of gabbro and other hard rocks that resist erosion and weathering well. Gabbro forms when molten magma becomes trapped beneath the Earth's surface and slowly cools into a crystalline mass. The lower parts of the peninsula are composed of several types of less stable rocks, mostly metamorphosed sedimentary rocks. The mountain range is dissected in several places by transverse deep mountain passes and valleys, with Kjosen, the 14-km long fjord arm of the Ullsfjorden, being the most prominent.

The Lyngen Peninsula is part of the Caledonian Orogeny. The Caledonian Orogeny, which stretches from Arctic Norway through Great Britain, Ireland, and parts of Greenland, was formed as a result of the collision of the ancient continents Laurentia and Baltica 380–430 million years ago. The mountains of this folding could originally be from eight to ten kilometers in height. The geology of northern Scandinavia is dominated by two bedrocks, the Precambrian basement, and the Caledonian mountain range. The Lyngen Peninsula is dominated by a 100 km slab of gabbro, lamellar diabase dikes, and other basic igneous rocks. These rocks belonged to the crust underlying part of the Iapetus Ocean during the Finnmark Orogeny and were thrust over bedrock deformed during earlier Finnmark tectonism. During the Caledonian orogeny, the Baltic subsided under Laurentia. The island arc, with its gabbro intrusions and ophiolite sequence, was sandwiched between the plates and then raised to the surface of the Baltica plate. The gabbro was raised above sea level and subjected to severe erosion. The Precambrian basement dominates the large islands west of Tromsø including Senja, Kvaløya, Ringvassøya, and Vanna, while the Tromsø and Lyngen igneous sheets dominate the area east of Tromsø.

Despite the long history of glaciation, the evidence of glaciation that we can observe today is only from the last ice age because, due to its length and intensity, it largely wiped out the results of previous ice ages. During the maximum ice thickness around 20,000 years ago, the Lyngen peninsula was probably covered by glaciers up to 1000–1200 m thick. During the period 9,000–13,000 years ago, the fjord and valley glaciers melted. Most of the loose rock on the Lyngen Peninsula is moraines and glacial material transported by the melting of the ice sheet. After the ice age, various glacial activities were observed in the mountainous regions, which affected the landscape to a lesser extent. Frosty weathering occurred on the steep lower walls and mountain slopes. The rivers in the valleys carried the loose masses to the sea, the waves eroded and sorted the sediments in the constantly sinking beach area, and clay was deposited on the seabed. The balance of the mass of glaciers and nearby areas ahead are climate archives that can tell about natural changes from the recent past and the current situation.

== Climate and fauna ==
In Lyngen there is a strong difference between the climate of the western and eastern parts of the peninsula. The highland area acts as a barrier and staunches most of the precipitation coming from the west so that most of it falls on the west side and makes the east side drier. This also affects the condition of the snow and the length of the winter season. The lowlands can be considered coastal with an average annual rainfall of about 600 mm at Lyngseydet and 850 mm at the Ulsfjord. The mountains receive much more precipitation. The average annual temperature is 3.0 °C. In January, the lowest average monthly temperature is -4.5 °C, while in July the highest is 12.5 °C.

The highest mountain regions of Lyngsalpan are species-poor, while the lower mountainous regions, valleys, and forest areas show a greater diversity of both birds and animals. In the highlands, the species diversity is limited, and in general, you can only meet rock ptarmigans, ravens, and snow buntings. At lower altitudes, there are more species including passerines, waders, anseriformes. Wild mammal species include hares, red foxes and least weasels. There are also wolverines, lynx, and moose. Squirrels and martens also live in the area. Minks and otters are found near lakes and streams. In addition to these species, there are a large number of small rodents.

== History ==
The area around Lyngen is located in the heart of the Cap of the North (Norwegian: Nordkalotten) on the border with Sweden and Finland. For centuries, Lyngen has been a meeting place for cultures, trade, religions, and conflicts between northern states. Historically, Lyngen was also a border area between the Russian and the Danish-Norwegian joint taxation area. After the conclusion of peace in 1326, Lyngen was placed as the western border of the taxable lands of the Novgorod Republic. Russia could collect taxes along the Norwegian coast as far as Lyngen. Lyngen was also a frontier region of great importance in recent history. During World War II, the Germans created a defensive line for protection against Soviet advance through Norway – the Lyngen Line (Norwegian: Lyngenlinjen) and during the cold war, Norway and NATO re-armed this defensive line again.

The Lyngen Peninsula has long been a reindeer grazing area. There are written sources that tell about the resettlement of the Swedish Sami in “Iddu-njarga”, on the Lyngen Peninsula in the 18th century. The Lapland Code of 1751 recognized the right of the Saami to use pastures across the state border, which was then formalized between Denmark/Norway and Finland/Sweden. In 1972, Norway terminated the reindeer herding agreement with Sweden.

The way of life of the Sea Sami in this area was based on a combination of several types of crafts that ensured survival. Women were primarily responsible for running the household. They took care of the children, looked after the barn, cooked, and did the housework. Men were mainly responsible for maintaining buildings and tools, fishing, hunting, firewood, mowing, and butchering livestock, and making tools and utensils. Many men went on seasonal fishing trips, while women took care of household chores.

The Kvens who crossed the border in the 18th and 19th centuries brought their customs and language with them. The Norwegians who came to Lyngen in the 17th century were merchants, Christian missionaries, and civil servants. Norwegian farmers and fishermen also lived near the resource-rich Lyngenfjord. The historical meeting of the Saami, Norwegians, and Kvens at Nordkalotten was called "the meeting of three tribes".

The mountains received official names in Northern Sámi and Kven in September 2024 from the Norwegian Mapping Authority: Ittuvárit and Yykeänvaarat.
