= Lyngenhalvøya =

Peninsula in northern Norway

Coordinates: 69°41′N 20°04′E

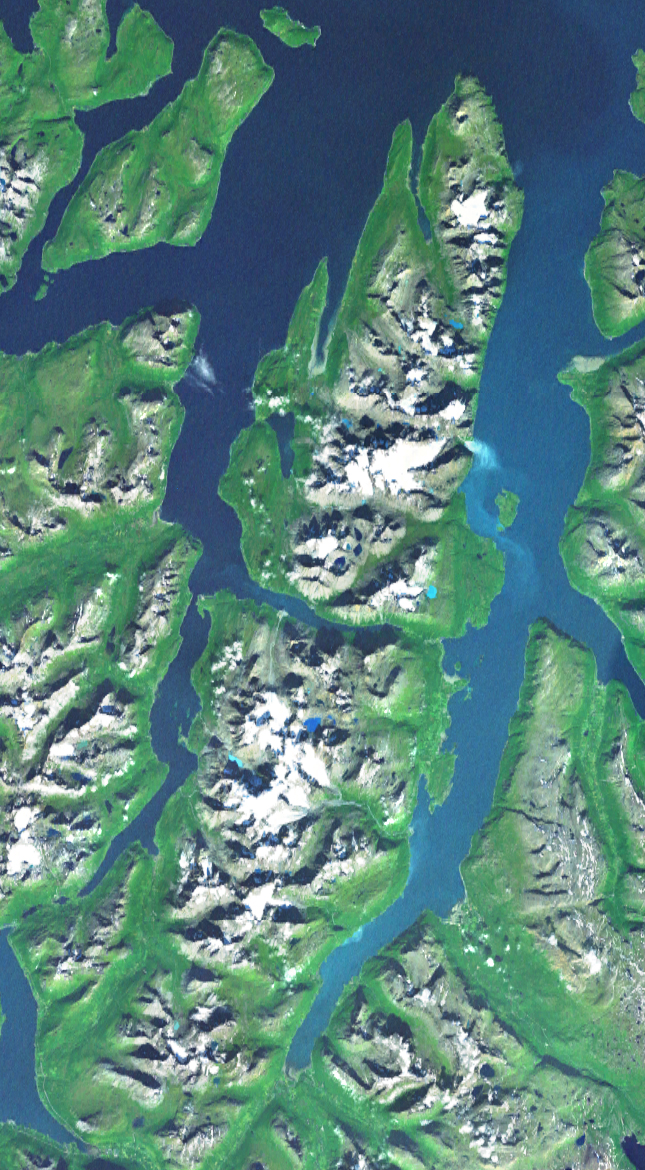
Satellite view of Lyngenhalvøya

Lyngenhalvøya (English: Lyngen Peninsula; Northern Sami: Ittunjárga) is a peninsula in Troms county, Norway. The peninsula is primarily located in Lyngen Municipality, but the southwestern portion is part of Tromsø Municipality and the southeastern part is part of Storfjord Municipality. The peninsula lies between the Ullsfjorden in the west and the Lyngen in the east. It has an area of around 1,500 square kilometres (580 sq mi). The peninsula is almost divided in the middle by the fjord arm Kjosen. In the south it is bounded by Balsfjord Municipality. Large parts of the peninsula are covered by the Lyngsalpan landscape conservation area.

The central parts of the peninsula consist of the Lyngen Alps, an alpine landscape with glaciers and high peaks along with narrow, rugged valleys. The highest mountain is Jiehkkevárri (1,834 metres (6,017 ft)), which is Troms county's highest mountain.
