= Ullsfjorden =

Fjord in Troms, Norway

Ullsfjorden (Norwegian); Moskavuotna (Northern Sami)
- Moskavuotna (Northern Sami)
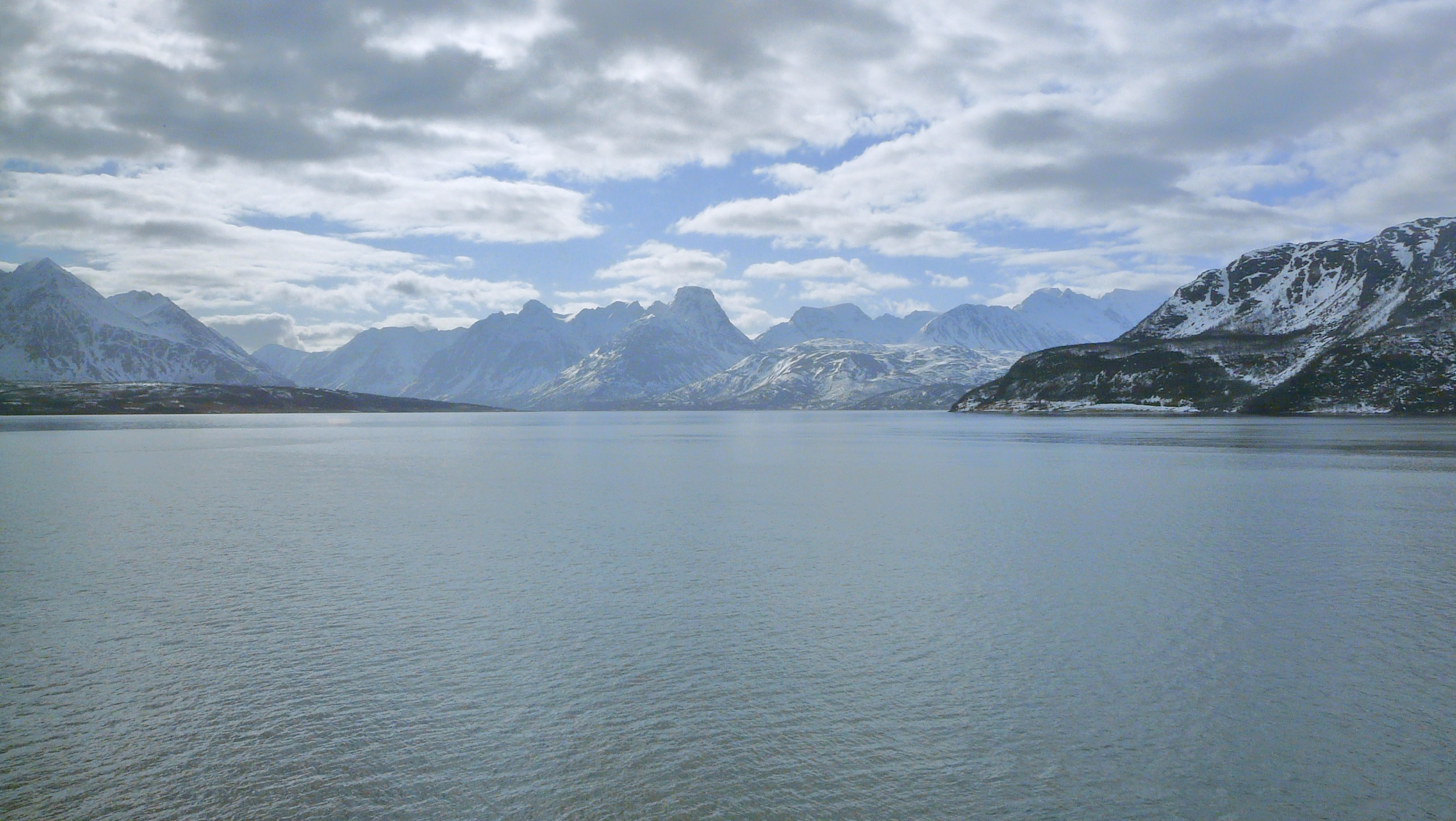
- View of the fjord
- Interactive map of the fjord
- Location: Troms county, Norway
- Coordinates: 69.7047°N 19.7206°E
- Type: Fjord
- Basin countries: Norway
- Max. length: 75 kilometres (47 mi)
- Max. width: 11 kilometres (6.8 mi)

Ullsfjorden (Norwegian) or Moskavuotna (Northern Sami) is a fjord in Troms county, Norway. The fjord runs through the municipalities of Tromsø, Karlsøy, and Lyngen. The 75-kilometre (47 mi) fjord flows from the village of Sjøvassbotn northwards along the west side of the Lyngen Peninsula (where the famous Lyngen Alps are located). The Kjosen fjord branches off to the east side and the Grøtsundet strait branches off to the west (which then flows into the Tromsøysundet). The islands of Reinøya and Karlsøya lie along the western side of the fjord. The southern part of the Ullsfjorden is also known as Sørfjorden. The area surrounding the Ullsfjorden was part of Ullsfjord Municipality for about 60 years during the 20th century.

== See also ==
- List of Norwegian fjords
