= Runo Isaksen =

Norwegian writer

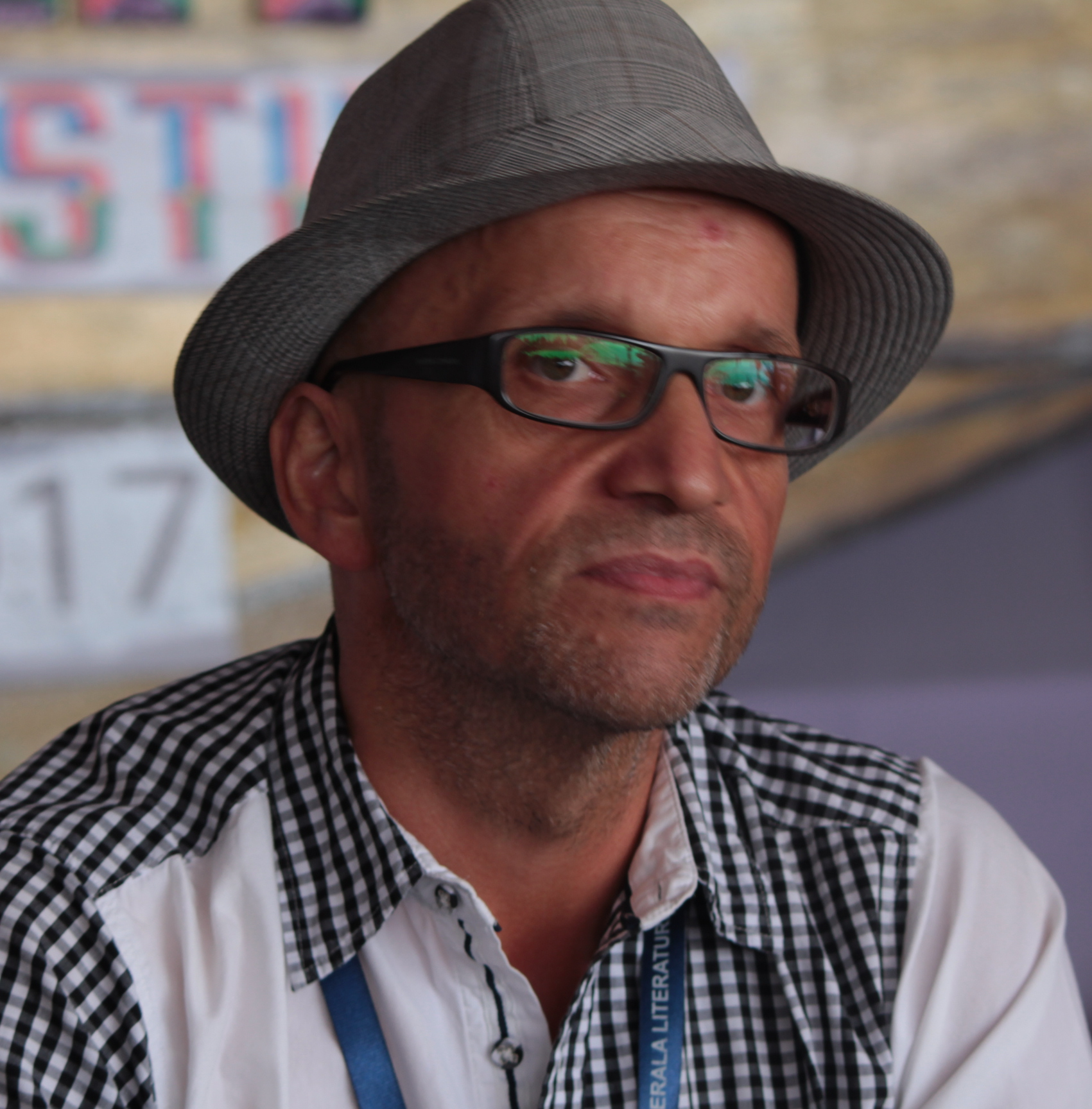
Runo Isaksen in Kerala Literature Festival, Kozhikode, Kerala, India (February, 2017)

Runo Isaksen (born 23 July 1968 in Lyngen Municipality) is a Norwegian writer. He works as a journalist at the University of Bergen.

== Bibliography ==
- Open book - novel (1997) ISBN 82-03-17883-9
- Ren - novel (1998) ISBN 82-03-18010-8
- Gloria - novel (2002) ISBN 82-03-18588-6
- Stylitten - (2004) ISBN 82-03-18866-4
- Literature in war - Nonfiction (2005) ISBN 82-02-22531-0
- A perfect day - novel (2009) ISBN 978-82-03-19546-4
- Someone has finally found me - novel (2013) ISBN 978-82-03-35485-4

== Pricing ==
- Aschehougs debutant Scholarship 1997 for Open book
