= Furuflaten =

Village in Lyngen Municipality, Norway

Furuflaten: Furuflaten (Norwegian); Vuošvággi (Northern Sami); Vuosvankka (Kven)
- Village
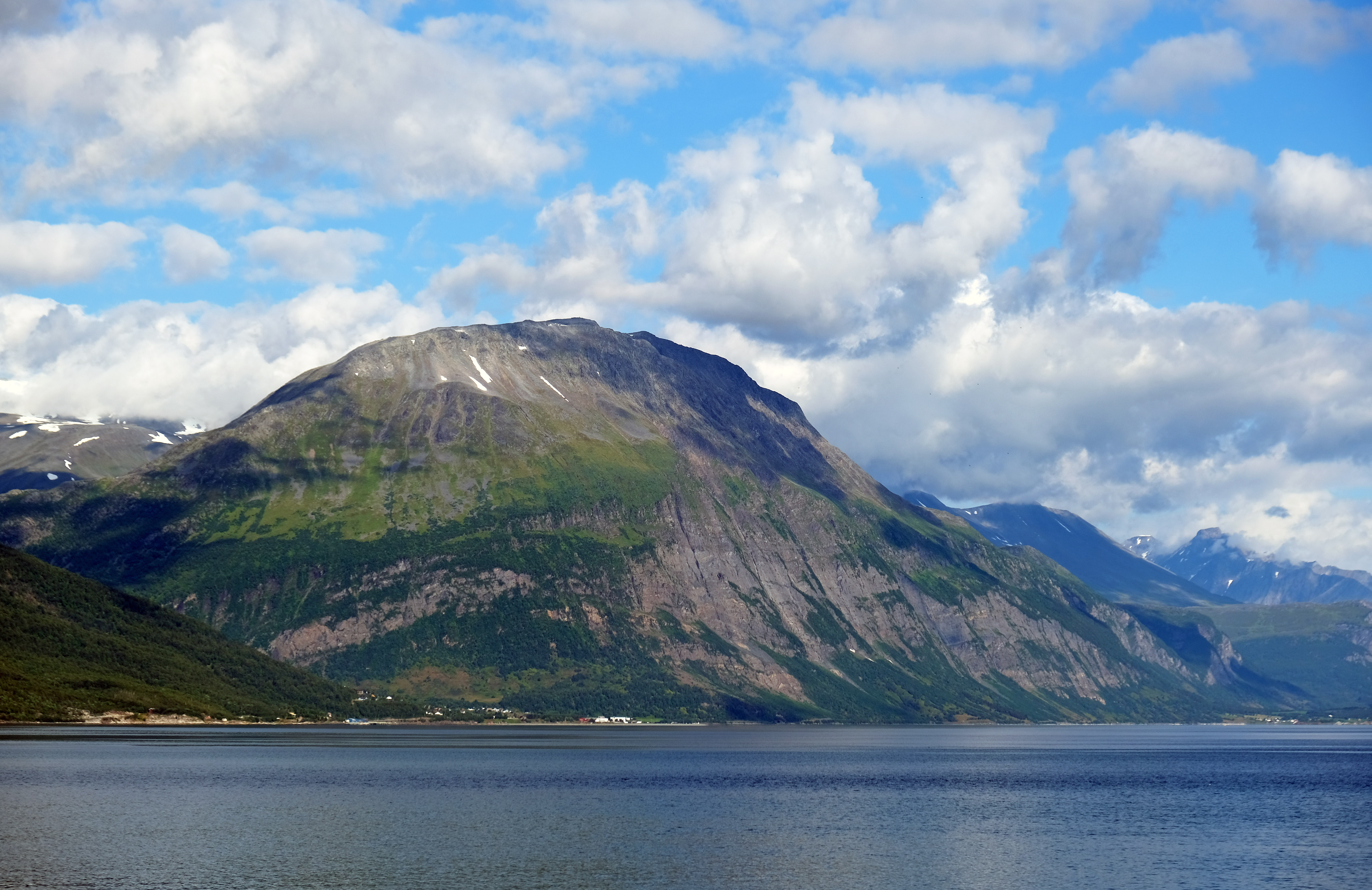
- Furuflaten seen from Skibotn
- Interactive map of Furuflaten
- Location within Troms Location within Norway
- Coordinates: 69.4414°N 20.1541°E
- Country: Norway
- Region: Northern Norway
- County: Troms
- District: Nord-Troms
- Municipality: Lyngen Municipality

Area
  - Total: 0.42 km^{2} (0.16 sq mi)
- Elevation: 6 m (20 ft)

Population (2023)
  - Total: 240
  - Density: 571/km^{2} (1,480/sq mi)
- Time zone: UTC+01:00 (CET)
  - Summer (DST): UTC+02:00 (CEST)
- Post Code: 9062 Furuflaten

Furuflaten (Norwegian), Vuošvággi (Northern Sami), or Vuosvankka (Kven) is a village in Lyngen Municipality in Troms county, Norway. The village is located along the Lyngen fjord. Furuflaten is located at the mouth of the Lyngsdalselva river, about 15 kilometres (9.3 mi) south of the village of Lyngseidet and about 54 kilometres (34 mi) straight southeast of the city of Tromsø.

The 0.42-square-kilometre (100-acre) village has a population (2023) of 240 and a population density of 571 inhabitants per square kilometre (1,480/sq mi).
