= Lyngen Municipality =

Municipality in Troms, Norway

Lyngen Municipality Lyngen kommune Ivggu suohkan (Northern Sami) Yykeän komuuni (Kven)
- Municipality
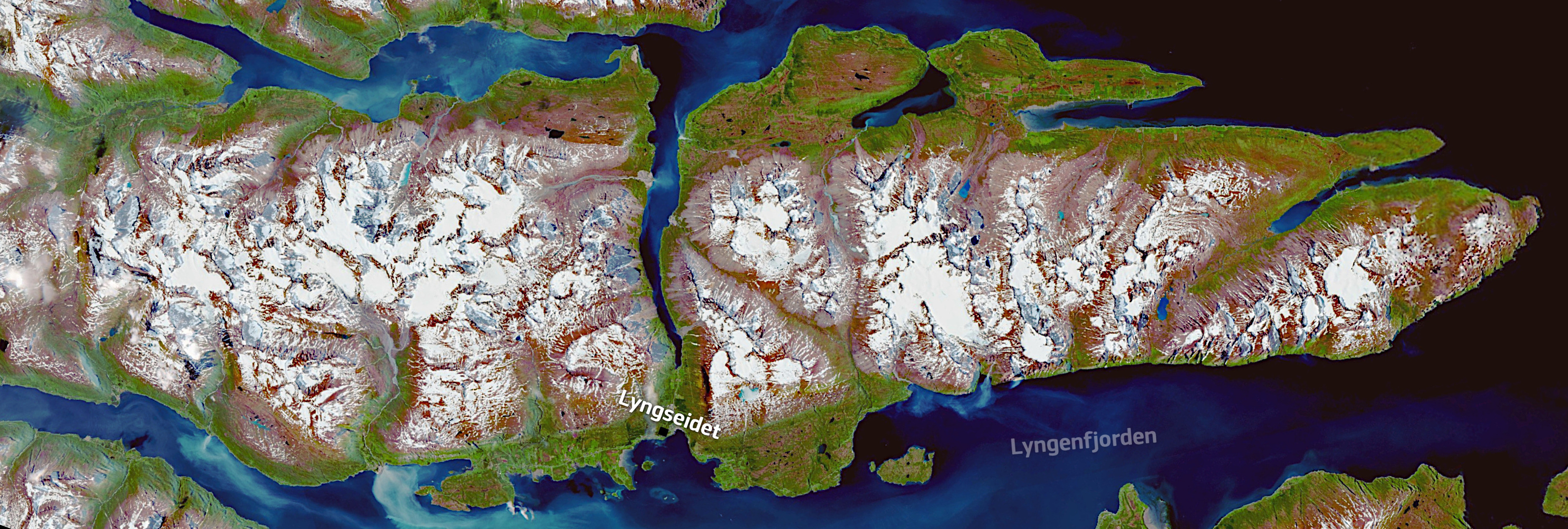
- The peninsula as seen by Sentinel-2

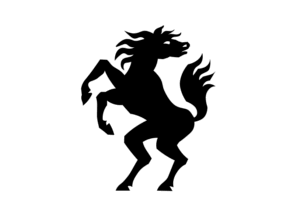
- Flag Coat of arms

- Troms within Norway

- Lyngen within Troms
- Coordinates: 69°41′25″N 20°04′54″E
- Country: Norway
- County: Troms
- District: Nord-Troms
- Established: 1 Jan 1838
  - Created as: Formannskapsdistrikt
- Administrative centre: Lyngseidet

Government
  - Mayor (2023): Eirik Larsen (Local list)

Area
  - Total: 812.70 km^{2} (313.79 sq mi)
  - Land: 795.12 km^{2} (307.00 sq mi)
  - Water: 17.58 km^{2} (6.79 sq mi) 2.2%
  - Rank: #141 in Norway
- Highest elevation: 1,834 m (6,017 ft)

Population (2024)
  - Total: 2,743
  - Rank: #242 in Norway
  - Density: 3.4/km^{2} (8.8/sq mi)
  - Change (10 years): ▼ −8.3%
- Demonym: Lyngsfjerding

Official language
  - Norwegian form: Neutral
- Time zone: UTC+01:00 (CET)
  - Summer (DST): UTC+02:00 (CEST)
- ISO 3166 code: NO-5536
- Website: Official website

Lyngen (Northern Sami: Ivgu; Kven: Yykeä) is a municipality in Troms county, Norway. The administrative centre of the municipality is the village of Lyngseidet. Other notable villages include Furuflaten, Lattervika, Nord-Lenangen, and Svensby.

The 813-square-kilometre (314 sq mi) municipality is the 141st largest by area out of the 357 municipalities in Norway. Lyngen is the 242nd most populous municipality in Norway with a population of 2,743. The municipality's population density is 3.4 inhabitants per square kilometre (8.8/sq mi) and its population has decreased by 8.3% over the previous 10-year period.

== General information ==
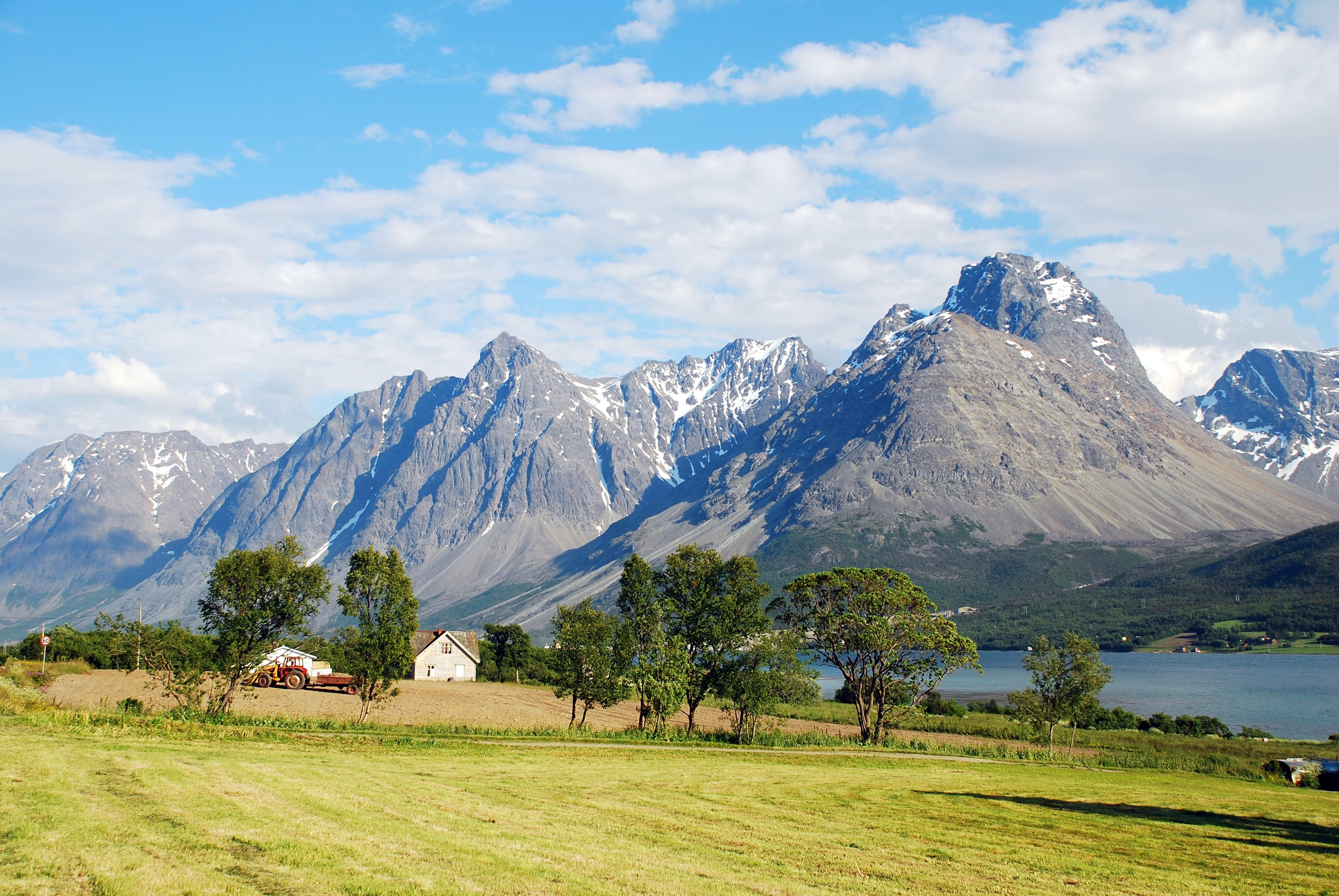
View of Bensnes

The parish of Lyngen was established as a municipality on 1 January 1838 (see formannskapsdistrikt law). On 1 January 1867, the southern mainland part of Karlsøy Municipality (population: 862) surrounding the Sørfjorden (innermost part of the Ullsfjorden) was transferred to Lyngen.

Then on 1 January 1875, a small part of Lyngen (population: 7) was transferred to the neighboring Balsfjord Municipality. On 1 January 1902, the Sørfjorden area (population: 1,139) was separated from Lyngen to form the new Sørfjord Municipality. This left Lyngen Municipality with 5,102 residents. On 21 June 1929, a royal resolution was issued that divided the large municipality of Lyngen into three parts. The northwestern part (population: 2,225) remained as Lyngen municipality. The northeastern part (population: 2,482) became the new Kåfjord Municipality. The southern part (population: 1,499) became the new Storfjord Municipality.

During the 1960s, there were many municipal mergers across Norway due to the work of the Schei Committee. On 1 January 1964, the northern part of the Lyngen peninsula that was part of Karlsøy Municipality (population: 1,001) and with the Svensby area of Ullsfjord Municipality (population: 171) was merged with Lyngen Municipality (population: 2,761) to form a new, larger Lyngen Municipality. Then on 1 January 1992, the part of Lyngen Municipality located on the eastern shore of the Lyngenfjorden was removed from Lyngen. The Nordnes village area (population: 38) in the northern part of this area was transferred to the neighboring Kåfjord Municipality, and the unpopulated southern part was transferred to the neighboring Storfjord Municipality.

On 1 January 2020, the municipality became part of the newly formed Troms og Finnmark county. Previously, it had been part of the old Troms county. On 1 January 2024, the Troms og Finnmark county was divided and the municipality once again became part of Troms county.

=== Name ===
The municipality (originally the parish) is named after local Lyngen fjord (Old Norse: Lygnir). The name derived from the word logn which means "quiet", "still", or "calm".

=== Coat of arms ===
The coat of arms was granted on 11 September 1987. The official blazon is "Argent, a horse forcene regardant sable" (Norwegian: I sølv en oppreist svart hest med hodet vendt bakover). This means the arms have a field (background) with a tincture of argent which means it is commonly colored white, but if it is made out of metal, then silver is used. The charge is a black horse (specifically, a local breed called Lyngshest). The horse is standing on its hind legs and its head is turned so it is looking backwards. The silver or white color in the field symbolizes the importance of the sea and fishing industry and the horse represents the local agriculture. The arms were designed by Arvid Sveen.

=== Churches ===
The Church of Norway has one parish (sokn) within Lyngen Municipality. It is part of the Nord-Troms prosti (deanery) in the Diocese of Nord-Hålogaland.

Churches in Lyngen Municipality
Parish (sokn)	Church name	Location of the church	Year built
Lyngen	Lyngen Church	Lyngseidet	1782
Lyngen	Lenangsøyra Chapel	Lyngmo	1996

== History ==
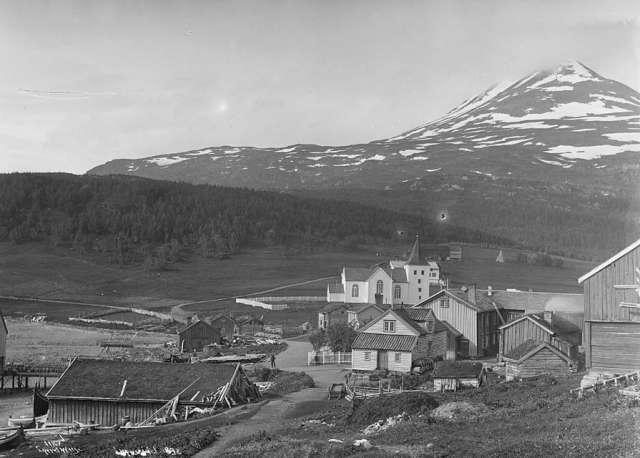
Lyngseidet as it looked around 1890

The Lyngen Church was built at Karnes in 1731, and was moved to its present location at Lyngseidet in 1740. In 1775, the church was rebuilt in its current cruciform shape, with the material from the old church used for a boathouse in Oldervik. Finally in 1840–1845, the church was renovated with a new tower, galleries, windows and panelling.

Other interesting buildings include the large wooden school in Solhov, which was built in 1924 to strengthen the Norwegian influence in this area which was largely populated by the Sami people and Kven people.

Lyngen has also lent its name to the Lyngen line, a defensive line at the pinch point between the Lyngen fjord and the mountains. The line was first established during the German occupation of Norway and the main purpose was to halt a Soviet invasion. During the Cold War the Norwegian Army continued to reinforce the Lyngen lined against a possible invasion from the east. However, there were always worries that the Soviets could also advance through Finland and the sparsely defended extreme north of Sweden (north of Kiruna, south of Treriksröset) and attack the Lyngen position from the rear via Signaldalen.

== Geography ==
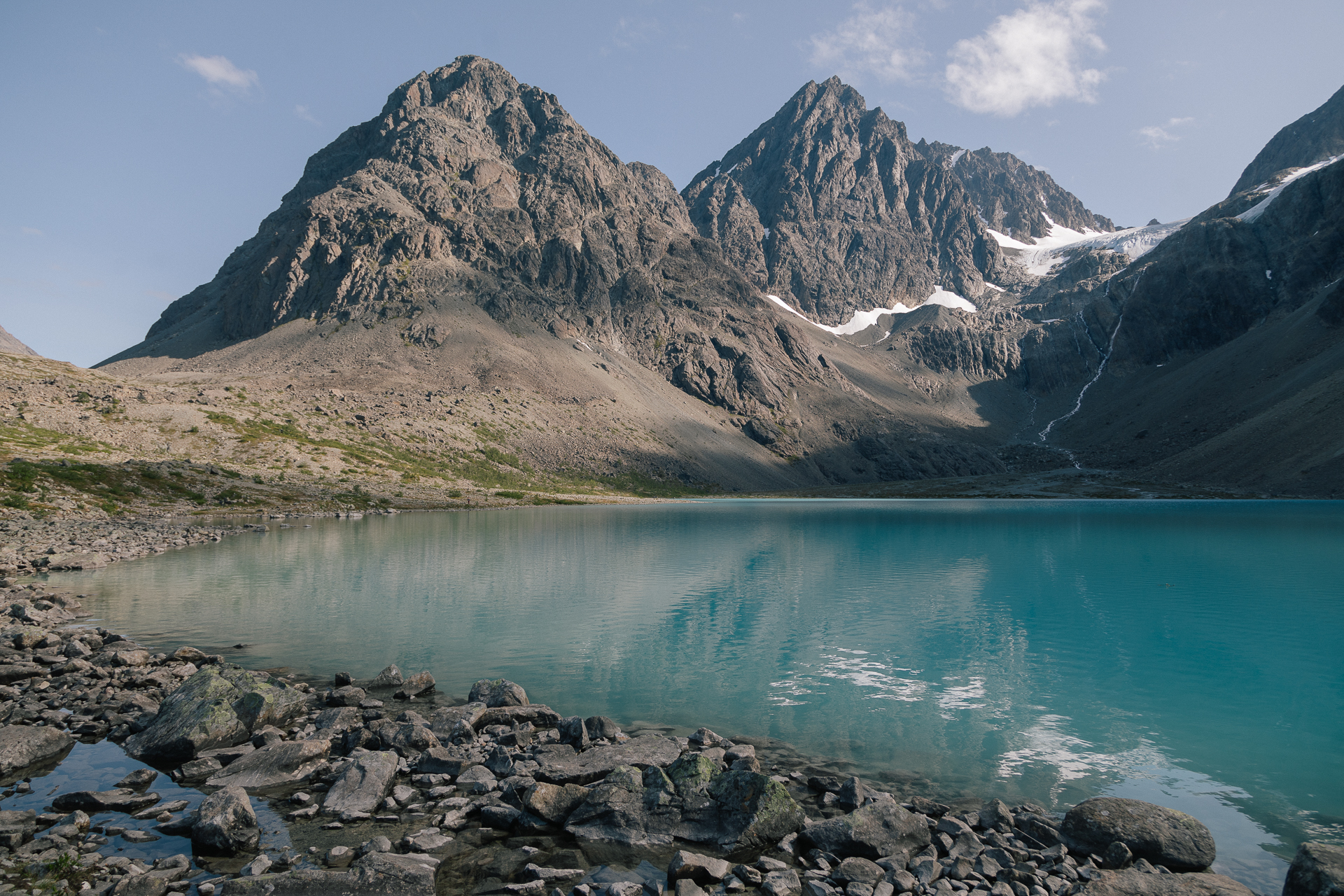
Lake Blåvatnet in Lyngen Alps

The municipality is situated on the Lyngen Peninsula, with the Lyngen fjord to the east and Ullsfjorden to the west. The municipal centre is the village of Lyngseidet, a pretty settlement on an isthmus that almost cuts the peninsula in the middle. Other villages include Furuflaten, which has various industries, and Svensby. Nord-Lenangen faces the open sea, and is largely a fishing village. The municipality has its own shipping company, operating the car ferries west to Breivikeidet in Tromsø Municipality and east to Olderdalen in Kåfjord Municipality where the European route E6 highway can be accessed. There is also a road going south along the shore of the fjord connecting to the main E6 road, giving ferry-free access to the main road network.

The Lyngen peninsula is a very scenic and mountainous area, known as the Lyngen Alps, with the highest peaks in Troms county. The highest peak in the municipality is Jiehkkevárri, reaching 1,834 metres (6,017 ft). Another prominent mountain is Store Lenangstind. The Strupbreen lies in this mountain range, northwest of Lyngseidet. The Lyngen Alps are used frequently by off-piste skiers from around the world.

=== Climate ===
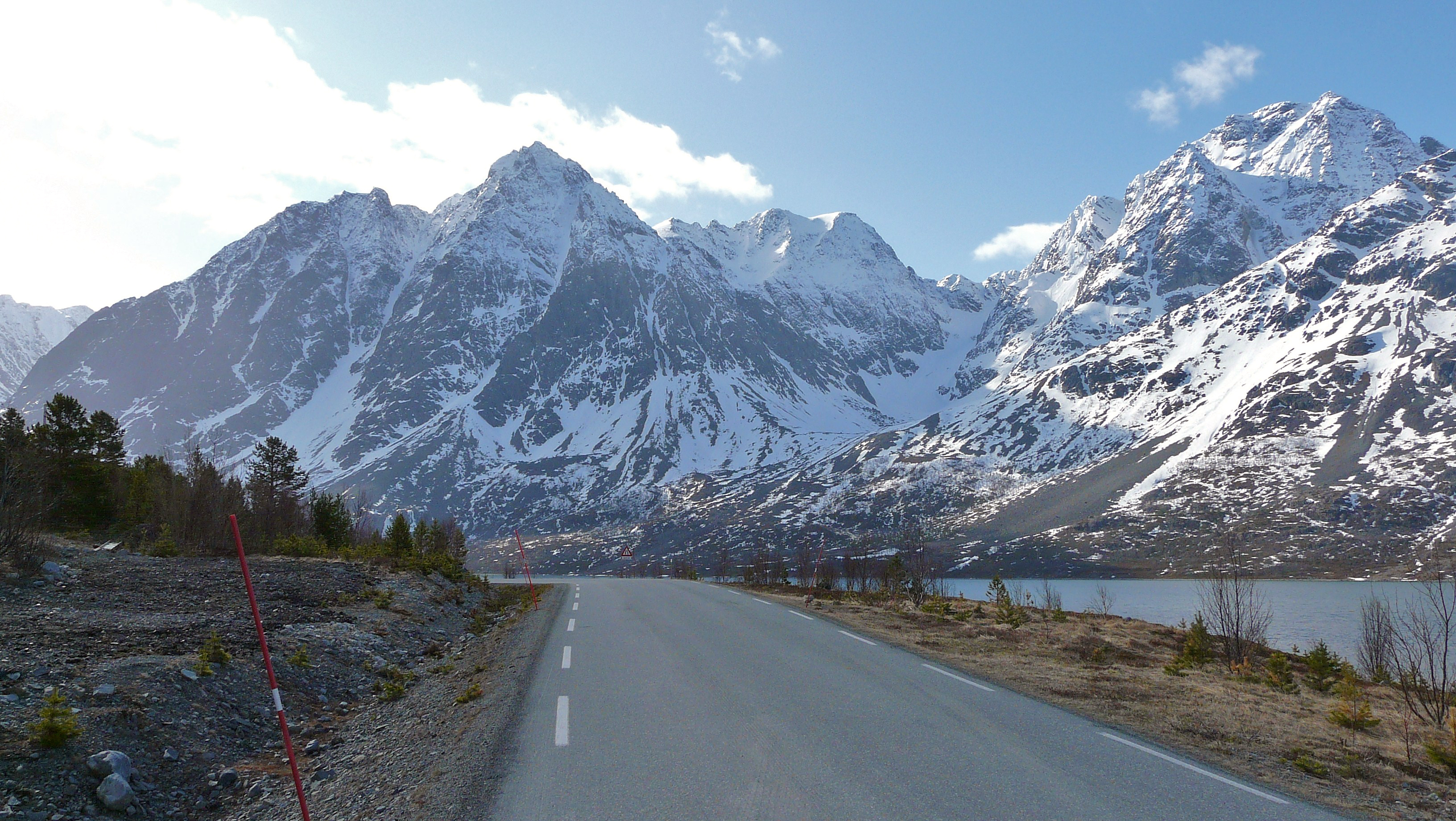
Rv 91 road in Lyngen, May 2009.

Winters in Lyngen are long and snow-rich, but not very cold considering the very northerly latitude. Average 24-hr temperatures are below freezing from November to early April, with a January average of −4.5 °C (24 °F). May is cool, with an average of 5.5 °C (42 °F); summer temperatures usually arrives in June. July is the warmest month with 24-hr average of 12.5 °C (55 °F); August's average is 11.6 °C (53 °F) and October's is 3.5 °C (38 °F). The average annual precipitation varies from 500 millimetres (19.7 in) in Lyngseidet (half that of Tromsø) to 950 millimetres (37.4 in) in the northern part of the peninsula (Nord-Lenangen).

Spring often sees much sunshine and is the driest season; average monthly precipitation is approximately 30 millimetres (1.2 in) from March to June, while October is the wettest month. In the mountains of the Lyngen Alps, the average temperatures typically remain below freezing from October to May, and snow accumulation can exceed 5 metres (16.4 ft)

== Government ==
Lyngen Municipality is responsible for primary education (through 10th grade), outpatient health services, senior citizen services, welfare and other social services, zoning, economic development, and municipal roads and utilities. The municipality is governed by a municipal council of directly elected representatives. The mayor is indirectly elected by a vote of the municipal council. The municipality is under the jurisdiction of the Nord-Troms og Senja District Court and the Hålogaland Court of Appeal.

=== Municipal council ===
The municipal council (Kommunestyre) of Lyngen Municipality is made up of 19 representatives that are elected to four year terms. The tables below show the current and historical composition of the council by political party.

Lyngen kommunestyre 2023–2027
Party name (in Norwegian)	Number of representatives
Labour Party (Arbeiderpartiet)	3
Progress Party (Fremskrittspartiet)	2
Conservative Party (Høyre)	3
Christian Democratic Party (Kristelig Folkeparti)	1
Pensioners' Party (Pensjonistpartiet)	1
Centre Party (Senterpartiet)	2
Liberal Party (Venstre)	1
People's List Lyngen (Folkelista Lyngen)	6
Total number of members:	19

Lyngen kommunestyre 2019–2023
Party name (in Norwegian)	Number of representatives
Labour Party (Arbeiderpartiet)	3
Progress Party (Fremskrittspartiet)	1
Green Party (Miljøpartiet De Grønne)	1
Conservative Party (Høyre)	3
Christian Democratic Party (Kristelig Folkeparti)	3
Centre Party (Senterpartiet)	2
Lyngen Cross-Party List (Lyngen Tverrpolitiske liste)	5
Together Lyngen (Samhold Lyngen)	1
Total number of members:	19

Lyngen kommunestyre 2015–2019
Party name (in Norwegian)	Number of representatives
Labour Party (Arbeiderpartiet)	5
Progress Party (Fremskrittspartiet)	1
Green Party (Miljøpartiet De Grønne)	1
Conservative Party (Høyre)	3
Christian Democratic Party (Kristelig Folkeparti)	2
Centre Party (Senterpartiet)	1
Lyngen Cross-Party List (Lyngen Tverrpolitiske liste)	4
Together Lyngen (Samhold Lyngen)	2
Total number of members:	19

Lyngen kommunestyre 2011–2015
Party name (in Norwegian)	Number of representatives
Labour Party (Arbeiderpartiet)	8
Progress Party (Fremskrittspartiet)	3
Conservative Party (Høyre)	3
Christian Democratic Party (Kristelig Folkeparti)	2
Centre Party (Senterpartiet)	2
List for the Russelv - Sør-Lenangsbotn area (Kretsliste for området Russelv - Sør-Lenangsbotn)	1
Total number of members:	19

Lyngen kommunestyre 2007–2011
Party name (in Norwegian)	Number of representatives
Labour Party (Arbeiderpartiet)	7
Progress Party (Fremskrittspartiet)	5
Conservative Party (Høyre)	1
Christian Democratic Party (Kristelig Folkeparti)	2
Coastal Party (Kystpartiet)	1
Centre Party (Senterpartiet)	2
Local list for the Russelv/Sør-Lenangsbotn area (Kretsliste for området Russelv/Sør-Lenangsbotn)	1
Total number of members:	19

Lyngen kommunestyre 2003–2007
Party name (in Norwegian)	Number of representatives
Labour Party (Arbeiderpartiet)	6
Progress Party (Fremskrittspartiet)	3
Conservative Party (Høyre)	2
Christian Democratic Party (Kristelig Folkeparti)	2
Centre Party (Senterpartiet)	2
Socialist Left Party (Sosialistisk Venstreparti)	2
Local list for the Russelv/Sør-Lenangsbotn area (Kretsliste for området Russelv/Sør-Lenangsbotn)	2
Total number of members:	19

Lyngen kommunestyre 1999–2003
Party name (in Norwegian)	Number of representatives
Labour Party (Arbeiderpartiet)	6
Progress Party (Fremskrittspartiet)	1
Conservative Party (Høyre)	2
Christian Democratic Party (Kristelig Folkeparti)	2
Centre Party (Senterpartiet)	2
Socialist Left Party (Sosialistisk Venstreparti)	2
Inner Lyngen Local List (Indre Lyngen Bygdeliste)	2
Local list for the Russelv/Sør-Lenangsbotn area (Kretsliste for området Russelv/Sør-Lenangsbotn)	2
Total number of members:	19

Lyngen kommunestyre 1995–1999
Party name (in Norwegian)	Number of representatives
Labour Party (Arbeiderpartiet)	11
Progress Party (Fremskrittspartiet)	1
Conservative Party (Høyre)	1
Christian Democratic Party (Kristelig Folkeparti)	2
Centre Party (Senterpartiet)	4
Socialist Left Party (Sosialistisk Venstreparti)	2
Inner Lyngen Local List (Indre Lyngen Bygdeliste)	5
Local list for the Russelv/Sør-Lenangsbotn area (Kretsliste for omr. Russelv/Sør-Lenangsbotn)	2
Common list for Sør-Lenangsbotn, Lanangsøyra and Jægervatn (Fellesliste for Sør-Lenangsbotn, Lenangsøyra og Jægervatn)	1
Total number of members:	29

Lyngen kommunestyre 1991–1995
Party name (in Norwegian)	Number of representatives
Labour Party (Arbeiderpartiet)	11
Progress Party (Fremskrittspartiet)	1
Conservative Party (Høyre)	1
Christian Democratic Party (Kristelig Folkeparti)	2
Socialist Left Party (Sosialistisk Venstreparti)	5
Inner Lyngen Local List (Indre Lyngen Bygdeliste)	5
Local list for the Russelv/Sør-Lenangsbotn area (Kretsliste for området Russelv/Sør-Lenangsbotn)	2
Common list for Sør-Lenangsbotn, Lanangsøyra and Jægervatn (Fellesliste for Sør-Lenangsbotn, Lenangsøyra og Jægervatn)	2
Total number of members:	29

Lyngen kommunestyre 1987–1991
Party name (in Norwegian)	Number of representatives
Labour Party (Arbeiderpartiet)	14
Conservative Party (Høyre)	3
Christian Democratic Party (Kristelig Folkeparti)	3
Socialist Left Party (Sosialistisk Venstreparti)	3
Liberal Party (Venstre)	1
Local list for the Russelv—Sør-Lenangsbotn area (Kretsliste for området Russelv—Sør-Lenangsbotn)	2
Lyngseidet and surroundings local list (Lyngseidet og omegn bygdeliste)	3
Total number of members:	29

Lyngen kommunestyre 1983–1987
Party name (in Norwegian)	Number of representatives
Labour Party (Arbeiderpartiet)	17
Conservative Party (Høyre)	3
Christian Democratic Party (Kristelig Folkeparti)	3
Centre Party (Senterpartiet)	1
Socialist Left Party (Sosialistisk Venstreparti)	2
Liberal Party (Venstre)	1
Local list for the Russelv—Sør-Lenangsbotn area (Kretsliste for området Russelv—Sør-Lenangsbotn)	2
Total number of members:	29

Lyngen kommunestyre 1979–1983
Party name (in Norwegian)	Number of representatives
Labour Party (Arbeiderpartiet)	13
Conservative Party (Høyre)	4
Christian Democratic Party (Kristelig Folkeparti)	4
Centre Party (Senterpartiet)	2
Socialist Left Party (Sosialistisk Venstreparti)	2
Local list for Outer Lyngen (Kretsliste for Ytre Lyngen)	4
Total number of members:	29

Lyngen kommunestyre 1975–1979
Party name (in Norwegian)	Number of representatives
Labour Party (Arbeiderpartiet)	15
Christian Democratic Party (Kristelig Folkeparti)	3
Centre Party (Senterpartiet)	4
Socialist Left Party (Sosialistisk Venstreparti)	2
Liberal Party (Venstre)	1
Independent common list (Uavhengig Samlingslist)	4
Total number of members:	29

Lyngen kommunestyre 1971–1975
Party name (in Norwegian)	Number of representatives
Labour Party (Arbeiderpartiet)	17
Centre Party (Senterpartiet)	5
Liberal Party (Venstre)	4
Local List(s) (Lokale lister)	3
Total number of members:	29

Lyngen kommunestyre 1967–1971
Party name (in Norwegian)	Number of representatives
Labour Party (Arbeiderpartiet)	19
Liberal Party (Venstre)	3
Local List(s) (Lokale lister)	7
Total number of members:	29

Lyngen kommunestyre 1963–1967
Party name (in Norwegian)	Number of representatives
Labour Party (Arbeiderpartiet)	15
Liberal Party (Venstre)	4
List of workers, fishermen, and small farmholders (Arbeidere, fiskere, småbrukere liste)	3
Local List(s) (Lokale lister)	7
Total number of members:	29

Lyngen herredsstyre 1959–1963
Party name (in Norwegian)	Number of representatives
Labour Party (Arbeiderpartiet)	11
Liberal Party (Venstre)	1
List of workers, fishermen, and small farmholders (Arbeidere, fiskere, småbrukere liste)	5
Local List(s) (Lokale lister)	2
Total number of members:	19

Lyngen herredsstyre 1955–1959
Party name (in Norwegian)	Number of representatives
Labour Party (Arbeiderpartiet)	13
Communist Party (Kommunistiske Parti)	4
Liberal Party (Venstre)	1
Local List(s) (Lokale lister)	1
Total number of members:	19

Lyngen herredsstyre 1951–1955
Party name (in Norwegian)	Number of representatives
Labour Party (Arbeiderpartiet)	10
Communist Party (Kommunistiske Parti)	4
Liberal Party (Venstre)	1
Local List(s) (Lokale lister)	1
Total number of members:	16

Lyngen herredsstyre 1947–1951
Party name (in Norwegian)	Number of representatives
Labour Party (Arbeiderpartiet)	11
Communist Party (Kommunistiske Parti)	3
Local List(s) (Lokale lister)	2
Total number of members:	16

Lyngen herredsstyre 1945–1947
Party name (in Norwegian)	Number of representatives
Labour Party (Arbeiderpartiet)	11
Communist Party (Kommunistiske Parti)	5
Total number of members:	16

Lyngen herredsstyre 1937–1941*
Party name (in Norwegian)	Number of representatives
Labour Party (Arbeiderpartiet)	13
Liberal Party (Venstre)	1
List of workers, fishermen, and small farmholders (Arbeidere, fiskere, småbrukere liste)	2
Total number of members:	16
Note: Due to the German occupation of Norway during World War II, no elections were held for new municipal councils until after the war ended in 1945.

=== Mayors ===
The mayor (Norwegian: ordfører) of Lyngen Municipality is the political leader of the municipality and the chairperson of the municipal council. Here is a list of people who have held this position:

- 1838–1845: Rev. Niels Wolff Christie
- 1846–1849: Didrik Christian Steensohn
- 1850–1857: Rev. Christian Magdalus Cold Neumann
- 1858–1861: Didrik Christian Steensohn
- 1862–1864: Rev. Jacob Marensius Hvoslef
- 1865–1870: Samuel Georg Simon Wenneberg
- 1871–1872: Dr. Richard Morten Clason
- 1873–1876: Samuel Georg Simon Wenneberg
- 1877–1880: Lars Joramo
- 1881–1882: Rev. Ole Stuevold Hansen (V)
- 1883–1892: Lars Olai Larsen
- 1893–1898: Anton Giæver
- 1898–1913: Aleksander Eriksen (V)
- 1913–1925: Ola Krogseng Giæver (H)
- 1926–1929: Anton Martinius Danielsen Meedby (Ap)
- 1929–1931: Isak Øvergård
- 1932–1934: Emil Larssen (Ap)
- 1935–1937: Reidar Longva (Ap)
- 1937–1940: Kristian Larsen (Ap)
- 1940–1941: Isak Øvergård (NS)
- 1941–1942: Reidar Longva (NS)
- 1942–1945: Carl Rasmussen (NS)
- 1945–1947: Kristian Larsen (Ap)
- 1948–1951: Jentoft Mikalsen (Ap)
- 1951–1955: Lars Kiil (Ap)
- 1956–1960: Sverre Odd Soløy (Ap)
- 1960–1969: Lindberg Holm (Ap)
- 1970–1971: Fridgeir Eriksen (Ap)
- 1972–1975: Albrigt M. Albrigtsen (Ap)
- 1975–1987: Hans Petter Myrland (Ap)
- 1987–1995: Odd Larssen (Ap)
- 1995–1999: Roger Alex Hansen (Ap)
- 2007–2011: Hans Karlsen (FrP)
- 2011–2015: Sølvi Gunn Jensen (Ap)
- 2015–2023: Dan Håvard Johnsen (Local list)
- 2023–present: Eirik Larsen (Local list)

== Notable people ==
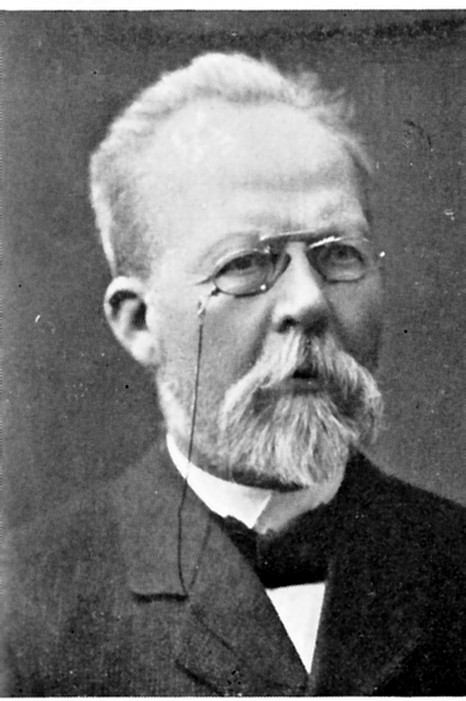
Just Qvigstad, 1934

- Just Knud Qvigstad (1853 in Lyngseidet – 1957), a philologist, linguist, ethnographer, historian, cultural historian, headmaster in Tromsø, and mayor of Tromsø
- Joachim Giæver (1856 in Jøvik – 1925), an American civil engineer who designed major structures in the USA
- Leonhard Seppala (1877 in Lyngen – 1967), a sled dog breeder, trainer, and musher who competed in the 1932 Winter Olympics
- Ola Krogseng Giæver (1885 in Lyngseidet – 1945), a farmer, politician, and mayor of Lyngen from 1913 to 1925
- Ingvald Jaklin (1896 in Lyngen – 1966), a politician and mayor of Tromsø
- Runo Isaksen (born 1968 in Lyngen), a writer
- Trond Olsen (born 1984 in Lyngen), a former footballer with over 400 club caps
- Maria Nysted Grønvoll (born 1985 in Furuflaten), a retired cross-country skier
