= Lyngseidet =

Village in Lyngen Municipality, Norway

Lyngseidet: Lyngseidet (Norwegian); Muotka (Kven); Muotki (Northern Sami); Ivgomuotki (Northern Sami)
- Village
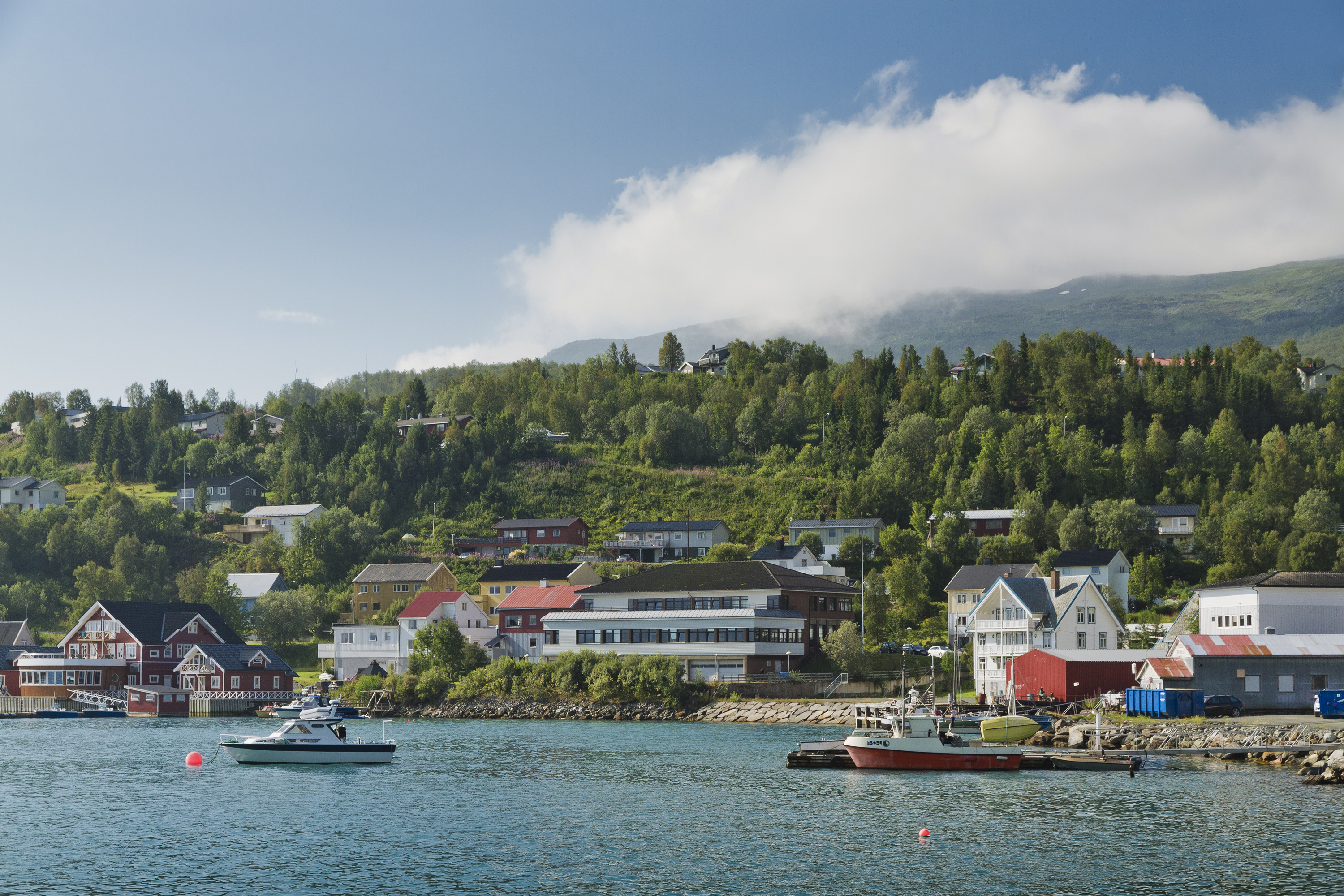
- View of the village
- Interactive map of Lyngseidet
- Location within Troms Location within Norway
- Coordinates: 69.5763°N 20.2188°E
- Country: Norway
- Region: Northern Norway
- County: Troms
- District: Nord-Troms
- Municipality: Lyngen Municipality

Area
  - Total: 0.88 km^{2} (0.34 sq mi)
- Elevation: 5 m (16 ft)

Population (2023)
  - Total: 736
  - Density: 836/km^{2} (2,170/sq mi)
- Time zone: UTC+01:00 (CET)
  - Summer (DST): UTC+02:00 (CEST)
- Post Code: 9060 Lyngseidet

Lyngseidet (Norwegian), Muotki or Ivgumuotki (Northern Sami), or Muotka (Kven) is the administrative centre of Lyngen Municipality in Troms county, Norway. The village is located on an isthmus that is about 3 km (1.9 mi) wide between an arm of the Ullsfjorden and the Lyngenfjorden.

The village is home to two grocery stores, Lyngen Church, nursing home, schools, daycare, pharmacy and library. A 9-metre (30 ft) tall plastic figure Santa Claus named Gollis is also located here. Lyngseidet is located 15 km (9.3 mi) north of the village of Furuflaten and 12 km (7.5 mi) by ferry from Olderdalen, in the neighboring Kåfjord Municipality. The 0.88-square-kilometre (220-acre) village has a population (2023) of 736 and a population density of 836 inhabitants per square kilometre (2,170/sq mi).
