= Rock carvings at Tennes =

Prehistoric rock art in Norway

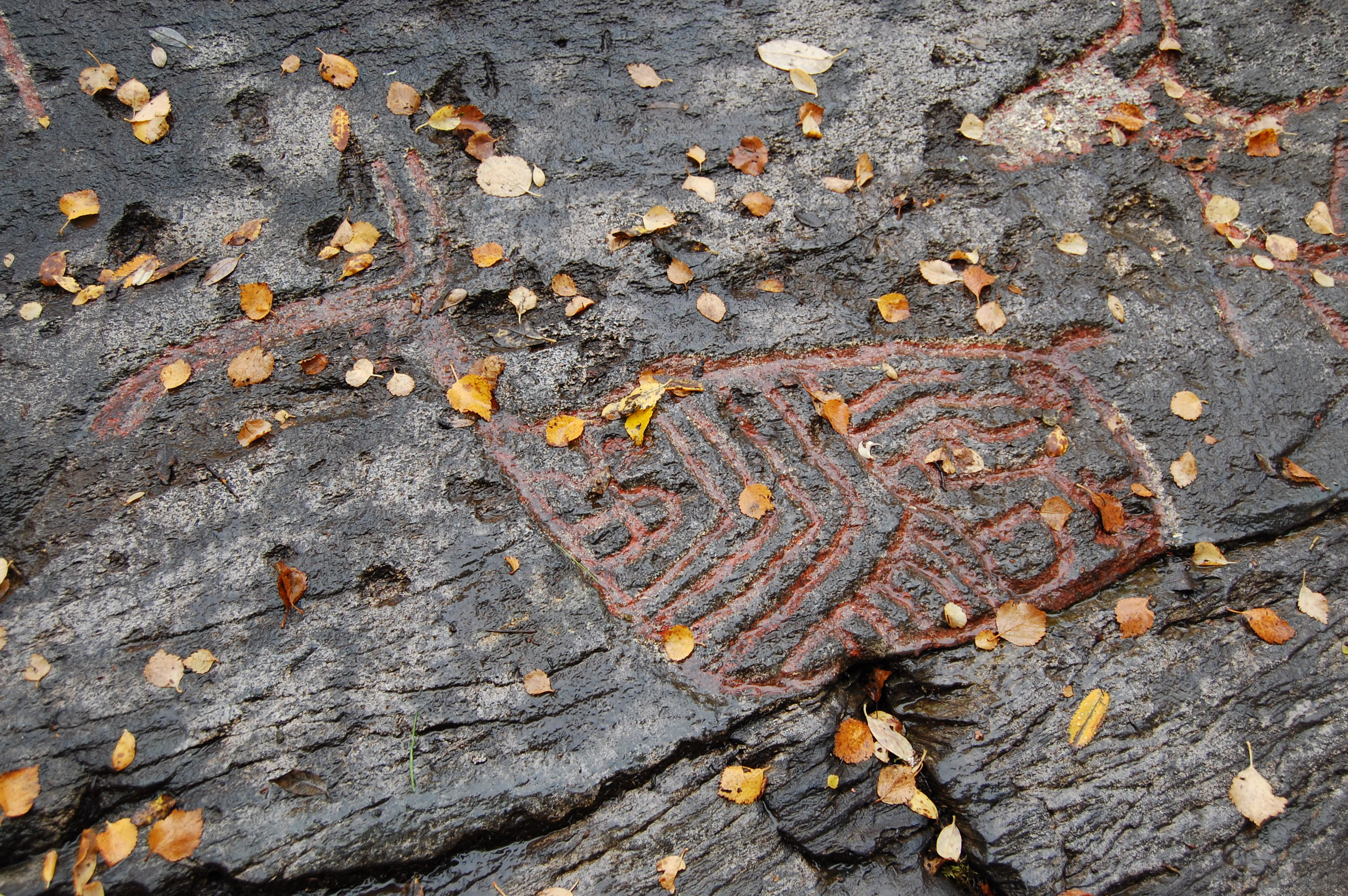
Bukkhammeren: Stag carved in Balsfjord, Norway as described by Martin Vahl

Rock carvings at Tennes (Helleristning i Tennes) in Balsfjord Municipality in Troms county, Norway comprise figures of prehistoric rock art (bergkunst). The oldest figures have been dated to 4600 BC and the most recent to about 2600 BC . The figures were the first from a hunting culture that were discovered in Scandinavia.

== Discovery and rediscovery ==
Prehistoric rock art (Bergkunst) was first mentioned in 1799 in the travel notes of professor Martin Vahl, where he described a stag carved in the mountain at a farm in Balsfjord. Prof. Vahl was a botanist at Copenhagen University, and the first botanist to visit Northern Norway.

However, these notes remained forgotten until 1913, when employees at University of Copenhagen Botanical Garden went through the notes of Prof. Vahl. At that time archeologist had started to gain an interest in rock carvings, and the finding triggered Swedish archeologist Gustaf Hallström to travel to Balsfjord to find the rock carving.

To find the carvings located somewhere along the 70-kilometre (43 mi) long fjord, Hallström exploited the knowledge that a professor travelling in the 18th century must have lived on one of the ten large farms that existed along the Balsfjorden. One of these farms was Tennes where the locals recognized Prof. Vahl's drawing of the stag.

The locals led Hallström to Bukkhammaren, where they found the stag and five other animal figures. A few hundred meters away at Gråbergan they found additional figures. At this time these were the northernmost rock carvings in the world (today rock carvings have been found further north such as the several thousand figures at Alta).

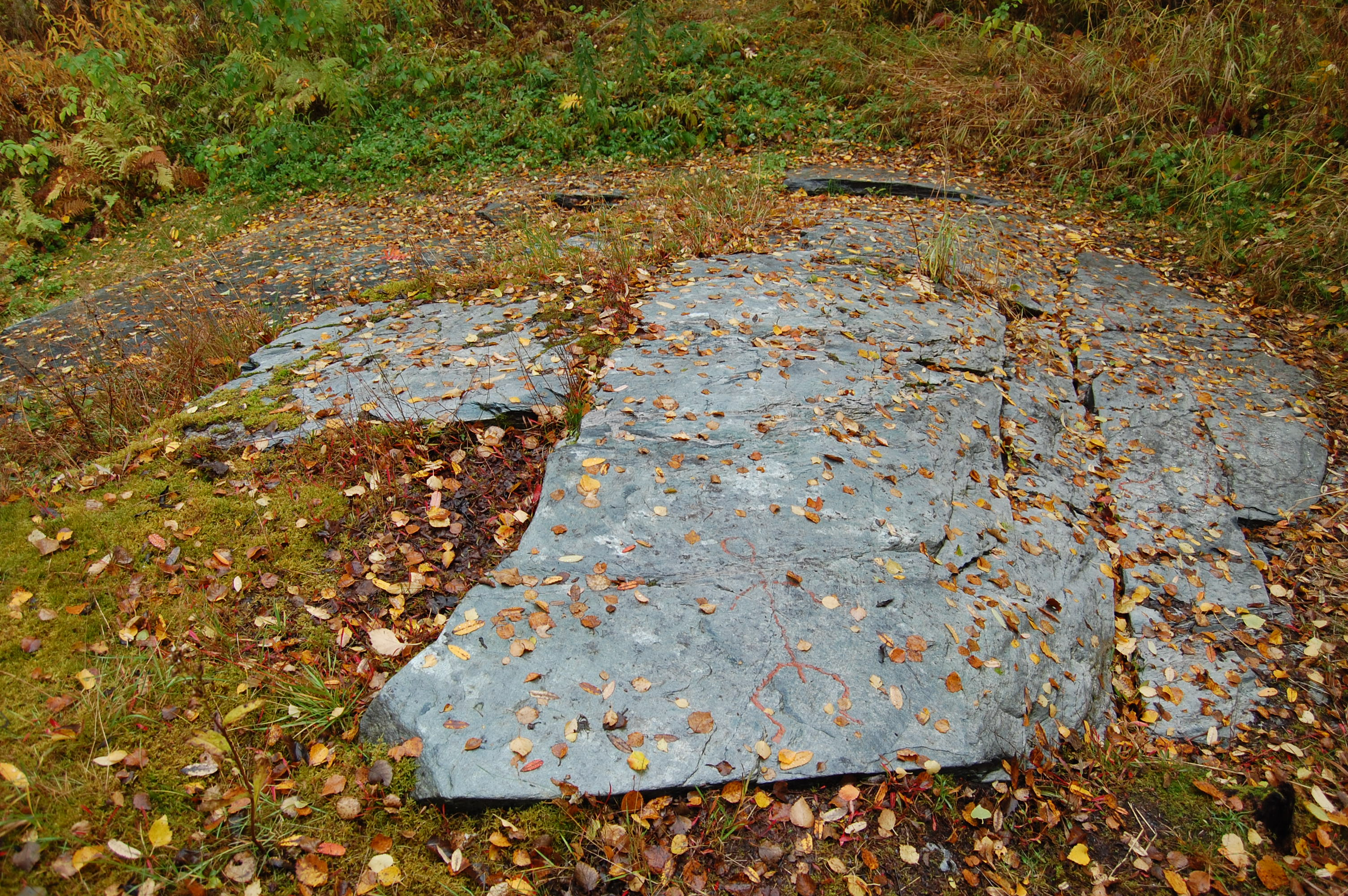
The Gråbergan field.

Later in 1938 at a meeting in the local knitting circle, the priest's wife showed books describing the rocks carvings above the priest's farm. Tordis Larsen from the neighboring farm became inspired and shortly after found the field with most figures at Tennes on the Larsen farm. This field known as Kirkely had about 40 figures.

== Rock carvings ==
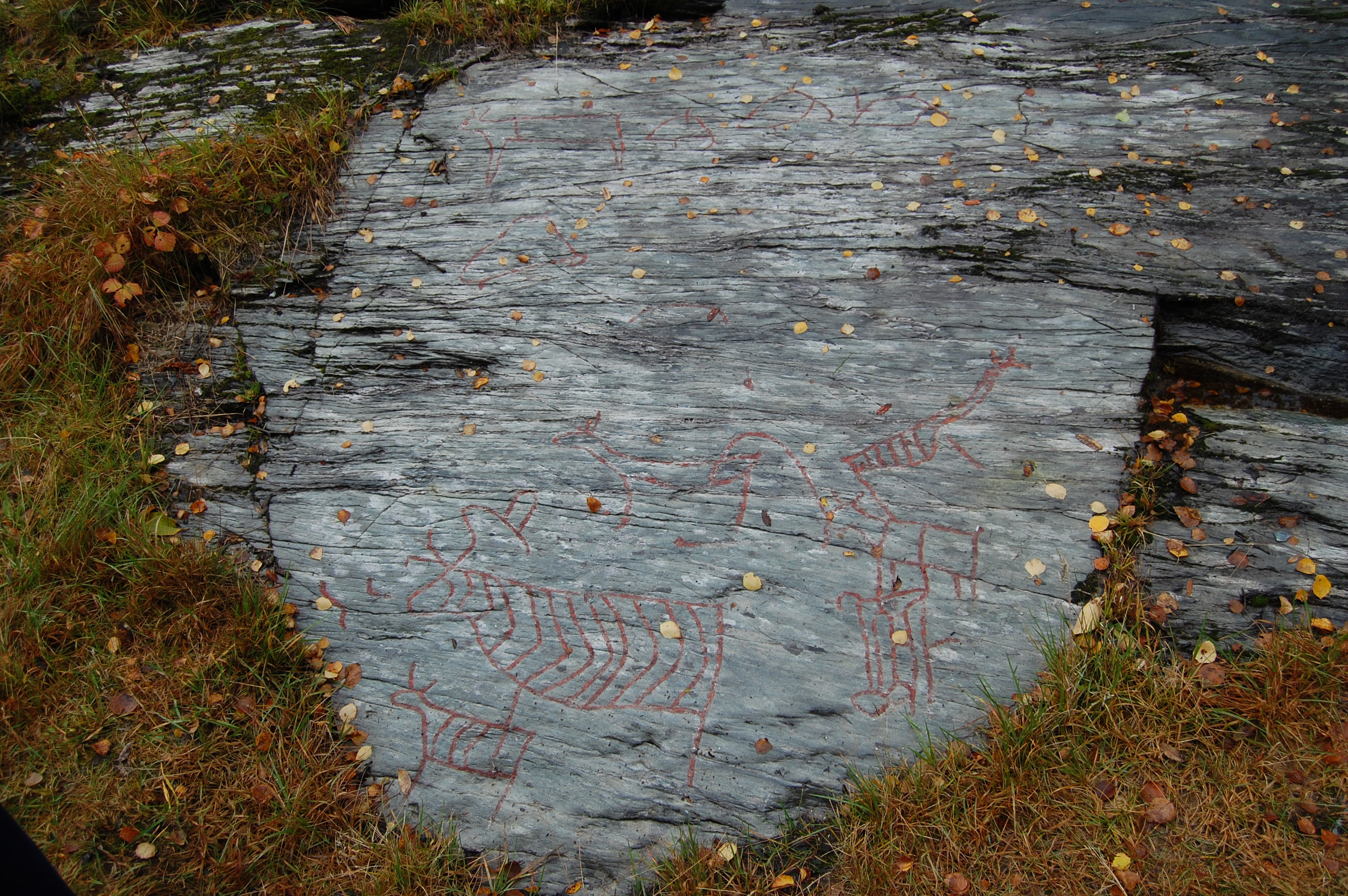
Rock carvings on the Kirkely field.

There are about 60 figures distributed over three fields: Bukkhammaren, Gråbergan, and Kirkely. The figures were carved in what was at the time of carving on the seashore, but today these are situated about 20 metres (66 ft) above sea level.

The oldest figures are on Bukkhammaren and these have been dated to 4600 BCE. There are only six figures, five of them are of moose, which all face the same direction. The sixth figure is undetermined. The largest figure is 1.1 metres (3 ft 7 in).

The 40 figures at Kirkely are from about 2700 BCE, and consists of both sea and land animals (a rare combination for rocks carvings in Northern Norway). There are also 2 figures of people in boats, and some unidentified figures. 13 of the figures are of porpoise, while 14 are of moose or reindeer. There is one snake-like figure, and one skålgrop. The largest figure is a reindeer with a length of about 1.2m.

The 19 figures at Gråbergan are from about 2600 BCE, and show two people figures together with 17 figures of land animals. The size of the figures range from 1–20 centimetres (0.39–7.87 in). The animals seems to have been carved such that animals migrating between the seashore and mainland are more on the seaside, while animals in the mainland such as bear and moose are away from the sea.

== Carvers ==
The carvings show that there had been people living at Tennes since the Stone Age. These people were probably hunters, who in the late Stone Age migrated between different living areas throughout the year. Tennes may already at that time have been a meeting place for the people living in the mainland (mountains), along the seashore, and on the islands.

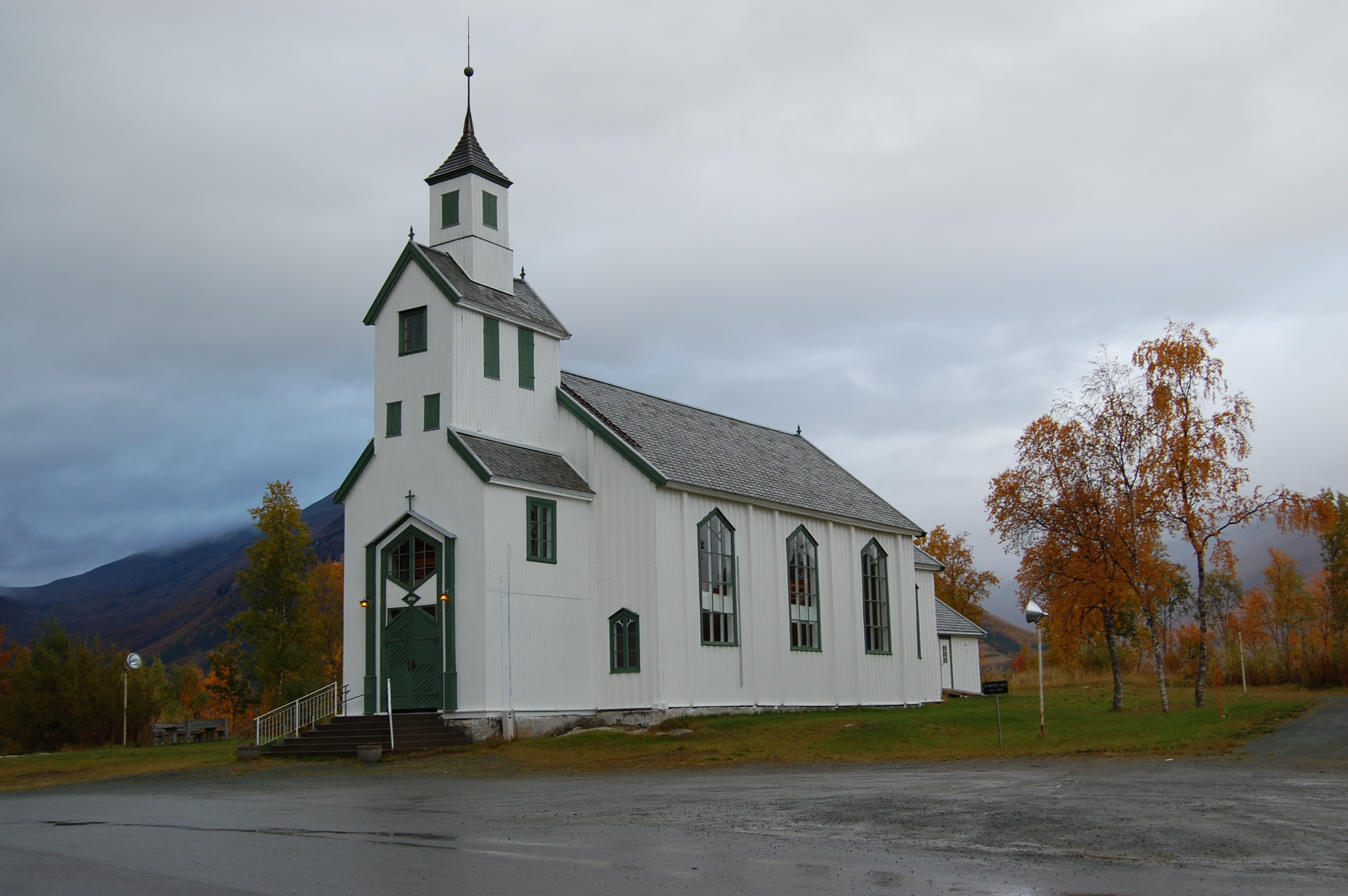
Balsfjord Church where the trail to the rock carvings starts

== Location ==
The only transportation to Tennes is by car, and it is about a 30-minute drive from the E8-E6 intersection, and about two hours from Tromsø. Road signs show the direction. The rock carvings are accessible by a 2.5 kilometres (1.6 mi) long well-marked track starting from Balsfjord Church. The church (built in 1855) is located in Tennes, which is about 10 kilometres (6.2 mi) from the village of Storsteinnes (in Troms county in Norway).

== See also ==
- Petroglyph
- Pre-historic art
- Rock carvings at Åsli
- List of rock carvings in Norway

== Sources ==
- The article was based in part upon material in: Fotefar mot Nord by Ottar Grepstad, with Kirsti Mathilde Thorheim and photography by Guri Dahl (Forlaget Press og landsdelsutvalget for Nord-Norge og Nord-Trondelag. 2003) (in Norwegian)
- Additional information included Tennes (Prestegården), Balsfjord kommune from Helleristningsguide - Bilder I Berg I Norden (in Norwegian)

== Related reading ==
- Boyle, Andrew J. (2008) Solskip og stjerneguder (Fredrikstad: forlaget Opphav) ISBN 978-82-997845-0-4 (in Norwegian)
- Simonsen, Povl (1973) Sydskandinaviske Helleristningar I Nord-Norge. (Universitetesforlaget, Tromsø-Oslo-Bergen) (in Norwegian)
