= Balsfjord =

Balsfjord or Balsfjorden may refer to:

== Places ==
- Balsfjord Municipality, a municipality in Troms county, Norway
- Balsfjorden, a fjord in Troms county, Norway
- Balsfjord Church, a church in Balsfjord Municipality in Troms county, Norway
