= Rock carvings at Åsli =

Prehistoric rock art in Norway

The rock carvings at Åsli are located near the Malangen fjord in Balsfjord Municipality in Troms county, Norway . The carvings show at least 15 figures in poor condition. The figures are from a hunting culture.

== Rock carvings ==
There are at least 15 figures on a 20 square metres (220 sq ft) field that is located about 20 metres (66 ft) above the sea level. At least eight of the figures are of reindeer. There are also figures of porpoise, a boat, and possibly a moose. Most of the figures are small, but the largest figure is about 1 metre (3 ft 3 in).

== Carvers ==
The carvings are from a hunting culture (veidekultur).

== How to get there ==
The field is on a rock (svaberg) by a water fall on the river starting from Nordfjordvatnet, above the Åsli farm that is in Nordfjorden about 1 kilometre (0.62 mi) from the village of Storsteinnes in Balsfjord Municipality. Due to the poor condition of the figures they can be difficult to spot.

== See also ==
- Petroglyph
- Pre-historic art
- Rock carvings at Tennes
- List of rock carvings in Norway
