= Mack Brewery =

Norwegian brewery

Macks Ølbryggeri AS
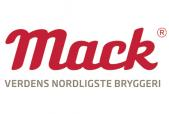
- Location: Nordkjosbotn, Norway
- Opened: 1877
- Owner: Harald Bredrup
- Website: www.mack.no

Mack Bryggeri (English: Mack Brewery; Norwegian official name: Macks Ølbryggeri AS) is a brewery in Balsfjord Municipality in Troms county, Norway. Founded during 1877 in Tromsø by Ludwig Markus Mack (1842–1915), it claimed to be the world's northernmost brewery.

== Claims of the world's northernmost brewery ==
Mack Bryggeri claimed to be the northernmost brewery in the world. After over 130 years of operation in Tromsø, in March 2012 the company moved production to Nordkjosbotn in Balsfjord Municipality, and lost the title to the brewery operated inside the Icefiord Hotel in Ilulissat (Greenland) by a margin of a mere 50 metres (160 ft). When Hotel Icefjiord closed their brewery in 2013, the brewery equipment was taken over by Brewery Immiaq (also in Ilulissat). In 2015, Svalbard Bryggeri claimed the northernmost brewery in the world at 78 degrees North.

== Related reading ==
- Sanner, J. Mack's bryggeri gjennom 75 år. 1877–1952 (Tromsø. 1953)
- Høeg, E. I. Bryggerieier Ludvig Macks etterslekt (Larvik. 1994)
