= Gunda Johansen =

Norwegian politician (born 1952)

Gunda Pauline Johansen (born 2 May 1952) is a Norwegian politician for the Labour Party.

She served as a deputy representative to the Norwegian Parliament from Troms county during the term 2005–2009. On the local level, Johansen was elected mayor of Balsfjord Municipality in 2003.
