= Nordkjosbotn Church =

- Nordkjosbotn kirke
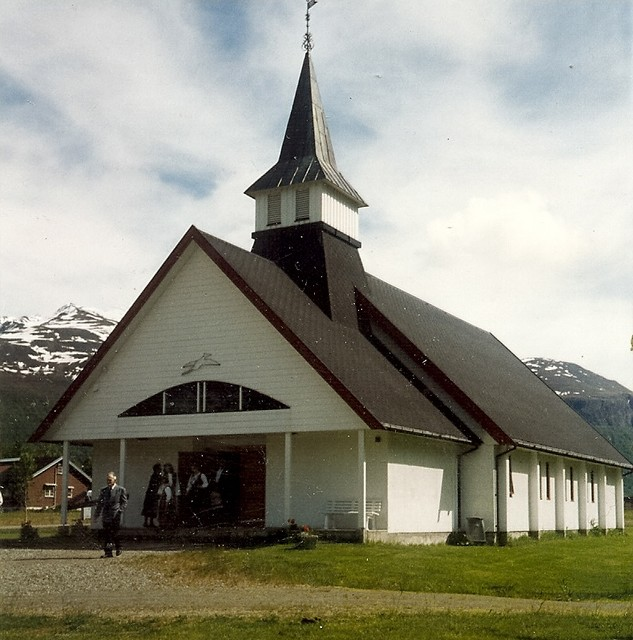
- View of the church
- Nordkjosbotn Church
- 69.215761°N 19.562038°E
- Location: Balsfjord Municipality, Troms
- Country: Norway
- Denomination: Church of Norway
- Churchmanship: Evangelical Lutheran

History
- Status: Chapel
- Consecrated: 1987

Architecture
- Functional status: Active
- Architect: Åge Pedersen
- Architectural type: Long church
- Completed: 1987 (39 years ago)

Specifications
- Capacity: 260
- Materials: Wood and aggregate concrete

Administration
- Diocese: Nord-Hålogaland
- Deanery: Senja prosti
- Parish: Balsfjord

Nordkjosbotn Church (Norwegian: Nordkjosbotn kirke) is a chapel of the Church of Norway in Balsfjord Municipality in Troms county, Norway. It is located in the village of Nordkjosbotn. It is one of the churches for the Balsfjord parish which is part of the Senja prosti (deanery) in the Diocese of Nord-Hålogaland. The white, wood and aggregate concrete church was built in a long church style in 1987 using plans drawn up by the architect Åge Pedersen. The church seats about 260 people.

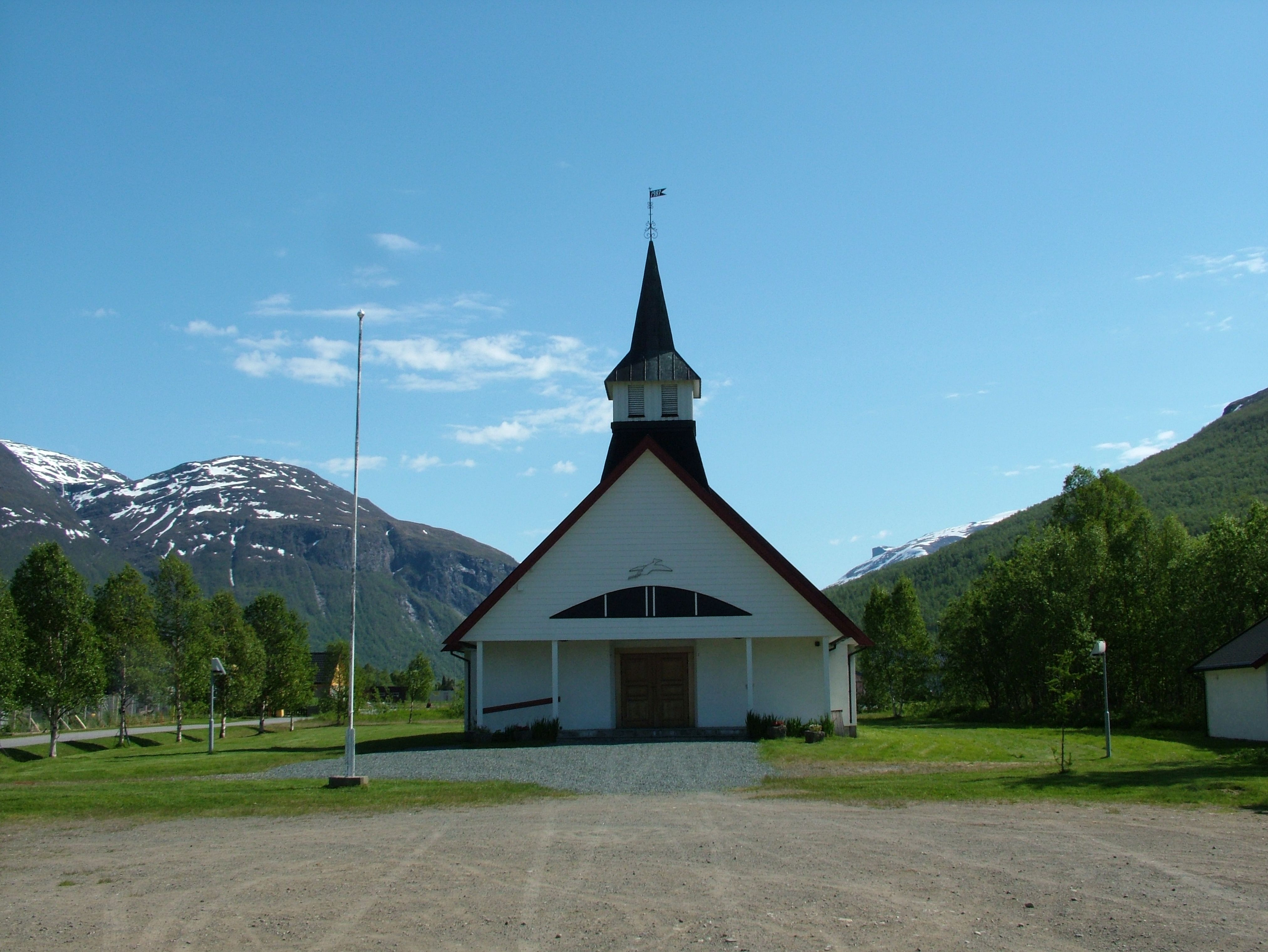
View of the church

== See also ==
- List of churches in Nord-Hålogaland
