= Nordkjosbotn =

Village in Balsfjord Municipality, Norway

Nordkjosbotn (Norwegian) Gárgán (Northern Sami)
- Village
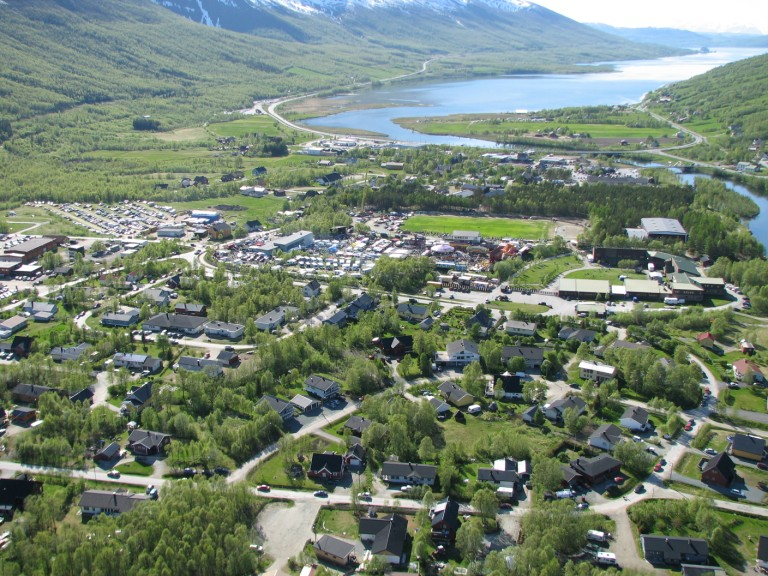
- View of the village
- Interactive map of Nordkjosbotn (Norwegian); Gárgán (Northern Sami)
- Location within Troms Location within Norway
- Coordinates: 69.2174°N 19.5583°E
- Country: Norway
- Region: Northern Norway
- County: Troms
- District: Hålogaland
- Municipality: Balsfjord Municipality

Area
  - Total: 0.72 km^{2} (0.28 sq mi)
- Elevation: 6 m (20 ft)

Population (2023)
  - Total: 483
  - Density: 671/km^{2} (1,740/sq mi)
- Time zone: UTC+01:00 (CET)
  - Summer (DST): UTC+02:00 (CEST)
- Post Code: 9040 Nordkjosbotn

Nordkjosbotn (Norwegian) or Gárgán (Northern Sami) is a small village in Balsfjord Municipality in Troms county, Norway. The village lies about 70 kilometres (43 mi) southeast of the city of Tromsø. The 0.72-square-kilometre (180-acre) village has a population (2023) of 483 and a population density of 671 inhabitants per square kilometre (1,740/sq mi).

Two major highways, European route E6 and European route E8, meet in this village, making it a major crossroads in Northern Norway, with an estimated annual passage of 3 million people. Nordkjosbotn Church is located in this village. Macks Ølbryggeri, a brewery, has been operating in Nordkjosbotn since 2012.

== Location ==
Nordkjosbotn is located at the end of the Nordkjosen branch of the Balsfjorden where the river Nordkjoselva meets the fjord. The village is about 1 kilometre (0.62 mi) wide filling the narrow valley between several mountains, some of which are more than 1,000 metres (3,300 ft) above sea level, most notably Store Russetind to the southwest. The village has an area of about 0.7 square kilometres (170 acres) and is located on a partially marshy alluvial plain formed by the Nordkjoselva river. The village of Storsteinnes lies about 20 kilometres (12 mi) west of Nordkjosbotn and the village of Hatteng (in Storfjord Municipality) lies about 20 kilometres (12 mi) to the east.

== Gallery ==
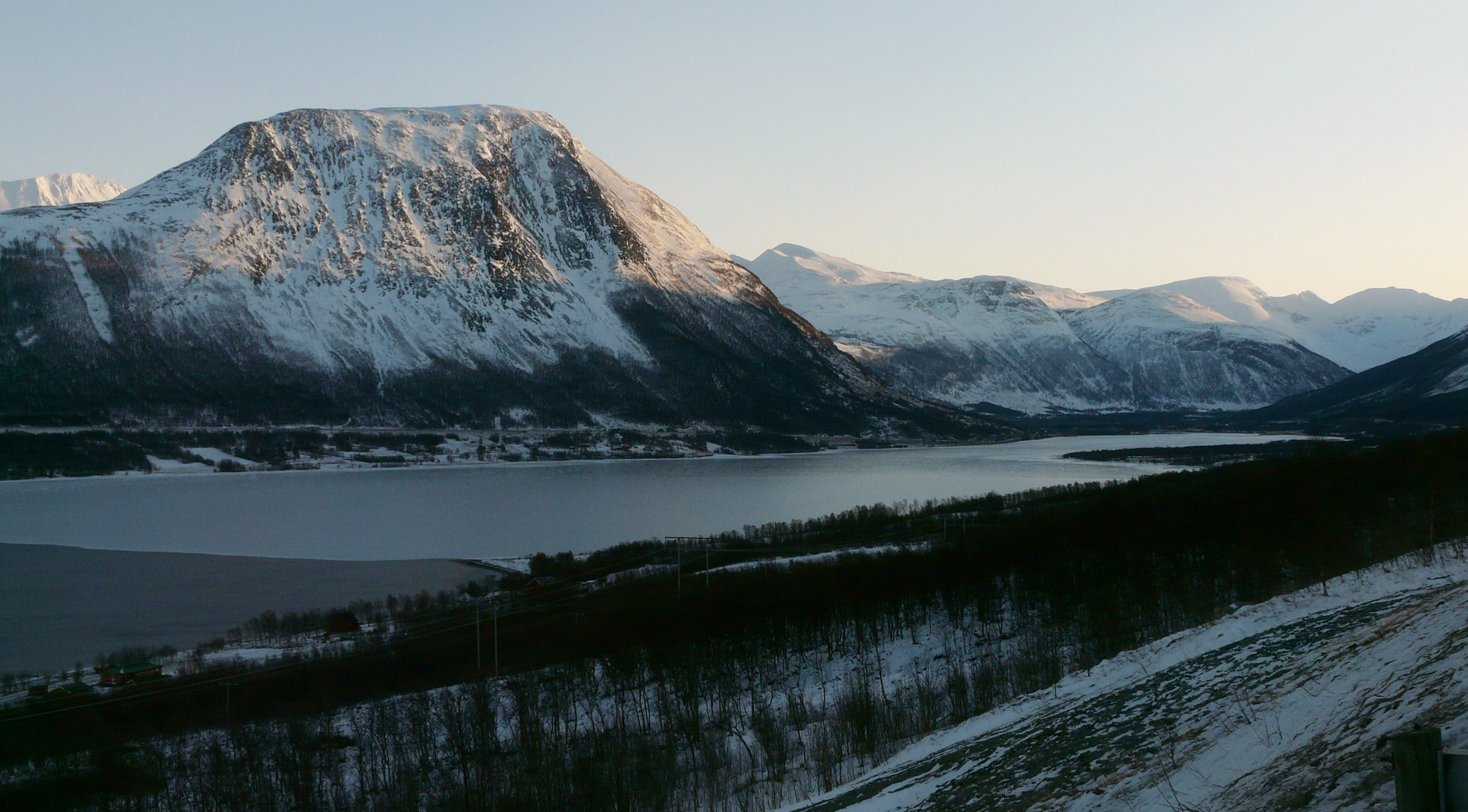
A morning view towards Nordkjosbotn from a road stop on the E6.

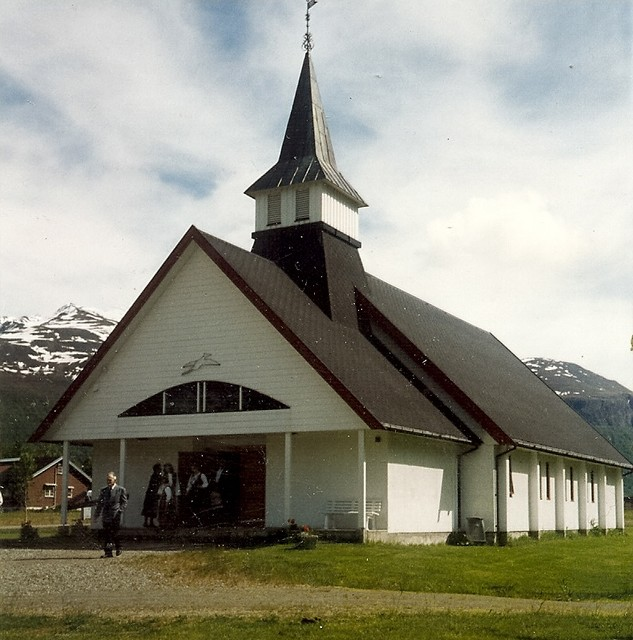
Nordkjosbotn Church

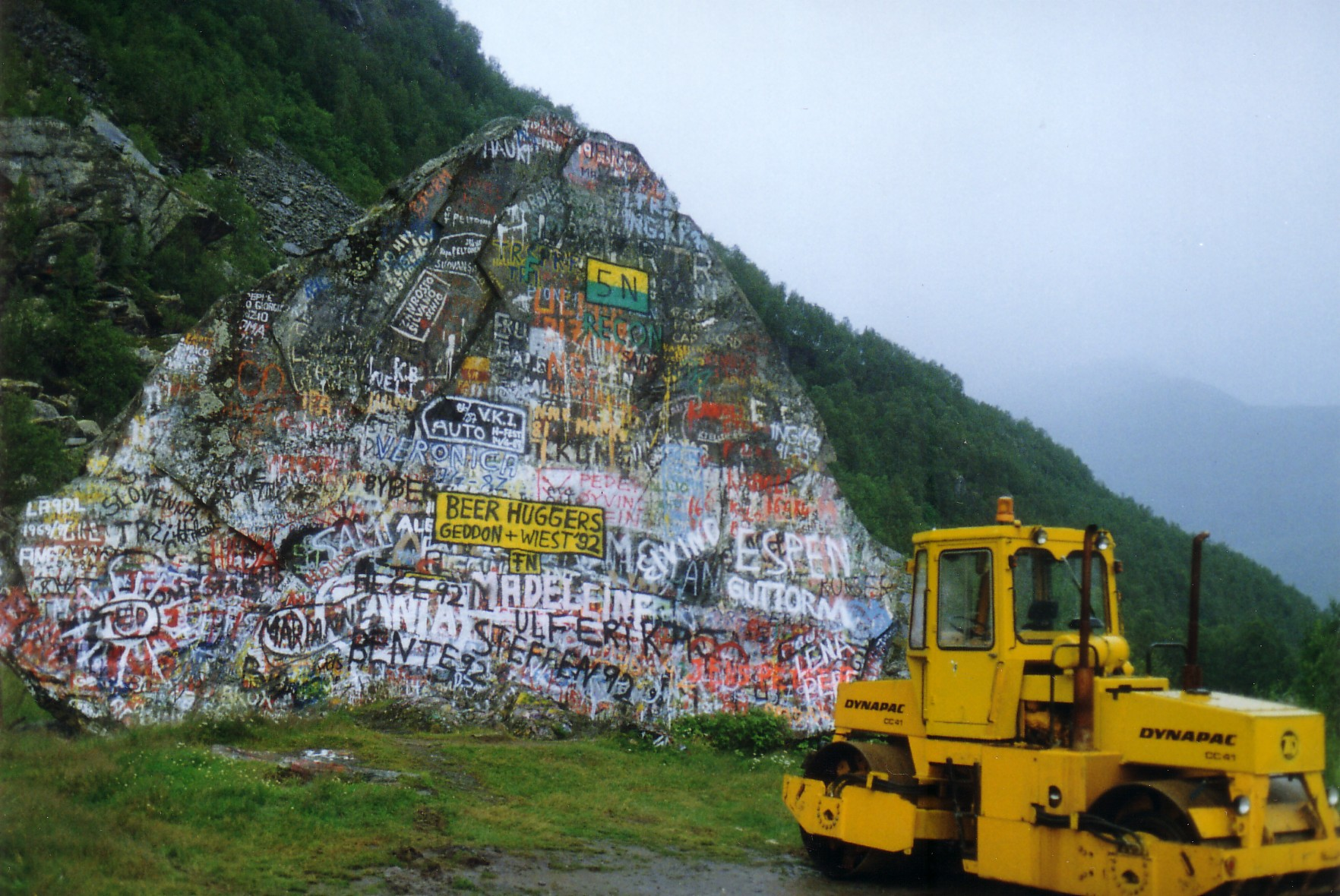
The Name Stone near Nordkjosbotn.
