= Storsteinnes Chapel =

- Storsteinnes kapell
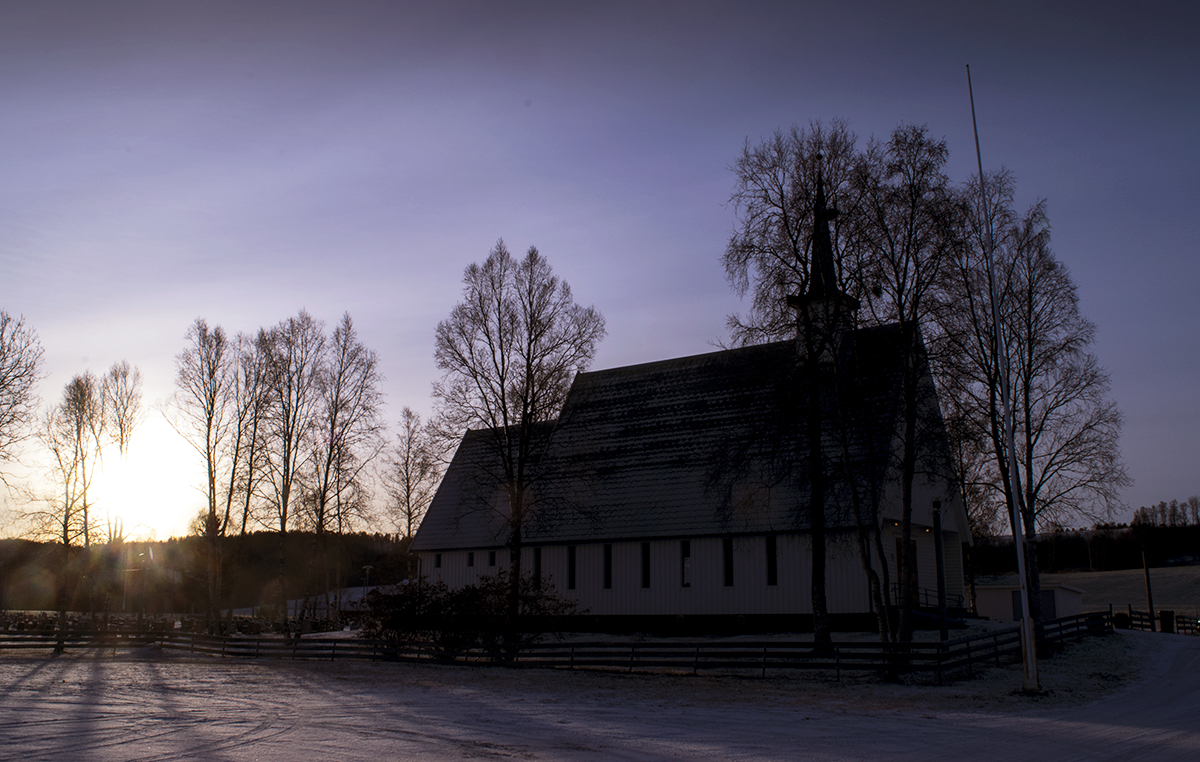
- View of the church
- Storsteinnes Chapel
- 69.260040°N 19.058533°E
- Location: Balsfjord Municipality, Troms
- Country: Norway
- Denomination: Church of Norway
- Churchmanship: Evangelical Lutheran

History
- Status: Parish church
- Founded: 1968
- Consecrated: 1968

Architecture
- Functional status: Active
- Architectural type: Long church
- Completed: 1968 (58 years ago)

Specifications
- Capacity: 200
- Materials: Wood

Administration
- Diocese: Nord-Hålogaland
- Deanery: Senja prosti
- Parish: Balsfjord
- Norwegian Cultural Heritage Site
- Type: Church
- Status: Not protected
- ID: 85586

Storsteinnes Chapel (Norwegian: Storsteinnes kapell) is a parish church of the Church of Norway in Balsfjord Municipality in Troms county, Norway. It is located on the south side of the village of Storsteinnes. It is one of the churches for the Balsfjord parish which is part of the Senja prosti (deanery) in the Diocese of Nord-Hålogaland. The white, wooden church was built in a long church style in 1968. The church seats about 200 people.

== See also ==
- List of churches in Nord-Hålogaland
