= Mestervik =

Village in Balsfjord Municipality, Norway

- Village
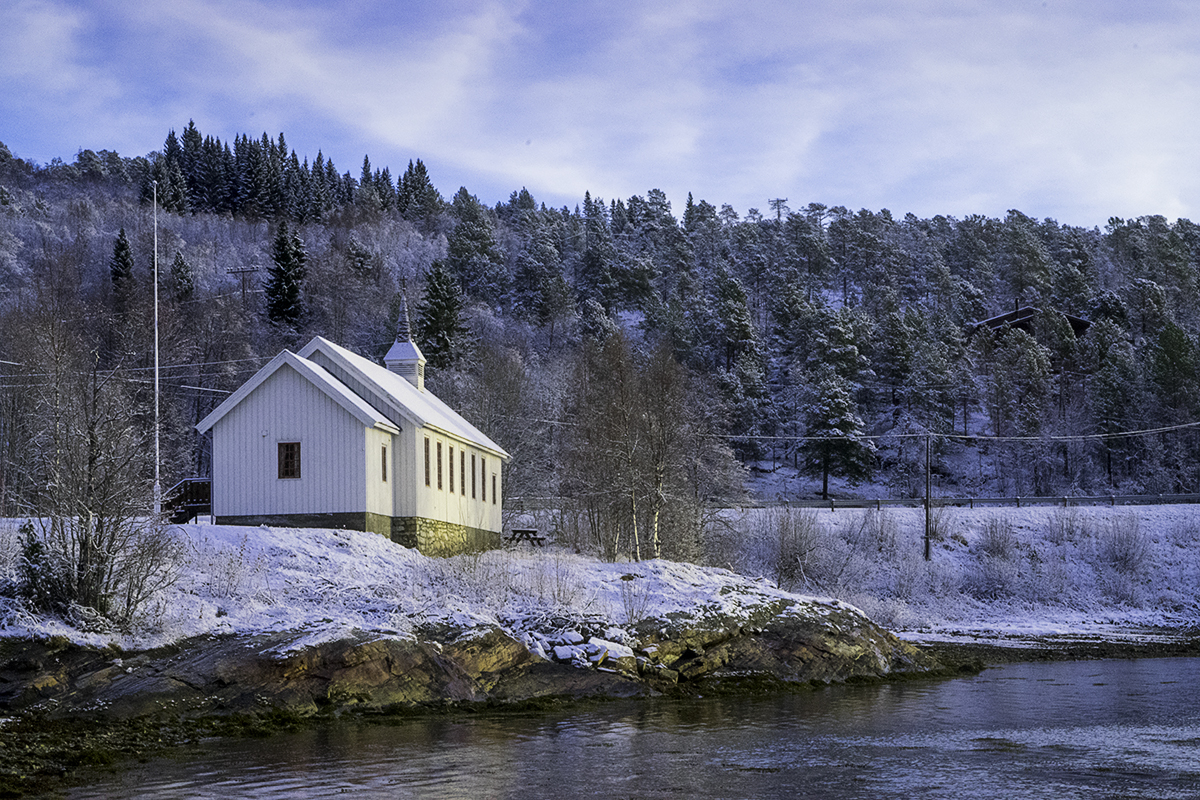
- View of the local church
- Interactive map of Mestervik
- Location within Troms Location within Norway
- Coordinates: 69.32866°N 18.93048°E
- Country: Norway
- Region: Northern Norway
- County: Troms
- District: Hålogaland
- Municipality: Balsfjord Municipality
- Elevation: 8 m (26 ft)
- Time zone: UTC+01:00 (CET)
  - Summer (DST): UTC+02:00 (CEST)
- Post Code: 9055 Meistervik

Mestervik or Meistervik is a village in Balsfjord Municipality in Troms county, Norway. The village is located near the southeastern end of the Malangen fjord, about 15 kilometres (9.3 mi) south of the village of Mortenhals. Mestervik Chapel is located here.
