= Mestervik Chapel =

- Mestervik kapell / Meistervik kapell
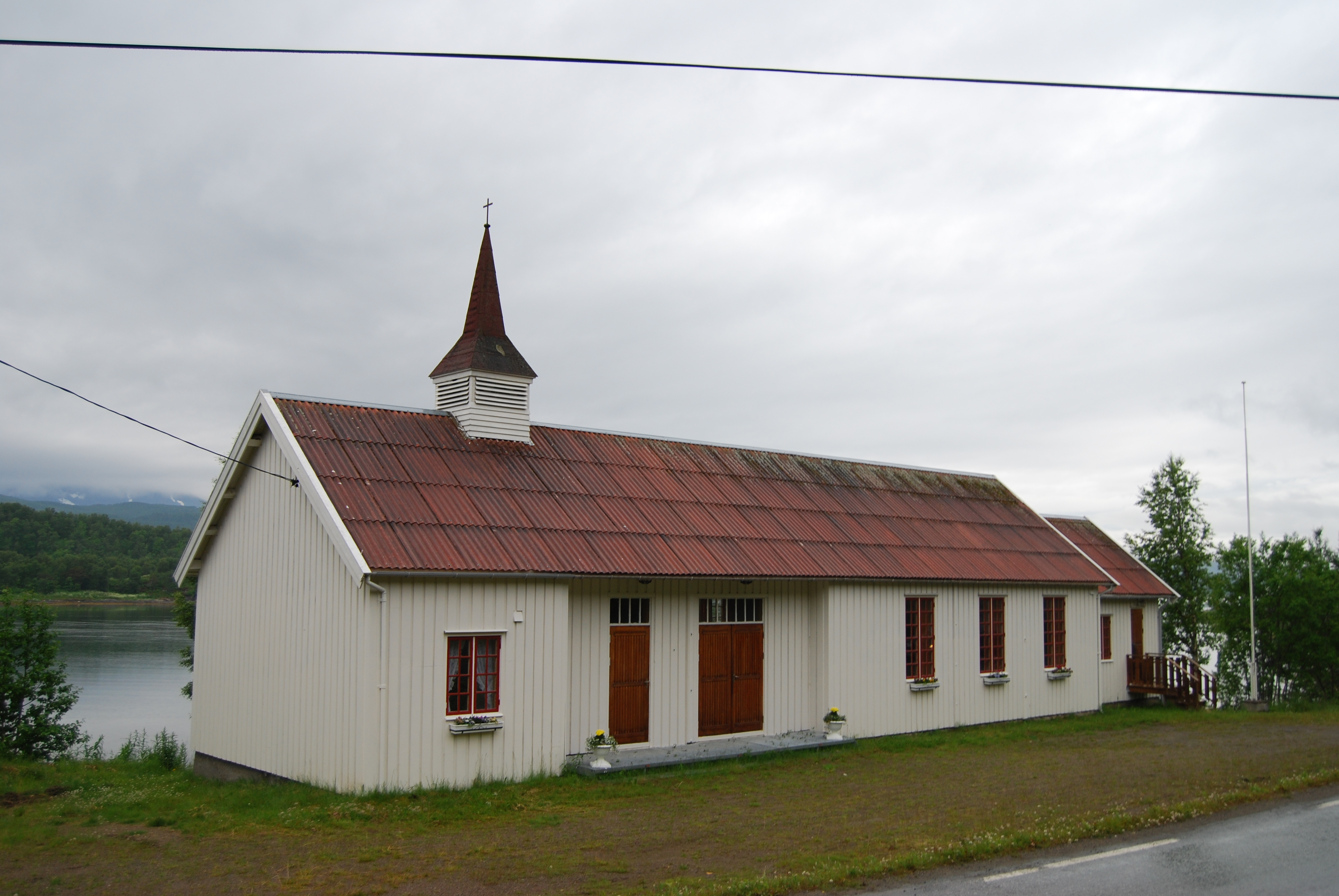
- View of the chapel
- Mestervik Chapel
- 69.3279499°N 18.9327545°E
- Location: Balsfjord Municipality, Troms
- Country: Norway
- Denomination: Church of Norway
- Churchmanship: Evangelical Lutheran

History
- Status: Chapel
- Founded: 1968
- Consecrated: 1968

Architecture
- Functional status: Active
- Architect: Kjell Hansen
- Architectural type: Long church
- Completed: 1968 (58 years ago)

Specifications
- Capacity: 100
- Materials: Wood

Administration
- Diocese: Nord-Hålogaland
- Deanery: Senja prosti
- Parish: Malangen
- Norwegian Cultural Heritage Site
- Type: Church
- Status: Not protected
- ID: 84931

Mestervik Chapel (Norwegian: Mestervik kapell / Meistervik kapell) is a chapel of the Church of Norway in Balsfjord Municipality in Troms county, Norway. It is located in the village of Mestervik. It is an annex chapel for the Malangen parish which is part of the Senja prosti (deanery) in the Diocese of Nord-Hålogaland. The white, wooden chapel was originally a school and it was rebuilt in a long church design in 1968 using plans drawn up by the architect Kjell Hansen. The church seats about 100 people.

== Media gallery ==
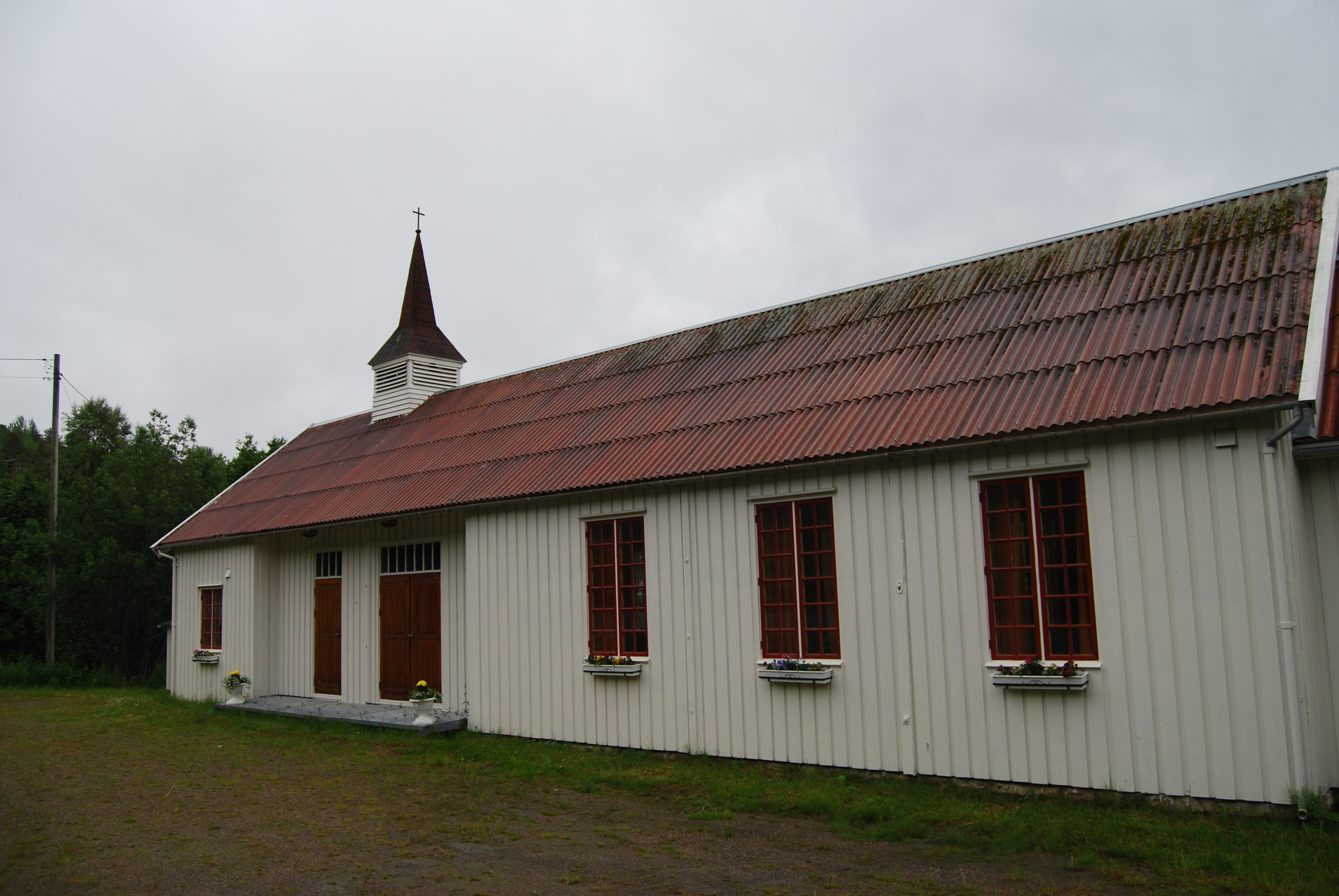

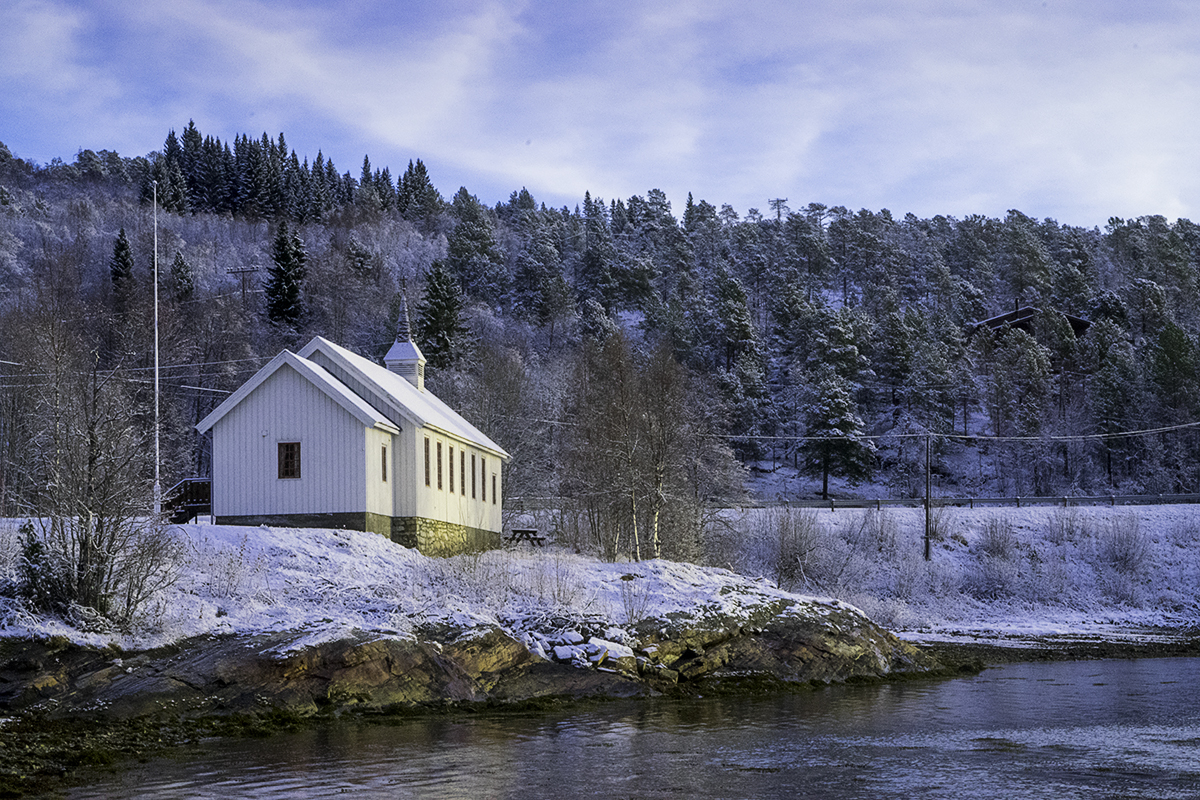

== See also ==
- List of churches in Nord-Hålogaland
