= Balsfjorden =

Fjord in Troms, Norway

Balsfjorden (Norwegian) Báhccavuotna (Northern Sami)
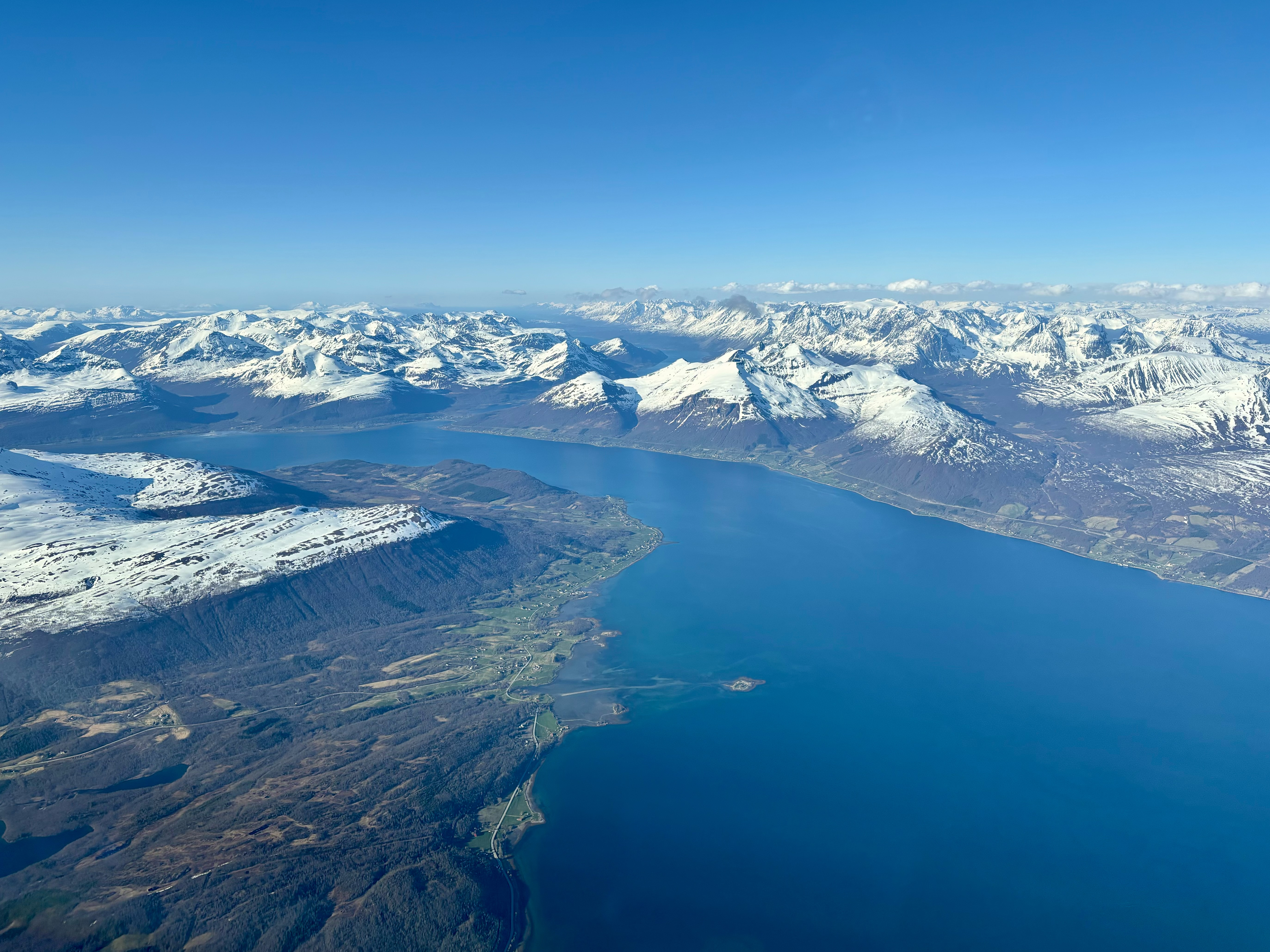
- Interactive map of the fjord
- Location: Troms county, Norway
- Coordinates: 69.474895°N 18.934937°E
- Type: Fjord
- Basin countries: Norway
- Max. length: 57 kilometres (35 mi)
- Max. width: 2 to 7 kilometres (1.2 to 4.3 mi)

Balsfjorden (Norwegian) or Báhccavuotna (Northern Sami) is a fjord in Troms county, Norway. The 57-kilometre (35 mi) long fjord runs through Balsfjord Municipality and Tromsø Municipality. It branches off the Tromsøysundet strait just south of the city of Tromsø and it flows in a north–south direction, ranging from 2 to 7 kilometres (1.2 to 4.3 mi) wide. The European route E8 highway follows most of the eastern shore of the fjord and the European route E6 highway runs along the southern end of the fjord. The village of Storsteinnes lies along the southwestern coast of the fjord and the village of Nordkjosbotn lies at the southeastern end of the fjord.

== See also ==
- List of Norwegian fjords
