= Balsfjord Municipality =

Municipality in Troms, Norway

Balsfjord Municipality Balsfjord kommune Báhccavuona suohkan (Northern Sami) Paatsivuonon komuuni (Kven)
- Municipality
- Balsfjorden herred (historic name)
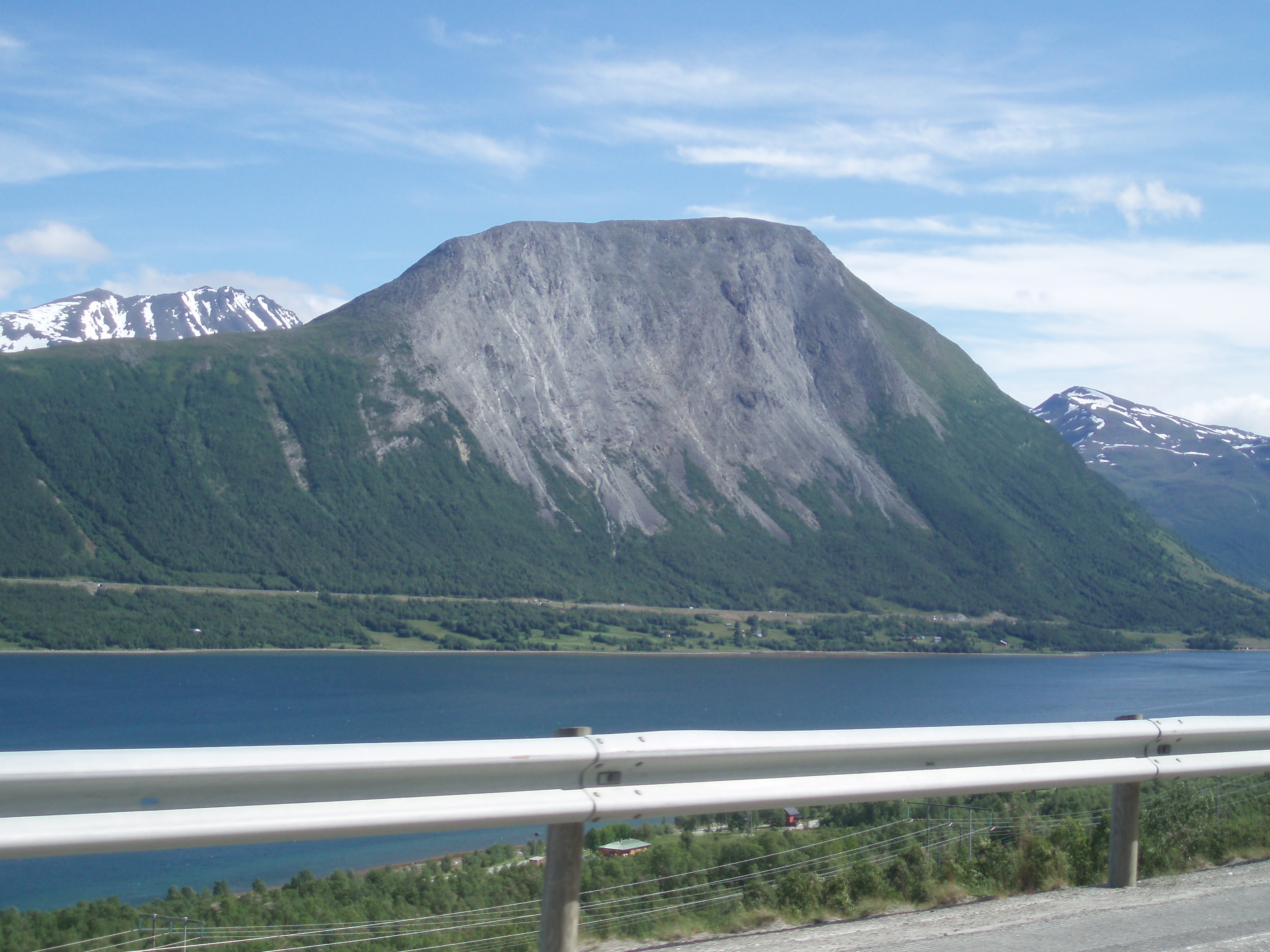
- View of Nordkjosbotn

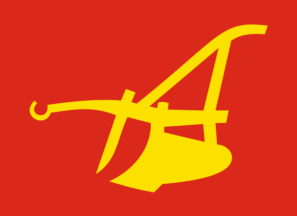
- Flag Coat of arms

- Troms within Norway

- Balsfjord within Troms
- Coordinates: 69°18′17″N 19°12′13″E
- Country: Norway
- County: Troms
- District: Hålogaland
- Established: 1860
  - Preceded by: Tromsøe landdistrikt
- Administrative centre: Storsteinnes

Government
  - Mayor (2023): Laila Monica Johannessen (Sp)

Area
  - Total: 1,496.99 km^{2} (577.99 sq mi)
  - Land: 1,440.03 km^{2} (556.00 sq mi)
  - Water: 56.96 km^{2} (21.99 sq mi) 3.8%
  - Rank: #58 in Norway
- Highest elevation: 1,587 m (5,207 ft)

Population (2024)
  - Total: 5,571
  - Rank: #173 in Norway
  - Density: 3.7/km^{2} (9.6/sq mi)
  - Change (10 years): ▼ −0.4%
- Demonym: Balsfjording

Official language
  - Norwegian form: Bokmål
- Time zone: UTC+01:00 (CET)
  - Summer (DST): UTC+02:00 (CEST)
- ISO 3166 code: NO-5532
- Website: Official website

Balsfjord (Northern Sami: Báhccavuotna - pronounced [ˈpaːhːt͡saˌvuo̯tna]; Kven: Paatsivuono) is a municipality in Troms county, Norway. The administrative centre of the municipality is the village of Storsteinnes. Other notable villages include Mestervik, Mortenhals, and Nordkjosbotn.

The 1,497-square-kilometre (578 sq mi) municipality is the 58th largest by area out of the 357 municipalities in Norway. Balsfjord is the 173rd most populous municipality in Norway with a population of 5,571. The municipality's population density is 3.7 inhabitants per square kilometre (9.6/sq mi) and its population has decreased by 0.4% over the previous 10-year period.

The municipality surrounds two fjords: Malangen and Balsfjorden, surrounded by comparatively rich farmlands under majestic peaks including the southern end of the Lyngen Alps.

== General information ==
Balsfjord was originally a part of the great Tromsøe landdistrikt municipality, but it was separated from this in 1860 to form its own municipality. Balsfjord had an initial population of 3,610. On 1 January 1871, the northwestern part of the municipality (population: 1,425) was separated from it to create the new Malangen Municipality. This left Balsfjord with 2,255 inhabitants. On 1 January 1875, a part of Lyngen Municipality (population: 7) was transferred to Balsfjord. On 1 January 1905, a part of Balsfjord (population: 5) was transferred to Målselv Municipality.

During the 1960s, there were many municipal mergers across Norway due to the work of the Schei Committee. On 1 January 1964, most of Balsfjord Municipality was merged with most of neighboring Malangen Municipality to form a new, larger Balsfjord Municipality (population: 6,993). Also on that day, the Skogli ved Heia area (population: 2) was transferred to the neighboring Målselv Municipality and the uninhabited Elvebakken farm was transferred to the neighboring Storfjord Municipality. On 1 January 1966, the Sørelvmo area of Balsfjord (population: 131) was transferred to Målselv Municipality.

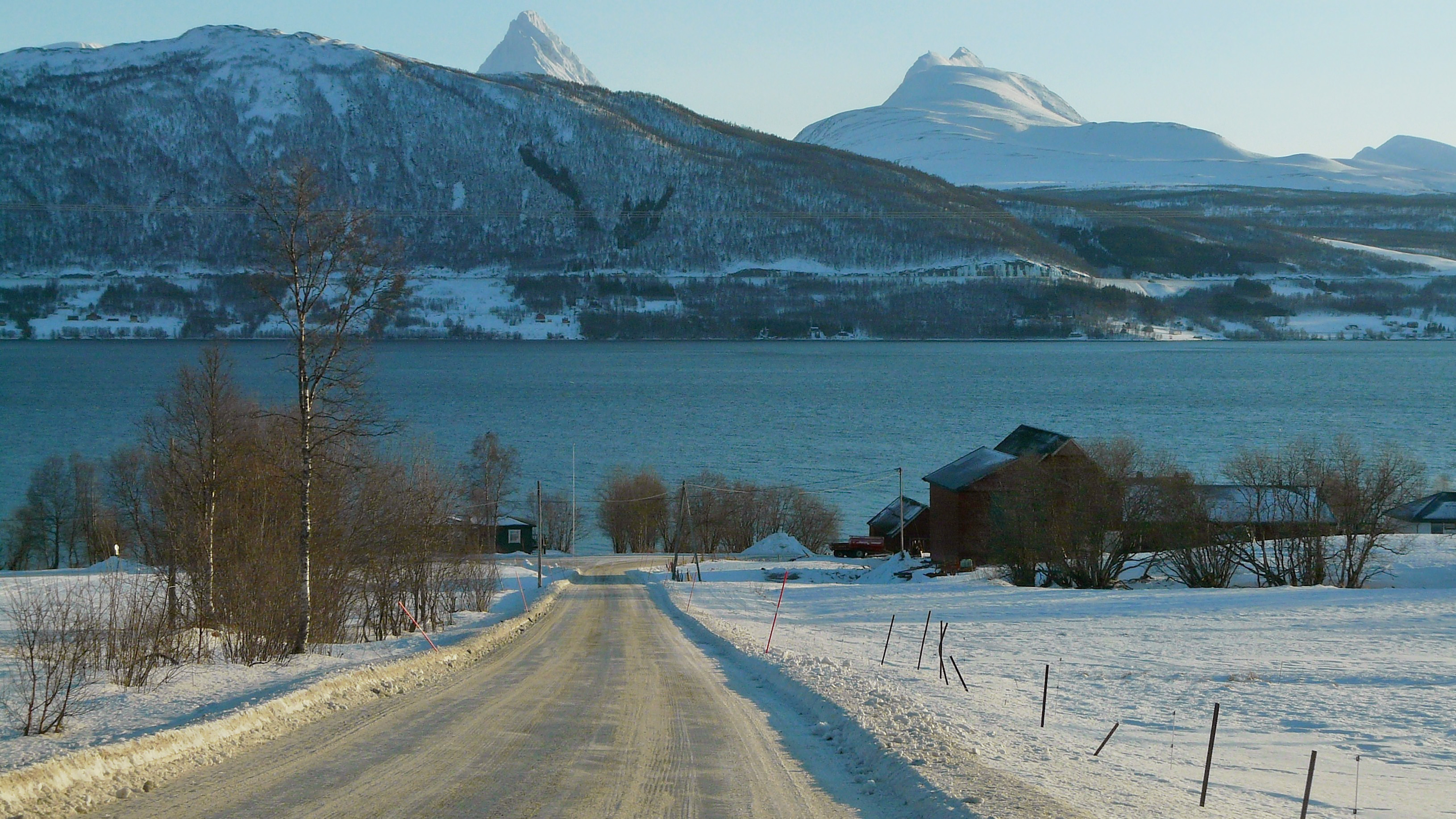
Part of Balsfjord in February

On 1 January 2020, the municipality became part of the newly formed Troms og Finnmark county. Previously, it had been part of the old Troms county. On 1 January 2024, the Troms og Finnmark county was divided and the municipality once again became part of Troms county.

=== Name ===
The municipality (originally the parish) is named after the local fjord: Balsfjorden (Northern Sami: Báhccavuotna). The meaning of the first element is uncertain, but is possibly associated with either the Norse god Baldr or the Old Norse word bals which means "lump". The last element is fjord which means "fjord". Historically, the name of the municipality was spelled Balsfjorden. On 6 January 1908, a royal resolution changed the spelling of the name of the municipality to Balsfjord, removing the definite form ending -en.

=== Coat of arms ===
The coat of arms was granted on 21 November 1986. The official blazon is "Gules, a plough Or" (Norwegian: I rødt en gull plog). This means the arms have a red field (background) and the charge is a plough. The plough has a tincture of Or which means it is commonly colored yellow, but if it is made out of metal, then gold is used. This symbolizes the fact that the main source of income in the municipality is agriculture. The plough also symbolizes that the municipality is at the northernmost limits of where grain can be grown (and ploughs used) in Norway. The arms were designed by Arvid Steen.

=== Churches ===
The Church of Norway has two parishes (sokn) within Balsfjord Municipality. It is part of the Indre Troms prosti (deanery) in the Diocese of Nord-Hålogaland.

Churches in Balsfjord Municipality
Parish (sokn)	Church name	Location of the church	Year built
Balsfjord	Balsfjord Church	Balsfjord	1856
Balsfjord	Nordkjosbotn Church	Nordkjosbotn	1987
Balsfjord	Storsteinnes Chapel	Storsteinnes	1968
Malangen	Malangen Church	Mortenhals	1853
Malangen	Mestervik Chapel	Mestervik	1968

== History ==
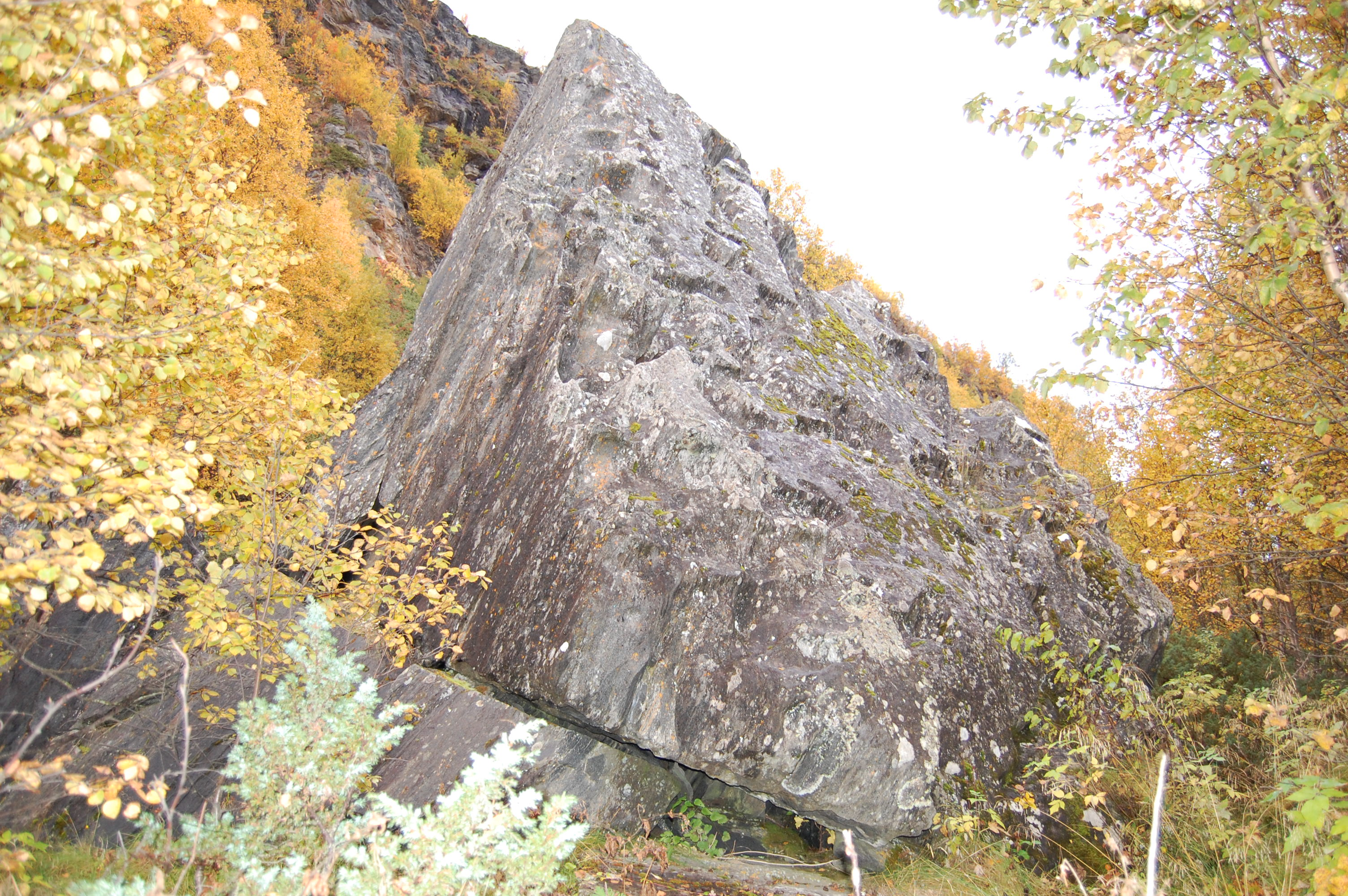
Stabben: A stone previously used as worship place by the Sami people. Located at Sand.

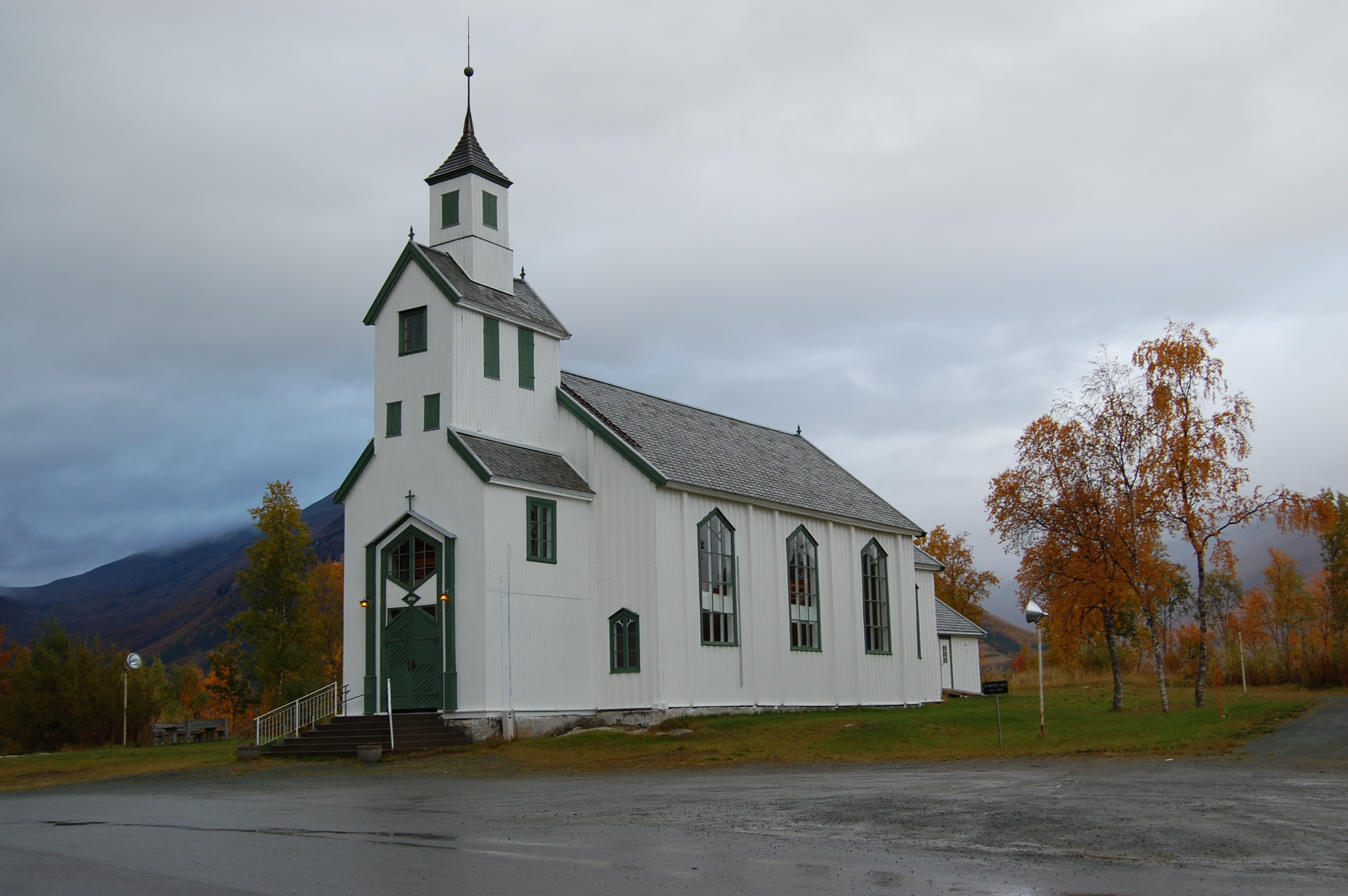
Balsfjord church.

The local inhabitants are descendants of a mixture of Norwegian, Sami and Kven people. Due to the assimilation processes carried out by the Norwegian government, today very few traces of Sami and Kven culture survive. From the 18th century until the 20th century, trappers from Balsfjord were active in the Arctic, hunting in areas from Greenland to Novaya Zemlya.

=== Mindekirken movement ===
According to the book Tromsø City History (Norwegian: Tromsø by Histori) written by Nils Andreas Ytreberg (1896–1987) (published in Norwegian), during the mid-19th century, Balsfjord became the religious home of a group of "mindekirken" or "freechurch dissenters" who split from the state church parish in Tromsø. The mindekirken movement in the Troms region was led by the seminary student, Johannes Andreas Johannessen Bomstad (born at Balsfjord on 23 August 1821), who split from the state church at the age of 28, under the leadership of the first Norwegian mindekirken movement leader, Rev. Lammers from Oslo. In 1856, Bomstad and his original followers established their own church which they called the "Free Apostolic Christian Church" in Balsfjord.

"Rev. Bomstad" and his followers were said to have struggled and protested against the Tromsø state church minister and the Troms Bishop's religious rulings, eventually leading to a riot in the town of Tromsø, when state-church members yelled at Bomstad and his fellow dissenters to "go back to Kautokeino (A small village in the most northern districts of Norway)". In 1862, Bomstad led a group of "mindekirken colonists" to America, traveling first to Bergen, where they sailed in mid-May 1862 aboard the Sleipner, arriving at the inland port of Chicago, Illinois on 2 August 1862. Their voyage was also noteworthy as the first transatlantic voyage sailing directly from Europe to the port of Chicago (other previous transoceanic ships disembarked first at Quebec City, Canada.) After arriving in Chicago, the mindekirken colonists traveled overland to the area of St. Peter, Minnesota, where they remained during the "Dakota War of 1862".

Rev. Bomstad left St. Peter traveling by mule to Kandiyohi County, Minnesota, where near the east bank of a lake (previously called "Lake Lillian"), he became the founding father of Lake Lillian, Minnesota in May 1864 (one hour ahead of the town's next settler, Mr. O.E. Hart, previously of New York). After staking his original claim, a month later on 3 June 1864, Rev. Bomstad led the rest of the colonists from St. Peter to their new settlement at Lake Lillian, where they built dugout shelters to live in that first year (on the site later occupied by the First M.E. Methodist Church of Lake Lillian.) A few months later he and his family finished building and moved into their log cabin home.

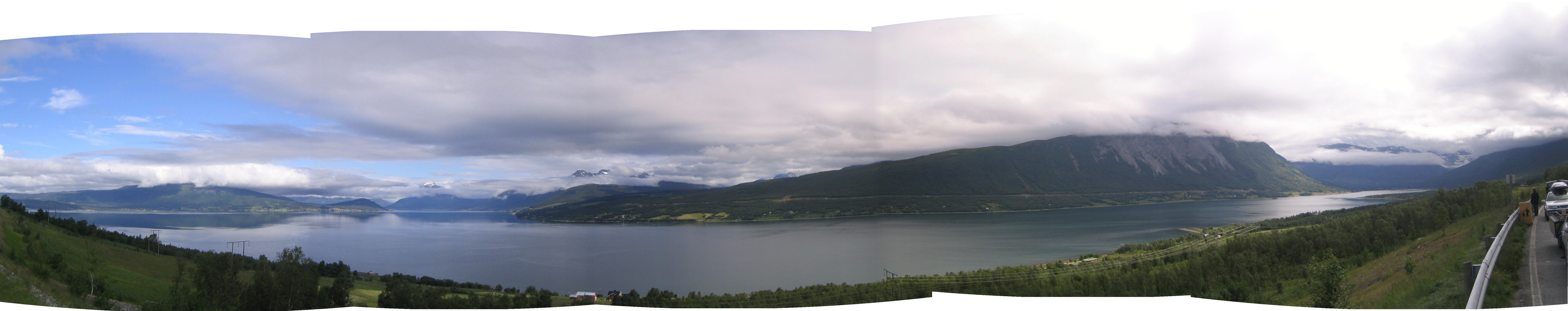
Balsfjord panorama

== Government ==
Balsfjord Municipality is responsible for primary education (through 10th grade), outpatient health services, senior citizen services, welfare and other social services, zoning, economic development, and municipal roads and utilities. The municipality is governed by a municipal council of directly elected representatives. The mayor is indirectly elected by a vote of the municipal council. The municipality is under the jurisdiction of the Nord-Troms og Senja District Court and the Hålogaland Court of Appeal.

=== Municipal council ===
The municipal council (Kommunestyre) of Balsfjord Municipality is made up of 19 representatives that are elected to four year terms. The tables below show the current and historical composition of the council by political party.

Balsfjord kommunestyre 2023–2027
Party name (in Norwegian)	Number of representatives
Labour Party (Arbeiderpartiet)	4
Progress Party (Fremskrittspartiet)	4
Conservative Party (Høyre)	5
Christian Democratic Party (Kristelig Folkeparti)	1
Centre Party (Senterpartiet)	4
Socialist Left Party (Sosialistisk Venstreparti)	1
Total number of members:	19

Balsfjord kommunestyre 2019–2023
Party name (in Norwegian)	Number of representatives
Labour Party (Arbeiderpartiet)	6
Progress Party (Fremskrittspartiet)	2
Conservative Party (Høyre)	4
Red Party (Rødt)	1
Centre Party (Senterpartiet)	6
Total number of members:	19

Balsfjord kommunestyre 2015–2019
Party name (in Norwegian)	Number of representatives
Labour Party (Arbeiderpartiet)	10
Progress Party (Fremskrittspartiet)	2
Conservative Party (Høyre)	3
Christian Democratic Party (Kristelig Folkeparti)	1
Centre Party (Senterpartiet)	3
Total number of members:	19

Balsfjord kommunestyre 2011–2015
Party name (in Norwegian)	Number of representatives
Labour Party (Arbeiderpartiet)	12
Progress Party (Fremskrittspartiet)	4
Conservative Party (Høyre)	6
Christian Democratic Party (Kristelig Folkeparti)	1
Centre Party (Senterpartiet)	3
Socialist Left Party (Sosialistisk Venstreparti)	1
Total number of members:	27

Balsfjord kommunestyre 2007–2011
Party name (in Norwegian)	Number of representatives
Labour Party (Arbeiderpartiet)	8
Progress Party (Fremskrittspartiet)	8
Conservative Party (Høyre)	3
Christian Democratic Party (Kristelig Folkeparti)	2
Centre Party (Senterpartiet)	5
Socialist Left Party (Sosialistisk Venstreparti)	1
Total number of members:	27

Balsfjord kommunestyre 2003–2007
Party name (in Norwegian)	Number of representatives
Labour Party (Arbeiderpartiet)	9
Progress Party (Fremskrittspartiet)	4
Conservative Party (Høyre)	2
Christian Democratic Party (Kristelig Folkeparti)	2
Centre Party (Senterpartiet)	5
Socialist Left Party (Sosialistisk Venstreparti)	2
Joint list of the Coastal Party (Kystpartiet) and Liberal Party (Venstre)	3
Total number of members:	27

Balsfjord kommunestyre 1999–2003
Party name (in Norwegian)	Number of representatives
Labour Party (Arbeiderpartiet)	8
Progress Party (Fremskrittspartiet)	3
Conservative Party (Høyre)	4
Christian Democratic Party (Kristelig Folkeparti)	3
Centre Party (Senterpartiet)	6
Socialist Left Party (Sosialistisk Venstreparti)	1
Liberal Party (Venstre)	2
Total number of members:	27

Balsfjord kommunestyre 1995–1999
Party name (in Norwegian)	Number of representatives
Labour Party (Arbeiderpartiet)	14
Progress Party (Fremskrittspartiet)	3
Conservative Party (Høyre)	2
Christian Democratic Party (Kristelig Folkeparti)	2
Centre Party (Senterpartiet)	11
Socialist Left Party (Sosialistisk Venstreparti)	2
Liberal Party (Venstre)	3
Total number of members:	37

Balsfjord kommunestyre 1991–1995
Party name (in Norwegian)	Number of representatives
Labour Party (Arbeiderpartiet)	11
Progress Party (Fremskrittspartiet)	2
Conservative Party (Høyre)	3
Christian Democratic Party (Kristelig Folkeparti)	2
Red Electoral Alliance (Rød Valgallianse)	1
Centre Party (Senterpartiet)	6
Socialist Left Party (Sosialistisk Venstreparti)	3
Liberal Party (Venstre)	1
Total number of members:	29

Balsfjord kommunestyre 1987–1991
Party name (in Norwegian)	Number of representatives
Labour Party (Arbeiderpartiet)	16
Conservative Party (Høyre)	6
Christian Democratic Party (Kristelig Folkeparti)	2
Red Electoral Alliance (Rød Valgallianse)	1
Centre Party (Senterpartiet)	5
Socialist Left Party (Sosialistisk Venstreparti)	4
Liberal Party (Venstre)	3
Total number of members:	37

Balsfjord kommunestyre 1983–1987
Party name (in Norwegian)	Number of representatives
Labour Party (Arbeiderpartiet)	18
Conservative Party (Høyre)	5
Christian Democratic Party (Kristelig Folkeparti)	2
Centre Party (Senterpartiet)	4
Liberal Party (Venstre)	1
Joint list of the Socialist Left Party (Sosialistisk Venstreparti) and the Communist Party (Kommunistiske Parti)	4
District list for Malangen (Distriktsliste for Malangen)	3
Total number of members:	37

Balsfjord kommunestyre 1979–1983
Party name (in Norwegian)	Number of representatives
Labour Party (Arbeiderpartiet)	16
Conservative Party (Høyre)	7
Christian Democratic Party (Kristelig Folkeparti)	4
Centre Party (Senterpartiet)	6
Liberal Party (Venstre)	2
Joint list of the Socialist Left Party (Sosialistisk Venstreparti) and the Communist Party (Kommunistiske Parti)	2
Total number of members:	37

Balsfjord kommunestyre 1975–1979
Party name (in Norwegian)	Number of representatives
Labour Party (Arbeiderpartiet)	15
Christian Democratic Party (Kristelig Folkeparti)	6
Centre Party (Senterpartiet)	11
Socialist Left Party (Sosialistisk Venstreparti)	2
Liberal Party (Venstre)	3
Total number of members:	37

Balsfjord kommunestyre 1971–1975
Party name (in Norwegian)	Number of representatives
Labour Party (Arbeiderpartiet)	19
Centre Party (Senterpartiet)	8
Liberal Party (Venstre)	4
Local List(s) (Lokale lister)	6
Total number of members:	37

Balsfjord kommunestyre 1967–1971
Party name (in Norwegian)	Number of representatives
Labour Party (Arbeiderpartiet)	20
Centre Party (Senterpartiet)	8
Liberal Party (Venstre)	6
Local List(s) (Lokale lister)	3
Total number of members:	37

Balsfjord kommunestyre 1963–1967
Party name (in Norwegian)	Number of representatives
Labour Party (Arbeiderpartiet)	20
Communist Party (Kommunistiske Parti)	1
Centre Party (Senterpartiet)	6
Liberal Party (Venstre)	5
Local List(s) (Lokale lister)	5
Total number of members:	37

Balsfjord herredsstyre 1959–1963
Party name (in Norwegian)	Number of representatives
Labour Party (Arbeiderpartiet)	15
Communist Party (Kommunistiske Parti)	1
Liberal Party (Venstre)	3
Joint List(s) of Non-Socialist Parties (Borgerlige Felleslister)	10
Total number of members:	29

Balsfjord herredsstyre 1955–1959
Party name (in Norwegian)	Number of representatives
Labour Party (Arbeiderpartiet)	17
Communist Party (Kommunistiske Parti)	2
Liberal Party (Venstre)	2
List of workers, fishermen, and small farmholders (Arbeidere, fiskere, småbrukere liste)	5
Local List(s) (Lokale lister)	3
Total number of members:	29

Balsfjord herredsstyre 1951–1955
Party name (in Norwegian)	Number of representatives
Labour Party (Arbeiderpartiet)	9
Communist Party (Kommunistiske Parti)	2
Joint List(s) of Non-Socialist Parties (Borgerlige Felleslister)	9
Total number of members:	20

Balsfjord herredsstyre 1947–1951
Party name (in Norwegian)	Number of representatives
Labour Party (Arbeiderpartiet)	10
Communist Party (Kommunistiske Parti)	2
Joint List(s) of Non-Socialist Parties (Borgerlige Felleslister)	8
Total number of members:	20

Balsfjord herredsstyre 1945–1947
Party name (in Norwegian)	Number of representatives
Labour Party (Arbeiderpartiet)	10
Communist Party (Kommunistiske Parti)	4
Local List(s) (Lokale lister)	6
Total number of members:	20

Balsfjord herredsstyre 1937–1941*
Party name (in Norwegian)	Number of representatives
Labour Party (Arbeiderpartiet)	10
Communist Party (Kommunistiske Parti)	1
Joint List(s) of Non-Socialist Parties (Borgerlige Felleslister)	9
Total number of members:	20
Note: Due to the German occupation of Norway during World War II, no elections were held for new municipal councils until after the war ended in 1945.

=== Mayors ===
The mayor (Norwegian: ordfører) of Balsfjord Municipality is the political leader of the municipality and the chairperson of the municipal council. Here is a list of people who have held this position:

- 1860–1862: H.A. Moursund
- 1863–1870: D. Bruun
- 1871–1874: J.R. Nilsen
- 1875–1878: A.O. Daae
- 1879–1882: J.R. Nilsen
- 1883–1892: Ole O. Hansvold
- 1893–1894: J.R. Nilsen
- 1895–1901: Peter A. Larsen
- 1902–1903: G.O. Kløvstad
- 1903–1910: Andreas Iversen
- 1910–1913: Mads Kvien (V)
- 1914–1917: Johannes Eide
- 1917–1919: Alf B. Bastiansen
- 1919–1919: Hans Abrahamsen
- 1920–1926: C.J. Corneliussen
- 1926–1928: Peter A. Larsen
- 1929–1934: Nik. Heim (Ap)
- 1934–1940: Lars Fause (Ap)
- 1941–1944: John Gerhard Rønne (NS)
- 1945–1946: Lars Fause (Ap)
- 1946–1951: Emil Nymoen (Ap)
- 1952–1961: Magne Sagelv (Ap)
- 1962–1969: Asbjørn Sjøthun (Ap)
- 1970–1975: Alfred Sagelvmo (Ap)
- 1975–1979: Rolf Sand (Sp)
- 1979–1983: Sverre Ola Aarøen (H)
- 1983–1991: Olav Åsheim (Ap)
- 1991–1995: Kåre Kristiansen (Sp)
- 1995–1999: Eva Johnsen (Ap)
- 1999–2003: Oddvar Kåre Skogli (Ap)
- 2003–2011: Gunda Johansen (Ap)
- 2011–2015: Ole-Johan Rødvei (H)
- 2015–2023: Gunda Johansen (Ap)
- 2023–present: Laila Monica Johannessen (Sp)

== Geography ==
The highest point in the municipality is the 1,587-metre (5,207 ft) tall mountain Vassdalsfjellet.

== Climate ==
Climate data for Storsteinnes
Month	Jan	Feb	Mar	Apr	May	Jun	Jul	Aug	Sep	Oct	Nov	Dec	Year
Daily mean °C (°F)	−6.5 (20.3)	−6.0 (21.2)	−3.4 (25.9)	0.5 (32.9)	5.5 (41.9)	10.4 (50.7)	12.8 (55.0)	11.6 (52.9)	6.9 (44.4)	2.3 (36.1)	−2.7 (27.1)	−5.2 (22.6)	2.2 (36.0)
Average precipitation mm (inches)	71 (2.8)	67 (2.6)	48 (1.9)	45 (1.8)	34 (1.3)	50 (2.0)	67 (2.6)	68 (2.7)	74 (2.9)	94 (3.7)	75 (3.0)	75 (3.0)	768 (30.2)
Average precipitation days (≥ 1 mm)	10.4	10.6	8.8	9.1	7.6	9.6	12.7	12.4	13.1	13.4	12.3	12.0	132.0
Source: Norwegian Meteorological Institute

== Economy ==
Farming is the single most important industry, although there is also some manufacturing. The Tine dairy factory at Storsteinnes is one of the largest producers of the Norwegian brown cheese (brunost). They also make their own brand of cheese, called Balsfjord, from goat's milk.

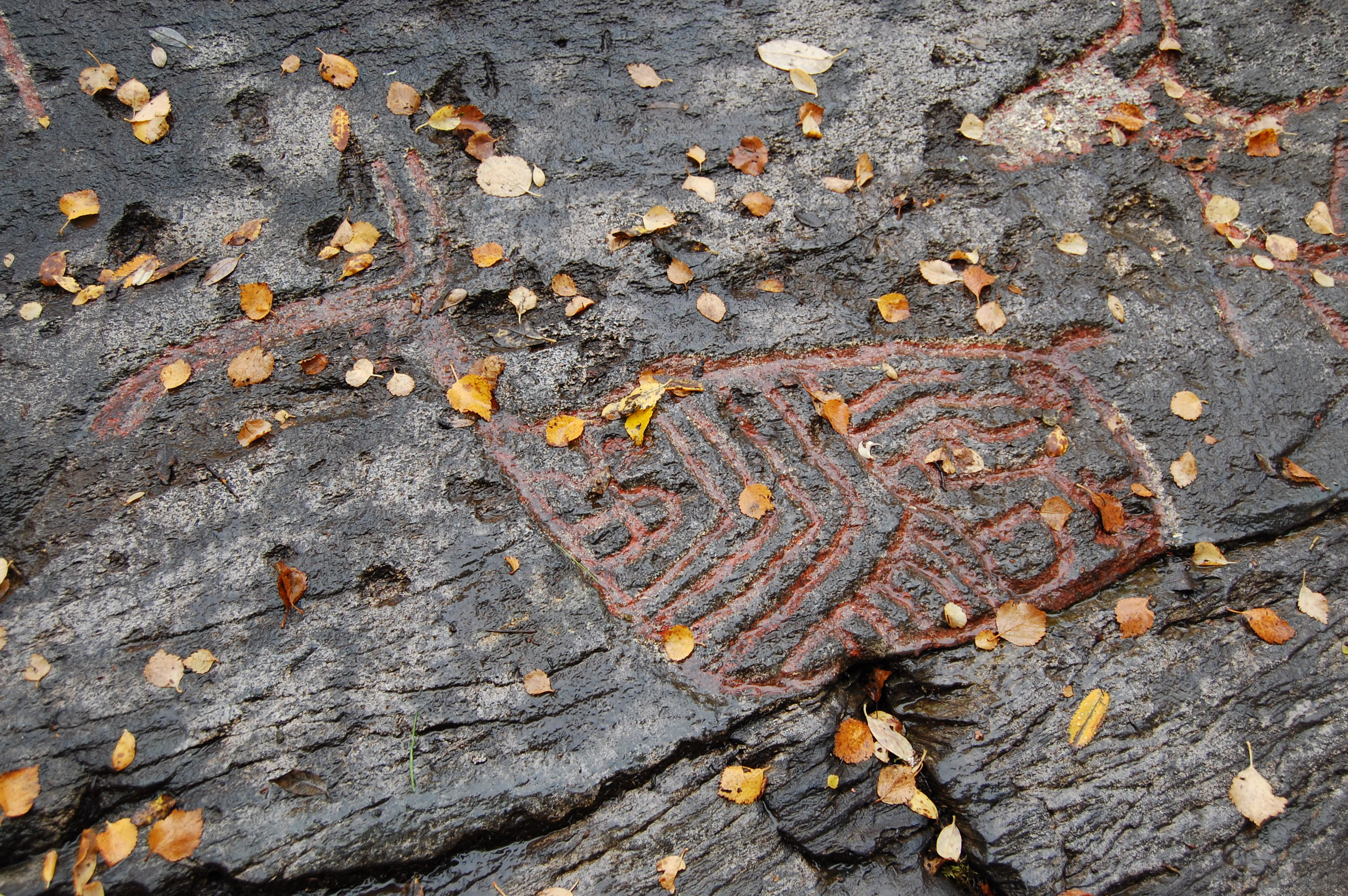
Bukkhammeren: rock carving from 4600 BCE at Tennes.

== Transportation ==
European route E6 and European route E8 meet at the village of Nordkjosbotn, making it a major crossroad.

== Attractions ==
Apart from the impressive scenery, attractions include the 6000-year-old rock carvings at Tennes (close to the Balsfjord Church), the old trading centre of Nordby, a Sami camp at Heia open over the summer months and the 18th century sawmill at Aursfjord. There is also a smaller field of rock carvings at Åsli. The Malangen Brygger resort on the water's edge has opened on the Malangen Peninsula and will expand further in May 2010 when a hotel and conference centre open.

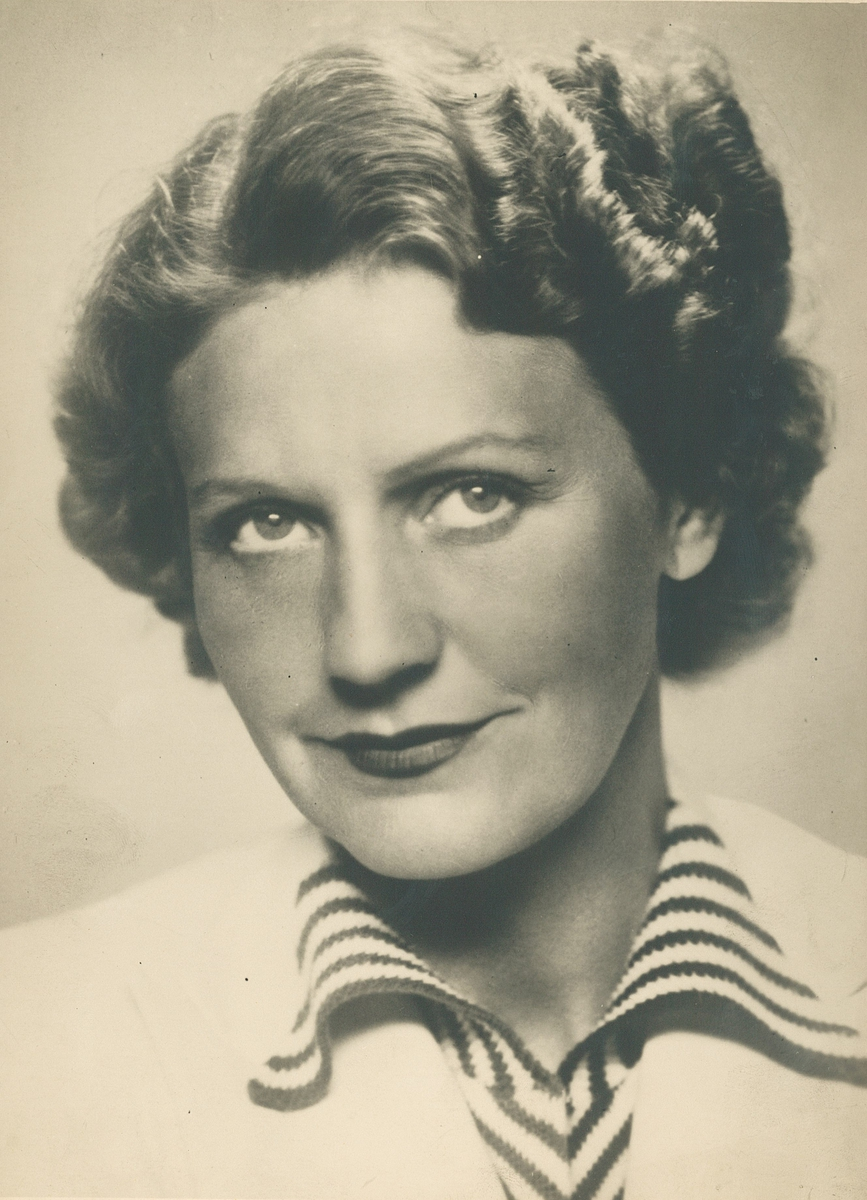
Lillemor von Hanno, 1935

== Notable people ==
Notable people that were born or lived in Balsfjord include:

- Andreas Beck (1864 in Balsfjord – 1914), a seal-hunter, polar captain, ice captain, shipowner, and explorer
- Lillemor von Hanno (1900 in Balsfjord – 1984), an actress, novelist, and playwright
- Sverre Heim (born 1951 in Balsfjord), a physician, cancer researcher, and chess player
- Gunda Johansen (born 1952), a politician who was mayor of Balsfjord municipality starting in 2003
- Kent-Are Antonsen (born 1995 in Storsteinnes), a footballer who played 180 games for Tromsø
