= European route E8 =

Road in trans-European E-road network

E8

Route information
- Length: 1,410 km (880 mi)

Major junctions
- North end: Tromsø, Norway
- South end: Turku, Finland

Location
- Countries: Norway, Finland

Highway system
- International E-road network; A Class; B Class

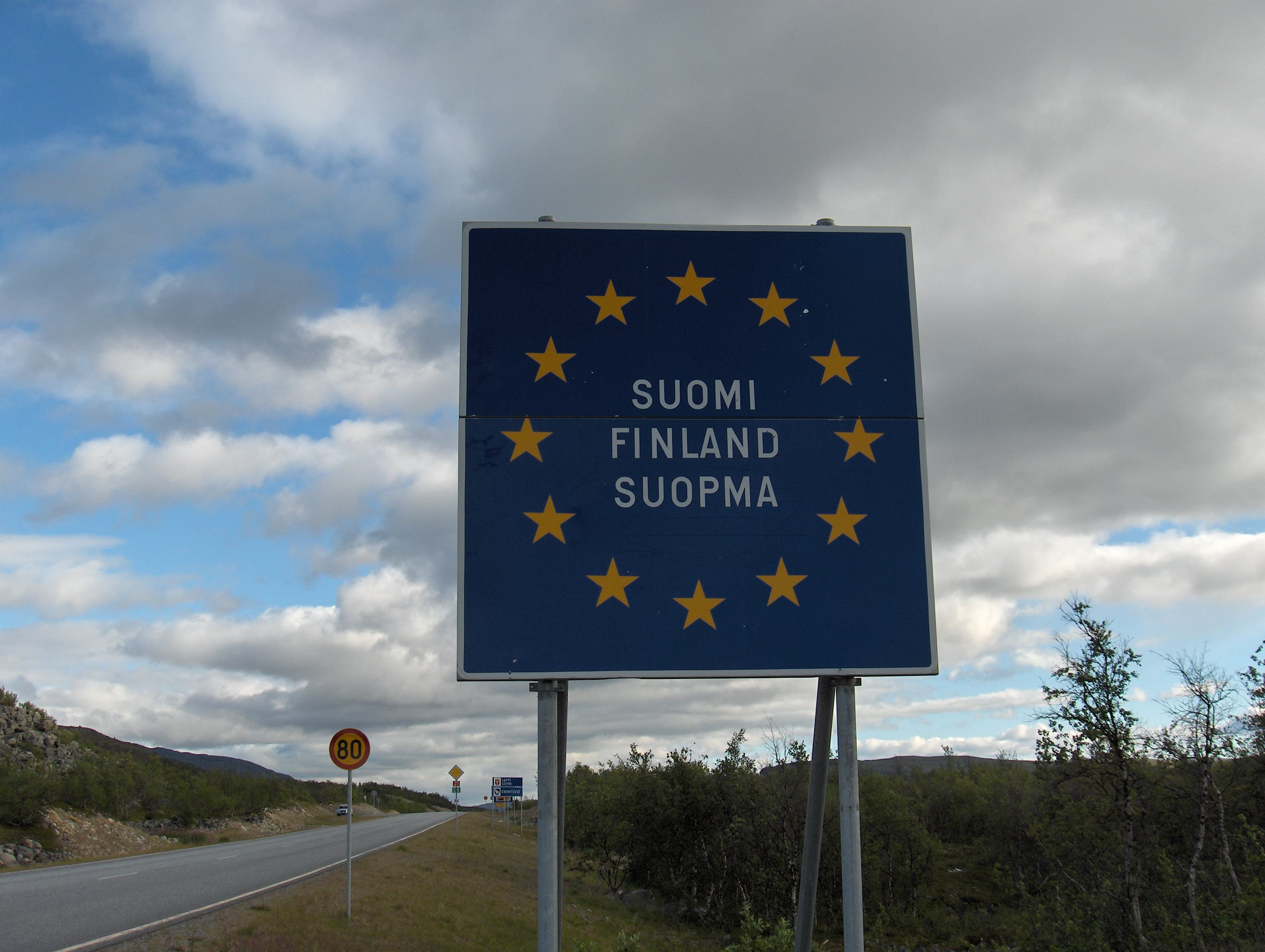
Finnish border sign on the E 8 road at Kilpisjärvi (in Finnish, Swedish and Northern Sami)

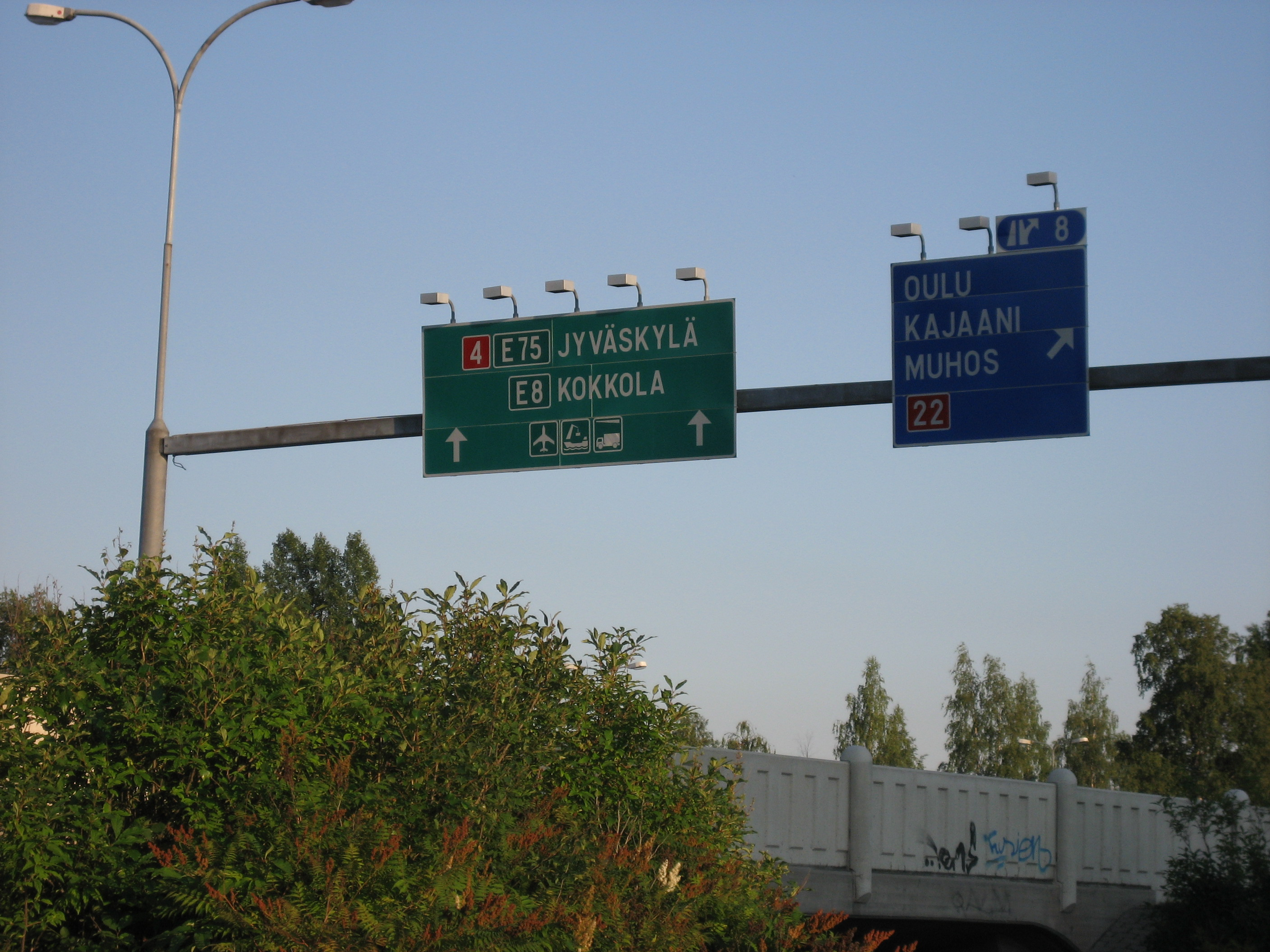
Road sign above the E75/E8/road 4 near Oulu

The European route E8 is a European route that runs between Tromsø, Norway and Turku, Finland. The length of the route is 1,410 kilometres (880 mi).

== History ==
In the older E-road system that was used from 1950 to 1985 (in the Nordic countries until 1992), the E8 went London – Colchester – Harwich – ferry connection – Hook of Holland – The Hague – Utrecht – Oeynhausen – Hanover – Berlin – Poznań – Krośniewice – Łowicz – Warsaw – USSR border (Brest). It connected with E1, E2, E5, E31, E107, E108 and E113 routes.

The current E8 route was introduced in early 1990s between Tromsø and Tornio and extended from Tornio to Turku in 2001. In the older E road system it had been called E78 since 1962.

== Route ==
- Norway
  - E8: Tromsøya - Nordkjosbotn ( E6) - Skibotn ( E6)
- Finland
  - Vt 21: Kilpisjärvi - Karesuvanto ( E45) - Tornio ( E4)
  - Vt 29: Tornio ( E4) - Kemi ( E75)
  - Vt 4: Kemi ( E75) - Oulu ( E75)
  - Vt 8: Oulu ( E75) - Vaasa ( E12) - Pori - Turku ( E18 E63)
