= Storsteinnes =

Village in Balsfjord Municipality, Norway

Storsteinnes (Norwegian); Eljasnjárga (Northern Sami)
- Village
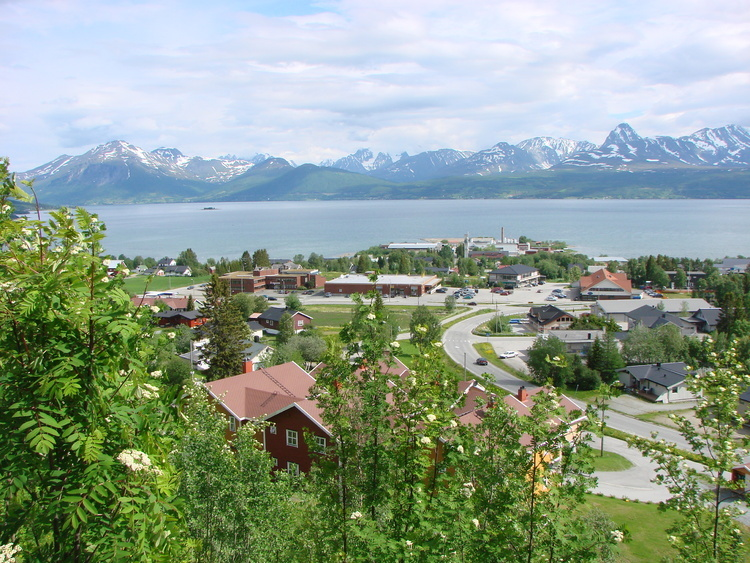
- View of the village
- Interactive map of: Storsteinnes (Norwegian); Eljasnjárga (Northern Sami)
- Location within Troms Location within Norway
- Coordinates: 69.2407°N 19.2345°E
- Country: Norway
- Region: Northern Norway
- County: Troms
- District: Hålogaland
- Municipality: Balsfjord Municipality

Area
  - Total: 1.2 km^{2} (0.46 sq mi)
- Elevation: 8 m (26 ft)

Population (2023)
  - Total: 1,107
  - Density: 923/km^{2} (2,390/sq mi)
- Time zone: UTC+01:00 (CET)
  - Summer (DST): UTC+02:00 (CEST)
- Post Code: 9050 Storsteinnes

Storsteinnes (Norwegian) or Eljasnjárga (Northern Sami) is the administrative center of Balsfjord Municipality in Troms county, Norway. The 1.2-square-kilometre (300-acre) village has a population (2023) of 1,107 and a population density of 923 inhabitants per square kilometre (2,390/sq mi). This makes it the largest urban area in the municipality. Storsteinnes Chapel is located in this village.

== Location ==
Storsteinnes is located at the southern end of the Sørkjosen, which is a branch of the main Balsfjorden. The European route E6 highway formerly passed through the central part of the village, but the highway was rebuilt and moved. It now passes about 4 kilometres (2.5 mi) southeast of the village center. The Sagelv river runs through the village and Josefvatnet lake is located 2.5 km (1.6 mi) to the northwest of the village. The village of Nordkjosbotn is about 14 kilometres (8.7 mi) to the east of Storsteinnes.

== Economy ==
Most of the economy of Storsteinnes involves municipal services, but agriculture is also important. Tine runs a dairy in Storsteinnes, which is one of Norway's largest producers of Brunost. They also produce a special kind of goat milk cheese called Balsfjordost.
