= Balsfjord Church =

- Balsfjord kirke
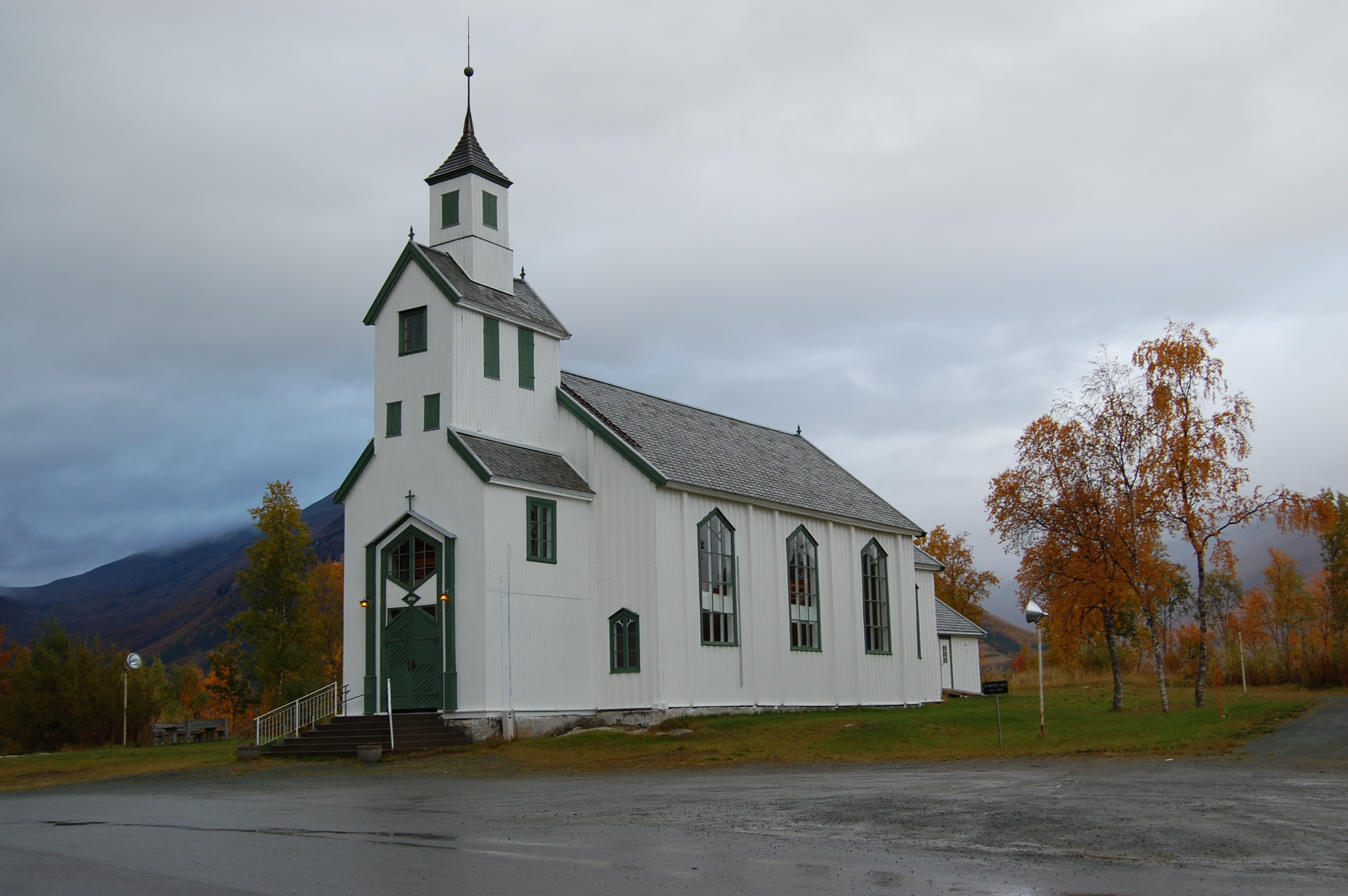
- View of the church
- Balsfjord Church
- 69.311207°N 19.346637°E
- Location: Balsfjord Municipality, Troms
- Country: Norway
- Denomination: Church of Norway
- Churchmanship: Evangelical Lutheran

History
- Status: Parish church
- Founded: 1856
- Consecrated: 19 Oct 1856

Architecture
- Functional status: Active
- Architect: Christian Heinrich Grosch
- Architectural type: Long church
- Completed: 1856 (170 years ago)

Specifications
- Capacity: 400
- Materials: Wood

Administration
- Diocese: Nord-Hålogaland
- Deanery: Senja prosti
- Parish: Balsfjord
- Norwegian Cultural Heritage Site
- Type: Church
- Status: Listed
- ID: 83848

Balsfjord Church (Norwegian: Balsfjord kirke) is a parish church of the Church of Norway in Balsfjord Municipality in Troms county, Norway. It is located at Balsfjord, just north of the village of Tennes. It is one of the churches for the Balsfjord parish which is part of the Senja prosti (deanery) in the Diocese of Nord-Hålogaland. The white, wooden church was built in a long church style in 1856 using plans drawn up by the architect Christian Heinrich Grosch. The church seats about 400 people.

== Media gallery ==
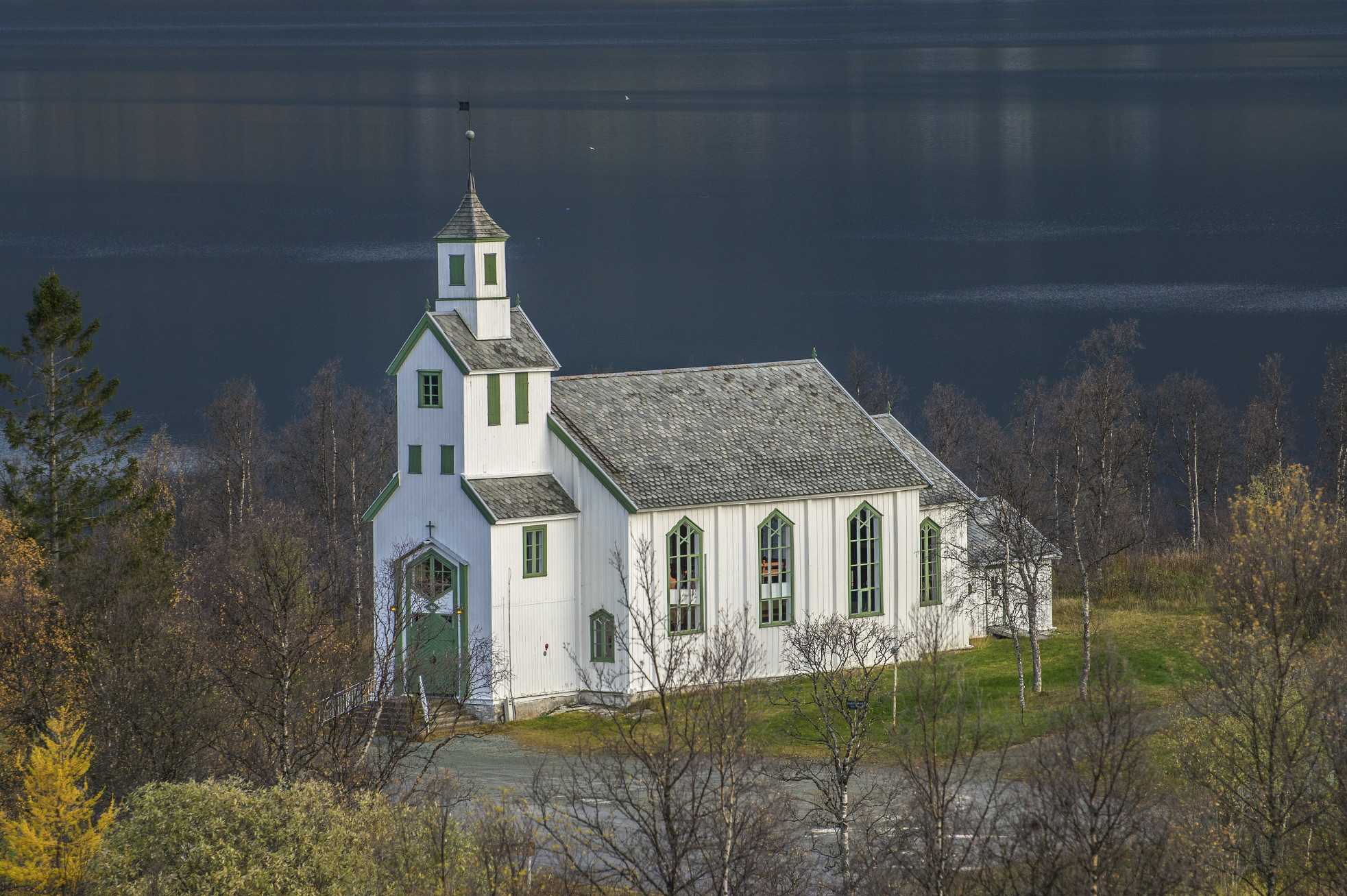
Balsfjord Church in October 2015

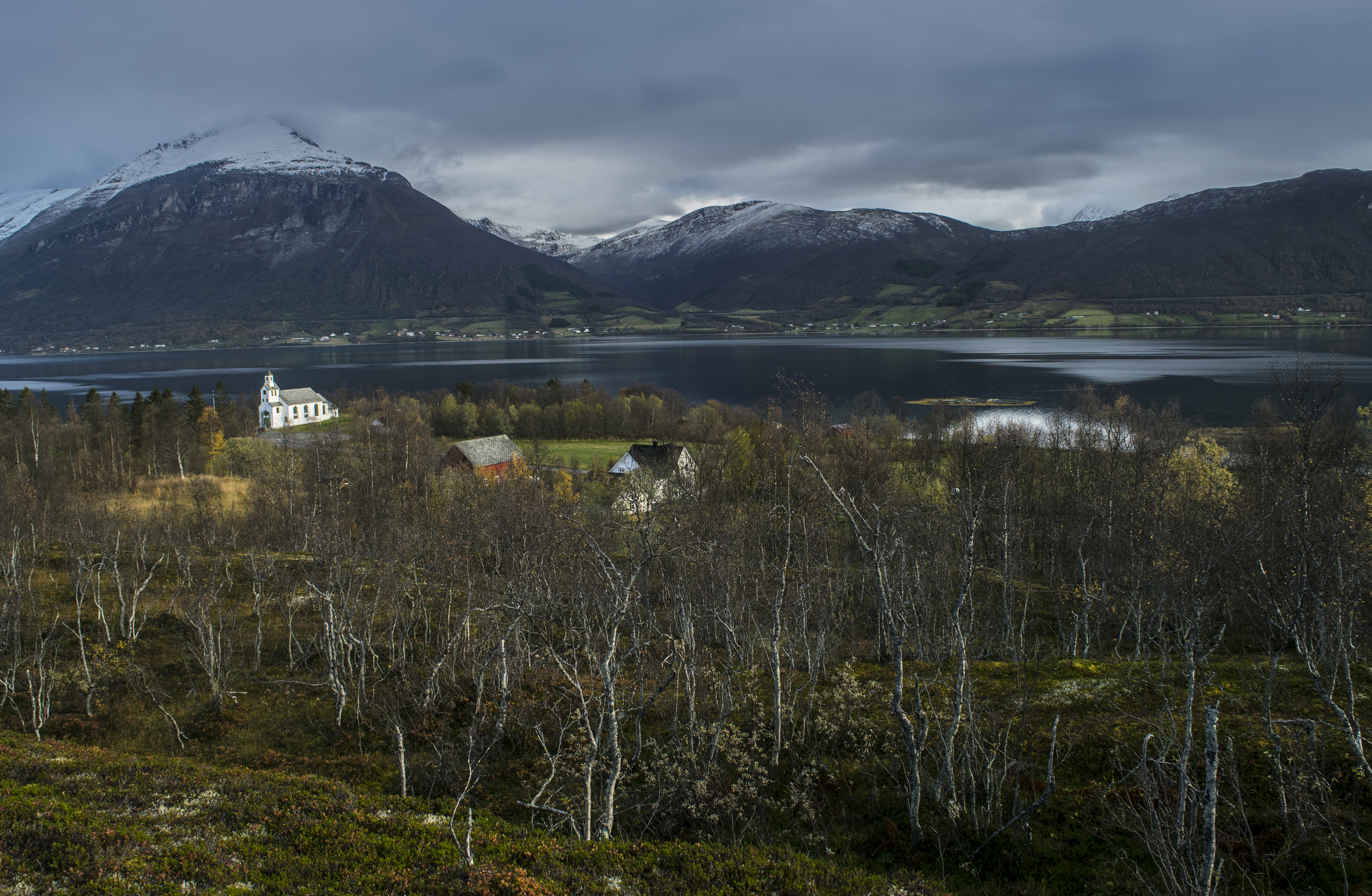
Balsfjord Church and nearby environment in October 2015

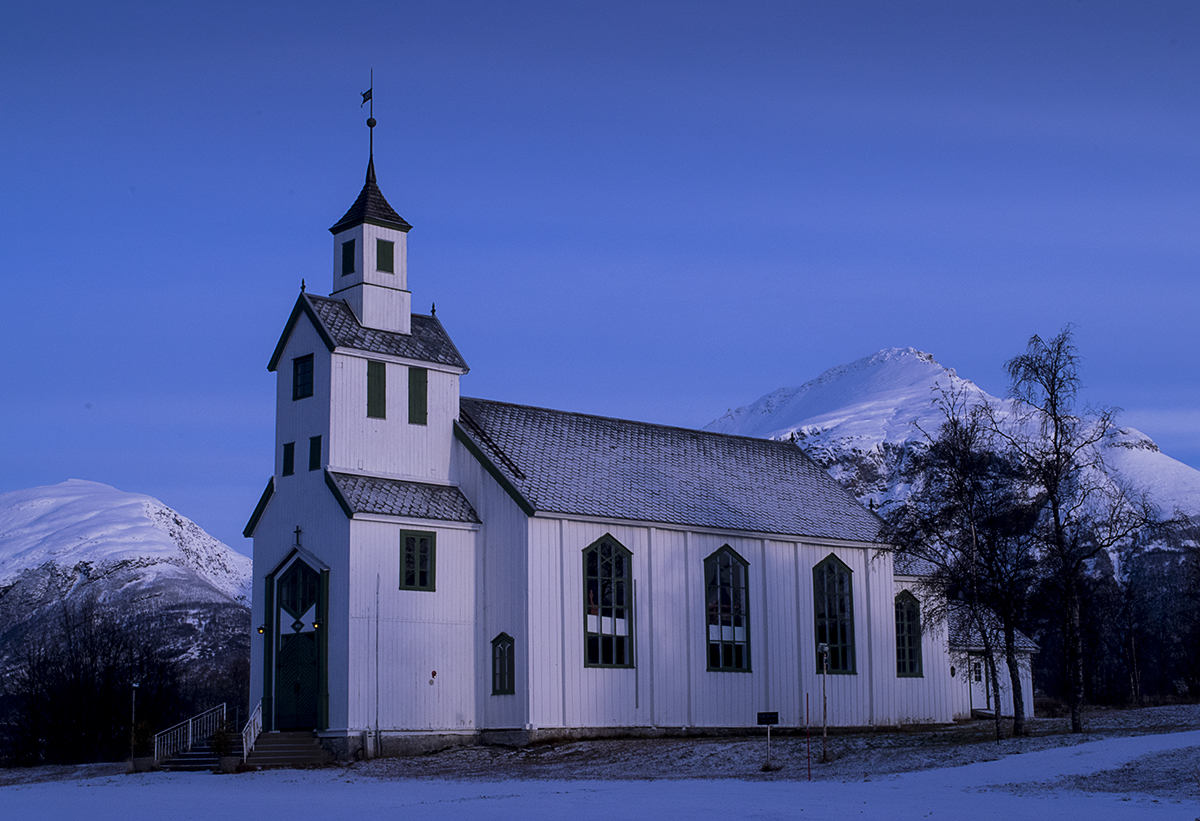
Balsfjord Church and in November 2014

== See also ==
- List of churches in Nord-Hålogaland
