= Storfjorden =

Storfjorden or Storfjord (meaning "big fjord" in Norwegian) may refer to several places in Norway:

== Fjords ==
- Storfjorden (Sunnmøre), a fjord in the Sunnmøre district of Møre og Romsdal county
- Storfjorden (Svalbard), a body of water separating Spitsbergen from Barentsøya and Edgeøya in Svalbard
- Storfjorden, Troms, a branch off the main Lyngen fjord in Troms county
- Storfjorden (Gloppen), a lake in Gloppen Municipality, Vestland county
- Storfjorden, a branch off the main Velfjorden in Brønnøy municipality, Nordland county
- Storfjorden, a branch off the main Laksefjorden in Lebesby municipality, Finnmark county
- Storfjorden, the innermost part of the Hjørundfjorden in Ørsta municipality, Møre og Romsdal county

== Other places ==
- Storfjord Municipality, a municipality in Troms county
- Storfjord Bridge, a proposed suspension bridge that would span Storfjorden in Sunnmøre, Norway
- Storfjord Church, a church in Storfjord municipality, Troms county
- Storfjord Station, a former hunting and radio station in East Greenland
