= Bente Pedersen =

Norwegian novelist (born 1961)

Bente Pedersen (born 22 March 1961) is a Norwegian novelist. She was born in Skibotn. She has written many historical novels, for example Raija (40 volumes), Rosa (35 volumes), Sara (6 volumes), Liljene (3 volumes) and Huset arent (21 volumes). Pedersen has also written many individual books:

- Mannen som fløy (1999)
- Vi står han av (2004)
- Best uten ball? (2005)
