= Best Explorer =

Italian sailboat protagonist

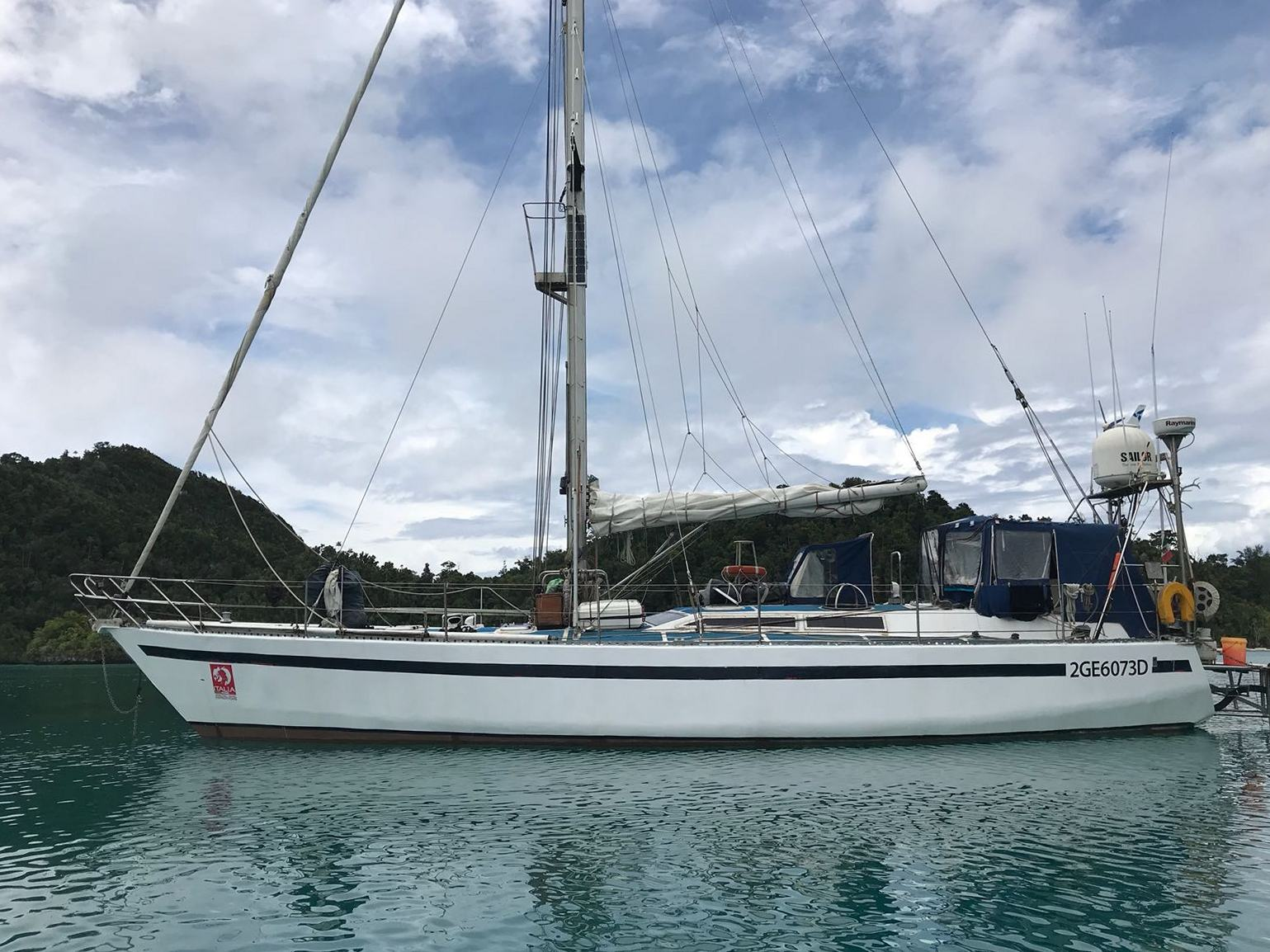
- Best Explorer anchored in Raja Ampat Indonesia 2018

History

Italy
- Name: Best Explorer
- Builder: Cantiere CND, (Milan)
- Launched: 15 September 1965
- Christened: Bestiaccia
- Renamed: Best Explorer 2007
- Home port: Santa Margerita Ligure (Genoa)
- Identification: MMSI number: 247049530

General characteristics
- Type: Cutter
- Tonnage: 24.67 t (24.28 long tons) gross tonnage
- Length: 17.00 m (55 ft 9 in) LOA; 15.17 m (49 ft 9 in) RL
- Beam: 4.57 m (15 ft 0 in)
- Height: 20.00 m (65 ft 7 in) mainmast
- Draught: 1.45 m (4 ft 9 in) keel up; 3.00 m (9 ft 10 in) keel down
- Propulsion: 1 × diesel engine SOLÉ 69.94 kW (93.79 bhp)
- Sail plan: Sail surface: 181 m^{2} (1,950 sq ft)
- Speed: 7 knots (13 km/h; 8.1 mph) by engine prop
- Range: 1,500 nmi (2,800 km; 1,700 mi) at 7 knots (13 km/h; 8.1 mph) (on engine prop)

Best Explorer was an Italian sailboat protagonist of exceptional navigation around the world, especially in the Arctic Ocean.

The boat was built with the intention that it would be used to sail around the world, but for the first twenty years, Best Explorer remained in the Mediterranean. Then, having changed ownership, she put to sea for her intended destination, this time through absolutely unusual routes, breaking several records. Once around the world, she did not stop and continued to sail in Scandinavia, where she is now.

== The project ==
=== Hull ===
The boat was designed by the Giorgetti and Magrini studio on the basis of the "Best 51'" series project and was built in the CND shipyard in Milan, which no longer exists.

She is a Marconi-rigged cutter-rigged sailboat with a steel hull and deck. The mast is made of aluminum 20 m high. on the surface of the water. The boat is 15.17 m long. which, with the stern platform, become 16.50 m. The displacement is about 25 t. at full load and the tonnage is 24.67 t. The width is 4.57 m. The draft varies from 1.40 m. at 3.00 m. due to the moving keel, a particularly relevant feature.

Inside she hosts five cabins, one quadruple forward, two doubles in the center and two doubles aft for up to 12 people. The facilities consist of three toilets with shower and hot and cold water and electric WC and a kitchenette with a four-burner stove and home-type propane oven with 12V power supply. Two sinks with fresh and sea water and two refrigerators/freezers.

On board there are two life rafts for all the people on board, spare parts for most of the equipment and work tools to satisfy almost an entire workshop, as well as all the nautical and logistic material necessary to face long voyages independently .

=== Propulsion ===
She has a maximum sail rig of 181 m². The working one consists of a 35 m² mainsail, 10.5 ounces, a 64 m² yankee 5 ounces and a 22 m² . 6 ounce foremast. In addition to the sails, a diesel engine aspirated Solé SM-105 of 95 hp. and 6 cylinders that allows a cruising speed of about 7 knots and a 15 HP outboard for tenders.

== History ==
The name of the Best Explorer refers to the project series: "Best 51'". The original name was Bestiaccia, always with the same derivation. Launched in 1984, it used for whale watching in the Mediterranean Sea until 2006.

=== 2007 - From the Mediterranean to Norway ===
In 2007, Best Explorer underwent an overhaul and renewal, with the replacement of the bow plates with stainless steel, interior renovation, installation of a diesel stove and the replacement of all navigation instruments. The communication equipment was renewed and a roll bar was installed at the stern.

On July 1, 2007, under the command of Skipper Nanni (Giovanni) Acquarone, who remained in command of the boat in all subsequent voyages, the boat sailed from Imperia to Tromsø, Norway.

The route took her through four stages: Sóller in the Balearics, Cartagena in Spain, Gibraltar, Arklow and Dún Laoghaire in Ireland, Craobh Haven in Scotland, Stornoway in the Hebrides, Tórshavn in the Faeroes, Reykjavik, Olafsvik and Ísafjörður in Iceland, the remote island of Jan Mayen and Harstad in Norway with a route of more than 5,000 nautical miles.

=== 2008-2011 - Svalbard Islands ===
In the following years Best Explorer sailed along the Norwegian coast north of the Arctic Circle, but especially to the Svalbard Islands, where the crew became familiar with the far north, touching the latitude of 80°47' and among both the sea (pack) and the glacier ice.

After the years spent in Svalbard in 2010 it was decided to change the navigation area and visit Baja California, British Columbia and Alaska.

The route to reach this last destination through the Panama Canal turns out to be about 13,000 nautical miles against the 8,000 of the route through the Arctic, although much more challenging. Careful research made it clear that that route had not yet been crossed by any Italian boat.

Once the decision was made to follow it, an Association was created for the occasion named Arctic Sail Expeditions - Italy and the long preparation necessary was begun, which was completed in the spring of 2012.

=== 2012 - The Northwest Passage After the replacement of the original engine by now less reliable and the renewal of the A100 class certification, the boat embarked on the challenging navigation of the Northwest Passage, with a route of 8,181 nautical miles sailed in 140 days.

On June 1, 2012, she sailed from Tromsø to the fishing port of King Cove, Alaska, on October 13, 2012 with a total crew of 21 different people for each leg.

On land in Italy and Norway several members of the Association took turns to support the needs of navigation from the support base. Since then and in all subsequent navigations at least one member of the Association is available as a "ground team" (Shore Team).

The stops were in Reykjavik (Iceland), Nuuk and Upernavik (Greenland), Pond Inlet and Gjoa Haven (Nunavut - Canada), Tuktoyaktuk (North West Territories - Canada) and Nome (Alaska).

On the leg from Pond Inlet to Gjoa Haven, the boat was repeatedly surrounded by moving ice. The precise position of the ice was also little known for the difficulty of communication with the "land team".

The situation became critical on a couple of occasions forcing the crew to long and tortuous detours between the narrow and dangerous passages between the drifting ice sheets.

It was the first sailing of an Italian boat and skipper and crew on this route.

Acquarone, Magri, Giovanni, Salvatore (2017). Senza Bussola fra i Ghiacci, Avventura nell'Artico. Milano: Mursia. ISBN 97-88-8425583-9-2.

=== 2013-2014 – The American coast ===
The long-planned program after moving to the Pacific, which had unexpectedly taken the Northwest Passage route instead of the Panama Canal route, was to visit Alaska, British Columbia and Baja California.

The "descent" along America took two years, with an intermediate winter stop at Canoe Cove, Vancouver Island and ending in Guaymas, Sonora, Mexico.

In spring and summer 2014 Best Explorer visited much of the Baja California Peninsula and Cortez Sea (or Gulf of California) locations.

=== 2015 - From Mexico to Tahiti ===
The route of about 8,000 nautical miles touched the Galapagos Islands, where it remained for two months, the Marquesas Islands remaining there for more than a month and the Tuamotu, mainly.under sail. Best Explorer then visited Tahiti, Moorea and other Society islands including Raiatea and Bora Bora.

=== 2016 - From Tahiti to Australia ===
In this navigation comparable in length to the previous one, she touched Maupihaa, Rarotonga and Palmerston, in the Cook Islands, the submerged atoll of Beveridge Reef, the island-state of Niuè, the Tonga Islands, the Fiji Islands, the Vanuatu Islands and New Caledonia, with arrival and winter stop in Bundaberg, Queensland, Australia.

=== 2017-2018 – From Australia to Japan ===
After an extensive overhaul in Australia, mainly with the replacement of the rigging and the hydraulic piston for the lift keel, the boat touched Sorong in Papua Barat, where it remained for the winter, Ternate in Muluku and Bitung in Sulawesi (Indonesia), then Cebu and Subic Bay (Philippines)finally, Naha, Okinawa, Kagoshima, Kyūshū, Nagoya and Osaka, Honshū (Japan), where the boat sustained without damage the passage of typhoon Jebi.

=== 2019 – From Japan to Tromsø via the Northern Sea Route ===
Winter and spring were devoted in Osaka to a complete overhaul of the boat and obtaining Russian passage permits.

Acquarone, Giovanni (2026). Siberian Arctic, The Best Explorer's journey from the Equator to Norway. Milan: Ugo Mursia. ISBN 9788842569756.

The departure from Osaka took place on June 1, 2019, exactly seven years after the departure from Tromsø. After a few stops in Japan (Hiroshima, Ine, Kushiro), the boat headed for Petropavlovsk (Kamchatka) passing along the Kuril Islands to the west in the Ochotsk Sea.

.In Petropavlovsk with the substantial help of Alexei the director of the Mooring Tin (the local Nautical Club) additional permits were obtained with some difficulty to travel the route along Siberia, defined in detail in advance

The route was divided into four legs: Providenija, Pevek, Tiksi and Murmansk. The departure took place on August 3, 2019, with the subsequent passage of the Bering Strait between the Diomedes Islands, crossing the route exactly with the one of 2012. The crew members were Nanni Acquarone (Skipper), Salvatore Magri, Romolo Becchetti, Danilo and Gianfranco Riccioni.

The arrival in Tromsø happened on October 3, 2019 after more than 8,000 nautical miles from the departure from Osaka, more than 60,000 miles from the departure from Italy in 2007.

During this trip about four hundred water samples were taken for the detection of the organic substance content on behalf of ENEA (the National Agency for New Technologies, Energy and Sustainable Economic Development).

With this sailing the boat, the Skipper Nanni Acquarone and his crew mate Salvatore Magri became the first Italians to complete the Northeast Passage or Northern Sea Route and the circumnavigation of the Arctic Ocean and the second in the world to have done it clockwise.

=== 2021 - Svalbard Islands ===
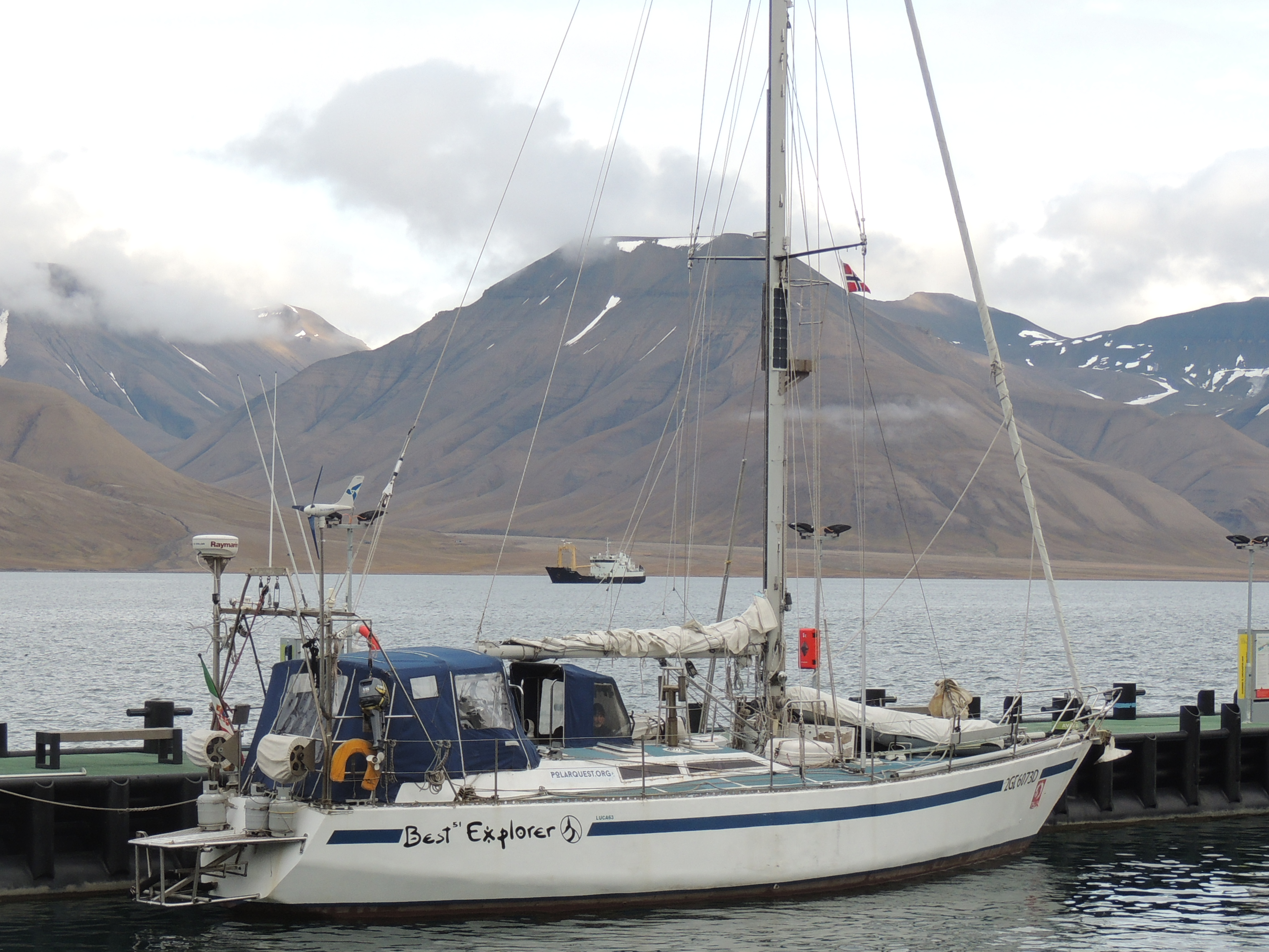
Port of Longyearbyen, Svalbard, 24 August 2021

After an extended pause due to the COVID-19 pandemic, the boat resumed sailing in 2021.

The Polarquest Association with President Paola Catapano used Best Explorer, with Nanni Acquarone as Skipper and Expedition Leader, to carry out four different scientific research programs in the Arctic north of the Svalbard Islands.

The same was later done by the French CNRS for the completion of a research in an area east of Spitzbergen, in Storfjord.

=== 2022 - Along the Norwegian coast and Sweden to Denmark ===
As the skipper aged, there was increased pressure to find a buyer for the Best Explorer. 2022 was dedicated to visiting the coasts of Norway, which had been neglected until now, with a navigation in stages that touched the main ports and fjords of this land. Sometimes with a very small crew, sometimes with mostly completely novice guests, the navigation went smoothly, ending up in the familiar waters of the Kattegat and finding rest on land in the port of Skodshoved, near Copenhagen.

=== 2023 - Baltic Sea: Sweden and Aland Islands ===
The winter stop found assistance of great quality and typically Danish courtesy, which allowed us an easy departure towards this last farewell cruise, much more relaxed and touristy than the previous ones, even if the Baltic Sea shows a peppery character every now and then. At the end of the season the boat was offered for sale.

=== 2024 - Copenhagen ===
During the winter, the boat was left floating to allow an easier way to be surveyed. It was hoped that an Italian Institution would be interested in taking ownership of the boat as a symbol of Italy, but there was no interest expressed. Finally, a new owner was found in Denmark and, in the summer, Best Explorer removed the Italian flag.

== Shore team ==
Long trips to remote locations require a complex support organization. In the case of exploration boats the support group is usually called Ground Team.

Best Explorer was supported by a ground team especially in the 2012, Northwest Passage, and 2019, Northeast Passage. Other navigations also used it in a lesser extent.

One of the main tasks is the collection and transmission of meteorological information in the navigation area. Another is to get any materials not available on site and another is the preparation of the welcome in the places of stage and winter stop.

The ground team is variable according to the commitments of the people, who deal with it free of charge. The names of the members, in alphabetical order, are: Marco Acquarone, Mario Acquarone, Nicoletta Martini, and Filippo Mennuni. In the course of the 2019 support is received, in the within of a plan of alternation School-Job, from the Institute Aeronautical and Nautical De Pinedo-Coluonna with the students of the 3rd and 4th year coordinated by Professor Daniele Nuzzolese who transmitted the weather information customized and specific for the navigation areas. It was also supported by the e-Geos Company, which transmitted specific information on the state of the ice obtained through the Copernicus satellite system, succeeding even on a couple of occasions in identifying the boat in navigation on the photos!

== Bibliography ==
- Giovanni Acquarone, Best Explorer. Dal Mar Ligure al Mare Glaciale Artico, Il Frangente, 2010. ISBN 9788887297591
- Giovanni Acquarone - Salvatore Magri, Senza bussola fra i ghiacci. Avventura nell'Artico, Ugo Mursia Editore, 2017, ISBN 97-88-8425583-9-2
- Giovanni Acquarone, Il Mare è il Tuo Specchio, Ugo Mursia Editore, 2023, ISBN 978-8842565000
- Giovanni Acquarone, In the Arctic and around the Arctic Circle, Generis Publishing, 2024, ISBN 979-8-89248-177-9
- Massimo Maggiari, Passaggio a Nord Ovest. Sulle tracce di Amundsen, Alpine Studio, 2015, ISBN 97-88-8993400-9-4
- Pietro Grossi, Il Passaggio, Feltrinelli, 2016, ISBN 9788807032097.
- Giovanni Acquarone, Siberian ArcticUgo Mursia Editore, 2026, ISBN 9788842569756
