= Skibotn =

Village in Storfjord Municipality, Norway

Skibotn (Norwegian); Ivgobahta (Northern Sami); Yykeänperä (Kven); Markkina (Kven)
- Village
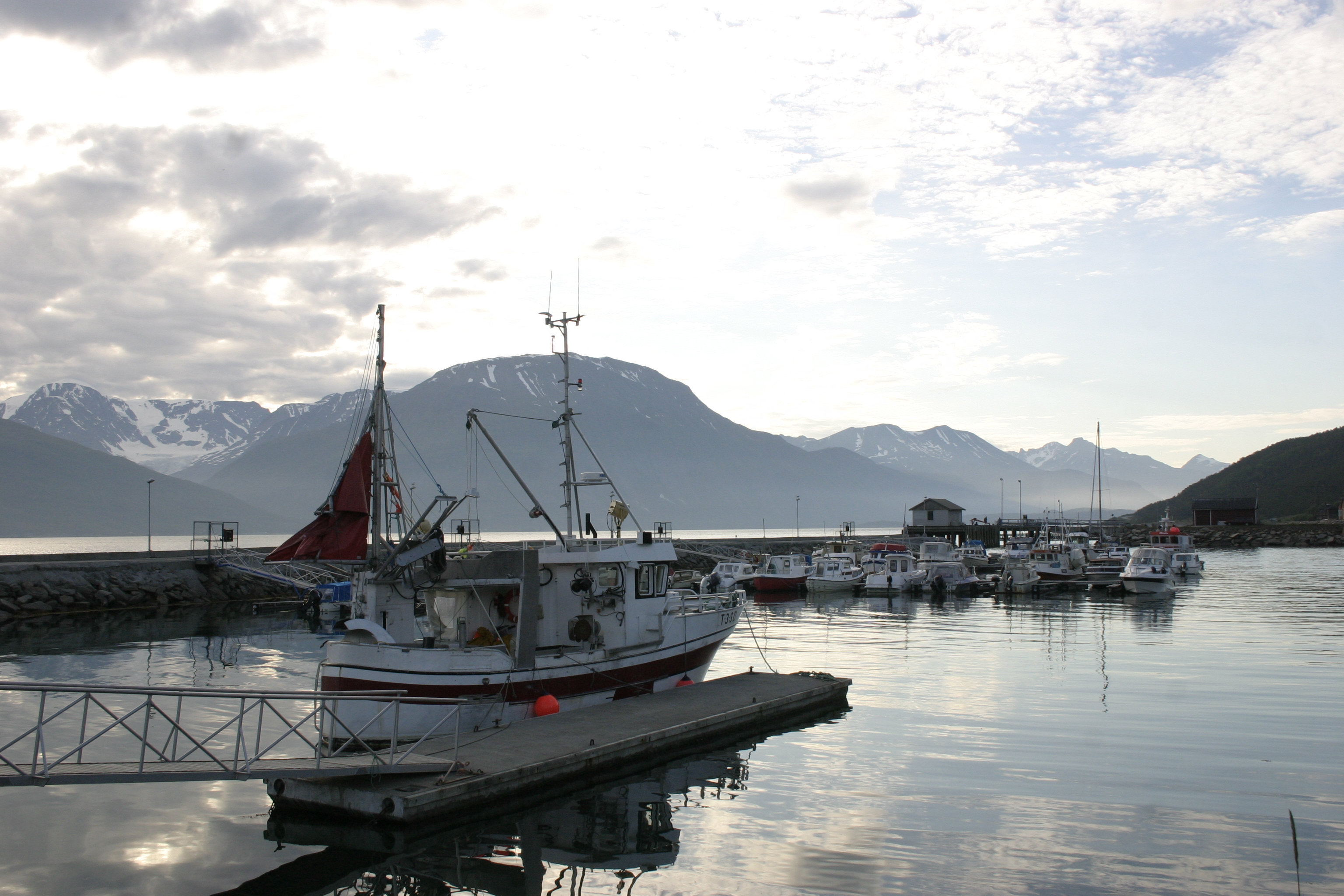
- View of the village harbor
- Interactive map of: Skibotn (Norwegian); Ivgobahta (Northern Sami); Yykeänperä (Kven)
- Location within Troms Location within Norway
- Coordinates: 69°23′27″N 20°16′02″E
- Country: Norway
- Region: Northern Norway
- County: Troms
- District: Nord-Troms
- Municipality: Storfjord Municipality

Area
  - Total: 1.05 km^{2} (0.41 sq mi)
- Elevation: 8 m (26 ft)

Population (2023)
  - Total: 539
  - Density: 513/km^{2} (1,330/sq mi)
- Time zone: UTC+01:00 (CET)
  - Summer (DST): UTC+02:00 (CEST)
- Post Code: 9143 Skibotn

Skibotn (Norwegian), Ivgobahta (Northern Sami), or Yykeänperä (Kven) is a village in Storfjord Municipality in Troms county, Norway. It is located on the southeastern shore of the Lyngen fjord in Northern Norway. The village area is located at the crossroads of the European route E6 and European route E8 highways. The distance by road to Kilpisjärvi, the northernmost community in the western "arm" of Finland, is approximately 50 kilometres (31 mi). Skibotn Chapel is located in the village.

The 1.05-square-kilometre (260-acre) village has a population (2023) of 539 and a population density of 513 inhabitants per square kilometre (1,330/sq mi). The modern day residents of Skibotn are mostly either descendants of the Kven people and Sami people, or immigrants—and their descendants—from Southern and Central Norway.

== Name ==
The village is named after the old Skibotn farm. The first element probably comes from the word skip which means "ship", likely referring to the old harbor in the village. The last element is botn which means "bottom", in the sense of the "bottom" or "innermost" part of the fjord. The other official names Ivgubahta (Northern Sami) and Yykeänperä (Kven) both refer to the bottom of the fjord off of the main Lyngen fjord. An alternate Kven name is Markkina, but that one is not an official name. Markkina refer to the market located at Skibotn.

== Geography ==
Red (630.0 nm) and green (557.7 nm) aurora borealis corona seen through a microclimate cloud clearing along European route E8 in upper Skibotndalen.

Skibotn is located in a valley, surrounded by large mountains including Nallagais, Imagais, Steindalsbreen, Balggesvarr, and Storfjellet. The river Skibotnelva empties into the fjord at Skibotn. Skibotnelva river flows from the lakes Rihpojávri and Gálggojávri. Skibotn is known for its dry climate with frequent clear skies in the Skibotn valley, and the calcareous pine forests, with rare orchids. Due to the climate with few clouds, there is an astrophysical observatory located in Skibotn.

== Climate ==
Climate data for Skibotn II 1991-2020 (20 m, avg high/low 2005-2025)
Month	Jan	Feb	Mar	Apr	May	Jun	Jul	Aug	Sep	Oct	Nov	Dec	Year
Mean daily maximum °C (°F)	−2.2 (28.0)	−1.5 (29.3)	1.6 (34.9)	5.9 (42.6)	11.4 (52.5)	15.3 (59.5)	18.7 (65.7)	17.4 (63.3)	13.1 (55.6)	6.2 (43.2)	1.8 (35.2)	−0.5 (31.1)	7.3 (45.1)
Daily mean °C (°F)	−5.6 (21.9)	−5.6 (21.9)	−2.9 (26.8)	1.5 (34.7)	6.5 (43.7)	10.6 (51.1)	13.6 (56.5)	12.3 (54.1)	8.1 (46.6)	2.4 (36.3)	−1.8 (28.8)	−3.9 (25.0)	2.9 (37.3)
Mean daily minimum °C (°F)	−9.5 (14.9)	−8.7 (16.3)	−6.9 (19.6)	−2.2 (28.0)	2.5 (36.5)	6.7 (44.1)	9.6 (49.3)	8.5 (47.3)	4.8 (40.6)	−0.6 (30.9)	−4.8 (23.4)	−7.5 (18.5)	−0.7 (30.8)
Average precipitation mm (inches)	44 (1.7)	35 (1.4)	40 (1.6)	22 (0.9)	22 (0.9)	32 (1.3)	46 (1.8)	48 (1.9)	43 (1.7)	41 (1.6)	35 (1.4)	40 (1.6)	448 (17.8)
Source 1: yr.no
Source 2: Seklima (avg high/low)

== Notable people ==
- Nils-Aslak Valkeapää, the well known Sami writer lived in Skibotn for a significant part of his life
- Leonhard Seppala, the dog sled racing legend grew up in Skibotn
- Astrid Båhl, the designer of the first official Sámi flag (based on an unofficial flag by Synnøve Persen) lived in Skibotn

== Media gallery ==
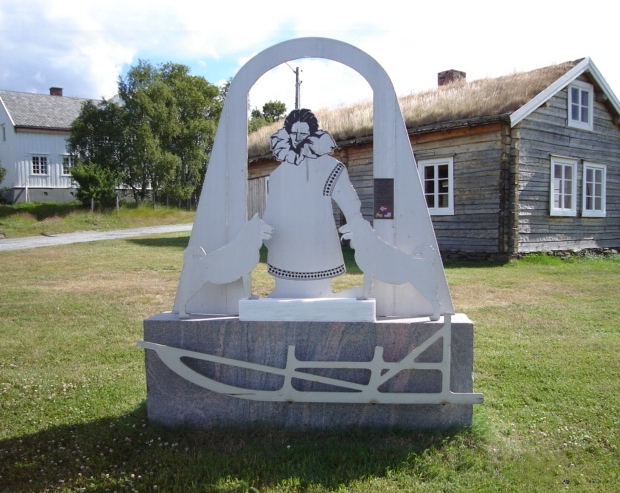
Seppala Monument in Skibotn

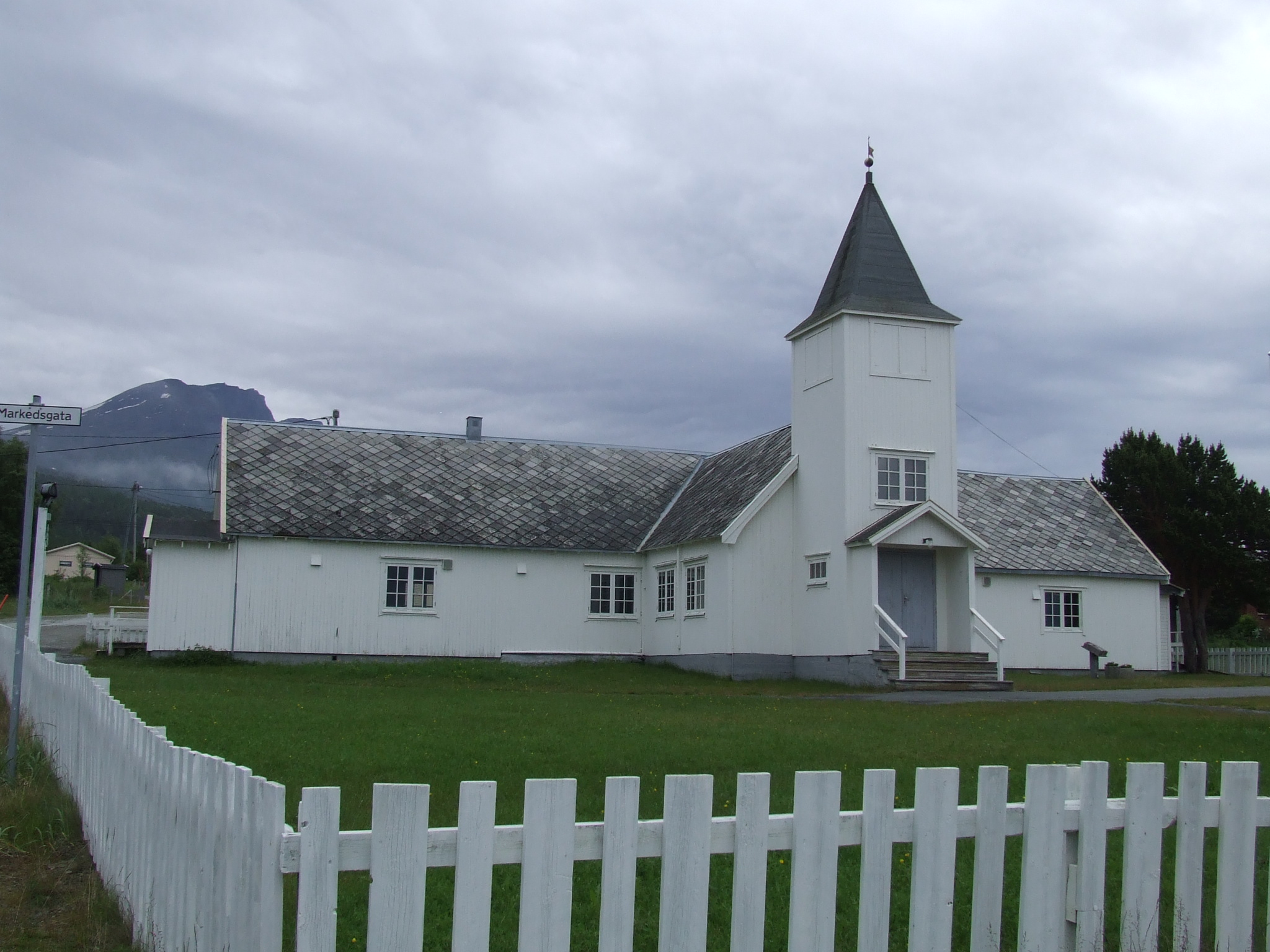
Skibotn Chapel

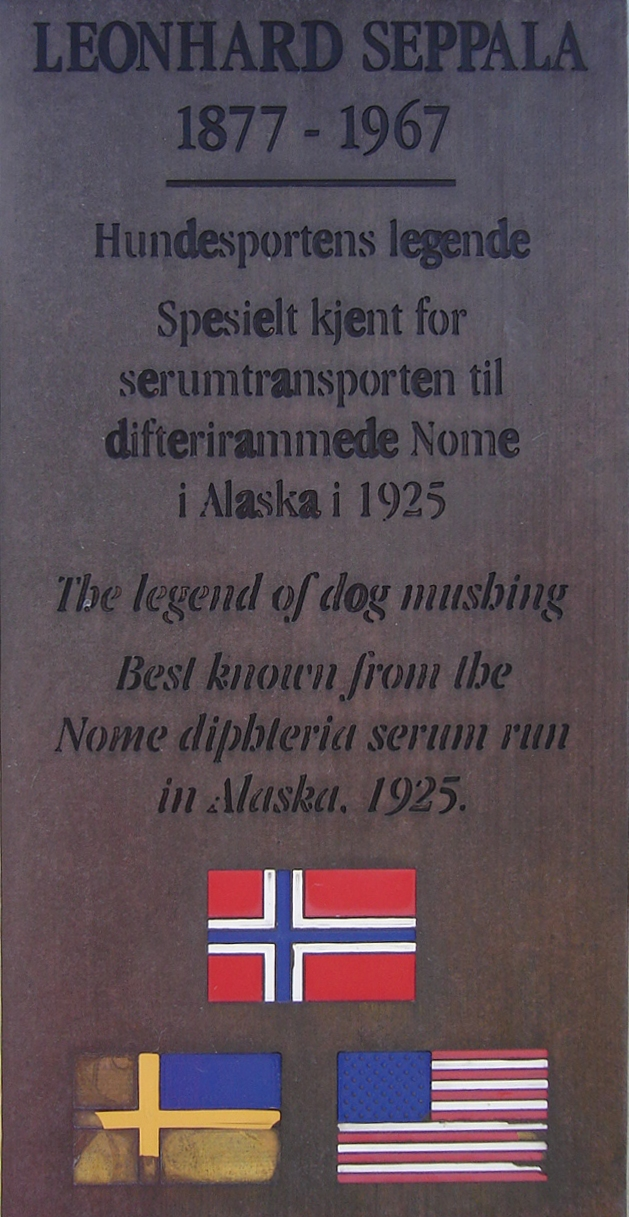
Seppala plaque
