= Sigmund Steinnes =

Norwegian politician (1959–2018)

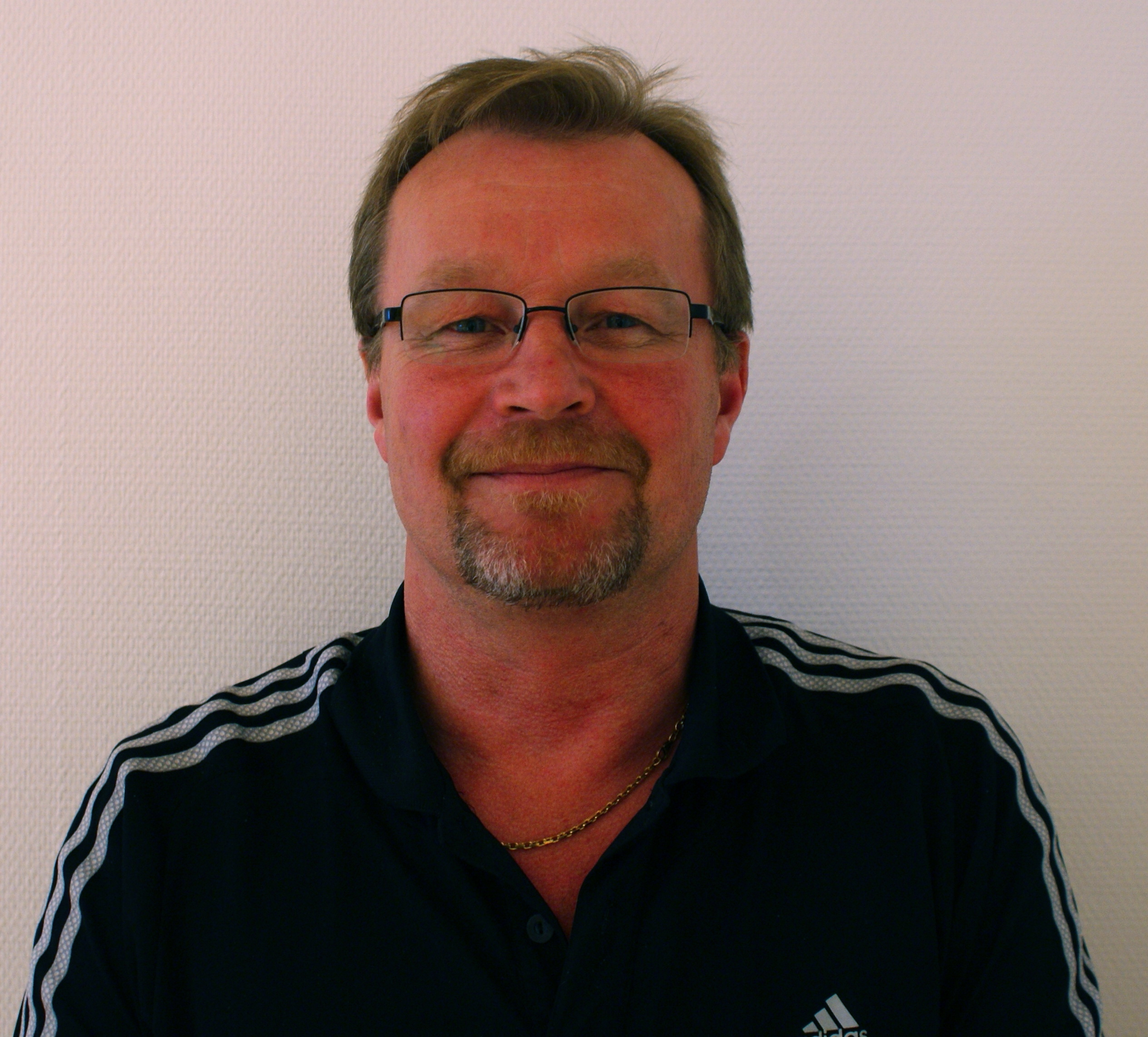
- Steinnes, 2009.
- Born: 19 January 1959; Nordnes
- Died: 15 November 2018 (aged 59)
- Occupation: politician

Sigmund Steinnes (19 January 1959 – 15 November 2018) was a Norwegian politician for the Labour Party.

In the 2013 elections he was elected as a deputy representative to the Parliament of Norway from Troms. He met during 90 days of parliamentary session. In the 2011 elections he was elected as the mayor of Storfjord Municipality. He died of cancer on 15 November 2018, aged 59.
