= Hatteng =

Village in Storfjord Municipality, Norway

Hatteng: Hatteng (Norwegian); Háhtta (Northern Sami); Hattu (Kven)
- Village
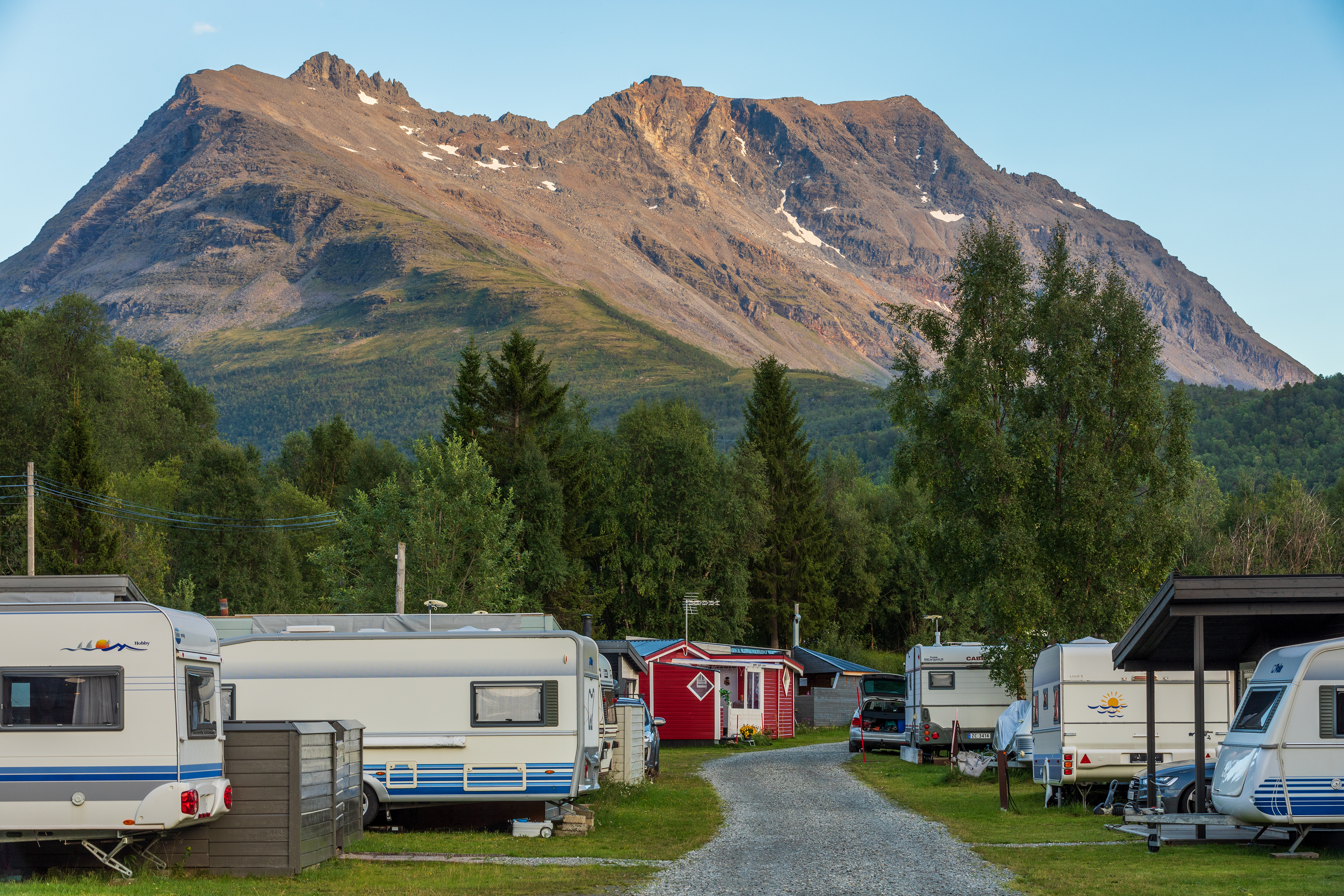
- View of the village
- Interactive map of Hatteng
- Location within Troms Location within Norway
- Coordinates: 69°16′14″N 19°57′34″E
- Country: Norway
- Region: Northern Norway
- County: Troms
- District: Nord-Troms
- Municipality: Storfjord Municipality
- Elevation: 15 m (49 ft)
- Time zone: UTC+01:00 (CET)
  - Summer (DST): UTC+02:00 (CEST)
- Post Code: 9046 Oteren

Hatteng (Norwegian), Háhtta (Northern Sami), or Hattu (Kven) is the administrative centre of Storfjord Municipality in Troms county, Norway. The village is located along the European route E06 highway at the southern end of the Storfjorden, a branch of the large Lyngenfjorden. Storfjord Church is located in Hatteng.

Hatteng sits about 20 kilometres (12 mi) northeast of the village of Nordkjosbotn (in Balsfjord Municipality) and about 33 kilometres (21 mi) northwest of the Treriksröset cairn where the borders of Norway, Sweden, and Finland meet.

Immediately west of Hatteng lies the village of Oteren.
