= Skibotn Chapel =

Church in Troms, Norway

- Skibotn bedehuskapell
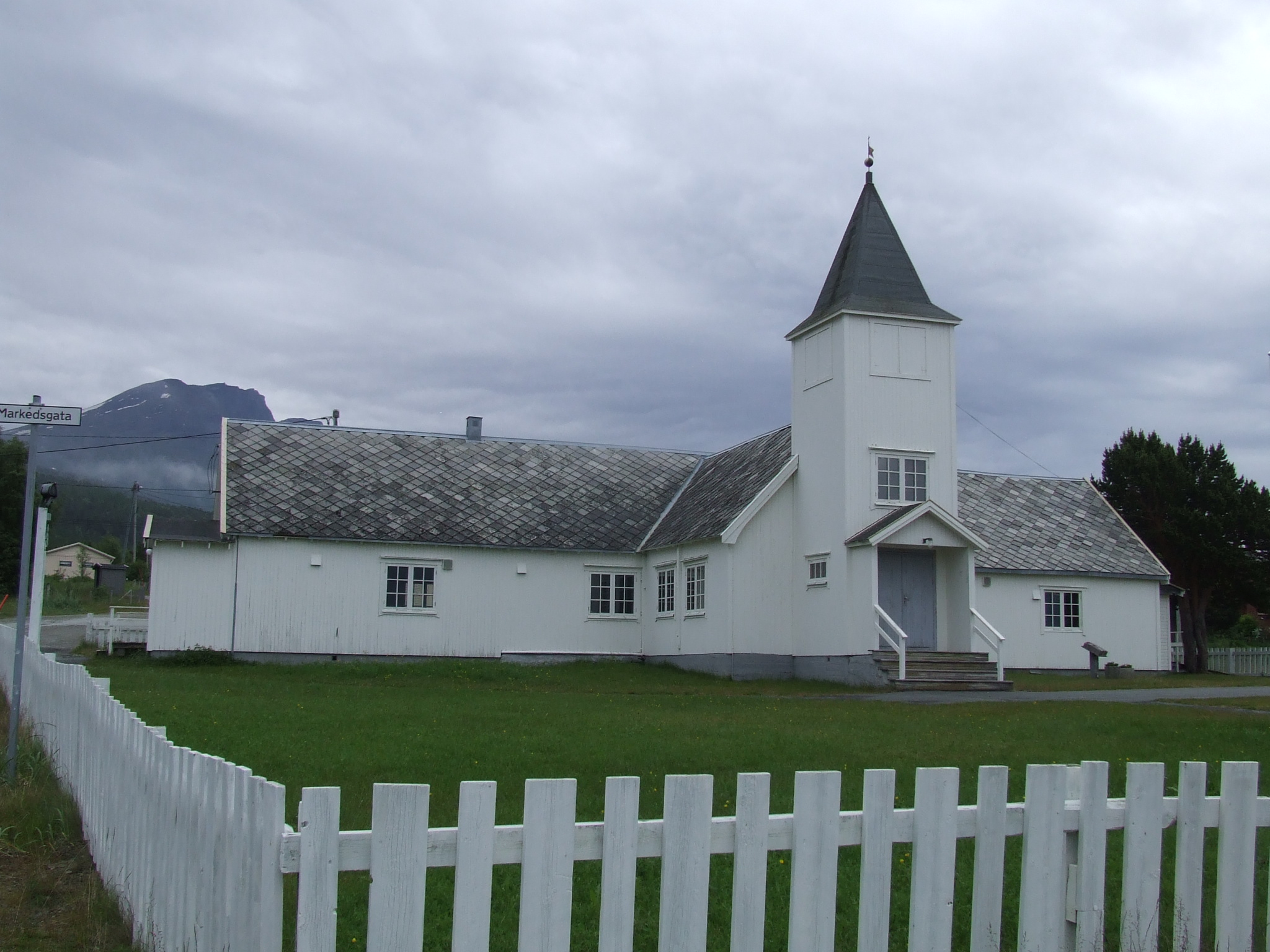
- View of the chapel
- Skibotn Chapel
- 69.3918004°N 20.268337°E
- Location: Storfjord Municipality, Troms
- Country: Norway
- Denomination: Church of Norway
- Churchmanship: Evangelical Lutheran

History
- Status: Chapel
- Founded: 1895
- Consecrated: 22 Jun 1931

Architecture
- Functional status: Active
- Architect: Local builder
- Architectural type: Cruciform
- Completed: 1895 (131 years ago)

Specifications
- Capacity: 710
- Materials: Wood

Administration
- Diocese: Nord-Hålogaland
- Deanery: Nord-Troms prosti
- Parish: Storfjord

Skibotn Chapel (Norwegian: Skibotn bedehuskapell) is a chapel of the Church of Norway in Storfjord Municipality in Troms county, Norway. It is located in the village of Skibotn. It is an annex chapel for the Storfjord parish which is part of the Nord-Troms prosti (deanery) in the Diocese of Nord-Hålogaland. The white, wooden, cruciform chapel was originally built and designed by a local builder in 1895. The building has been remodeled and enlarged several times since. The building was consecrated as a chapel on 22 Jun 1931 by the Bishop Eivind Berggrav. The chapel seats about 710 people (more than the population of the village), and it is used for large Læstadian gatherings for the region.

== See also ==
- List of churches in Nord-Hålogaland
