= Storfjord Church =

Church in Troms, Norway

- Storfjord kirke
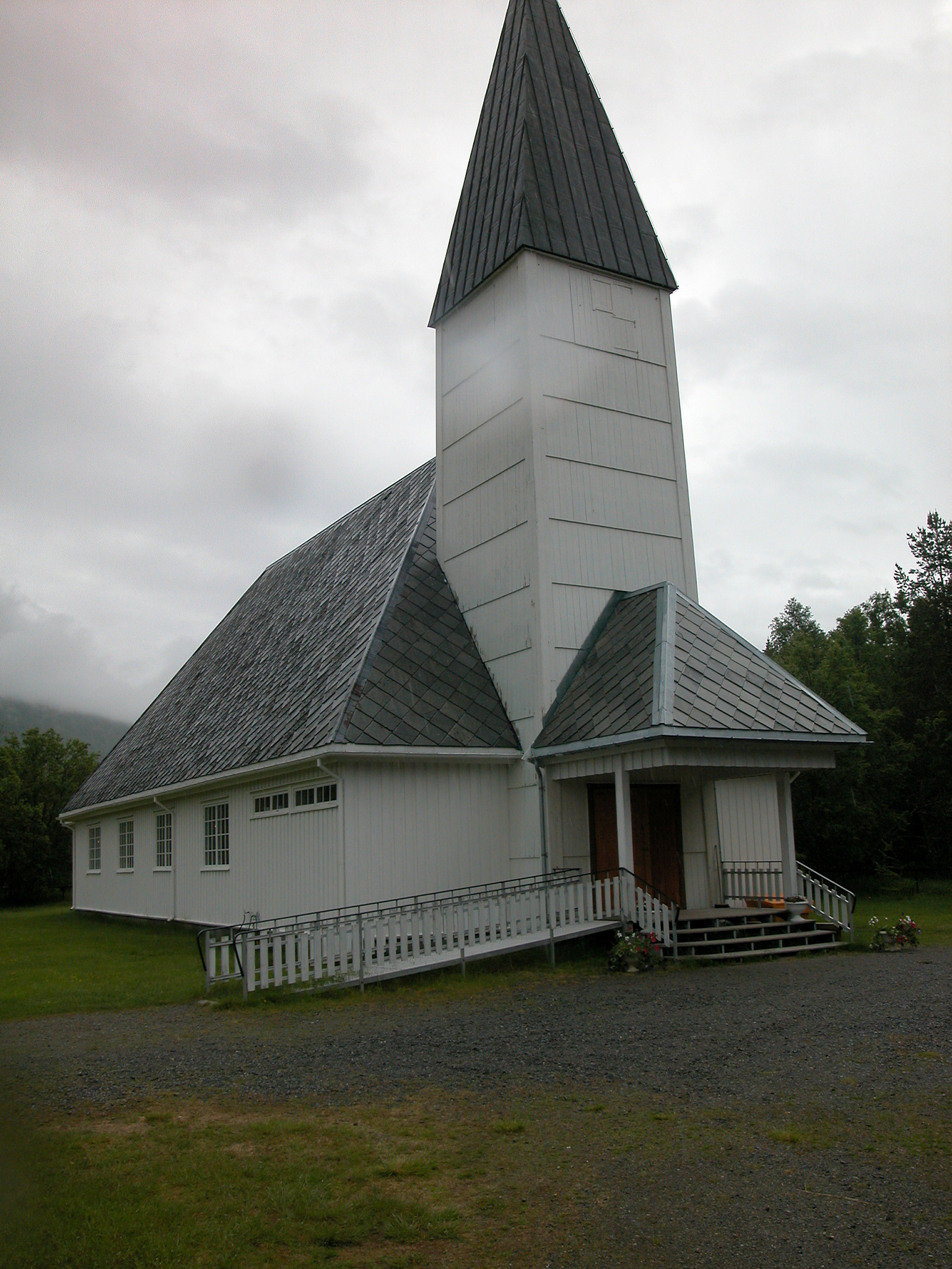
- View of the church
- Storfjord Church
- 69.2721985°N 19.9472987°E
- Location: Storfjord Municipality, Troms
- Country: Norway
- Denomination: Church of Norway
- Churchmanship: Evangelical Lutheran

History
- Status: Parish church
- Founded: 1917
- Consecrated: 1952

Architecture
- Functional status: Active
- Architect: Bjarne Bystad Ellefsen
- Architectural type: Long church
- Style: Empire style
- Completed: 1952 (74 years ago)

Specifications
- Capacity: 320
- Materials: Wood

Administration
- Diocese: Nord-Hålogaland
- Deanery: Nord-Troms prosti
- Parish: Storfjord
- Norwegian Cultural Heritage Site
- Type: Church
- Status: Not protected
- ID: 85583

Storfjord Church (Norwegian: Storfjord kirke) is a parish church of the Church of Norway in Storfjord Municipality in Troms county, Norway. It is located in the village of Hatteng. It is the main church for the Storfjord parish which is part of the Nord-Troms prosti (deanery) in the Diocese of Nord-Hålogaland. The white, wooden church was built in an empire style in a long church design in 1952 using plans drawn up by the architect Bjarne Bystad Ellefsen. The church seats about 320 people.

== History ==
The first church in Storfjord was built in 1917. It was a schoolhouse from 1911 that was renovated and expanded in 1917 to make it into a church. That building was located about 100 metres (330 ft) northwest of the present church site. That building was jointly used as a school and a church for many years. After World War II in 1952, the parish built a new, larger church, just to the southwest of the old church. The new church was consecrated in 1952. Afterwards, the old building was solely used as a school.

== See also ==
- List of churches in Nord-Hålogaland
