= Lyngen (fjord) =

Fjord in Troms county, Norway

Lyngen (Norwegian); Ivguvuotna (Northern Sami); Yykeänvuono (Kven)
- Lyngenfjorden
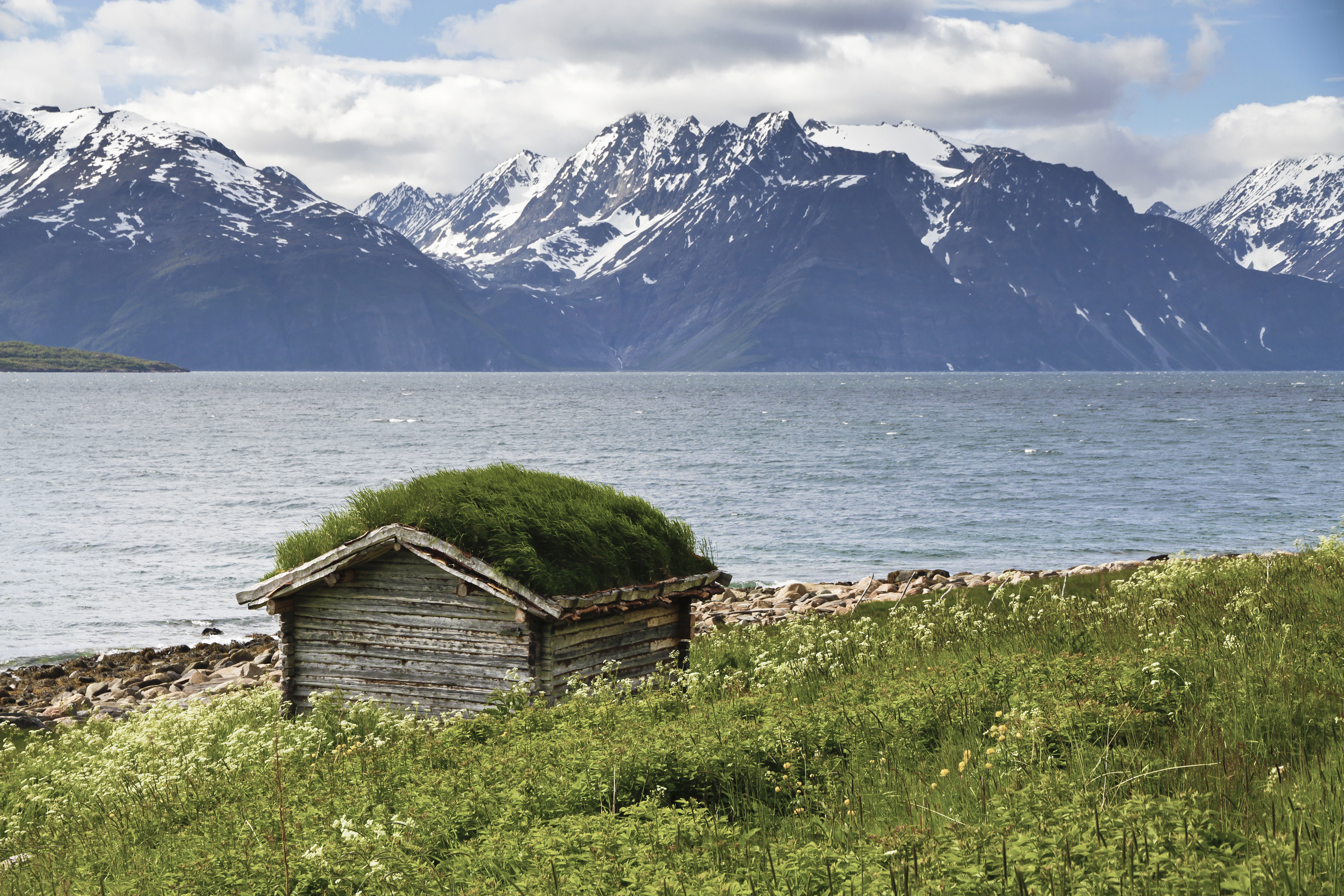
- View of the fjord
- Interactive map of: Lyngen (Norwegian); Ivguvuotna (Northern Sami); Yykeänvuono (Kven)
- Location: Troms county, Norway
- Coordinates: 69.7797°N 20.3827°E
- Type: Fjord
- Basin countries: Norway
- Max. length: 82 kilometres (51 mi)
- Max. width: 10 kilometres (6.2 mi)
- Settlements: Lyngseidet, Olderdalen, Skibotn

Lyngen (Norwegian), Ivguvuotna (Northern Sami), or Yykeänvuono (Kven) is a fjord in Troms county, Norway. The 82-kilometre (51 mi) long fjord is the longest fjord in Troms county and it is often used as the dividing line between "northern Troms" and "southern Troms". The fjord is located within the municipalities of Skjervøy, Nordreisa, Lyngen, Gáivuotna–Kåfjord, and Storfjord. It stretches from the village of Hatteng in Storfjord Municipality in the south all the way north to the islands of Skjervøy Municipality. The Lyngen Alps lie on the Lyngen Peninsula along the western shore of the fjord. The European route E06 highway runs along the eastern shore of the fjord. The Kåfjorden branches off of the main fjord on the east side, and the southernmost part of the fjord is also known as the Storfjorden.

== Media gallery ==
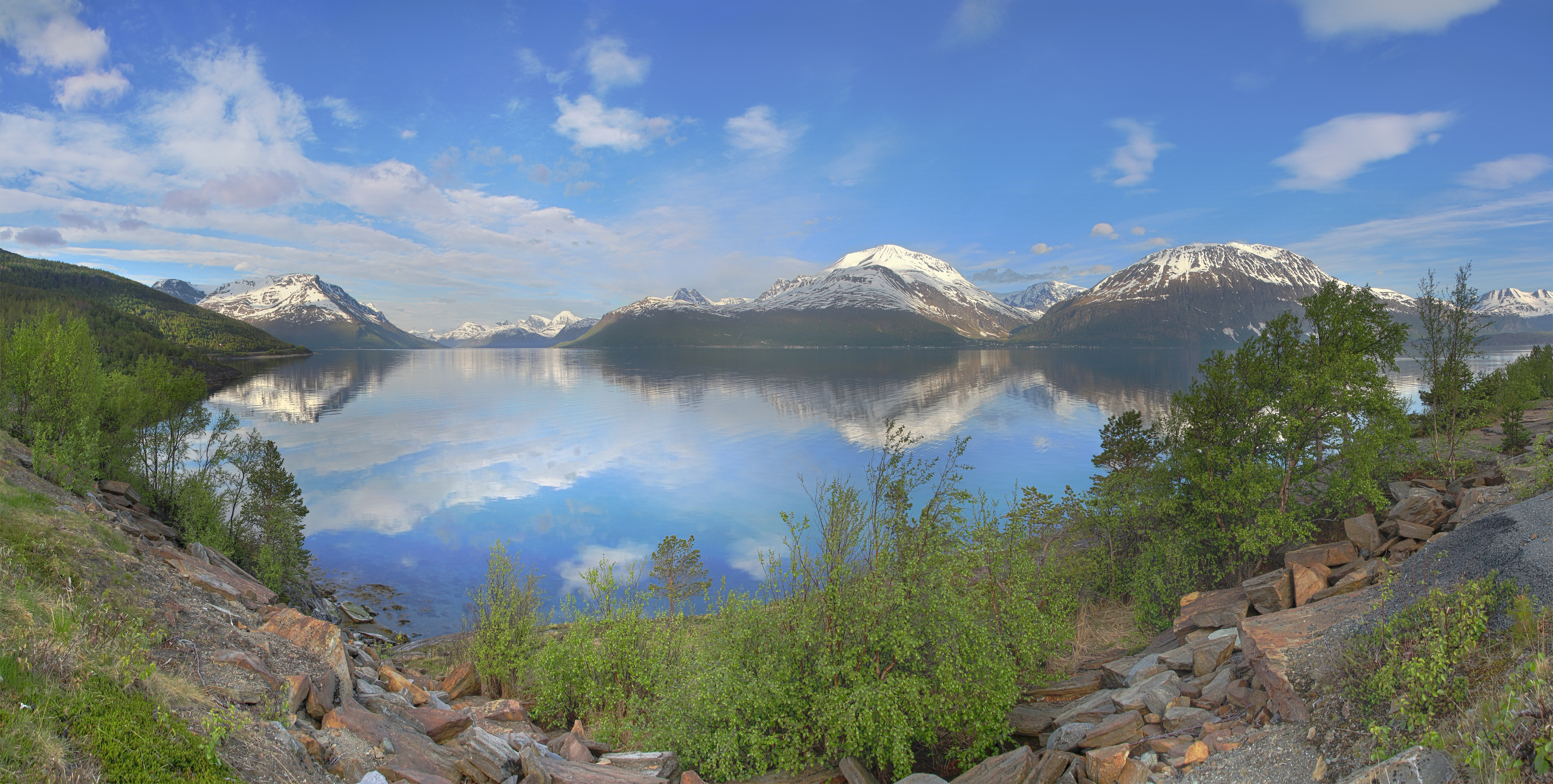
A view of the Lyngenfjord

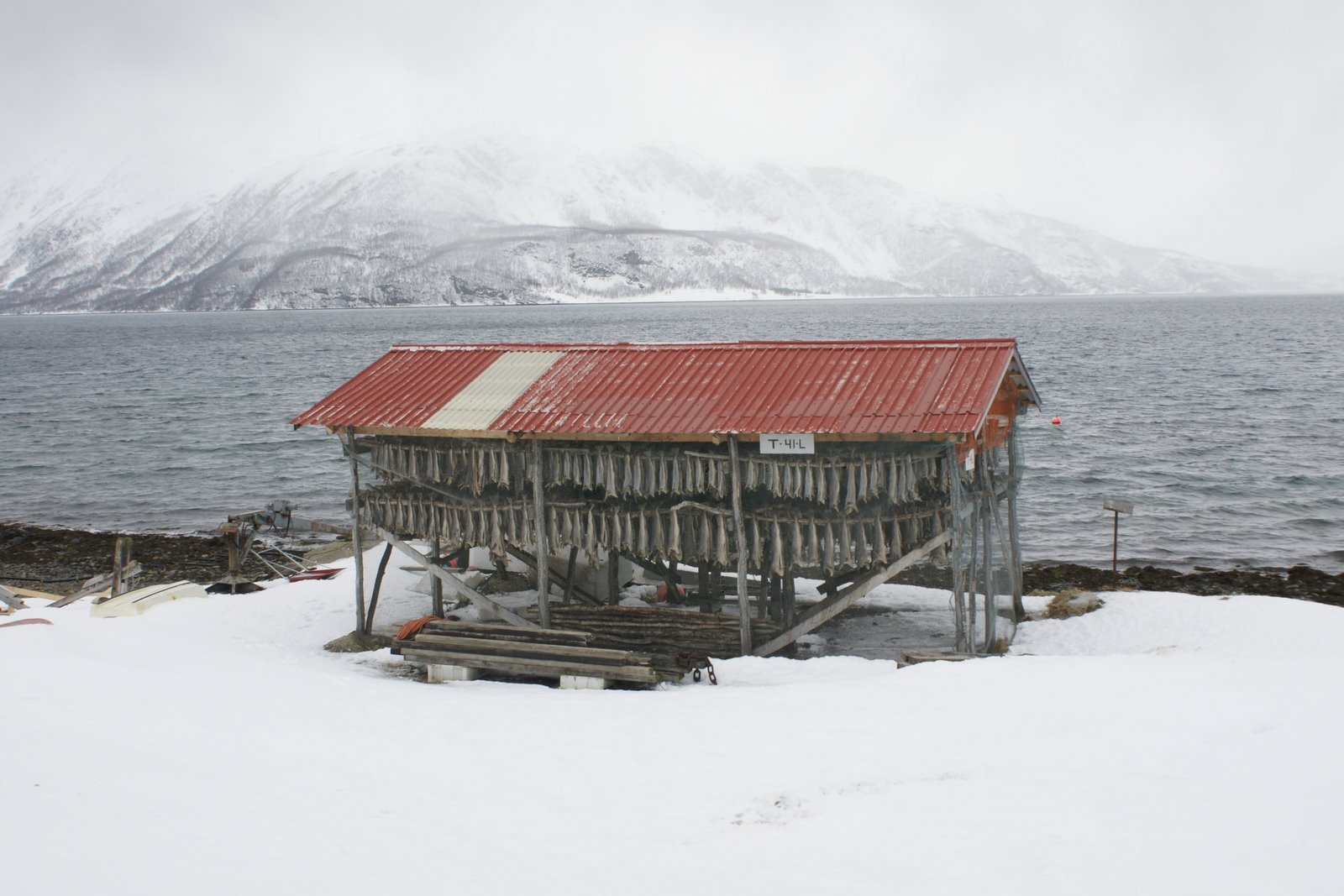
Cod drying along the fjord

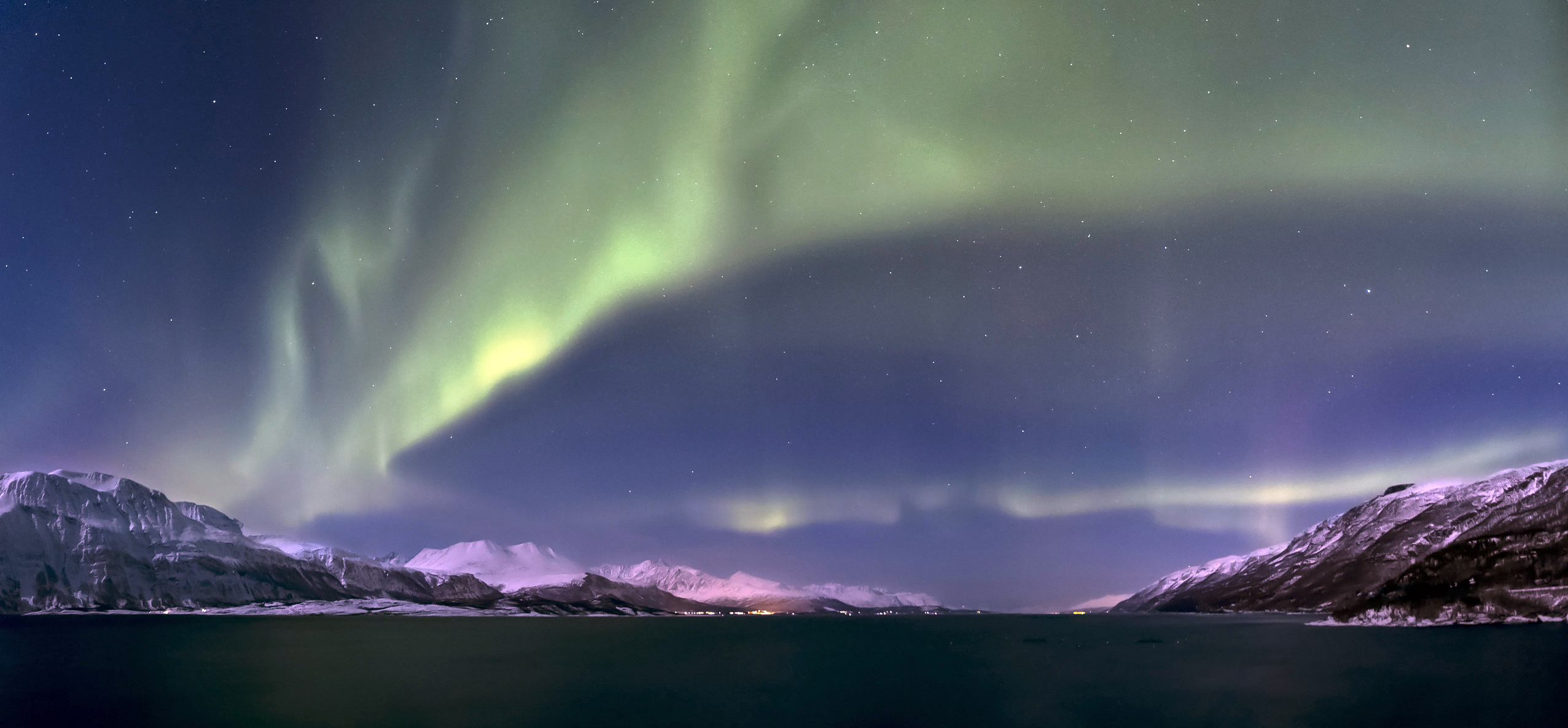
View of the fjord under the northern lights

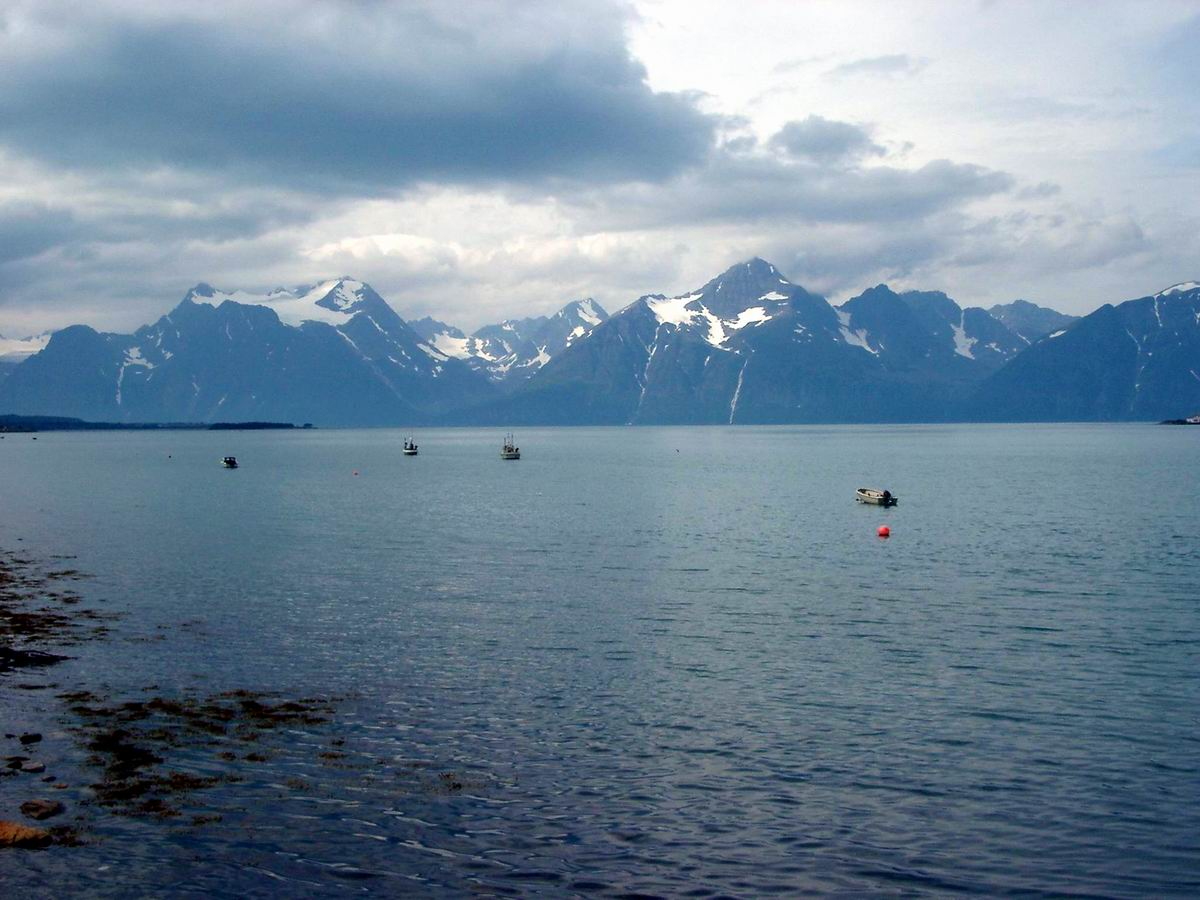
View from Rottsund, Nordreisa
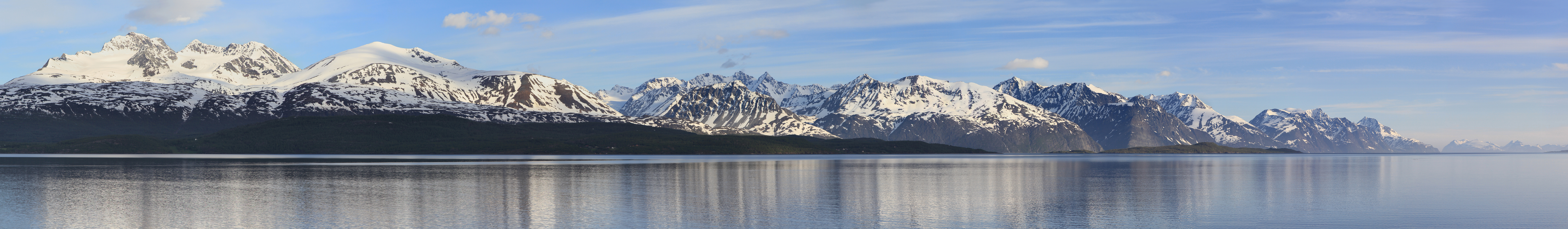
View of the fjord

== See also ==
- List of Norwegian fjords
