= Rihpojávri =

Lake in Storfjord, Norway

Rihpojávri Riehppejávri
- Interactive map of the lake
- Location: Troms
- Coordinates: 69.2099°N 20.6113°E
- Type: Reservoir
- Primary inflows: Roggejohka
- Primary outflows: Rihpojohka
- Basin countries: Norway
- Max. length: 5 kilometres (3.1 mi)
- Max. width: 2 kilometres (1.2 mi)
- Surface area: 5.74 km^{2} (2.22 sq mi)
- Shore length^{1}: 14.77 kilometres (9.18 mi)
- Surface elevation: 486 metres (1,594 ft)
- References: NVE
- ^{1} Shore length is not a well-defined measure.

Rihpojávri or Riehppejávri is a lake which lies in Storfjord Municipality in Troms county, Norway, just to the south of European route E8. The lake is a reservoir that has a dam on the north end. The water leaving the lake flows into the Rihpojohka river which then flows into the Skibotnelva.
