= Storfjord Municipality =

Municipality in Troms, Norway

Storfjord Municipality Storfjord kommune Omasvuona suohkan Omasvuonon kunta
- Municipality
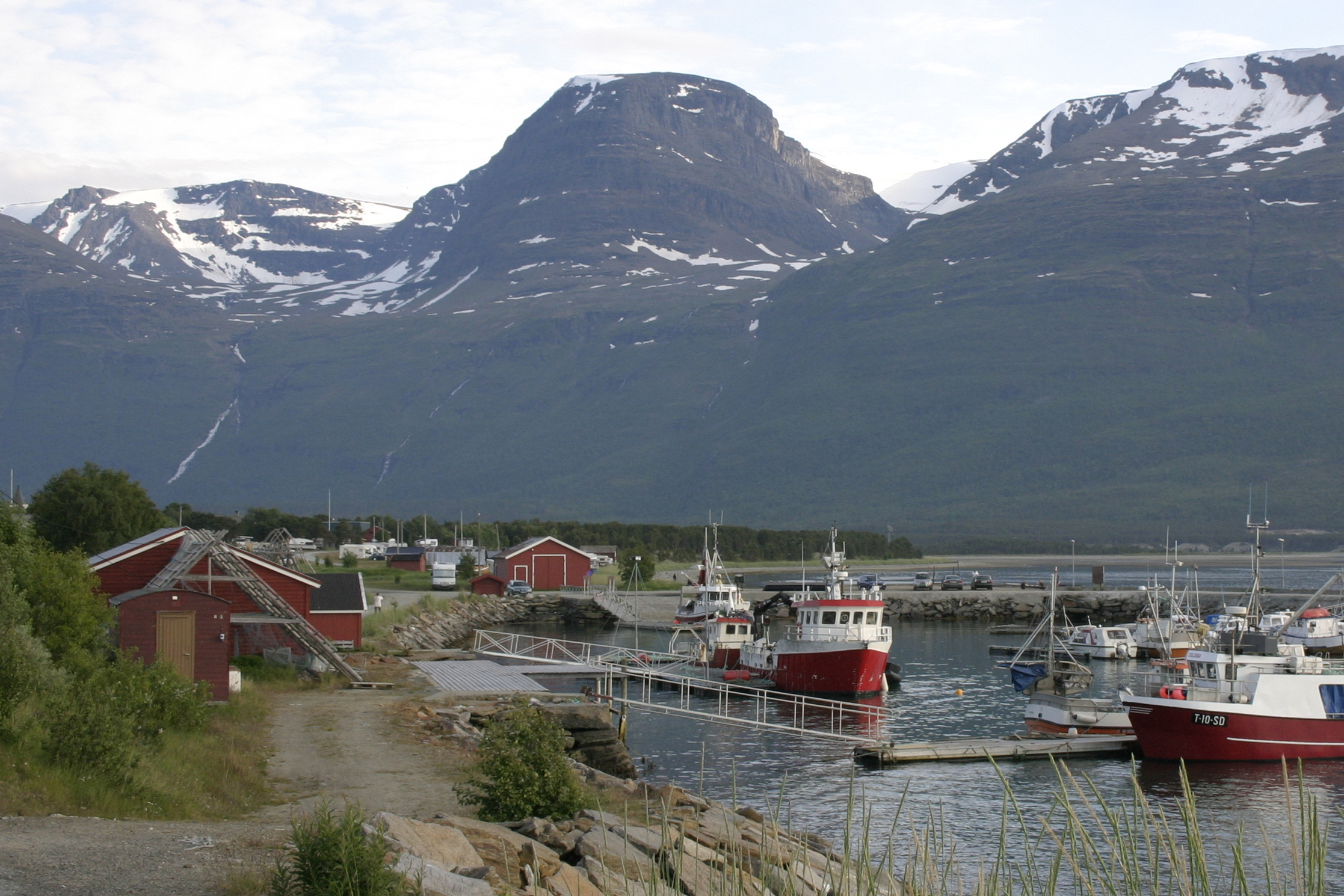
- View of the Skibotn harbor and camping area

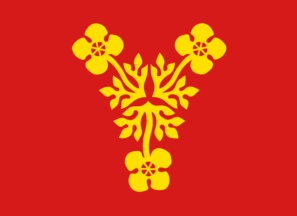
- Flag Coat of arms

- Troms within Norway

- Storfjord within Troms
- Coordinates: 69°16′43″N 20°17′12″E
- Country: Norway
- County: Troms
- District: Nord-Troms
- Established: 21 June 1929
  - Preceded by: Lyngen Municipality
- Administrative centre: Hatteng

Government
  - Mayor (2019): Geir Varvik (H)

Area
  - Total: 1,542.73 km^{2} (595.65 sq mi)
  - Land: 1,476.62 km^{2} (570.13 sq mi)
  - Water: 66.11 km^{2} (25.53 sq mi) 4.3%
  - Rank: #54 in Norway
- Highest elevation: 1,575.64 m (5,169.4 ft)

Population (2024)
  - Total: 1,825
  - Rank: #293 in Norway
  - Density: 1.2/km^{2} (3.1/sq mi)
  - Change (10 years): ▼ −6%
- Demonym: Storfjording

Official language
  - Norwegian form: Neutral
- Time zone: UTC+01:00 (CET)
  - Summer (DST): UTC+02:00 (CEST)
- ISO 3166 code: NO-5538
- Website: Official website

Storfjord (Norwegian), Omasvuotna (Northern Sami; pronounced [ˈomasˌvuo̯tna]), or Omasvuono (Kven) is a municipality in Troms county, Norway. The administrative centre of the municipality is the village of Hatteng. Other villages in Storfjord include Elvevoll, Oteren, and Skibotn.

The 1,543-square-kilometre (596 sq mi) municipality is the 54th largest by area out of the 357 municipalities in Norway. Storfjord is the 293rd most populous municipality in Norway with a population of 1,825. The municipality's population density is 1.2 inhabitants per square kilometre (3.1/sq mi) and its population has decreased by 6% over the previous 10-year period.

== General information ==
The municipality of Storfjord was established by a royal resolution that was approved on 21 June 1929 when the large Lyngen Municipality was divided into three: Lyngen Municipality in the northwest, Kåfjord Municipality in the northeast, and Storfjord Municipality in the south. The initial population of Storfjord was 1,499. On 1 January 1964, the Elvebakken farm of Balsfjord Municipality was transferred to Storfjord. Then on 1 January 1992, one uninhabited farm in the Nordnes area of Lyngen Municipality was transferred to Storfjord.

On 1 January 2020, the municipality became part of the newly formed Troms og Finnmark county. Previously, it had been part of the old Troms county. On 1 January 2024, the Troms og Finnmark county was divided and the municipality once again became part of Troms county.

=== Name ===
The municipality (originally the parish) is named after the Storfjorden. The first element is stor which means "great" or "big". The last element is fjord which means "fjord". Thus the name means "great fjord". After a long debate within the municipality, in 2014 the municipality (and national government) approved co-official names of the municipality so that it can be called Omasvuotna (Northern Sami), Omasvuono (Kven), or Storfjord (Norwegian). These names are parallel, co-equal names that can be used interchangeably to refer to the municipality in the three different languages. The spelling of the Sami and Kven language names change depending on how they are used. In Sami, it is called Omasvuotna when it is spelled alone, but it is Omasvuona suohkan when using the Sami language equivalent to "Storfjord municipality". In Kven, it is called Omasvuono when it is spelled alone, but it is Omasvuonon kunta when using the Kven language equivalent to "Storfjord municipality".

=== Coat of arms ===
The coat of arms was granted on 9 February 1990. The official blazon is "Gules, three poppies Or in pall" (Norwegian: I rødt tre gull valmuer stilt i trepass). This means the arms have a red field (background) and the charge is three poppies of the very rare species Papaver laestadianum (a subspecies of Papaver radicatum). The poppies have a tincture of Or which means they are commonly colored yellow, but if it is made out of metal, then gold is used. The poppies are rotated around a meeting point which represents the meeting point (Treriksrøysa) of the three countries Norway, Sweden, and Finland, that lies on the edge of the municipality. The arms were designed by Arvid Sveen.

=== Churches ===
The Church of Norway has one parish (sokn) within Storfjord Municipality. It is part of the Nord-Troms prosti (deanery) in the Diocese of Nord-Hålogaland.

Churches in Storfjord Municipality
| Parish (sokn) | Church name | Location of the church | Year built |
|---|---|---|---|
| Storfjord | Storfjord Church | Hatteng | 1952 |
| Storfjord | Skibotn Chapel | Skibotn | 1895 |

== History ==
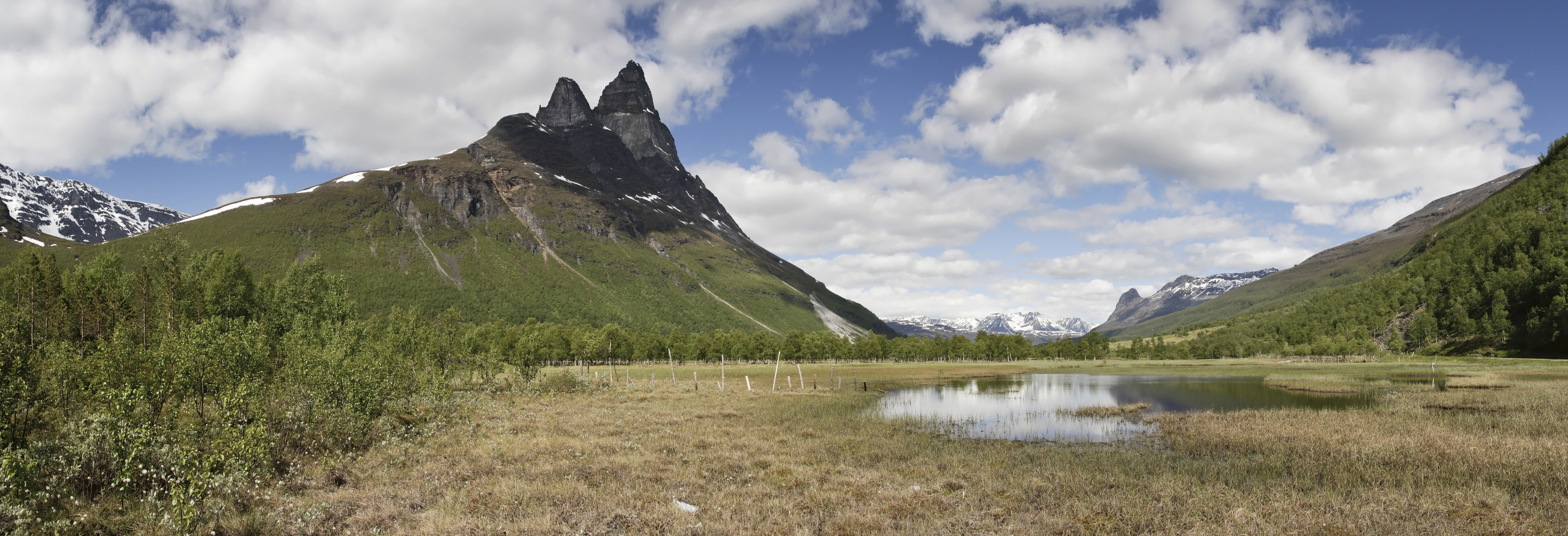
View of the Signaldalen valley

The Sami culture is the original culture; however, in the 19th century, settlers came from Finland and from the valleys of Southern Norway to establish themselves. Sami culture, though, has survived in parts of Storfjord to the present. In the 19th century, Laestadianism, a puritan religious movement, obtained a strong position. Skibotn is even today a stronghold for this movement.

The market of Skibotn was traditionally a meeting point between ethnic groups, where Sami, Finns, and Norwegians met to trade. This market still takes place today. The ethnic mix is interesting, with both Sami and Finnish cultures represented. In the valley of Signaldalen, a Norwegian dialect of southern origin is spoken, a relic of the valley's settlement from the south in the early 19th century.

=== World War Two ===
There were several prison camps there during World War Two. A 2014 NRK article estimated that a total of around 7000 or 8000 Soviet prisoners, were interred in these prison camps. Furthermore, the Mallnitz Camp was the worst.

== Government ==
Storfjord Municipality is responsible for primary education (through 10th grade), outpatient health services, senior citizen services, welfare and other social services, zoning, economic development, and municipal roads and utilities. The municipality is governed by a municipal council of directly elected representatives. The mayor is indirectly elected by a vote of the municipal council. The municipality is under the jurisdiction of the Nord-Troms og Senja District Court and the Hålogaland Court of Appeal.

=== Municipal council ===
The municipal council (Kommunestyre) of Storfjord Municipality is made up of 17 representatives that are elected to four year terms. The tables below show the current and historical composition of the council by political party.

Storfjord kommunestyre 2023–2027
| Party name (in Norwegian) | Number of representatives |
|---|---|
| Labour Party (Arbeiderpartiet) | 2 |
| Green Party (Miljøpartiet De Grønne) | 1 |
| Conservative Party (Høyre) | 7 |
| Centre Party (Senterpartiet) | 2 |
| Cross-Party List (Tverrpolitisk liste) | 5 |
| Total number of members: | 17 |

Storfjord kommunestyre 2019–2023
| Party name (in Norwegian) | Number of representatives |
|---|---|
| Labour Party (Arbeiderpartiet) | 2 |
| Green Party (Miljøpartiet De Grønne) | 1 |
| Conservative Party (Høyre) | 6 |
| Centre Party (Senterpartiet) | 1 |
| Cross-Party List (Tverrpolitisk liste) | 7 |
| Total number of members: | 17 |

Storfjord kommunestyre 2015–2019
| Party name (in Norwegian) | Number of representatives |
|---|---|
| Labour Party (Arbeiderpartiet) | 3 |
| Progress Party (Fremskrittspartiet) | 1 |
| Green Party (Miljøpartiet De Grønne) | 1 |
| Conservative Party (Høyre) | 4 |
| Centre Party (Senterpartiet) | 2 |
| Cross-Party List (Tverrpolitisk liste) | 6 |
| Total number of members: | 17 |

Storfjord kommunestyre 2011–2015
| Party name (in Norwegian) | Number of representatives |
|---|---|
| Labour Party (Arbeiderpartiet) | 7 |
| Progress Party (Fremskrittspartiet) | 2 |
| Conservative Party (Høyre) | 3 |
| Centre Party (Senterpartiet) | 3 |
| People of the Fjord (Fjordfolket) | 2 |
| Total number of members: | 17 |

Storfjord kommunestyre 2007–2011
| Party name (in Norwegian) | Number of representatives |
|---|---|
| Labour Party (Arbeiderpartiet) | 5 |
| Progress Party (Fremskrittspartiet) | 2 |
| Centre Party (Senterpartiet) | 6 |
| Joint list of the Conservative Party (Høyre) and Christian Democratic Party (Kristelig Folkeparti) | 1 |
| Common List (Felleslista) | 1 |
| Skibotn People's List (Skibotn folkeliste) | 2 |
| Total number of members: | 17 |

Storfjord kommunestyre 2003–2007
| Party name (in Norwegian) | Number of representatives |
|---|---|
| Labour Party (Arbeiderpartiet) | 4 |
| Progress Party (Fremskrittspartiet) | 1 |
| Christian Democratic Party (Kristelig Folkeparti) | 1 |
| Centre Party (Senterpartiet) | 4 |
| Socialist Left Party (Sosialistisk Venstreparti) | 3 |
| Common List (Felleslista) | 1 |
| Skibotn People's List (Skibotn folkeliste) | 3 |
| Total number of members: | 17 |

Storfjord kommunestyre 1999–2003
| Party name (in Norwegian) | Number of representatives |
|---|---|
| Labour Party (Arbeiderpartiet) | 6 |
| Conservative Party (Høyre) | 1 |
| Christian Democratic Party (Kristelig Folkeparti) | 1 |
| Centre Party (Senterpartiet) | 3 |
| Socialist Left Party (Sosialistisk Venstreparti) | 1 |
| Common List (Felleslista) | 2 |
| Skibotn People's List (Skibotn folkeliste) | 3 |
| Total number of members: | 17 |

Storfjord kommunestyre 1995–1999
| Party name (in Norwegian) | Number of representatives |
|---|---|
| Labour Party (Arbeiderpartiet) | 7 |
| Centre Party (Senterpartiet) | 4 |
| Socialist Left Party (Sosialistisk Venstreparti) | 2 |
| Joint list for the Conservative Party and a local list (Høyre og Felleslista) | 2 |
| Skibotn Common List (Skibotn Fellesliste) | 2 |
| Total number of members: | 17 |

Storfjord kommunestyre 1991–1995
| Party name (in Norwegian) | Number of representatives |
|---|---|
| Labour Party (Arbeiderpartiet) | 9 |
| Conservative Party (Høyre) | 2 |
| Centre Party (Senterpartiet) | 1 |
| Socialist Left Party (Sosialistisk Venstreparti) | 3 |
| People's list (Folkelista) | 2 |
| Total number of members: | 17 |

Storfjord kommunestyre 1987–1991
| Party name (in Norwegian) | Number of representatives |
|---|---|
| Labour Party (Arbeiderpartiet) | 10 |
| Conservative Party (Høyre) | 2 |
| Christian Democratic Party (Kristelig Folkeparti) | 1 |
| Centre Party (Senterpartiet) | 1 |
| Socialist Left Party (Sosialistisk Venstreparti) | 3 |
| Total number of members: | 17 |

Storfjord kommunestyre 1983–1987
| Party name (in Norwegian) | Number of representatives |
|---|---|
| Labour Party (Arbeiderpartiet) | 10 |
| Conservative Party (Høyre) | 1 |
| Christian Democratic Party (Kristelig Folkeparti) | 1 |
| Centre Party (Senterpartiet) | 1 |
| Socialist Left Party (Sosialistisk Venstreparti) | 3 |
| Independent common list (Uavhengig felleslista) | 1 |
| Total number of members: | 17 |

Storfjord kommunestyre 1979–1983
| Party name (in Norwegian) | Number of representatives |
|---|---|
| Labour Party (Arbeiderpartiet) | 6 |
| Conservative Party (Høyre) | 2 |
| Christian Democratic Party (Kristelig Folkeparti) | 2 |
| Centre Party (Senterpartiet) | 1 |
| Socialist Left Party (Sosialistisk Venstreparti) | 3 |
| Workers' Common List (Arbeidernes Fellesliste) | 3 |
| Total number of members: | 17 |

Storfjord kommunestyre 1975–1979
| Party name (in Norwegian) | Number of representatives |
|---|---|
| Labour Party (Arbeiderpartiet) | 9 |
| Centre Party (Senterpartiet) | 1 |
| Socialist Left Party (Sosialistisk Venstreparti) | 3 |
| Joint list of the Conservative Party (Høyre), Christian Democratic Party (Kristelig Folkeparti), and New People's Party (Nye Folkepartiet) | 2 |
| Independent common list (Uavhengig Fellesliste) | 2 |
| Total number of members: | 17 |

Storfjord kommunestyre 1971–1975
| Party name (in Norwegian) | Number of representatives |
|---|---|
| Labour Party (Arbeiderpartiet) | 8 |
| Socialist People's Party (Sosialistisk Folkeparti) | 2 |
| Liberal Party (Venstre) | 3 |
| Local List(s) (Lokale lister) | 2 |
| Total number of members: | 15 |

Storfjord kommunestyre 1967–1971
| Party name (in Norwegian) | Number of representatives |
|---|---|
| Labour Party (Arbeiderpartiet) | 9 |
| Conservative Party (Høyre) | 1 |
| Socialist People's Party (Sosialistisk Folkeparti) | 2 |
| Liberal Party (Venstre) | 2 |
| Local List(s) (Lokale lister) | 1 |
| Total number of members: | 15 |

Storfjord kommunestyre 1963–1967
| Party name (in Norwegian) | Number of representatives |
|---|---|
| Labour Party (Arbeiderpartiet) | 9 |
| Conservative Party (Høyre) | 1 |
| Liberal Party (Venstre) | 3 |
| List of workers, fishermen, and small farmholders (Arbeidere, fiskere, småbrukere liste) | 2 |
| Total number of members: | 15 |

Storfjord herredsstyre 1959–1963
| Party name (in Norwegian) | Number of representatives |
|---|---|
| Labour Party (Arbeiderpartiet) | 8 |
| Communist Party (Kommunistiske Parti) | 1 |
| Liberal Party (Venstre) | 3 |
| List of workers, fishermen, and small farmholders (Arbeidere, fiskere, småbrukere liste) | 2 |
| Joint List(s) of Non-Socialist Parties (Borgerlige Felleslister) | 1 |
| Total number of members: | 15 |

Storfjord herredsstyre 1955–1959
| Party name (in Norwegian) | Number of representatives |
|---|---|
| Labour Party (Arbeiderpartiet) | 8 |
| Conservative Party (Høyre) | 1 |
| Communist Party (Kommunistiske Parti) | 1 |
| Liberal Party (Venstre) | 2 |
| List of workers, fishermen, and small farmholders (Arbeidere, fiskere, småbrukere liste) | 3 |
| Total number of members: | 15 |

Storfjord herredsstyre 1951–1955
| Party name (in Norwegian) | Number of representatives |
|---|---|
| Labour Party (Arbeiderpartiet) | 8 |
| Communist Party (Kommunistiske Parti) | 1 |
| Joint List(s) of Non-Socialist Parties (Borgerlige Felleslister) | 3 |
| Total number of members: | 12 |

Storfjord herredsstyre 1947–1951
| Party name (in Norwegian) | Number of representatives |
|---|---|
| Labour Party (Arbeiderpartiet) | 6 |
| Communist Party (Kommunistiske Parti) | 3 |
| Local List(s) (Lokale lister) | 3 |
| Total number of members: | 12 |

Storfjord herredsstyre 1945–1947
| Party name (in Norwegian) | Number of representatives |
|---|---|
| List of workers, fishermen, and small farmholders (Arbeidere, fiskere, småbrukere liste) | 6 |
| Local List(s) (Lokale lister) | 6 |
| Total number of members: | 12 |

Storfjord herredsstyre 1937–1941*
| Party name (in Norwegian) | Number of representatives |
|---|---|
| Labour Party (Arbeiderpartiet) | 6 |
| Joint List(s) of Non-Socialist Parties (Borgerlige Felleslister) | 5 |
| Local List(s) (Lokale lister) | 1 |
| Total number of members: | 12 |
Note: Due to the German occupation of Norway during World War II, no elections were held for new municipal councils until after the war ended in 1945.

=== Mayors ===
The mayor (Norwegian: ordfører) of Storfjord Municipality is the political leader of the municipality and the chairperson of the municipal council. Here is a list of people who have held this position:

- 1929–1934: Amund Flugum (V)
- 1934–1936: Nils Johan Tillnes (Ap)
- 1936–1937: Oskar Heiskel (Ap)
- 1937–1940: Hans Tillnes (Ap)
- 1940–1942: Amund Flugum (NS)
- 1942–1943: Isak Heiskel (NS)
- 1943–1945: Hans Ingebrigt Hansen (NS)
- 1945–1964: Fridtjov Olsborg (Ap)
- 1964–1978: Rasmus Engstad (Ap)
- 1979–1993: Idar Mikkelsen (Ap)
- 1993–2003: Hans Strandvoll (Ap)
- 2003–2011: Hanne Braathen (Sp)
- 2011–2015: Sigmund Steinnes (Ap)
- 2015–2019: Knut Jentoft (LL)
- 2019–present: Geir Varvik (H)

== Geography ==
The municipality is situated around the inner parts of the Lyngen fjord. Storfjord borders both Finland and Sweden, and the borders of the three countries meet at the beacon of Treriksröset, the northernmost point of Sweden. Treriksrøysa is a popular hiking destination; there are no fences, so at this location one step forward is all that is needed to get from one country to another. Pine and birch forests are common in the valleys in Storfjord, and the more rare calcareous pine forests, with several orchids, are also present. The lake Rihpojávri is located near the eastern border of Storfjord. The highest point in the municipality is a 1,576-metre (5,171 ft) tall peak on the mountain Vassfjellet (which is also partially located in neighboring Balsfjord Municipality.

=== Climate ===
The Skibotn valley has a subarctic climate (Köppen: Dfc) with cold, dark winters and cool to mild summers. Skibotn has the highest number of cloud-free days in the country (88 days) and annual precipitation around 400 to 500 millimetres (16 to 20 in), making it one of the drier areas of Troms. The dry climate is caused by high mountains blocking low pressure weather systems coming in from the north and west, placing the valley in a rain shadow. The Norwegian Centre for Space Weather has an observatory in Skibotn. Precipitation is fairly even distributed over the year, although spring and early summer is drier than the rest of the year. The climate is classified as boreal, but with a complete lack of permafrost (except in the mountains).The all-time high temperature is 32.7 °C (90.9 °F) recorded July 2014; while August 2018 recorded 32.4 °C (90.3 °F). The all-time low is −28.6 °C (−19.5 °F) recorded February 2012 (extremes since 2004). Skibotn recorded 16.4 °C (61.5 °F) 8 November 2024.

Climate data for Skibotn II 1991-2020 (20 m, avg high/low 2005-2025)
| Month | Jan | Feb | Mar | Apr | May | Jun | Jul | Aug | Sep | Oct | Nov | Dec | Year |
|---|---|---|---|---|---|---|---|---|---|---|---|---|---|
| Mean daily maximum °C (°F) | −2.2 (28.0) | −1.5 (29.3) | 1.6 (34.9) | 5.9 (42.6) | 11.4 (52.5) | 15.3 (59.5) | 18.7 (65.7) | 17.4 (63.3) | 13.1 (55.6) | 6.2 (43.2) | 1.8 (35.2) | −0.5 (31.1) | 7.3 (45.1) |
| Daily mean °C (°F) | −5.6 (21.9) | −5.6 (21.9) | −2.9 (26.8) | 1.5 (34.7) | 6.5 (43.7) | 10.6 (51.1) | 13.6 (56.5) | 12.3 (54.1) | 8.1 (46.6) | 2.4 (36.3) | −1.8 (28.8) | −3.9 (25.0) | 2.9 (37.3) |
| Mean daily minimum °C (°F) | −9.5 (14.9) | −8.7 (16.3) | −6.9 (19.6) | −2.2 (28.0) | 2.5 (36.5) | 6.7 (44.1) | 9.6 (49.3) | 8.5 (47.3) | 4.8 (40.6) | −0.6 (30.9) | −4.8 (23.4) | −7.5 (18.5) | −0.7 (30.8) |
| Average precipitation mm (inches) | 44 (1.7) | 35 (1.4) | 40 (1.6) | 22 (0.9) | 22 (0.9) | 32 (1.3) | 46 (1.8) | 48 (1.9) | 43 (1.7) | 41 (1.6) | 35 (1.4) | 40 (1.6) | 448 (17.8) |
Source 1: yr.no
Source 2: Seklima (avg high/low)

== Notable people ==
- Nils-Aslak Valkeapää (1943–2001), a Finnish Sami writer, musician, and artist who lived in Skibotn
- Astrid Båhl (born 1959), a Norwegian Sámi artist who lived in Skibotn
- Sigmund Steinnes (1959–2018), a Norwegian politician who was elected Mayor of Storfjord in 2011
- Bente Pedersen (born 1961 in Skibotn), a Norwegian novelist
- Marja Bål Nango (born 1988), a Norwegian Sami filmmaker who was brought by Sami reindeer herders in Skibotn

== Gallery ==
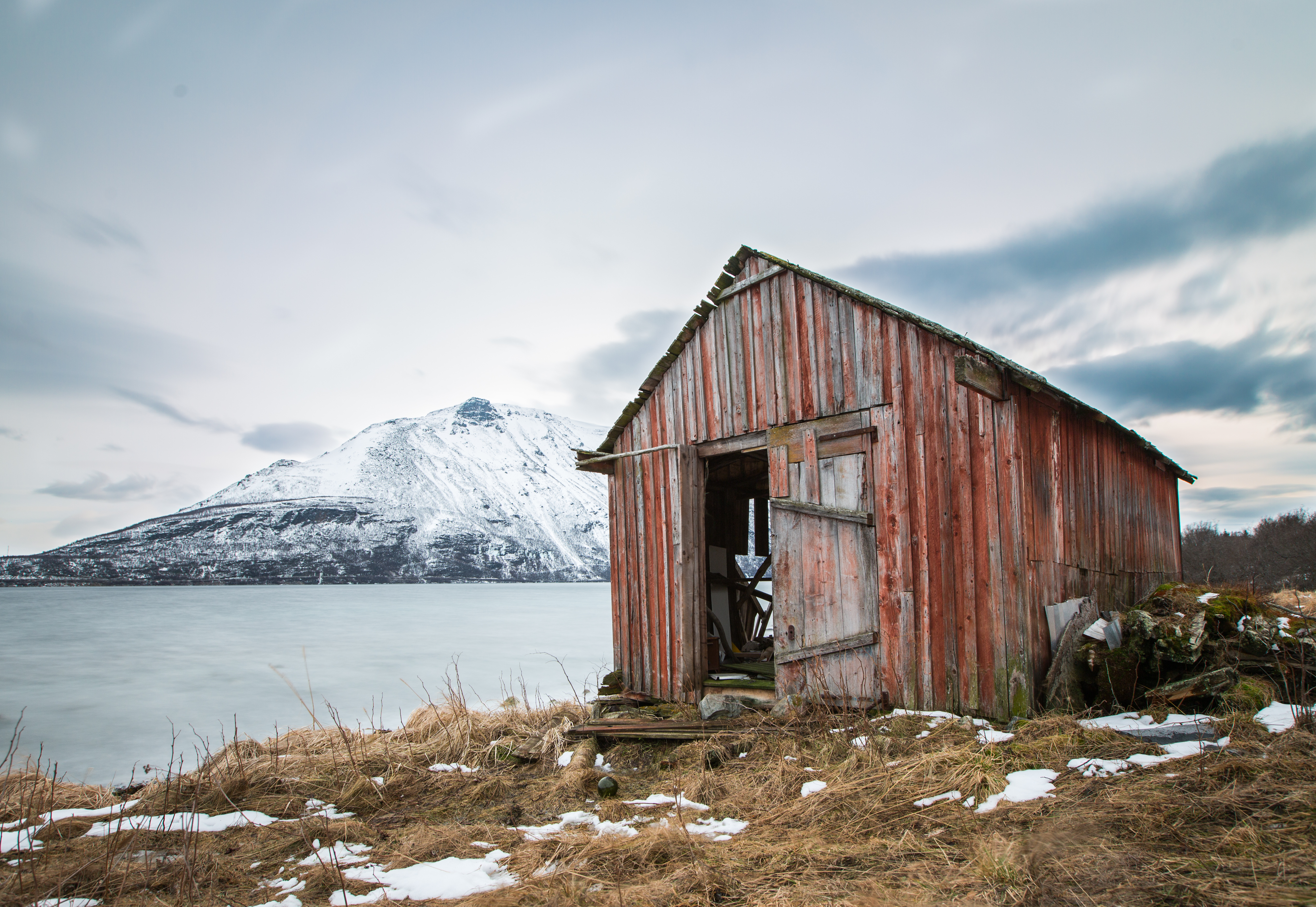
Lyngen Alps

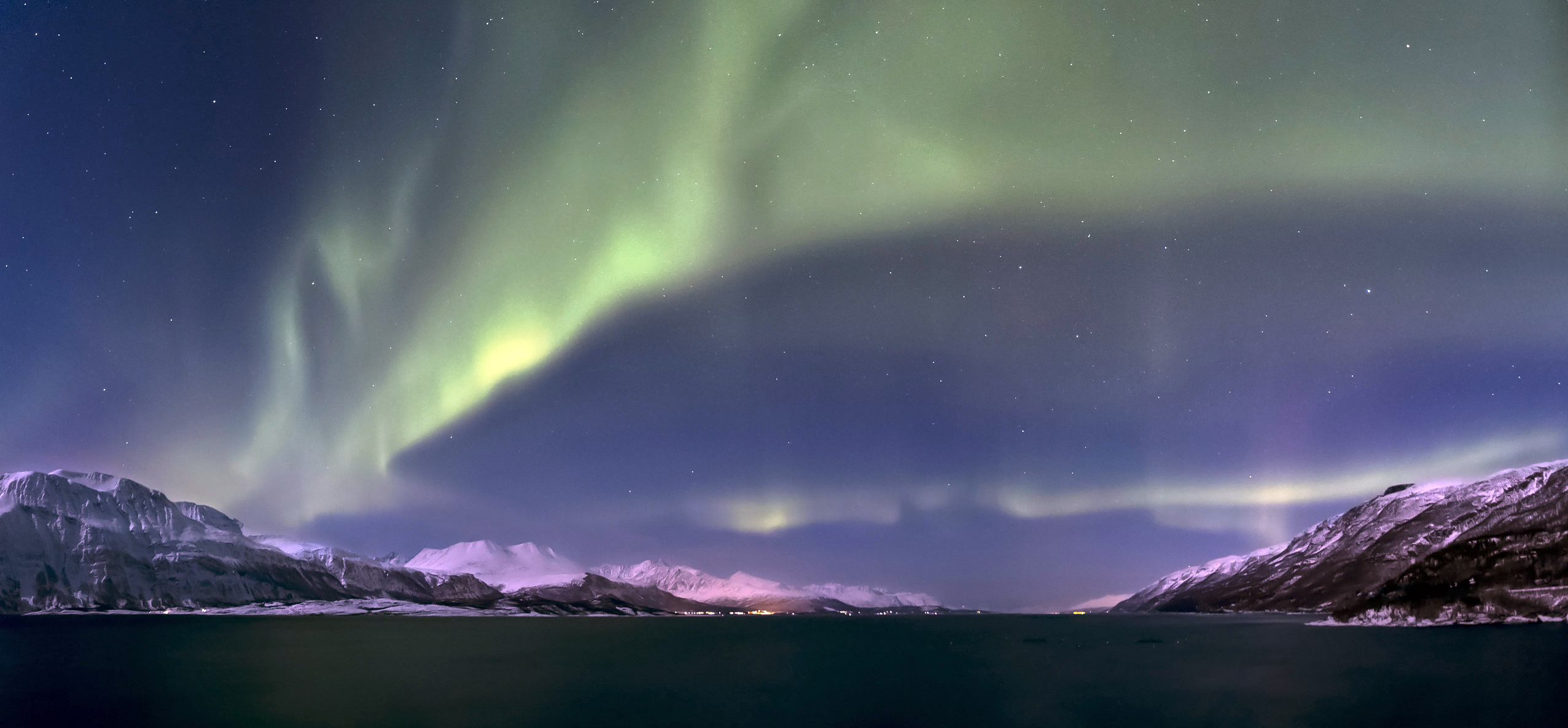
Aurora borealis above Lyngenfjorden, 2012

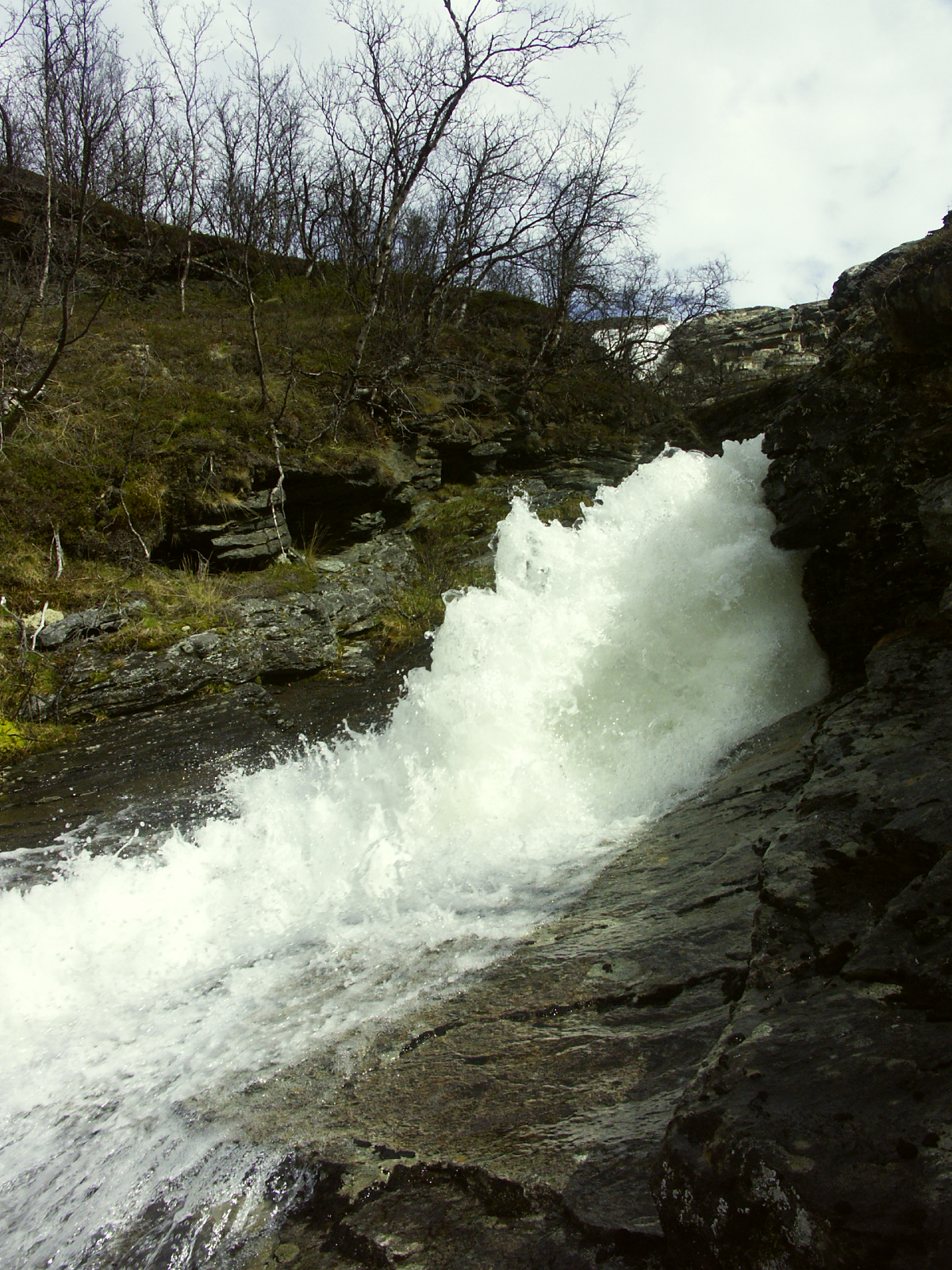
Helligskogen Falls
