= Raija =

Raija is a feminine given name. Notable people with the name include:

- Raija Jokinen, Finnish artist
- Raija Siekkinen, Finnish writer
- Raija Simola (born 1932), Finnish gymnast
- Raija Sollamo, Finnish theologian
