= Torsken Municipality =

Former municipality in Troms, Norway

Torsken Municipality Torsken kommune Doaskku suohkan (Northern Sami)
- Former municipality
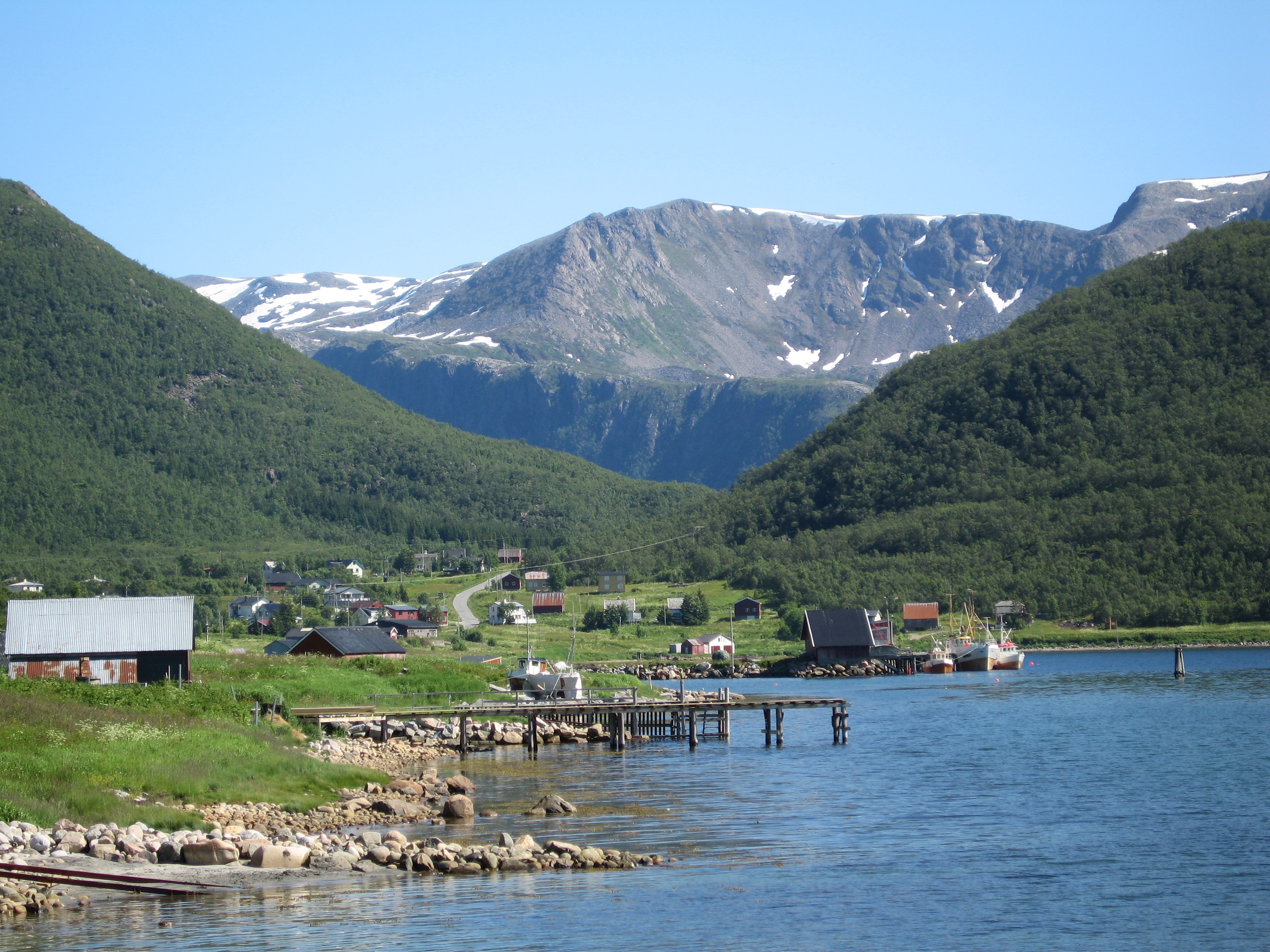
- View of Medby in Torsken

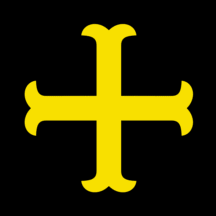
- Flag Coat of arms

- Troms within Norway

- Torsken within Troms
- Coordinates: 69°17′47″N 17°02′11″E
- Country: Norway
- County: Troms
- District: Midt-Troms
- Established: 1 Jan 1902
  - Preceded by: Berg Municipality
- Disestablished: 1 Jan 2020
  - Succeeded by: Senja Municipality
- Administrative centre: Gryllefjord

Government
  - Mayor (2007–2019): Fred Flakstad (Ap)

Area (upon dissolution)
  - Total: 243.42 km^{2} (93.98 sq mi)
  - Land: 235.30 km^{2} (90.85 sq mi)
  - Water: 8.12 km^{2} (3.14 sq mi) 3.3%
  - Rank: #310 in Norway
- Highest elevation: 963.4 m (3,161 ft)

Population (2019)
  - Total: 931
  - Rank: #403 in Norway
  - Density: 3.8/km^{2} (9.8/sq mi)
  - Change (10 years): ▲ +1.6%
- Demonym: Torskeværing

Official language
  - Norwegian form: Bokmål
- Time zone: UTC+01:00 (CET)
  - Summer (DST): UTC+02:00 (CEST)
- ISO 3166 code: NO-1928

Torsken (Northern Sami: Doaskku suohkan) is a former municipality that was located on the western coast of the large island of Senja in Troms county, Norway. The municipality existed from 1902 until its dissolution in 2020 when it was merged into the new Senja Municipality. The administrative centre of the municipality was the village of Gryllefjord. Other larger villages in Torsken Municipality included the villages of Torsken, Medby, and Flakstadvåg.

Prior to its dissolution in 2020, the 243-square-kilometre (94 sq mi) municipality was the 310th largest by area out of the 422 municipalities in Norway. Torsken Municipality was also the 403rd most populous municipality in Norway with a population of 931. The municipality's population density was 3.8 inhabitants per square kilometre (9.8/sq mi) and its population has increased by 1.6% over the previous decade.

The historic Torsken Church in the village of Torsken dates back to the 18th century. Ånderdalen National Park was partially located inside the old borders of both Torsken Municipality and neighboring Tranøy Municipality.

== General information ==
Torsken Municipality was established on 1 January 1902 when it was separated from Berg. The initial population of Torsken was 1,229. During the 1960s, there were many municipal mergers across Norway due to the work of the Schei Committee. On 1 January 1964, the Rødsand area of Torsken (population: 160) was transferred to the neighboring Tranøy Municipality.

In March 2017, the Parliament of Norway voted to merge Berg Municipality, Torsken Municipality, Lenvik Municipality, and Tranøy Municipality. The new municipality would encompass the whole island of Senja plus part of the mainland located between the Gisundet strait and the Malangen fjord. On 1 January 2020, Torsken Municipality ceased to exist when it became part of the new Senja Municipality.

=== Name ===
The municipality (originally the parish) is named after the old Torsken farm (Old Norse: Þoskar) since the first Torsken Church was built there. The farm (and municipal) name were taken from the nearby mountain, Torsken. The name comes from the word þorskr which means "cod". (Several mountains in Norway are named after their likeness with a fish.)

=== Coat of arms ===
The coat of arms was granted on 23 March 1990. The official blazon is "Sable, a cross moline Or" (Norwegian: I svart et gull ankerkors). This means the arms have a black field (background) and the charge is a cross moline (Norwegian: ankerkors; lit. 'anchor cross'). The cross moline has a tincture of Or which means it is commonly colored yellow, but if it is made out of metal, then gold is used. The cross is a symbol for both Christianity and the importance of the local harbor. The economy of Torsken is largely dependent on its harbors and an anchor cross is an appropriate symbol. The arms were designed by Ivar Enoksen.

=== Churches ===
The Church of Norway had one parish (sokn) within Torsken Municipality. It was part of the Senja prosti (deanery) in the Diocese of Nord-Hålogaland.

Churches in Torsken Municipality
Parish (sokn)	Church name	Location of the church	Year built
Torsken	Torsken Church	Torsken	1784
Torsken	Flakkstadvåg Chapel	Flakstadvåg	1925
Torsken	Gryllefjord Chapel	Gryllefjord	1902
Torsken	Medby Chapel	Medby	1890

== Economy ==
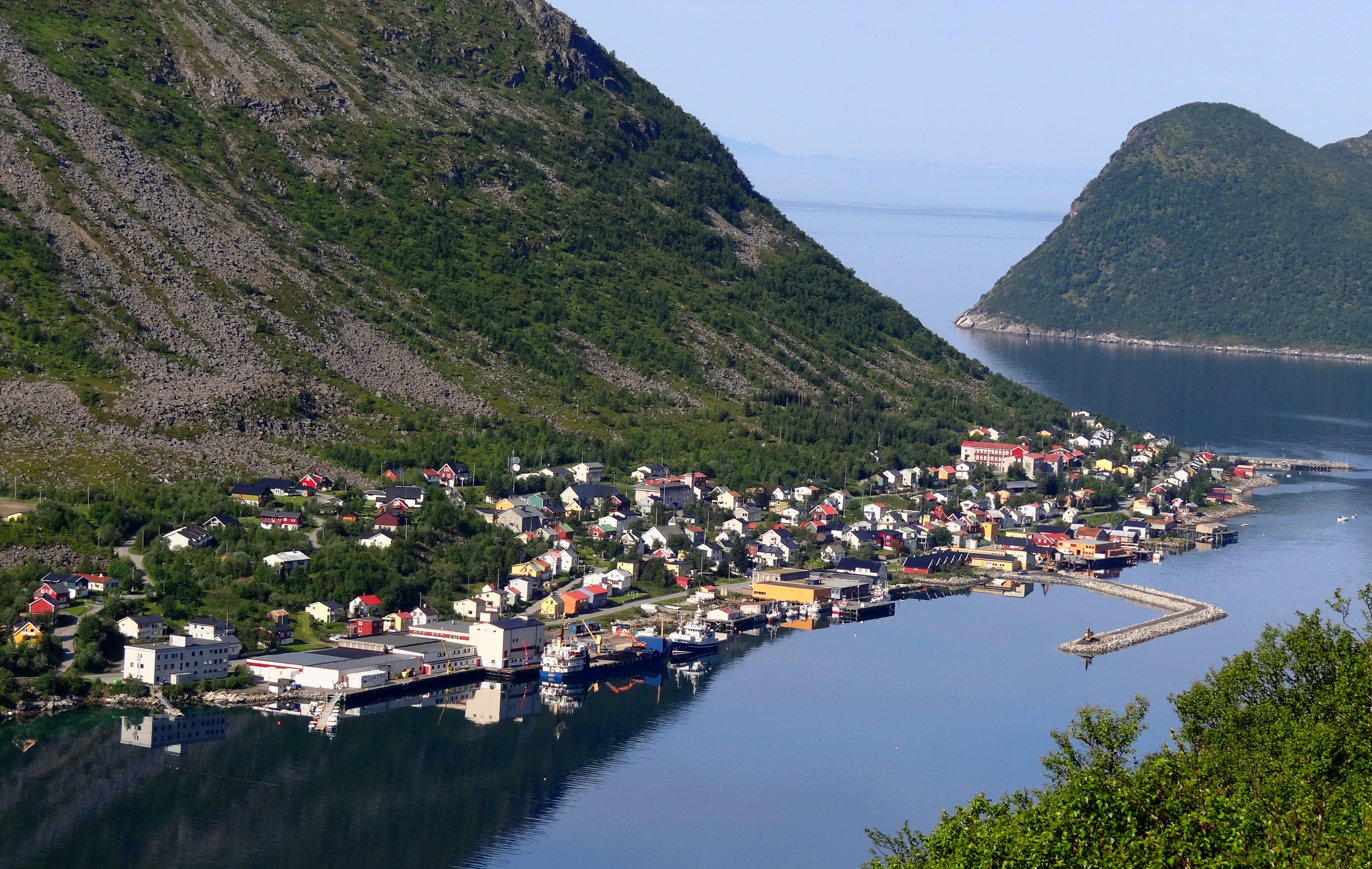
View of Gryllefjord village

Most of the inhabitants of the municipality lived in the fishing village of Gryllefjord in the northern part of the municipality. The second most important village was Torsken, only a few kilometers to the south. Kaldfarnes/Medby, Grunnfarnes, and Flakstadvåg were other fishing villages further south. The municipality was close to the resources of the major fishing grounds off the Vesterålen archipelago, and 2004 landed 9.8 million tons of fish with a value of 76.3 million kr for fish-processing in Torsken, Gryllefjord, Kaldfarnes, and Grunnfarnes. Most people worked in the fishing or fish processing industries.

The municipality had few productive forests, but there were some spruce trees planted in sheltered areas. In the southern parts of Torsken there was some usable farmland. There were five farms with more than 5 decares (0.0050 km^{2}; 0.0019 sq mi) of agricultural land in the entire municipality (as of 1999).

== Transportation ==
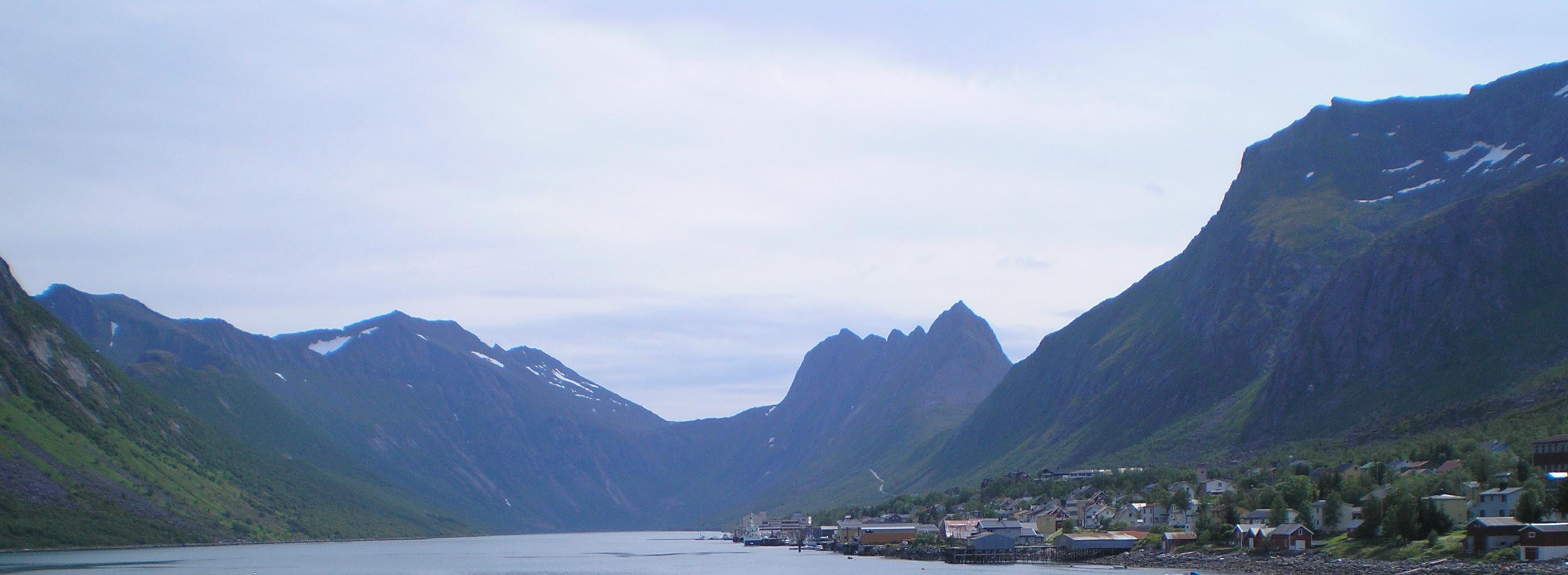
View of the Gryllefjord

The Andenes–Gryllefjord Ferry went across the Andfjorden to the village of Andenes on the island of Andøya. The ferry was operated during about two months each summer. The road from the northern part of the municipality to Kaldfarnes, Grunnfarnes, and Flakstadvåg was far from direct. One had to drive north and then east into the neighboring Berg Municipality and then south into Tranøy Municipality before turning northwest and returning to Torsken Municipality. These were the only road connections from the rest of Norway into Torsken.

== Government ==
While it existed, Torsken Municipality was responsible for primary education (through 10th grade), outpatient health services, senior citizen services, welfare and other social services, zoning, economic development, and municipal roads and utilities. The municipality was governed by a municipal council of directly elected representatives. The mayor was indirectly elected by a vote of the municipal council. The municipality was under the jurisdiction of the Senja District Court and the Hålogaland Court of Appeal.

=== Municipal council ===
The municipal council (Kommunestyre) of Torsken Municipality was made up of 15 representatives that were elected to four year terms. The tables below show the historical composition of the council by political party.

Torsken kommunestyre 2015–2019
Party name (in Norwegian)	Number of representatives
Labour Party (Arbeiderpartiet)	9
Centre Party (Senterpartiet)	6
Total number of members:	15
Note: On 1 January 2020, Torsken Municipality became part of Senja Municipality.

Torsken kommunestyre 2011–2015
Party name (in Norwegian)	Number of representatives
Labour Party (Arbeiderpartiet)	7
Coastal Party (Kystpartiet)	4
Centre Party (Senterpartiet)	4
Total number of members:	15

Torsken kommunestyre 2007–2011
Party name (in Norwegian)	Number of representatives
Labour Party (Arbeiderpartiet)	3
Conservative Party (Høyre)	1
Coastal Party (Kystpartiet)	2
Centre Party (Senterpartiet)	4
Common list in Torsken (Felleslista i Torsken)	1
Gryllefjord local list (Gryllefjord bygdeliste)	4
Total number of members:	15

Torsken kommunestyre 2003–2007
Party name (in Norwegian)	Number of representatives
Labour Party (Arbeiderpartiet)	2
Progress Party (Fremskrittspartiet)	1
Coastal Party (Kystpartiet)	1
Joint list of the Centre Party and free voters (Senterpartiet og frie velgeres liste)	5
Common list in Torsken (Felleslista i Torsken)	2
Gryllefjord local list (Gryllefjord bygdeliste)	4
Total number of members:	15

Torsken kommunestyre 1999–2003
Party name (in Norwegian)	Number of representatives
Labour Party (Arbeiderpartiet)	5
Centre Party (Senterpartiet)	6
Common list (Felleslista)	5
Gryllefjord local list (Gryllefjord bygdeliste)	3
Total number of members:	19

Torsken kommunestyre 1995–1999
Party name (in Norwegian)	Number of representatives
Labour Party (Arbeiderpartiet)	3
Centre Party (Senterpartiet)	7
Common list (Felleslista)	4
Gryllefjord local list (Gryllefjord bygdeliste)	5
Total number of members:	19

Torsken kommunestyre 1991–1995
Party name (in Norwegian)	Number of representatives
Labour Party (Arbeiderpartiet)	5
Socialist Left Party (Sosialistisk Venstreparti)	1
Common list (Felleslista)	13
Total number of members:	19

Torsken kommunestyre 1987–1991
Party name (in Norwegian)	Number of representatives
Labour Party (Arbeiderpartiet)	8
Conservative Party (Høyre)	2
Christian Democratic Party (Kristelig Folkeparti)	1
Centre Party (Senterpartiet)	2
Torsken social democrat common list (Torsken sosialdemokratisk fellesliste)	6
Total number of members:	19

Torsken kommunestyre 1983–1987
Party name (in Norwegian)	Number of representatives
Labour Party (Arbeiderpartiet)	10
Conservative Party (Høyre)	2
Christian Democratic Party (Kristelig Folkeparti)	2
Centre Party (Senterpartiet)	1
Torsken non-party list (Torsken upolitiske liste)	3
Grunnfarnes common list (Grunnfarnes Felleslista)	1
Total number of members:	19

Torsken kommunestyre 1979–1983
Party name (in Norwegian)	Number of representatives
Labour Party (Arbeiderpartiet)	7
Conservative Party (Høyre)	4
Christian Democratic Party (Kristelig Folkeparti)	2
Centre Party (Senterpartiet)	3
Torsken non-party list (Torsken upolitiske liste)	3
Total number of members:	19

Torsken kommunestyre 1975–1979
Party name (in Norwegian)	Number of representatives
Labour Party (Arbeiderpartiet)	7
Christian Democratic Party (Kristelig Folkeparti)	4
Torsken non-party list (Torsken Upolitiske Liste)	3
Midtbygda non-party list (Midtbygda Upolitiske Liste)	5
Total number of members:	19

Torsken kommunestyre 1971–1975
Party name (in Norwegian)	Number of representatives
Labour Party (Arbeiderpartiet)	6
Joint List(s) of Non-Socialist Parties (Borgerlige Felleslister)	2
Local List(s) (Lokale lister)	11
Total number of members:	19

Torsken kommunestyre 1967–1971
Party name (in Norwegian)	Number of representatives
Labour Party (Arbeiderpartiet)	7
Local List(s) (Lokale lister)	12
Total number of members:	19

Torsken kommunestyre 1963–1967
Party name (in Norwegian)	Number of representatives
Labour Party (Arbeiderpartiet)	7
Joint List(s) of Non-Socialist Parties (Borgerlige Felleslister)	4
Local List(s) (Lokale lister)	4
Total number of members:	15

Torsken herredsstyre 1959–1963
Party name (in Norwegian)	Number of representatives
Labour Party (Arbeiderpartiet)	4
Local List(s) (Lokale lister)	11
Total number of members:	15

Torsken herredsstyre 1955–1959
Party name (in Norwegian)	Number of representatives
Labour Party (Arbeiderpartiet)	6
Joint List(s) of Non-Socialist Parties (Borgerlige Felleslister)	2
Local List(s) (Lokale lister)	7
Total number of members:	15

Torsken herredsstyre 1951–1955
Party name (in Norwegian)	Number of representatives
Labour Party (Arbeiderpartiet)	6
Conservative Party (Høyre)	2
Local List(s) (Lokale lister)	4
Total number of members:	12

Torsken herredsstyre 1947–1951
Party name (in Norwegian)	Number of representatives
Labour Party (Arbeiderpartiet)	4
Christian Democratic Party (Kristelig Folkeparti)	1
Joint List(s) of Non-Socialist Parties (Borgerlige Felleslister)	4
Local List(s) (Lokale lister)	3
Total number of members:	12

Torsken herredsstyre 1945–1947
Party name (in Norwegian)	Number of representatives
Labour Party (Arbeiderpartiet)	4
Christian Democratic Party (Kristelig Folkeparti)	2
List of workers, fishermen, and small farmholders (Arbeidere, fiskere, småbrukere liste)	2
Joint List(s) of Non-Socialist Parties (Borgerlige Felleslister)	4
Total number of members:	12

Torsken herredsstyre 1937–1941*
Party name (in Norwegian)	Number of representatives
Labour Party (Arbeiderpartiet)	5
Joint List(s) of Non-Socialist Parties (Borgerlige Felleslister)	5
Local List(s) (Lokale lister)	2
Total number of members:	12
Note: Due to the German occupation of Norway during World War II, no elections were held for new municipal councils until after the war ended in 1945.

=== Mayors ===
The mayor (Norwegian: ordfører) of Torsken Municipality was the political leader of the municipality and the chairperson of the municipal council. Here is a list of people who have held this position:

- 1902–1910: Edvard Pedersen
- 1911–1916: M.F. Carlsen
- 1917–1919: Christian Eilertsen
- 1920–1923: M.F. Carlsen
- 1923–1928: Harry Alvær (V)
- 1928–1932: M.F. Carlsen
- 1932–1934: Harry Alvær (V)
- 1935–1941: Ingvald Johansen (V)
- 1941–1942: Harry Alvær (V)
- 1942–1945: Hjalmar Johansen
- 1945–1945: Ingvald Johansen (V)
- 1946–1951: Arthur Brox (V)
- 1951–1955: Arne Andreassen (Ap)
- 1956–1957: Ingvald Johansen (V)
- 1958–1959: Arne Andreassen (Ap)
- 1960–1963: Ingvald Johansen (V)
- 1964–1967: Konrad Fagerthun (Ap)
- 1968–1975: Ottar Jakobsen (Ap)
- 1975–1979: Ottar Alver (Ap)
- 1979–1983: Oddmund Thobiassen (Ap)
- 1983–1987: Atle Hilmarsen (Ap)
- 1987–1991: Annie Ingvarda Halvorsen (Ap)
- 1991–2007: Hans Peder Pedersen (Sp)
- 2007–2019: Fred Flakstad (Ap)

== Geography ==
Torsken was a rugged area along the west coast of the island of Senja. Many different fjords cut into its mountainous coastline including Sifjorden, Selfjorden, Torskefjorden, Gryllefjorden, and Skipsfjorden. Between mountain peaks that ranged from 600 to 1,000 metres (2,000 to 3,300 ft), there were deep valleys and narrow depressions. The highest point in the municipality was the 963.4-metre (3,161 ft) tall mountain Kvænan. Many of the valleys contained marshes or lakes. The bedrock under Torsken consisted mostly of gneiss and granite.

=== Climate ===
Climate data for Gryllefjord, Torsken
Month	Jan	Feb	Mar	Apr	May	Jun	Jul	Aug	Sep	Oct	Nov	Dec	Year
Daily mean °C (°F)	−2.5 (27.5)	−2.5 (27.5)	−1.4 (29.5)	1.3 (34.3)	5.4 (41.7)	9.0 (48.2)	11.5 (52.7)	11.3 (52.3)	7.8 (46.0)	4.1 (39.4)	0.6 (33.1)	−1.6 (29.1)	3.6 (38.5)
Average precipitation mm (inches)	107 (4.2)	93 (3.7)	87 (3.4)	76 (3.0)	55 (2.2)	67 (2.6)	77 (3.0)	91 (3.6)	114 (4.5)	150 (5.9)	128 (5.0)	130 (5.1)	1,175 (46.3)
Source: Norwegian Meteorological Institute

== See also ==
- List of former municipalities of Norway
