= Torsken =

Torsken is the Norwegian word for "the cod". The word may also refer to:

== Places ==
- Torsken Municipality, a former municipality in Troms county, Norway
- Torsken (village), a village in Senja Municipality in Troms county, Norway
- Torsken Church, a church in Senja Municipality in Troms county, Norway
- Torsken (Agder), a small island in Grimstad Municipality in Agder county, Norway
- Torsken (Asker), a small island in Asker Municipality in Akershus county, Norway
