= Skipsfjorden =

Skipsfjorden may refer to:

== Places ==
- Skipsfjorden, Magerøya, a bay on the eastern side of Magerøya in Nordkapp municipality in Finnmark county, Norway
- Skipsfjorden, Karlsøy, part of the Fugløyfjorden in Karlsøy municipality in Troms county, Norway
- Skipsfjorden, Senja, part of the Torskenfjorden in Senja municipality in Troms county, Norway
- Skipsfjorden, Dønna, part of Stifjorden in Dønna municipality in Nordland county, Norway
