= Gryllefjord Chapel =

- Gryllefjord kapell
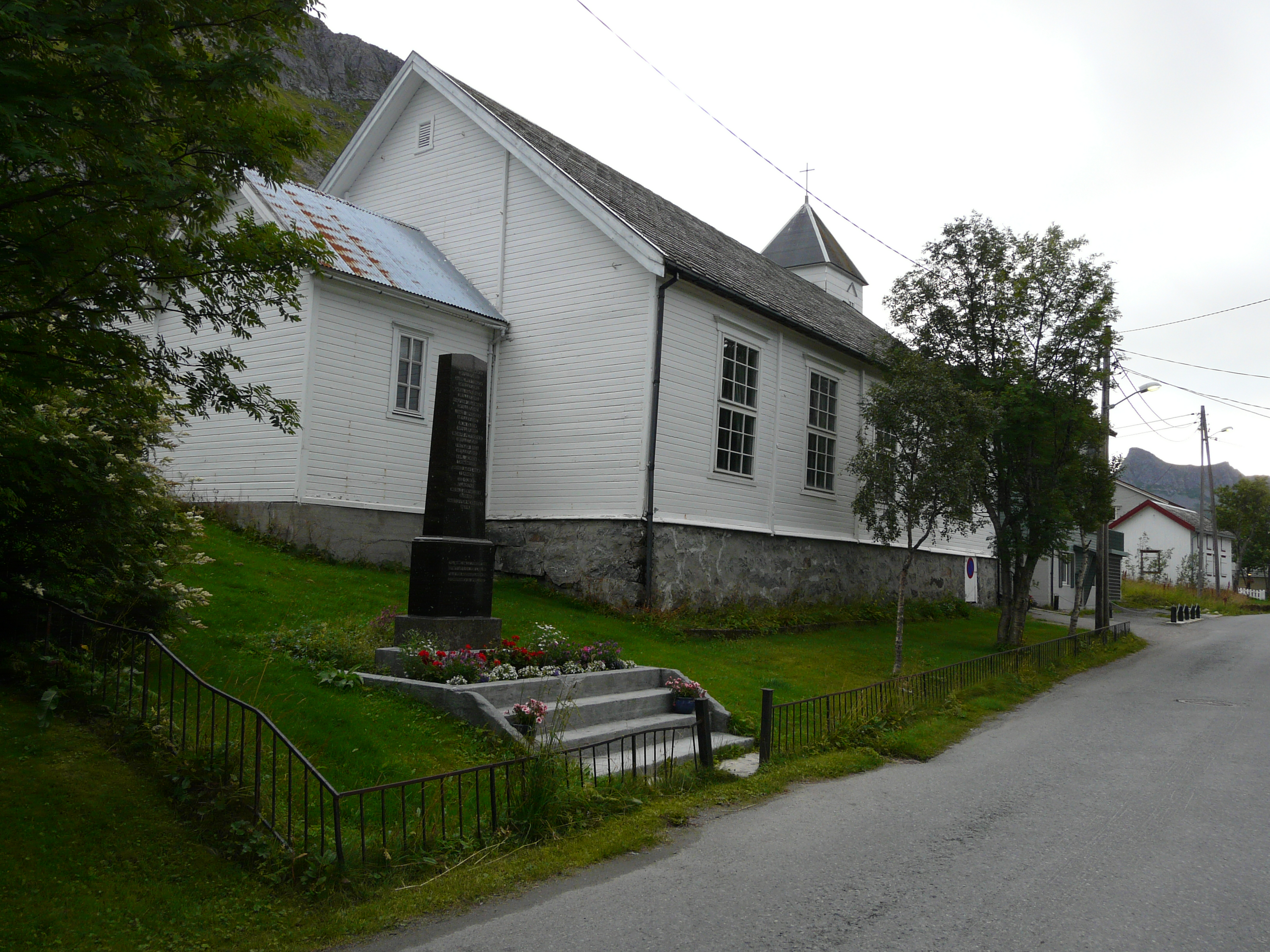
- View of the church
- Gryllefjord Chapel
- 69°21′43″N 17°03′25″E
- Location: Senja Municipality, Troms
- Country: Norway
- Denomination: Church of Norway
- Churchmanship: Evangelical Lutheran

History
- Status: Chapel
- Founded: Middle Ages
- Consecrated: 1939

Architecture
- Functional status: Active
- Architectural type: Long church
- Completed: 1902 (124 years ago)
- Closed: 1786-1939

Specifications
- Capacity: 150
- Materials: Wood

Administration
- Diocese: Nord-Hålogaland
- Deanery: Senja prosti
- Parish: Torsken
- Norwegian Cultural Heritage Site
- Type: Church
- Status: Not protected
- ID: 84438

Gryllefjord Chapel (Norwegian: Gryllefjord kapell) is a chapel of the Church of Norway in Senja Municipality in Troms county, Norway. It is located in the village of Gryllefjord on the west coast of the island of Senja. It is an annex chapel for the Torsken parish which is part of the Senja prosti (deanery) in the Diocese of Nord-Hålogaland. The white, wooden chapel was built in a long church style in 1938 by renovating an older building that was constructed in 1902 by an unknown architect. The chapel seats about 150 people.

== History ==
The earliest existing historical records of the church date back to the year 1589, but the church was not new that year. The first church in Gryllefjord was likely located about 200 metres (660 ft) east of the present church site. In 1641, the church was described as dilapidated and in poor condition. It was described the same way in historical records in 1753. According to local traditions, the church was torn down in 1786. The church was not replaced and villagers needed to travel by boat to the nearby village of Torsken where the Torsken Church was located. In 1938, a building in Gryllefjord was renovated and expanded and it was turned into a new Gryllefjord Chapel. The building had originally been built in 1902 as a fishermens' home. In 1938, it was enlarged by adding a sacristy, choir, and tower. It was consecrated in 1939.

== Media gallery ==
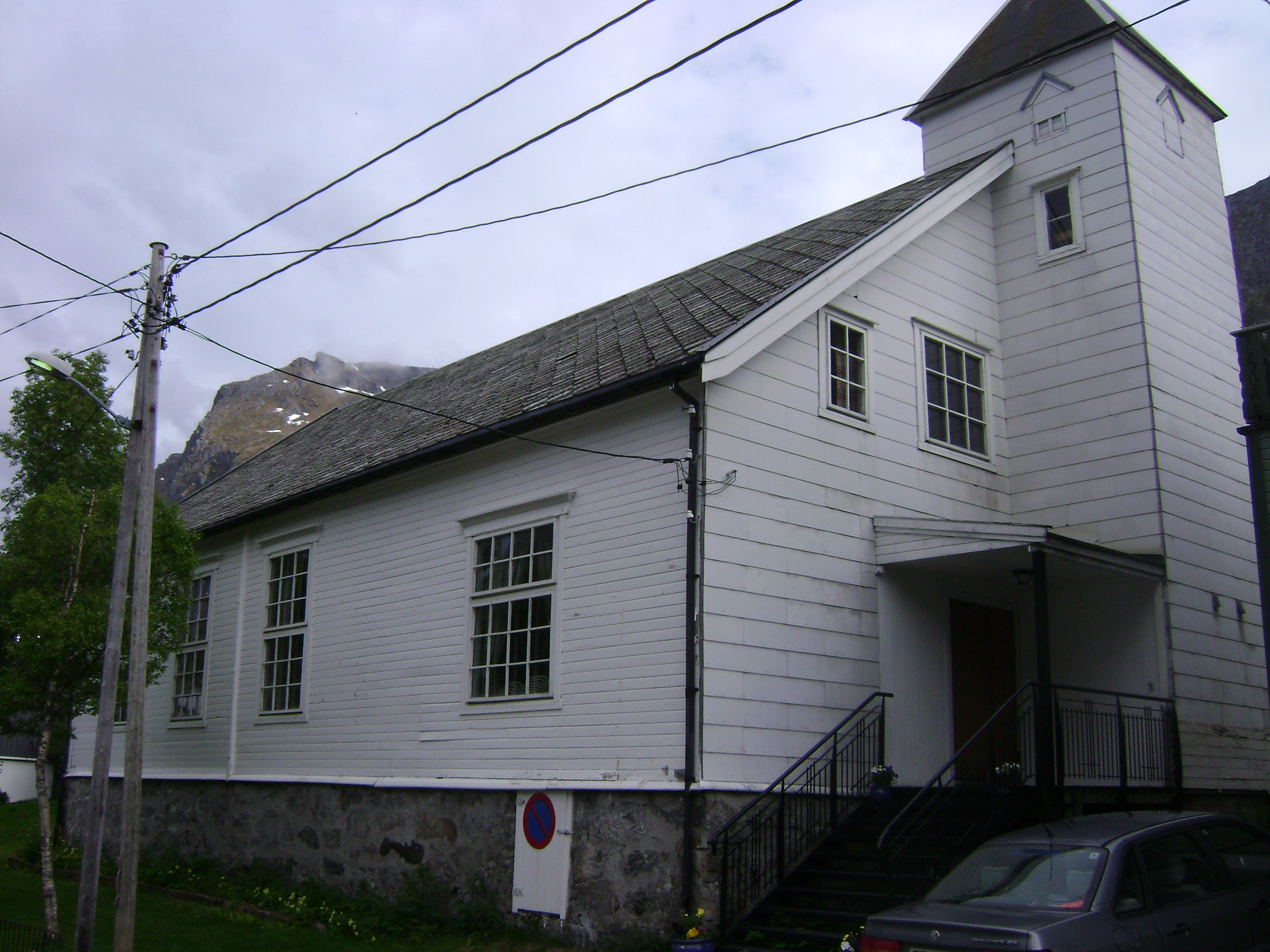

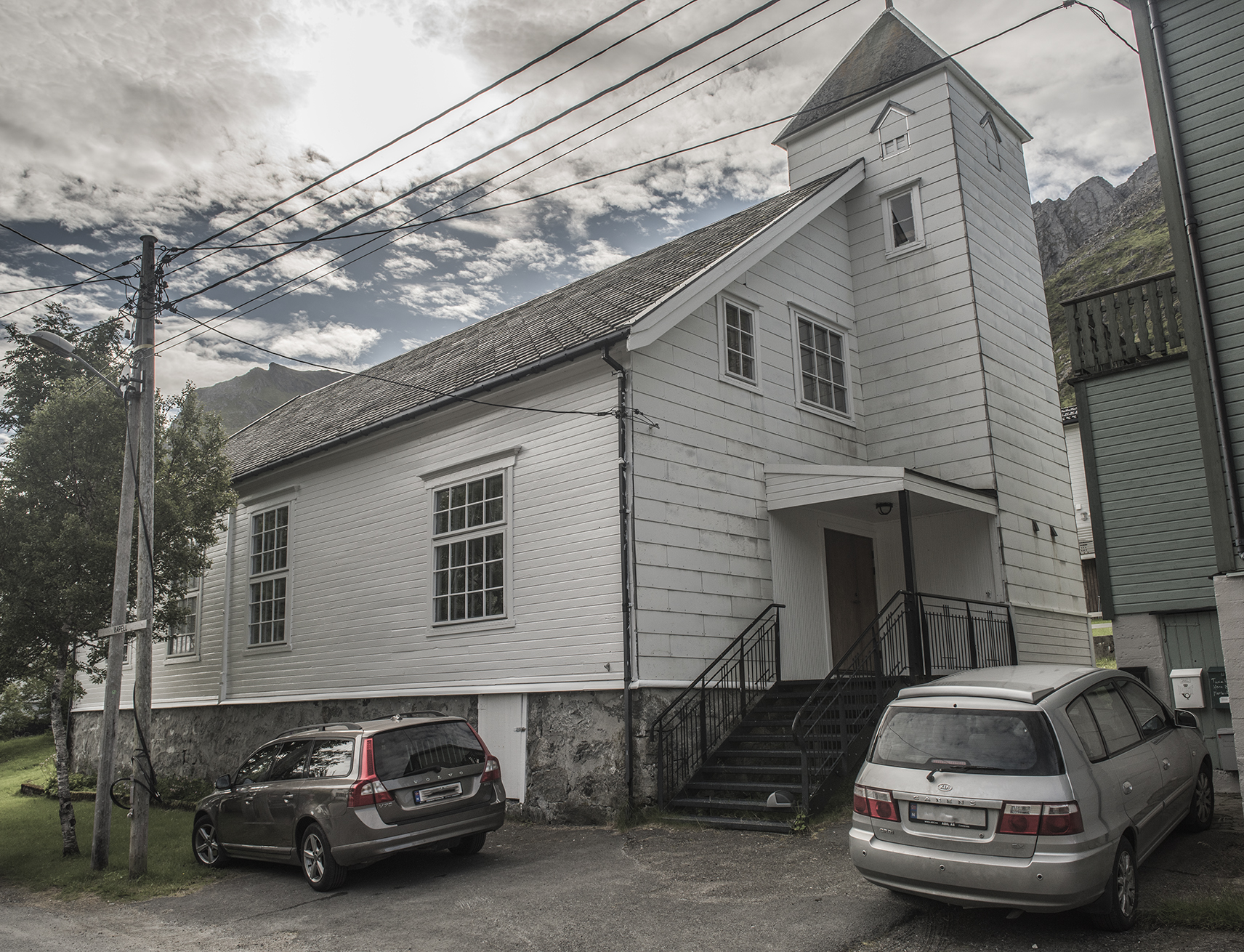

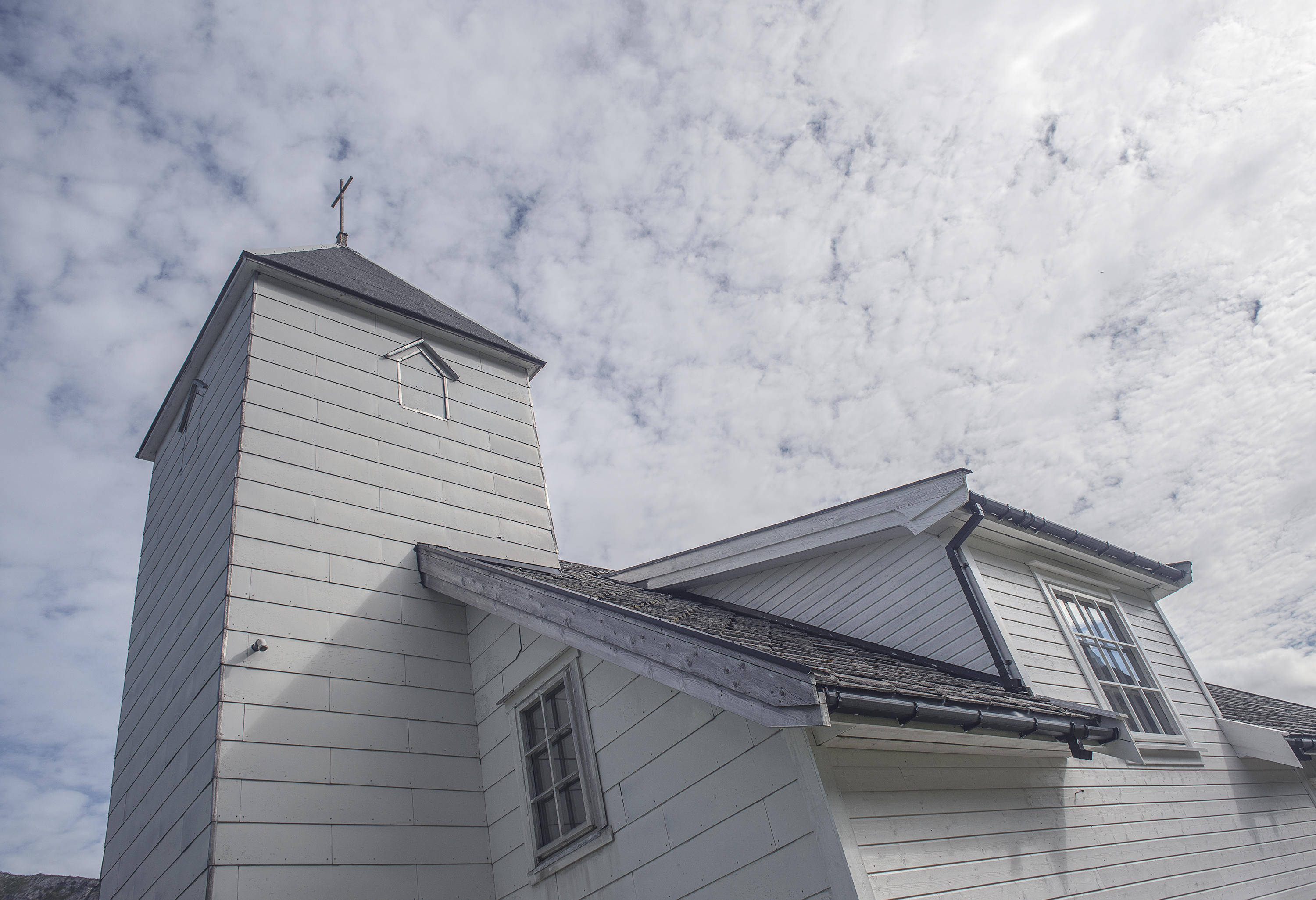

== See also ==
- List of churches in Nord-Hålogaland
