= Lemmingvær Landscape Conservation Area =

Protected area in Norway

Coordinates: 69°01′35″N 16°53′28″E

- Lemmingvær landskapsvernområde
- IUCN category IV (habitat/species management area)
- Interactive map of Lemmingvær Landscape Conservation Area
- Location: Senja Municipality, Norway
- Length: 1500
- Width: 650
- Max. elevation: 26
- Established: June 4, 2004

The Lemmingvær Landscape Conservation Area is a protected nature reserve in Senja Municipality, Norway, established to safeguard the unique landscape of Lemmingvær island and the surrounding islets and skerries, while protecting vital nesting and breeding habitats for regional coastal birds. To ensure wildlife protection during the critical breeding season, entry to the land and marine traffic near the archipelago is strictly prohibited from 1 May to 31 July.

== Description ==
The landscape conservation area characterized by flat grasslands, willow moist forests, and small birch trees in sheltered zones, with common cricket heath dominating drier areas, smaller sedge and poor bogs, and coastal salt meadows featuring abundant beach rye. The area serves as a vital nesting, wintering, and feather-felling (molting) ground for seabirds, particularly eiders, while its exposed mudflats and beach flats provide rich feeding grounds for waders, and the local forests and meadows support various passerines alongside a common resident otter population. Historically, wildlife records show a colony of 75 pairs of herring gulls in 1985, which expanded by 1990 to over 500 pairs of nesting seabirds including gray gulls, black-backed gulls, herring gulls, teal, eiders, greylag geese, and herring ducks, with red-billed terns also breeding in select years.

== History ==
The landscape of Lemmingvær is deeply shaped by its agricultural and maritime past, having formally operated as a traditional egg and down harvest area with continuous human settlement recorded on the island from 1567 until 1967. The island historically sustained between two to five families, leaving behind an intensively used agricultural footprint marked by an old earth-and-stone field fence on the western side of the farms and a historical farm mound at the Vestberg farm that dates back to the Middle Ages. While the oldest remaining standing structures date to the 1880s—with the island today containing two cabins, four farmhouses, a barn, outbuildings, outdoor sheds, well houses, and boathouses—its cultural heritage is further preserved at the Sør-Senja Village Museum on Hofsøya, where a large traditional boat boathouse and storehouse from the island were relocated for public display.
