= Aglapsvik =

Village in Senja Municipality, Norway

- Village
- Interactive map of Aglapsvik
- Location within Troms Location within Norway
- Coordinates: 69°27′46″N 18°12′40″E
- Country: Norway
- Region: Northern Norway
- County: Troms
- District: Midt-Troms
- Municipality: Senja Municipality
- Elevation: 9 m (30 ft)
- Time zone: UTC+01:00 (CET)
  - Summer (DST): UTC+02:00 (CEST)
- Post Code: 9300 Finnsnes

Aglapsvik is a small, isolated, coastal village in Senja Municipality in Troms county in Northern Norway. It is located along the Malangen fjord, about 35 km (22 mi) north of the town of Finnsnes. The name of the village comes from the nearby mountain Aglapen. The area is mostly hilly and forested and there is one small road (County Road 263) passing through. There are about 50 residents.
