= Sandbakken Chapel =

- Sandbakken kapell
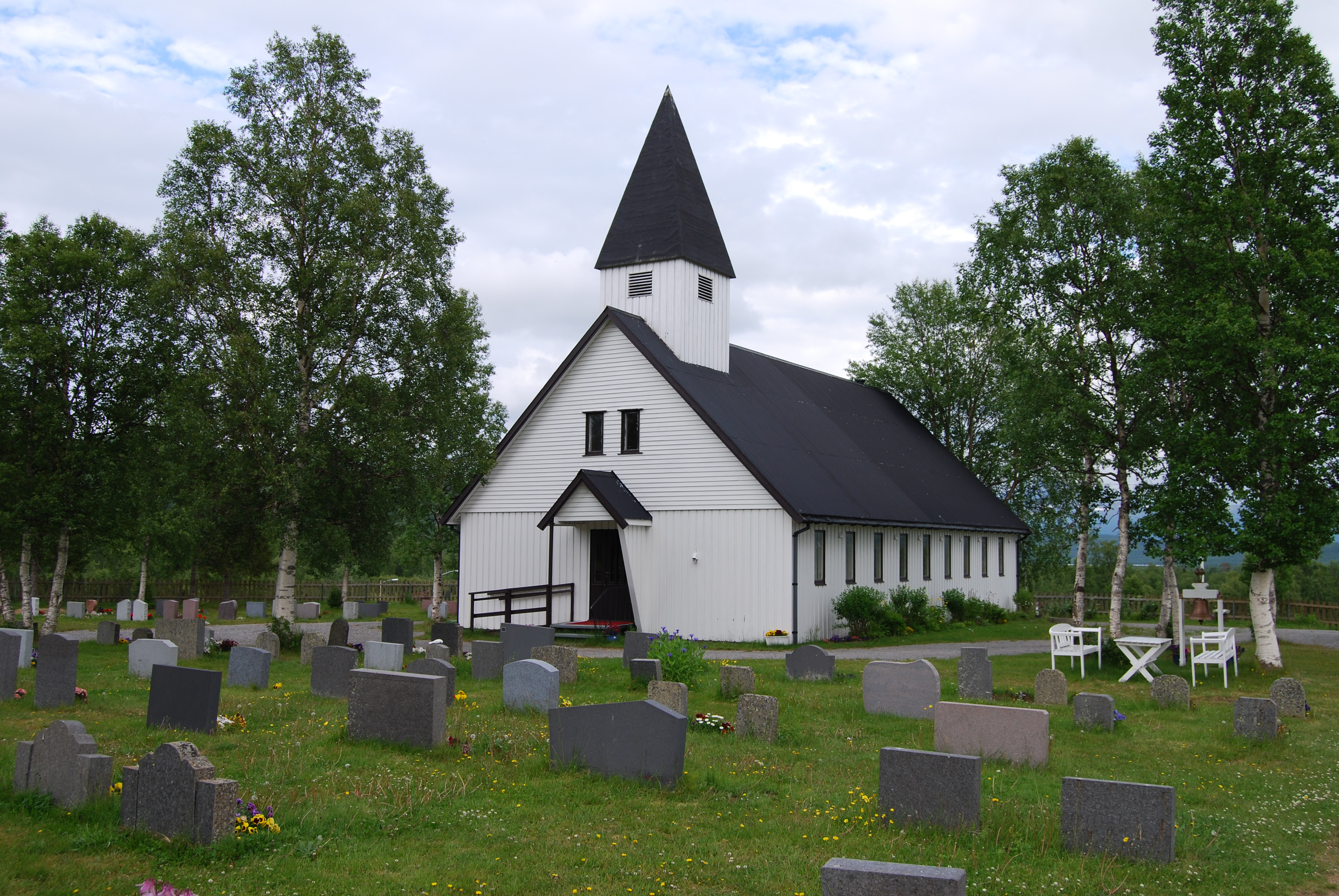
- View of the chapel
- Sandbakken Chapel
- 69.2920460°N 17.7384524°E
- Location: Senja Municipality, Troms
- Country: Norway
- Denomination: Church of Norway
- Churchmanship: Evangelical Lutheran

History
- Status: Chapel

Architecture
- Functional status: Active
- Architect: Torgeir Renland
- Architectural type: Long church
- Completed: 1974 (52 years ago)

Specifications
- Capacity: 148
- Materials: Wood

Administration
- Diocese: Nord-Hålogaland
- Deanery: Senja prosti
- Parish: Lenvik
- Norwegian Cultural Heritage Site
- Type: Church
- Status: Not protected
- ID: 85375

Sandbakken Chapel (Norwegian: Sandbakken kapell) is a chapel of the Church of Norway in Senja Municipality in Troms county, Norway. It is located in the village of Sandbakken on the island of Senja. It is an annex chapel for the Lenvik parish which is part of the Senja prosti (deanery) in the Diocese of Nord-Hålogaland. The white, wooden chapel was built in a long church style in 1976 using plans drawn up by the architect Torgeir Renland. The chapel seats about 148 people.

== See also ==
- List of churches in Nord-Hålogaland
