= Gibostad Chapel =

- Gibostad kapell
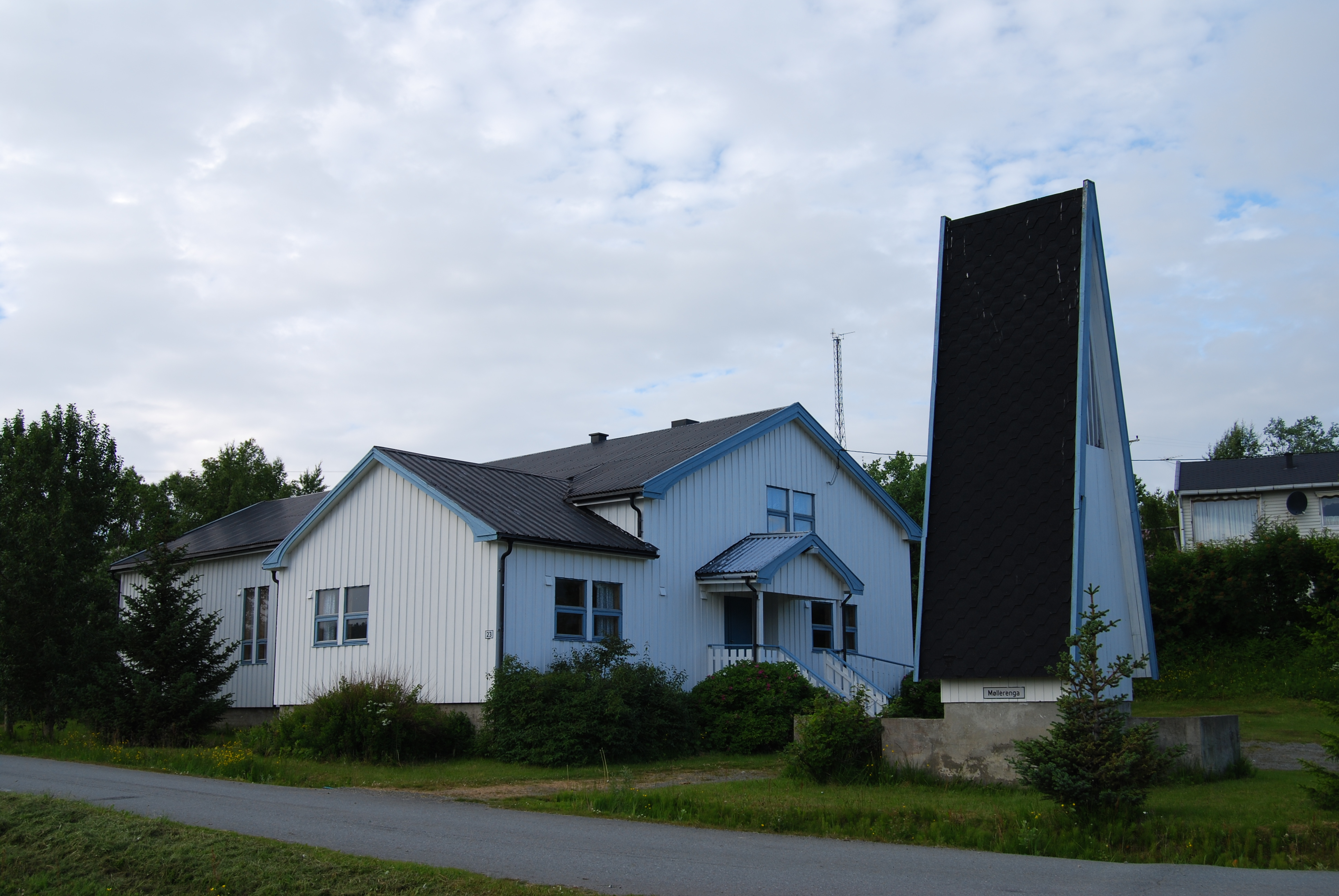
- View of the chapel
- Gibostad Chapel
- 69.3551932°N 18.0656916°E
- Location: Senja Municipality, Troms
- Country: Norway
- Denomination: Church of Norway
- Churchmanship: Evangelical Lutheran

History
- Status: Chapel

Architecture
- Functional status: Active
- Architect: Viggo Ditlefsen
- Architectural type: Long church
- Completed: 1939 (87 years ago)

Specifications
- Capacity: 110
- Materials: Wood

Administration
- Diocese: Nord-Hålogaland
- Deanery: Senja prosti
- Parish: Lenvik

Gibostad Chapel (Norwegian: Gibostad kapell) is a chapel of the Church of Norway in Senja Municipality in Troms county, Norway. It is located in the village of Gibostad on the east coast of the island of Senja. It is an annex chapel for the Lenvik parish which is part of the Senja prosti (deanery) in the Diocese of Nord-Hålogaland. The white, wooden chapel was built in a long church style in 1939 as a bygdehus, but in 1982 it was upgraded to an official chapel. The chapel seats about 110 people.

== See also ==
- List of churches in Nord-Hålogaland
