= Andenes–Gryllefjord Ferry =

Automobile ferry connecting the islands of Andøya and Senja in Norway

- Waterway: Andfjorden
- Transit type: Double-ended
- Carries: Automobiles and passengers
- Terminals: Andenes; Gryllefjord
- Operator: Troms fylkestrafikk
- Authority: Norwegian Public Roads Administration
- Frequency: 3 times daily

Andenes–Gryllefjord Ferry is an automobile ferry service connecting the islands of Andøya (in Nordland county) and Senja (in Troms county) in Norway. Operated by Troms fylkestrafikk, the crossing between the villages of Andenes in Andøy Municipality and Gryllefjord in Senja Municipality takes 1 hour and 40 minutes. The service is only operated from late May until late August, and it has three crossings per day.

The 37-kilometre (23 mi) long crossing is part of County Road 82, although the road continues as County Road 86 at Gryllestad. Both routes are classified as National Tourist Routes.
