= Lysbotn Chapel =

- Lysbotn kapell
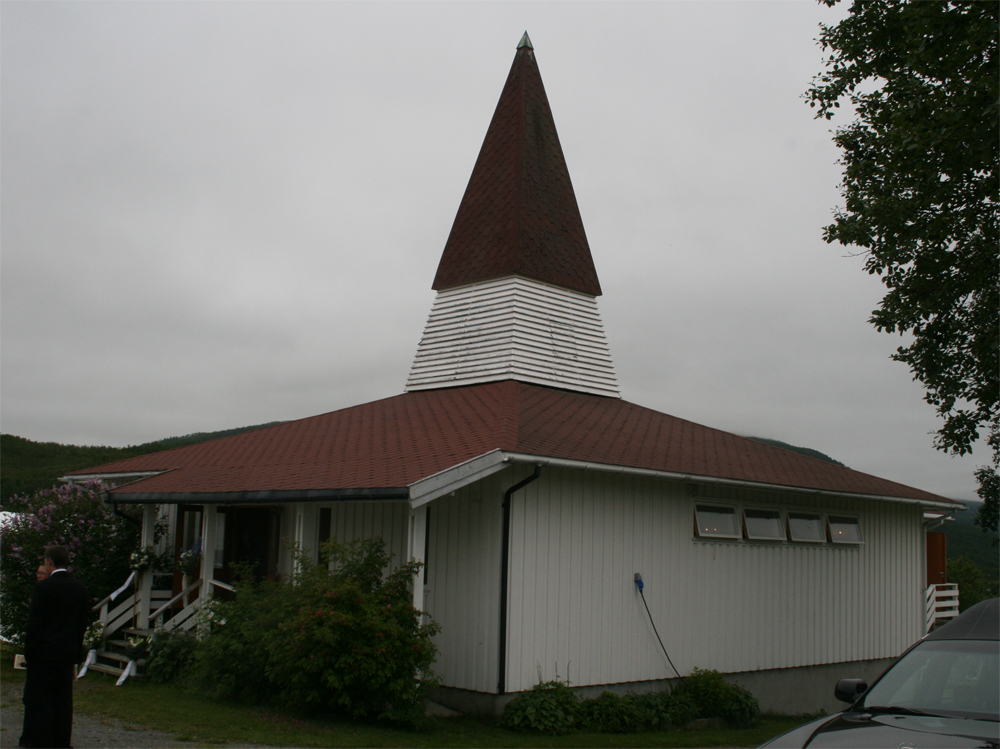
- View of the chapel
- Lysbotn Chapel
- 69.4231645°N 17.9493829°E
- Location: Senja Municipality, Troms
- Country: Norway
- Denomination: Church of Norway
- Churchmanship: Evangelical Lutheran

History
- Status: Chapel

Architecture
- Functional status: Active
- Architect: Gaute Baalsrud
- Architectural type: Fan-shaped
- Completed: 1970 (56 years ago)

Specifications
- Capacity: 120
- Materials: Wood

Administration
- Diocese: Nord-Hålogaland
- Deanery: Senja prosti
- Parish: Lenvik
- Norwegian Cultural Heritage Site
- Type: Church
- Status: Not protected
- ID: 84354

Lysbotn Chapel (Norwegian: Lysbotn kapell) is a chapel of the Church of Norway in Senja Municipality in Troms county, Norway. It is located south of the village of Lysnes on the eastern side of the island of Senja. It is an annex chapel for the Lenvik parish which is part of the Senja prosti (deanery) in the Diocese of Nord-Hålogaland. The white, wooden chapel was built in a fan-shaped style in 1970 using plans drawn up by the architect Gaute Baalsrud. The chapel seats about 120 people.

== See also ==
- List of churches in Nord-Hålogaland
