= Medby Chapel =

- Medby kapell
- Medby Chapel
- 69.2811126°N 17.0469284°E
- Location: Senja Municipality, Troms
- Country: Norway
- Denomination: Church of Norway
- Churchmanship: Evangelical Lutheran

History
- Status: Chapel
- Founded: 1890
- Consecrated: 29 Aug 1937

Architecture
- Functional status: Active
- Architectural type: Long church
- Completed: 1937 (89 years ago)

Specifications
- Capacity: 170
- Materials: Wood

Administration
- Diocese: Nord-Hålogaland
- Deanery: Senja prosti
- Parish: Torsken
- Norwegian Cultural Heritage Site
- Type: Church
- Status: Not protected
- ID: 84925

Medby Chapel (Norwegian: Medby kapell) is a chapel of the Church of Norway in Senja Municipality in Troms county, Norway. It is located in the village of Medby on the west coast of the island of Senja. It is an annex chapel for the Torsken parish which is part of the Senja prosti (deanery) in the Diocese of Nord-Hålogaland. The white, wooden chapel was built in a long church style in 1937. The chapel seats about 170 people.

== History ==
The church was first built on the island of Holmenvær, an island located about 11 kilometres (6.8 mi) west of Medby. Holmenvær was one of the largest fishing villages in the region and this church was built there in 1890. The church was in use there until about 1933. After motorized boats became more common, fishermen left Holmenvær to live in larger settlements on the main island of Senja. Eventually, the church was no longer used and it was decided that it would be moved to Medby on Senja island. The church was moved and rebuilt and then consecrated on 29 August 1937. The church was enlarged and renovated in 1967.

== See also ==
- List of churches in Nord-Hålogaland
