= Skipsfjorden, Karlsøy =

Fjord in Troms, Norway

Skipsfjorden (Norwegian); Skihččavuotna (Northern Sami)
- Skipfjorden (alternate name)
- Interactive map of the fjord
- Location: Troms county, Norway
- Coordinates: 70.1990°N 19.7870°E
- Type: Fjord
- Basin countries: Norway
- Max. length: 6 kilometres (3.7 mi)

Skipsfjorden or Skipfjorden (Norwegian) or Skihččavuotna (Northern Sami) is a fjord or bay in Karlsøy Municipality in Troms county, Norway. The 6-kilometre (3.7 mi) long fjord cuts into the island of Vanna and it flows out into the Fugløyfjorden to the north.

The mouth of the fjord stretches from the mountain Kuhammaren on the west to the Skotallneset peninsula on the east. There are some farms in the inner part of the Skipsfjorden, but none of them have road access to the rest of the island. Some of the farms include Røyrnes, Skipsfjord, and Sandmo. The west side of the fjord is especially high and steep with the 609-metre (1,998 ft) tall mountain Kvalkjeften rising right out of the water and forming a cliff.
