= Skipsfjorden, Dønna =

Fjord in Nordland, Norway

Skipsfjorden
- Interactive map of the fjord
- Location: Nordland county, Norway
- Coordinates: 66.1683°N 12.6583°E
- Type: Fjord
- Basin countries: Norway
- Max. length: 5.5 kilometres (3.4 mi)

Skipsfjorden is an arm of the Stifjorden in Dønna Municipality in Nordland county, Norway. The 5.5-kilometre (3.4 mi) long fjord (more accurately it is a strait) lies between the island of Dønna on the west and the island of Løkta in the east.

At it northern end, it flows between Vardhaugneset on the island of Dønna and Jordfastholmen on the island of Løkta. The village of Glein on Donna is on the western side of the fjord. At its southern end, it passes between Gullsneset on the west and Koppardal on the east. From Koppardal there is a ferry south to the village of Bjørn, on the island of Dønna.

County roads Fv186 and Fv189 partly run along the western side of the fjord.
