= Flakstadvåg =

Village in Senja Municipality, Norway

- Village
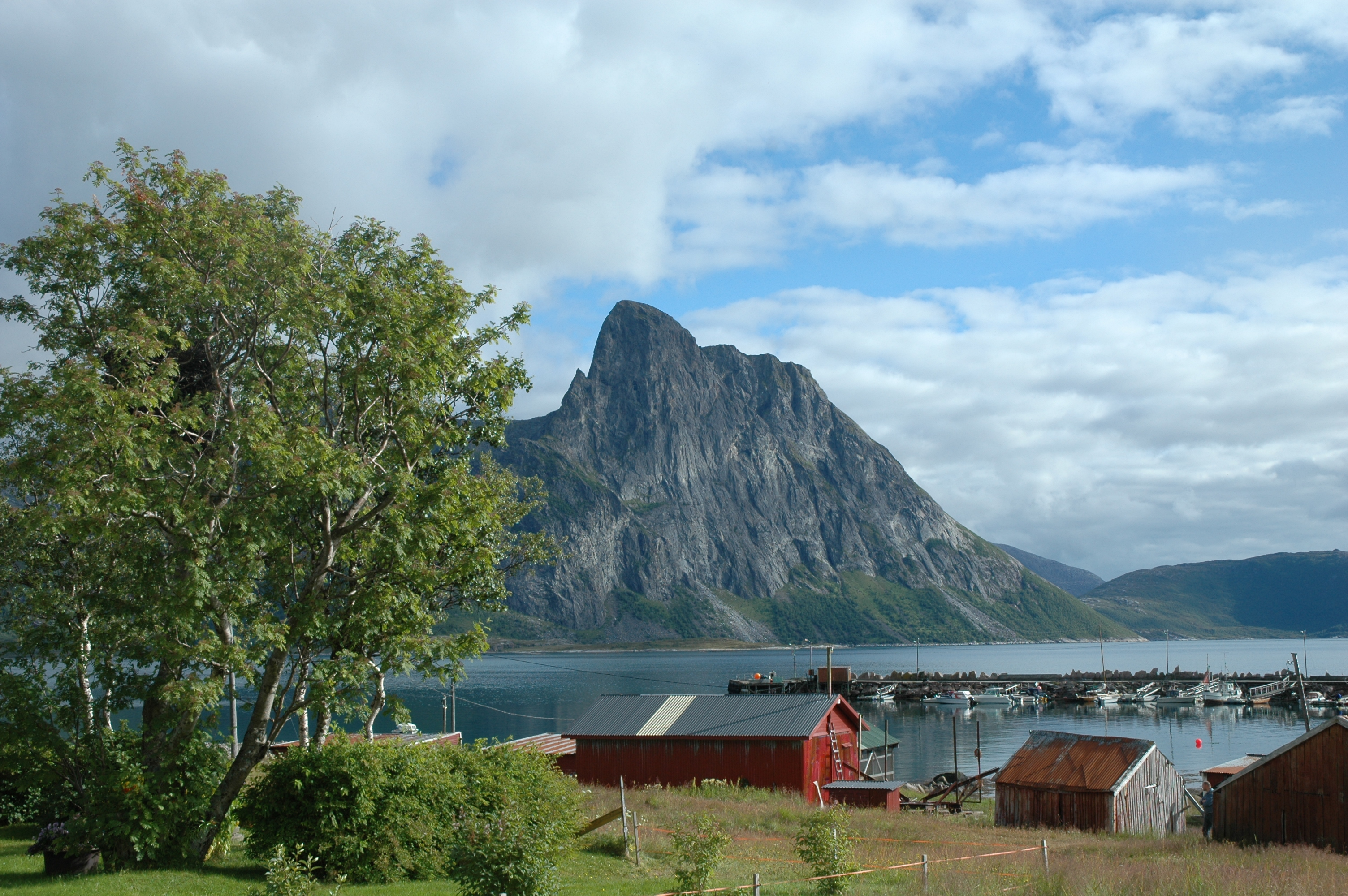
- View of the village
- Interactive map of Flakstadvåg
- Location within Troms Location within Norway
- Coordinates: 69°11′24″N 17°01′58″E
- Country: Norway
- Region: Northern Norway
- County: Troms
- District: Midt-Troms
- Municipality: Senja Municipality
- Elevation: 3 m (9.8 ft)
- Time zone: UTC+01:00 (CET)
  - Summer (DST): UTC+02:00 (CEST)
- Post Code: 9393 Flakstadvåg

Flakstadvåg is a village in Senja Municipality in Troms county, Norway. It is located along the Selfjorden on the southwestern part of the island of Senja. It is surrounded by the fjord, mountains, and a marsh. There is one road connection to the village from the outside world. Ånderdalen National Park lies just to the northeast of the village. Flakstadvåg Chapel is located here.
