= Medby =

Village in Senja Municipality, Norway

- Village
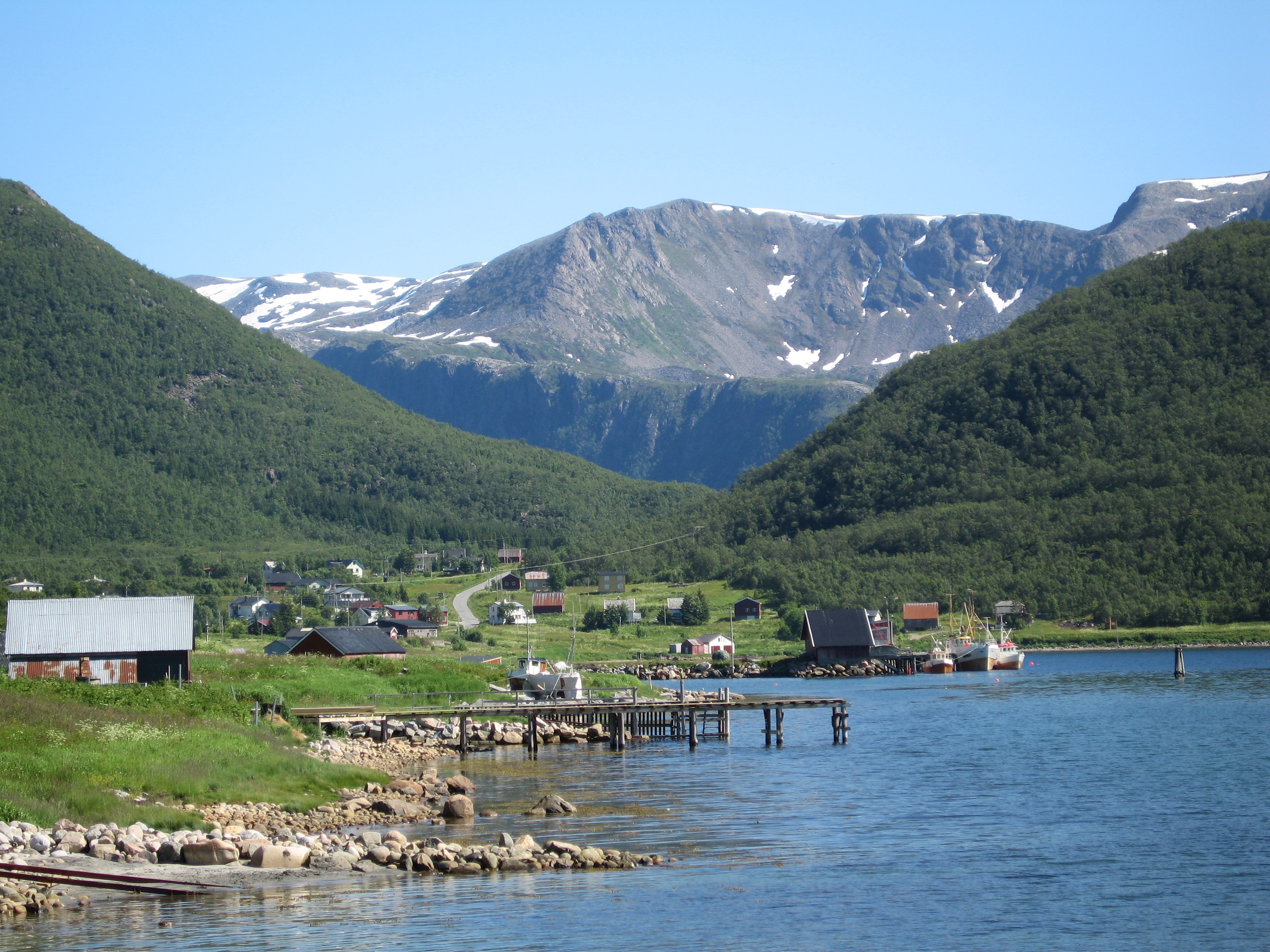
- View of the village
- Interactive map of Medby
- Location within Troms Location within Norway
- Coordinates: 69°16′53″N 17°03′32″E
- Country: Norway
- Region: Northern Norway
- County: Troms
- District: Midt-Troms
- Municipality: Senja Municipality
- Elevation: 13 m (43 ft)
- Time zone: UTC+01:00 (CET)
  - Summer (DST): UTC+02:00 (CEST)
- Post Code: 9395 Kaldfarnes

Medby is a village in Senja Municipality in Troms county, Norway. It is located along the Veidmannsfjorden on the southwestern part of the island of Senja. The village lies along a highway that connects the villages of Grunnfarnes and Sifjord. The Kaldfarnes area lies just to the west of Medby and Ånderdalen National Park lies about 5 kilometres (3.1 mi) to the east of the village. Medby Chapel is located in this village.
