= Flakstadvåg Chapel =

- Flakstadvåg kapell
- Flakstadvåg Chapel
- 69.1902°N 17.0330°E
- Location: Senja Municipality, Troms
- Country: Norway
- Denomination: Church of Norway
- Churchmanship: Evangelical Lutheran

History
- Status: Chapel
- Consecrated: 17 June 1926

Architecture
- Functional status: Active
- Architectural type: Long church
- Completed: 1925 (101 years ago)

Specifications
- Capacity: 150
- Materials: Wood

Administration
- Diocese: Nord-Hålogaland
- Deanery: Senja prosti
- Parish: Torsken
- Norwegian Cultural Heritage Site
- Type: Church
- Status: Not protected
- ID: 84157

Flakstadvåg Chapel (Norwegian: Flakstadvåg kapell) is a chapel of the Church of Norway in Senja Municipality in Troms county, Norway. It is located in the village of Flakstadvåg on the west coast of the island of Senja. It is an annex chapel for the Torsken parish which is part of the Senja prosti (deanery) in the Diocese of Nord-Hålogaland. The white, wooden chapel was built in a long church style in 1925 by an unknown architect. The chapel seats about 150 people.

== History ==
The chapel was originally located on the Norwegian island of Hallvardsøya, south of Flakstadvåg in what is now part of the Tranøy Municipality. The chapel was built on the island by Anton Nilsen to serve the fishermen living there. When he died in the year 1904, he left about 5000 kr to support the church there. As the population on the island dwindled and the church was deteriorating due to very little maintenance, the decision was made to move it to the nearby village of Flakstadvåg on the island of Senja. After moving it to its new location, it was consecrated on 17 June 1926.

== See also ==
- List of churches in Nord-Hålogaland
