= Skipsfjorden, Senja =

Fjord in Troms county, Norway

Skipsfjorden
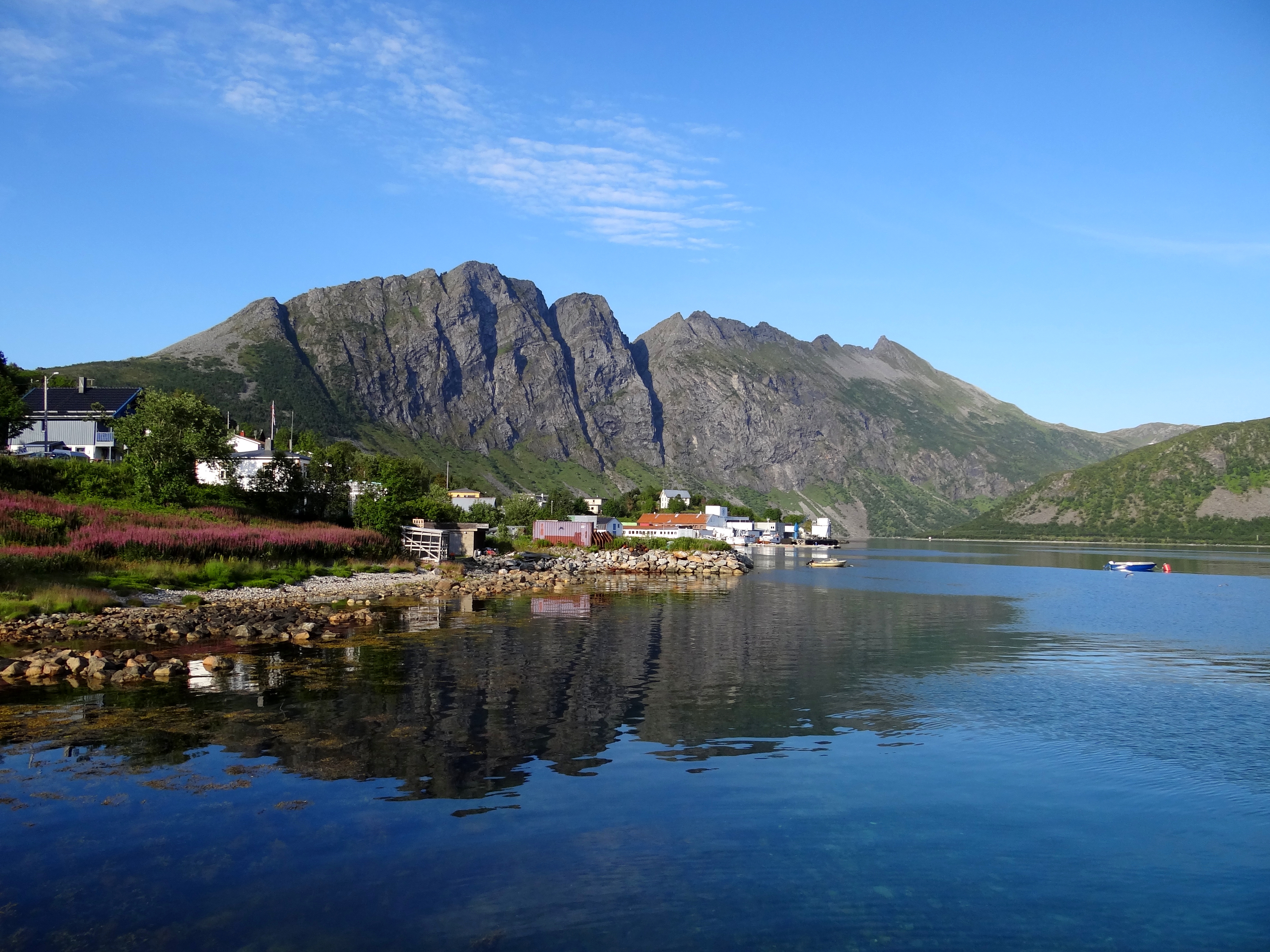
- View of the fjord in the background
- Interactive map of the fjord
- Location: Troms county, Norway
- Coordinates: 69.3418°N 17.1374°E
- Type: Fjord
- Basin countries: Norway
- Max. length: 1.5 kilometres (0.93 mi)
- Max. width: 500 metres (1,600 ft)
- Settlements: Torsken

Skipsfjorden is a branch of the Torskenfjorden in Senja Municipality on the western coast of the large island of Senja in Troms county, Norway.

The mouth of the fjord lies between Selneset on the west and Galgeneset on the east. The fjord runs about 1.5 kilometres (0.93 mi) in a roughly eastwards direction to Skipsfjordbotn.

The village of Torsken is located at Selneset at the mouth of the fjord. The mountain Skipstinden lies on the north side of the fjord and it climbs steeply to 576 metres (1,890 ft) above sea level although its highest peak (715 metres or 2,346 feet above sea level) lies a little to the northeast of the inlet.

== See also ==
- List of Norwegian fjords
