= Gryllefjord =

Village in Senja Municipality, Norway

Gryllefjord: Gryllefjord (Norwegian); Grullefierda (Northern Sami)
- Village
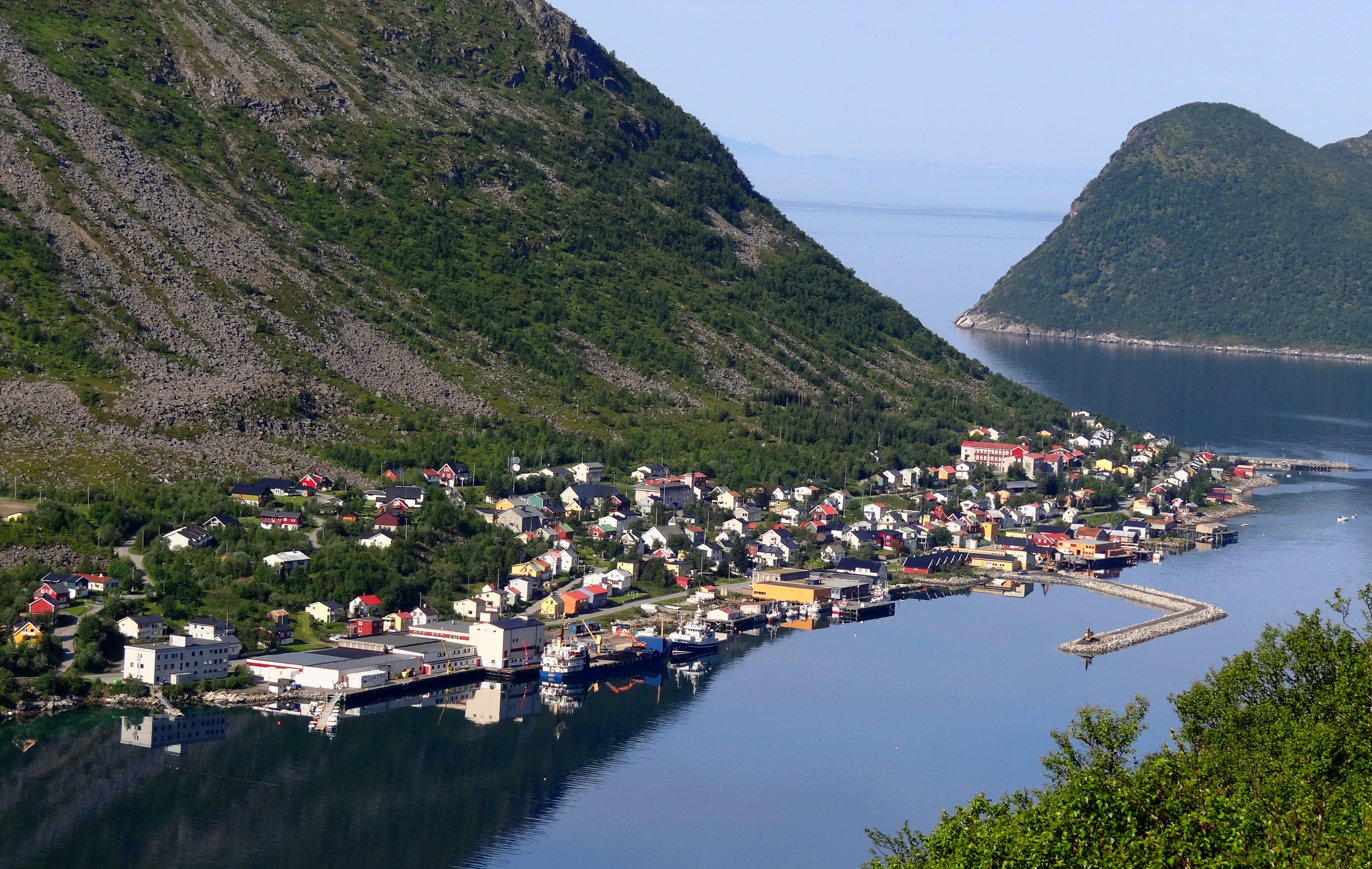
- View of the village
- Interactive map of Gryllefjord
- Location within Troms Location within Norway
- Coordinates: 69°21′46″N 17°03′10″E
- Country: Norway
- Region: Northern Norway
- County: Troms
- District: Midt-Troms
- Municipality: Senja Municipality

Area
  - Total: 0.25 km^{2} (0.097 sq mi)
- Elevation: 3 m (9.8 ft)

Population (2023)
  - Total: 325
  - Density: 1,300/km^{2} (3,400/sq mi)
- Time zone: UTC+01:00 (CET)
  - Summer (DST): UTC+02:00 (CEST)
- Post Code: 9380 Gryllefjord

Gryllefjord (Norwegian) or Grullefierda (Northern Sami) is a fishing village in Senja Municipality in Troms county, Norway. It is located on the island of Senja, along the Gryllefjorden in the northern part of the municipality. The 0.25-square-kilometre (62-acre) village has a population (2023) of 325 and a population density of 1,300 inhabitants per square kilometre (3,400/sq mi).

The Andenes–Gryllefjord Ferry, is a car ferry service that runs during the summer to Andenes on the island of Andøya. The village is connected by road to the village of Torsken, about 4 kilometres (2.5 mi) south, and to the town of Finnsnes, about 60 kilometres (37 mi) east.

The village was the administrative centre of the old Torsken Municipality which existed until 1 January 2020 when it was merged into Senja Municipality.

There is one nursing home in the village (as of 2021).

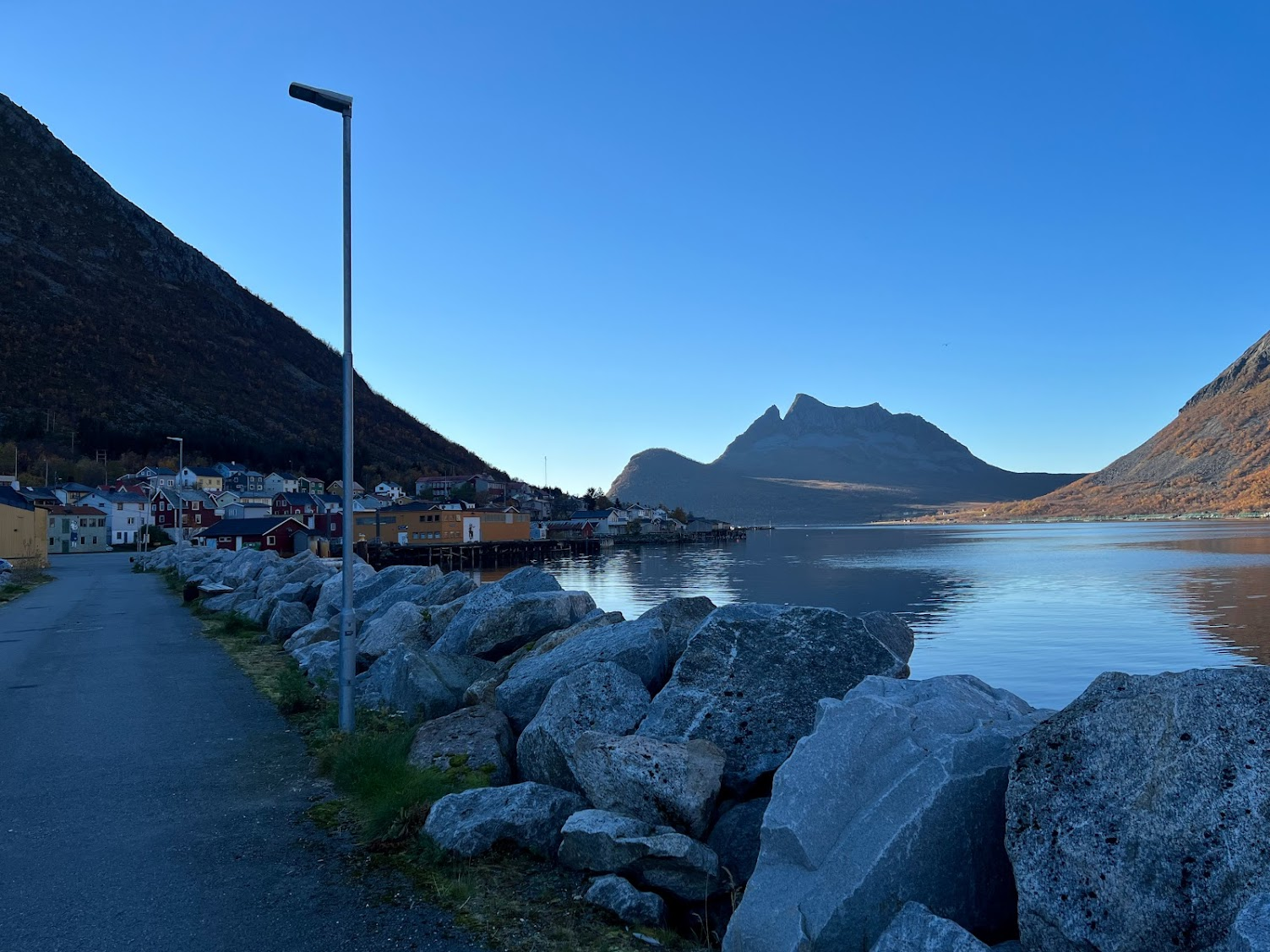
View of Gryllefjord with the mouth of the fjord in the distance.
