= Senja Municipality =

Municipality in Troms, Norway

Senja Municipality Senja kommune
- Municipality
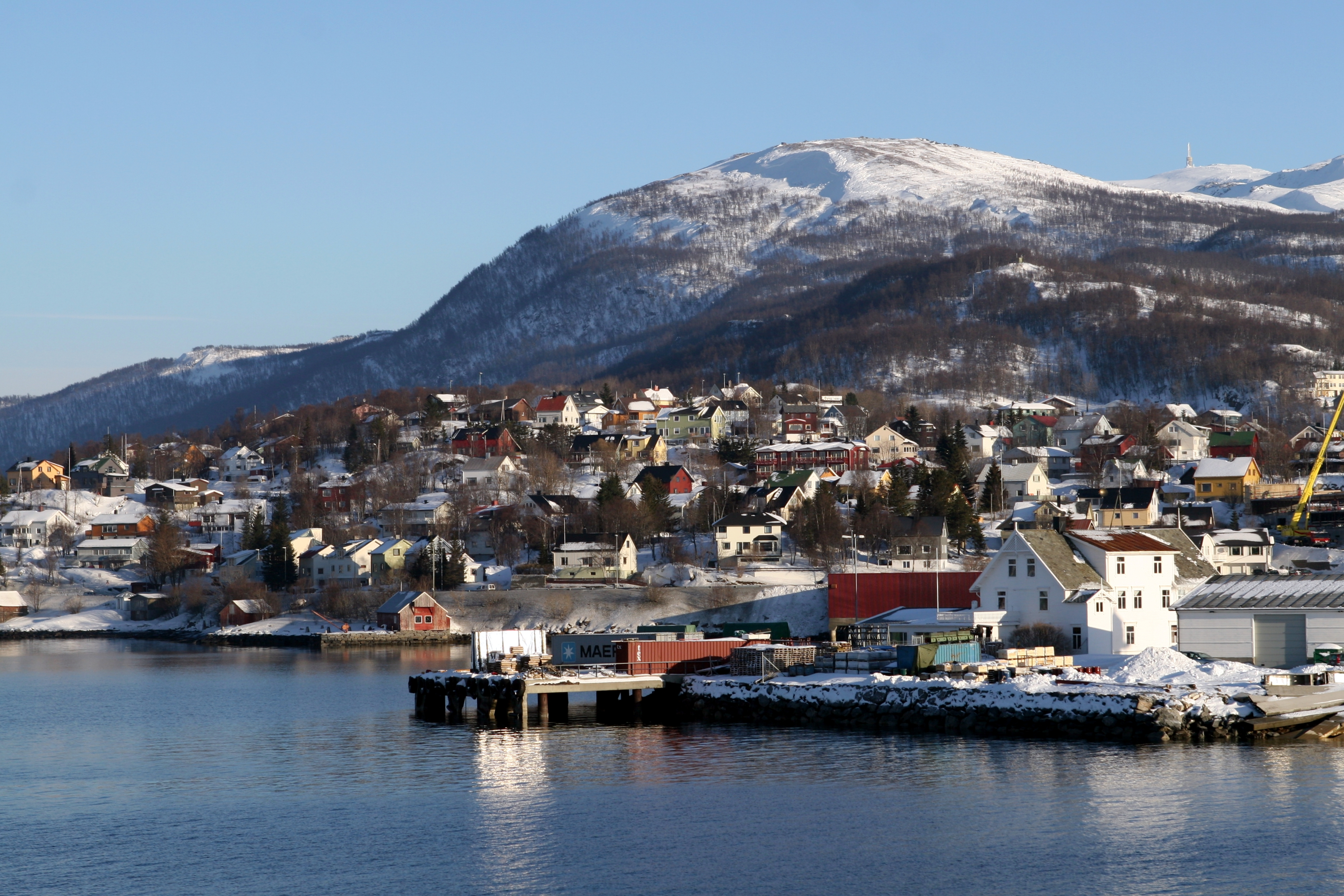
- View of Finnsnes in Senja

- Coat of arms

- Troms within Norway

- Senja within Troms
- Coordinates: 69.0806°N 16.8031°E
- Country: Norway
- County: Troms
- District: Hålogaland
- Established: 1 Jan 2020
  - Preceded by: Berg, Tranøy, Torsken, and Lenvik
- Administrative centre: Finnsnes

Government
  - Mayor (2023): Geir-Inge Sivertsen (H)

Area
  - Total: 1,946.09 km^{2} (751.39 sq mi)
  - Land: 1,860.90 km^{2} (718.50 sq mi)
  - Water: 85.19 km^{2} (32.89 sq mi) 4.4%
  - Rank: #40 in Norway
- Highest elevation: 1,202.4 m (3,945 ft)

Population (2024)
  - Total: 14,894
  - Rank: #83 in Norway
  - Density: 7.7/km^{2} (20/sq mi)
  - Change (10 years): ▲ +0.2%
- Demonym(s): Senjaværing; Senjeværing

Official language
  - Norwegian form: Neutral
- Time zone: UTC+01:00 (CET)
  - Summer (DST): UTC+02:00 (CEST)
- ISO 3166 code: NO-5530
- Website: Official website

Senja is a municipality in Troms county, Norway. It was established on 1 January 2020 when the municipalities of Berg, Lenvik, Torsken, and Tranøy were merged into one municipality. It is located in the traditional district of Hålogaland. The administrative centre of the municipality is the town of Finnsnes. Some of the notable villages in Senja include Å, Aglapsvik, Bjorelvnes, Botnhamn, Finnsæter, Fjordgård, Flakstadvåg, Gibostad, Gryllefjord, Husøy, Langnes, Laukhella, Lysnes, Medby, Mefjordvær, Rossfjordstraumen, Sandbakken, Senjahopen, Silsand, Skaland, Skrollsvika, Stonglandseidet, Torsken, and Vangsvik.

The municipality includes all of the island of Senja, the smaller surrounding islands, and part of the mainland between the Gisundet strait and the Malangen fjord. The 1,946-square-kilometre (751 sq mi) municipality is the 40th largest by area out of the 357 municipalities in Norway. Senja is the 83rd most populous municipality in Norway with a population of 14,894. The municipality's population density is 7.7 inhabitants per square kilometre (20/sq mi) and its population has increased by 0.2% over the previous 10-year period.

== General information ==
In March 2017, the Parliament of Norway voted to merge the municipalities of Berg, Lenvik, Torsken, and Tranøy. The new municipality was established on 1 January 2020 as Senja Municipality (Norwegian: Senja kommune).

On 1 January 2024, the large Troms og Finnmark county was divided and the municipality became part of the newly re-created Troms county.

=== Etymology ===
The Old Norse form of the name must also have been Senja or perhaps Sændja. The meaning of the name is unknown, but it might be related to the verb sundra which means to "tear" or "split apart", possibly because the west coast of the island is torn and split by numerous small fjords. It might also be derived from a Proto-Norse form of the word Sandijōn meaning "(area) of sand" or "sandy island".

=== Coat of arms ===
The coat of arms was approved for use starting on 1 January 2020. The blazon is "Azure, northern lights vert over mountain peaks argent to sinister" (Norwegian: I mørkeblått grønt nordlys oppe og sølv fjell nede heraldisk venstre). This means the arms have a dark blue field (background) and the charge is the green northern lights above some mountain peaks. The mountain peaks have a tincture of argent which means they are commonly colored white, but if it is made out of metal, then silver is used. The mountain peak is a depiction of the Okshornan mountain.

=== Churches ===
The Church of Norway has four parishes (sokn) within Senja Municipality. It is part of the Senja prosti (deanery) in the Diocese of Nord-Hålogaland.

Churches in Senja Municipality
Parish (sokn)	Church name	Location of the church	Year built
Berg	Berg Church	Skaland	1955
Berg	Finnsæter Chapel	Finnsæter	1982
Berg	Mefjordvær Chapel	Mefjordvær	1916
Lenvik	Finnsnes Church	Finnsnes	1979
Lenvik	Lenvik Church	Bjorelvnes	1879
Lenvik	Rossfjord Church	Rossfjordstraumen	1822
Lenvik	Fjordgård Chapel	Fjordgård	1976
Lenvik	Gibostad Chapel	Gibostad	1939
Lenvik	Husøy Chapel	Husøy i Senja	1957
Lenvik	Lysbotn Chapel	Lysnes	1970
Lenvik	Sandbakken Chapel	Sandbakken	1974
Torsken	Torsken Church	Torsken	1784
Torsken	Flakkstadvåg Chapel	Flakstadvåg	1925
Torsken	Gryllefjord Chapel	Gryllefjord	1902
Torsken	Medby Chapel	Medby	1890
Tranøy	Stonglandet Church	Stonglandseidet	1896
Tranøy	Tranøy Church	Tranøya	1775
Tranøy	Skrolsvik Chapel	Skrollsvika	1924
Tranøy	Vangsvik Chapel	Vangsvik	1975

== Government ==
Senja Municipality is responsible for primary education (through 10th grade), outpatient health services, senior citizen services, welfare and other social services, zoning, economic development, and municipal roads and utilities. The municipality is governed by a municipal council of directly elected representatives. The mayor is indirectly elected by a vote of the municipal council. The municipality is under the jurisdiction of the Nord-Troms og Senja District Court and the Hålogaland Court of Appeal.

=== Municipal council ===
The municipal council (Kommunestyre) of Senja Municipality is made up of 45 representatives that are elected to four-year terms. The tables below show the current and historical composition of the council by political party.

Senja kommunestyre 2023–2027
Party name (in Norwegian)	Number of representatives
Labour Party (Arbeiderpartiet)	7
Progress Party (Fremskrittspartiet)	3
Conservative Party (Høyre)	7
Industry and Business Party (Industri‑ og Næringspartiet)	3
Christian Democratic Party (Kristelig Folkeparti)	1
Centre Party (Senterpartiet)	3
Socialist Left Party (Sosialistisk Venstreparti)	3
Senja List (Senjalista)	4
Total number of members:	31

Senja kommunestyre 2020–2023
Party name (in Norwegian)	Number of representatives
Labour Party (Arbeiderpartiet)	13
Progress Party (Fremskrittspartiet)	3
Green Party (Miljøpartiet De Grønne)	1
Conservative Party (Høyre)	8
Christian Democratic Party (Kristelig Folkeparti)	1
Centre Party (Senterpartiet)	11
Socialist Left Party (Sosialistisk Venstreparti)	2
Senja List (Senjalista)	6
Total number of members:	45
Note: This municipality was established on 1 January 2020 upon the merger of Berg Municipality, Lenvik Municipality, Torsken Municipality, and Tranøy Municipality.

=== Mayors ===
The mayor (Norwegian: ordfører) of Senja Municipality is the political leader of the municipality and the chairperson of the municipal council. Here is a list of people who have held this position:

- 2020–2023: Tom-Rune Eliseussen (Sp)
- 2023–present: Geir-Inge Sivertsen (H)

== Geography ==
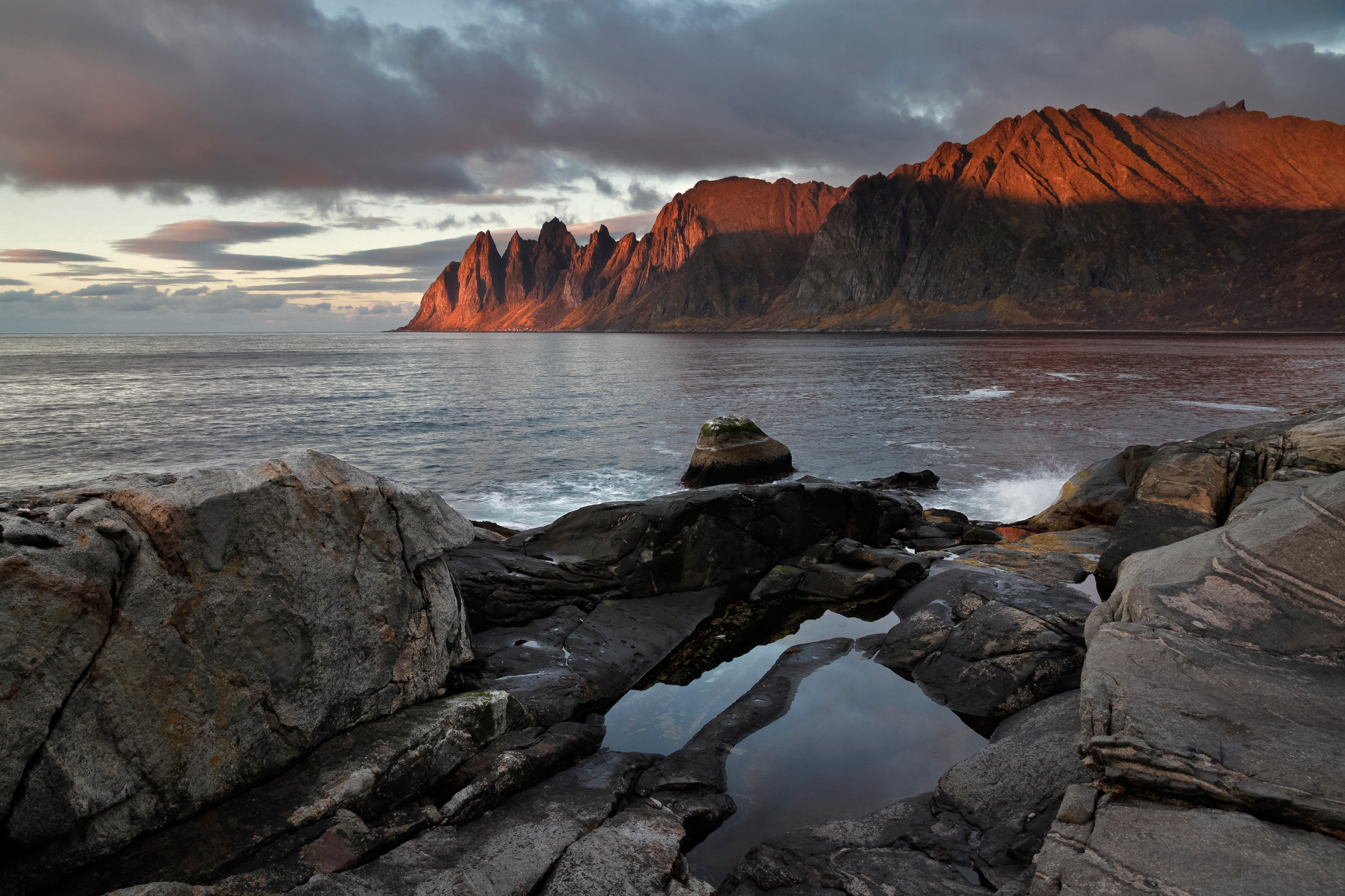
Oksneset and Ersfjorden from Tungeneset in low sunlight, Senja, 2012 October

Senja Municipality is located along the Troms county coast. The municipality encompasses the whole island of Senja, plus some smaller areas on the mainland around the Gisundet strait and the around the Rossfjordvatnet lake. The island is connected to the mainland by the Gisund Bridge. The northern coasts of the island of Senja faces the open sea, the western coast faces the islands of Andøya and Krøttøya, the southern coast faces the islands of Andørja and Dyrøya. On the western coast, steep and rugged mountains rise straight from the sea, with some fishing villages (like Gryllefjord, Husøy) tucked into the small lowland areas between the mountains and the sea. The eastern and southern parts of the island are milder, with rounder mountains, forests, rivers and agriculture land. The highest point in the municipality is the 1,202.4-metre (3,945 ft) tall mountain Vassbruntinden which lies on the border of Senja Municipality and Målselv Municipality.

The municipality is located to the southwest of Tromsø Municipality; west of Balsfjord Municipality; northwest of Målselv Municipality; north of Sørreisa Municipality, Dyrøy Municipality, and Ibestad Municipality; and east of Harstad Municipality and Andøy Municipality. All of these neighboring municipalities are separated from Senja by water except for a land border with Målselv Municipality and Sørreisa Municipality.

=== Climate ===
Laukhella is near Silsand on Senja island, facing the mainland towards the east. The eastern part of the island is less windy, with warmer summers and colder winters than the west coast. The climate data from Hekkingen Lighthouse is more typical for the west coast, albeit the precipitation is higher in the very west.

Climate data for Laukhella, Senja 1991–2020 (3 m, extremes 1997–2011)
Month	Jan	Feb	Mar	Apr	May	Jun	Jul	Aug	Sep	Oct	Nov	Dec	Year
Record high °C (°F)	8.3 (46.9)	8.3 (46.9)	11.2 (52.2)	16.2 (61.2)	25.7 (78.3)	26.7 (80.1)	28.3 (82.9)	27.6 (81.7)	22.2 (72.0)	16.2 (61.2)	12.6 (54.7)	9.7 (49.5)	28.3 (82.9)
Daily mean °C (°F)	−3.9 (25.0)	−3.8 (25.2)	−2 (28)	1.8 (35.2)	6.4 (43.5)	10.6 (51.1)	13.5 (56.3)	12.5 (54.5)	8.4 (47.1)	3.3 (37.9)	−0.3 (31.5)	−2.4 (27.7)	3.7 (38.6)
Record low °C (°F)	−22.3 (−8.1)	−23.7 (−10.7)	−22 (−8)	−17.7 (0.1)	−6 (21)	0.4 (32.7)	2.4 (36.3)	−1.3 (29.7)	−5.3 (22.5)	−14.7 (5.5)	−16.5 (2.3)	−21.8 (−7.2)	−23.7 (−10.7)
Average precipitation mm (inches)	102 (4.0)	85 (3.3)	97 (3.8)	63 (2.5)	51 (2.0)	57 (2.2)	66 (2.6)	77 (3.0)	117 (4.6)	114 (4.5)	88 (3.5)	105 (4.1)	1,120 (44.1)
Source: Norwegian Meteorological Institute

Climate data for Hekkingen Lighthouse 1991–2020 (33 m)
Month	Jan	Feb	Mar	Apr	May	Jun	Jul	Aug	Sep	Oct	Nov	Dec	Year
Mean daily maximum °C (°F)	1.2 (34.2)	0.8 (33.4)	1.8 (35.2)	4.5 (40.1)	8.6 (47.5)	11.5 (52.7)	14.4 (57.9)	14.1 (57.4)	11.2 (52.2)	6.7 (44.1)	4 (39)	2.4 (36.3)	6.8 (44.2)
Daily mean °C (°F)	−1 (30)	−1.4 (29.5)	−0.2 (31.6)	2.4 (36.3)	6 (43)	9 (48)	11.8 (53.2)	11.7 (53.1)	9.1 (48.4)	4.9 (40.8)	2.1 (35.8)	0.3 (32.5)	4.6 (40.2)
Mean daily minimum °C (°F)	−2.7 (27.1)	−3 (27)	−1.9 (28.6)	0.5 (32.9)	4 (39)	7.3 (45.1)	9.9 (49.8)	10 (50)	7.5 (45.5)	3.5 (38.3)	0.6 (33.1)	−1.3 (29.7)	2.9 (37.2)
Average precipitation mm (inches)	100 (3.9)	71 (2.8)	77 (3.0)	51 (2.0)	45 (1.8)	43 (1.7)	63 (2.5)	87 (3.4)	111 (4.4)	110 (4.3)	90 (3.5)	83 (3.3)	931 (36.6)
Source 1: Norwegian Meteorological Institute
Source 2: Meteostat Hekkingen

== Attractions ==
Among the sights of the island are Ånderdalen National Park with coastal pine forests and mountains, traditional fishing communities, and the Senja Troll, the world's largest troll. There are several small museums documenting local history, among these the Halibut Museum ("Kveitmuseet") in Skrolsvik.

== Notable people ==
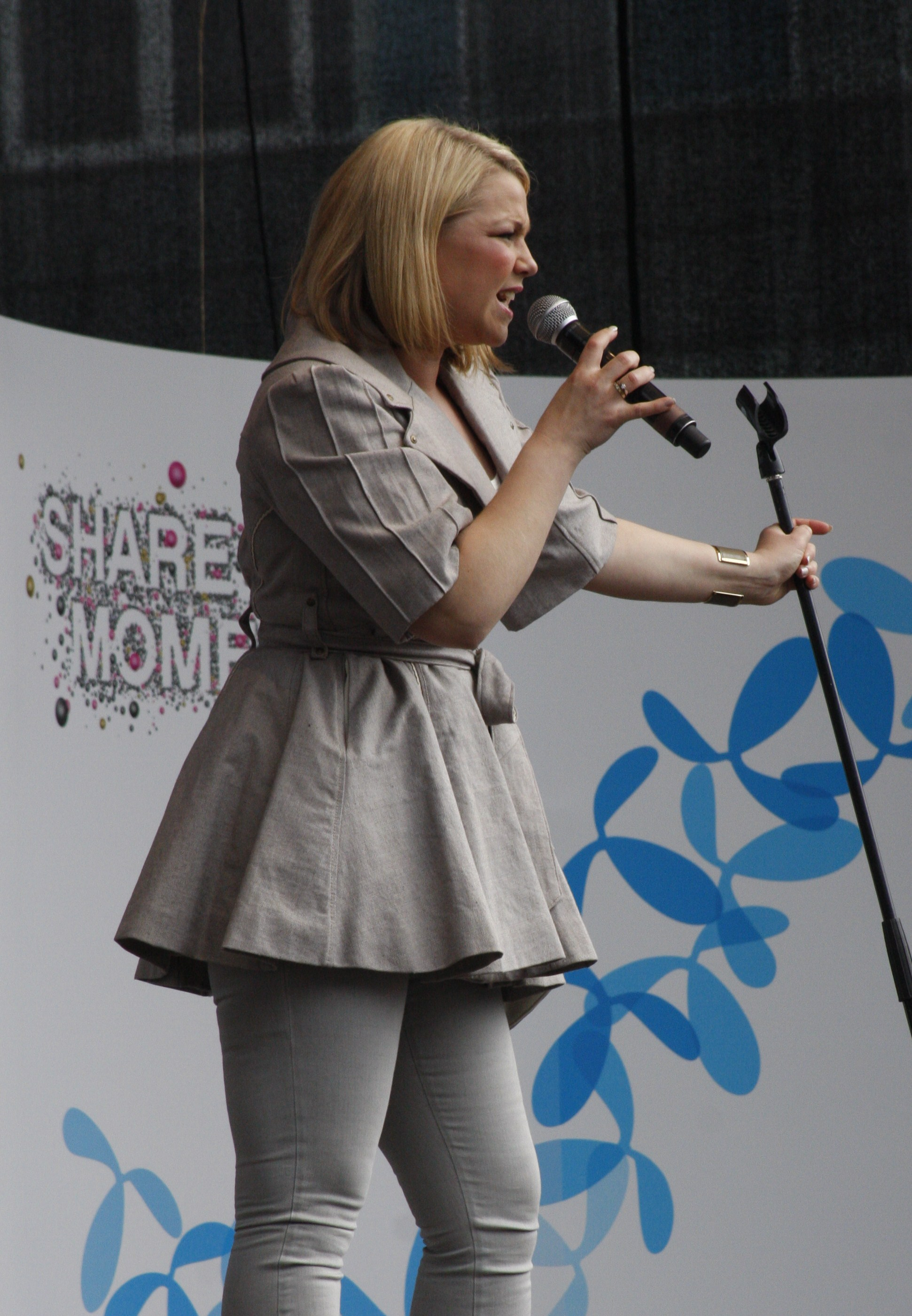
Maria Haukaas Storeng, 2010

- Anders Olsen (1718 on the island of Senja – 1786), a trader, explorer, and colonial administrator
- Bjarne Daniel Solli (1910 in Lenvik – 1989), a politician and Mayor of Lenvik from 1945 to 1953
- Arvid Nergård (1923 in Lenvik – 2006), the Bishop of Nord-Hålogaland in Tromsø from 1979 to 1990
- Per Kleiva (1931 in Torsken – 2017), a painter and graphic artist
- Ottar Brox (born 1932 in Torsken), a social scientist, academic, and politician
- Arvid Hanssen (1932–1998), a newspaper editor, poet, and novelist; his bust stands in Finnsnes
- Hans Kristian Eriksen (1933–2014), a non-fiction writer, magazine editor, novelist, short story writer, and teacher on the island of Senja from 1954 to 1978
- Geir-Inge Sivertsen (born 1965), an engineer, politician, and Mayor of Lenvik from 2011 to 2019
- Maria Haukaas Mittet (born 1979 in Finnsnes), a singer at the 2008 Eurovision Song Contest
- Andreas Amundsen (born 1980 on the island of Senja), a jazz bassist
- Pål Moddi Knutsen (born 1987 in Senja), stage name Moddi, a musician, author, and activist

=== Sport ===
- Harald Vassboten (1893 in Lenvik – 1973), a sport wrestler who competed at the 1920 Summer Olympics
- Christer Johnsgård (born 1987 in Silsand), a footballer with over 175 club caps
- Lars Gunnar Johnsen (born 1991 in Silsand), a footballer with over 200 club caps

== Media gallery ==
Photos of Senja

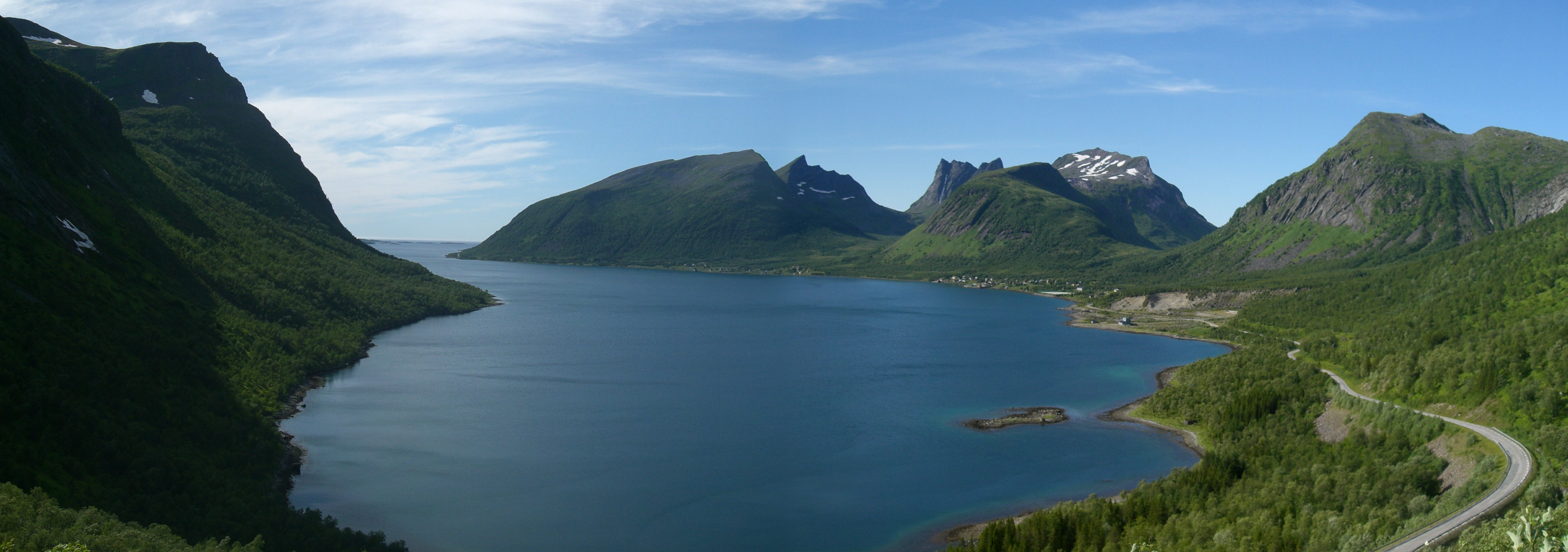
Bergsfjorden, Senja

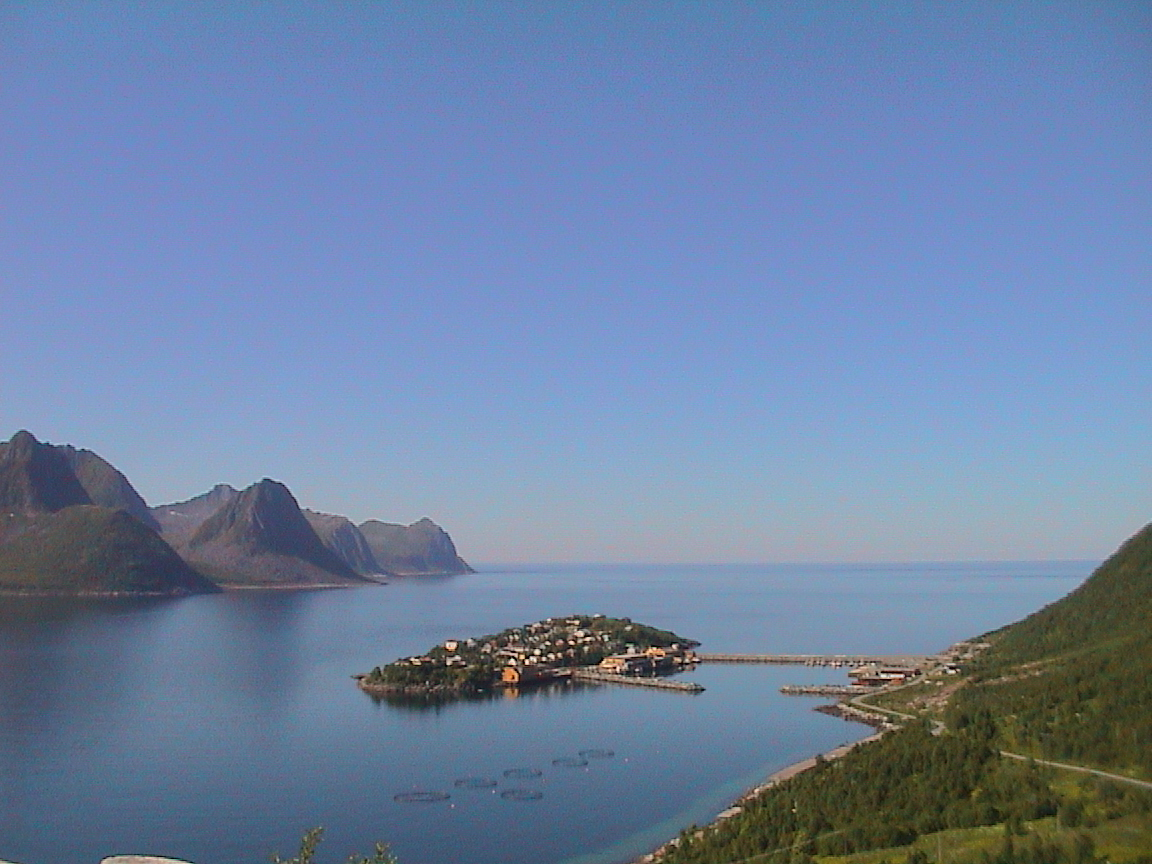
Husøy, Northern Senja

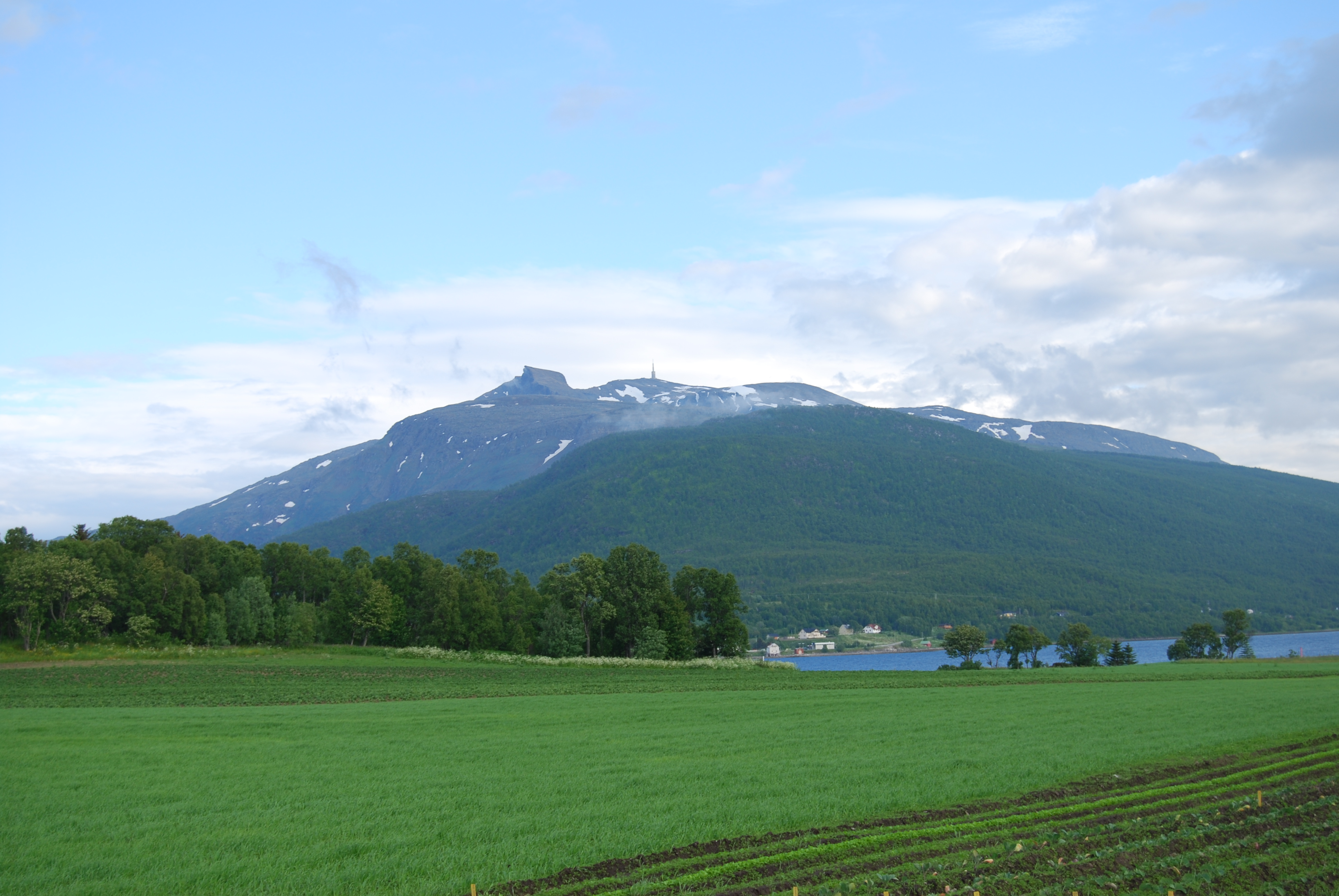
View from Gibostad towards Kistefjellet on the mainland

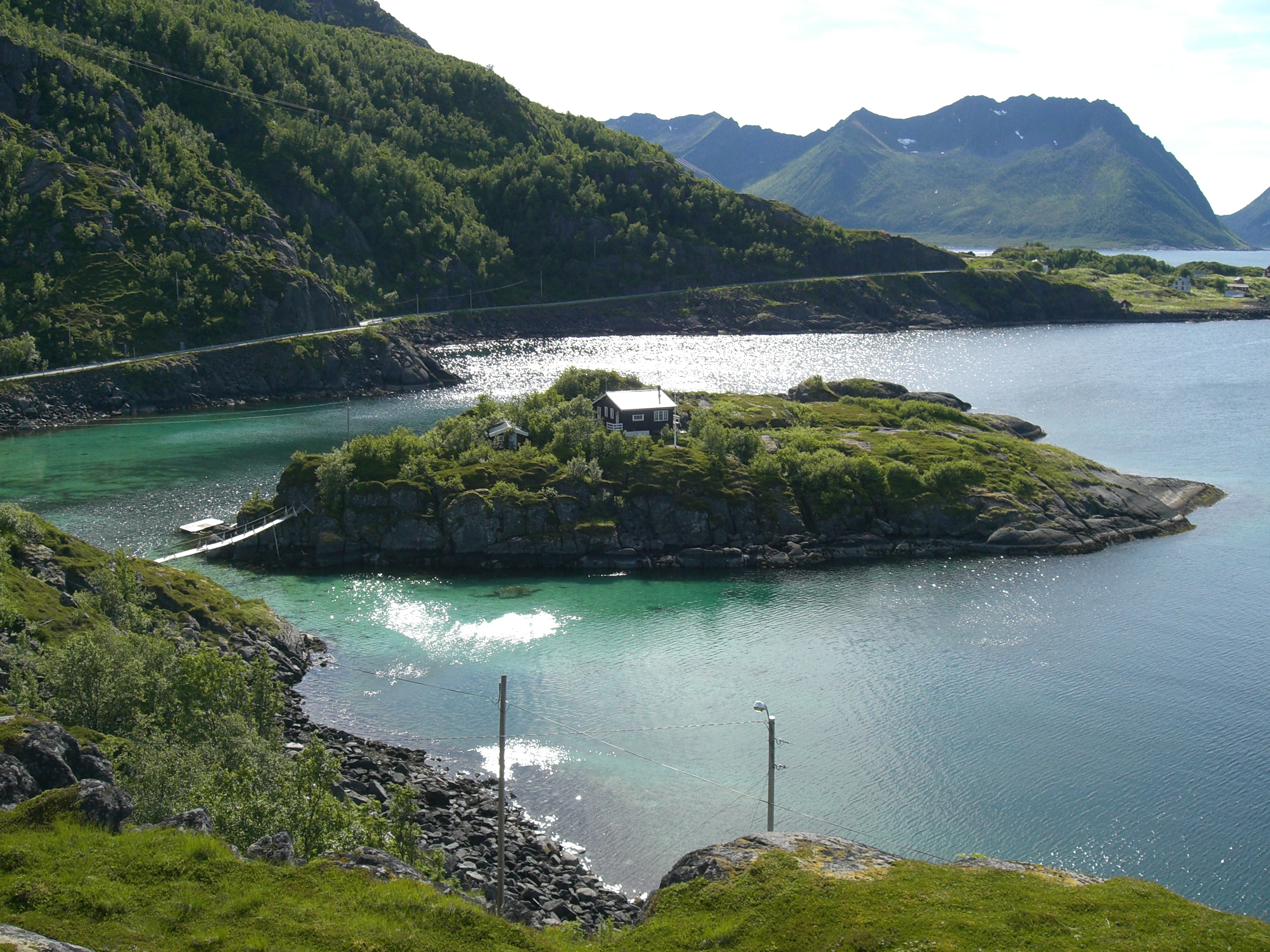
Seashore on the Senja island in Norway

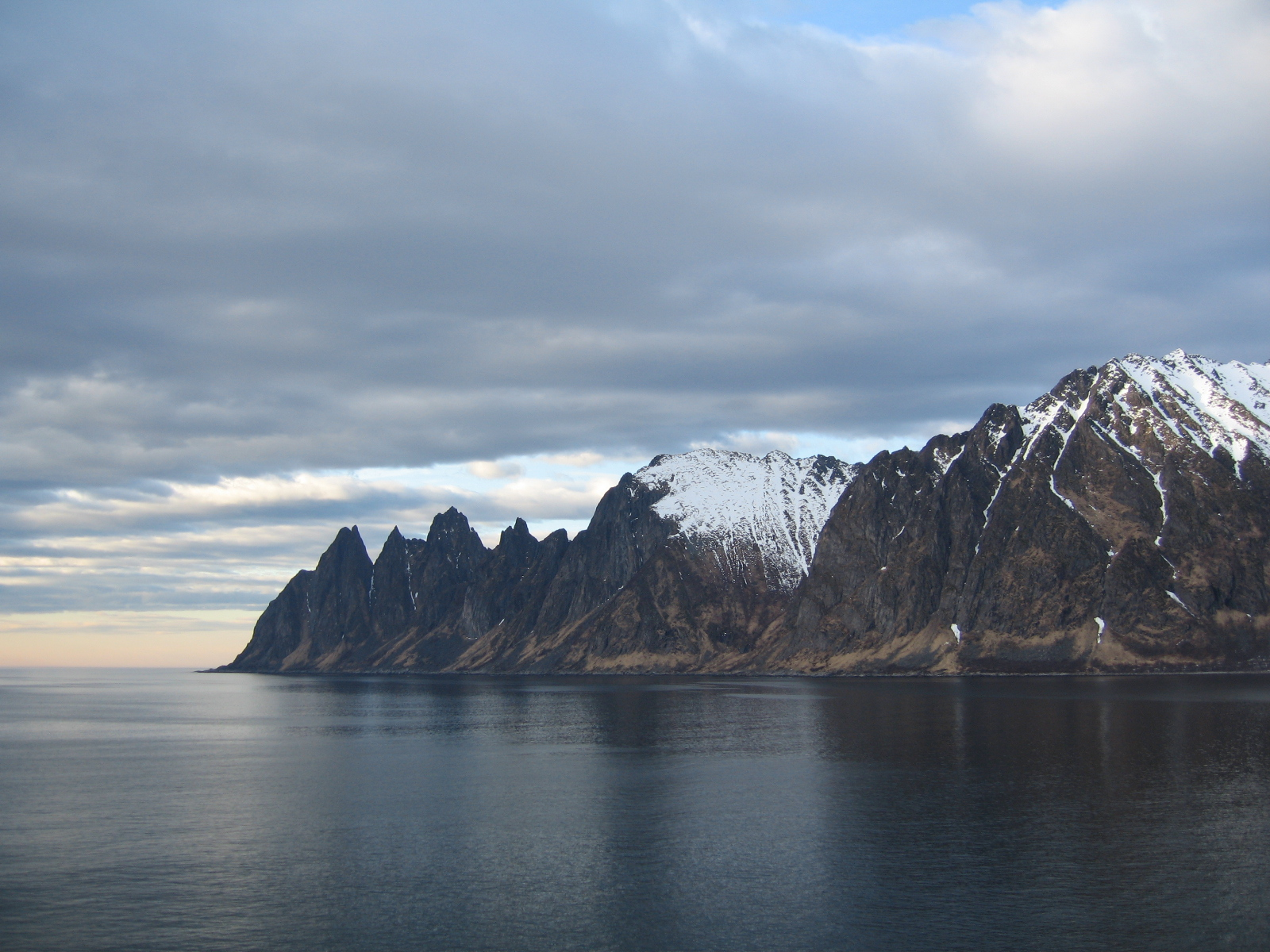
Ersfjorden and near mountains

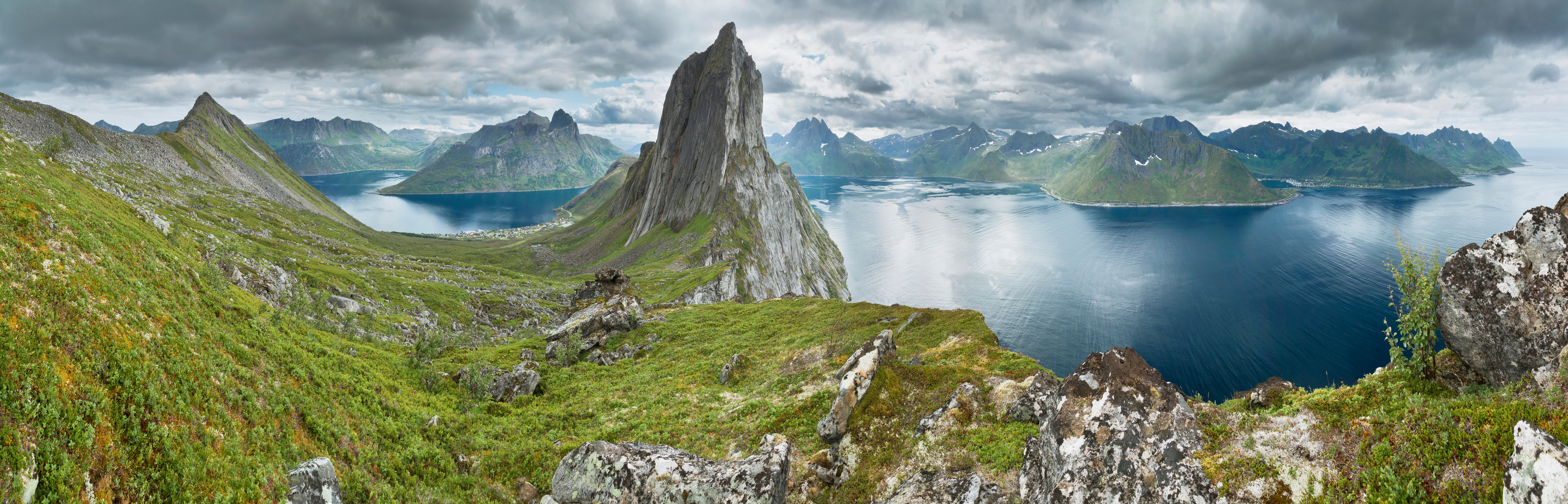
View from a ridge between Segla and Hesten, Senja, Norway

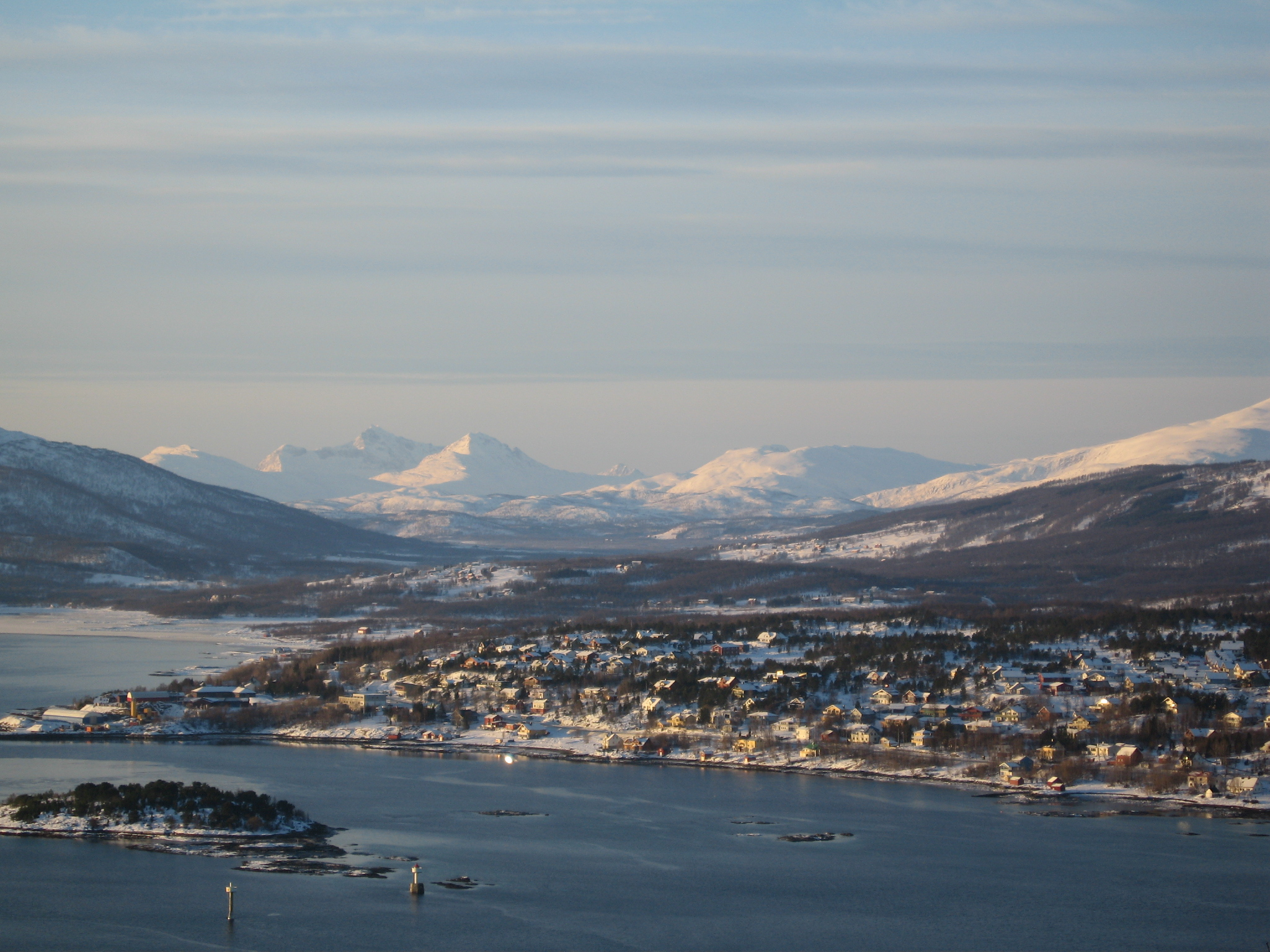
Silsand

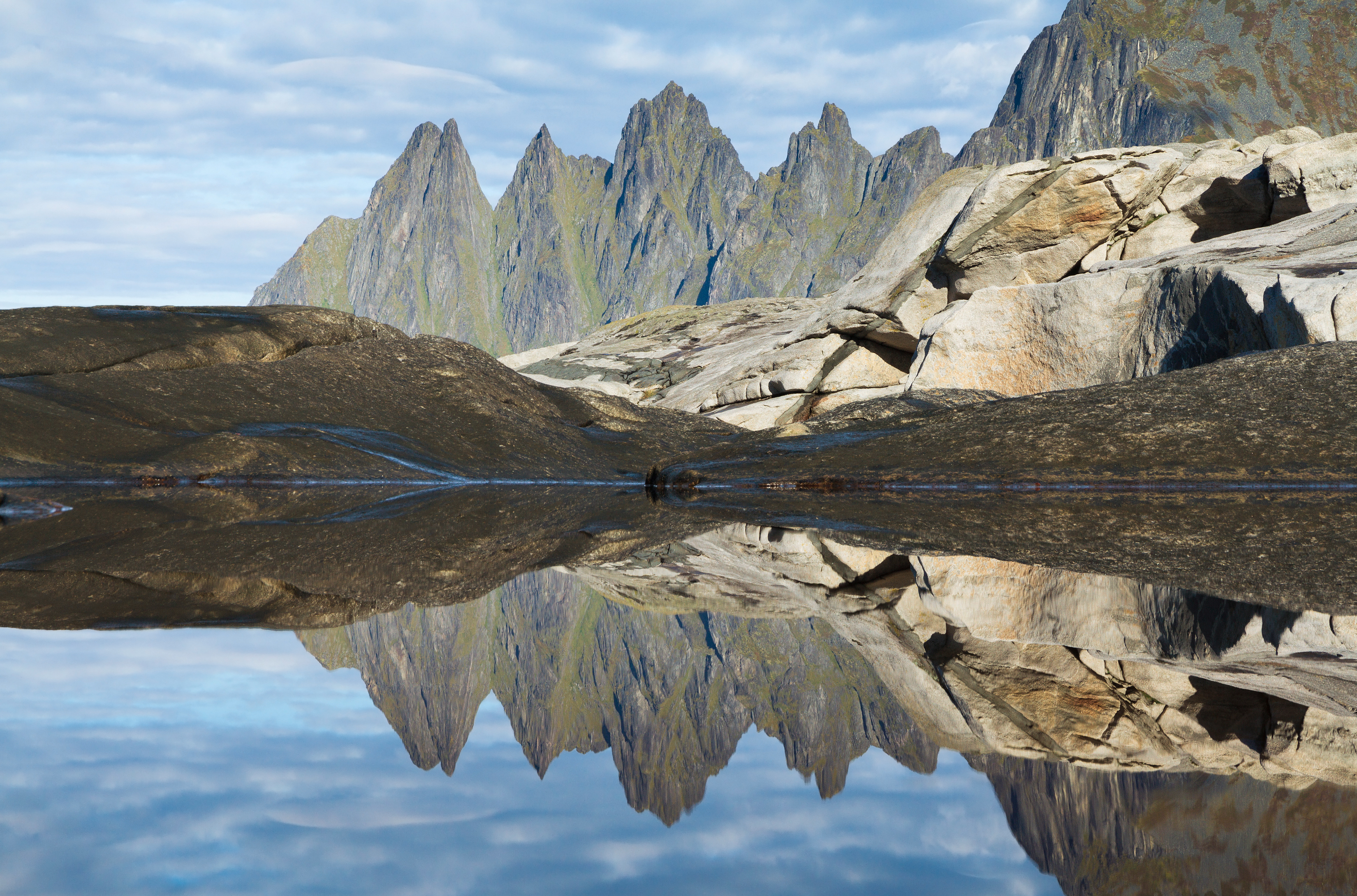
Okshornan peaks viewed from Tungeneset
