= Torsken (village) =

Village in Senja Municipality, Norway

Torsken (Norwegian); Doasku (Northern Sami)
- Village
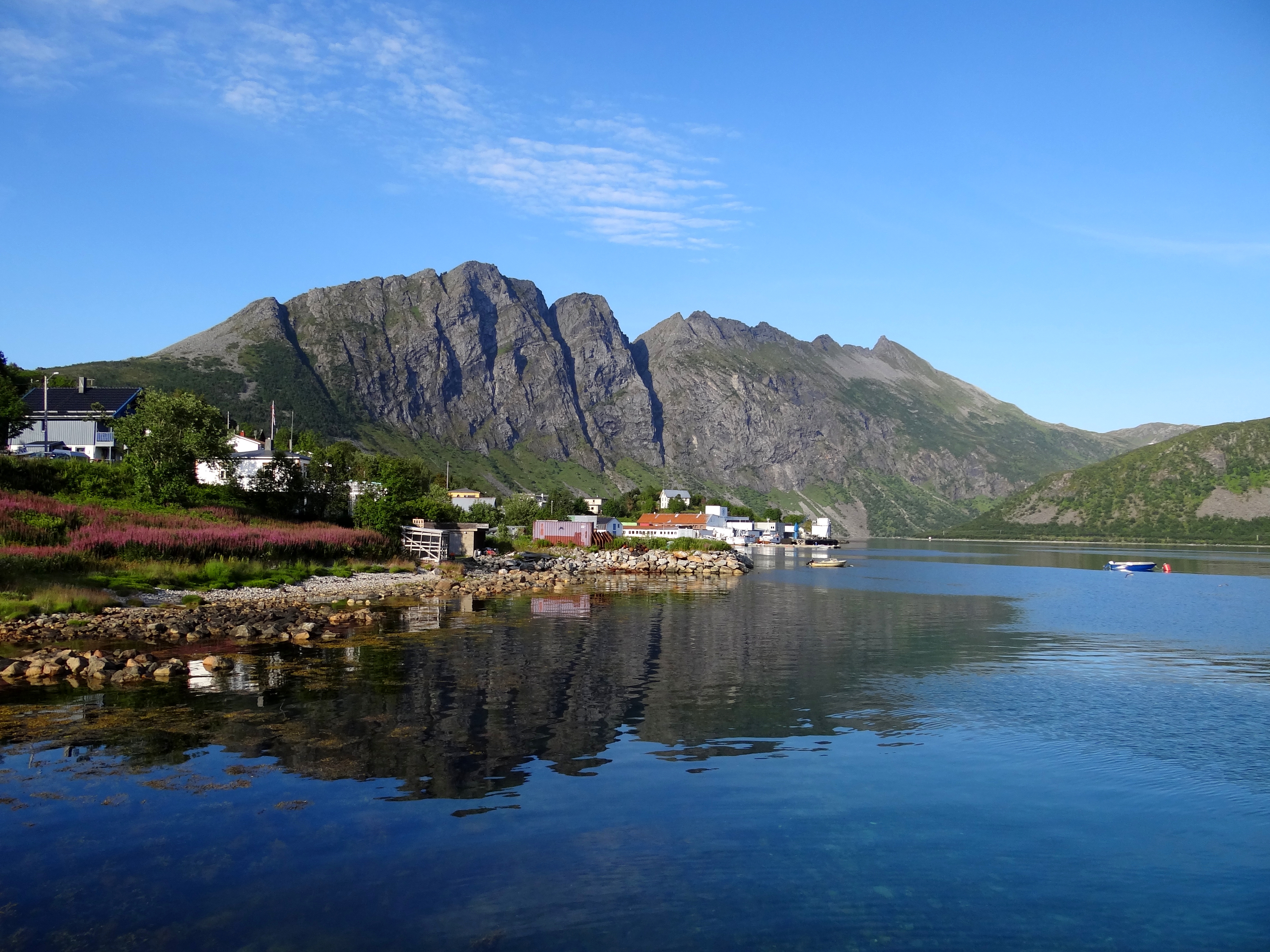
- View of the village
- Interactive map of: Torsken (Norwegian); Doasku (Northern Sami)
- Location within Troms Location within Norway
- Coordinates: 69°20′19″N 17°06′19″E
- Country: Norway
- Region: Northern Norway
- County: Troms
- District: Midt-Troms
- Municipality: Senja Municipality

Area
  - Total: 0.27 km^{2} (0.10 sq mi)
- Elevation: 14 m (46 ft)

Population (2019)
  - Total: 208
  - Density: 770/km^{2} (2,000/sq mi)
- Time zone: UTC+01:00 (CET)
  - Summer (DST): UTC+02:00 (CEST)
- Post Code: 9381 Torsken

Torsken (Norwegian) or Doasku (Northern Sami) is a village in Senja Municipality in Troms county, Norway. It is located along the Torskenfjorden on the southwestern part of the island of Senja. The Skipsfjorden branches off the main fjord just east of the village. The historic Torsken Church is located in this village. There is one road into the village, from the nearby village of Gryllefjord.

The 0.27-square-kilometre (67-acre) village had a population (2019) of 208 and a population density of 770 inhabitants per square kilometre (2,000/sq mi). Since 2019, the population and area data for this village area has not been separately tracked by Statistics Norway.
