= Torsken Church =

- Torsken kirke
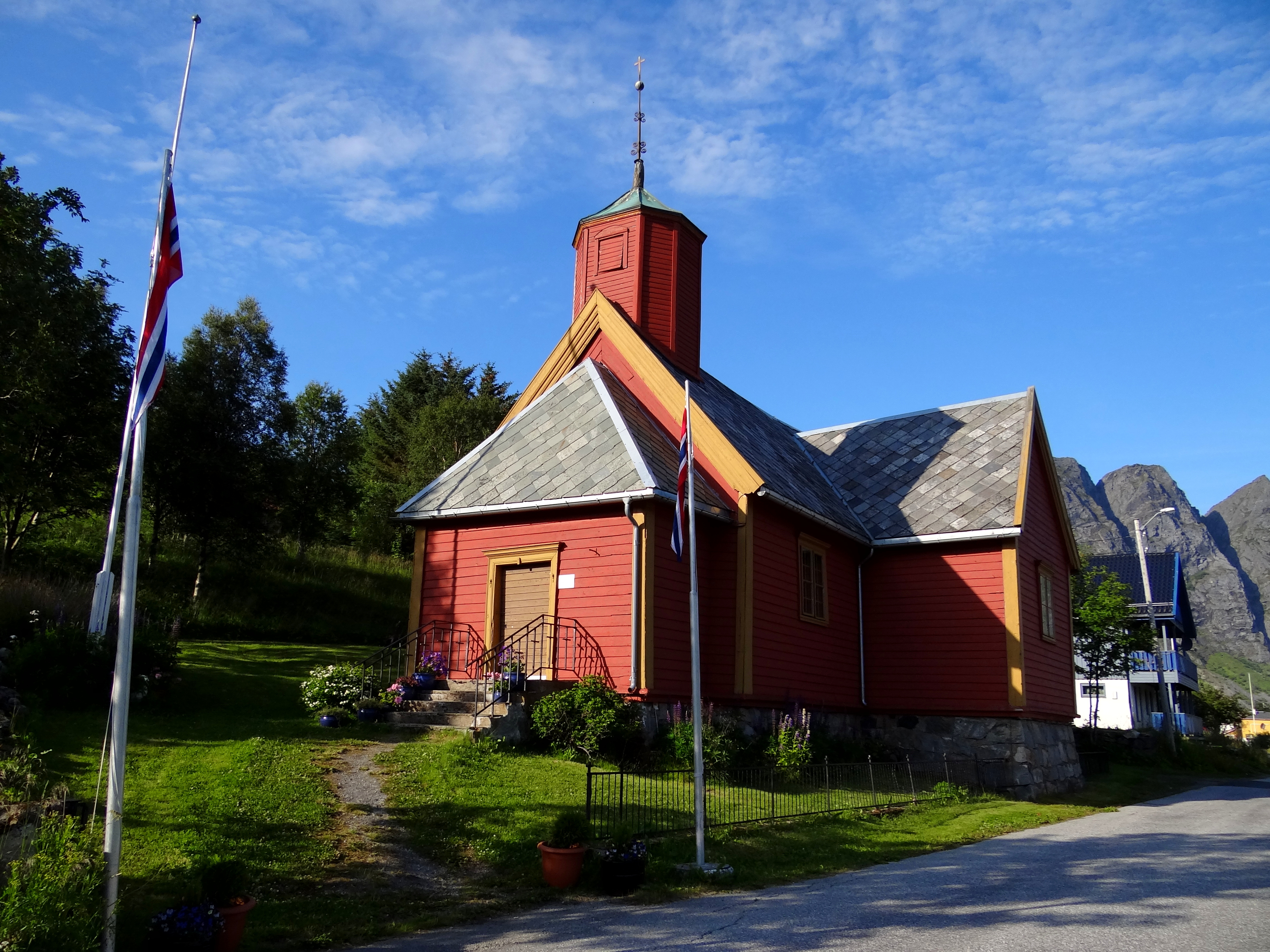
- View of the church
- Torsken Church
- 69.3373°N 17.0975°E
- Location: Senja Municipality, Troms
- Country: Norway
- Denomination: Church of Norway
- Churchmanship: Evangelical Lutheran

History
- Status: Parish church
- Founded: 15th century
- Consecrated: 1784

Architecture
- Functional status: Active
- Architectural type: Cruciform
- Completed: 1784 (242 years ago)

Specifications
- Capacity: 100
- Materials: Wood

Administration
- Diocese: Nord-Hålogaland
- Deanery: Senja prosti
- Parish: Torsken
- Norwegian Cultural Heritage Site
- Type: Church
- Status: Automatically protected
- ID: 85651

Torsken Church (Norwegian: Torsken kirke) is a parish church of the Church of Norway in Senja Municipality in Troms county, Norway. It is located in the village of Torsken on the west coast of the island of Senja. It is the main church for the Torsken parish which is part of the Senja prosti (deanery) in the Diocese of Nord-Hålogaland. The red, wooden church was built in a cruciform style in 1784 by an unknown architect. The church seats about 100 people.

== History ==
The earliest existing historical records of the church date back to the year 1589, but the church was likely founded around the year 1400. The first church was likely located several meters to the north of the present church site. It is not known how many buildings existed on the site, but there have been at least two buildings here. In 1770, the church was described in historical records as a small timber-framed building with a cruciform ground plan and a sod roof. It had an entry porch and a small tower on the roof, but no sacristy. In 1784, the old church was torn down and a new building was constructed slightly south of the old building. The new church was built with materials salvaged from when they took the old church down. In 1866, the interior and exterior of the church was renovated with new paint and furniture. In 1967, many of these changes were reversed to bring back the historic look of the building.

== See also ==
- List of churches in Nord-Hålogaland
