= Lenvik Municipality =

Former municipality in Troms, Norway

Lenvik Municipality Lenvik kommune Leaŋgáviika suohkan (Northern Sami)
- Former municipality
- Lenviken herred (historic name)
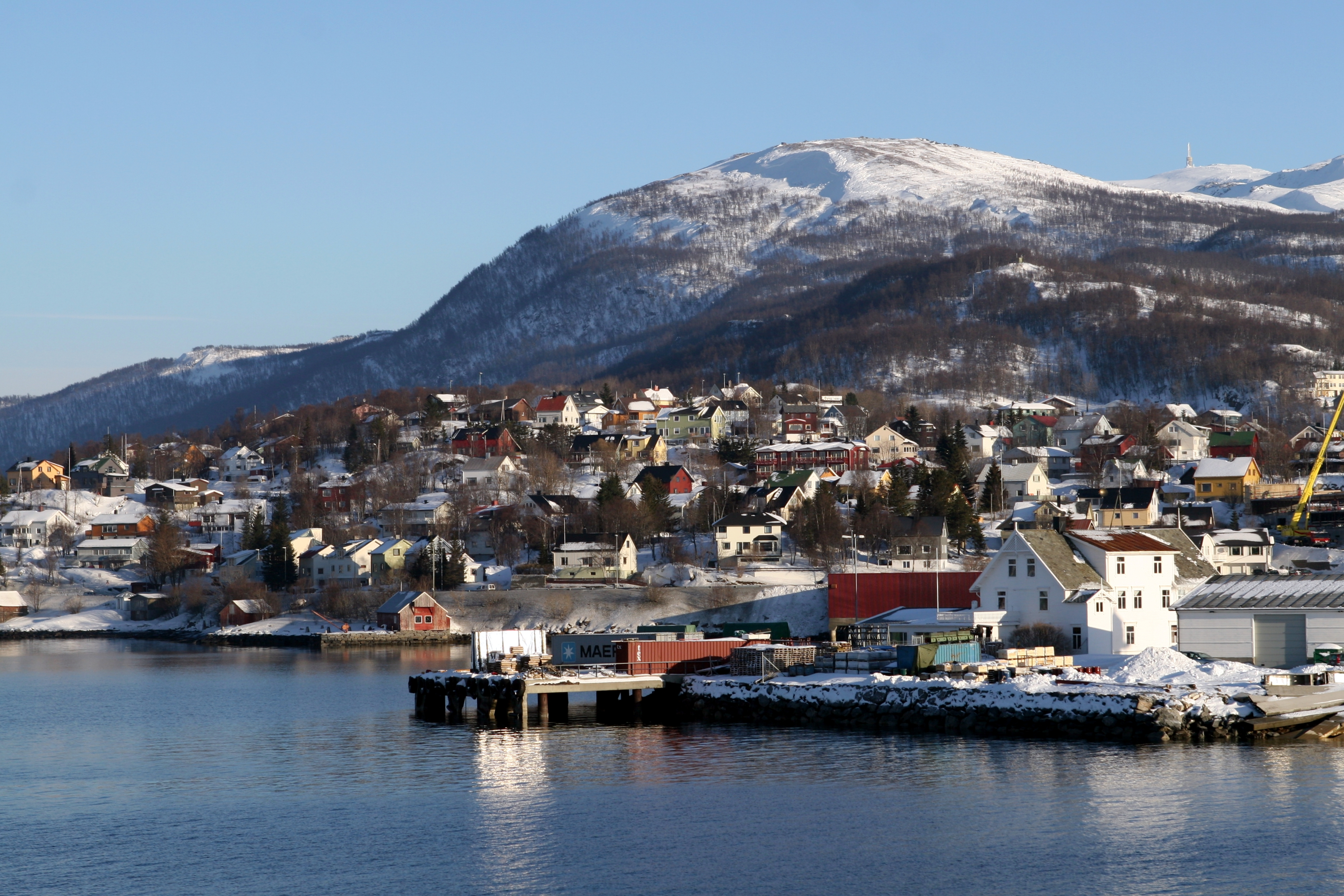
- View of Finnsnes

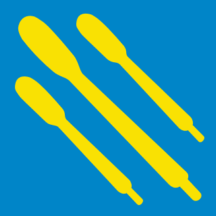
- Flag Coat of arms

- Troms within Norway

- Lenvik within Troms
- Coordinates: 69°23′01″N 17°58′03″E
- Country: Norway
- County: Troms
- District: Midt-Troms
- Established: 1 Jan 1838
  - Created as: Formannskapsdistrikt
- Disestablished: 1 Jan 2020
  - Succeeded by: Senja Municipality
- Administrative centre: Finnsnes

Government
  - Mayor (2011–2019): Geir-Inge Sivertsen (H)

Area (upon dissolution)
  - Total: 892.58 km^{2} (344.63 sq mi)
  - Land: 848.77 km^{2} (327.71 sq mi)
  - Water: 43.81 km^{2} (16.92 sq mi) 4.9%
  - Rank: #126 in Norway
- Highest elevation: 1,202.8 m (3,946 ft)

Population (2019)
  - Total: 11,679
  - Rank: #101 in Norway
  - Density: 13.1/km^{2} (34/sq mi)
  - Change (10 years): ▲ +4.2%
- Demonym: Lenvikværing

Official language
  - Norwegian form: Neutral
- Time zone: UTC+01:00 (CET)
  - Summer (DST): UTC+02:00 (CEST)
- ISO 3166 code: NO-1931

Lenvik (Northern Sami: Leaŋgáviika) is a former municipality in Troms county, Norway. The municipality existed from 1838 until its dissolution in 2020. The municipality was partly situated on the mainland and partly on the island of Senja in what is now Senja Municipality. The administrative centre was the town of Finnsnes, where the Gisund Bridge connects Senja to the mainland on Norwegian County Road 86. Other villages in the municipality included Aglapsvik, Gibostad, Botnhamn, Fjordgård, Finnfjordbotn, Husøy, Langnes, Laukhella, Silsand, and Rossfjordstraumen.

Prior to its dissolution in 2020, the 893-square-kilometre (345 sq mi) municipality was the 126th largest by area out of the 422 municipalities in Norway. Lenvik Municipality was also the 101st most populous municipality in Norway with a population of 11,679. The municipality's population density was 13.1 inhabitants per square kilometre (34/sq mi) and its population has increased by 4.2% over the previous decade.

== General information ==
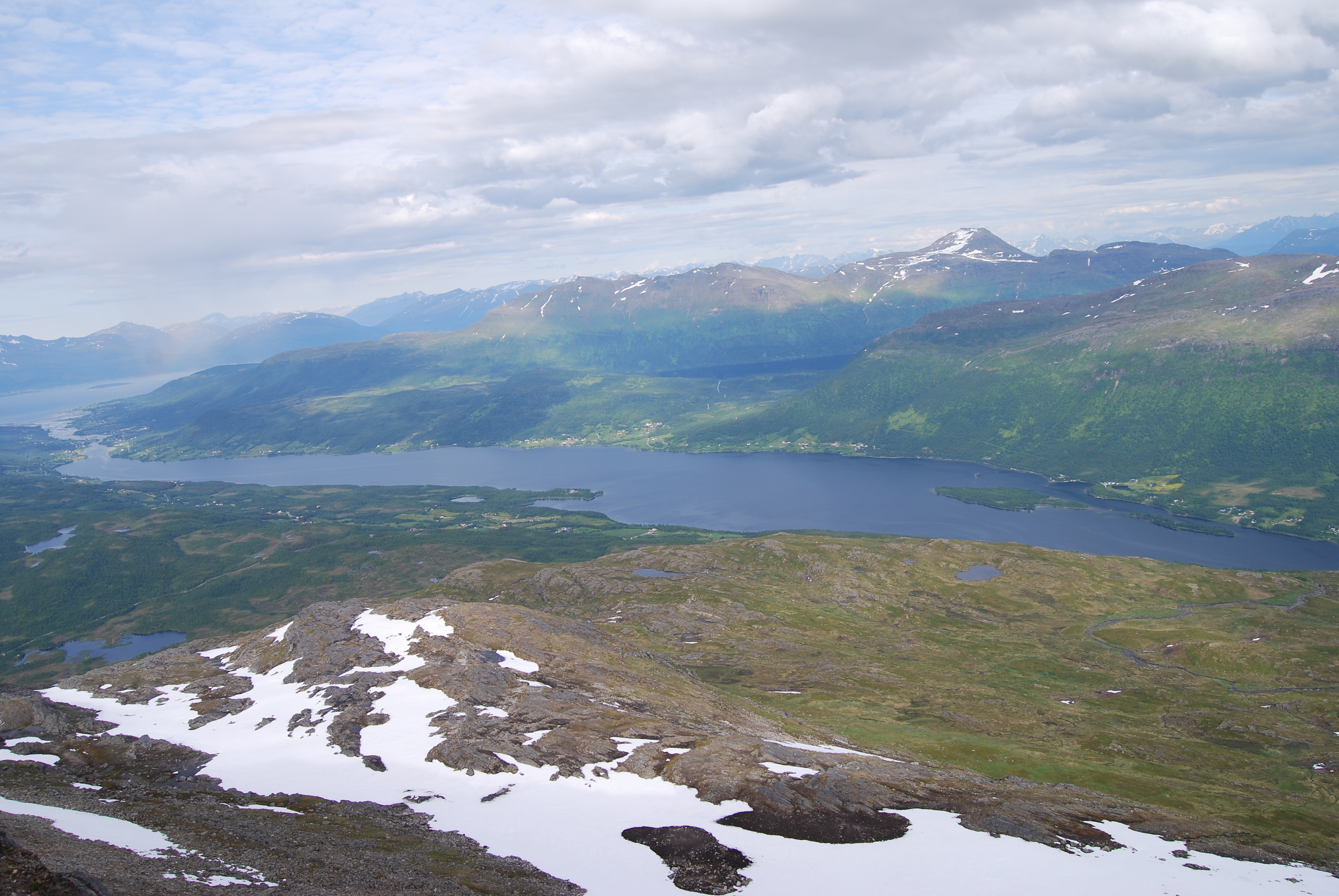
View of the lake Rossfjordstraumen

The parish of Lenvik was established as a municipality on 1 January 1838 (see formannskapsdistrikt law). In 1848, most of the mainland parts of Lenvik (population: 2,616) were separated to form the new Målselv Municipality, leaving Lenvik with 3,029 residents. Then in 1855, the northern part of Lenvik (population: 811) was separated to form the new Hillesøy Municipality. This left Lenvik with 2,757 inhabitants. On 1 January 1871, a small part of Lenvik (population: 70) was transferred to the neighboring Malangen Municipality.

During the 1960s, there were many municipal mergers across Norway due to the work of the Schei Committee. On 1 January 1964, the following areas were merged into Lenvik:

- the part of Sørreisa Municipality on the island of Senja (population: 129)
- the Hellemo, Paulsrud, Johnsgård, and Stormo farms in Tranøy Municipality (population: 106)
- the part of Hillesøy Municipality on the island of Senja and the whole island of Hekkingen (population: 1,159)

These areas joined to old areas of Lenvik to form a new, larger Lenvik Municipality with a total population of 10,219.

In March 2017, the Parliament of Norway voted to merge Berg Municipality, Torsken Municipality, Lenvik Municipality, and Tranøy Municipality. The new municipality would encompass the whole island of Senja plus part of the mainland located between the Gisundet strait and the Malangen fjord. On 1 January 2020, Lenvik Municipality ceased to exist when it became part of the new Senja Municipality.

=== Name ===
The municipality (originally the parish) is named after the old Lenvik farm (Old Norse: Lengjuvík) since the first Lenvik Church was built there. The first element is the genitive case of the river name Lengja. The river name is derived from the word langr which means "long". The last element is vík which means "cove" or "bay". Historically, the name of the municipality was spelled Lenviken. On 6 January 1908, a royal resolution changed the spelling of the name of the municipality to Lenvik, removing the definite form ending -en.

=== Coat of arms ===
The coat of arms was granted on 22 August 1986 and it was in used until 1 January 2020 when the municipality became part of the new Senja Municipality. The official blazon is "Azure, three oars bendwise Or, blades to the chief" (Norwegian: I blått tre skråstilte gull årer med bladene opp). This means the arms have a blue field (background) and the charge is three oars laying diagonally with the blades at the top of the shield. The oars have a tincture of Or which means they are commonly colored yellow, but if it is made out of metal, then gold is used. The blue color in the field and the oars were chosen as a symbol for sailing and shipping along with the fishing industry which is the main form of income in the municipality. The arms were designed by Arvid Sveen.

=== Churches ===
The Church of Norway had one parish (sokn) within Lenvik Municipality. It was part of the Senja prosti (deanery) in the Diocese of Nord-Hålogaland.

Churches in Lenvik Municipality
Parish (sokn)	Church name	Location of the church	Year built
Lenvik	Finnsnes Church	Finnsnes	1979
Lenvik	Lenvik Church	Bjorelvnes	1879
Lenvik	Rossfjord Church	Rossfjordstraumen	1822
Lenvik	Fjordgård Chapel	Fjordgård	1976
Lenvik	Gibostad Chapel	Gibostad	1939
Lenvik	Husøy Chapel	Husøy i Senja	1957
Lenvik	Lysbotn Chapel	Lysnes	1970
Lenvik	Sandbakken Chapel	Sandbakken	1974

== History ==
The first local church was built around the year 1150 at Bjorelvnes, and for a century, this was the northernmost church in the world. Important villages in the past include Klauva and Gibostad. Gibostad was the administrative centre until the 1960s, when the administration was moved to Finnsnes. In 2000, Finnsnes was declared a town.

== Geography ==
Lenvik Municipality was partly located on the island of Senja and also on the mainland of Norway. The Malangen fjord flowed along the northern boundary and the Solbergfjorden was located along the southern boundary. The Gisundet strait ran north–south through the center of the municipality with only one road crossing, the Gisund Bridge. The neighboring Berg Municipality and Tranøy Municipality bordered the municipality to the west, Tromsø Municipality was to the north (across the Malangen fjord), Balsfjord Municipality and Målselv Municipality were to the east, and Sørreisa Municipality and Dyrøy Municipality were to the south (across the Solbergfjorden). The highest point in the municipality was the 1,202.8-metre (3,946 ft) tall mountain Vassbruntinden. The lake Lysvatnet was located in the municipality on Senja island, west of Gibostad.

=== Climate ===
Climate data for Gibostad, Lenvik
Month	Jan	Feb	Mar	Apr	May	Jun	Jul	Aug	Sep	Oct	Nov	Dec	Year
Mean daily maximum °C (°F)	−1.9 (28.6)	−1.8 (28.8)	0.2 (32.4)	3.6 (38.5)	8.4 (47.1)	12.9 (55.2)	15.0 (59.0)	14.6 (58.3)	10.5 (50.9)	5.8 (42.4)	1.5 (34.7)	−0.7 (30.7)	5.7 (42.3)
Daily mean °C (°F)	−4.4 (24.1)	−4.2 (24.4)	−2.3 (27.9)	1.0 (33.8)	5.5 (41.9)	9.7 (49.5)	12.3 (54.1)	11.6 (52.9)	7.5 (45.5)	3.3 (37.9)	−0.8 (30.6)	−3.2 (26.2)	3.0 (37.4)
Mean daily minimum °C (°F)	−7.1 (19.2)	−7.0 (19.4)	−5.5 (22.1)	−2.1 (28.2)	2.5 (36.5)	6.8 (44.2)	9.1 (48.4)	8.3 (46.9)	5.1 (41.2)	1.3 (34.3)	−3.1 (26.4)	−5.8 (21.6)	0.2 (32.4)
Average precipitation mm (inches)	85 (3.3)	80 (3.1)	60 (2.4)	54 (2.1)	39 (1.5)	47 (1.9)	62 (2.4)	71 (2.8)	91 (3.6)	119 (4.7)	94 (3.7)	98 (3.9)	900 (35.4)
Average precipitation days (≥ 1 mm)	13.4	12.4	11.5	10.7	9.2	10.6	13.2	12.4	14.3	16.0	14.7	15.6	154.0
Source: Norwegian Meteorological Institute

== Government ==
While it existed, Lenvik Municipality was responsible for primary education (through 10th grade), outpatient health services, senior citizen services, welfare and other social services, zoning, economic development, and municipal roads and utilities. The municipality was governed by a municipal council of directly elected representatives. The mayor was indirectly elected by a vote of the municipal council. The municipality was under the jurisdiction of the Senja District Court and the Hålogaland Court of Appeal.

=== Municipal council ===
The municipal council (Kommunestyre) of Lenvik Municipality was made up of 31 representatives that were elected to four year terms. The tables below show the historical composition of the council by political party.

Lenvik kommunestyre 2015–2019
Party name (in Norwegian)	Number of representatives
Labour Party (Arbeiderpartiet)	8
Progress Party (Fremskrittspartiet)	4
Conservative Party (Høyre)	7
Christian Democratic Party (Kristelig Folkeparti)	2
Centre Party (Senterpartiet)	3
Socialist Left Party (Sosialistisk Venstreparti)	2
Liberal Party (Venstre)	1
Lenvik List (Lenviklista)	4
Total number of members:	31
Note: On 1 January 2020, Lenvik Municipality became part of Senja Municipality.

Lenvik kommunestyre 2011–2015
Party name (in Norwegian)	Number of representatives
Labour Party (Arbeiderpartiet)	7
Progress Party (Fremskrittspartiet)	6
Conservative Party (Høyre)	8
Christian Democratic Party (Kristelig Folkeparti)	1
Centre Party (Senterpartiet)	3
Socialist Left Party (Sosialistisk Venstreparti)	1
Liberal Party (Venstre)	1
Lenvik List (Lenviklista)	4
Total number of members:	31

Lenvik kommunestyre 2007–2011
Party name (in Norwegian)	Number of representatives
Labour Party (Arbeiderpartiet)	9
Progress Party (Fremskrittspartiet)	9
Conservative Party (Høyre)	4
Christian Democratic Party (Kristelig Folkeparti)	2
Coastal Party (Kystpartiet)	1
Centre Party (Senterpartiet)	3
Socialist Left Party (Sosialistisk Venstreparti)	2
Liberal Party (Venstre)	1
Total number of members:	31

Lenvik kommunestyre 2003–2007
Party name (in Norwegian)	Number of representatives
Labour Party (Arbeiderpartiet)	8
Progress Party (Fremskrittspartiet)	8
Conservative Party (Høyre)	3
Christian Democratic Party (Kristelig Folkeparti)	3
Coastal Party (Kystpartiet)	2
Centre Party (Senterpartiet)	2
Socialist Left Party (Sosialistisk Venstreparti)	4
Liberal Party (Venstre)	1
Total number of members:	31

Lenvik kommunestyre 1999–2003
Party name (in Norwegian)	Number of representatives
Labour Party (Arbeiderpartiet)	12
Progress Party (Fremskrittspartiet)	4
Conservative Party (Høyre)	8
Christian Democratic Party (Kristelig Folkeparti)	6
Centre Party (Senterpartiet)	3
Socialist Left Party (Sosialistisk Venstreparti)	3
Common List (Felleslista)	1
Total number of members:	37

Lenvik kommunestyre 1995–1999
Party name (in Norwegian)	Number of representatives
Labour Party (Arbeiderpartiet)	12
Progress Party (Fremskrittspartiet)	1
Conservative Party (Høyre)	8
Christian Democratic Party (Kristelig Folkeparti)	5
Centre Party (Senterpartiet)	7
Socialist Left Party (Sosialistisk Venstreparti)	3
Liberal Party (Venstre)	1
Total number of members:	37

Lenvik kommunestyre 1991–1995
Party name (in Norwegian)	Number of representatives
Labour Party (Arbeiderpartiet)	13
Progress Party (Fremskrittspartiet)	1
Conservative Party (Høyre)	8
Christian Democratic Party (Kristelig Folkeparti)	3
Centre Party (Senterpartiet)	5
Socialist Left Party (Sosialistisk Venstreparti)	6
Southern Gisund non-party list (Søndre Gisund upolitiske liste)	1
Total number of members:	37

Lenvik kommunestyre 1987–1991
Party name (in Norwegian)	Number of representatives
Labour Party (Arbeiderpartiet)	21
Conservative Party (Høyre)	8
Christian Democratic Party (Kristelig Folkeparti)	4
Centre Party (Senterpartiet)	2
Socialist Left Party (Sosialistisk Venstreparti)	2
Liberal Party (Venstre)	1
Southern Gisund non-party list (Søndre Gisund upolitiske liste)	7
Total number of members:	45

Lenvik kommunestyre 1983–1987
Party name (in Norwegian)	Number of representatives
Labour Party (Arbeiderpartiet)	24
Conservative Party (Høyre)	9
Christian Democratic Party (Kristelig Folkeparti)	4
Centre Party (Senterpartiet)	2
Socialist Left Party (Sosialistisk Venstreparti)	2
Liberal Party (Venstre)	2
Southern Gisund non-party list (Søndre Gisund upolitiske liste)	2
Total number of members:	45

Lenvik kommunestyre 1979–1983
Party name (in Norwegian)	Number of representatives
Labour Party (Arbeiderpartiet)	18
Conservative Party (Høyre)	9
Christian Democratic Party (Kristelig Folkeparti)	5
Centre Party (Senterpartiet)	3
Socialist Left Party (Sosialistisk Venstreparti)	2
Liberal Party (Venstre)	2
Joint list of the Communist Party and Independent Socialists (Norges Kommunistiske Parti og uavhengige sosialister)	1
Southern Gisund non-party list (Søndre Gisund upolitiske liste)	4
Rossfjordbygda List (Rossfjordbygdas liste)	1
Total number of members:	45

Lenvik kommunestyre 1975–1979
Party name (in Norwegian)	Number of representatives
Labour Party (Arbeiderpartiet)	19
Conservative Party (Høyre)	4
Christian Democratic Party (Kristelig Folkeparti)	6
Centre Party (Senterpartiet)	6
Socialist Left Party (Sosialistisk Venstreparti)	2
Liberal Party (Venstre)	1
Rossfjordstraumen local list (Rossfjordstraumen Bygdeliste)	1
Southern Gisund non-party list (Søndre Gisund Upolitiske Liste)	5
Trollvik-Leiknes local list (Trollvik-Leiknes Bygdeliste)	1
Total number of members:	45

Lenvik kommunestyre 1971–1975
Party name (in Norwegian)	Number of representatives
Labour Party (Arbeiderpartiet)	20
Christian Democratic Party (Kristelig Folkeparti)	4
Centre Party (Senterpartiet)	3
Socialist People's Party (Sosialistisk Folkeparti)	2
Liberal Party (Venstre)	2
Local List(s) (Lokale lister)	13
Socialist common list (Venstresosialistiske felleslister)	1
Total number of members:	45

Lenvik kommunestyre 1967–1971
Party name (in Norwegian)	Number of representatives
Labour Party (Arbeiderpartiet)	24
Conservative Party (Høyre)	3
Christian Democratic Party (Kristelig Folkeparti)	3
Centre Party (Senterpartiet)	2
Socialist People's Party (Sosialistisk Folkeparti)	2
Liberal Party (Venstre)	4
Local List(s) (Lokale lister)	7
Total number of members:	45

Lenvik kommunestyre 1963–1967
Party name (in Norwegian)	Number of representatives
Labour Party (Arbeiderpartiet)	17
Conservative Party (Høyre)	3
Communist Party (Kommunistiske Parti)	1
Christian Democratic Party (Kristelig Folkeparti)	3
Liberal Party (Venstre)	2
Local List(s) (Lokale lister)	19
Total number of members:	45

Lenvik herredsstyre 1959–1963
Party name (in Norwegian)	Number of representatives
Labour Party (Arbeiderpartiet)	12
Communist Party (Kommunistiske Parti)	1
Christian Democratic Party (Kristelig Folkeparti)	3
Liberal Party (Venstre)	2
List of workers, fishermen, and small farmholders (Arbeidere, fiskere, småbrukere liste)	1
Local List(s) (Lokale lister)	16
Total number of members:	35

Lenvik herredsstyre 1955–1959
Party name (in Norwegian)	Number of representatives
Labour Party (Arbeiderpartiet)	13
Conservative Party (Høyre)	1
Communist Party (Kommunistiske Parti)	2
Christian Democratic Party (Kristelig Folkeparti)	2
Liberal Party (Venstre)	2
List of workers, fishermen, and small farmholders (Arbeidere, fiskere, småbrukere liste)	3
Local List(s) (Lokale lister)	12
Total number of members:	35

Lenvik herredsstyre 1951–1955
Party name (in Norwegian)	Number of representatives
Labour Party (Arbeiderpartiet)	11
Communist Party (Kommunistiske Parti)	2
Christian Democratic Party (Kristelig Folkeparti)	1
Liberal Party (Venstre)	3
List of workers, fishermen, and small farmholders (Arbeidere, fiskere, småbrukere liste)	2
Local List(s) (Lokale lister)	5
Total number of members:	24

Lenvik herredsstyre 1947–1951
Party name (in Norwegian)	Number of representatives
Labour Party (Arbeiderpartiet)	14
Communist Party (Kommunistiske Parti)	3
Christian Democratic Party (Kristelig Folkeparti)	1
Liberal Party (Venstre)	3
Local List(s) (Lokale lister)	3
Total number of members:	24

Lenvik herredsstyre 1945–1947
Party name (in Norwegian)	Number of representatives
Labour Party (Arbeiderpartiet)	12
Communist Party (Kommunistiske Parti)	2
Liberal Party (Venstre)	1
List of workers, fishermen, and small farmholders (Arbeidere, fiskere, småbrukere liste)	2
Joint List(s) of Non-Socialist Parties (Borgerlige Felleslister)	1
Local List(s) (Lokale lister)	6
Total number of members:	24

Lenvik herredsstyre 1937–1941*
Party name (in Norwegian)	Number of representatives
Labour Party (Arbeiderpartiet)	16
Liberal Party (Venstre)	4
List of workers, fishermen, and small farmholders (Arbeidere, fiskere, småbrukere liste)	1
Joint List(s) of Non-Socialist Parties (Borgerlige Felleslister)	1
Local List(s) (Lokale lister)	2
Total number of members:	24
Note: Due to the German occupation of Norway during World War II, no elections were held for new municipal councils until after the war ended in 1945.

=== Mayors ===
The mayor (Norwegian: ordfører) of Lenvik Municipality is the political leader of the municipality and the chairperson of the municipal council. Here is a list of people who have held this position:

- 1838–1846: Rev. Hans Hall
- 1857–1857: Rev. Schumann
- 1865–1867: Christoffer Johansen
- 1867–1870: Hans Kjeldahl
- 1879–1892: Dr. Oskar Normann Eng (V)
- 1893–1901: Mikal Nilsen Bell (V)
- 1901–1904: Hans Andreas Henningsøn Irgens
- 1905–1921: Lorentz Hansen
- 1921–1925: Sven Eidissen
- 1926–1935: Søren Sørensen Hannes (Ap)
- 1935–1941: Søren Berg Sørensen Moen (Ap)
- 1941–1941: Oscar Didriksen
- 1941–1945: Ingvald Th. Sørvig
- 1945–1945: Søren Sørensen Hannes
- 1945–1954: Bjarne Daniel Solli (Ap)
- 1954–1957: Laurits Olsen (Ap)
- 1957–1964: Erling Nilsen (V)
- 1964–1968: Birger Gjerdrum (Ap)
- 1968–1971: Karl Steffensen (Ap)
- 1971–1975: Oddmar Mathiassen (KrF)
- 1975–1979: Arvid Johnsgård (Ap)
- 1979–1983: Trygve Stefanussen (H)
- 1983–1987: Arvid Johnsgård (Ap)
- 1987–1995: Arne Bergland (Ap)
- 1995–2001: Åge Konradsen (H)
- 2001–2007: Arne Bergland (Ap)
- 2007–2011: Martin Ness (Ap)
- 2011–2019: Geir-Inge Sivertsen (H)

== Media gallery ==
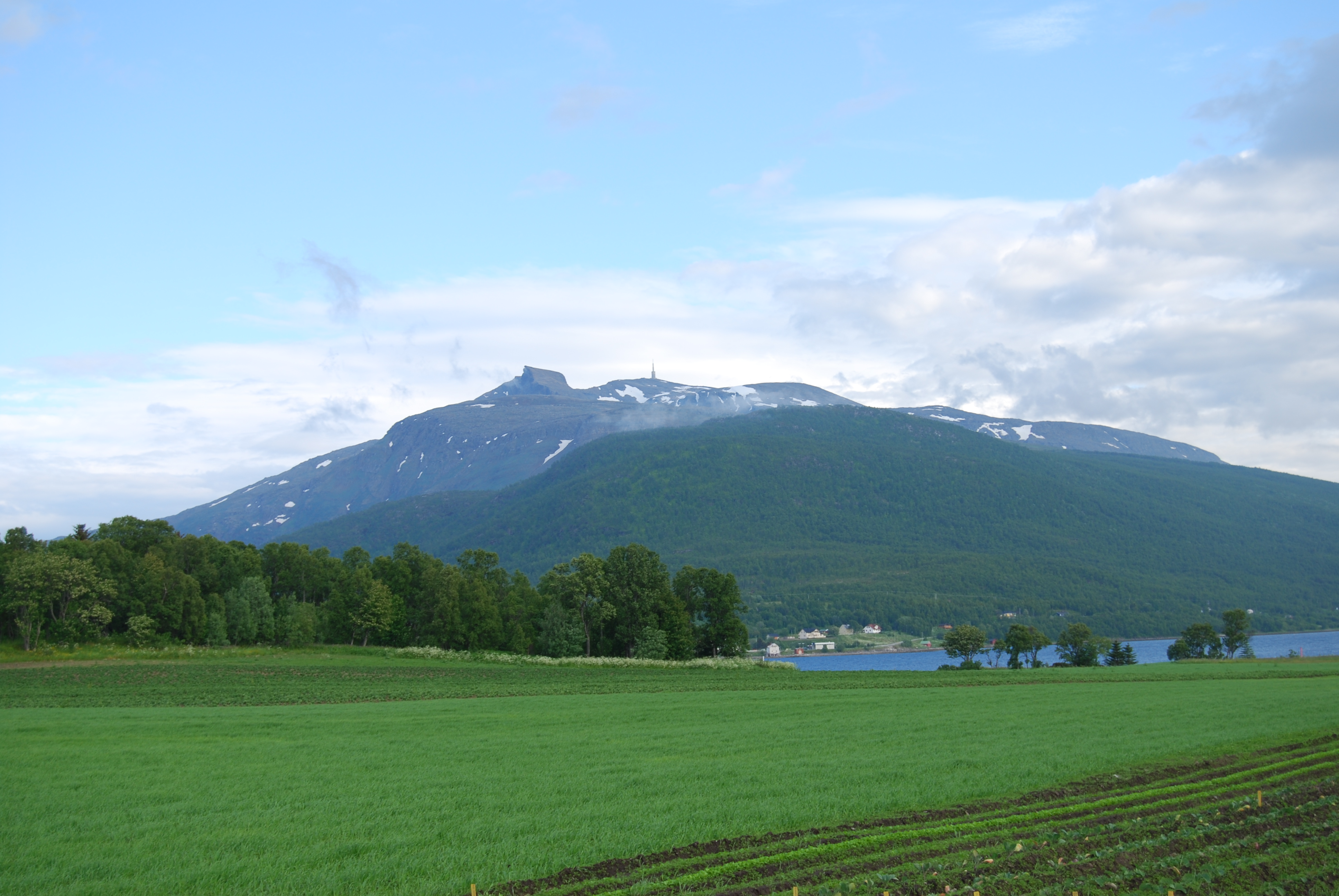
View from Gibostad village on Senja island towards Kistefjellet mountain on the mainland

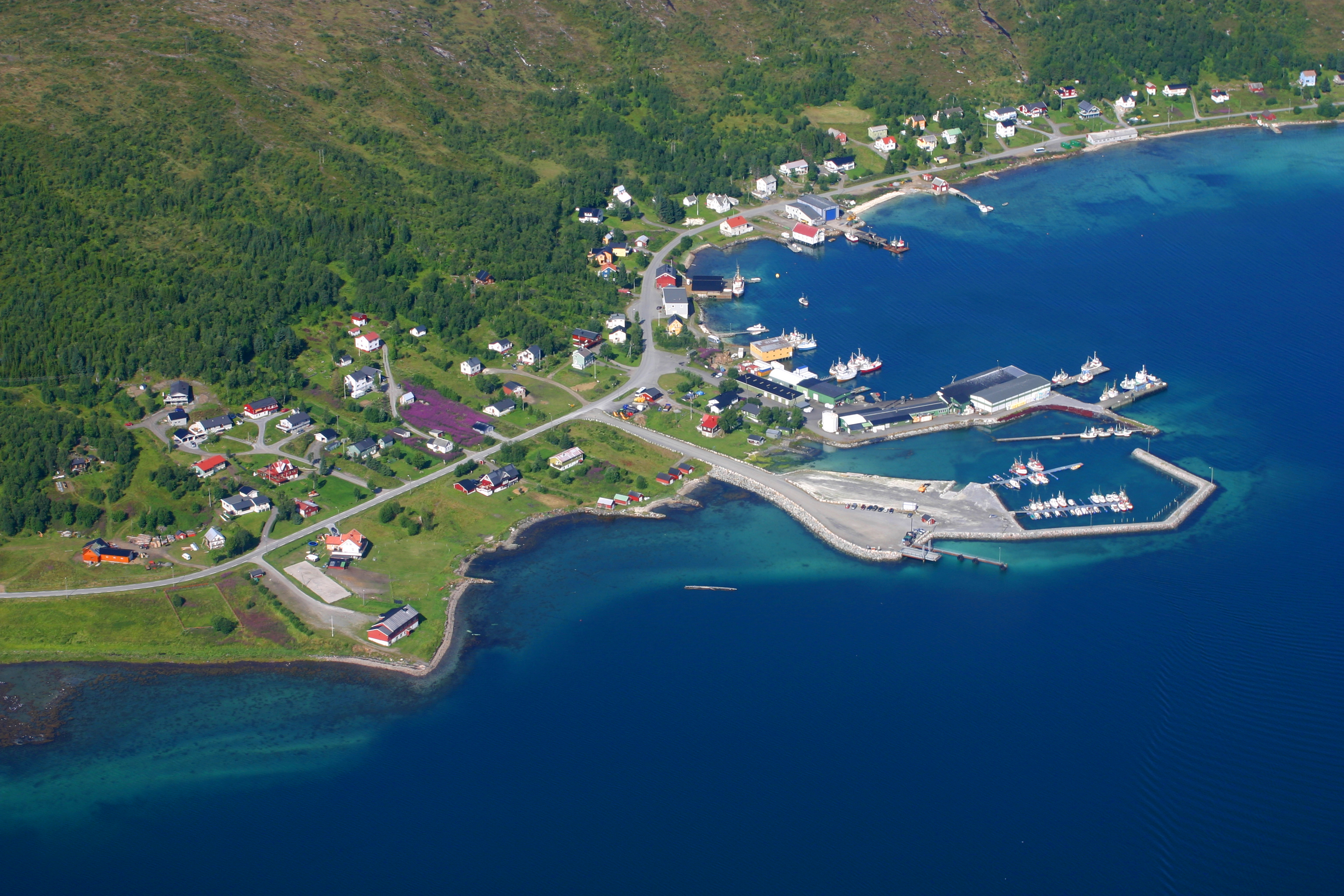
View of Botnhamn

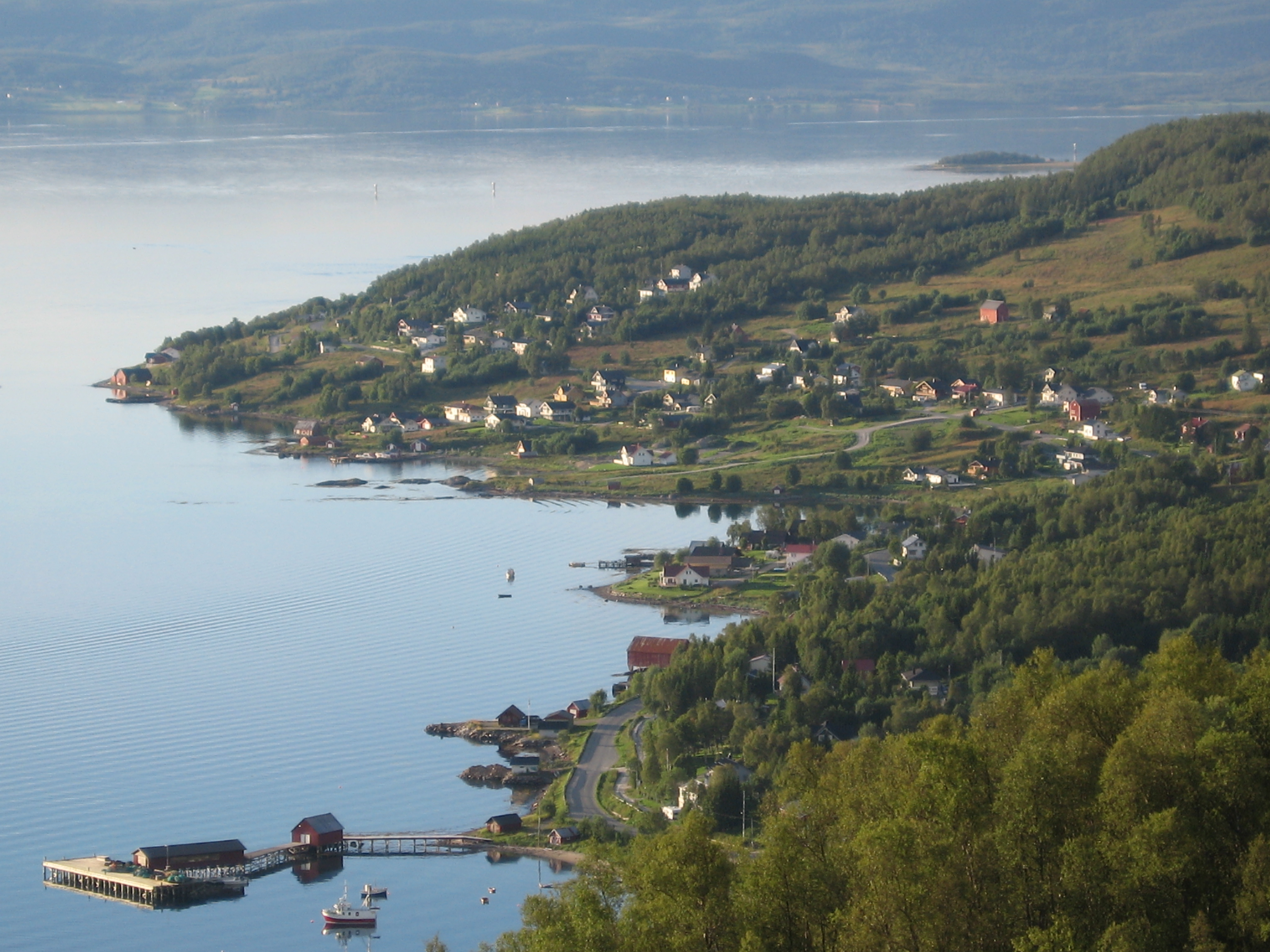
View of Trollvik

== See also ==
- List of former municipalities of Norway
