= Malangen =

Malangen may refer to:

== Places ==
- Malangen (fjord), a fjord in Troms county, Norway
- Malangen Municipality, a former municipality in Troms county, Norway
- Malangen Church, a church in Balsfjord Municipality in Troms county, Norway

== Other ==
- FV Malangen, a Norwegian boat that served during World War II
