= Lysvatnet =

Lysvatnet is the name of several lakes in Norway:

- Lysvatnet (Troms), a lake in Senja municipality in Troms county, Norway
- Lysvatnet (Meløy), a lake in Meløy municipality in Nordland county, Norway
- Lysvatnet (Nordland), a lake in Steinkjer municipality in Trøndelag county, Norway
