= Reipå =

Village in Meløy Municipality, Norway

- Village
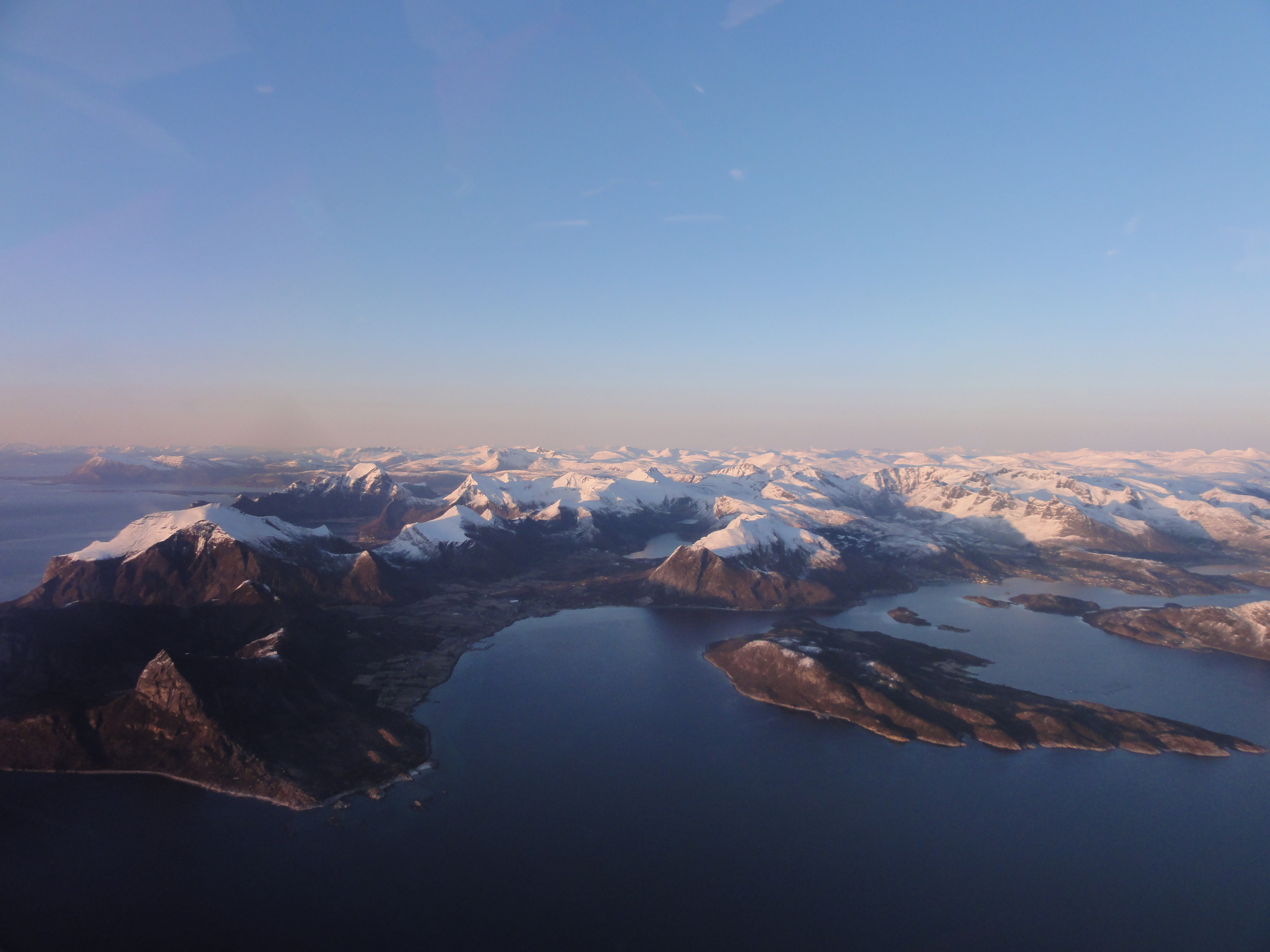
- View of the village
- Interactive map of Reipå
- Location within Nordland Location within Norway
- Coordinates: 66.9099°N 13.6370°E
- Country: Norway
- Region: Northern Norway
- County: Nordland
- District: Salten
- Municipality: Meløy Municipality

Area
  - Total: 0.45 km^{2} (0.17 sq mi)
- Elevation: 10 m (33 ft)

Population (2023)
  - Total: 266
  - Density: 591/km^{2} (1,530/sq mi)
- Time zone: UTC+01:00 (CET)
  - Summer (DST): UTC+02:00 (CEST)
- Post Code: 8146 Reipå

Reipå is a village in Meløy Municipality in Nordland county, Norway. It is located along Norwegian County Road 17 about 6 kilometres (3.7 mi) north of the village of Ørnes. The lakes Lysvatnet and Markvatnet both lie to the east of the village. Fore Church is located in Reipå, serving northern Meløy.

The 0.45-square-kilometre (110-acre) village has a population (2023) of 266 and a population density of 591 inhabitants per square kilometre (1,530/sq mi).
