= Mortenhals =

Village in Balsfjord Municipality, Norway

Mortenhals Mortenshals
- Village
- Interactive map of Mortenhals
- Location within Troms Location within Norway
- Coordinates: 69.4001°N 18.5960°E
- Country: Norway
- Region: Northern Norway
- County: Troms
- District: Hålogaland
- Municipality: Balsfjord Municipality
- Elevation: 8 m (26 ft)
- Time zone: UTC+01:00 (CET)
  - Summer (DST): UTC+02:00 (CEST)
- Post Code: 9056 Mortenhals

Mortenhals or Mortenshals is a village in Balsfjord Municipality in Troms county, Norway. The village is located along the Malangen fjord, across the fjord from Rossfjordstraumen. The village of Mestervik is located about 15 kilometres (9.3 mi) to the south. Malangen Church is located here. This village was the administrative centre of the old Malangen Municipality which existed from 1871 until 1964.
