= Gibostad =

Village in Senja Municipality, Norway

Gibostad: Gibostad (Norwegian); Čoalbmi (Northern Sami)
- Village
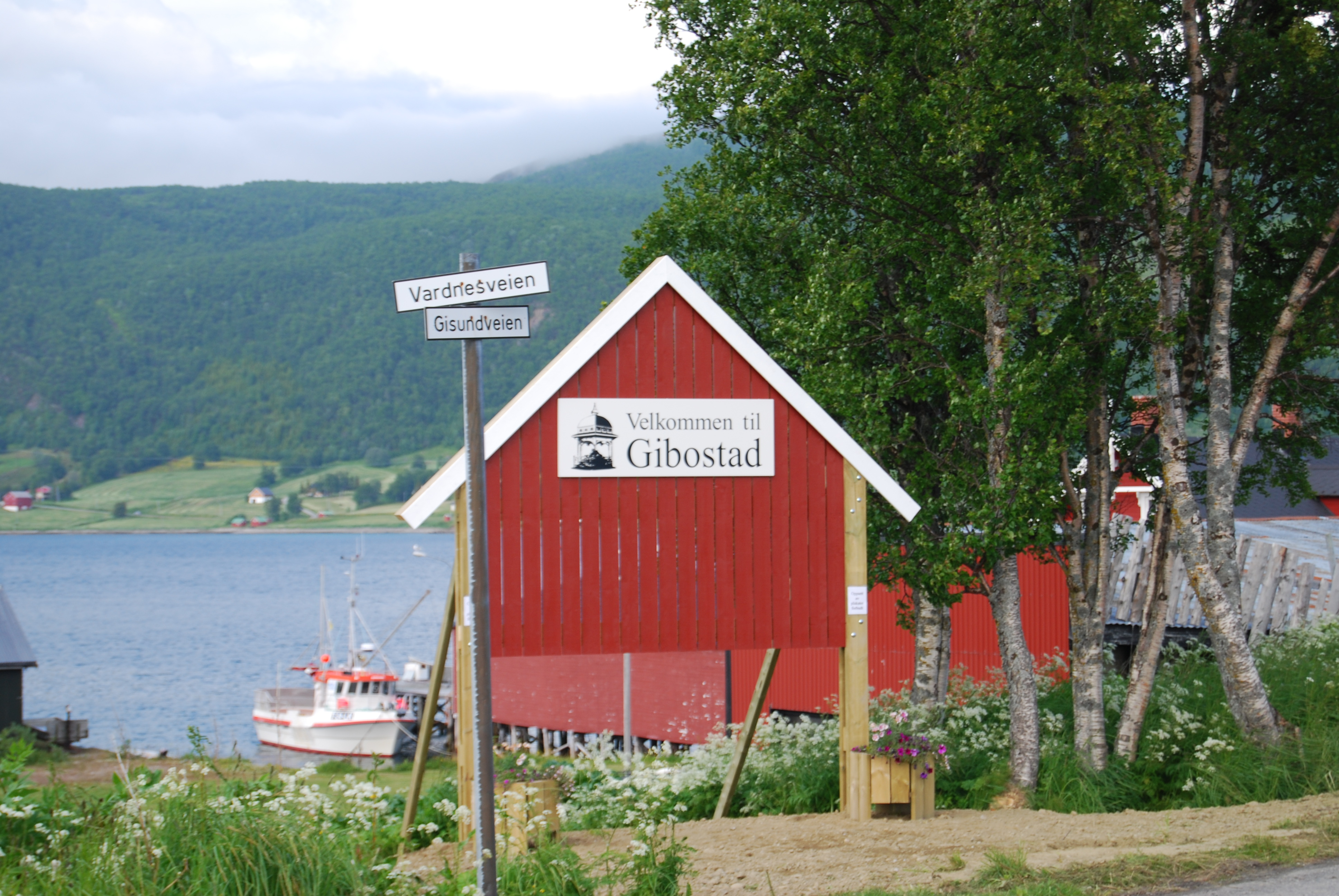
- View of the village
- Interactive map of Gibostad
- Location within Troms Location within Norway
- Coordinates: 69°21′18″N 18°04′31″E
- Country: Norway
- Region: Northern Norway
- County: Troms
- District: Midt-Troms
- Municipality: Senja Municipality

Area
  - Total: 0.41 km^{2} (0.16 sq mi)
- Elevation: 8 m (26 ft)

Population (2023)
  - Total: 312
  - Density: 761/km^{2} (1,970/sq mi)
- Time zone: UTC+01:00 (CET)
  - Summer (DST): UTC+02:00 (CEST)
- Post Code: 9372 Gibostad

Gibostad (Norwegian) or Čoalbmi (Northern Sami) is a village on the large island of Senja in Senja Municipality in Troms county, Norway. Gibostad is a former trading centre, located about 20 kilometres (12 mi) north of the Gisund Bridge. Many of the buildings in the harbour area are about 200 years old. The soil is very fertile and therefore suitable for farming, which is why there is an agricultural school at Senja Upper Secondary School. The lake Lysvatnet is located just west of the village.

The 0.41-square-kilometre (100-acre) village has a population (2023) of 312 and a population density of 761 inhabitants per square kilometre (1,970/sq mi).

For a long time, Gibostad was the administrative centre of the old Lenvik Municipality, but the administration was moved to Finnsnes during the 1960s, following the growth of that town. Gibostad is the largest village on northern part of the island of Senja, located about midway between Botnhamn and Finnsnes, where the strait of Gisundet is narrowest. The village of Bjorelvnes and Lenvik Church lie directly across the strait from Gibostad.
