= Fore Church =

Church in Nordland, Norway

- Fore kirke
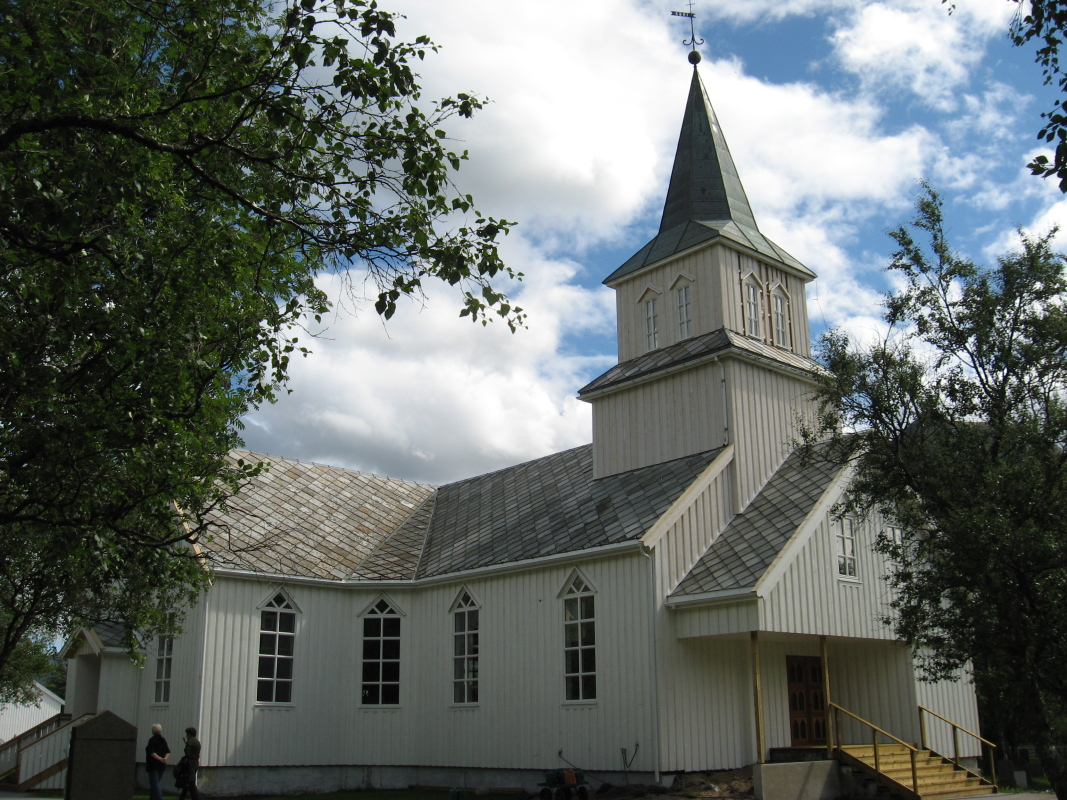
- View of the church
- Fore Church
- 66.90949228°N 13.6337596°E
- Location: Meløy Municipality, Nordland
- Country: Norway
- Denomination: Church of Norway
- Churchmanship: Evangelical Lutheran

History
- Status: Parish church
- Founded: 1909
- Consecrated: 17 June 1909

Architecture
- Functional status: Active
- Architect: O. M. Olsen
- Architectural type: cruciform
- Style: Neo-Gothic
- Completed: 1909 (117 years ago)

Specifications
- Capacity: 450
- Materials: Wood

Administration
- Diocese: Sør-Hålogaland
- Deanery: Bodø domprosti
- Parish: Fore og Meløy
- Norwegian Cultural Heritage Site
- Type: Church
- Status: Not protected
- ID: 84180

Fore Church (Norwegian: Fore kirke) is a parish church of the Church of Norway in Meløy Municipality in Nordland county, Norway. It is located in the village of Reipå. It is one of the churches for the Fore og Meløy parish which is part of the Bodø domprosti (deanery) in the Diocese of Sør-Hålogaland. The white, wooden church was built in 1909 using plans drawn up by the architect O. M. Olsen. The church seats about 450 people.

== History ==
The church was originally built in 1909 in a neo-gothic, long church style. It was consecrated on 17 June 1909. In 1932, the church was renovated and expanded by adding two transepts to give it a cruciform design.

== See also ==
- List of churches in Sør-Hålogaland
