= Åge Konradsen =

Norwegian politician (born 1954)

Åge Konradsen (born 28 September 1954 in Lenvik Municipality) is a Norwegian politician for the Conservative Party.

He was elected to the Norwegian Parliament from Troms in 2001, but was not re-elected in 2005. He had previously served as a deputy representative during the term 1997–2001.

Konradsen was a member of the municipal council of Lenvik Municipality from 1991 to 2001, serving as mayor since 1995. He became leader of the county party chapter in 1993.

Outside politics he worked as a primary school teacher and bureaucrat.
