= Markvatnet =

Lake in Meløy, Norway

- Markavatnet
- Interactive map of the lake
- Location: Meløy Municipality, Nordland
- Coordinates: 66.9064°N 13.7610°E
- Basin countries: Norway
- Max. length: 3.5 kilometres (2.2 mi)
- Max. width: 800 metres (2,600 ft)
- Surface area: 2.28 km^{2} (0.88 sq mi)
- Shore length^{1}: 8 kilometres (5.0 mi)
- Surface elevation: 26 metres (85 ft)
- References: NVE
- ^{1} Shore length is not a well-defined measure.

Markvatnet is a lake that lies in Meløy Municipality in Nordland county, Norway. The 2.28-square-kilometre (0.88 sq mi) lake is located about 4 kilometres (2.5 mi) east of the village of Reipå and the same distance north of the municipal centre of Ørnes. The lake Lysvatnet lies about 3 kilometres (1.9 mi) to the east of Markvatnet.

== See also ==
- List of lakes in Norway
