= Malangen Municipality =

Former municipality in Troms, Norway

Malangen Municipality Malangen herred
- Former municipality
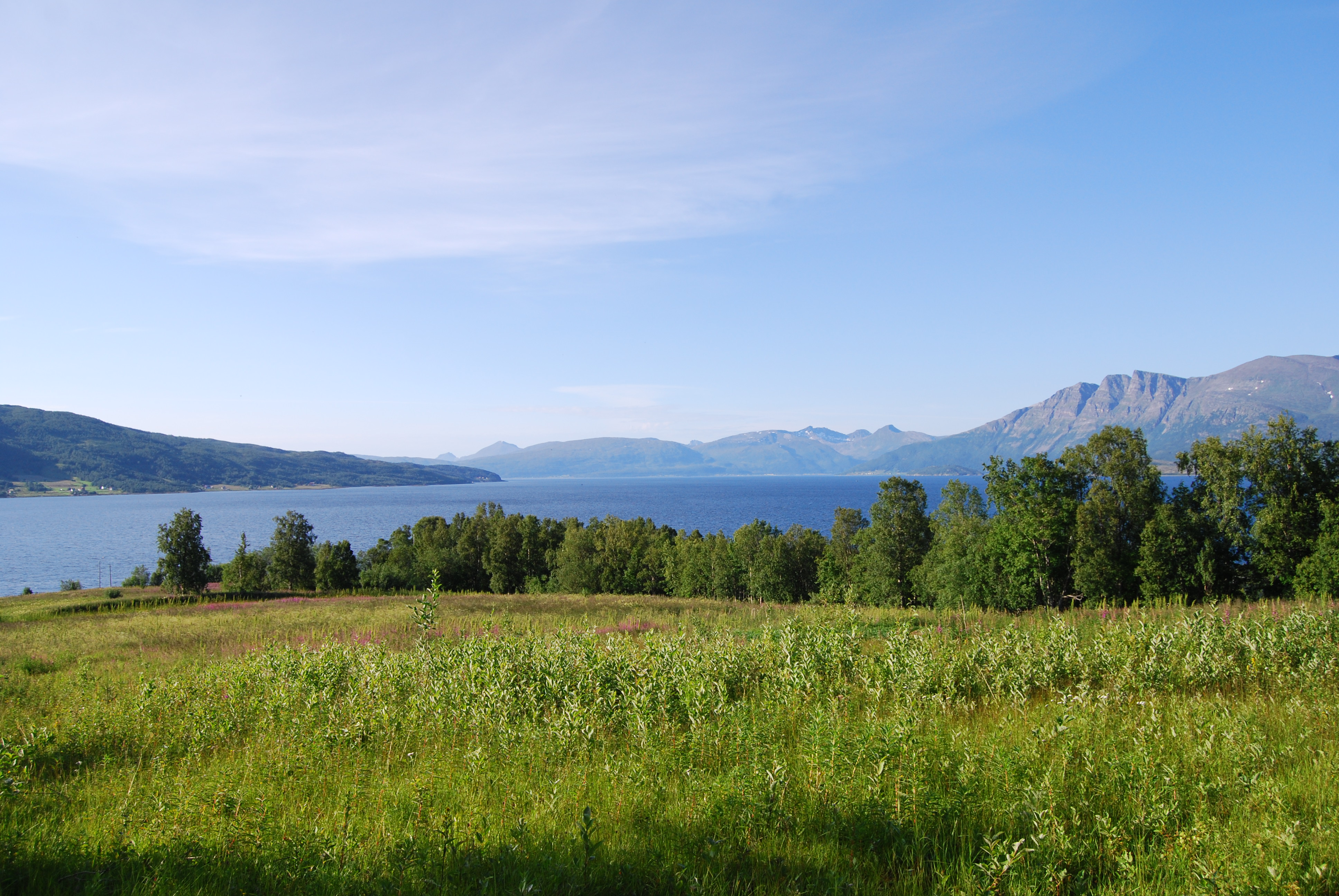
- View of Malangen

- Troms within Norway

- Malangen within Troms
- Coordinates: 69°21′8″N 18°50′51″E
- Country: Norway
- County: Troms
- District: Hålogaland
- Established: 1 Jan 1871
  - Preceded by: Balsfjord Municipality and Lenvik Municipality
- Disestablished: 1 Jan 1964
  - Succeeded by: Balsfjord Municipality and Målselv Municipality
- Administrative centre: Mortenhals

Government
  - Mayor (1956-1963): Alfred Sagelvmo (Ap)

Area (upon dissolution)
  - Total: 372.2 km^{2} (143.7 sq mi)
  - Rank: #244 in Norway
- Highest elevation: 1,326 m (4,350 ft)

Population (1963)
  - Total: 2,090
  - Rank: #421 in Norway
  - Density: 5.6/km^{2} (15/sq mi)
  - Change (10 years): ▼ −7.2%
- Demonym(s): Malangsfjerding; Malangsværing

Official language
  - Norwegian form: Bokmål
- Time zone: UTC+01:00 (CET)
  - Summer (DST): UTC+02:00 (CEST)
- ISO 3166 code: NO-1932

Malangen (Northern Sami: Málatvuotna or Kven: Malankivuono) is a former municipality in Troms county in Norway. The 372-square-kilometre (144 sq mi) municipality existed from 1871 until its dissolution in 1964. The old municipality surrounded the Malangen fjord and today that area is divided between several municipalities: Balsfjord, Lenvik, Tromsø, and Målselv. The administrative centre was the village of Mortenhals where the main church for the municipality, Malangen Church, is located.

Prior to its dissolution in 1964, the 372.2-square-kilometre (143.7 sq mi) municipality was the 244th largest by area out of the 689 municipalities in Norway. Malangen Municipality was the 421st most populous municipality in Norway with a population of about 2,090. The municipality's population density was 5.6 inhabitants per square kilometre (15/sq mi) and its population had decreased by 7.2% over the previous 10-year period.

== General information ==
The parish of Malangen was established as a municipality on 1 January 1871 when the northern district of Balsfjord Municipality and a small peninsula along the Malangen fjord that belonged to Lenvik Municipality were separated to form the new municipality of Malangen. The initial population of Malangen was 1,425. On 1 January 1873, an area in the northern part of Malangen Municipality (population: 287) was transferred to the neighboring Tromsøysund Municipality. In 1891, a small area around the village of Målsnes in Målselv Municipality (population: 30) was transferred to Malangen Municipality.

During the 1960s, there were many municipal mergers across Norway due to the work of the Schei Committee. On 1 January 1964, Malangen Municipality ceased to exist. The peninsula including the Navaren and Målsnes areas (population: 118) were transferred to the neighboring Målselv Municipality. The remaining areas of Malangen (population: 1,940) were transferred back into Balsfjord Municipality.

=== Name ===
The municipality (originally the parish) is named after the local Malangen fjord (Old Norse: Malangr). The first element is mál which comes from the Old High German word malaha which means "bag" or "leather bag" which may refer to the baggy shape of the fjord. The same word mál is probably also the origin of the name of the Målselva, the big river that enters the fjord from the Målselvdalen and Bardudalen valleys (the neighboring Målselv Municipality has a similar etymology). The last element of the name is angr which means "inlet" or "narrow fjord".

=== Churches ===
The Church of Norway had one parish (sokn) within Malangen Municipality. It was part of the Balsfjord prestegjeld and the Indre Troms prosti (deanery) in the Diocese of Nord-Hålogaland.

Churches in Malangen Municipality
Parish (sokn)	Church name	Location of the church	Year built
Malangen	Malangen Church	Mortenhals	1853

== History ==
The Saga of Haakon Haakonarson mentions that in 1242 the king allowed refugees from Bjarmaland (since they were attacked by the Tatars - «bjarmar rymdi fyrir tattarum») to settle in the area of Malangen.

== Geography ==
The highest point in the municipality was the 1,326-metre (4,350 ft) tall mountain Mårfjellet on the border with Balsfjord Municipality and Målselv Municipality.

== Government ==
While it existed, Malangen Municipality was responsible for primary education (through 10th grade), outpatient health services, senior citizen services, welfare and other social services, zoning, economic development, and municipal roads and utilities. The municipality was governed by a municipal council of directly elected representatives. The mayor was indirectly elected by a vote of the municipal council. The municipality was under the jurisdiction of the Hålogaland Court of Appeal.

=== Municipal council ===
The municipal council (Kommunestyre) of Malangen Municipality was made up of 19 representatives that were elected to four year terms. The tables below show the historical composition of the council by political party.

Malangen herredsstyre 1959–1963
Party name (in Norwegian)	Number of representatives
Labour Party (Arbeiderpartiet)	11
Centre Party (Senterpartiet)	3
Liberal Party (Venstre)	5
Total number of members:	19
Note: On 1 January 1964, Malangen Municipality became part of Balsfjord Municipality and Målselv Municipality.

Malangen herredsstyre 1955–1959
Party name (in Norwegian)	Number of representatives
Labour Party (Arbeiderpartiet)	9
Communist Party (Kommunistiske Parti)	1
Farmers' Party (Bondepartiet)	2
Liberal Party (Venstre)	7
Total number of members:	19

Malangen herredsstyre 1951–1955
Party name (in Norwegian)	Number of representatives
Labour Party (Arbeiderpartiet)	8
Communist Party (Kommunistiske Parti)	1
Joint List(s) of Non-Socialist Parties (Borgerlige Felleslister)	7
Total number of members:	16

Malangen herredsstyre 1947–1951
Party name (in Norwegian)	Number of representatives
Labour Party (Arbeiderpartiet)	8
Communist Party (Kommunistiske Parti)	1
Joint List(s) of Non-Socialist Parties (Borgerlige Felleslister)	7
Total number of members:	16

Malangen herredsstyre 1945–1947
Party name (in Norwegian)	Number of representatives
Labour Party (Arbeiderpartiet)	8
Communist Party (Kommunistiske Parti)	1
Joint List(s) of Non-Socialist Parties (Borgerlige Felleslister)	5
Local List(s) (Lokale lister)	2
Total number of members:	16

Malangen herredsstyre 1937–1941*
Party name (in Norwegian)	Number of representatives
Labour Party (Arbeiderpartiet)	8
Joint List(s) of Non-Socialist Parties (Borgerlige Felleslister)	8
Total number of members:	16
Note: Due to the German occupation of Norway during World War II, no elections were held for new municipal councils until after the war ended in 1945.

=== Mayors ===
The mayor (Norwegian: ordfører) of Malangen Municipality was the political leader of the municipality and the chairperson of the municipal council. The following people have held this position:

- 1871–1874: Nils Andreas Kristoffersen (photo)
- 1875–1876: Elias Nilsen
- 1877–1878: Anders Kristiansen
- 1879–1880: Nils Kristoffersen
- 1881–1884: Anders Kristiansen
- 1885–1896: Peter Kjeldseth
- 1897–1898: Brynjulf B. Bjørkli
- 1899–1913: T. Furustøl
- 1914–1916: Hilmar Berg
- 1917–1928: Bernt Christoffersen
- 1929–1931: Hilmar Hansen
- 1932–1937: Nils Gjertsen
- 1938–1941: Olav Gabrielsen
- 1942–1945: Tollef Tollefsen (NS)
- 1945–1945: Olav Gabrielsen
- 1946–1955: Petter Staff (Ap)
- 1956–1963: Alfred Sagelvmo (Ap)

== Media gallery ==
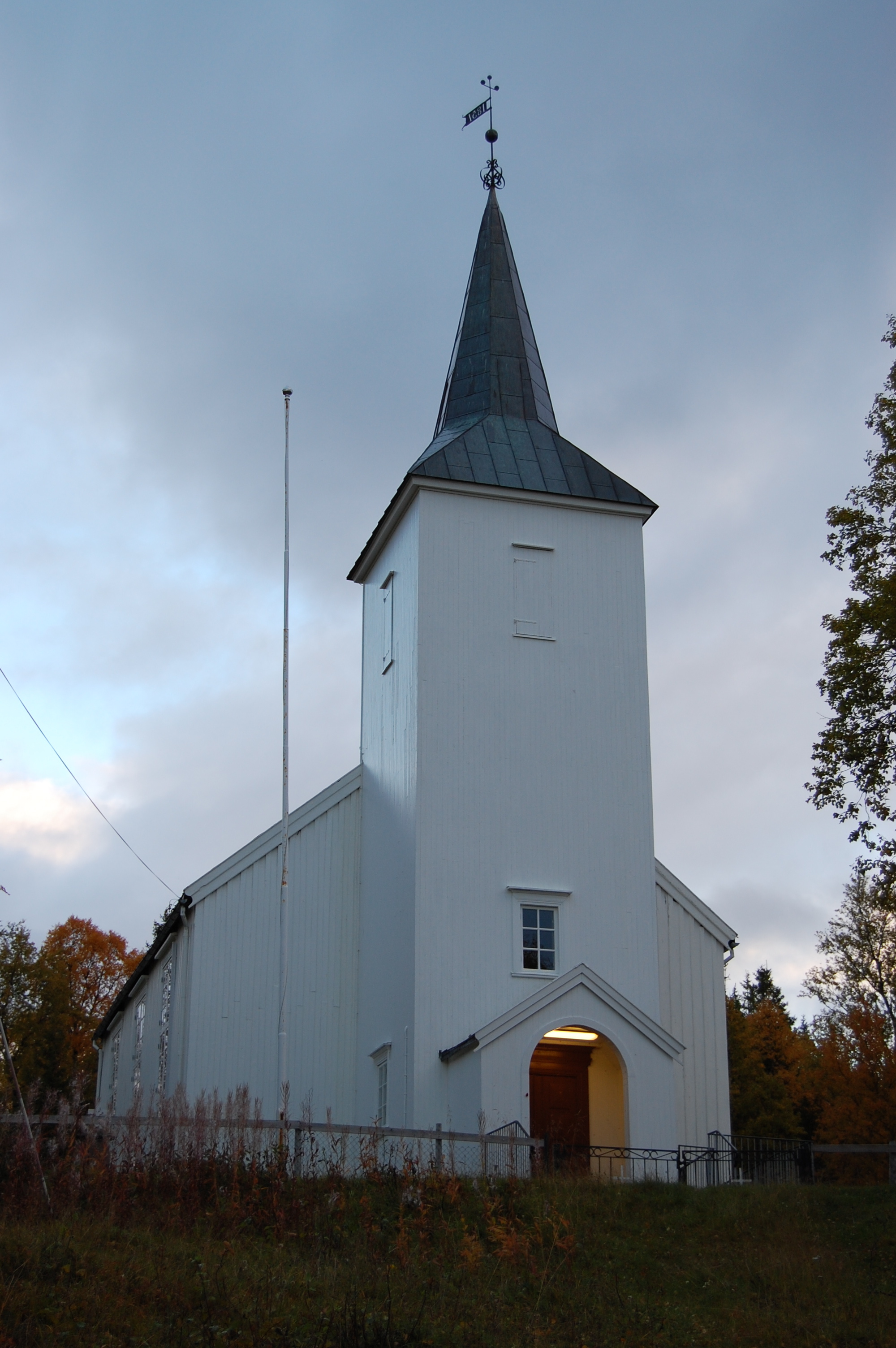
Malangen Church

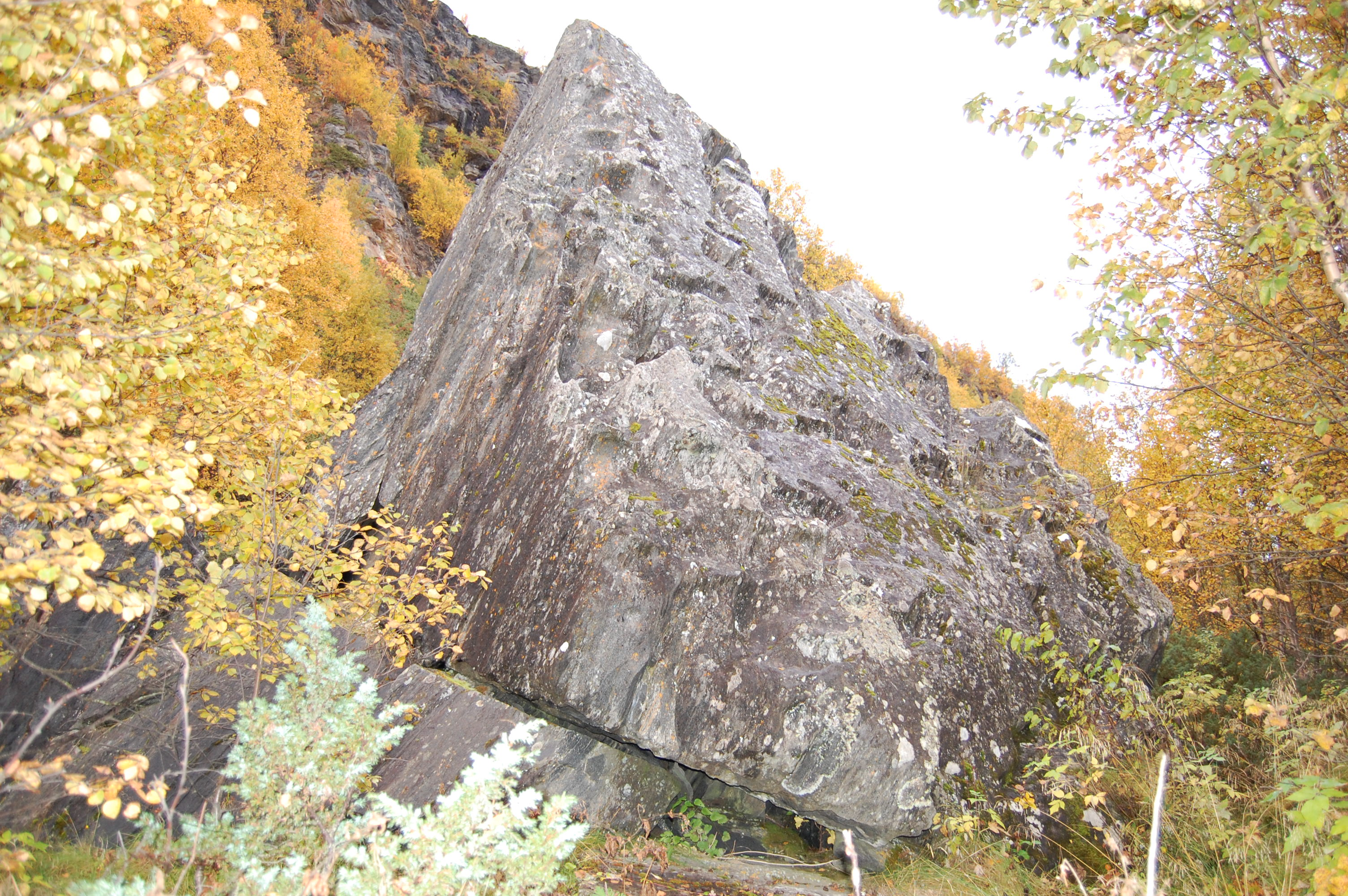
Rambergkirka: A stone located at Sand

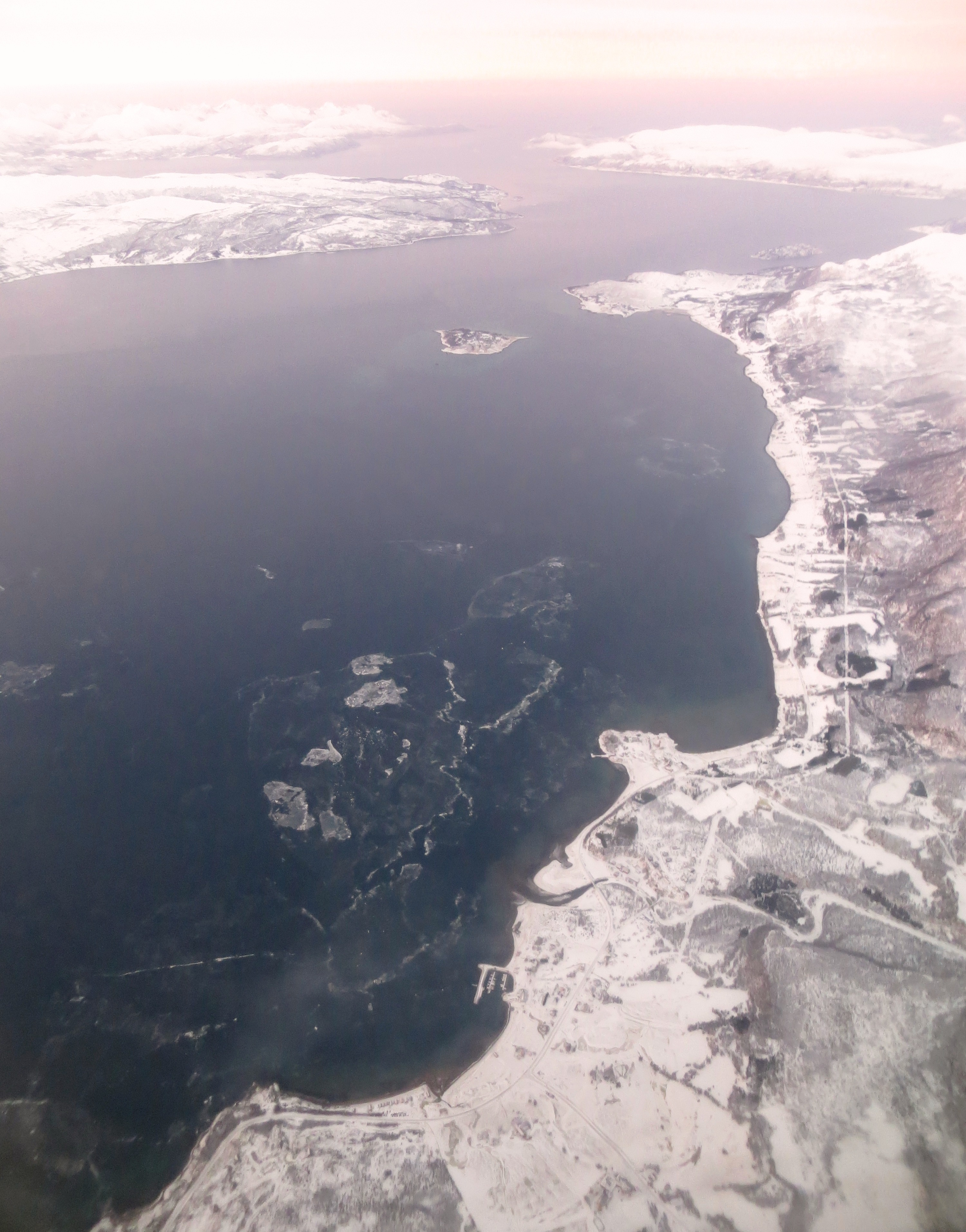
The Mortenhals area (foreground), looking northwest

== See also ==
- List of former municipalities of Norway
