= Rossfjord Church =

- Rossfjord kirke
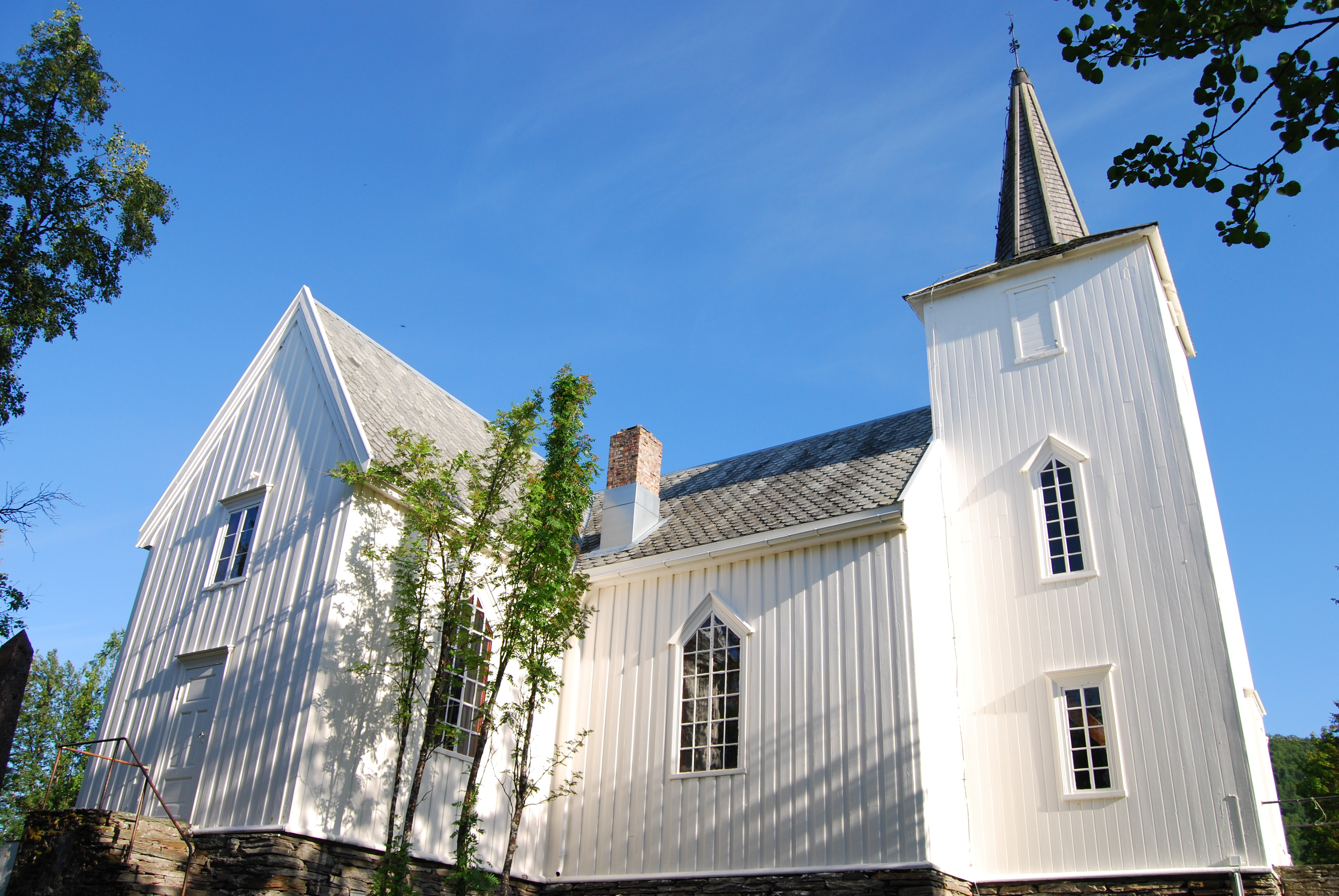
- View of the church
- Rossfjord Church
- 69.392705°N 18.398795°E
- Location: Senja Municipality, Troms
- Country: Norway
- Denomination: Church of Norway
- Churchmanship: Evangelical Lutheran

History
- Status: Parish church
- Founded: 1885
- Consecrated: 1885

Architecture
- Functional status: Active
- Architectural type: Cruciform
- Completed: 1885 (141 years ago)

Specifications
- Capacity: 250
- Materials: Wood

Administration
- Diocese: Nord-Hålogaland
- Deanery: Senja prosti
- Parish: Lenvik
- Norwegian Cultural Heritage Site
- Type: Church
- Status: Listed
- ID: 85318

Rossfjord Church (Norwegian: Rossfjord kirke) is a parish church of the Church of Norway in Senja Municipality in Troms county, Norway. It is located just northeast of the village of Rossfjordstraumen, along the coast of the Malangen fjord. It is one of the churches in the Lenvik parish which is part of the Senja prosti (deanery) in the Diocese of Nord-Hålogaland. The white, wooden church was built in a cruciform style here in 1885. The church seats about 250 people.

== History ==
The white, wooden church was originally built in a cruciform style in 1822 in Lenvik at the Lenvik Church. It was designed using plans drawn up by an unknown architect. When a new Lenvik Church was constructed, this building was taken down and moved to its present location in Rossfjordstraumen in 1885 where it was rebuilt. The first worship service held in the newly reconstructed church was on 2 August 1885.

== Media gallery ==
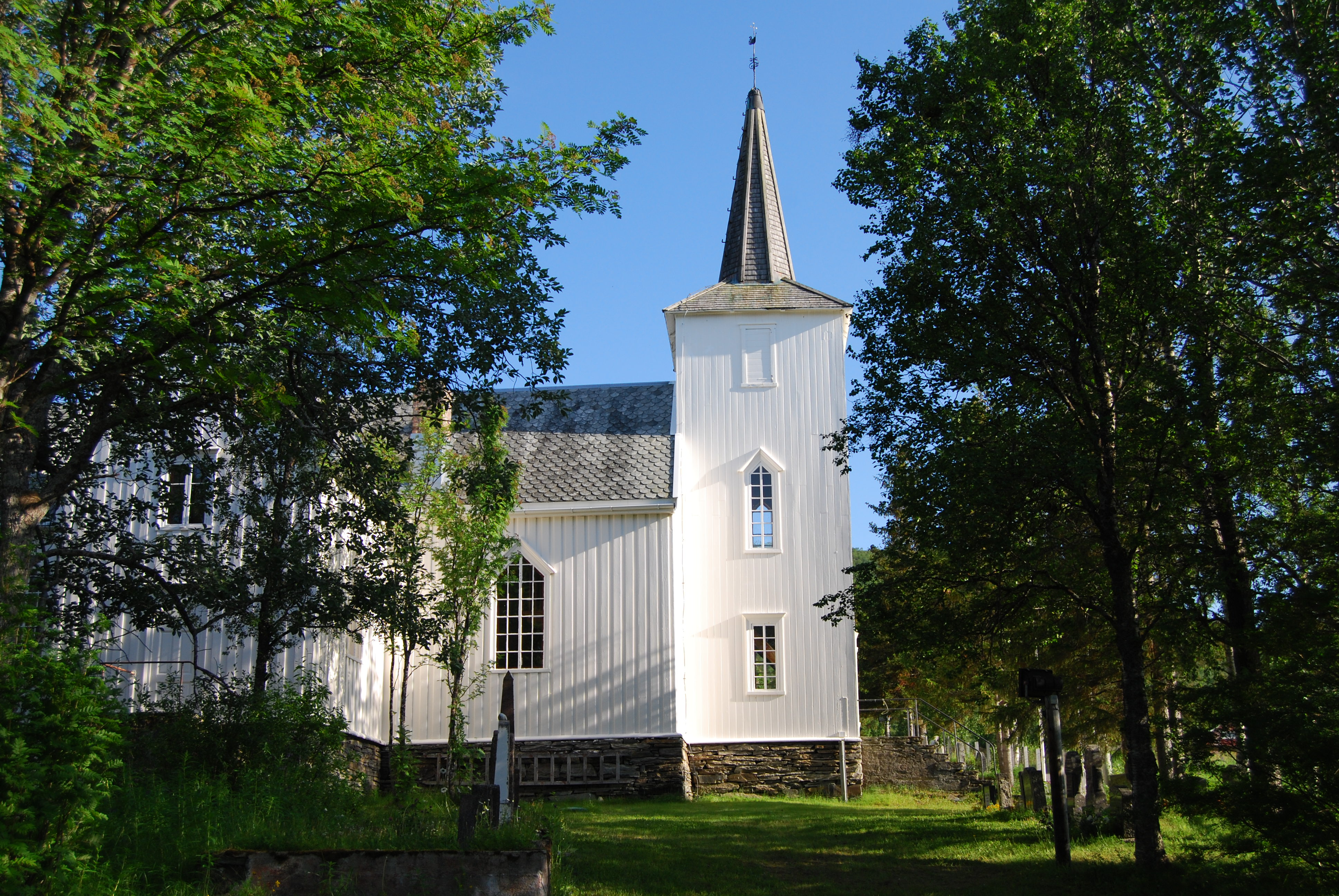

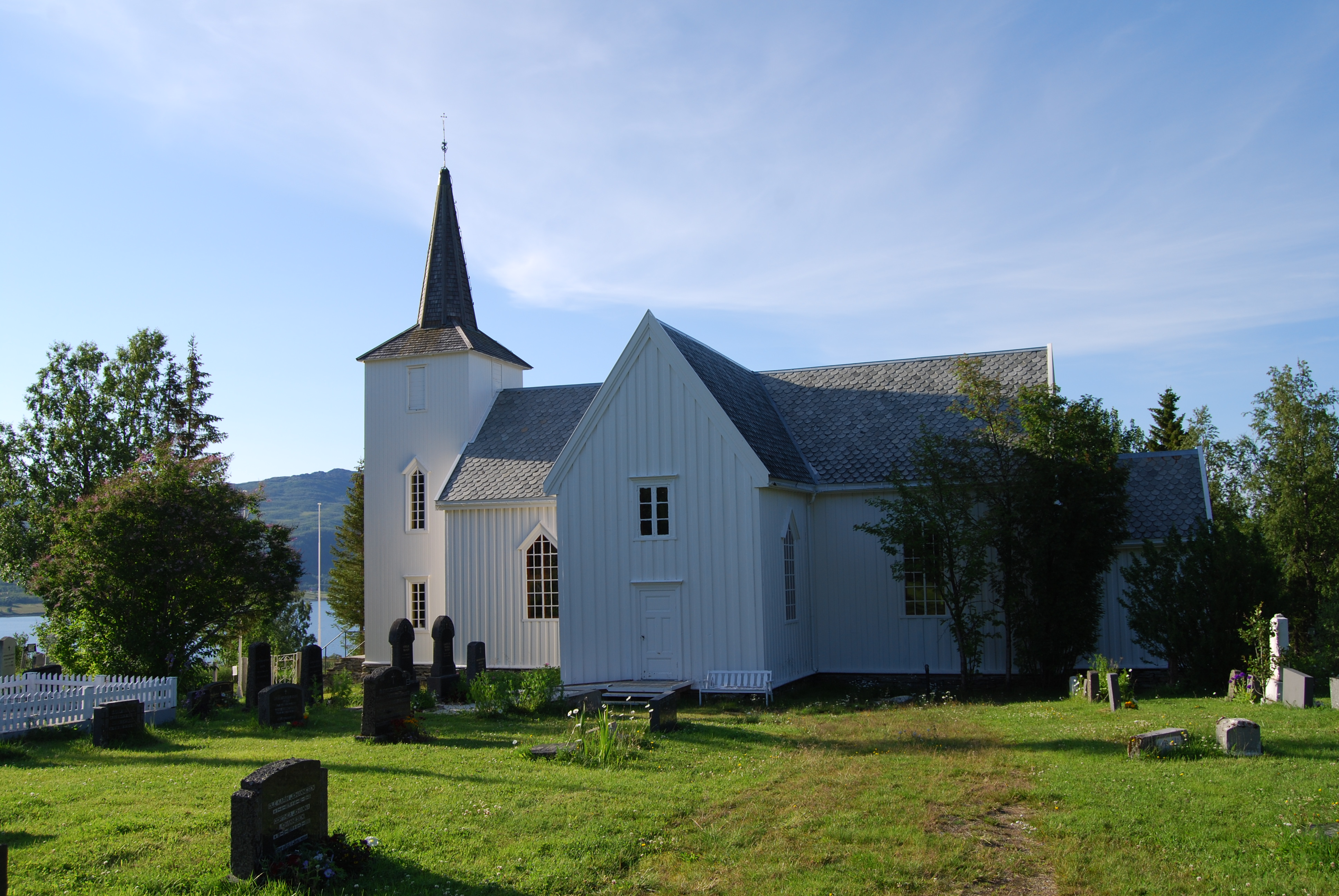

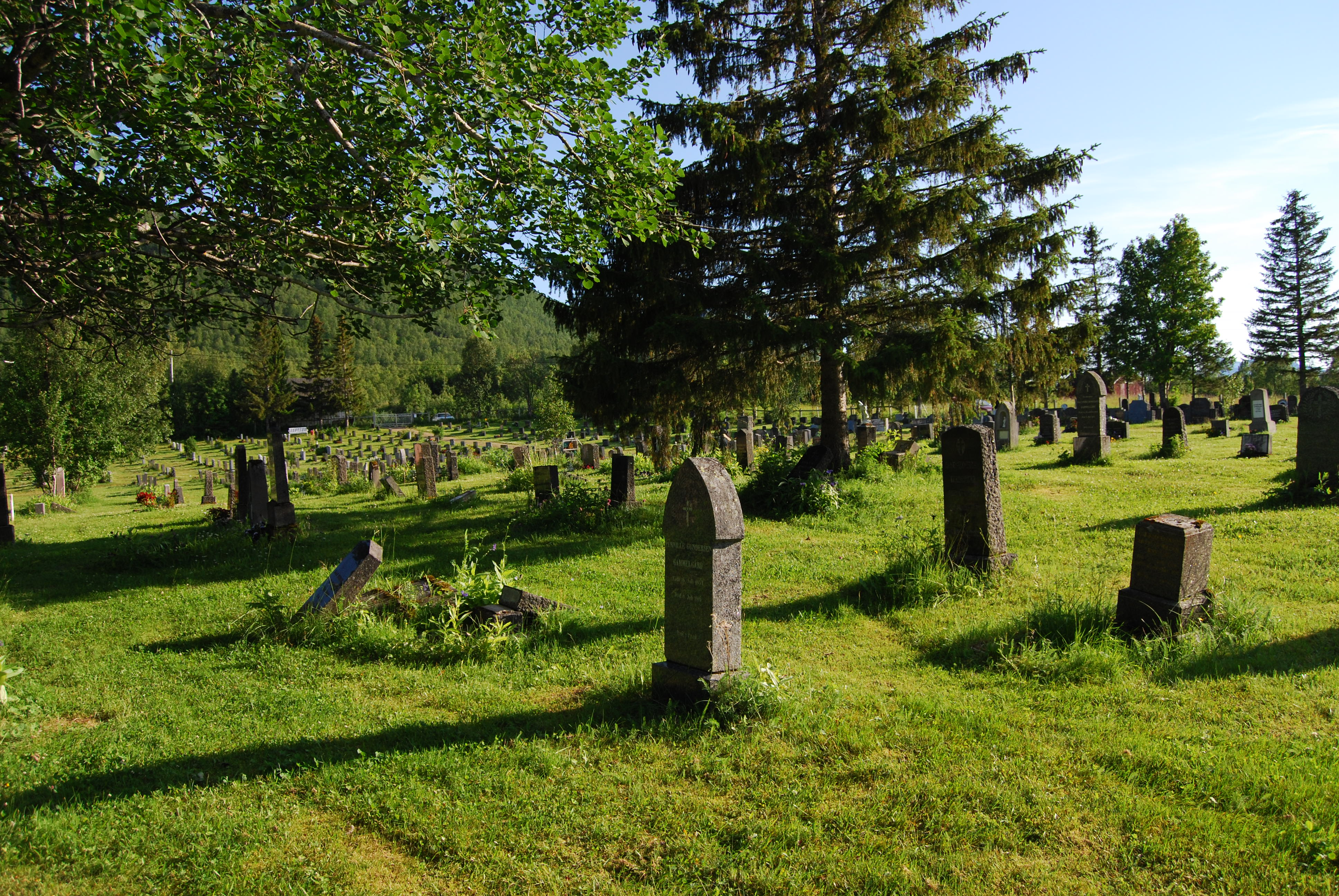

== See also ==
- List of churches in Nord-Hålogaland
