= Botnhamn =

Village in Senja Municipality, Norway

- Village
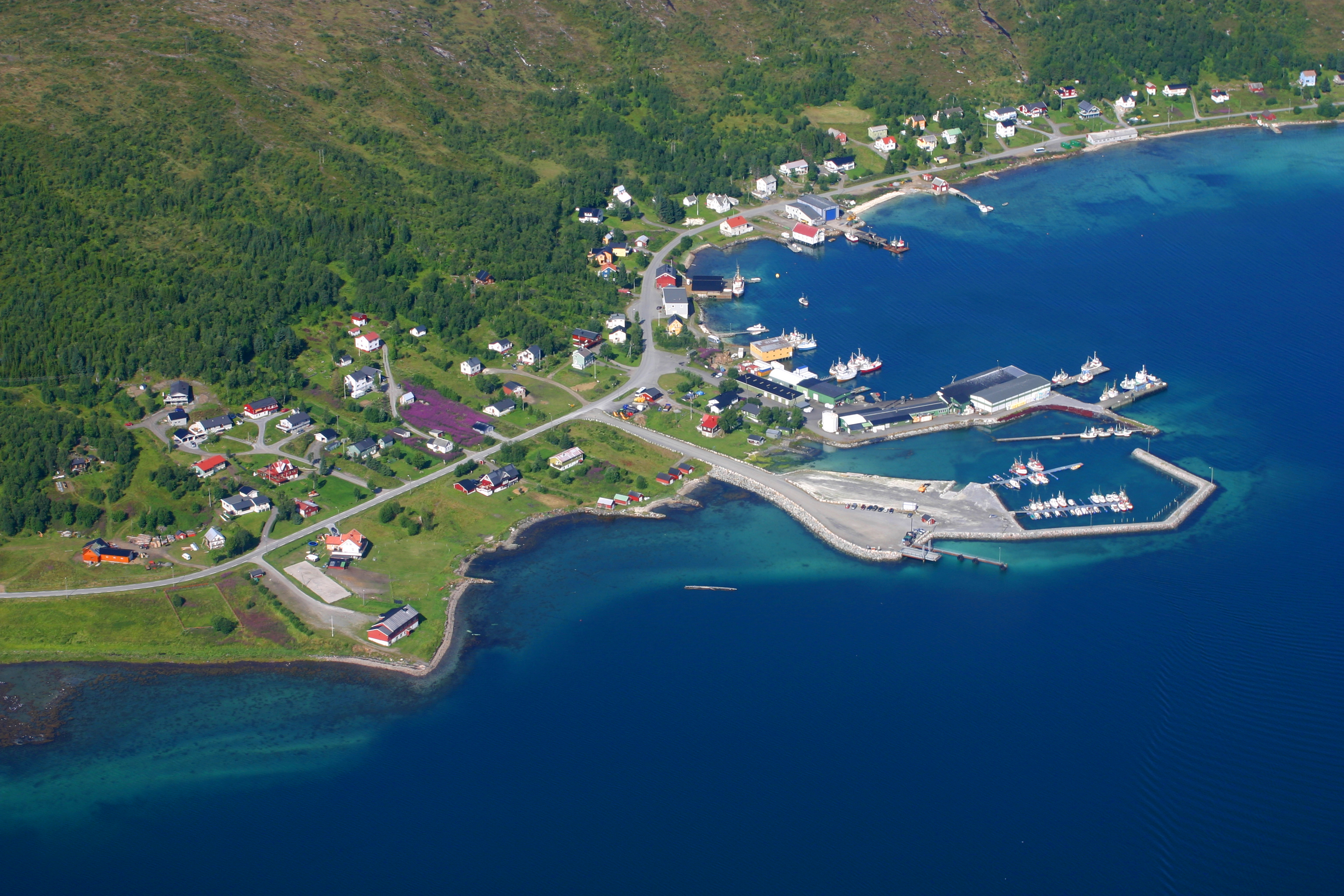
- View of the village
- Interactive map of Botnhamn
- Location within Troms Location within Norway
- Coordinates: 69°30′26″N 17°54′10″E
- Country: Norway
- Region: Northern Norway
- County: Troms
- District: Midt-Troms
- Municipality: Senja Municipality
- Elevation: 8 m (26 ft)
- Time zone: UTC+01:00 (CET)
  - Summer (DST): UTC+02:00 (CEST)
- Post Code: 9373 Botnhamn

Botnhamn is a village in Senja Municipality in Troms county, Norway. The small village is located more than 300 kilometres (190 mi) north of the Arctic Circle on the northern part of the large island of Senja. The village lies along the west side of the Stønnesbotn fjord. The population (2001) was 308. Botnhamn experiences warm summers and long, dark winters. Botnhamn is located about 28 kilometres (17 mi) northwest of the village of Gibostad and 52 kilometres (32 mi) northwest of the town of Finnsnes.

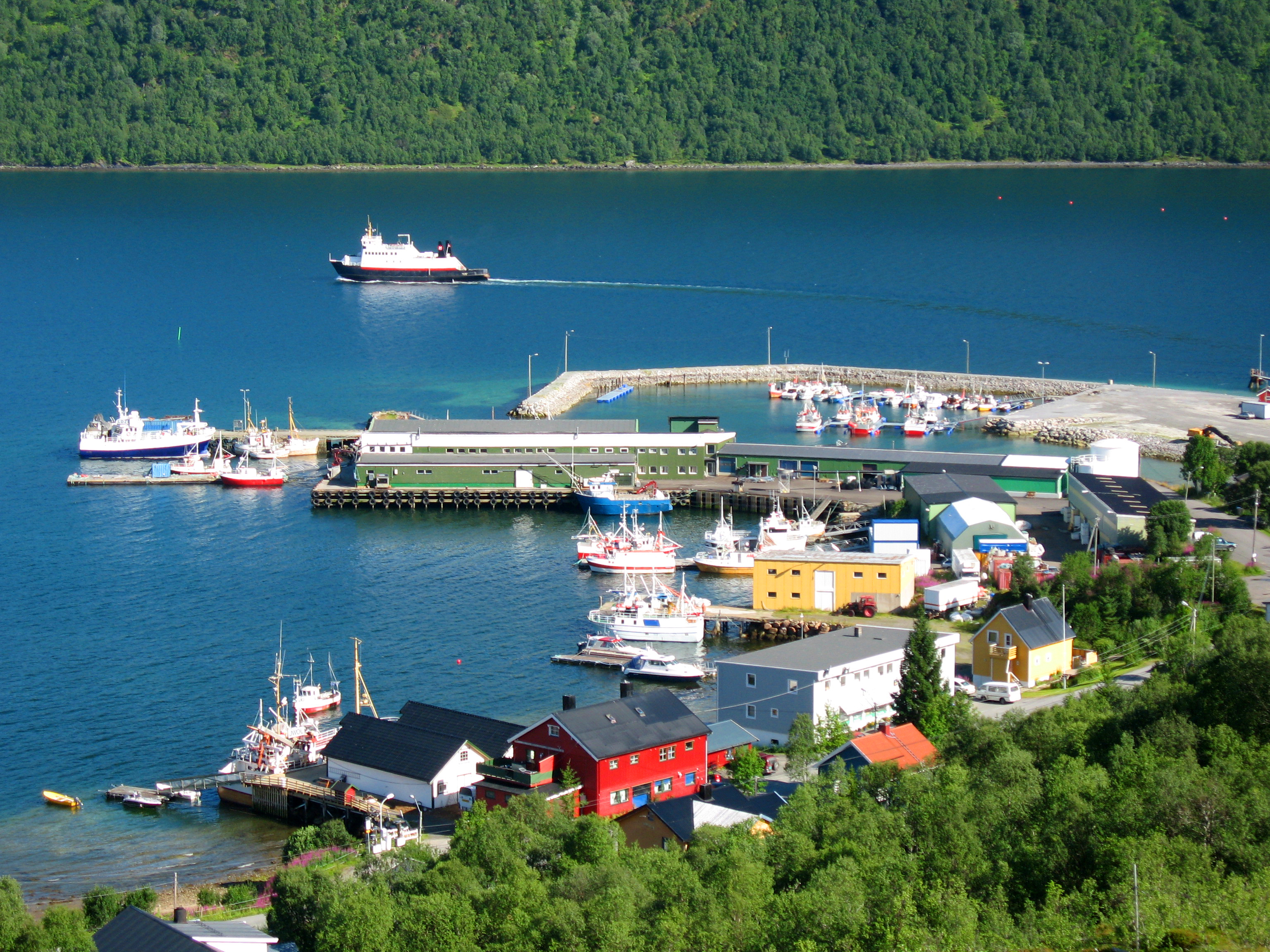
The ferry leaving Botnhamn

Botnhamn is an old farmyard mentioned in historical writings around 1370 under the name Stufunes. There are several archaeological discoveries from the Stone Age, Iron Age, and Middle Ages and the most known is The Silver Treasure of Botnhamn from approximately 1000 AD. The farmyard has probably been part of a chiefdom located on both sides of the outer Malangen fjord. In the 17th century, Botn was a bailiff estate in Balstad jurisdiction. Through the establishment of trading activity at the end of the 19th century, Botnhamn grew to become a center in Hillesøy Municipality.

Botnhamn is today a vigorous village with the ferry service Malangenforbindelsen connecting the island of Senja with the island of Kvaløya. It makes the journey between Senja and Tromsø shorter with a crossing time of 45 minutes and driving time of 50 minutes.
