= Husøy, Senja =

Village in Senja Municipality, Norway

Husøy Husøy i Senja
- Village
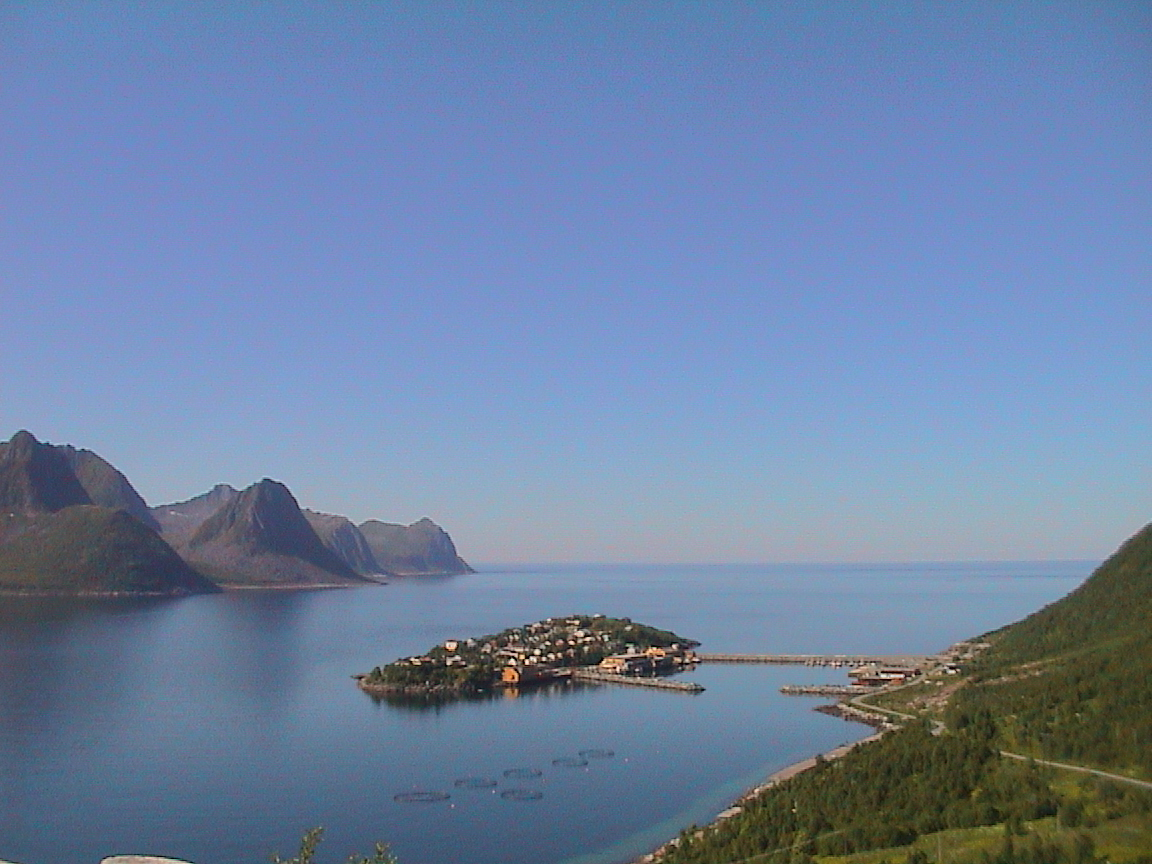
- View of the village
- Interactive map of Husøy
- Location within Troms Location within Norway
- Coordinates: 69°32′32″N 17°39′45″E
- Country: Norway
- Region: Northern Norway
- County: Troms
- District: Midt-Troms
- Municipality: Senja Municipality

Area
  - Total: 0.12 km^{2} (0.046 sq mi)
- Elevation: 21 m (69 ft)

Population (2023)
  - Total: 276
  - Density: 2,517/km^{2} (6,520/sq mi)
- Time zone: UTC+01:00 (CET)
  - Summer (DST): UTC+02:00 (CEST)
- Post Code: 9389 Husøy i Senja

Husøy is a village in Senja Municipality in Troms county, Norway. The village covers the entire island of Husøy which is located in the Øyfjorden off the northwest coast of the large island of Senja. The village/island is located about 53 kilometres (33 mi) southwest of the city of Tromsø. The village of Fjordgård sits about 4 kilometres (2.5 mi) across the fjord on the island of Senja.

The 0.12-square-kilometre (30-acre) village has a population (2023) of 276 and a population density of 2,517 inhabitants per square kilometre (6,520/sq mi). Up until recent times, the island was only accessible by boat; however, it is now connected to the island of Senja by a 300-metre-long (980 ft) causeway. The island has a grocery store, primary and secondary school, daycare, restaurant, and Husøy Chapel.
