= Langnes, Troms =

Village in Senja Municipality, Norway

Langnes
- Village
- Interactive map of Langnes
- Location within Troms Location within Norway
- Coordinates: 69°19′05″N 18°13′34″E
- Country: Norway
- Region: Northern Norway
- County: Troms
- District: Midt-Troms
- Municipality: Senja Municipality
- Elevation: 61 m (200 ft)
- Time zone: UTC+01:00 (CET)
  - Summer (DST): UTC+02:00 (CEST)
- Post Code: 9300 Finnsnes

Langnes is a village in Senja Municipality in Troms county, Norway. It is located along the lake Rossfjordsvatnet about 7 km (4.3 mi) south of the village of Rossfjordstraumen and about 14 km (8.7 mi) northeast of the town of Finnsnes. The village of Bjorelvnes lies about 7 kilometres (4.3 mi) west of Langnes. The population (2001) of the village is 189.
