= Fjordgård =

Village in Senja Municipality, Norway

Fjordgård Fjordgard
- Village
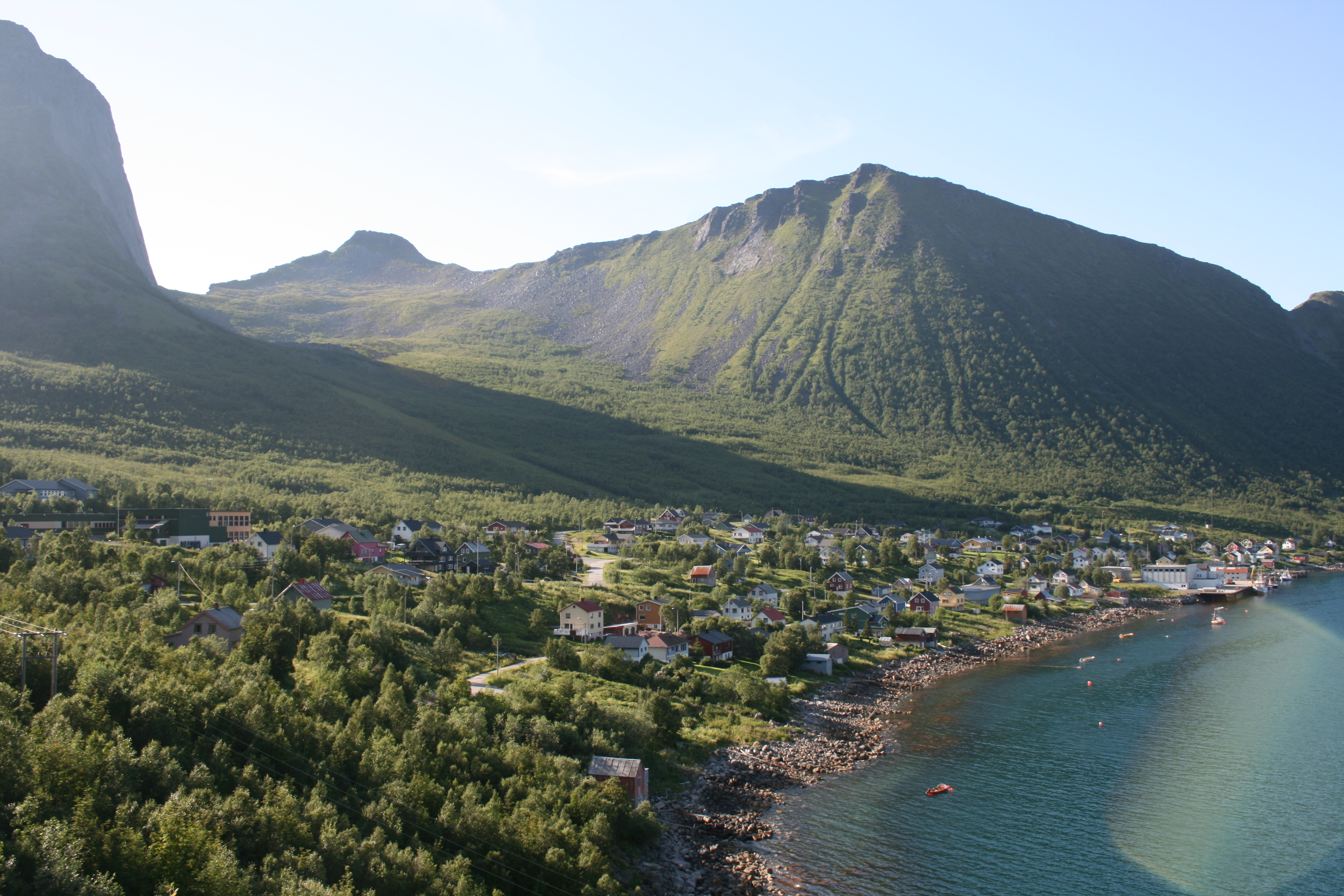
- View of the village
- Interactive map of Fjordgård
- Location within Troms Location within Norway
- Coordinates: 69°30′28″N 17°37′43″E
- Country: Norway
- Region: Northern Norway
- County: Troms
- District: Midt-Troms
- Municipality: Senja Municipality

Area
  - Total: 0.23 km^{2} (0.089 sq mi)
- Elevation: 9 m (30 ft)

Population (2007)
  - Total: 206
  - Density: 900/km^{2} (2,300/sq mi)
- Time zone: UTC+01:00 (CET)
  - Summer (DST): UTC+02:00 (CEST)
- Post Code: 9388 Fjordgård

Fjordgård or Fjordgard is a small fishing village in Senja Municipality in Troms county, Norway. It is located on the northern part of the island of Senja, the second largest island in Norway. Fjordgård lies on the west side of the fjord Ørnfjorden, which is an arm that branches off of the main Øyfjorden. The island village of Husøy lies about 4 kilometres (2.5 mi) across the fjord within sight of Fjordgård.

Fjordgård is surrounded by high and steep mountains and is connected to the rest of the island of Senja by a series of three road tunnels. Fjordgård Chapel is located in the village. The 0.23-square-kilometre (57-acre) village had a population (2007) of 206 and a population density of 896 inhabitants per square kilometre (2,320/sq mi). Since 2007, the population and area data for this village area has not been separately tracked by Statistics Norway.

== Cultural references ==
In Book 4 of Karl Ove Knausgård's internationally popular My Struggle novels, Karl Ove teaches at the local school in Fjordgård. The village is referred to in the book by the pseudonym "Håfjord."
