= Fjordgård Chapel =

- Fjordgård kapell
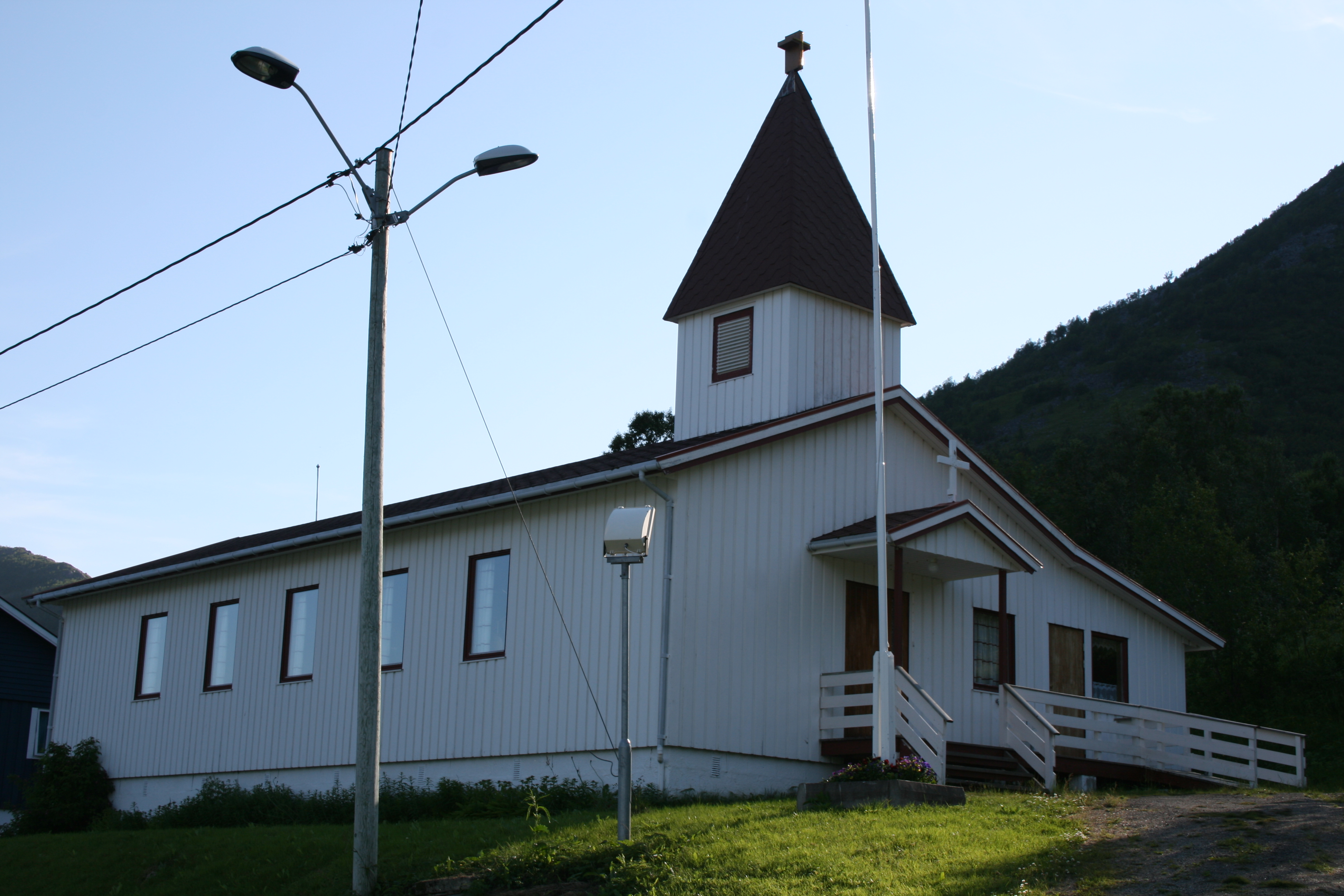
- View of the chapel
- Fjordgård Chapel
- 69.5105566°N 17.6246484°E
- Location: Senja Municipality, Troms
- Country: Norway
- Denomination: Church of Norway
- Churchmanship: Evangelical Lutheran

History
- Status: Chapel

Architecture
- Functional status: Active
- Architect: Rik. Bjørn A/S
- Architectural type: Long church
- Completed: 1976 (50 years ago)

Specifications
- Capacity: 110
- Materials: Wood

Administration
- Diocese: Nord-Hålogaland
- Deanery: Senja prosti
- Parish: Lenvik

Fjordgård Chapel (Norwegian: Fjordgård kapell) is a chapel of the Church of Norway in Senja Municipality in Troms county, Norway. It is located in the village of Fjordgård on the northern part of the island of Senja. It is an annex chapel for the Lenvik parish which is part of the Senja prosti (deanery) in the Diocese of Nord-Hålogaland. The white, wooden church was built in a long church style in 1976 using plans drawn up by the architectural firm Rik. Bjørn A/S. The church seats about 110 people.

== See also ==
- List of churches in Nord-Hålogaland
