= Bjorelvnes =

Village in Senja Municipality, Norway

Bjorelvnes: Bjorelvnes (Norwegian); Bornjárga (Northern Sami)
- Village
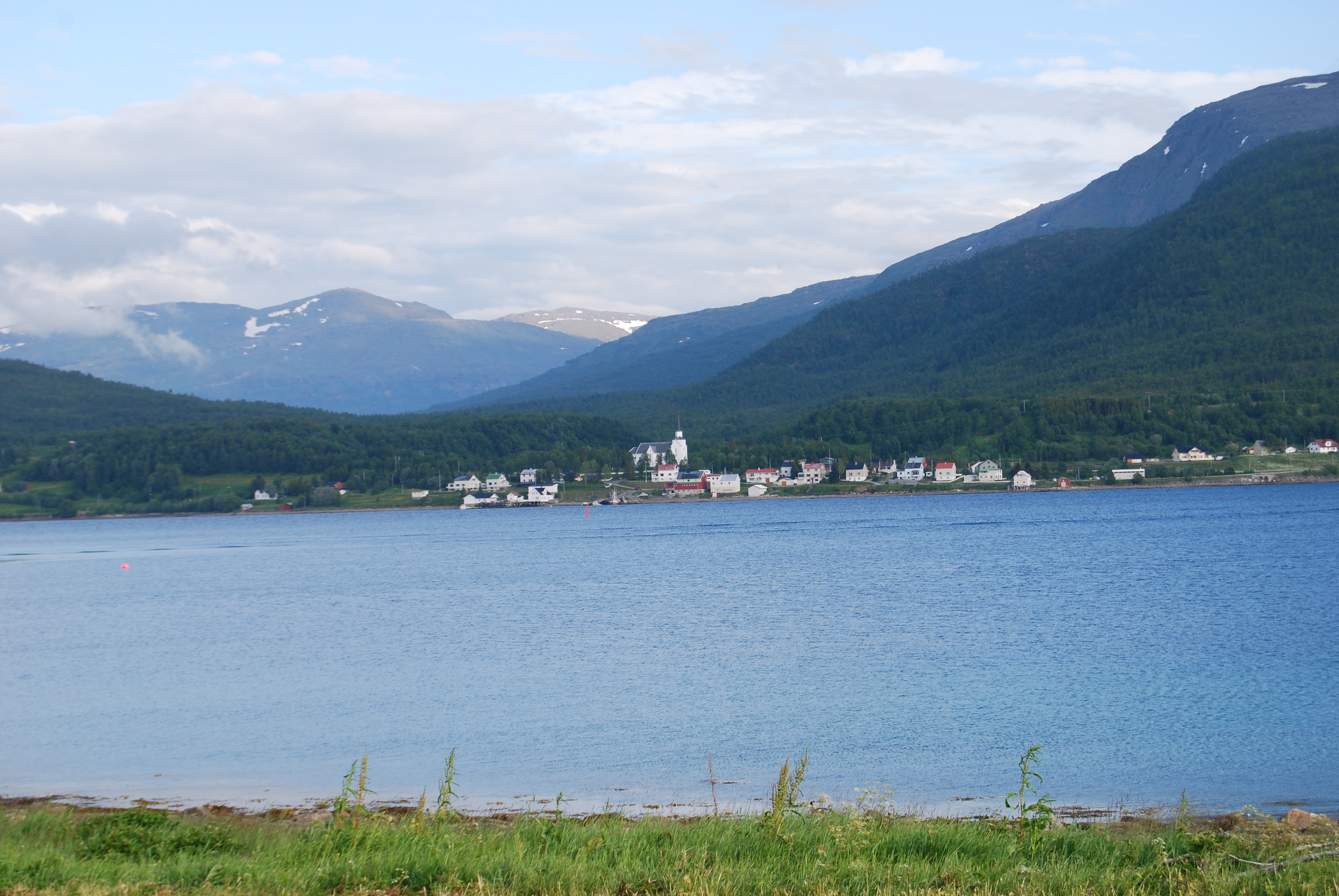
- View of the village with Lenvik Church
- Interactive map of Bjorelvnes
- Location within Troms Location within Norway
- Coordinates: 69°20′29″N 18°05′16″E
- Country: Norway
- Region: Northern Norway
- County: Troms
- District: Midt-Troms
- Municipality: Senja Municipality
- Elevation: 3 m (9.8 ft)
- Time zone: UTC+01:00 (CET)
  - Summer (DST): UTC+02:00 (CEST)
- Post Code: 9300 Finnsnes

Bjorelvnes (Norwegian) or Bornjárga (Northern Sami) is a village in Senja Municipality in Troms county, Norway. The village is located about 14 kilometres (8.7 mi) north of the town of Finnsnes, along the Gisundet strait, directly across the strait from the village of Gibostad. The village of Langnes lies about 6 kilometres (3.7 mi) east of Bjorelvnes. Lenvik Church is located in Bjorelvnes.
