= Husøy Chapel =

- Husøy kapell
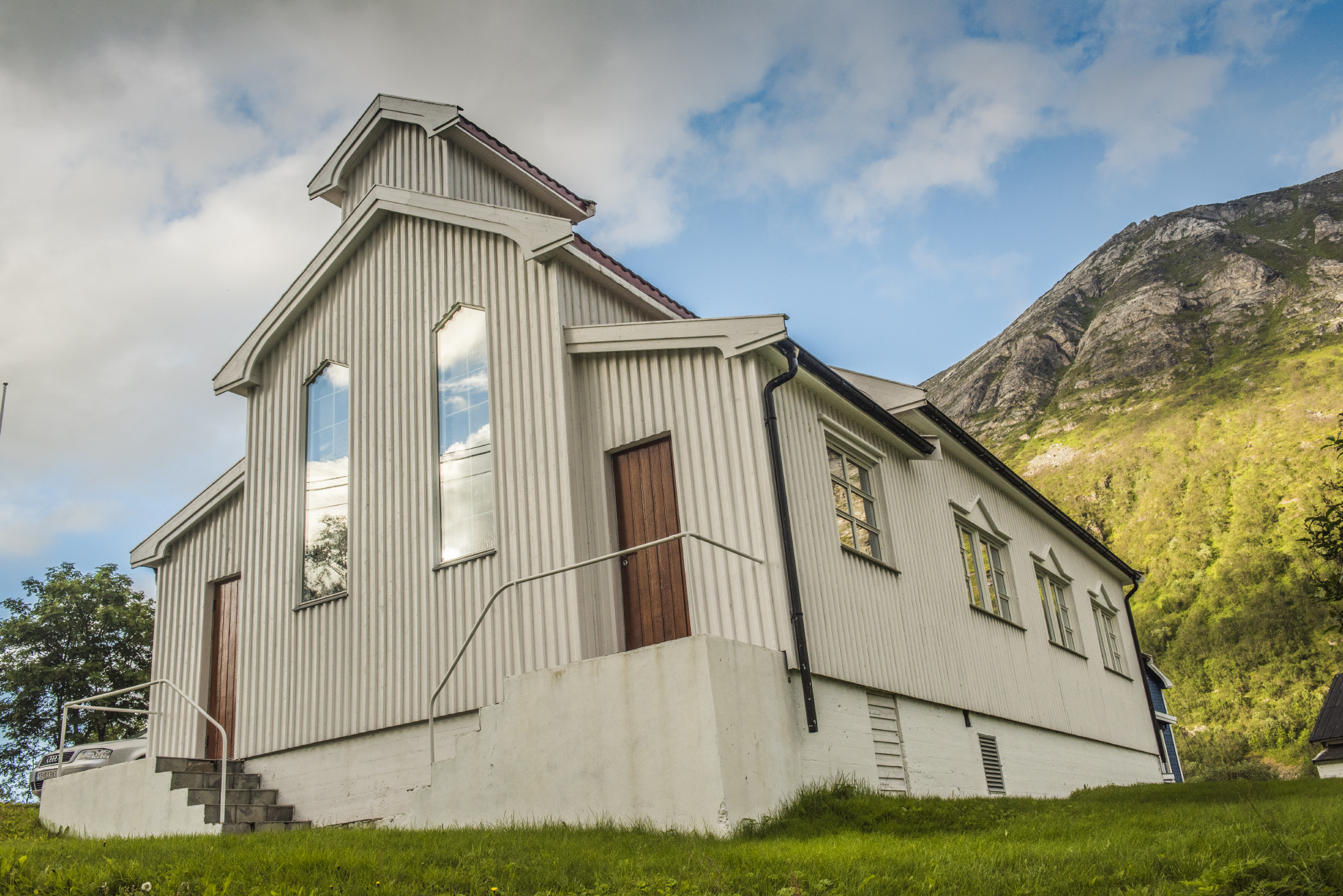
- View of the chapel
- Husøy Chapel
- 69.5423°N 17.6626°E
- Location: Senja Municipality, Troms
- Country: Norway
- Denomination: Church of Norway
- Churchmanship: Evangelical Lutheran

History
- Status: Parish church

Architecture
- Functional status: Active
- Architectural type: Long church
- Completed: 1957 (69 years ago)

Specifications
- Capacity: 100
- Materials: Brick

Administration
- Diocese: Nord-Hålogaland
- Deanery: Senja prosti
- Parish: Lenvik
- Norwegian Cultural Heritage Site
- Type: Church
- Status: Not protected
- ID: 84674

Husøy Chapel (Norwegian: Husøy kapell) is a chapel of the Church of Norway in Senja Municipality in Troms county, Norway. It is located on the island-village of Husøy, just off the coast of the island of Senja. It is an annex chapel for the Lenvik parish which is part of the Senja prosti (deanery) in the Diocese of Nord-Hålogaland. The white, wood and brick chapel was built in a long church style in 1957. The chapel seats about 100 people.

== See also ==
- List of churches in Nord-Hålogaland
