= Malangen Church =

- Malangen kirke
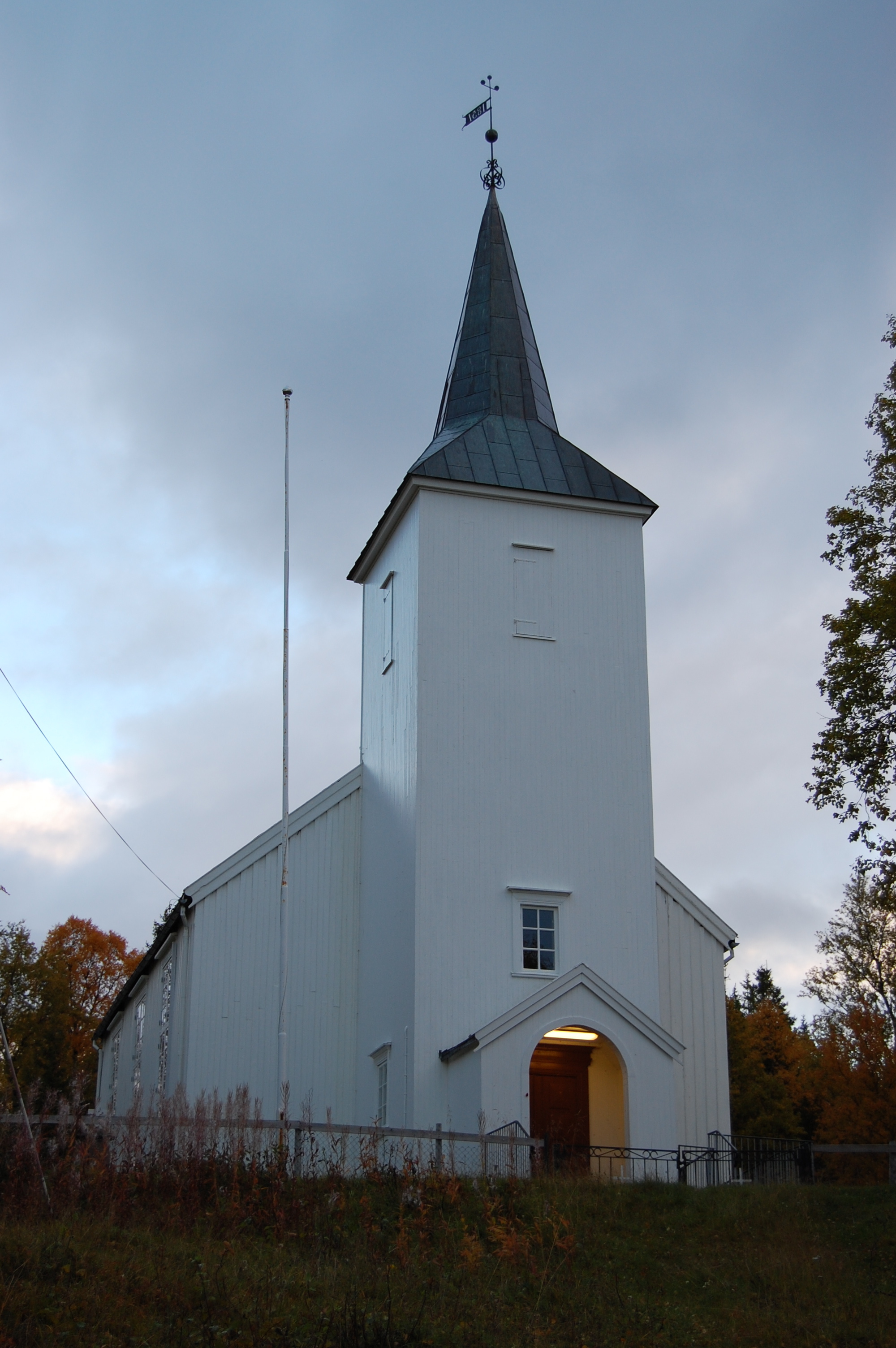
- View of the church
- Malangen Church
- 69.400004°N 18.598161°E
- Location: Balsfjord Municipality, Troms
- Country: Norway
- Denomination: Church of Norway
- Churchmanship: Evangelical Lutheran

History
- Status: Parish church
- Founded: 1853
- Consecrated: 31 August 1853

Architecture
- Functional status: Active
- Architectural type: Long church
- Completed: 1853 (173 years ago)

Specifications
- Capacity: 280
- Materials: Wood

Administration
- Diocese: Nord-Hålogaland
- Deanery: Senja prosti
- Parish: Malangen
- Norwegian Cultural Heritage Site
- Type: Church
- Status: Listed
- ID: 84377

Malangen Church (Norwegian: Malangen kirke) is a parish church of the Church of Norway in Balsfjord Municipality in Troms county, Norway. It is located in the village of Mortenhals. It is the church for the Malangen parish which is part of the Senja prosti (deanery) in the Diocese of Nord-Hålogaland. The white, wooden church was built in a long church style in 1853 by local builders. The church seats about 280 people. The building was consecrated on 31 August 1853.

== See also ==
- List of churches in Nord-Hålogaland
