= Lysvatnet (Meløy) =

Lake in Meløy, Norway

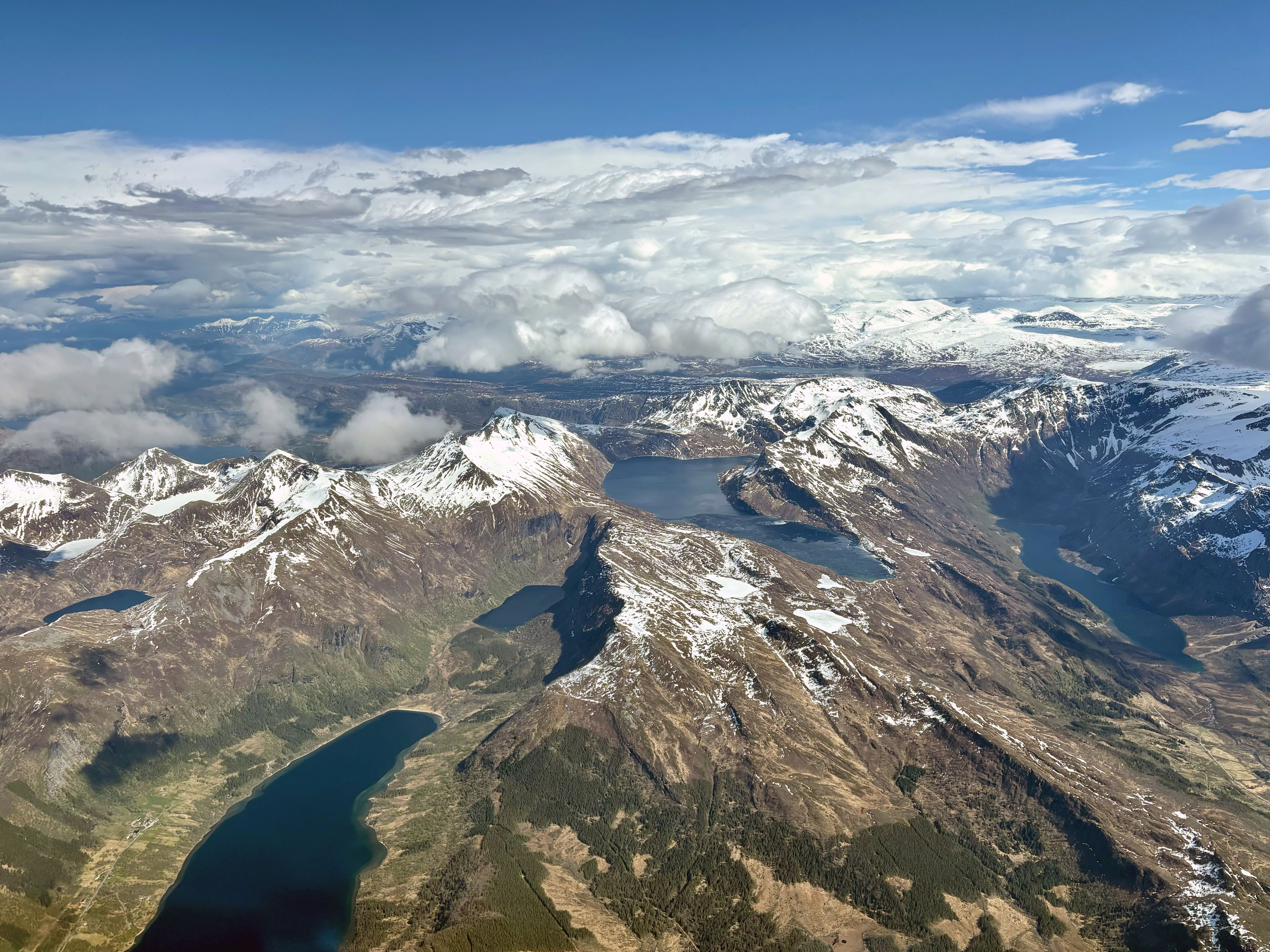
- Aerial view of lakes in Nordland: Lysvatnet (center), Markavatnet & Spilderdalsvatnet
- Interactive map of the lake
- Location: Meløy Municipality, Nordland
- Coordinates: 66.9037°N 13.8920°E
- Basin countries: Norway
- Max. length: 5 kilometres (3.1 mi)
- Max. width: 2 kilometres (1.2 mi)
- Surface area: 4.53 km^{2} (1.75 sq mi)
- Shore length^{1}: 13.7 kilometres (8.5 mi)
- Surface elevation: 353 metres (1,158 ft)
- References: NVE
- ^{1} Shore length is not a well-defined measure.

Lysvatnet is a lake that lies in Meløy Municipality in Nordland county, Norway. The 4.53-square-kilometre (1.75 sq mi) is located near the border with Gildeskål Municipality, about 5.5 kilometres (3.4 mi) east of the municipal centre of Ørnes. The lake Markvatnet lies about 3 kilometres (1.9 mi) to the west of this lake.

== See also ==
- List of lakes in Norway
