= Lysvatnet (Troms) =

Lake in Senja, Norway

Lysvatnet (Norwegian) Čáhppesjávri (Northern Sami)
- Interactive map of the lake
- Location: Troms
- Coordinates: 69.3788°N 17.8116°E
- Primary outflows: Lyselva
- Basin countries: Norway
- Max. length: 6 kilometres (3.7 mi)
- Max. width: 800 metres (2,600 ft)
- Surface area: 3.67 km^{2} (1.42 sq mi)
- Shore length^{1}: 16.34 kilometres (10.15 mi)
- Surface elevation: 22 metres (72 ft)
- References: NVE
- ^{1} Shore length is not a well-defined measure.

Lysvatnet (Norwegian) or Čáhppesjávri (Northern Sami) is a lake in Senja Municipality in Troms county, Norway. The lake lies in the Helvetesdalen valley on the island of Senja. The 6-kilometre (3.7 mi) long lake covers an area of 3.67 square kilometres (1.42 sq mi). The lake lies about 10 kilometres (6.2 mi) west of the village of Gibostad.

== See also ==
- List of lakes in Norway
