= Rossfjordstraumen =

Village in Senja Municipality, Norway

Rossfjordstraumen (Norwegian); Duvtarávdnji (Northern Sami)
- Village
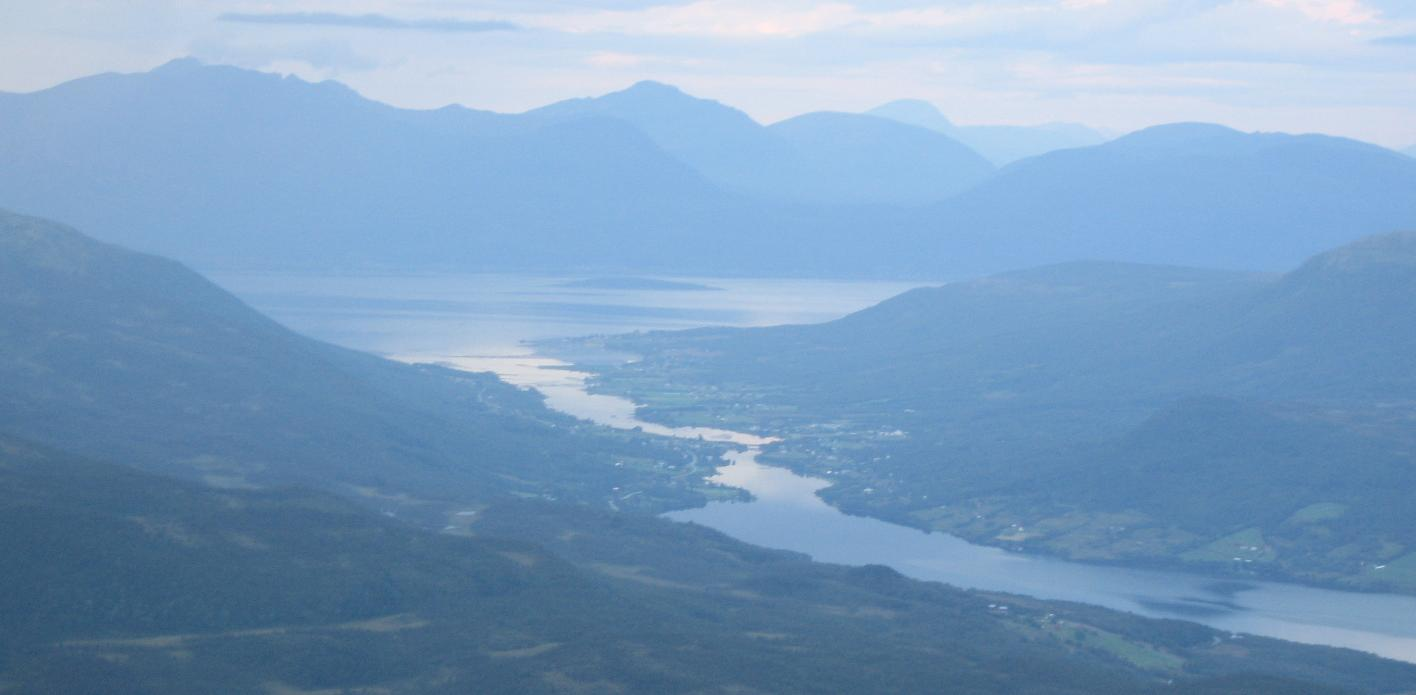
- View of the village
- Interactive map of: Rossfjordstraumen (Norwegian); Duvtarávdnji (Northern Sami)
- Location within Troms Location within Norway
- Coordinates: 69°21′47″N 18°18′49″E
- Country: Norway
- Region: Northern Norway
- County: Troms
- District: Midt-Troms
- Municipality: Senja Municipality
- Elevation: 0.5 m (1.6 ft)
- Time zone: UTC+01:00 (CET)
  - Summer (DST): UTC+02:00 (CEST)
- Post Code: 9302 Rossfjordstraumen

Rossfjordstraumen (Norwegian) or Duvtarávdnji (Northern Sami) is a village in Senja Municipality in Troms county, Norway. It serves as a community center for the areas around the Rossfjorden and the lake Rossfjordvatnet. It is located about 20 kilometres (12 mi) northeast of the town of Finnsnes, and about 7 km (4.3 mi) northeast of the village of Langnes. In 2009, the village area had 428 residents. Rossfjord Church is located in this village.

== History ==
On 28 March 1968, a Widerøe de Havilland Canada DHC-3 Otter seaplane crashed at Rossfjordstraumen. There were no fatalities, but the aircraft was written off.
