= Berg Municipality (Troms) =

Former municipality in Troms, Norway

Berg Municipality Berg kommune Birgi suohkan (Northern Sami)
- Former municipality
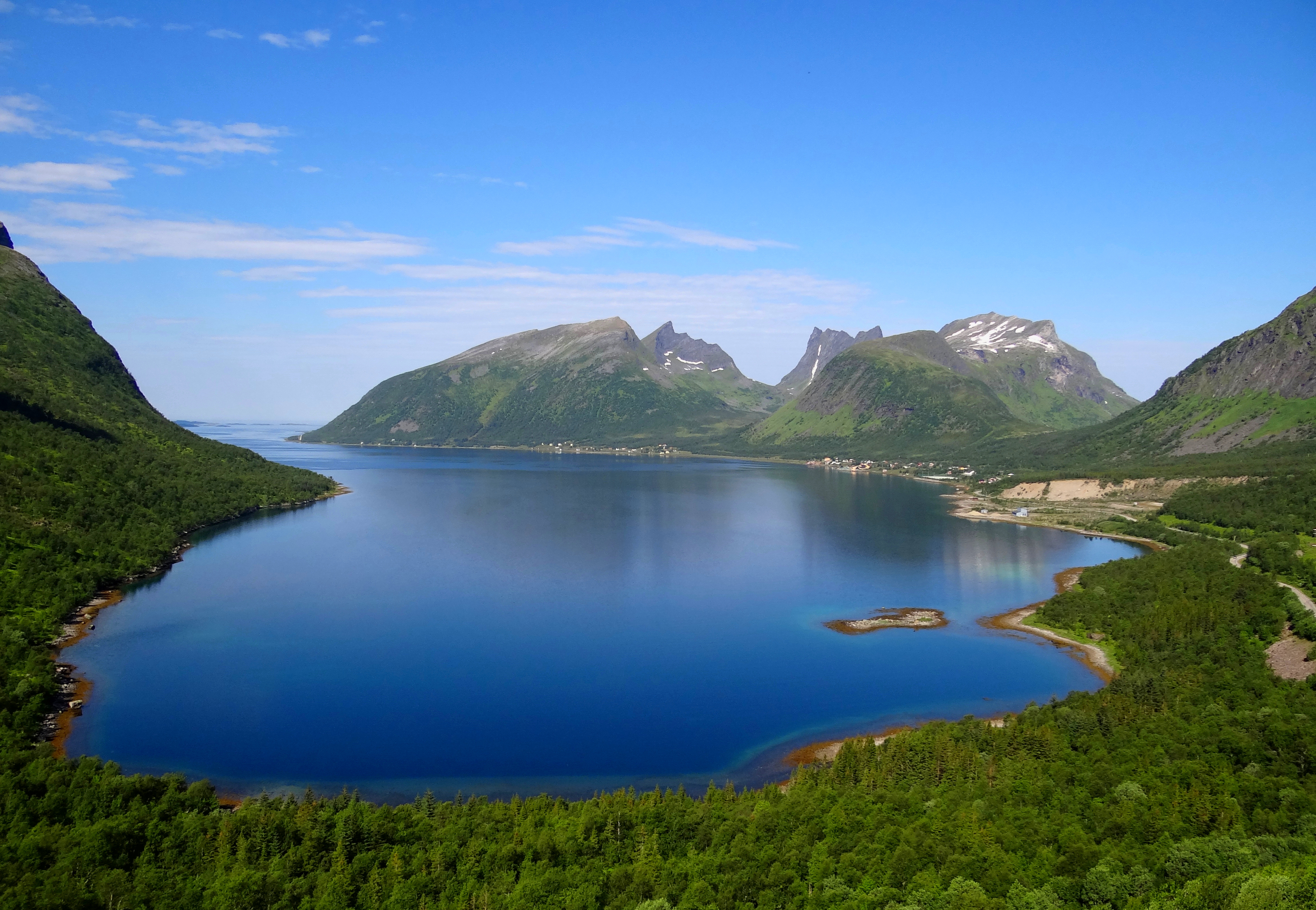

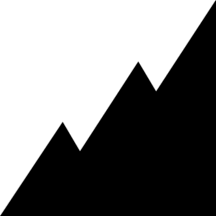
- Flag Coat of arms

- Troms within Norway

- Berg within Troms
- Coordinates: 69°28′00″N 17°23′52″E
- Country: Norway
- County: Troms
- District: Midt-Troms
- Established: 1 Jan 1838
  - Created as: Formannskapsdistrikt
- Disestablished: 1 Jan 2020
  - Succeeded by: Senja Municipality
- Administrative centre: Skaland

Government
  - Mayor (2015-2019): Roar Jakobsen (LL)

Area (upon dissolution)
  - Total: 293.90 km^{2} (113.48 sq mi)
  - Land: 276.35 km^{2} (106.70 sq mi)
  - Water: 17.55 km^{2} (6.78 sq mi) 6%
  - Rank: #281 in Norway
- Highest elevation: 1,001 m (3,284 ft)

Population (2019)
  - Total: 888
  - Rank: #406 in Norway
  - Density: 3/km^{2} (7.8/sq mi)
  - Change (10 years): ▼ −5.7%
- Demonym: Bergsværing

Official language
  - Norwegian form: Bokmål
- Time zone: UTC+01:00 (CET)
  - Summer (DST): UTC+02:00 (CEST)
- ISO 3166 code: NO-1929

Berg is a former municipality in Troms county, Norway. The municipality existed from 1838 until its dissolution in 2020 when it was merged into the new Senja Municipality. The administrative centre of the municipality was the village of Skaland. Other villages included Finnsæter, Mefjordvær, and Senjahopen. The municipality was located on the western part of the large island of Senja.

Prior to its dissolution in 2020, the 294-square-kilometre (114 sq mi) municipality was the 281st largest by area out of the 422 municipalities in Norway. Berg Municipality was also the 406th most populous municipality in Norway with a population of 888. The municipality's population density was 3 inhabitants per square kilometre (7.8/sq mi) and its population has decreased by 5.7% over the previous decade.

The municipality was the first place in the world to utilize a hydroelectrical power station in the mining community of Hamn. When the mining industry ceased, the "electrical adventure" did as well. The buildings are still located at Hamn, now functioning as a special hotel/lodge.

The first female pastor in the Lutheran Church of Norway, Ingrid Bjerkås, worked in this parish, starting in 1961.

== General information ==
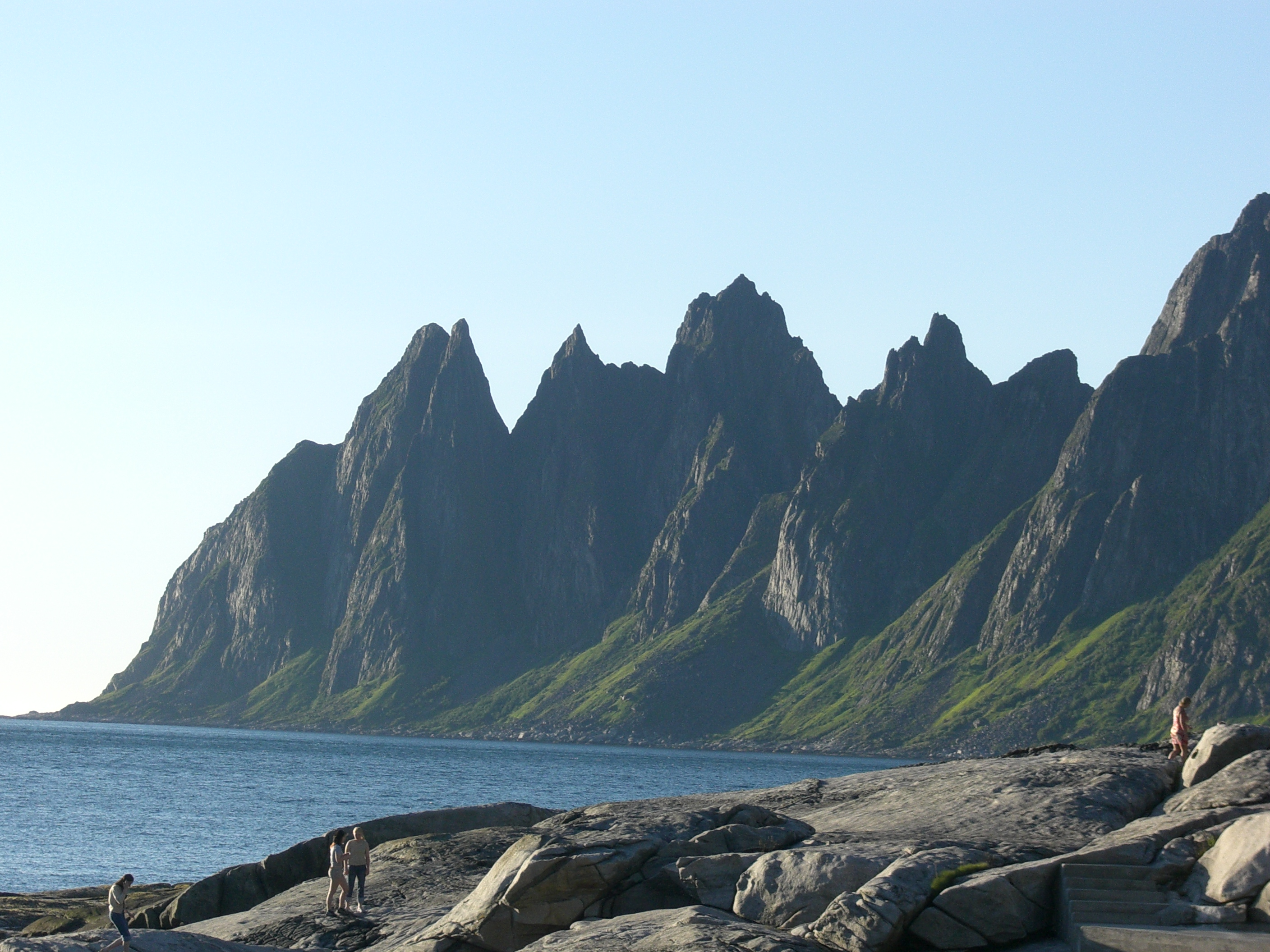
View of the Ersfjorden

The parish of Berg was established as a municipality on 1 January 1838 (see formannskapsdistrikt law). On 1 January 1902, the southern part of Berg (population: 1,229) was separated to form the new Torsken Municipality. This left Berg with 1,002 residents. The municipal borders did not change after that time.

In March 2017, the Parliament of Norway voted to merge Berg Municipality, Torsken Municipality, Lenvik Municipality, and Tranøy Municipality. The new municipality would encompass the whole island of Senja plus part of the mainland. The new Senja Municipality was established on 1 January 2020.

=== Name ===
The municipality (originally the parish) is named after the old Berg farm (Old Norse: Berg) in what is now the village of Skaland. The farm is where Berg Church is located. The name is the same as the word berg which means "mountain".

=== Coat of arms ===
The coat of arms was granted on 2 October 1987. The official blazon is "Per bend sinister double bevilled argent and sable" (Norwegian: Venstre skrådelt av sølv og svart ved dobbelt lynsnitt). This means the arms have a double bevilled division of the field running along a diagonal path (bend sinister). The field (background) below the line has a tincture of sable. The field above the line has a tincture of argent which means it is commonly colored white, but if it is made out of metal, then silver is used. The arms are canting since "berg" means "mountain" in Norwegian and the arms show the profile of the three mountains of Trælen, Oksen, and Kjølva. The colors represent "winter darkness", "black sea", and "toward brighter times." The arms were designed by Rolf Tidemann.

=== Churches ===
The Church of Norway had one parish (sokn) within Berg Municipality. It was part of the Senja prosti (deanery) in the Diocese of Nord-Hålogaland.

Churches in Berg Municipality
Parish (sokn)	Church name	Location of the church	Year built
Berg	Berg Church	Skaland	1955
Berg	Finnsæter Chapel	Finnsæter	1982
Berg	Mefjordvær Chapel	Mefjordvær	1916

== Geography ==
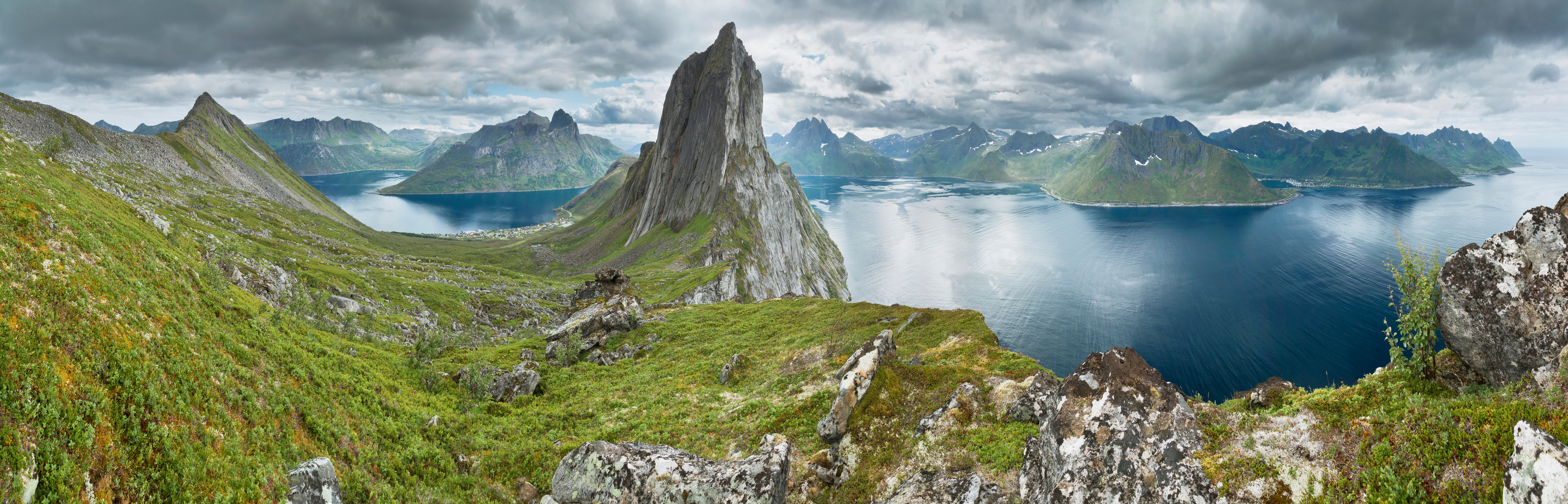
View towards Melfjorden (to the right) and Øyfjorden (to the left). The 640-metre (2,100 ft) tall mountain Segla is in the middle of the photo. Fjordgård village lies far down to the left. Credit: Simo Räsänen

The municipality faced the Atlantic Ocean on the west side of the large island of Senja. The largest urban area in Berg was the village of Senjahopen. The highest point in the municipality (and on the whole island of Senja) was the 1,001-metre (3,284 ft) tall mountain Breidtinden. There were three large fjords that cut into the municipality: Bergsfjorden, Ersfjorden, and Mefjorden.

=== Climate ===
Climate data for Skaland, Berg
Month	Jan	Feb	Mar	Apr	May	Jun	Jul	Aug	Sep	Oct	Nov	Dec	Year
Daily mean °C (°F)	−2.5 (27.5)	−2.5 (27.5)	−1.4 (29.5)	1.2 (34.2)	5.3 (41.5)	8.8 (47.8)	11.3 (52.3)	11.1 (52.0)	7.8 (46.0)	4.1 (39.4)	0.6 (33.1)	−1.6 (29.1)	3.5 (38.3)
Average precipitation mm (inches)	109 (4.3)	94 (3.7)	88 (3.5)	77 (3.0)	55 (2.2)	67 (2.6)	77 (3.0)	91 (3.6)	115 (4.5)	152 (6.0)	129 (5.1)	131 (5.2)	1,185 (46.7)
Source: Norwegian Meteorological Institute

== Government ==
While it existed, Berg Municipality was responsible for primary education (through 10th grade), outpatient health services, senior citizen services, welfare and other social services, zoning, economic development, and municipal roads and utilities. The municipality was governed by a municipal council of directly elected representatives. The mayor was indirectly elected by a vote of the municipal council. The municipality was under the jurisdiction of the Senja District Court and the Hålogaland Court of Appeal.

=== Municipal council ===
The municipal council (Kommunestyre) of Berg Municipality was made up of 15 representatives that were elected to four year terms. The tables below show the historical composition of the council by political party.

Berg kommunestyre 2015–2019
Party name (in Norwegian)	Number of representatives
Labour Party (Arbeiderpartiet)	6
Progress Party (Fremskrittspartiet)	1
Berg Common List (Berg samlingsliste)	6
Berg Common List (Berg Fellesliste)	2
Total number of members:	15
Note: On 1 January 2020, Berg Municipality became part of Senja Municipality.

Berg kommunestyre 2011–2015
Party name (in Norwegian)	Number of representatives
Labour Party (Arbeiderpartiet)	6
Progress Party (Fremskrittspartiet)	1
Berg Common List (Berg samlingsliste)	5
Berg Common List (Berg Fellesliste)	3
Total number of members:	15

Berg kommunestyre 2007–2011
Party name (in Norwegian)	Number of representatives
Labour Party (Arbeiderpartiet)	6
Progress Party (Fremskrittspartiet)	1
Conservative Party (Høyre)	1
Joint list of the Centre Party and a Cross-Party List (Senterpartiet og Tverrpolitisk liste)	5
Berg common list (Berg fellesliste)	2
Total number of members:	15

Berg kommunestyre 2003–2007
Party name (in Norwegian)	Number of representatives
Labour Party (Arbeiderpartiet)	7
Progress Party (Fremskrittspartiet)	1
Northern Berg common list (Nordre-Berg Fellesliste)	7
Cross-party list (Tverrpolitisk liste)	2
Total number of members:	17

Berg kommunestyre 1999–2003
Party name (in Norwegian)	Number of representatives
Labour Party (Arbeiderpartiet)	8
Cross-party list (Tverrpolitisk liste)	4
Mefjorden local list (Mefjorden bygdeliste)	3
Senjahopen new local list (Senjahopen nye bygdeliste)	2
Total number of members:	17

Berg kommunestyre 1995–1999
Party name (in Norwegian)	Number of representatives
Labour Party (Arbeiderpartiet)	7
Cross-party list (Tverrpolitisk liste)	4
Senjahopen local list (Senjahopen Bygdeliste)	5
People's list in Southern Berg (Folkelista/Folkevalgte i Sondre Berg)	1
Total number of members:	17

Berg kommunestyre 1991–1995
Party name (in Norwegian)	Number of representatives
Labour Party (Arbeiderpartiet)	7
Christian Democratic Party (Kristelig Folkeparti)	1
Socialist Left Party (Sosialistisk Venstreparti)	2
Cross-party list (Tverrpolitisk liste)	3
Senjahopen local list (Senjahopen Bygdeliste)	4
Total number of members:	17

Berg kommunestyre 1987–1991
Party name (in Norwegian)	Number of representatives
Labour Party (Arbeiderpartiet)	11
Conservative Party (Høyre)	1
Christian Democratic Party (Kristelig Folkeparti)	1
District list for Northern Berg (Distriktsliste for Nordre Berg)	1
Senjahopen local list (Senjahopen Bygdeliste)	2
Berg independent socialists common list (Berg uavhengige sosialisters fellesliste)	1
Total number of members:	17

Berg kommunestyre 1983–1987
Party name (in Norwegian)	Number of representatives
Labour Party (Arbeiderpartiet)	11
Conservative Party (Høyre)	2
Christian Democratic Party (Kristelig Folkeparti)	1
District list for Northern Berg (Distriktsliste for Nordre Berg)	2
Berg independent socialists common list (Berg uavhengige sosialisters fellesliste)	1
Total number of members:	17

Berg kommunestyre 1979–1983
Party name (in Norwegian)	Number of representatives
Labour Party (Arbeiderpartiet)	7
Conservative Party (Høyre)	2
Christian Democratic Party (Kristelig Folkeparti)	2
District list for Mefjordvær (Distriktsliste for Mefjordvær)	2
Senjahopen local list (Senjahopen bygdelist)	3
Independent socialist common list (Uavhengig sosialistisk fellesliste)	1
Total number of members:	17

Berg kommunestyre 1975–1979
Party name (in Norwegian)	Number of representatives
Labour Party (Arbeiderpartiet)	8
District list for Berg (Distriktsliste for Berg)	3
District list for Mefjordvær (Distriktsliste for Mefjordvær)	2
Local list for Senjehopen (Bygdeliste for Senjehopen)	4
Total number of members:	17

Berg kommunestyre 1971–1975
Party name (in Norwegian)	Number of representatives
Labour Party (Arbeiderpartiet)	8
Local List(s) (Lokale lister)	9
Total number of members:	17

Berg kommunestyre 1967–1971
Party name (in Norwegian)	Number of representatives
Labour Party (Arbeiderpartiet)	12
Local List(s) (Lokale lister)	5
Total number of members:	17

Berg kommunestyre 1963–1967
Party name (in Norwegian)	Number of representatives
Labour Party (Arbeiderpartiet)	10
Local List(s) (Lokale lister)	7
Total number of members:	17

Berg herredsstyre 1959–1963
Party name (in Norwegian)	Number of representatives
Labour Party (Arbeiderpartiet)	7
Local List(s) (Lokale lister)	6
Total number of members:	13

Berg herredsstyre 1955–1959
Party name (in Norwegian)	Number of representatives
Labour Party (Arbeiderpartiet)	9
Local List(s) (Lokale lister)	4
Total number of members:	13

Berg herredsstyre 1951–1955
Party name (in Norwegian)	Number of representatives
Labour Party (Arbeiderpartiet)	8
Liberal Party (Venstre)	3
Local List(s) (Lokale lister)	1
Total number of members:	12

Berg herredsstyre 1947–1951
Party name (in Norwegian)	Number of representatives
Local List(s) (Lokale lister)	12
Total number of members:	12

Berg herredsstyre 1945–1947
Party name (in Norwegian)	Number of representatives
Local List(s) (Lokale lister)	12
Total number of members:	12

Berg herredsstyre 1937–1941*
Party name (in Norwegian)	Number of representatives
Labour Party (Arbeiderpartiet)	7
Local List(s) (Lokale lister)	5
Total number of members:	12
Note: Due to the German occupation of Norway during World War II, no elections were held for new municipal councils until after the war ended in 1945.

=== Mayors ===
The mayor (Norwegian: ordfører) of Berg Municipality was the political leader of the municipality and the chairperson of the municipal council. Here is a list of people who have held this position:

- 1838–1839: Rev. Jens Jæger
- 1839–1844: Johan Christian Heitmann
- 1845–1846: Johan Andersen Ersfjord
- 1847–1848: Rev. Ingvard Berner
- 1849–1850: Søren Heitmann Skaland
- 1851–1854: Rev. Bernt Fredrik Hansen
- 1855–1856: Johan Severin Brox
- 1857–1858: Eilert Brox
- 1859–1862: Rev. Kristian August Hansen
- 1863–1866: Samuel Olai Andersen
- 1867–1868: Rev. Carl Fredrik Holmboe
- 1869–1874: Hans Christian Bergersen
- 1875–1876: Rev. Wilhelm Christian Magelsen
- 1877–1886: Daniel Heitmann
- 1887–1901: Adolf Lund
- 1902–1907: Rev. Kristian Fredriksen Finborud
- 1908–1910: Danchart Brochs
- 1911–1913: Ole Edvard Olsen
- 1914–1916: Danchart Brochs
- 1917–1922: Rudolf Brox
- 1923–1925: Jørgen Pedersen
- 1926–1928: Peder Fredriksen
- 1929–1931: Jørgen Pedersen
- 1932–1934: Håkon Andreassen
- 1935–1941: Jørgen Pedersen
- 1941–1943: Magne Skogland
- 1943–1945: Rev. Jens Martin Berling
- 1946–1951: Johannes Schanke (V)
- 1951–1959: Eivind Kristian Midtgård (Ap)
- 1959–1963: Hans Heitmann (Ap)
- 1963–1975: Inge Mikalsen (Ap)
- 1975–1979: Nils Heiberg (LL)
- 1979–1995: Roald Johan Nymo (Ap)
- 1995–2007: Trond Abelsen (Ap)
- 2007–2011: Jan Harald Jansen (Ap)
- 2011–2015: Guttorm Nergård (V)
- 2015–2019: Roar Jakobsen (LL)

== See also ==
- List of former municipalities of Norway
