= Hugo Munthe-Kaas =

Hugo Conrad Munthe-Kaas
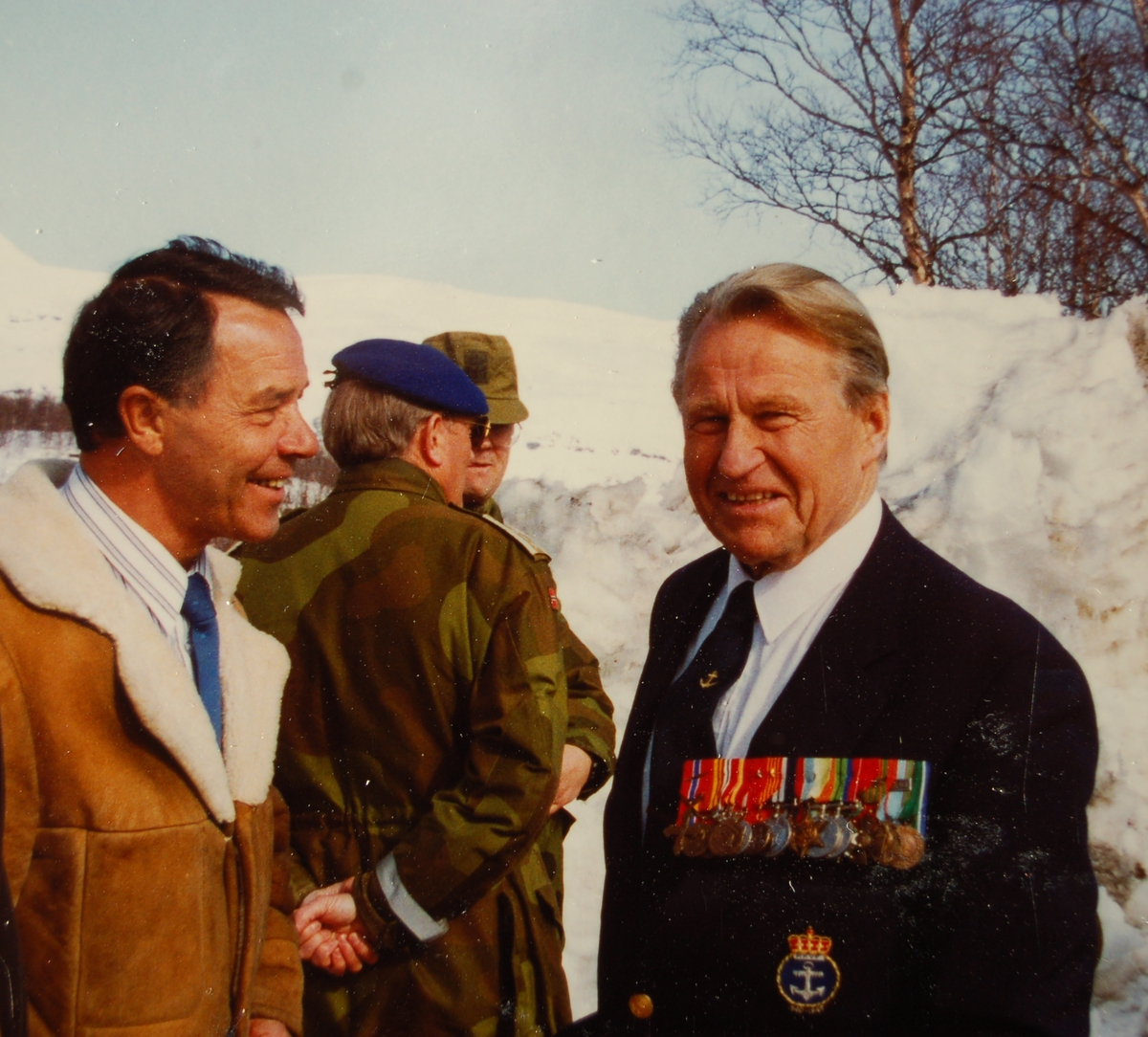
- Hugo Munthe-Kaas - Minnemarkering på Lapphaugen i april 1995 DF 5019
- Born: 3 February 1922; Norway
- Died: 19 March 2012 (aged 90); Hovseter Hjemmet Oslo
- Military career
- Allegiance: Norway
- Branch: Norwegian Army; Royal Norwegian Navy
- Service years: 1940–1983
- Units: 6th Division; Norwegian Armed Forces in exile Secret Intelligence Service; Westminster Dragoons; Norwegian Army Command Germany
- Commands: Garrison of Sør-Varanger
- Conflicts: Second World War: Norwegian Campaign; Battles of Narvik; Normandy landings
- Awards: Norwegian: War Cross with sword War Medal; Defence Medal 1940–1945 with rosette Haakon VII 70th Anniversary Medal; French: Chevalier of the Legion of Honour; Croix de Guerre with bronze palm Médaille de la Reconnaissance for 1939-1945; British: Distinguished Service Medal; War Medal 1939–1945; Defence Medal; Atlantic Star; United Nations: United Nations Service Medal for ONUC
- Other work: Politician

Hugo Conrad Munthe-Kaas DSM (3 February 1922 – 19 March 2012) was a Norwegian intelligence agent and resistance fighter during World War II. He received most decorations in Norway for his war service. From the 1970s he was active in the Progress Party, where he was a city council member in Oslo and deputy MP. He was an honorary party member.

Hugo Munthe-Kaas was a Norwegian intelligence agent and resistance fighter during World War II. Throughout the spring of 1940, at the age of 18, he fought against the German invasion. After armed resistance was crushed and the German occupation of Norway was established, he went to England, where he became trained and served as a secret agent of the British Intelligence Service.

In 1943, King Haakon VII decorated the 21-year-old Munthe-Kaas with the War Cross with Sword, Norway's highest medal for exceptional contribution in war. Great Britain honored him with their Distinguished Service Medal (DSM), the highest medal given to non-commissioned officers, and France presented him with their Legion of Honor and the War Cross.

== Military career ==
=== Early life and World War II ===
Munthe-Kaas was the son of Otto H. Munthe-Kaas and younger brother of Otto Ulrik Munthe-Kaas, both military officers. His father was, before World War II, head of the military camp at Setermoen, and was head of the II Field Battalion in the 16th Infantry Regiment during the German invasion of Norway. Hugo Munthe-Kaas had before the outbreak of the war, volunteered for the guard company in Tromsø, where he served during the German attack. He then joined the war commissary in Tromsø and was accepted for service in the 16th Infantry Regiment, despite being two years too young for conscription. Munthe-Kaas served during the campaign in Northern Norway as an orderly in the courier service and as a sniper in the Battles of Narvik. His service lasted until the Norwegian mainland capitulation on 10 June 1940.

After the surrender of mainland Norway, Munthe-Kaas was demobilized and he continued secondary school in Tromsø in early 1941. In April that year he was recruited into the Norwegian resistance movement owing to the efforts of the journalist Sverre Larsen from the Tromsø newspaper. In mid 1941 he went on to Trondheim to study at Trondheim Commerce School. In Trondheim he was again involved with the resistance and, among other things, he did intelligence work covering the German U-boat base in the city, which allowed British planes to bomb the major transformer station at the port in early 1942. In April of the same year he came over to Britain with the fishing boat Siglaos, skippered by Leif Andreas Larsen.

=== In the United Kingdom ===
In the United Kingdom, Munthe-Kaas joined the exiled Norwegian forces. He was soon recruited by the British Secret Intelligence Service for special assignments in Norway. He underwent training as a radio operator and a commando soldier. Based in the United Kingdom, through the war years he carried out several operations in occupied Norway, arriving both by air and submarine.

For the British the need for intelligence information from Norway increased after the larger German ships was transferred to Norwegian waters. They realized that the threat to the convoy route to and from the Soviet Union was growing, and were particularly concerned with the threat that the German battleship Tirpitz posed after the ship moved north. It became important for the British to establish a network of stations from northern Nordland to Troms, so that intelligence information about German ship movements could be sent to the UK. Munthe-Kaas was assigned such a mission, contributing to the creation of a network of agents with radios in July 1942. During the night of 15 July 1942 he was delivered to Langøya in Vesterålen by a Norwegian PBY Catalina. He established the radio station LIBRA and in the summer of 1942 worked to organize the intelligence network that monitored the movements of the Tirpitz in northern Norwegian waters.

After the first successful operation in Norway, Munthe-Kaas, together with his father, who had been arrested, (but made sure Munthe-Kaas was transferred to the hospital), went to neutral Sweden and then traveled back to Britain. He was later followed by his father, who eventually became the Norwegian military attache in Washington, DC. In October 1942 Munthe-Kaas was involved in Operation Upsilon, and in mid-November he was together with other Norwegian soldiers and 60 tons of equipment, brought over to Mefjorden on Senja by the French submarine Junon. On his return to Britain, he began work at the Norwegian Military Academy in London in December 1942, where he continued until early 1943.

=== The second half of the war ===
Munthe-Kaas was sent to Norway once more in March 1943, again with the Junon, during Upsilon III. The objective of the operation was to deliver a further 60 tons of supplies, and bring out two French and two Norwegian soldiers who had been left in Mefjorden during the previous raid. These four had managed to remain hidden with the help of residents in Mefjordvær. The rescue of the four was considered a significant achievement and resulted in that Munthe-Kaas was rewarded a distinction, both from Norway, France and the United Kingdom.

The repeated missions in occupied Norway posed a risk both for himself and for the intelligence service. As a result, Munthe-Kaas was transferred to another service in 1943. After the Military Academy, he continued with British military training and was transferred to the Westminster Dragoons, where he was a tank commander, but he was not sent on active service.

In early 1944, Munthe-Kaas reported for duty with the Royal Norwegian Navy in the United Kingdom, where he was stationed aboard the motor torpedo boat MTB 627, which served in the English Channel. During the Normandy Landings in June 1944 Munthe-Kaas' motor torpedo boat was part of the naval force which protected the invasion fleet against German attacks. He continued motor torpedo boat service until September, when he was again assigned to a mission in Norway. It was led by Major Paul M. Strande and bore the code-name Elg. The base would be ready for combat in case of an Allied invasion in Norway, or in the case if the German forces in Norway decided to fight rather than surrender. Together with other Norwegian soldiers, Munthe-Kaas was paradropped over Eastern Norway on 26 November 1944. Munthe-Kaas was assigned head of the area BA I and was at Elg until Germany's capitulation. At war's end, Munthe-Kaas had risen through the ranks to lieutenant.

=== Post-war ===
After the end of the war in 1945, Munthe-Kaas became a civilian and worked at the herring oil factory in Tromsø, where his father was the manager for many years. However, he soon went back to the military, achieving a number of key positions in the army.

He served as an intelligence officer in Northern Norway and later served in the same role in the Independent Norwegian Brigade Group in Germany. In 1949 he was stationed in London, where he served as assistant military attaché at the Norwegian embassy. From 1950 to 1952 he was the Norwegian military attaché in the United Kingdom. Munthe-Kaas participated as part of the Norwegian military delegation, in the funeral procession of King George VI of the United Kingdom in London on 15 February 1952.

Upon returning to Norway he was appointed head of Garnisonen i Sør-Varanger and was from 1955 to 1960 assistant border commissioner. He also served abroad on several occasions, including as an assistant to the Supreme Allied Commander Europe in Paris in 1962. From 1963 to 1964 he participated in Norwegian UN troops in Congo. In 1965 he was stationed at Heistadmoen, before he became chief of the army's paratrooper school at Trandum, where he served from 1969 until 1972. He resigned from the Armed Forces in 1983.

== Awards ==
For his efforts during Upsilon III, when a Sergeant, Munthe-Kaas was honoured by the King in Council with the Norwegian War Cross with sword on 2 July 1943. The citation mentioned in particular the efforts to rescue two French and two Norwegian soldiers during the operation with the French submarine Junon. The diploma accompanying the War Cross was labeled "For particularly deserving effort in connection with secret military operations". France honoured him with the appointment of Chevalier (Knight) of the Légion d'honneur and he was also awarded the Croix de Guerre with bronze palm. In 1943 he was awarded the British Distinguished Service Medal, an award that was presented by the First Sea Lord, John Cunningham. This was the highest British award available at the time for non-commissioned military personnel.

For his service during the Second World War, Munthe-Kaas was also awarded the British War Medal, Defence Medal and the Atlantic Star, the Norwegian War Medal, the Defence Medal with rosette and Haakon VII 70th Anniversary Medal. In conjunction with the 50th anniversary of the Normandy landings, he was also presented with the French Médaille de la Reconnaissance for 1939–1945.

Munthe-Kaas was also awarded a United Nations Medal for his ONUC-operation in the Congo.

In all, Munthe-Kaas has been awarded 17 military decorations for his work during and after the Second World War. In 2008 he donated his awards to the Military Academy in Oslo.

Ribbons of Munthe-Kaas' awards
  - Norway
    - Norwegian War Cross with sword
    - War Medal
    - Defence Medal 1940–1945
    - Haakon VII 70th Anniversary Medal
  - United Kingdom
    - Distinguished Service Medal
    - War Medal 1939–1945
    - Defence Medal
    - Atlantic Star
  - France
    - Chevalier of the Légion d'honneur
    - Croix de Guerre with bronze palm
    - Médaille de reconnaissance de la Nation
  - United Nations
    - United Nations Service Medal for ONUC

== Political career ==
Munthe-Kaas has also been politically active. He supported the Conservative Party until 1977, when he joined the Progress Party. He was deputy chairman of the Progress Party from 1980 to 1982. He was deputy member of parliament for Akershus in the Norwegian parliament from 1981 to 1985. From 1984 he represented the Progress Party in the Oslo City Council. He has also been county chairman in the Akershus Progress Party. Munthe-Kaas was an honorary member of the Progress Party.

He died in 2012.

== Literature ==
- Christensen, Dag, Hemmelig agent i Norge. Den utrolige beretningen om Hugo Munthe-Kaas - i britisk spesialtjeneste mot tyskerne. Oslo, 1987.
- Scott, Astrid Karlsen, Silent Patriot: Norway's Most Highly Decorated WWII Soldier a Secret Agent. Nordic Adventures, Olympia, WA, 2004.
