= Ersfjordbotn =

Village in Tromsø Municipality, Norway

- Village
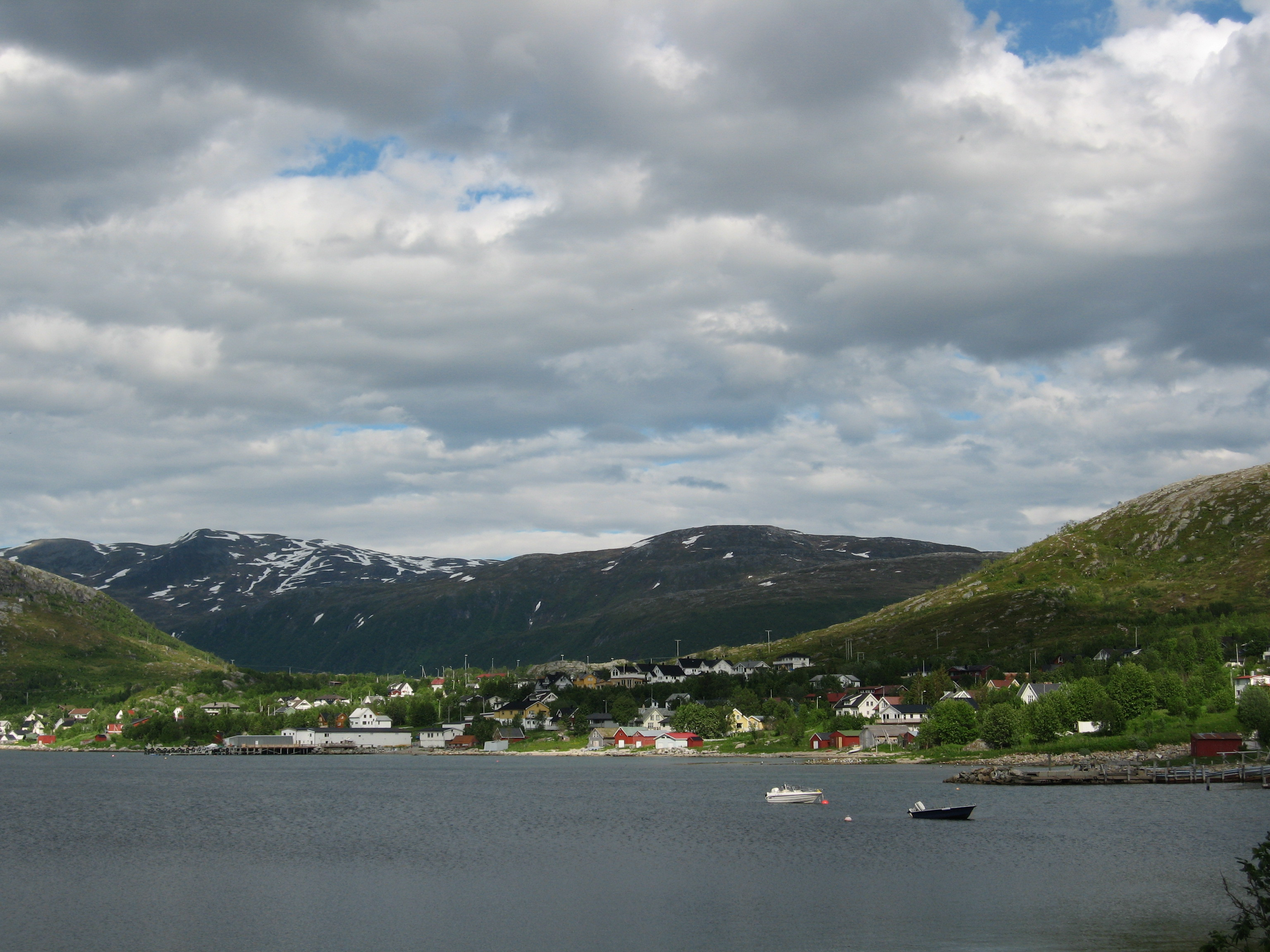
- View of the village
- Interactive map of Ersfjordbotn
- Location within Troms Location within Norway
- Coordinates: 69.69428°N 18.62055°E
- Country: Norway
- Region: Northern Norway
- County: Troms
- District: Midt-Troms
- Municipality: Tromsø Municipality

Area
  - Total: 0.31 km^{2} (0.12 sq mi)
- Elevation: 0.5 m (1.6 ft)

Population (2023)
  - Total: 484
  - Density: 1,561/km^{2} (4,040/sq mi)
- Time zone: UTC+01:00 (CET)
  - Summer (DST): UTC+02:00 (CEST)
- Post Code: 9107 Kvaløya

Ersfjordbotn is a village in Tromsø Municipality in Troms county, Norway. The village is located on an isthmus between the Ersfjorden and the Kaldfjorden on the island of Kvaløya. It is about 15 kilometres (9.3 mi) west of the city of Tromsø. The villages of Kjosen and Kvaløysletta are located just to the east of Ersfjordbotn.

Ersfjordbotn is slowly moving from a traditional rural settlement to a suburb of Tromsø, and most people work in Tromsø, half an hour's drive away. The 0.31-square-kilometre (77-acre) village has a population (2023) of 484 which gives the village a population density of 1,561 inhabitants per square kilometre (4,040/sq mi).

== Media gallery ==
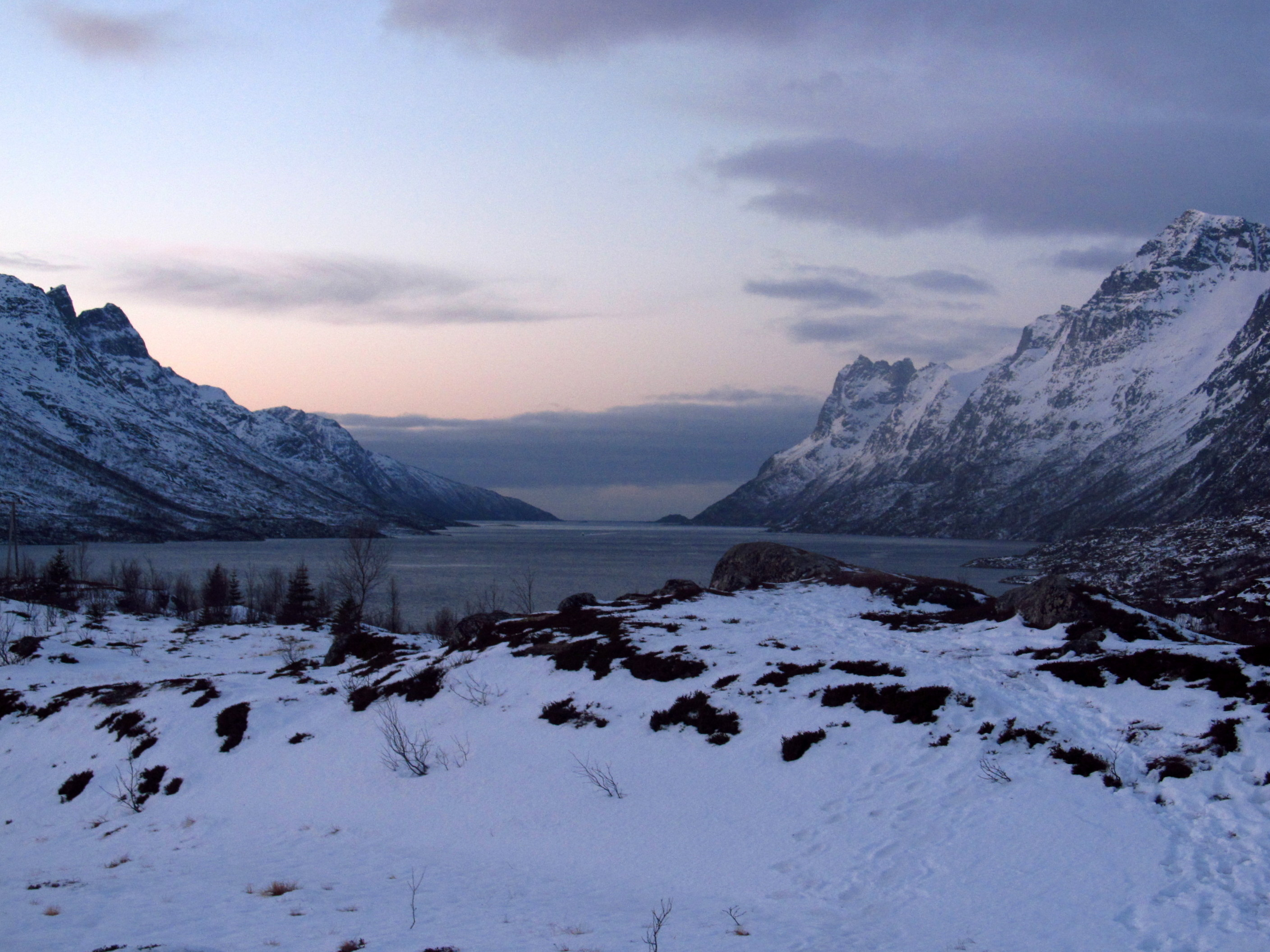
View of Ersfjorden in the winter, up behind the village of Ersfjordbotn (Dec 2012)

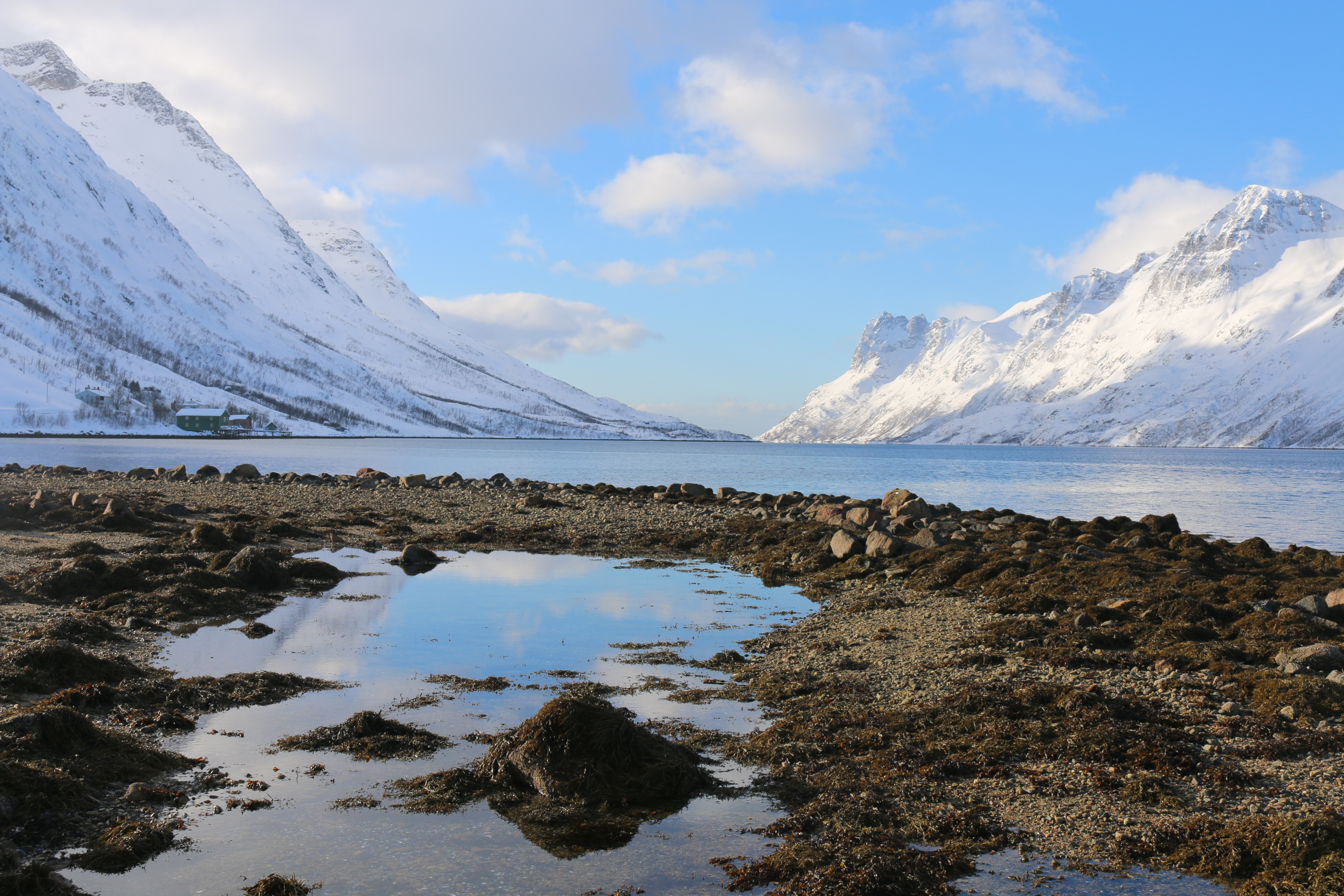

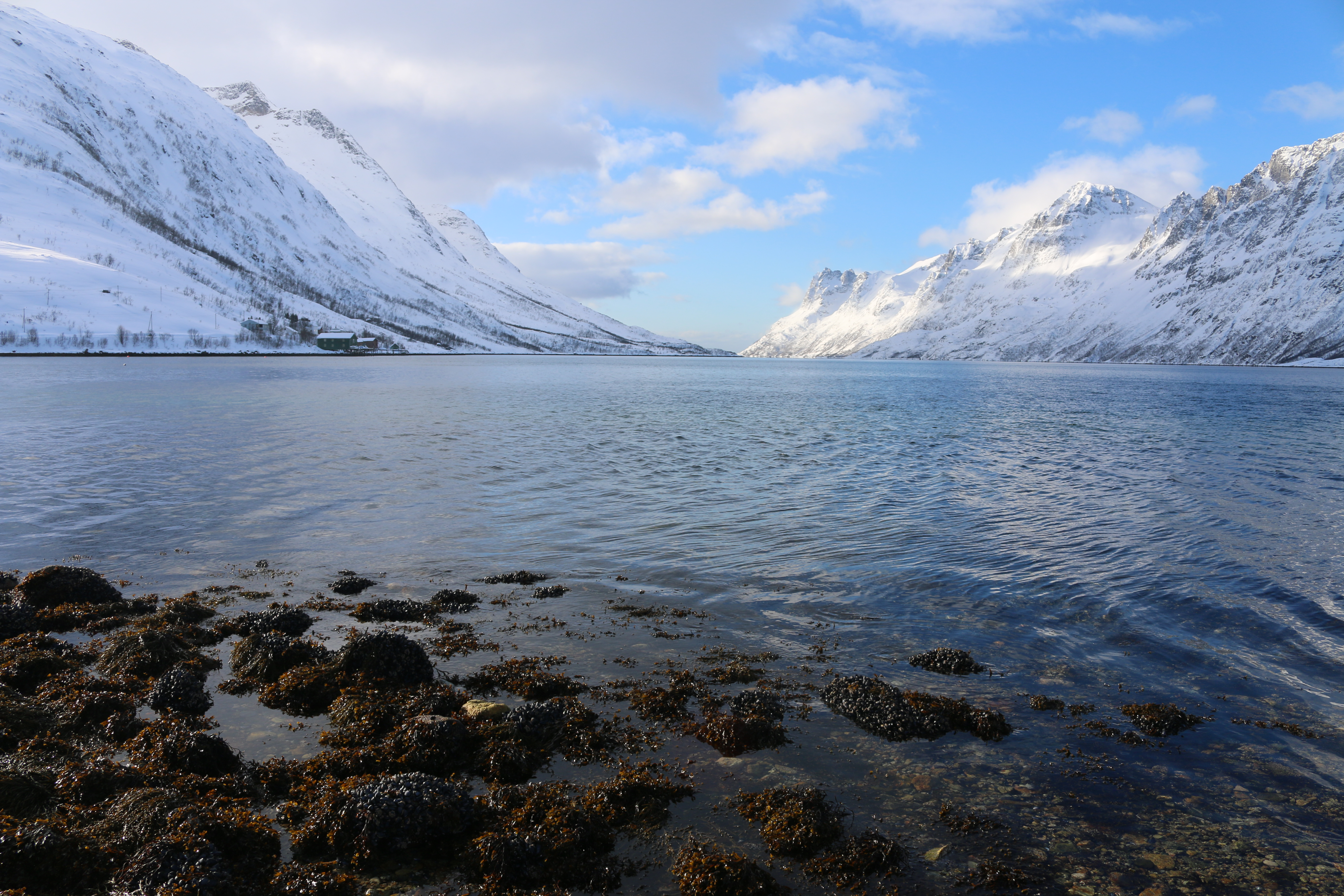

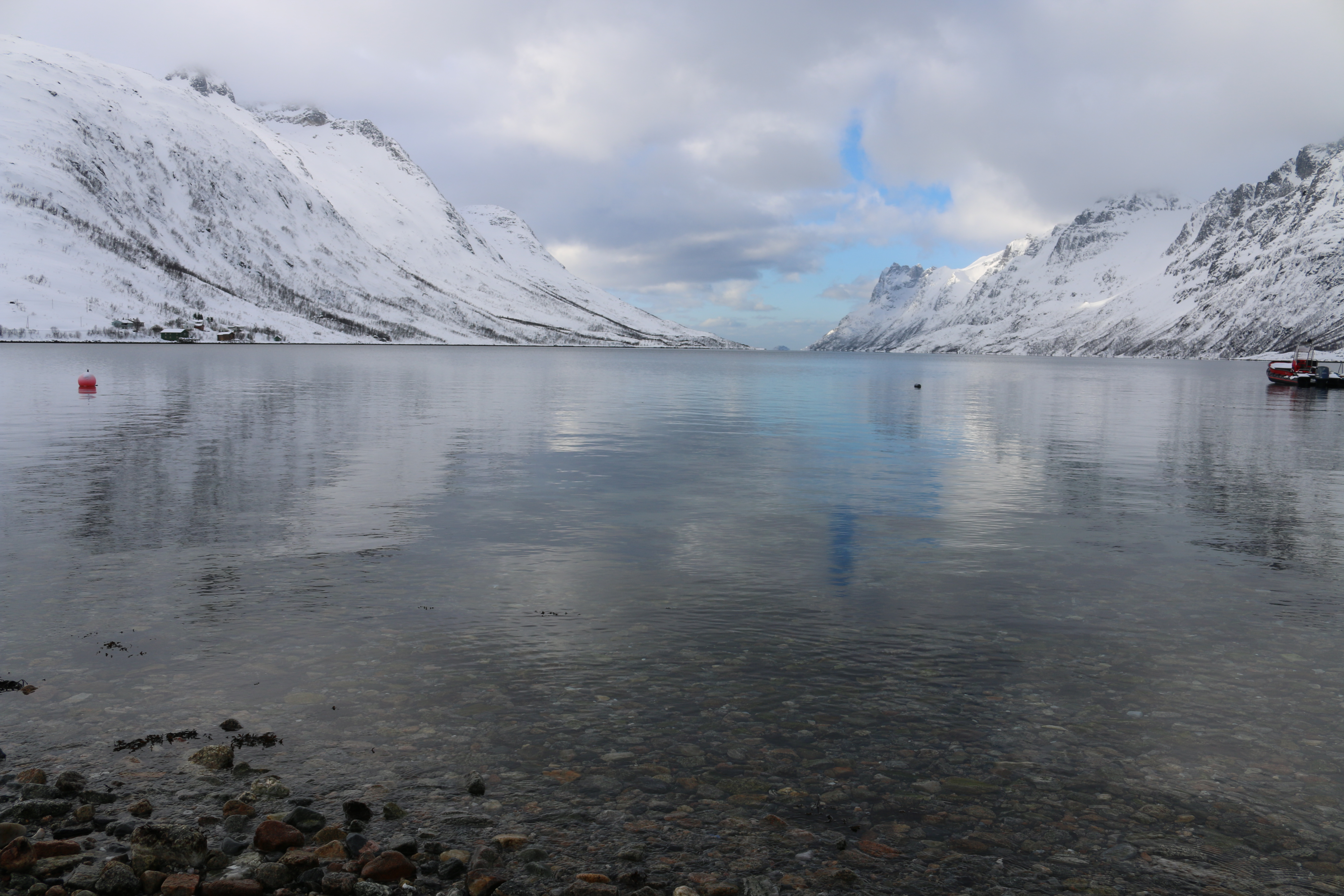
