= Senjahopen =

Village in Senja Municipality, Norway

- Village
- Interactive map of Senjahopen
- Location within Troms Location within Norway
- Coordinates: 69°29′53″N 17°29′29″E
- Country: Norway
- Region: Northern Norway
- County: Troms
- District: Midt-Troms
- Municipality: Senja Municipality

Area
  - Total: 0.38 km^{2} (0.15 sq mi)
- Elevation: 0.5 m (1.6 ft)

Population (2023)
  - Total: 257
  - Density: 676/km^{2} (1,750/sq mi)
- Time zone: UTC+01:00 (CET)
  - Summer (DST): UTC+02:00 (CEST)
- Post Code: 9386 Senjahopen

Senjahopen or Senjehopen is a village in Senja Municipality in Troms county, Norway. Senjahopen is located along the Medfjorden on the northwest part of the large island of Senja, where it is one of the most important fishing villages on the island. Another nearby fishing village is Mefjordvær, which located about 3 kilometres (1.9 mi) to the northwest.

The 0.38-square-kilometre (94-acre) village has a population (2023) of 257 and a population density of 676 inhabitants per square kilometre (1,750/sq mi).

== History ==
The village used to belong to the old Berg Municipality, but Senjahopen was not connected by road to the rest of the municipality. Senjahopen is about 10 km (6.2 mi) north of the nearby village of Skaland (the municipal center of Berg Municipality), the trip took well over an hour to drive since a large mountainous area was between the two villages and the only road went a long way around the mountains, going nearly all the way around the island. In 2004, a new tunnel (Geitskartunnelen) was opened going through the mountain, and this new road cut about 95 km (59 mi) off of the trip between the two villages.
