= Otto Hjersing Munthe-Kaas =

Norwegian politician and businessman

- Born: 31 August 1883; Fredrikshald, Norway
- Died: 25 June 1981 (aged 97)
- Resting place: Vestre gravlund
- Occupations: Army officer Businessman; Politician
- Children: Hugo Munthe-Kaas
- Relatives: Hugo Munthe-Kaas (brother)
- Awards: St. Olav's Medal with Oak Branch

Otto Hjersing Munthe-Kaas (31 August 1883 – 25 June 1981) was a Norwegian politician, businessman and military officer.

He was born in Fredrikshald as a son of Hugo Severin Munthe-Kaas and Ragna Hjersing and younger brother of Hugo Munthe-Kaas, and graduated as officer in 1904. He was manager of Jøvik Sildolje- & Kraftforfabrik from 1914 to 1942. He was a member of the municipal council of Tromsø from 1916 to 1923, and served as mayor of Tromsø from 1920 to 1921. He was a deputy representative to the Storting from 1924 to 1927. During World War II he took part in the Norwegian Campaign in 1940, served with the Norwegian Army High Command in London from 1942 to 1943, was military attaché in Washington from 1943 to 1944, and served as Allied Zone Commander in Tromsø in 1945. His books include The Campaign of Northern Norway from 1944, Krigen i Norge 1940. Operasjonene gjennom Romerike-Hedemarken-Gudbrandsdalen-Romsdalen from 1955, and Norges grensevakt i nordøst from 1964. His awards include the St. Olav's Medal with Oak Branch. He died in 1981 and is buried at Vestre gravlund.
