= Ingrid Bjerkås =

Norwegian theologian

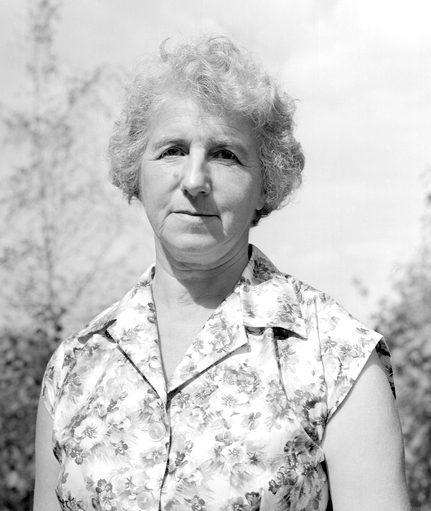
- Born: May 8, 1901; Oslo
- Died: November 30, 1980 (aged 79); Bærum

Ingrid Bjerkås (8 May 1901 – 30 November 1980) was a Norwegian theologian and the first female minister in the Church of Norway.

== Early life ==
She was born in Kristiania as a daughter of Olaf Johansen (1874–1958) and Hilda Charlotte Elise Holmsen (1874–1953). She finished her secondary education in 1920, married Søren Alexius Bjerkås (1895–1965) in 1922 and became a housewife. They lived in Bærum. In 1941, during the occupation of Norway by Nazi Germany, she wrote two letters to Vidkun Quisling, accusing him of treason and demanding his withdrawal from politics. Nazi physician Hans Eng hinted to her being a psychopath. In 1943 she sent a similar letter to Josef Terboven, protesting the crackdown on Norwegian students following the 1943 University of Oslo fire. She was arrested by the Nazis and was incarcerated in Grini concentration camp from 17 December 1943 to 31 January 1944, then at Bærum Hospital until 19 December 1944.

== Priesthood ==
After the war she taught at a Sunday school for some years before enrolling at the University of Oslo. She graduated with the cand.theol. in 1958, and took the practical-theological examination in 1960. She was ordained by the Bishop of Hamar, Kristian Schjelderup at Vang Church in March 1961. This act was the cause of strong protests from church members and church officials alike. Immediately after her ordination, six of the nine bishops of the Bishop Collegium refused to accept her into the holy orders and stated that "we find it impossible to reconcile female ministry with the New Testament because of the attitude and direct statements. The Word denies women access to pastoral as well as teaching offices, and justifies this principle as God's creation scheme and the Lord's own will. So, we are bound by the word of God that the principles we are committed to must be followed". The other bishops agreed to the request.

Eventually, she was hired as vicar in the Berg og Torsken prestegjeld (covering Berg Municipality and Torsken Municipality). Some still would not accept a female minister. She resigned in June 1965, one month after the death of her husband. She returned to Bærum, and was a priest at Martina Hansen's Hospital from 1966 to 1971. She issued the book Mitt kall ("My Calling") in 1966. She died in November 1980 in Bærum.
