= Mefjordvær Chapel =

- Mefjordvær kapell
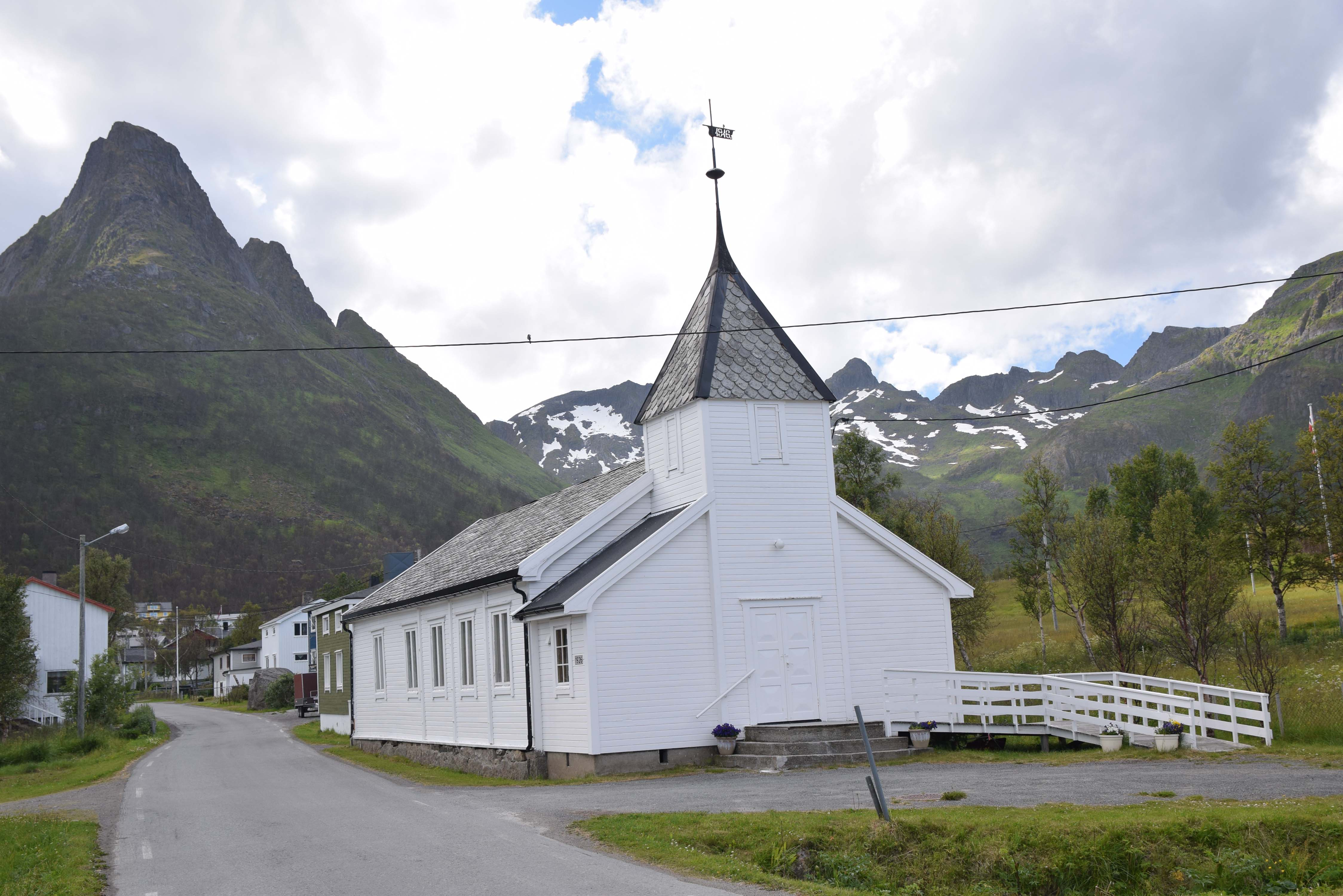
- View of the chapel
- Mefjordvær Chapel
- 69.5169179°N 17.4391319°E
- Location: Senja Municipality, Troms
- Country: Norway
- Denomination: Church of Norway
- Churchmanship: Evangelical Lutheran

History
- Status: Chapel
- Founded: 15th century
- Consecrated: 1916

Architecture
- Functional status: Active
- Architect: Ludvig Lorentzen
- Architectural type: Long church
- Completed: 1916 (110 years ago)
- Closed: (1808-1916)

Specifications
- Capacity: 120
- Materials: Wood

Administration
- Diocese: Nord-Hålogaland
- Deanery: Senja prosti
- Parish: Berg
- Norwegian Cultural Heritage Site
- Type: Church
- Status: Listed
- ID: 84927

Mefjordvær Chapel (Norwegian: Mefjordvær kapell) is a chapel of the Church of Norway in Senja Municipality in Troms county, Norway. It is located in the village of Mefjordvær on the northern coast of the island of Senja. It is an annex chapel for the Berg parish which is part of the Senja prosti (deanery) in the Diocese of Nord-Hålogaland. The white, wooden chapel was built in a long church style in 1916 using plans drawn up by the architect Ludvig Lorentzen. The chapel seats about 120 people.

== History ==
The earliest existing historical records of the church date back to the year 1589, but the church was not new that year. The original church site was located about 200 metres (660 ft) northwest of the present church site. In 1641, the church was described as "newly improved", meaning the building must have been renovated or newly built. Over 100 years later, in 1753 the church was described as being dilapidated. By 1760, the church had been torn down and replaced with a new church on the same site. The new church was a timber-framed long church with no tower or sacristy. It had an entry porch and a sod roof. In 1809, the church was closed down and its furniture moved to the nearby Berg Church. The old church was still standing vacant in 1818 and looking quite run down. Eventually, the old church was torn down. About 100 years later, a new chapel was built in Mefjordvær, but this time it was built about 200 metres (660 ft) southeast of the historic church site.

== See also ==
- List of churches in Nord-Hålogaland
