= Skaland =

Village in Senja Municipality, Norway

Skaland (Norwegian); Birgi (Northern Sami)
- Village
- Interactive map of: Skaland (Norwegian); Birgi (Northern Sami)
- Location within Troms Location within Norway
- Coordinates: 69°26′40″N 17°17′53″E
- Country: Norway
- Region: Northern Norway
- County: Troms
- District: Midt-Troms
- Municipality: Senja Municipality

Area
  - Total: 0.38 km^{2} (0.15 sq mi)
- Elevation: 4 m (13 ft)

Population (2003)
  - Total: 225
  - Density: 590/km^{2} (1,500/sq mi)
- Time zone: UTC+01:00 (CET)
  - Summer (DST): UTC+02:00 (CEST)
- Post Code: 9385 Skaland

Skaland (Norwegian) or Birgi (Northern Sami) is a village in Senja Municipality in Troms county, Norway. The village is located on the shores of the Bergsfjorden on the northwest side of the island of Senja, about 15 km (9.3 mi) to the southwest of the village of Senjahopen and about 70 km (43 mi) southwest of the city of Tromsø. The village of Finnsæter is located about 4 kilometres (2.5 mi) across the fjord to the south.

The 0.38-square-kilometre (94-acre) village had a population (2003) of 225 and a population density of 592 inhabitants per square kilometre (1,530/sq mi). Since 2003, the population and area data for this village area has not been separately tracked by Statistics Norway.

The main employer in the area is the graphite factory, Skaland Grafitverk which was founded in 1917. Berg Church is also located in the village. The village was the administrative center of the old Berg Municipality until 1 January 2020 when it was merged into Senja Municipality.

== Media gallery ==
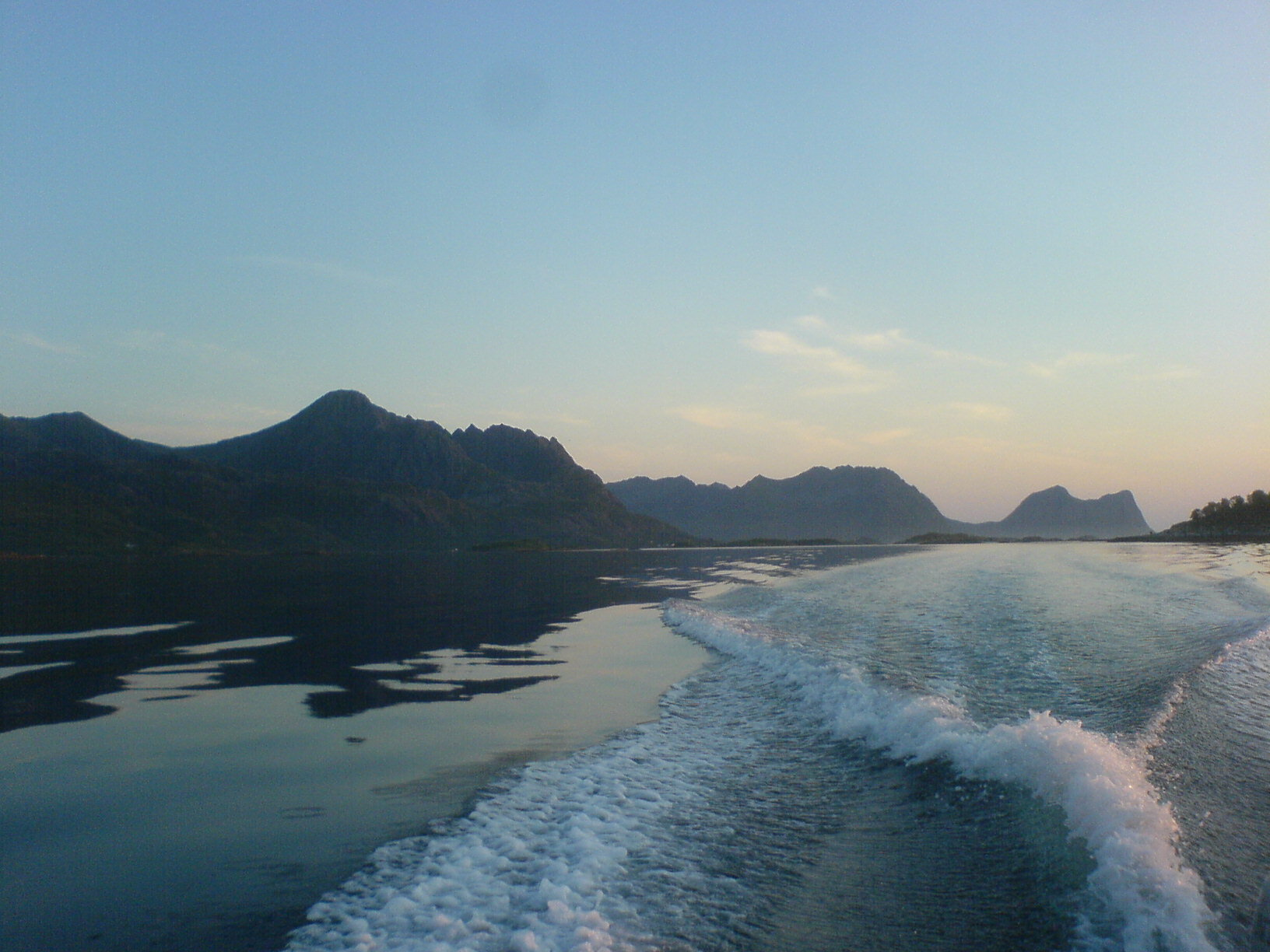
Finnsæter

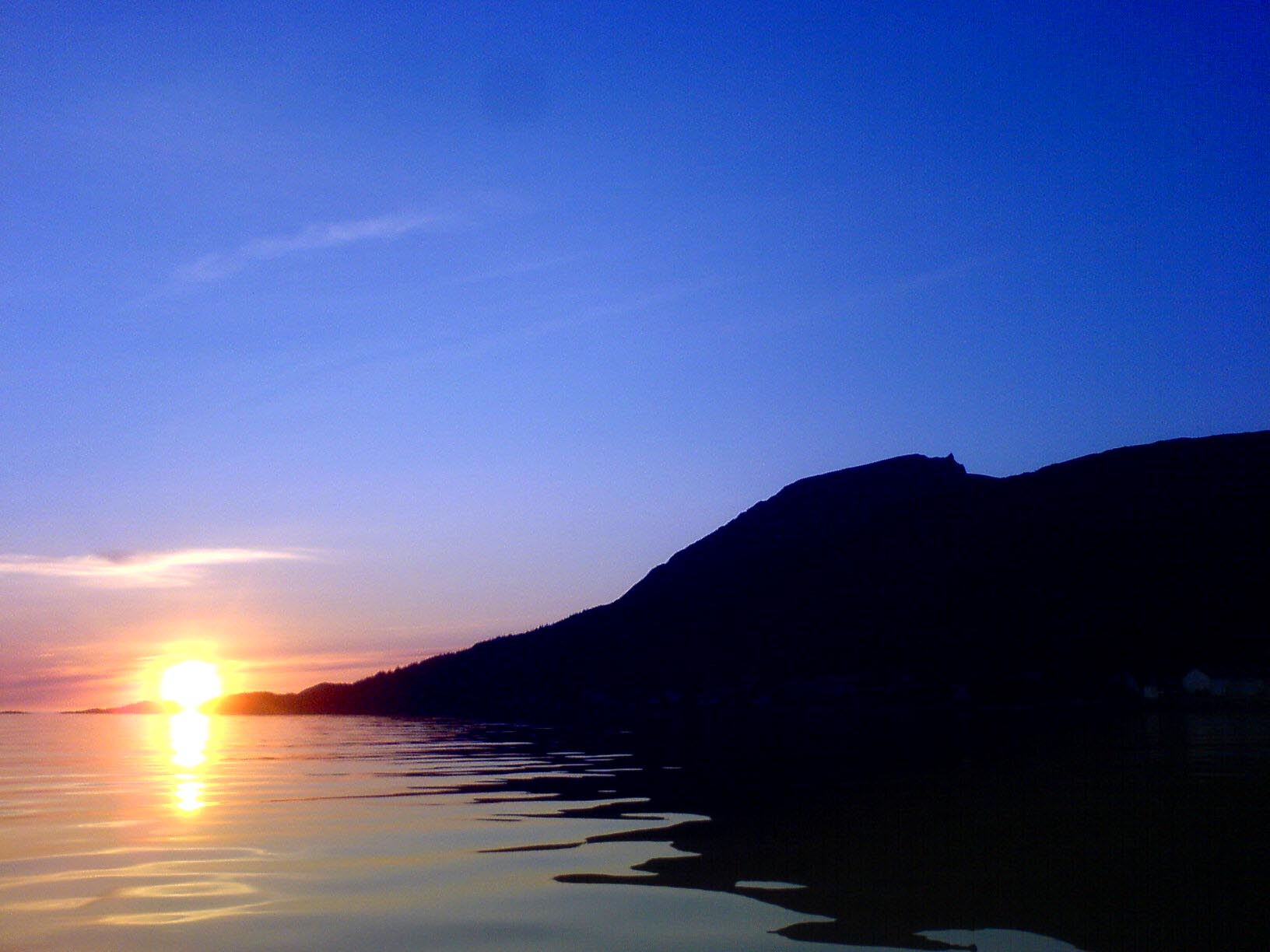
Solnedgang

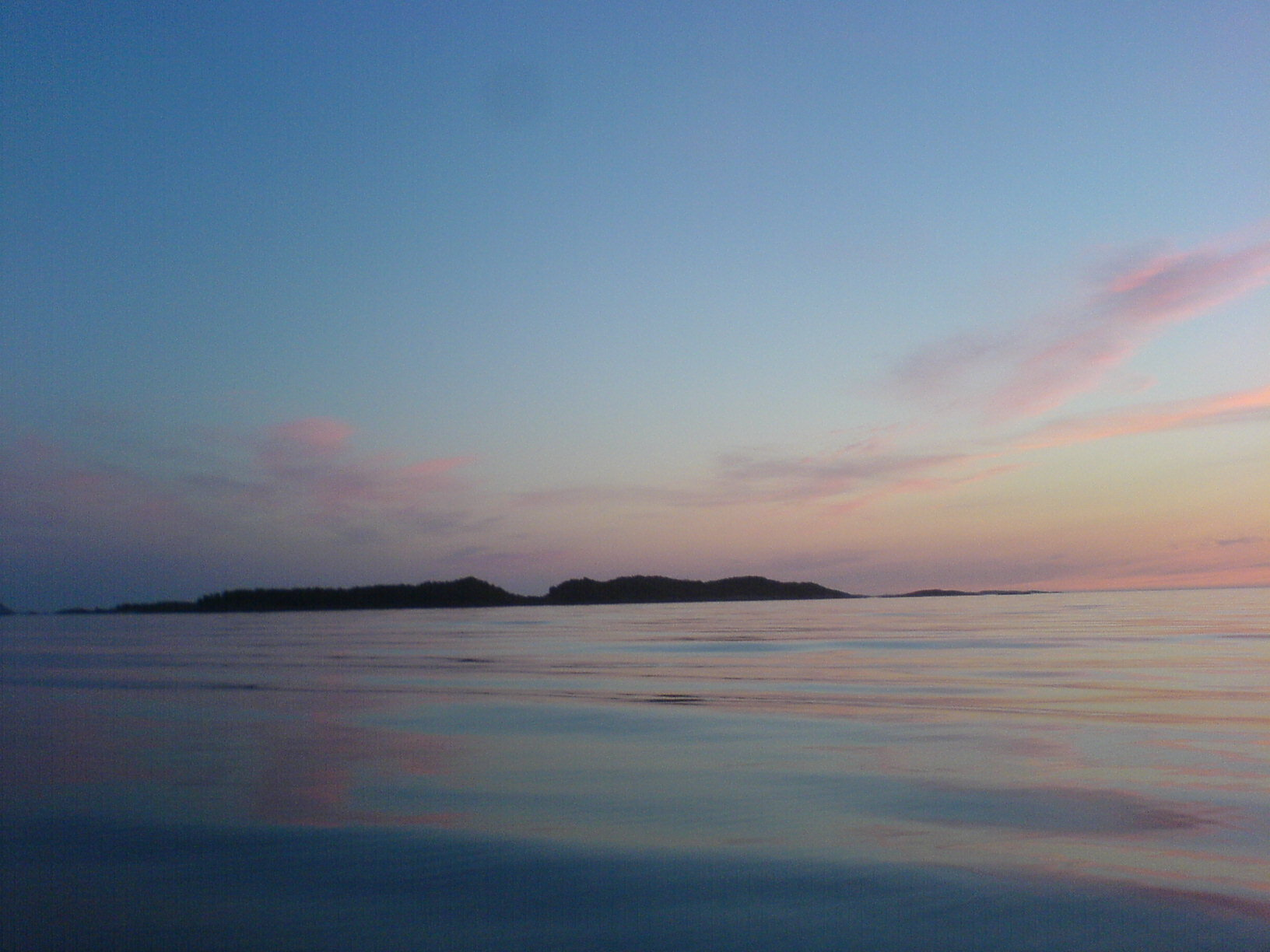
Bergsøyan

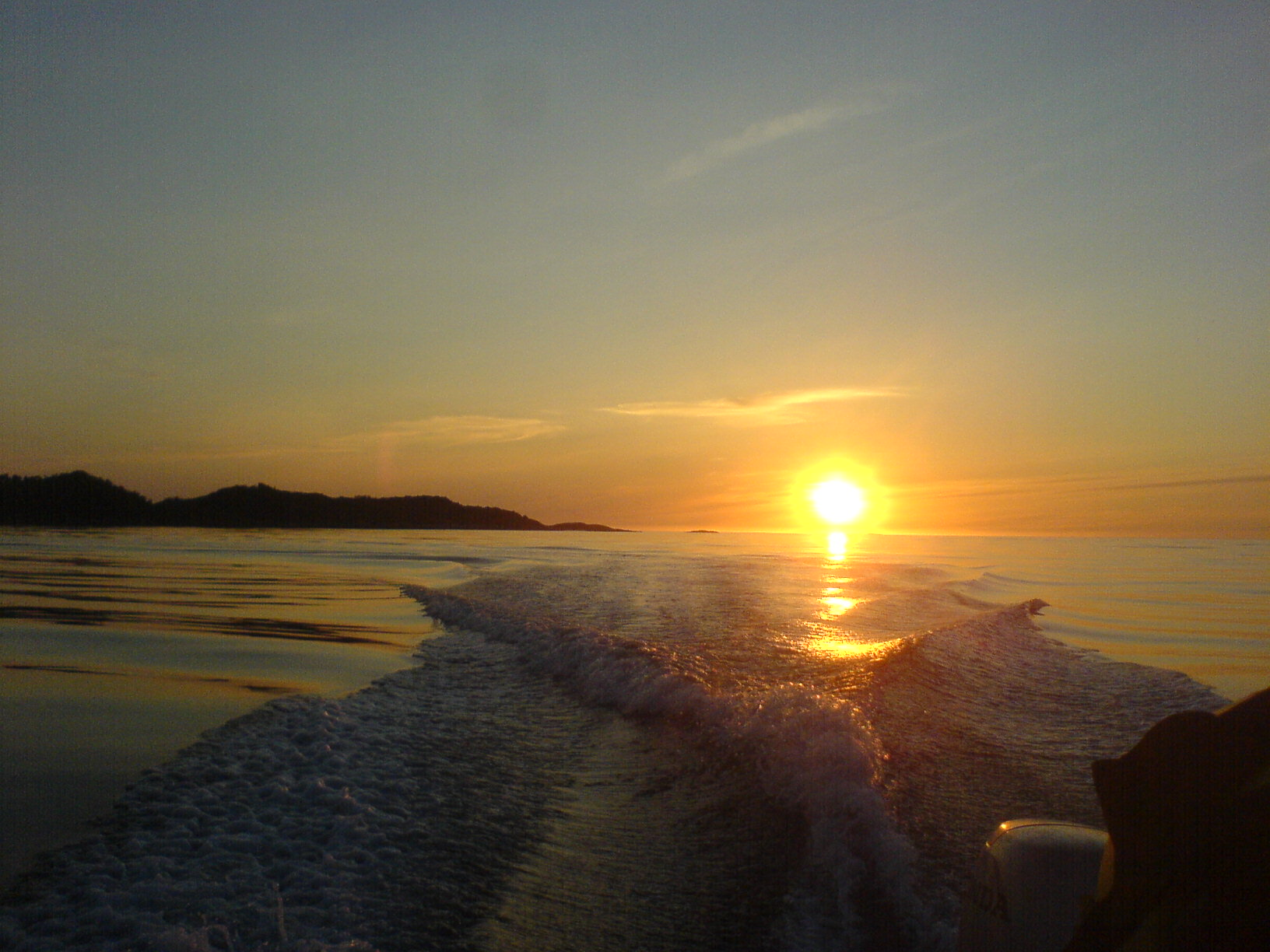
Bergsøyan
