= Senja Troll =

Hollow troll statue in Norway

Coordinates: 69.409786°N 17.263438°E

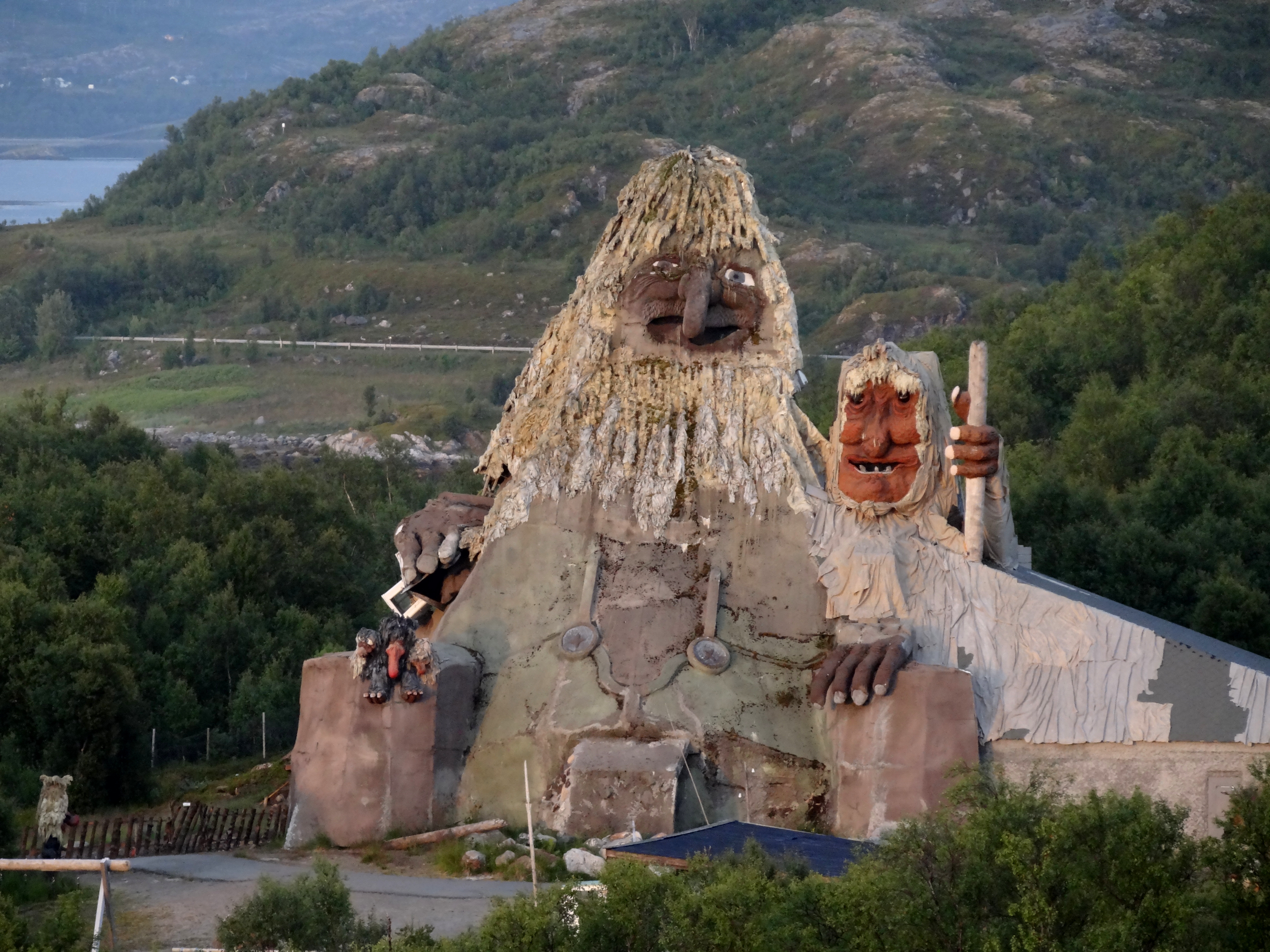
The Senja Troll and its wife

The Senja Troll (Norwegian: Senjatrollet) was a tourist attraction in Finnsæter on the island of Senja in northern Norway. The largest troll statue in the world, it was the centerpiece of a family park associated with the Hulderheimen cultural center, together known as the Hulder and Troll Park. Beside the troll was a wife, or crone (kjerring); an adventure park and other attractions were housed inside the figure. The structure was destroyed in a fire on March 28, 2019.

== History and facilities ==
The Hulderheimen cultural center in Finnsæter opened in 1989, named for a legend about a local mountain, the Hulderberg. The Senja Troll attraction opened nearby on June 1, 1993; it was built by Leif Rubach, who ran the attraction with his wife, Siw, dressed as a troll including fake troll feet, and called himself the "troll father". He was inspired by a local legend of a troll who appeared both on the island and in the sea nearby. The troll was made of injection-molded concrete, polyester, and plastic, was 17.96 metres (58.9 ft) high, and weighed 125,000 kilograms (123 long tons; 138 short tons); in 1997 Guinness World Records listed it as the world's largest troll. In 2007, after years of rivalry, the Hunderfossen Familiepark in Gudbrandsdalen conceded that their troll was not as tall.

Inside the troll was a two-story adventure park. In 2017, Rubach was planning to renovate this to add a section for fall and winter activities. There was also a miniature train, the "Sesam-train".

In 2007 a wife, or crone, was lowered beside the troll by crane; their union was blessed by a priest with two NRK program hosts serving jointly as best man, and in 2012 they had sextuplets, which were baptized.

On March 28, 2019, the Senja Troll caught fire and was destroyed within a few minutes. The cause of the fire was believed to be an old fan heater that exploded.
