= Finnsæter Chapel =

- Finnsæter kapell
- Finnsæter Chapel
- 69.409845°N 17.266715°E
- Location: Senja Municipality, Troms
- Country: Norway
- Denomination: Church of Norway
- Churchmanship: Evangelical Lutheran

History
- Status: Chapel
- Founded: 1982
- Consecrated: 29 August 1982

Architecture
- Functional status: Active
- Architect: Ric. Bjørn A/S
- Architectural type: Long church
- Completed: 1982 (44 years ago)

Specifications
- Capacity: 77
- Materials: Wood

Administration
- Diocese: Nord-Hålogaland
- Deanery: Senja prosti
- Parish: Berg

Finnsæter Chapel (Norwegian: Finnsæter kapell) is a chapel of the Church of Norway in Senja Municipality in Troms county, Norway. It is located in the village of Finnsæter. It is an annex chapel for the Berg parish which is part of the Senja prosti (deanery) in the Diocese of Nord-Hålogaland. The white, wooden chapel was built in a long church style in 1982 using plans drawn up by the architecture company Ric. Bjørn A/S. The chapel seats about 77 people. The chapel was consecrated on 29 August 1982 by the Bishop Arvid Nergård.

== See also ==
- List of churches in Nord-Hålogaland
