= Finnsæter =

Village in Senja Municipality, Norway

- Village
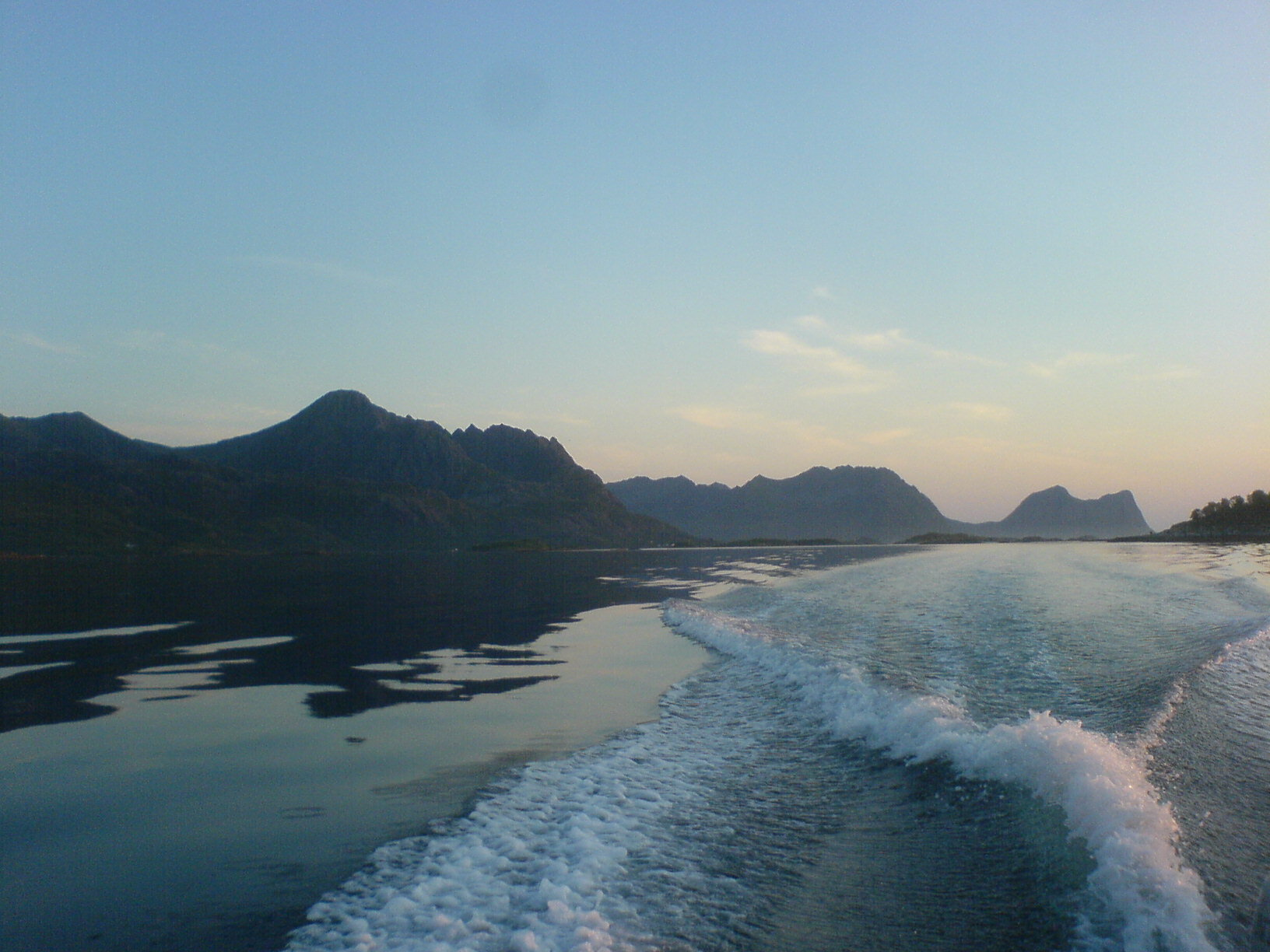
- View of the village in the background
- Interactive map of Finnsæter
- Location within Troms Location within Norway
- Coordinates: 69°24′47″N 17°15′17″E
- Country: Norway
- Region: Northern Norway
- County: Troms
- District: Midt-Troms
- Municipality: Senja Municipality
- Elevation: 3 m (9.8 ft)
- Time zone: UTC+01:00 (CET)
  - Summer (DST): UTC+02:00 (CEST)
- Post Code: 9385 Skaland

Finnsæter is a small village in Senja Municipality in Troms county, Norway. The village is located on the western coast of the island of Senja, about 4 kilometres (2.5 mi) across the Bergsfjorden from the municipal centre of Skaland. Finnsæter Chapel is located here, just off Norwegian County Road 86 as it passes through the village. The village is also the location of the Hulderheimen cultural centre with the Senja Troll family park.
