= Mefjordvær =

Village in Senja Municipality, Norway

Mefjordvær Medfjordvær (historic spelling)
- Village
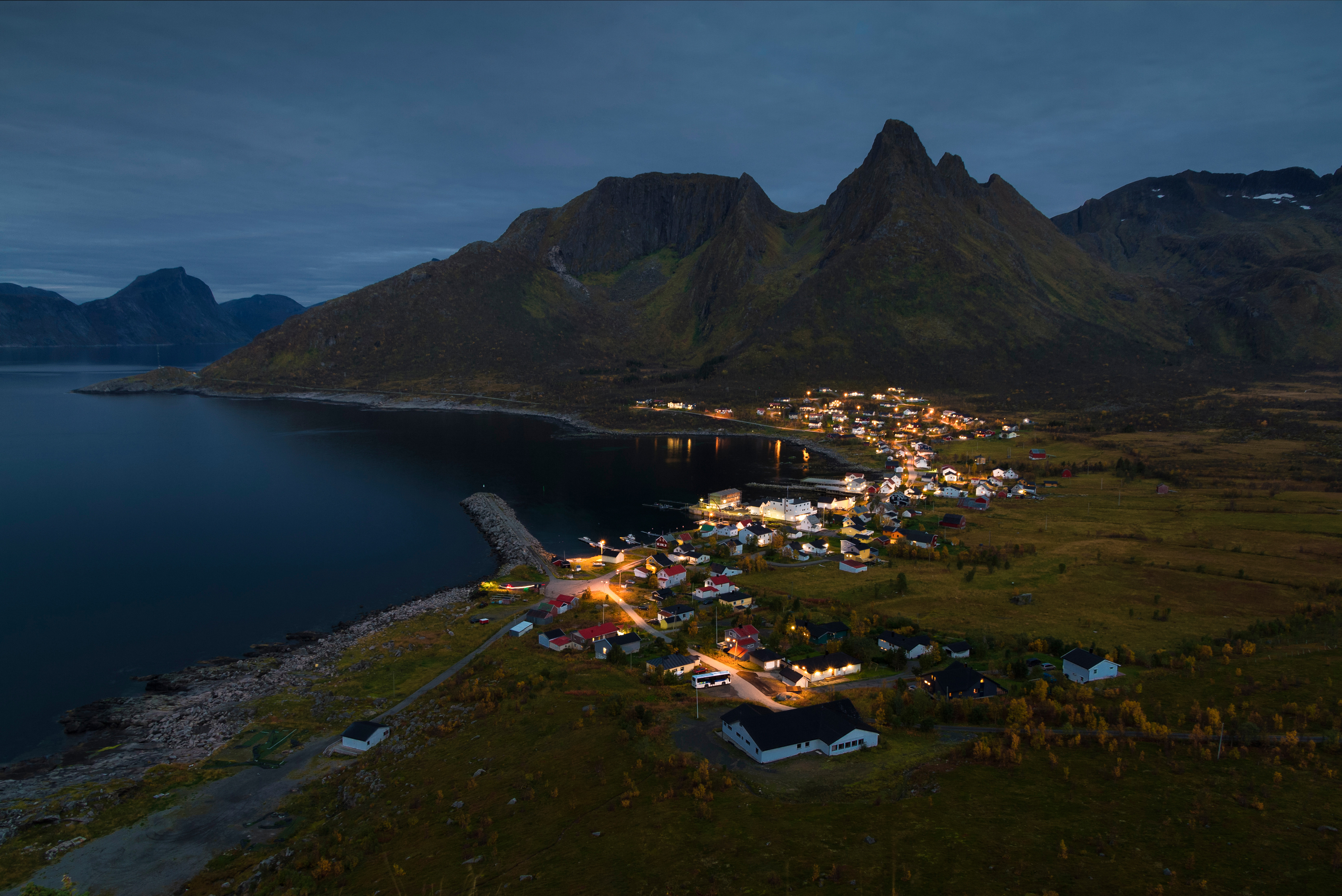
- View of the village
- Interactive map of Mefjordvær
- Location within Troms Location within Norway
- Coordinates: 69°31′07″N 17°26′18″E
- Country: Norway
- Region: Northern Norway
- County: Troms
- District: Midt-Troms
- Municipality: Senja Municipality
- Elevation: 2 m (6.6 ft)
- Time zone: UTC+01:00 (CET)
  - Summer (DST): UTC+02:00 (CEST)
- Post Code: 9386 Senjahopen

Mefjordvær (historic spelling: Medfjordvær) is a fishing village in Senja Municipality in Troms county, Norway. The village is located about 3.5 kilometres (2.2 mi) northwest of the village of Senjahopen, along the Medfjorden on the northwest coast of the large island of Senja. In 2001, there were 179 residents of the village. Mefjordvær Chapel is located in this village.
