= Berg Church (Senja) =

- Berg kirke
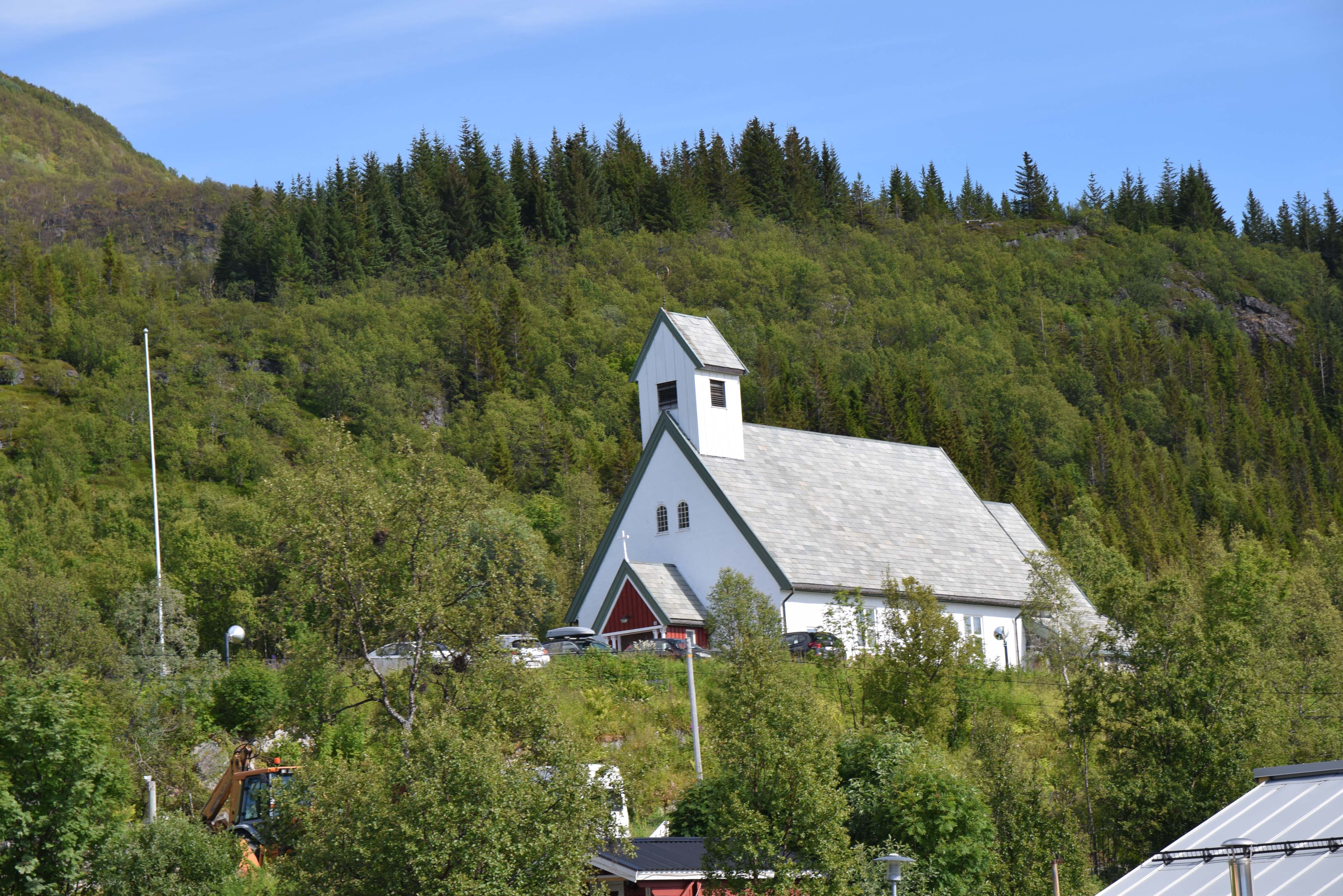
- View of the church
- Berg Church
- 69.4457978°N 17.2996138°E
- Location: Senja Municipality, Troms
- Country: Norway
- Denomination: Church of Norway
- Churchmanship: Evangelical Lutheran

History
- Status: Parish church
- Founded: 15th century
- Consecrated: 1955

Architecture
- Functional status: Active
- Architect: Hans Magnus
- Architectural type: Long church
- Completed: 1955 (71 years ago)

Specifications
- Capacity: 225
- Materials: Stone

Administration
- Diocese: Nord-Hålogaland
- Deanery: Senja prosti
- Parish: Berg
- Norwegian Cultural Heritage Site
- Type: Church
- Status: Not protected
- ID: 83875

Berg Church (Norwegian: Berg kirke) is a parish church of the Church of Norway in Senja Municipality in Troms county, Norway. It is located in the village of Skaland. It is the church for the Berg parish which is part of the Senja prosti (deanery) in the Diocese of Nord-Hålogaland. The white, stone church was built in a long church style in 1955 using plans drawn up by the architect Hans Magnus. The church seats about 225 people.

== History ==
The earliest existing historical records of the church date back to the year 1589, but the church was not new that year. It was likely founded in the 15th century. The church was originally located along the rocky shoreline of the island about 2 kilometres (1.2 mi) northwest of the present church site. The church was a long church with a small steeple over the nave and an entry porch. Starting in the mid-1600s, the local parishioners began complaining of the poor condition of the old church, however nothing was done.

Inspections of the building in 1753 and 1770 again noted that the church had fallen into disrepair. The priest at that time had requested that the church be moved to a location that was less rocky so that a cemetery around the church could be built. The priest's wish was not followed, however. The old church was torn down in 1780 and a new church was built in 1780–1781 on the same site. This was also a timber-framed long church where the nave measured about 9.5 by 7.5 metres (31 ft × 25 ft) and the choir measured about 4 by 5 metres (13 ft × 16 ft). It also had a small sacristy.

In 1814, this church served as an election church (Norwegian: valgkirke). Together with more than 300 other parish churches across Norway, it was a polling station for elections to the 1814 Norwegian Constituent Assembly which wrote the Constitution of Norway. This was Norway's first national elections. Each church parish was a constituency that elected people called "electors" who later met together in each county to elect the representatives for the assembly that was to meet at Eidsvoll Manor later that year.

In 1844, the church was thoroughly repaired and at the same time a new tower on the west end was constructed along with a new sacristy. In 1884, the church was renovated and expanded. During World War II in 1942, the church was demolished by the occupying German army.

After the war, a new church was built at Skaland, about 2 kilometres (1.2 mi) southeast of the old church site. The altarpiece carved in wood was decorated by Torvald Kildal Moseid (1917-2000). Moseid also designed the stained glass in the church. The organ is a pneumatic organ from Vestre Orgelfabrikk. The church bell is from Olsen Nauen Bell Foundry (Olsen Nauen Klokkestøperi).

== Media gallery ==
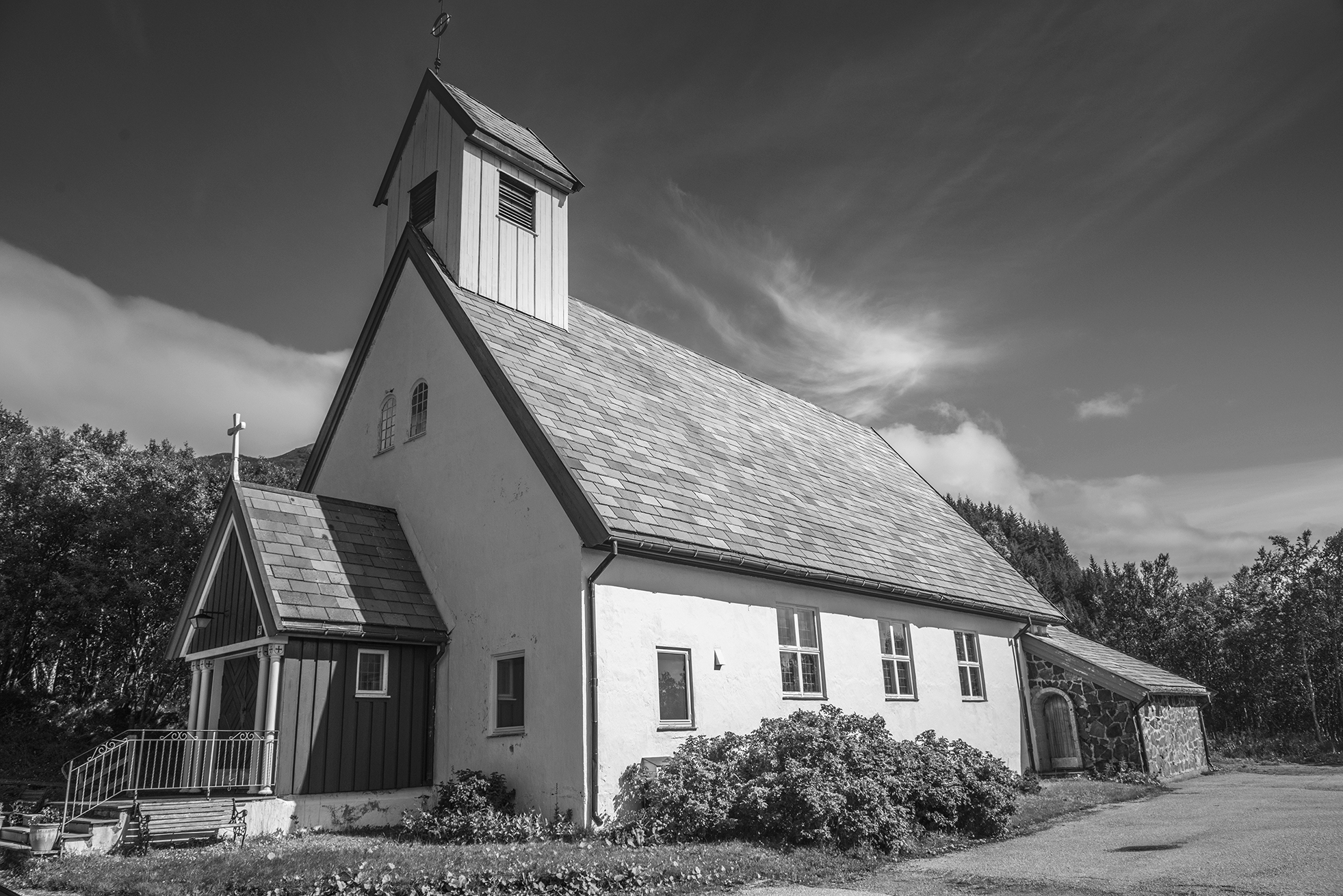

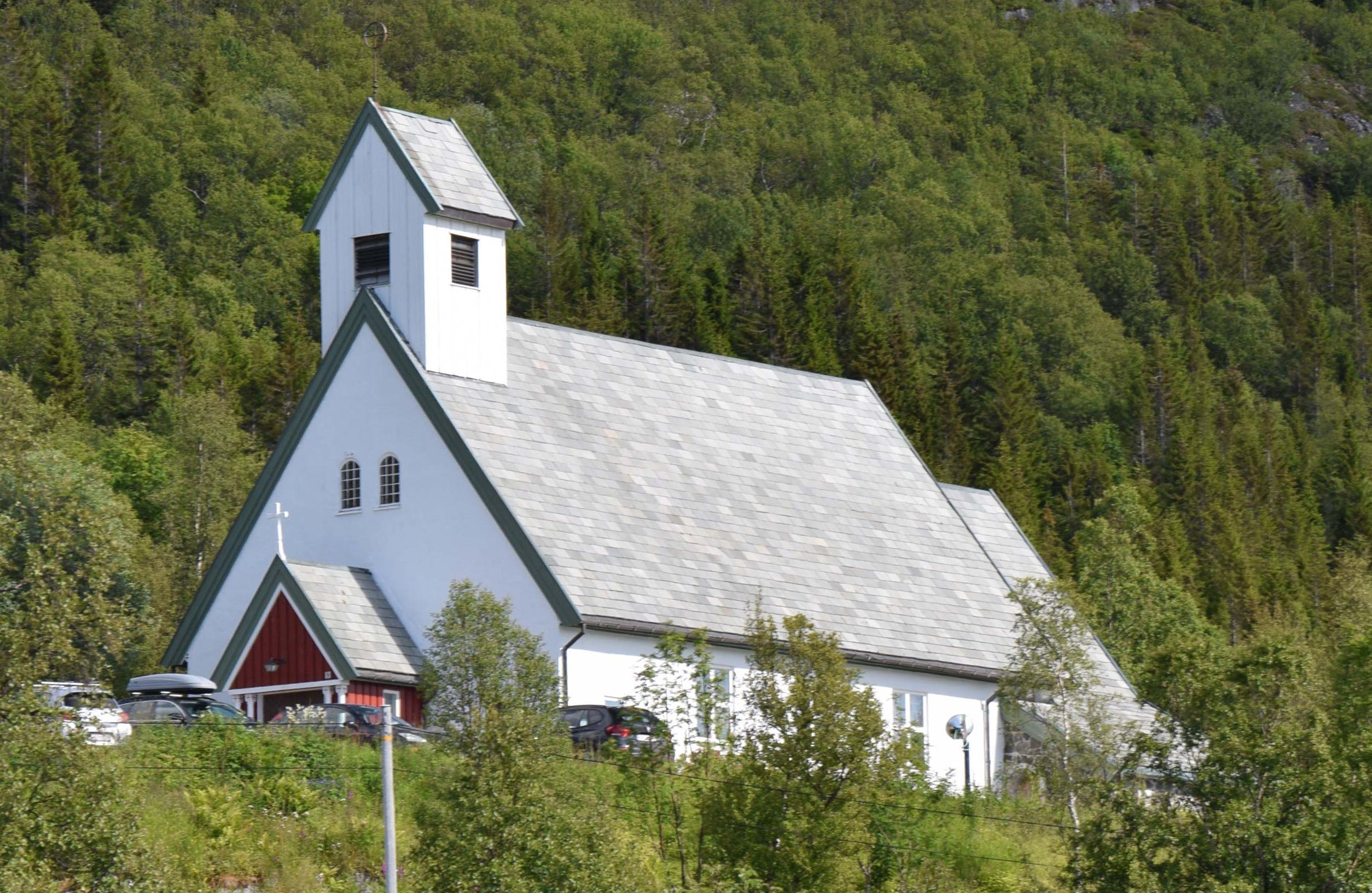

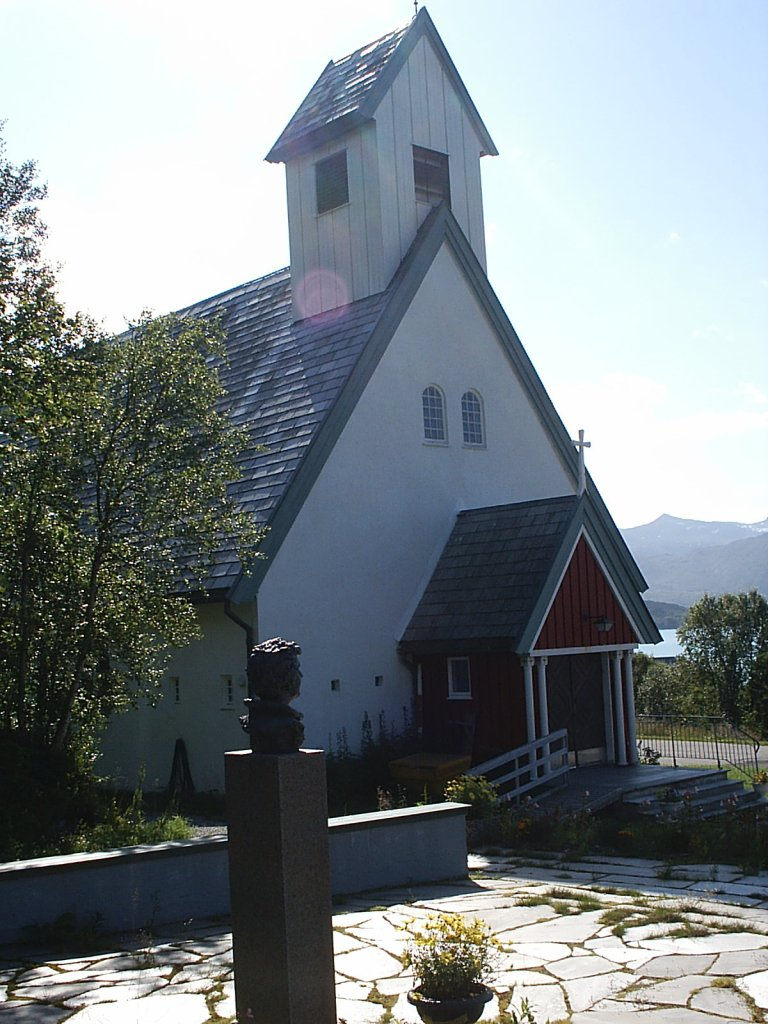

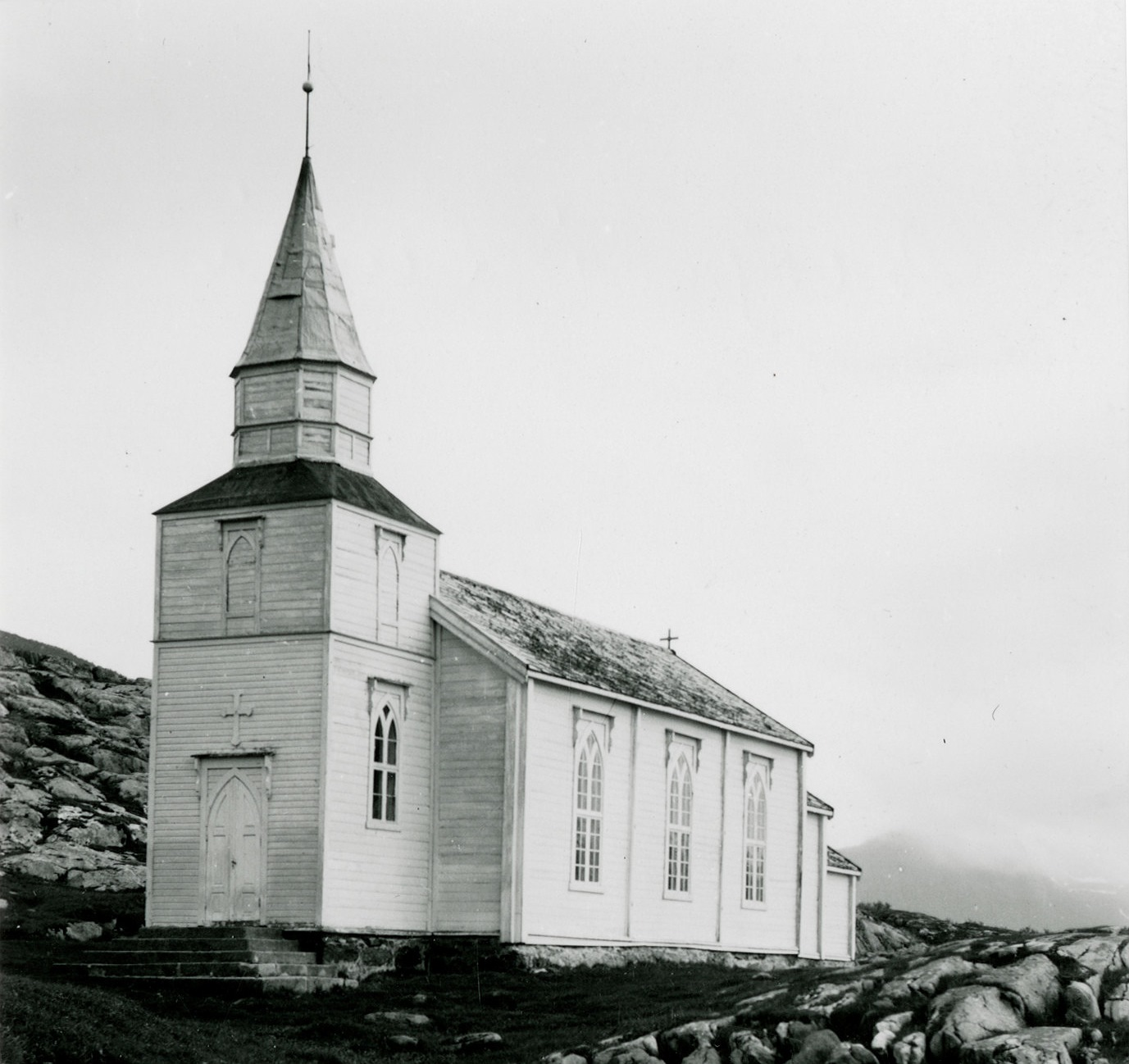
View of the church that stood from 1780 to 1942)

== See also ==
- List of churches in Nord-Hålogaland
