= Medfjorden =

Fjord in Troms county, Norway

Medfjorden (Norwegian); Midafierda (Northern Sami)
- Mefjorden (unofficial spelling)
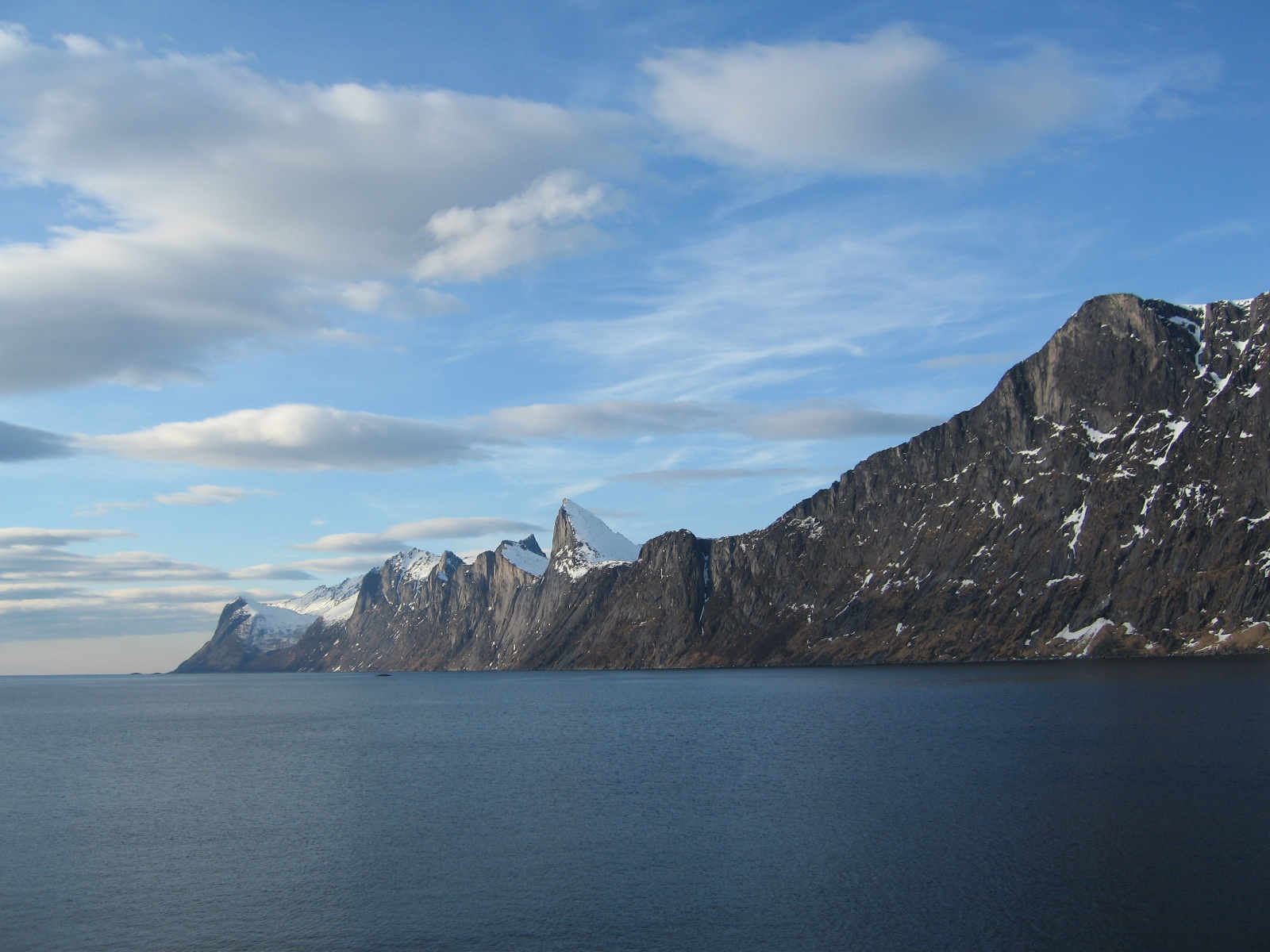
- View of the fjord
- Interactive map of the fjord
- Location: Troms county, Norway
- Coordinates: 69.5097°N 17.5338°E
- Type: Fjord
- Basin countries: Norway
- Max. length: 16 kilometres (9.9 mi)

Medfjorden (Norwegian) or Midafierda (Northern Sami) is a fjord in Senja Municipality in Troms county, Norway. The 16-kilometre (9.9 mi) long fjord cuts into the large island of Senja from northwest. The villages of Mefjordvær and Senjahopen are located at the southern side of the fjord, and at the innermost point in the fjord is the village of Medfjordbotn.
