= Ersfjorden =

Fjord in Senja, Norway

Coordinates: 69.5119°N 17.2993°E

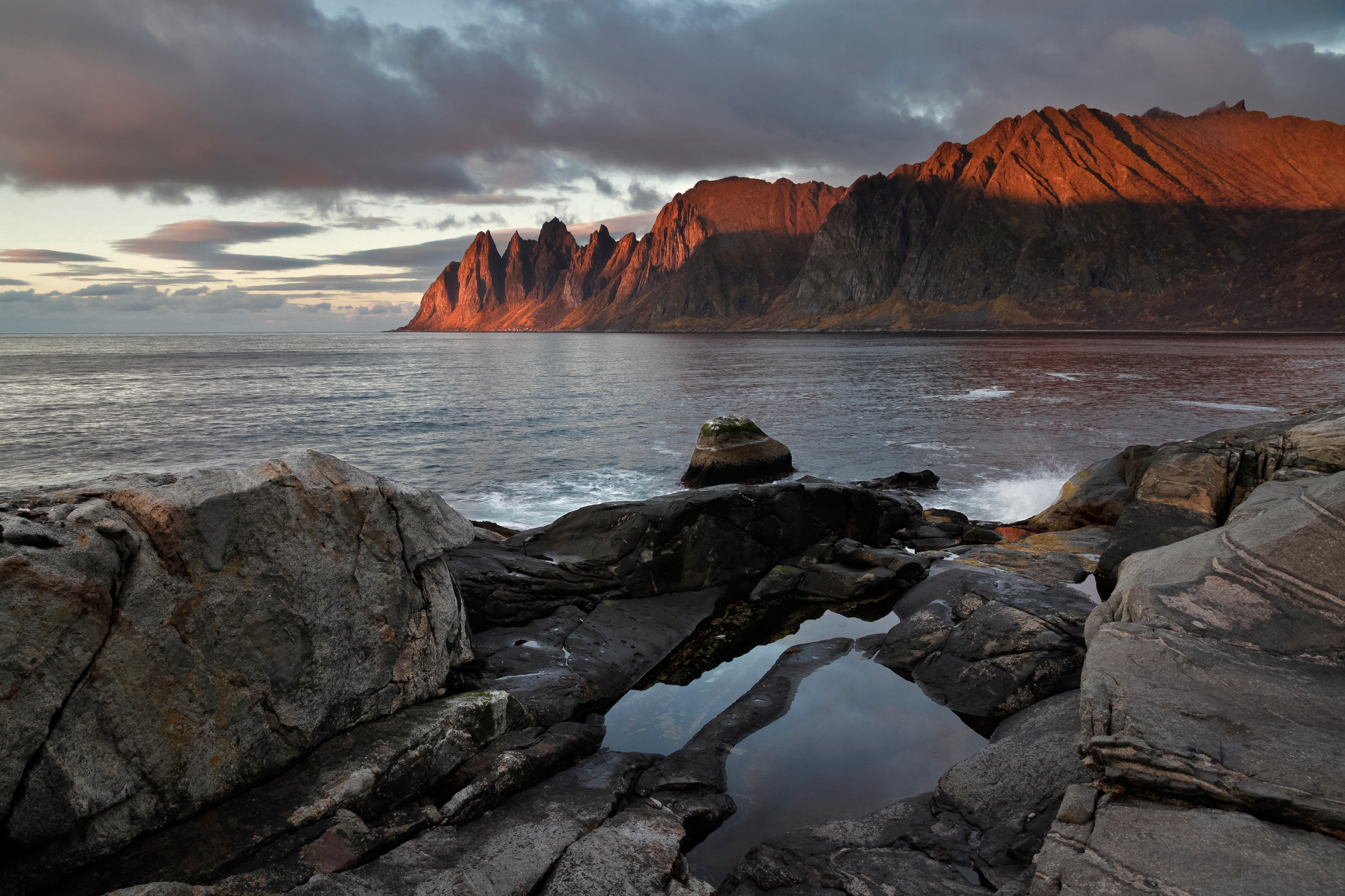
Ersfjorden

Ersfjorden is a fjord in the Senja municipality of Norway. It is 12.5 kilometers long and begins on the western side of Kvaløya.
