= Tranøy Municipality =

Former municipality in Troms, Norway

Tranøy Municipality Tranøy kommune Ránáidsullo suohkan (Northern Sami)
- Former municipality
- Tranø herred (historic name)
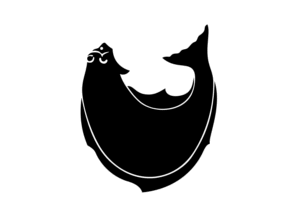
- Flag Coat of arms

- Troms within Norway

- Tranøy within Troms
- Coordinates: 69°11′29″N 17°21′44″E
- Country: Norway
- County: Troms
- District: Midt-Troms
- Established: 1 Jan 1838
  - Created as: Formannskapsdistrikt
- Disestablished: 1 Jan 2020
  - Succeeded by: Senja Municipality
- Administrative centre: Vangsvik

Government
  - Mayor (2015-2019): Jan Fredrik Jenssen (H)

Area (upon dissolution)
  - Total: 523.90 km^{2} (202.28 sq mi)
  - Land: 499.30 km^{2} (192.78 sq mi)
  - Water: 24.60 km^{2} (9.50 sq mi) 4.7%
  - Rank: #204 in Norway
- Highest elevation: 898.6 m (2,948 ft)

Population (2019)
  - Total: 1,513
  - Rank: #352 in Norway
  - Density: 2.9/km^{2} (7.5/sq mi)
  - Change (10 years): ▼ −1.6%
- Demonym: Tranøyværing

Official language
  - Norwegian form: Neutral
- Time zone: UTC+01:00 (CET)
  - Summer (DST): UTC+02:00 (CEST)
- ISO 3166 code: NO-1927

Tranøy (Northern Sami: Ránáidsullo suohkan) is a former municipality in Troms county, Norway. The municipality was situated on the southern coast of the large island of Senja. The municipality existed from 1838 until its dissolution in 2020 when it was merged into the new Senja Municipality. The administrative centre was the village of Vangsvik in the eastern part of the municipality. Other important villages included Stonglandseidet, Skrollsvika, and Å.

Prior to its dissolution in 2020, the 524-square-kilometre (202 sq mi) municipality was the 204th largest by area out of the 422 municipalities in Norway. Tranøy Municipality was also the 352nd most populous municipality in Norway with a population of 1,513. The municipality's population density was 2.9 inhabitants per square kilometre (7.5/sq mi) and its population has decreased by 1.6% over the previous decade.

The nearly-abandoned island of Tranøya, with the 18th-century wooden Tranøy Church, used to be the centre of activities for the municipality. From Tranøybotn it is only a short walk to the Ånderdalen National Park, with varied landscapes within a very limited area, including deep pine forests.

== General information ==
The parish of Tranøy was established as a municipality on 1 January 1838 (see formannskapsdistrikt law). The original municipality included all the land surrounding the large Solbergfjorden. On 1 September 1886, the municipality was divided into three separate municipalities: Tranøy Municipality (population: 1,239) on the west, Dyrøy Municipality (population: 1,281) in the south, and Sørreisa Municipality (population: 1,361) in the east.

During the 1960s, there were many municipal mergers across Norway due to the work of the Schei Committee. On 1 January 1964 several changes took place:

- The mainland areas of Tranøy (population: 382) were transferred to Dyrøy Municipality.
- The Hellemo, Paulsrud, Johnsgård, and Stormo farms of Tranøy (population: 106) were transferred to Lenvik Municipality.
- The parts of Bjarkøy Municipality on the island of Senja and Lemmingsvær islands (population: 480) were transferred to Tranøy Municipality.
- The Rødsand area of Torsken Municipality (population: 160) was also transferred to Tranøy Municipality.

In March 2017, the Parliament of Norway voted to merge Berg Municipality, Torsken Municipality, Lenvik Municipality, and Tranøy Municipality. The new municipality would encompass the whole island of Senja plus part of the mainland located between the Gisundet strait and the Malangen fjord. On 1 January 2020, Tranøy Municipality ceased to exist when it became part of the new Senja Municipality.

=== Name ===
The municipality (originally the parish) is named after the small island of Tranøya (Old Norse: Tranøiar) since the first Tranøy Church was built there. The first element is trana which means "crane". The last element is øy which means "island". Historically, the name of the municipality was spelled Tranø. On 6 January 1908, a royal resolution changed the spelling of the name of the municipality to Tranøy, to give the name a more Norwegian and less Danish spelling due to Norwegian language reforms.

=== Coat of arms ===
The coat of arms was granted on 15 May 1987. The official blazon is "Argent, a flounder embowed reversed sable" (Norwegian: I sølv en krummet svart kveite). This means the arms have a field (background) that has a tincture of argent which means it is commonly colored white, but if it is made out of metal, then silver is used. The charge is an Atlantic halibut (Hippoglossus hippoglossus) that is curved like a U-shaped arch facing upwards. The fish is a main species of local fish, which symbolizes the importance of fishing for the local community. In addition to this, the fish has played a major role in local legends, similar to the role of bears in land-based legends. The arms were designed by Svein A. Berntsen.

=== Churches ===
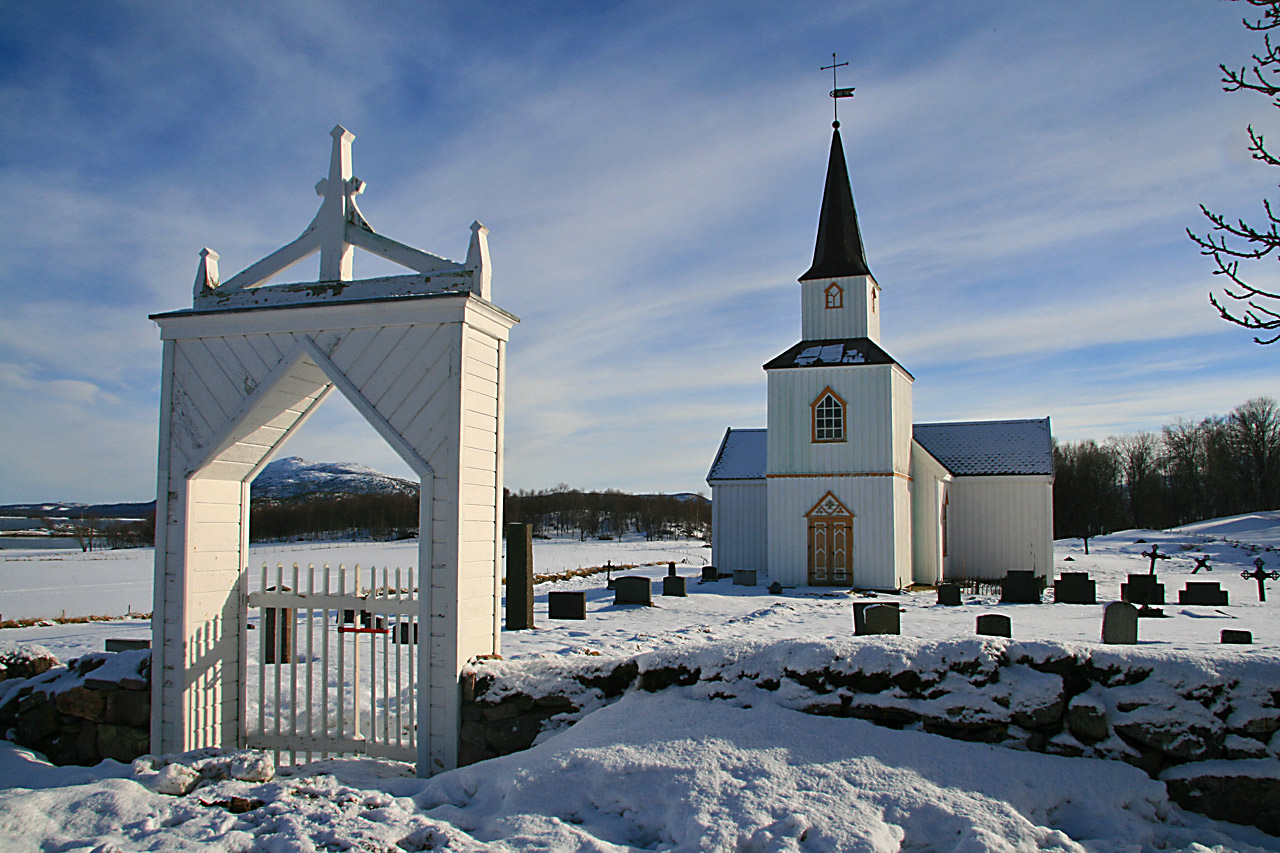
View of Tranøy Church

The Church of Norway had one parish (sokn) within Tranøy Municipality. It was part of the Senja prosti (deanery) in the Diocese of Nord-Hålogaland.

Churches in Tranøy Municipality
| Parish (sokn) | Church name | Location of the church | Year built |
|---|---|---|---|
| Tranøy | Stonglandet Church | Stonglandseidet | 1896 |
| Tranøy | Tranøy Church | Tranøya | 1775 |
| Tranøy | Skrolsvik Chapel | Skrollsvika | 1924 |
| Tranøy | Vangsvik Chapel | Vangsvik | 1975 |

== Geography ==
The municipality of Tranøy was located on the southern end of the large island of Senja. The Andfjorden, Vågsfjorden, and Solbergfjorden surrounded the municipality to the west, south, and southeast. The neighboring Torsken Municipality and Berg Municipality were located to the north and Lenvik Municipality was to the east. Ånderdalen National Park was located in the northwestern part of the municipality. The highest point in the municipality was the 898.6-metre (2,948 ft) tall mountain Tredjefjellet.

=== Climate ===
Climate data for Vangsvika
| Month | Jan | Feb | Mar | Apr | May | Jun | Jul | Aug | Sep | Oct | Nov | Dec | Year |
|---|---|---|---|---|---|---|---|---|---|---|---|---|---|
| Daily mean °C (°F) | −3.9 (25.0) | −3.8 (25.2) | −2.0 (28.4) | 1.2 (34.2) | 5.7 (42.3) | 10.0 (50.0) | 12.5 (54.5) | 11.6 (52.9) | 7.5 (45.5) | 3.5 (38.3) | −0.4 (31.3) | −2.8 (27.0) | 3.3 (37.9) |
| Average precipitation mm (inches) | 106 (4.2) | 95 (3.7) | 76 (3.0) | 65 (2.6) | 45 (1.8) | 53 (2.1) | 67 (2.6) | 75 (3.0) | 100 (3.9) | 137 (5.4) | 117 (4.6) | 114 (4.5) | 1,050 (41.3) |
Source: Norwegian Meteorological Institute

== Government ==
While it existed, Tranøy Municipality was responsible for primary education (through 10th grade), outpatient health services, senior citizen services, welfare and other social services, zoning, economic development, and municipal roads and utilities. The municipality was governed by a municipal council of directly elected representatives. The mayor was indirectly elected by a vote of the municipal council. The municipality was under the jurisdiction of the Senja District Court and the Hålogaland Court of Appeal.

=== Municipal council ===
The municipal council (Kommunestyre) of Tranøy Municipality was made up of 17 representatives that were elected to four year terms. The tables below show the historical composition of the council by political party.

Tranøy kommunestyre 2015–2019
| Party name (in Norwegian) | Number of representatives |
|---|---|
| Labour Party (Arbeiderpartiet) | 6 |
| Progress Party (Fremskrittspartiet) | 1 |
| Conservative Party (Høyre) | 4 |
| Centre Party (Senterpartiet) | 2 |
| Socialist Left Party (Sosialistisk Venstreparti) | 1 |
| Tranøy Local List (Tranøy Folkeliste) | 2 |
| Total number of members: | 17 |
Note: On 1 January 2020, Tranøy Municipality became part of Senja Municipality.

Tranøy kommunestyre 2011–2015
| Party name (in Norwegian) | Number of representatives |
|---|---|
| Labour Party (Arbeiderpartiet) | 6 |
| Progress Party (Fremskrittspartiet) | 1 |
| Conservative Party (Høyre) | 3 |
| Centre Party (Senterpartiet) | 2 |
| Socialist Left Party (Sosialistisk Venstreparti) | 1 |
| Liberal Party (Venstre) | 1 |
| Tranøy People's List (Tranøy Folkeliste) | 3 |
| Total number of members: | 17 |

Tranøy kommunestyre 2007–2011
| Party name (in Norwegian) | Number of representatives |
|---|---|
| Labour Party (Arbeiderpartiet) | 7 |
| Progress Party (Fremskrittspartiet) | 2 |
| Conservative Party (Høyre) | 1 |
| Centre Party (Senterpartiet) | 4 |
| Socialist Left Party (Sosialistisk Venstreparti) | 2 |
| Liberal Party (Venstre) | 1 |
| Total number of members: | 17 |

Tranøy kommunestyre 2003–2007
| Party name (in Norwegian) | Number of representatives |
|---|---|
| Labour Party (Arbeiderpartiet) | 6 |
| Progress Party (Fremskrittspartiet) | 2 |
| Conservative Party (Høyre) | 1 |
| Christian Democratic Party (Kristelig Folkeparti) | 1 |
| Centre Party (Senterpartiet) | 4 |
| Socialist Left Party (Sosialistisk Venstreparti) | 2 |
| Liberal Party (Venstre) | 1 |
| Total number of members: | 17 |

Tranøy kommunestyre 1999–2003
| Party name (in Norwegian) | Number of representatives |
|---|---|
| Labour Party (Arbeiderpartiet) | 9 |
| Progress Party (Fremskrittspartiet) | 1 |
| Conservative Party (Høyre) | 2 |
| Christian Democratic Party (Kristelig Folkeparti) | 1 |
| Centre Party (Senterpartiet) | 4 |
| Socialist Left Party (Sosialistisk Venstreparti) | 1 |
| Solli local list (Solli bygdelags liste) | 1 |
| South Tranøy cross-party list (Sør-Tranøy Tverrpolitiske liste) | 1 |
| Tranøy common list (Tranøy fellesliste) | 1 |
| Total number of members: | 21 |

Tranøy kommunestyre 1995–1999
| Party name (in Norwegian) | Number of representatives |
|---|---|
| Labour Party (Arbeiderpartiet) | 10 |
| Conservative Party (Høyre) | 2 |
| Christian Democratic Party (Kristelig Folkeparti) | 1 |
| Centre Party (Senterpartiet) | 4 |
| Socialist Left Party (Sosialistisk Venstreparti) | 1 |
| Tranøy common list (Tranøy Fellesliste) | 3 |
| Total number of members: | 21 |

Tranøy kommunestyre 1991–1995
| Party name (in Norwegian) | Number of representatives |
|---|---|
| Labour Party (Arbeiderpartiet) | 11 |
| Conservative Party (Høyre) | 1 |
| Christian Democratic Party (Kristelig Folkeparti) | 1 |
| Centre Party (Senterpartiet) | 3 |
| Socialist Left Party (Sosialistisk Venstreparti) | 1 |
| Tranøy Social Democrat Common List (Tranøy Sosialdemokratiske Fellesliste) | 4 |
| Total number of members: | 21 |

Tranøy kommunestyre 1987–1991
| Party name (in Norwegian) | Number of representatives |
|---|---|
| Labour Party (Arbeiderpartiet) | 10 |
| Conservative Party (Høyre) | 1 |
| Christian Democratic Party (Kristelig Folkeparti) | 1 |
| Centre Party (Senterpartiet) | 3 |
| Tranøy social democrat common list (Tranøy sosialdemokratisk fellesliste) | 5 |
| Rødsand cross-party local list (Rødsand tverrpolitisk bygdeliste) | 1 |
| Total number of members: | 21 |

Tranøy kommunestyre 1983–1987
| Party name (in Norwegian) | Number of representatives |
|---|---|
| Labour Party (Arbeiderpartiet) | 14 |
| Conservative Party (Høyre) | 2 |
| Christian Democratic Party (Kristelig Folkeparti) | 1 |
| Centre Party (Senterpartiet) | 3 |
| Rødsand cross-party local list (Rødsand tverrpolitisk bygdeliste) | 1 |
| Total number of members: | 21 |

Tranøy kommunestyre 1979–1983
| Party name (in Norwegian) | Number of representatives |
|---|---|
| Labour Party (Arbeiderpartiet) | 13 |
| Conservative Party (Høyre) | 2 |
| Christian Democratic Party (Kristelig Folkeparti) | 1 |
| Centre Party (Senterpartiet) | 3 |
| Non-party local list for Å (Upolitisk bygdeliste for Å) | 1 |
| Rødsand non-party local list (Rødsand upolitiske bygdeliste) | 1 |
| Total number of members: | 21 |

Tranøy kommunestyre 1975–1979
| Party name (in Norwegian) | Number of representatives |
|---|---|
| Labour Party (Arbeiderpartiet) | 12 |
| Centre Party (Senterpartiet) | 5 |
| Socialist Left Party (Sosialistisk Venstreparti) | 1 |
| Vikstranda non-party list (Vikstranda Upolitiske Liste) | 1 |
| Non-party list for the Å area (Upolitisk Liste for Å Krets) | 1 |
| Rødsand non-party list (Rødsand Upolitiske List) | 1 |
| Total number of members: | 21 |

Tranøy kommunestyre 1971–1975
| Party name (in Norwegian) | Number of representatives |
|---|---|
| Labour Party (Arbeiderpartiet) | 8 |
| Local List(s) (Lokale lister) | 13 |
| Total number of members: | 21 |

Tranøy kommunestyre 1967–1971
| Party name (in Norwegian) | Number of representatives |
|---|---|
| Labour Party (Arbeiderpartiet) | 7 |
| Local List(s) (Lokale lister) | 14 |
| Total number of members: | 21 |

Tranøy kommunestyre 1963–1967
| Party name (in Norwegian) | Number of representatives |
|---|---|
| Labour Party (Arbeiderpartiet) | 6 |
| Local List(s) (Lokale lister) | 15 |
| Total number of members: | 21 |

Tranøy herredsstyre 1959–1963
| Party name (in Norwegian) | Number of representatives |
|---|---|
| Labour Party (Arbeiderpartiet) | 6 |
| List of workers, fishermen, and small farmholders (Arbeidere, fiskere, småbrukere liste) | 7 |
| Local List(s) (Lokale lister) | 4 |
| Total number of members: | 17 |

Tranøy herredsstyre 1955–1959
| Party name (in Norwegian) | Number of representatives |
|---|---|
| Labour Party (Arbeiderpartiet) | 3 |
| Communist Party (Kommunistiske Parti) | 1 |
| List of workers, fishermen, and small farmholders (Arbeidere, fiskere, småbrukere liste) | 1 |
| Local List(s) (Lokale lister) | 7 |
| Total number of members: | 17 |

Tranøy herredsstyre 1951–1955
| Party name (in Norwegian) | Number of representatives |
|---|---|
| Labour Party (Arbeiderpartiet) | 5 |
| Communist Party (Kommunistiske Parti) | 2 |
| Local List(s) (Lokale lister) | 9 |
| Total number of members: | 16 |

Tranøy herredsstyre 1947–1951
| Party name (in Norwegian) | Number of representatives |
|---|---|
| Labour Party (Arbeiderpartiet) | 4 |
| Liberal Party (Venstre) | 2 |
| List of workers, fishermen, and small farmholders (Arbeidere, fiskere, småbrukere liste) | 4 |
| Local List(s) (Lokale lister) | 6 |
| Total number of members: | 16 |

Tranøy herredsstyre 1945–1947
| Party name (in Norwegian) | Number of representatives |
|---|---|
| List of workers, fishermen, and small farmholders (Arbeidere, fiskere, småbrukere liste) | 4 |
| Local List(s) (Lokale lister) | 12 |
| Total number of members: | 16 |

Tranøy herredsstyre 1937–1941*
| Party name (in Norwegian) | Number of representatives |
|---|---|
| Labour Party (Arbeiderpartiet) | 7 |
| Local List(s) (Lokale lister) | 9 |
| Total number of members: | 16 |
Note: Due to the German occupation of Norway during World War II, no elections were held for new municipal councils until after the war ended in 1945.

=== Mayors ===
The mayor (Norwegian: ordfører) of Tranøy Municipality is the political leader of the municipality and the chairperson of the municipal council. Here is a list of people who have held this position:

- 1840–1842: Søren Henrik Jacobsen Tømmervig
- 1843–1845: Knud Moe
- 1846–1846: Rev. Carl Theodor Schmidt
- 1857–1857: Rev. Vilhelm Steenbloch Bugge Frost
- 1873–1873: Jacob Christian Moe
- c.1880–1907: Jørgen Christian Holmboe
- 1911–1912: Fredrik Isaksen
- 1917–1919: Ole Nilsen
- 1919–1929: J. Sivertsen
- 1929–1934: Ole Solbø
- 1934–1942: Oscar Edvardsen (Ap)
- 1943–1945: Oscar Andreassen (NS)
- 1945–1960: Oscar Edvardsen (Ap)
- 1960–1971: Trygve Sollied (Ap)
- 1971–1979: Lyder Johan Nilssen (Ap)
- 1979–1983: Kjell Benjaminsen (Ap)
- 1983–2003: Martin Rolness (Ap)
- 2003–2015: Odd Arne Andreassen (Ap)
- 2015–2019: Jan Fredrik Jenssen (H)

== See also ==
- List of former municipalities of Norway
