= Dyrøya =

Dyrøya or Dyrøy (Norwegian: Animal Island) may refer to several places:

== Norway ==
=== Møre og Romsdal ===
- Dyrøya, Ålesund, an island in Ålesund Municipality (formerly in Skodje Municipality)
- Dyrøya, Smøla, an island in Smøla Municipality

=== Nordland ===
- Dyrøya, Lurøy, an island in Lurøy Municipality
- Dyrøya, Øksnes, an island in Øksnes Municipality

=== Rogaland ===
- Dyrøya, Rogaland, an island in Eigersund Municipality

=== Troms ===
- Dyrøy Municipality, a municipality in Troms county
- Dyrøya, Troms, an island within Dyrøy Municipality

=== Trøndelag ===
- Nord-Dyrøya, an island in Nærøysund Municipality (formerly in Vikna Municipality)
- Sør-Dyrøya, an island in Nærøysund Municipality (formerly in Vikna Municipality)

=== Vestland ===
- Dyrøya, Alver, an island in Alver Municipality (formerly in Radøy Municipality)
- Dyrøya, Bømlo, an island in Bømlo Municipality
- Dyrøya, Masfjorden, an island in Masfjorden Municipality
