= Tranøy =

Tranøy or Tranøya may refer to:

== People ==
- Knut Erik Tranøy (1918–2012), a Norwegian philosopher
- Torstein Tranøy (1964–2009), a Norwegian journalist and writer

== Places ==
=== Norway ===
- Tranøy Municipality, a former municipality in Troms county, Norway
- Tranøy, Hamarøy, a village in Hamarøy municipality in Nordland county, Norway
- Tranøy Church, a historic parish church on the island of Tranøya in Senja municipality, Troms county, Norway
- Tranøy Lighthouse, a lighthouse in Hamarøy municipality, Nordland county, Norway

==== Islands ====
- Tranøya (Alstahaug), an island in Alstahaug Municipality in Nordland county, Norway
- Tranøya (Dønna), an island in Dønna Municipality in Nordland county, Norway
- Tranøya (Lurøy), an island in Lurøy Municipality in Nordland county, Norway
- Tranøya (Møre og Romsdal), an island in Smøla Municipality in Møre og Romsdal county, Norway
- Tranøya (Troms), an island in Senja Municipality in Troms county, Norway
- Tranøya (Rogaland), an island in Fitjar Municipality in Rogaland county, Norway
