= Blåtinden =

Blåtinden is the name of many mountains in Norway:

- Blåtinden, Dyrøya (562 metres or 1,844 feet), on the island of Dyrøya in Øksnes Municipality
- Blåtinden, Hareidlandet (697 metres or 2,287 feet), on the island of Hareidlandet in Ulstein Municipality
- Blåtinden, Målselv (1,378 metres or 4,521 feet), in Målselv Municipality
- Blåtinden, Fjord (1,664 metres or 5,459 feet), in Fjord Municipality
- Blåtinden, Uløya (1,142 metres or 3,747 feet), on the border of Skjervøy Municipality and Nordreisa Municipality
- Blåtinden, Vestnes (1,166 metres or 3,825 feet), in Vestnes Municipality
