= Vangsvik =

Village in Senja Municipality, Norway

Vangsvik / Vangsvika
- Village
- Interactive map of Vangsvik / Vangsvika
- Location within Troms Location within Norway
- Coordinates: 69°10′14″N 17°44′02″E
- Country: Norway
- Region: Northern Norway
- County: Troms
- District: Midt-Troms
- Municipality: Senja Municipality

Area
  - Total: 0.4 km^{2} (0.15 sq mi)
- Elevation: 20 m (66 ft)

Population (2023)
  - Total: 276
  - Density: 690/km^{2} (1,800/sq mi)
- Time zone: UTC+01:00 (CET)
  - Summer (DST): UTC+02:00 (CEST)
- Post Code: 9304 Vangsvik

Vangsvik or Vangsvika is a village in Senja Municipality in Troms county, Norway. The village has a population of about 350. The village has a school, Vangsvik Chapel, store, and medical office. There is also a large fish farming facility nearby. The Senja Rutebil (bus company) has its headquarters in Vangsvik. The village was the administrative centre of the old Tranøy Municipality until 1 January 2020 when it was merged into Senja Municipality.

Vangsvik is located on the south side of the island of Senja, along the Solbergfjorden. It is about 15 km (9.3 mi) southwest of the town of Finnsnes. Vangsvik is also about 32 km (20 mi) northeast of the village of Stonglandseidet and about 40 km (25 mi) from the village of Å.

The 0.4-square-kilometre (99-acre) village has a population (2023) of 276 and a population density of 690 inhabitants per square kilometre (1,800/sq mi).
