= Brøstadbotn =

Village in Dyrøy Municipality, Norway

- Village
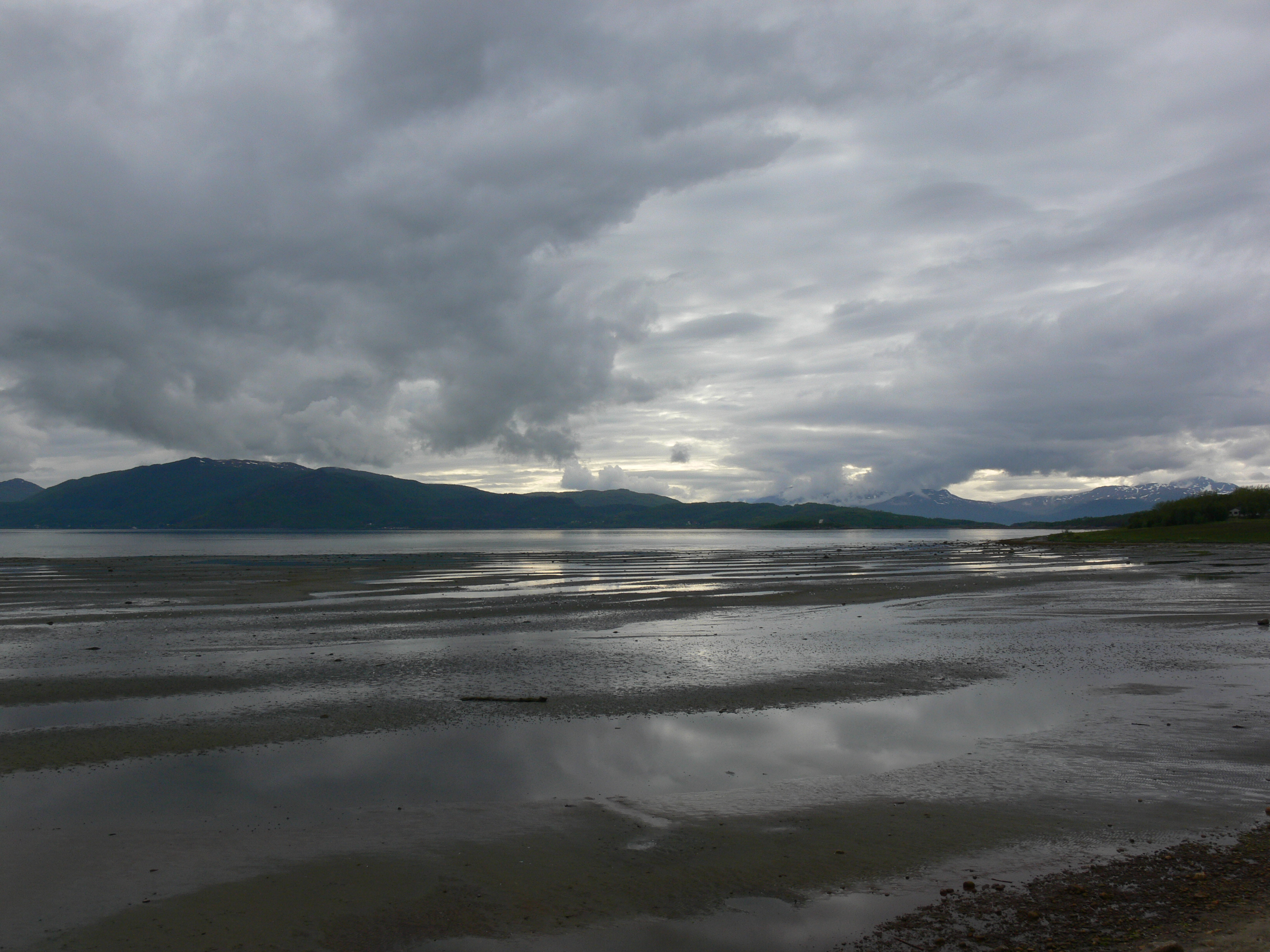
- Interactive map of Brøstadbotn
- Location within Troms Location within Norway
- Coordinates: 69°05′18″N 17°41′40″E
- Country: Norway
- Region: Northern Norway
- County: Troms
- District: Midt-Troms
- Municipality: Dyrøy Municipality
- Elevation: 10 m (33 ft)
- Time zone: UTC+01:00 (CET)
  - Summer (DST): UTC+02:00 (CEST)
- Post Code: 9311 Brøstadbotn

Brøstadbotn is the administrative centre of Dyrøy Municipality in Troms county, Norway. The village is located on the mainland of Norway, along the Dyrøysundet strait, looking across the strait at the island of Dyrøya to the southwest. The Dyrøy Bridge is located just west of the village. Brøstad Church is located in the village. One of the main industries for the village is an electronics factory.
