= Tranøy Church =

- Tranøy kirke
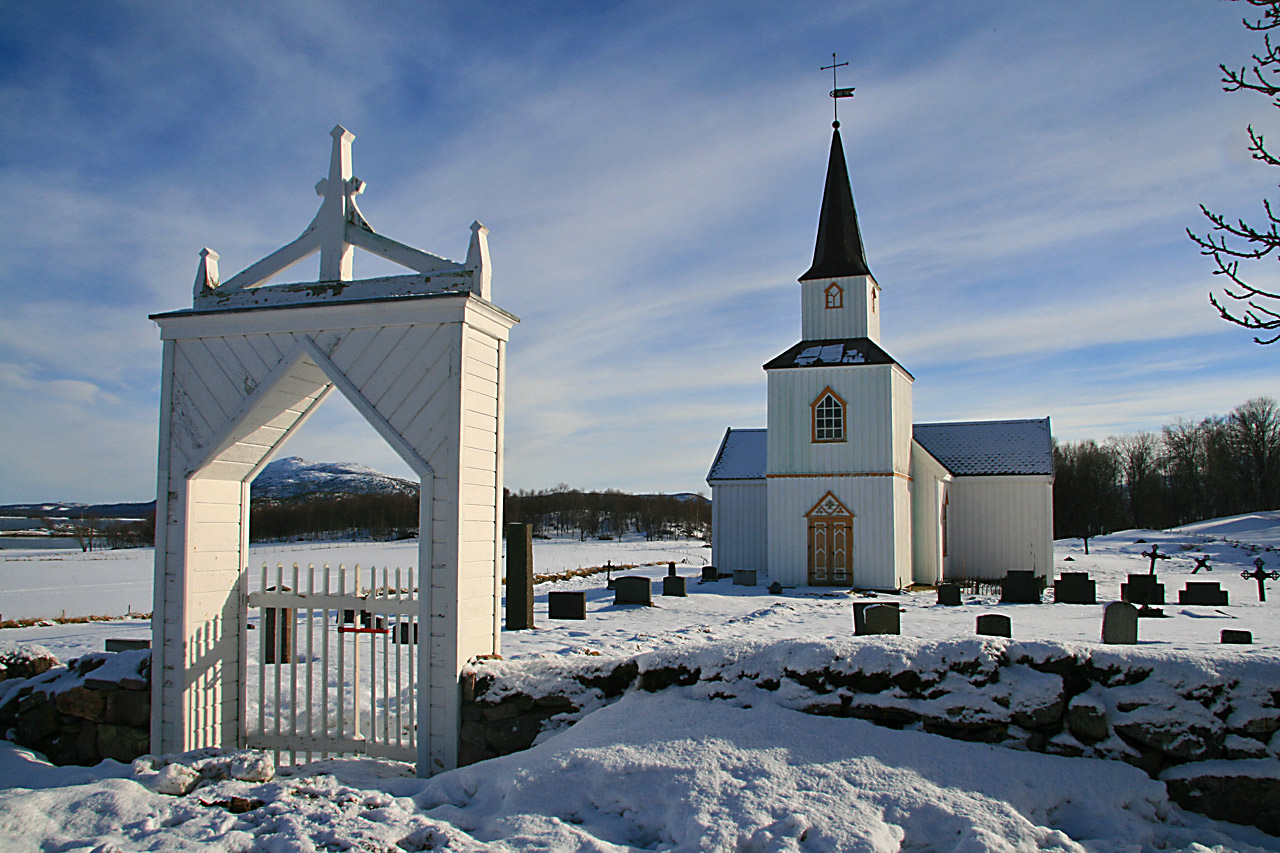
- View of the church
- Tranøy Church
- 69.143963°N 17.442432°E
- Location: Senja Municipality, Troms
- Country: Norway
- Denomination: Church of Norway
- Churchmanship: Evangelical Lutheran

History
- Status: Parish church
- Founded: 13th century
- Consecrated: 1775

Architecture
- Functional status: Historic
- Architectural type: Cruciform
- Completed: 1775 (251 years ago)

Specifications
- Capacity: 210
- Materials: Wood

Administration
- Diocese: Nord-Hålogaland
- Deanery: Senja prosti
- Parish: Tranøy
- Norwegian Cultural Heritage Site
- Type: Church
- Status: Automatically protected
- ID: 85663

Tranøy Church (Norwegian: Tranøy kirke) is a historic parish church of the Church of Norway in Senja Municipality in Troms county, Norway. It is located on the small island of Tranøya, just off the shore of the large island of Senja. It formerly was the main church for the Tranøy parish which is part of the Senja prosti (deanery) in the Diocese of Nord-Hålogaland. The white, wooden church was built in a cruciform style in 1775 by an unknown architect. The church seats about 210 people. The church is no longer used for regular worship services since the island on which it sits is no longer populated, nor does it have a road connection. It is, however, used periodically for special occasions.

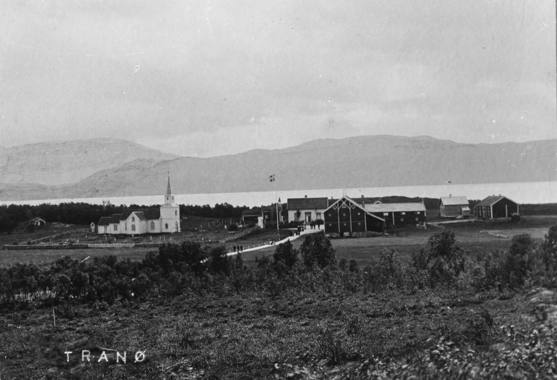
View of the church (c. 1900)

== History ==
The earliest existing historical records of the church date back to the year 1350, but the church was likely built around the 1200s to serve the areas that now make up Tranøy Municipality, Dyrøy Municipality, and Sørreisa Municipality. The second church was likely built around the 1400s. The church had a rectangular nave and a narrower, rectangular chancel as well as a tower. The church had a sod roof. Around the mid-1700s, the nave was expanded by adding two cross arms, giving it a cruciform design. In the 1770s, the church was found to be dilapidated and damaged by moisture due to being located on a "swampy site". In 1775, the old church was torn down and a new church was built on a more suitable site about 90 metres (300 ft) to the south of the old site.

In 1814, this church served as an election church (Norwegian: valgkirke). Together with more than 300 other parish churches across Norway, it was a polling station for elections to the 1814 Norwegian Constituent Assembly which wrote the Constitution of Norway. This was Norway's first national elections. Each church parish was a constituency that elected people called "electors" who later met together in each county to elect the representatives for the assembly that was to meet in Eidsvoll later that year.

This church was the main church for the Tranøy prestegjeld for hundreds of years until 1896 when the new Stonglandet Church was built on the main island of Senja. Today, the island of Tranøya is no longer populated and it does not have a road connection to the rest of the municipality. The church is no longer regularly used other than for special occasions and one worship service each summer. The church and the surrounding farm is part of the Midt-Troms Museum.

== See also ==
- List of churches in Nord-Hålogaland
