= Brøstad Church =

- Brøstad kirke
- Brøstad Church
- 69.078415°N 17.691696°E
- Location: Dyrøy Municipality, Troms
- Country: Norway
- Denomination: Church of Norway
- Churchmanship: Evangelical Lutheran

History
- Former name: Brøstad kapell
- Status: Parish church
- Founded: 1937
- Consecrated: 1937

Architecture
- Functional status: Active
- Architect(s): Bersvend Thoresen Elvevold and Martin Jakobsen
- Architectural type: Long church
- Completed: 1937 (89 years ago)

Specifications
- Capacity: 180
- Materials: Wood

Administration
- Diocese: Nord-Hålogaland
- Deanery: Senja prosti
- Parish: Dyrøy
- Norwegian Cultural Heritage Site
- Type: Church
- Status: Not protected
- ID: 83966

Brøstad Church (Norwegian: Brøstad kirke) is a parish church of the Church of Norway in Dyrøy Municipality in Troms county, Norway. It is located in the village of Brøstadbotn. It is one of the churches for the Dyrøy parish which is part of the Senja prosti (deanery) in the Diocese of Nord-Hålogaland. The white, wooden church was built in a long church style in 1937 using plans drawn up by the architects Bersvend Thoresen Elvevold and Martin Jakobsen. The church seats about 180 people.

== History ==
The church was built and consecrated in 1937. The long church building has a tall tower over the main entrance. The choir is on the northeast end of the building and it is raised up a few steps from the main nave. In 1997, the church was renovated using plans by the architect Ottar Holtermann.

== See also ==
- List of churches in Nord-Hålogaland
