= Holm, Troms =

Village in Dyrøy Municipality, Norway

Holm
- Village
- Interactive map of Holm
- Location within Troms Location within Norway
- Coordinates: 69°02′20.8″N 17°29′38.4″E
- Country: Norway
- Region: Northern Norway
- County: Troms
- District: Midt-Troms
- Municipality: Dyrøy Municipality
- Elevation: 22 m (72 ft)
- Time zone: UTC+01:00 (CET)
  - Summer (DST): UTC+02:00 (CEST)
- Post Code: 9311 Brøstadbotn

Holm is a small village area in Dyrøy Municipality in Troms county, Norway. It is located in the central part of the eastern coast of the island of Dyrøya. Dyrøy Church is located in Holm.
