= Dyrøy Church =

- Dyrøy kirke
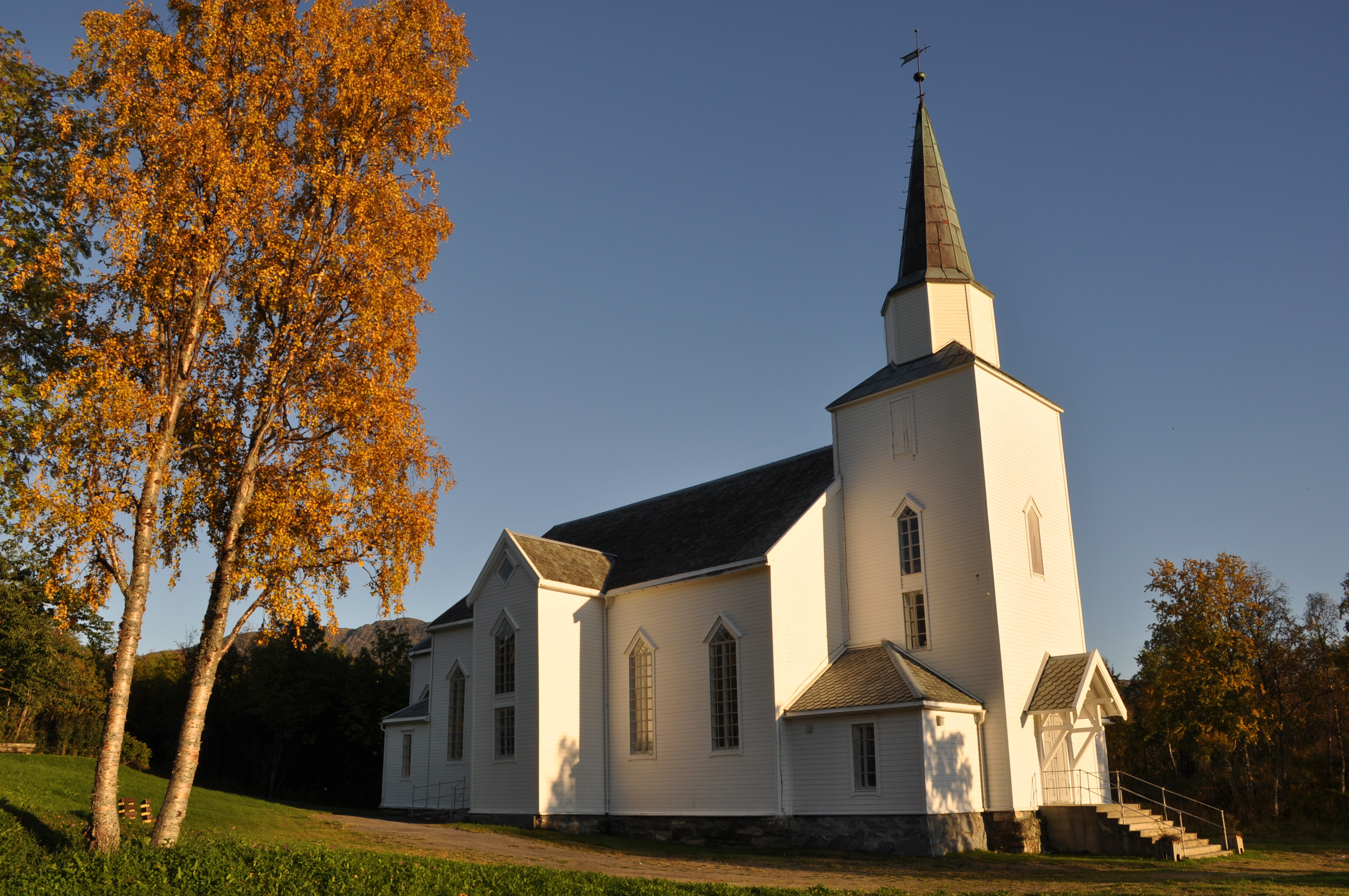
- View of the church
- Dyrøy Church
- 69.038652°N 17.494306°E
- Location: Dyrøy Municipality, Troms
- Country: Norway
- Denomination: Church of Norway
- Churchmanship: Evangelical Lutheran

History
- Status: Parish church
- Founded: c. 1500
- Consecrated: 1880

Architecture
- Functional status: Active
- Architect: Håkon Mosling
- Architectural type: Long church
- Completed: 1880 (146 years ago)

Specifications
- Capacity: 450
- Materials: Wood

Administration
- Diocese: Nord-Hålogaland
- Deanery: Senja prosti
- Parish: Dyrøy
- Norwegian Cultural Heritage Site
- Type: Church
- Status: Not protected
- ID: 84043

Dyrøy Church (Norwegian: Dyrøy kirke) is a parish church of the Church of Norway in Dyrøy Municipality in Troms county, Norway. It is located in the village of Holm on the eastern shore of the island of Dyrøya. It is one of the churches for the Dyrøy parish which is part of the Senja prosti (deanery) in the Diocese of Nord-Hålogaland. The white, wooden church was built in a long church style in 1880 using plans drawn up by the architect Håkon Mosling. The church seats about 450 people.

== History ==
The earliest existing historical records of the church date back to the year 1589, but the church was likely built around the year 1500. The first church was located at Dyrøyhamn, about 4.5 kilometres (2.8 mi) south of the present church site. At that time, the church was sometimes known as Havn kirke since Dyrøyhamn was known as Havn at that time. During an inspection in August 1770, the old church was described as a timber-framed building with a cruciform floor plan with a sod roof. It also had a tower, choir, and sacristy. The church measured about 18 metres (59 ft) long and 12 metres (39 ft) wide. It had a graveyard surrounding the church. At that time, the inspectors found that the church was "miserable and dilapidated" and they recommended a new church be constructed. In 1770, the graveyard was closed. In 1777, a new church was built at Holm about 4.3 kilometres (2.7 mi) further north along the coast of the island. The new building was also a cruciform design and it was consecrated on 9 November 1777. The red church had a small tower and two entrances. In 1778, the old church was auctioned off to Nils Peterson and Jørgen Hansen who took it down and reused its materials.

In 1880, a new long church was built about 60 metres (200 ft) to the northwest of the older church. The new building had a tower on the west end. After the new church was in use, the old church was torn down. The cemetery by the old church is still in use, a short distance from the new church building.

== Media gallery ==
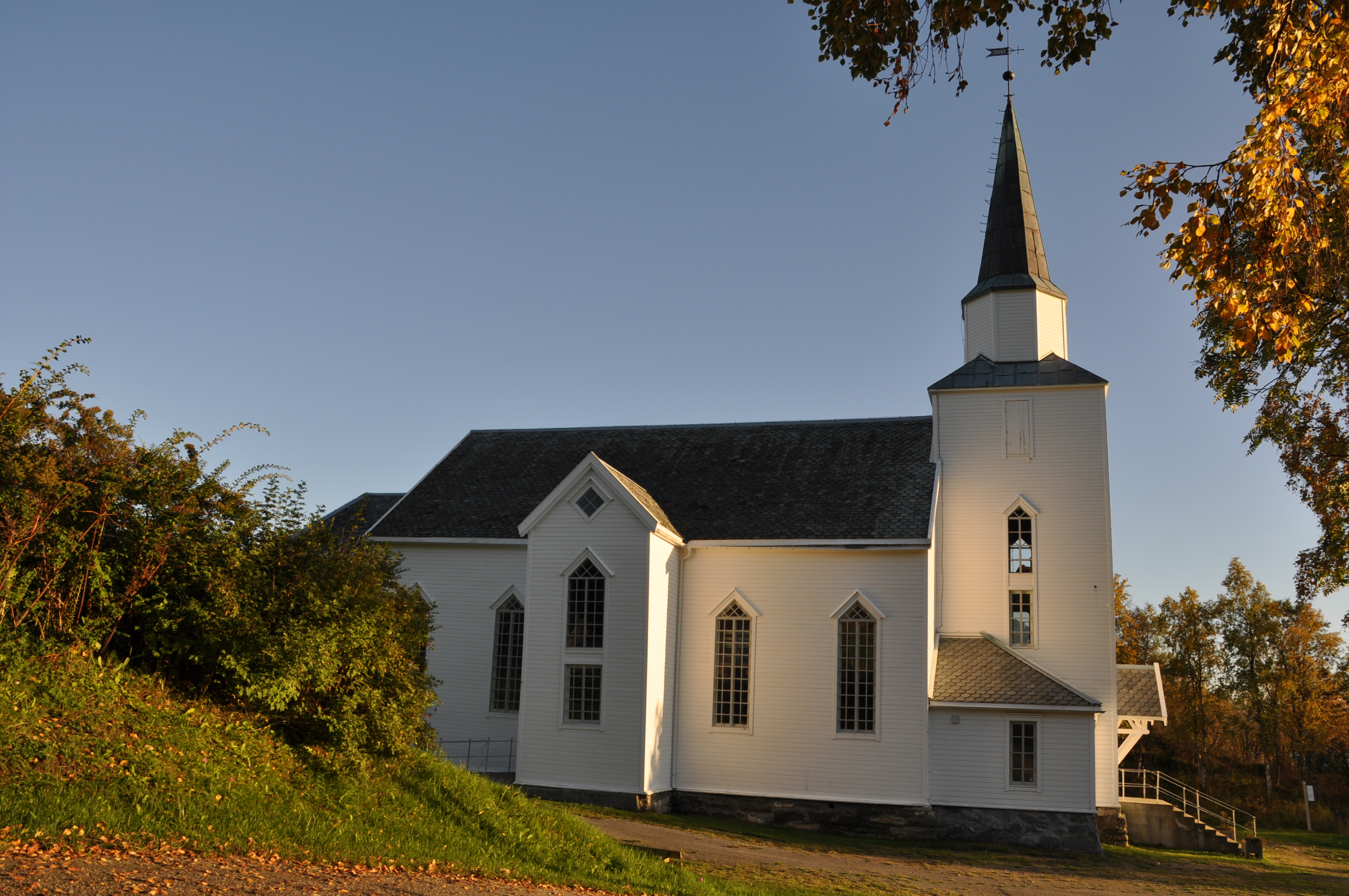

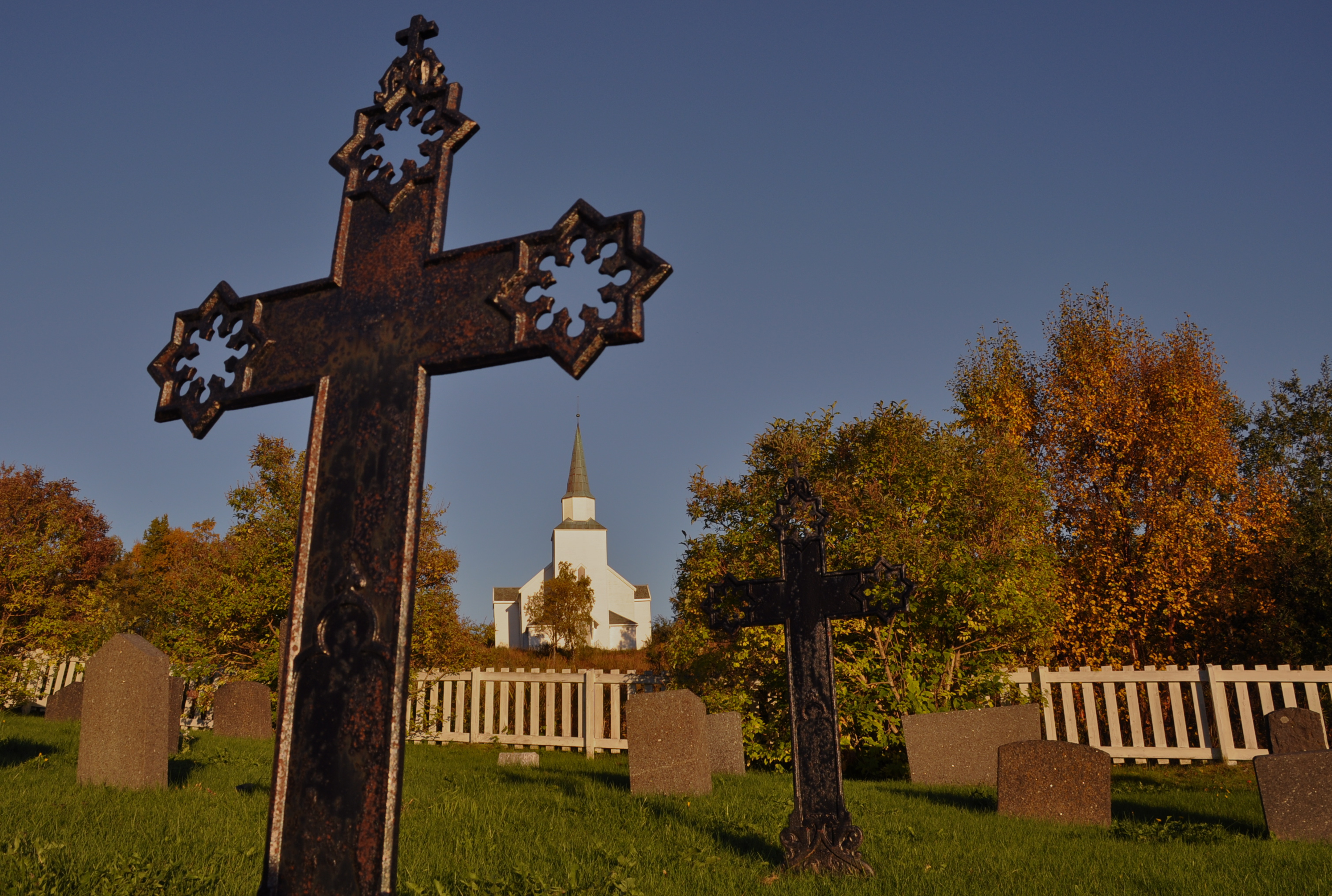

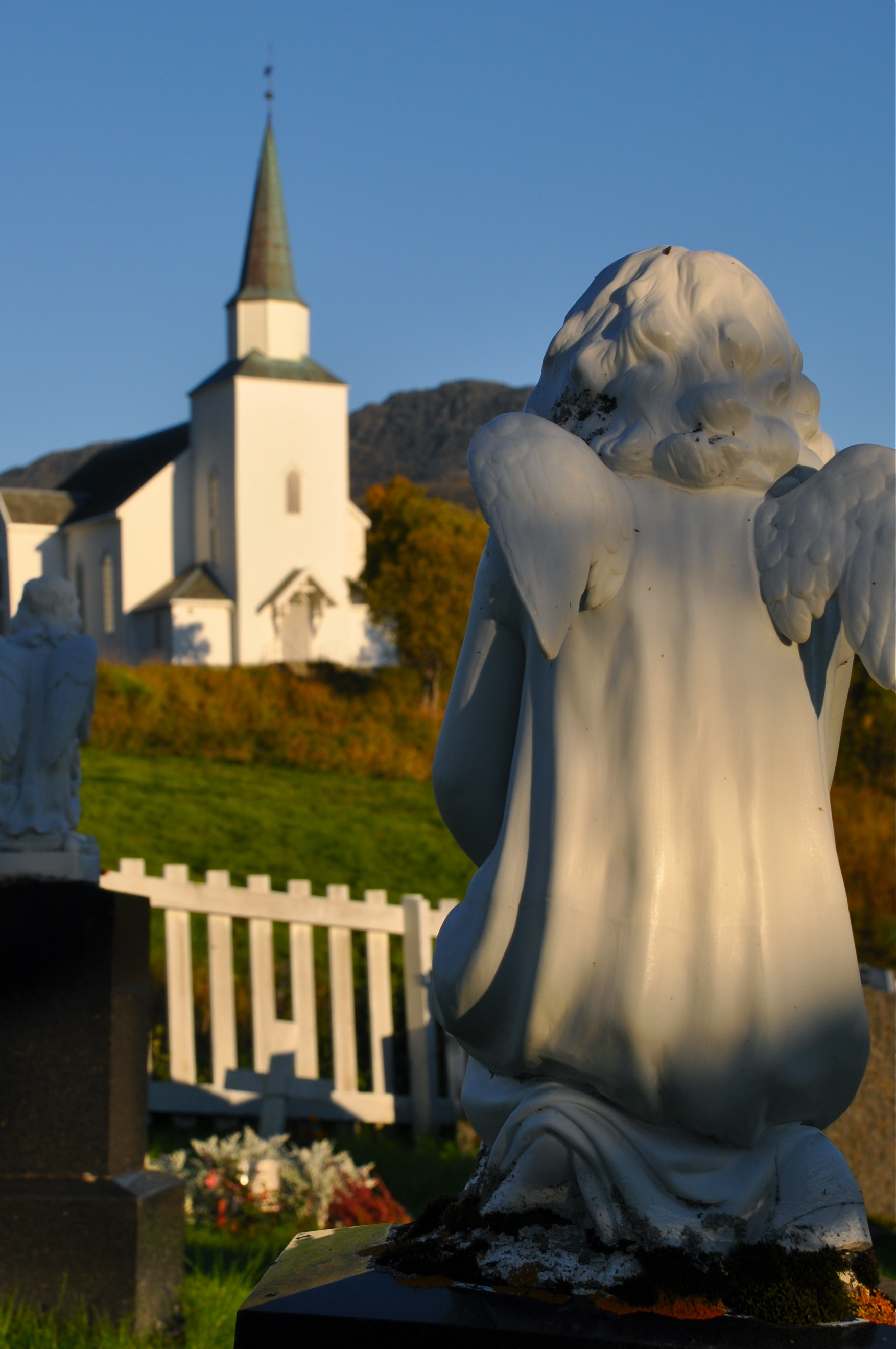

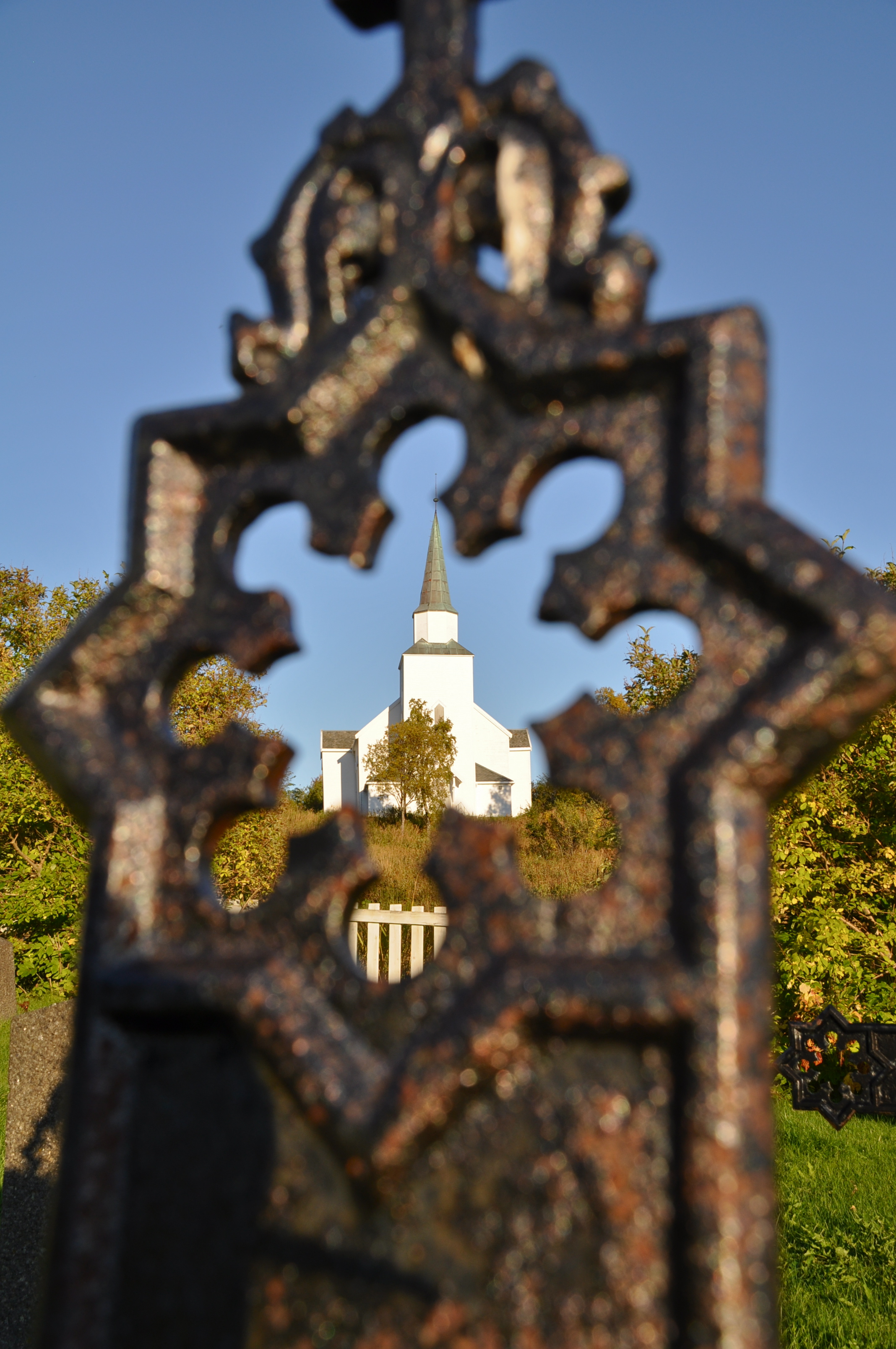

== See also ==
- List of churches in Nord-Hålogaland
