= Skrollsvika =

Village in Senja Municipality, Norway

Skrollsvika Skrolsvik
- Village
- Interactive map of Skrollsvika; Skrolsvik
- Location within Troms Location within Norway
- Coordinates: 69.06409°N 16.81489°E
- Country: Norway
- Region: Northern Norway
- County: Troms
- District: Midt-Troms
- Municipality: Senja Municipality
- Elevation: 8 m (26 ft)
- Time zone: UTC+01:00 (CET)
  - Summer (DST): UTC+02:00 (CEST)
- Post Code: 9392 Stonglandseidet

Skrolsvik or Skrollsvika is a village on the southwestern tip of the island of Senja in Troms county, Norway. The village is located in Senja Municipality, west of the villages of Å and Stonglandseidet. This village has an important ferry connection with the nearby town of Harstad which is located across the Vågsfjorden to the southwest. Skrolsvik Chapel is located in this village.
