= Vangsvik Chapel =

- Vangsvik kapell
- Vangsvik Chapel
- 69.1723424°N 17.755031°E
- Location: Senja Municipality, Troms
- Country: Norway
- Denomination: Church of Norway
- Churchmanship: Evangelical Lutheran

History
- Status: Parish church

Architecture
- Functional status: Active
- Architect: Alf Apalseth
- Architectural type: Fan-shaped
- Completed: 1975 (51 years ago)

Specifications
- Capacity: 150
- Materials: Concrete

Administration
- Diocese: Nord-Hålogaland
- Deanery: Senja prosti
- Parish: Tranøy

Vangsvik Chapel (Norwegian: Vangsvik kapell) is a parish church of the Church of Norway in Senja Municipality in the village of Vangsvik, Troms county, Norway. It is one of the churches for the Tranøy parish which is part of the Senja prosti (deanery) in the Diocese of Nord-Hålogaland. The concrete church was built in a fan-shaped design in 1975 using plans drawn up by the architect Alf Apalseth. The church seats about 150 people.

== See also ==
- List of churches in Nord-Hålogaland
