= Dyrøya, Troms =

Island in Troms, Norway

Dyrøya (Norwegian); Divrrát (Northern Sami)
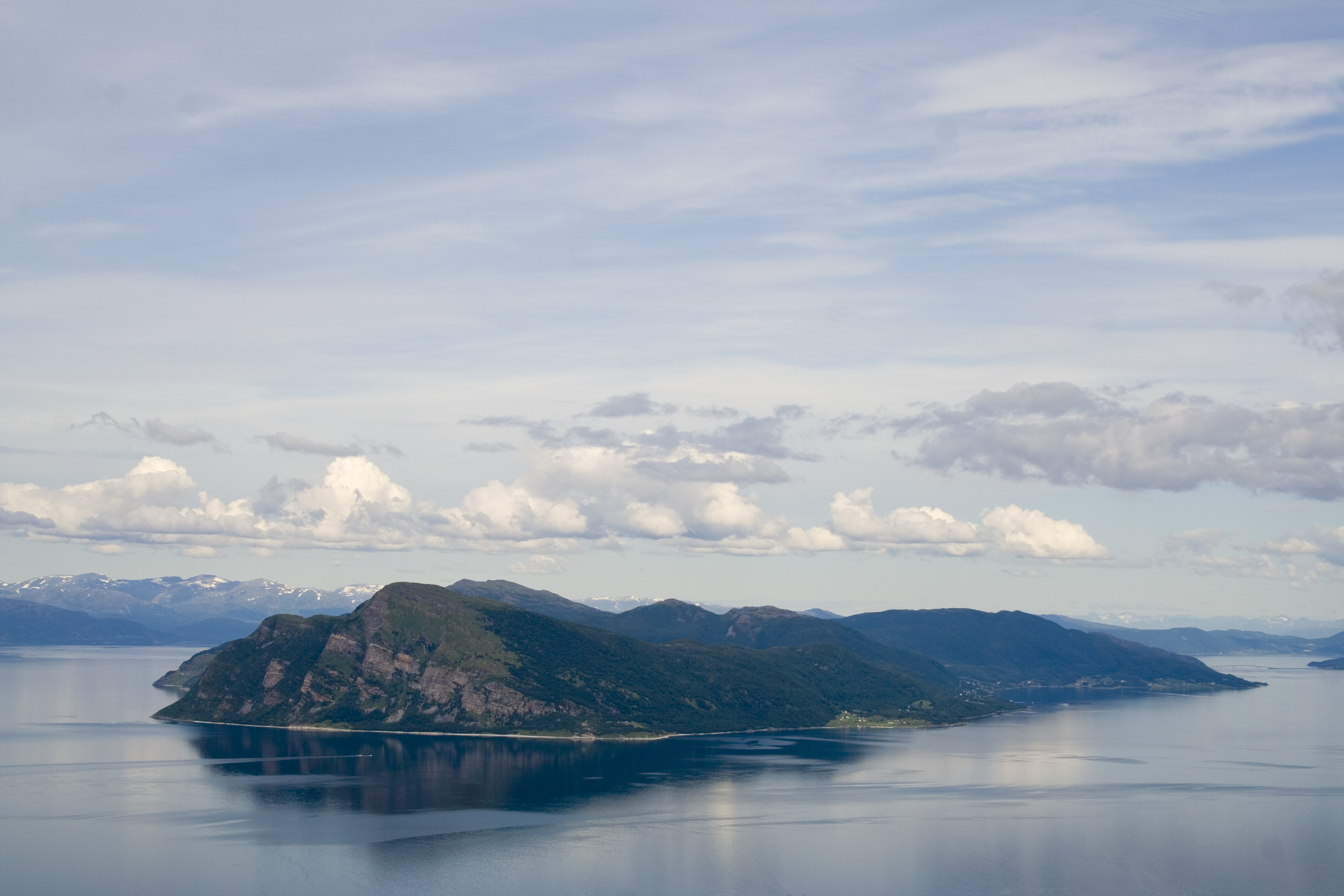
- View of the island
- Interactive map of: Dyrøya (Norwegian); Divrrát (Northern Sami)

Geography
- Location: Troms, Norway
- Coordinates: 68.9937°N 17.3703°E
- Area: 53 km^{2} (20 sq mi)
- Length: 15 km (9.3 mi)
- Width: 6 km (3.7 mi)
- Highest elevation: 563 m (1847 ft)
- Highest point: Bergsheia

Administration
- Norway
- County: Troms
- Municipality: Dyrøy Municipality

Demographics
- Population: 152 (2017)
- Pop. density: 2.9/km^{2} (7.5/sq mi)

Dyrøya (Norwegian) or Divrrát (Northern Sami) is an island in Dyrøy Municipality in Troms county, Norway. The 53-square-kilometre (20 sq mi) island is located between the large island of Senja and the mainland of Norway. The Dyrøysundet strait lies to the east of the island (towards the mainland) and the Tranøyfjorden lies to the north and west (towards Senja). The island of Andørja lies about 7 kilometres (4.3 mi) south of Dyrøya.

The island is connected to the mainland by the Dyrøy Bridge, east of the village of Brøstadbotn. The largest village area on the island is on the central part of the eastern coastline of Dyrøya, including Holm, where Dyrøy Church is located.

== See also ==
- List of islands of Norway
