= Dyrøy Bridge =

Dyrøy Bridge Dyrøybrua
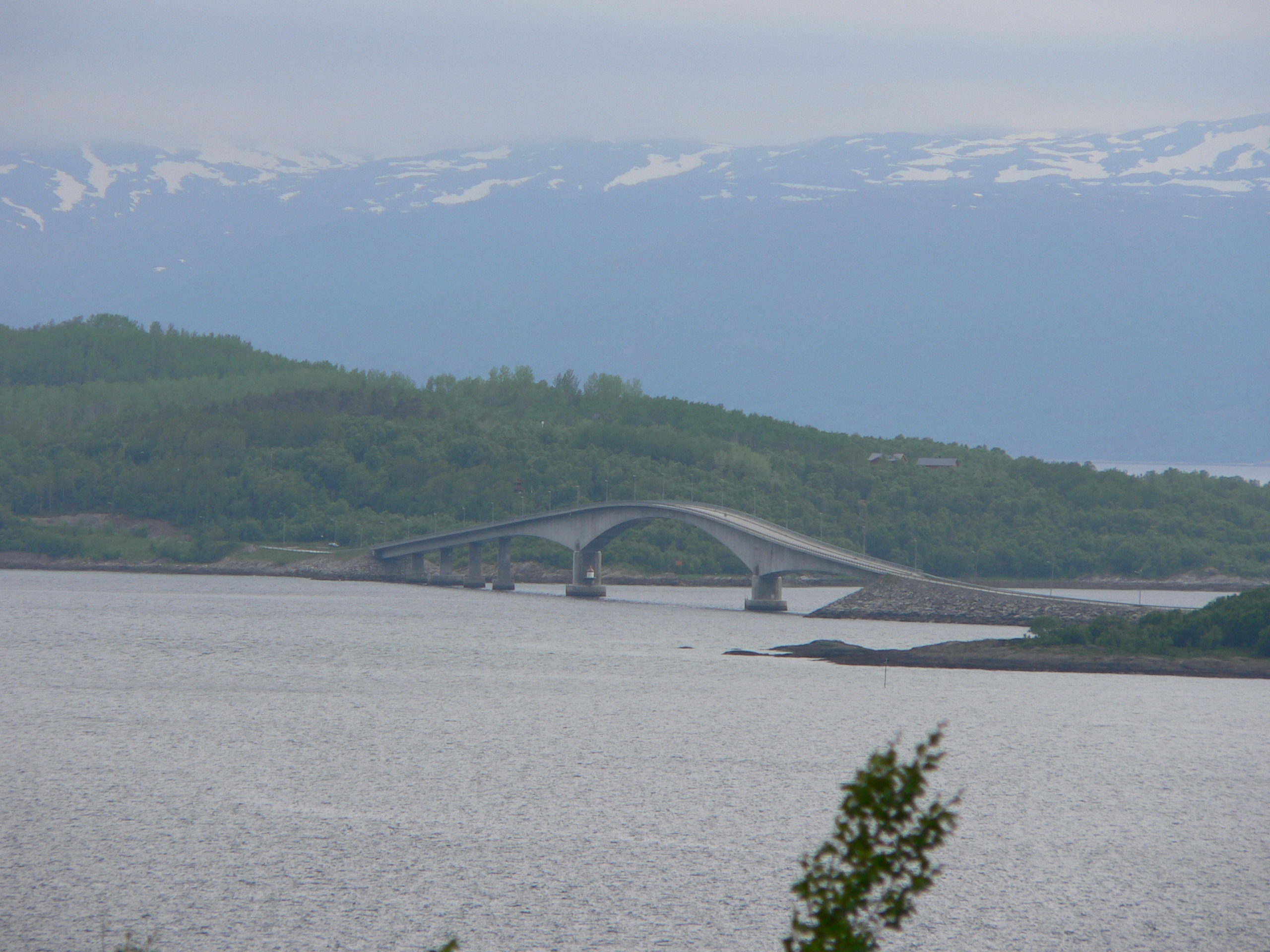
- View of the bridge
- Coordinates: 69.0896°N 17.5943°E
- Carries: Fv212
- Crosses: Dyrøysundet
- Locale: Dyrøy Municipality, Norway

Characteristics
- Material: Concrete
- Total length: 570 metres (1,870 ft)

History
- Opened: 29 August 1994

Dyrøy Bridge (Norwegian: Dyrøybrua) is a cantilever bridge in Dyrøy Municipality in Troms county, Norway. The bridge crosses the Dyrøysundet strait connecting the mainland to the island of Dyrøya. The 570-metre-long (1,870 ft) bridge opened on 29 August 1994. The bridge replaced a ferry connection to the island.

== See also ==
- List of bridges in Norway
- List of bridges in Norway by length
- List of bridges
- List of bridges by length
