= Tranøya (Troms) =

Island in Troms, Norway

Tranøya (Norwegian); Ránáidsuolu (Northern Sami)
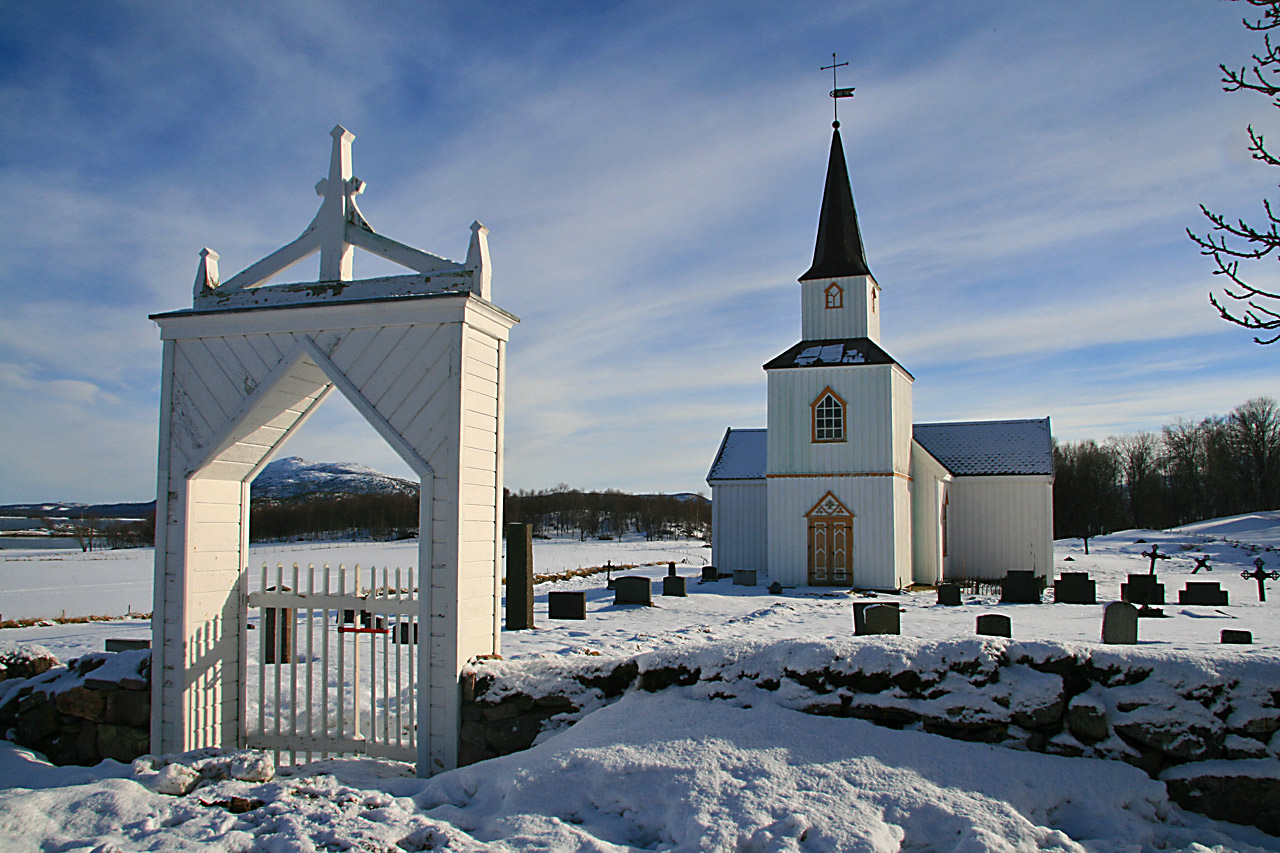
- View of the church on the island
- Interactive map of: Tranøya (Norwegian); Ránáidsuolu (Northern Sami)

Geography
- Location: Troms, Norway
- Coordinates: 69.1447°N 17.4300°E
- Area: 1.18 km^{2} (0.46 sq mi)
- Length: 1.7 km (1.06 mi)
- Width: 1 km (0.6 mi)
- Highest elevation: 32 m (105 ft)
- Highest point: Kongshågen

Administration
- Norway
- County: Troms
- Municipality: Senja Municipality

Tranøya (Norwegian) or Ránáidsuolu (Northern Sami) is an island in Senja Municipality in Troms county, Norway. It is located in the Solbergfjorden, about 1 kilometre (0.62 mi) south of the large island of Senja. The 1.18-square-kilometre (0.46 sq mi) island is almost totally uninhabited. There is one farm area on the eastern side of the island. The farm is also the site of the historic Tranøy Church. Today the farm is owned by the local government and used as a retirement and assisted living facility. There is also a small museum on the site.

== See also ==
- List of islands of Norway
