= Skrolsvik Chapel =

- Skrolsvik kapell
- Skrolsvik Chapel
- 69.063552°N 16.812955°E
- Location: Senja Municipality, Troms
- Country: Norway
- Denomination: Church of Norway
- Churchmanship: Evangelical Lutheran

History
- Status: Parish church
- Founded: 1924
- Consecrated: 1924

Architecture
- Functional status: Active
- Architectural type: Long church
- Completed: 1924 (102 years ago)

Specifications
- Capacity: 170
- Materials: Wood

Administration
- Diocese: Nord-Hålogaland
- Deanery: Senja prosti
- Parish: Tranøy
- Norwegian Cultural Heritage Site
- Type: Church
- Status: Not protected
- ID: 85480

Skrolsvik Chapell (Norwegian: Skrolsvik kapell) is a parish church of the Church of Norway in Senja Municipality in Troms county, Norway. It is located in the village of Skrollsvika on the southwest coast of the island of Senja. It is an annex chapel for the Tranøy parish which is part of the Senja prosti (deanery) in the Diocese of Nord-Hålogaland. The white, wooden church was built in a long church style in 1924. The church seats about 170 people.

== See also ==
- List of churches in Nord-Hålogaland
