= Stonglandseidet =

Village in Senja Municipality, Norway

- Village
- Interactive map of Stonglandseidet
- Location within Troms Location within Norway
- Coordinates: 69°05′07″N 17°10′20″E
- Country: Norway
- Region: Northern Norway
- County: Troms
- District: Midt-Troms
- Municipality: Senja Municipality
- Elevation: 30 m (98 ft)
- Time zone: UTC+01:00 (CET)
  - Summer (DST): UTC+02:00 (CEST)
- Post Code: 9392 Stonglandseidet

Stonglandseidet is a village in Senja Municipality in Troms county, Norway. The village has a population (2001) of 225. The village is home to a grocery store, bank, nursing home, Stonglandet Church, and a public school.

The village is located at the southern end of the island of Senja on the isthmus connecting the main part of the island to the Stonglandet peninsula. It is located about 41 km (25 mi) northeast of the city of Harstad, across the Vågsfjorden. The village of Å is 8 km (5.0 mi) to the west, and the village of Vangsvik is 32 km (20 mi) to the northeast.
