= Stonglandet Church =

- Stonglandet kirke
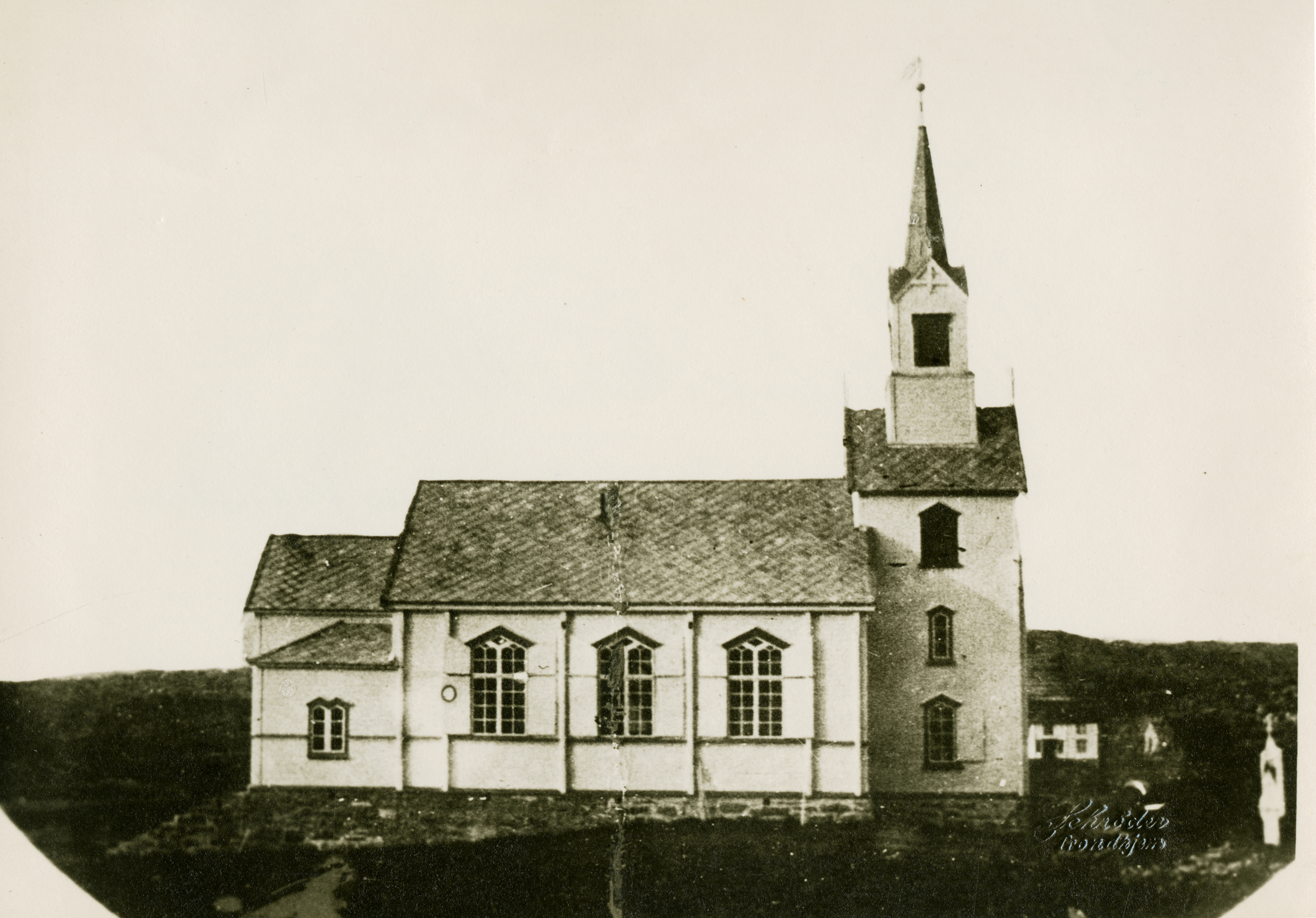
- View of the church (early 1900s)
- Stonglandet Church
- 69.0831975°N 17.1741253°E
- Location: Senja Municipality, Troms
- Country: Norway
- Denomination: Church of Norway
- Churchmanship: Evangelical Lutheran

History
- Status: Parish church
- Founded: 1896
- Consecrated: 1896

Architecture
- Functional status: Active
- Architect: Ole Scheistrøen
- Architectural type: Long church
- Completed: 1896 (130 years ago)

Specifications
- Capacity: 240
- Materials: Wood

Administration
- Diocese: Nord-Hålogaland
- Deanery: Senja prosti
- Parish: Tranøy
- Norwegian Cultural Heritage Site
- Type: Church
- Status: Not protected
- ID: 85576

Stonglandet Church (Norwegian: Stonglandet kirke) is a parish church of the Church of Norway in Senja Municipality in Troms county, Norway. It is located in the village of Stonglandseidet on the south side of the island of Senja. It is one of the churches for the Tranøy parish which is part of the Senja prosti (deanery) in the Diocese of Nord-Hålogaland. The white, wooden church was built in a long church style in 1896 using plans drawn up by the architect Ole Scheistrøen. The church seats about 240 people.

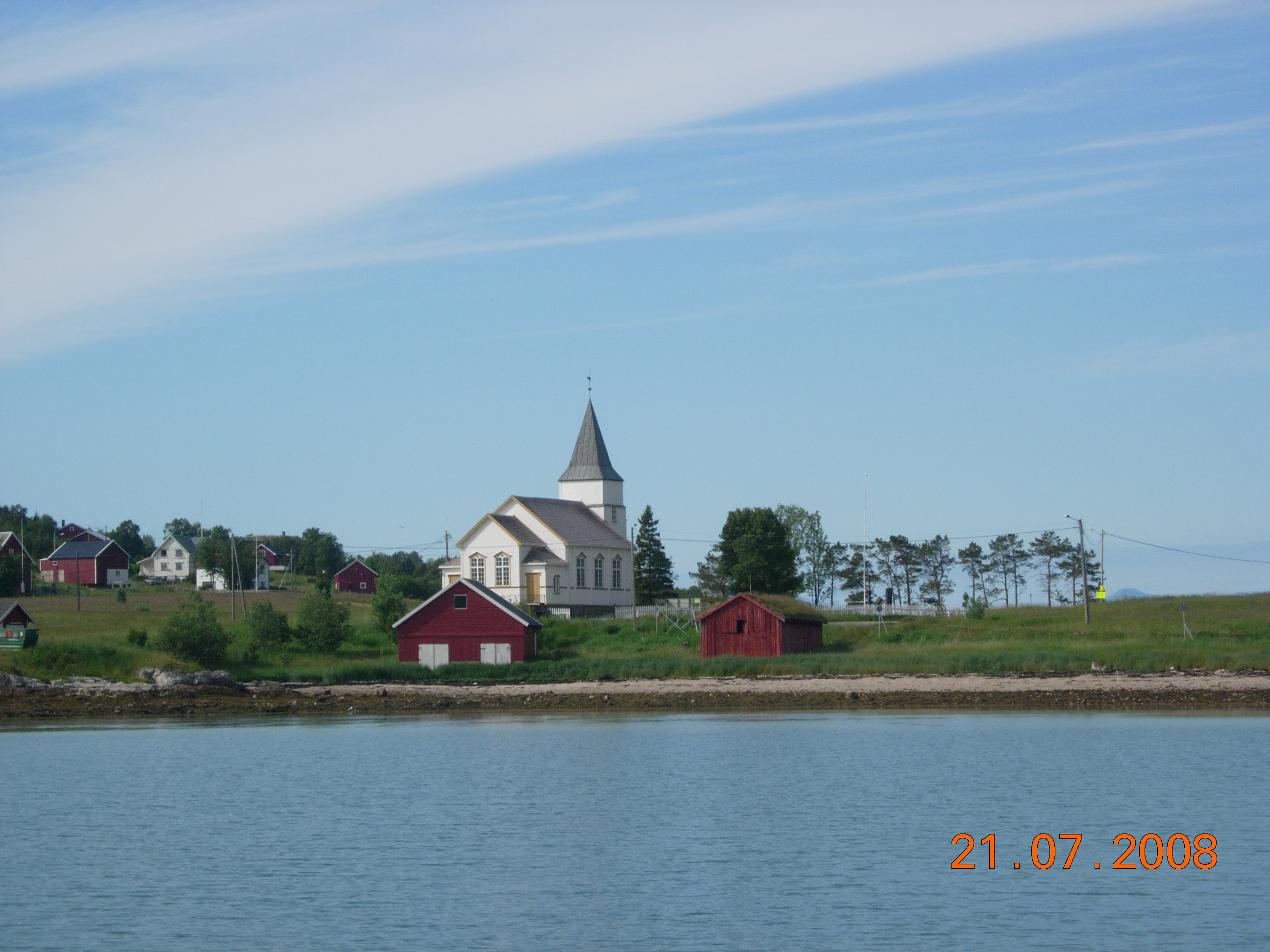
View of the church

== See also ==
- List of churches in Nord-Hålogaland
