= Dyrøy Municipality =

Municipality in Troms, Norway

Dyrøy Municipality Dyrøy kommune Divrráid suohkan (Northern Sami)
- Municipality
- Dyrø herred (historic name)
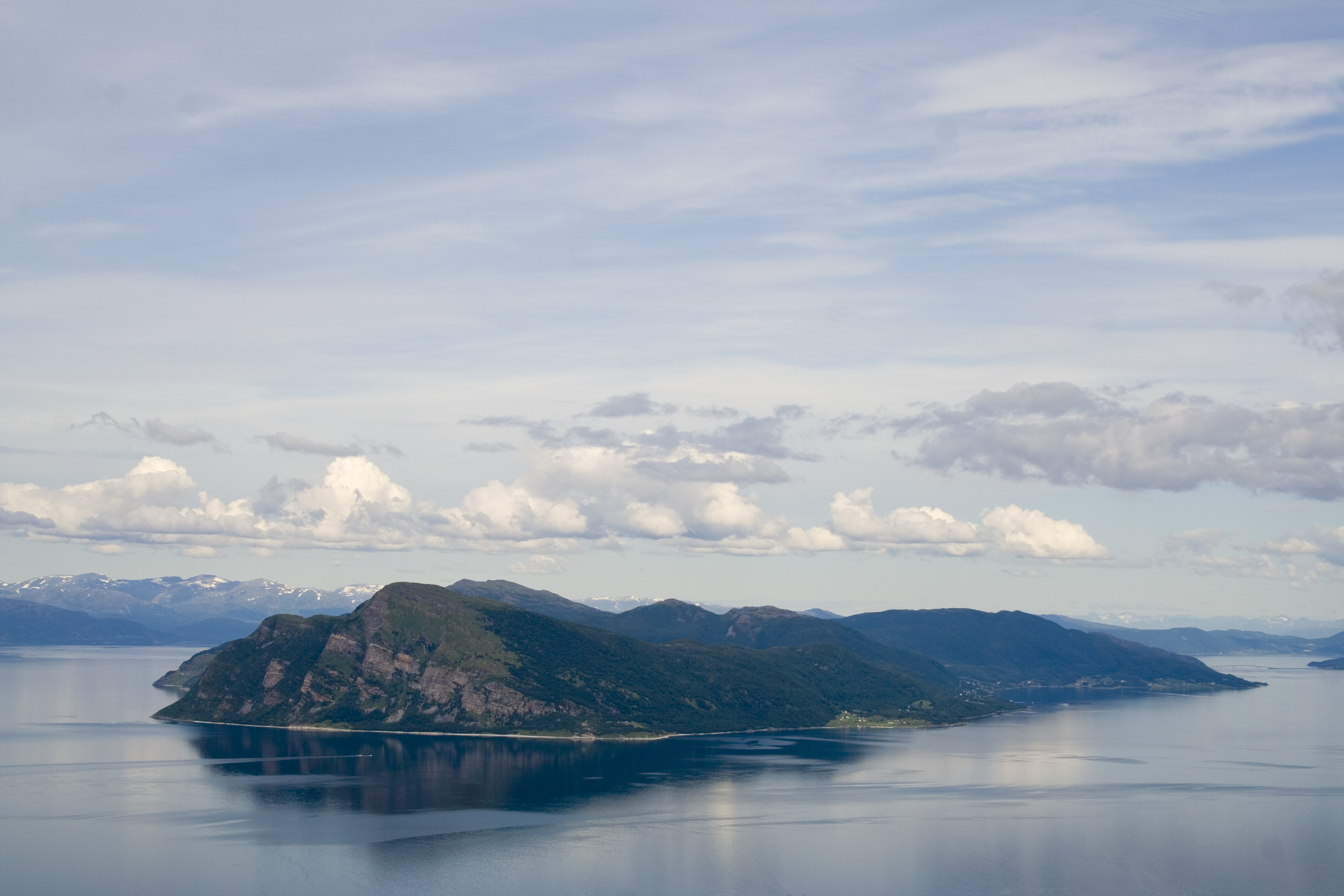
- View of Dyrøya island in Dyrøy

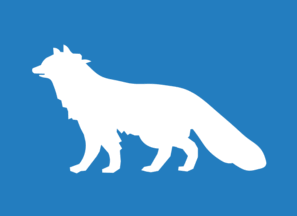
- Flag Coat of arms

- Troms within Norway

- Dyrøy within Troms
- Coordinates: 69°04′01″N 17°44′29″E
- Country: Norway
- County: Troms
- District: Midt-Troms
- Established: 1 Sept 1886
  - Preceded by: Tranøy Municipality
- Administrative centre: Brøstadbotn

Government
  - Mayor (2024): Marit Alvig Espenes (Ap)

Area
  - Total: 288.64 km^{2} (111.44 sq mi)
  - Land: 277.08 km^{2} (106.98 sq mi)
  - Water: 11.56 km^{2} (4.46 sq mi) 4%
  - Rank: #270 in Norway
- Highest elevation: 1,240.51 m (4,069.9 ft)

Population (2025)
  - Total: 1,069
  - Rank: #330 in Norway
  - Density: 3.7/km^{2} (9.6/sq mi)
  - Change (10 years): ▼ −8.4%
- Demonym: Dyrøyværing

Official language
  - Norwegian form: Bokmål
- Time zone: UTC+01:00 (CET)
  - Summer (DST): UTC+02:00 (CEST)
- ISO 3166 code: NO-5528
- Website: Official website

Dyrøy (Northern Sami: Divrráid suohkan) is a municipality in Troms county, Norway. The administrative centre of the municipality is the village of Brøstadbotn. Other villages include Dyrøyhamn, Espenes, Holm, and Hundstrand.

The 289-square-kilometre (112 sq mi) municipality is the 270th largest by area out of the 357 municipalities in Norway. Dyrøy Municipality is the 330th most populous municipality in Norway with a population of 1,069. The municipality's population density is 3.7 inhabitants per square kilometre (9.6/sq mi) and its population has decreased by 8.4% over the previous 10-year period.

The municipality is named after the island of Dyrøya, which is connected with the mainland with the modern Dyrøy Bridge. Most people, however, don't live on the island, but live in Brøstadbotn on the mainland.

== General information ==
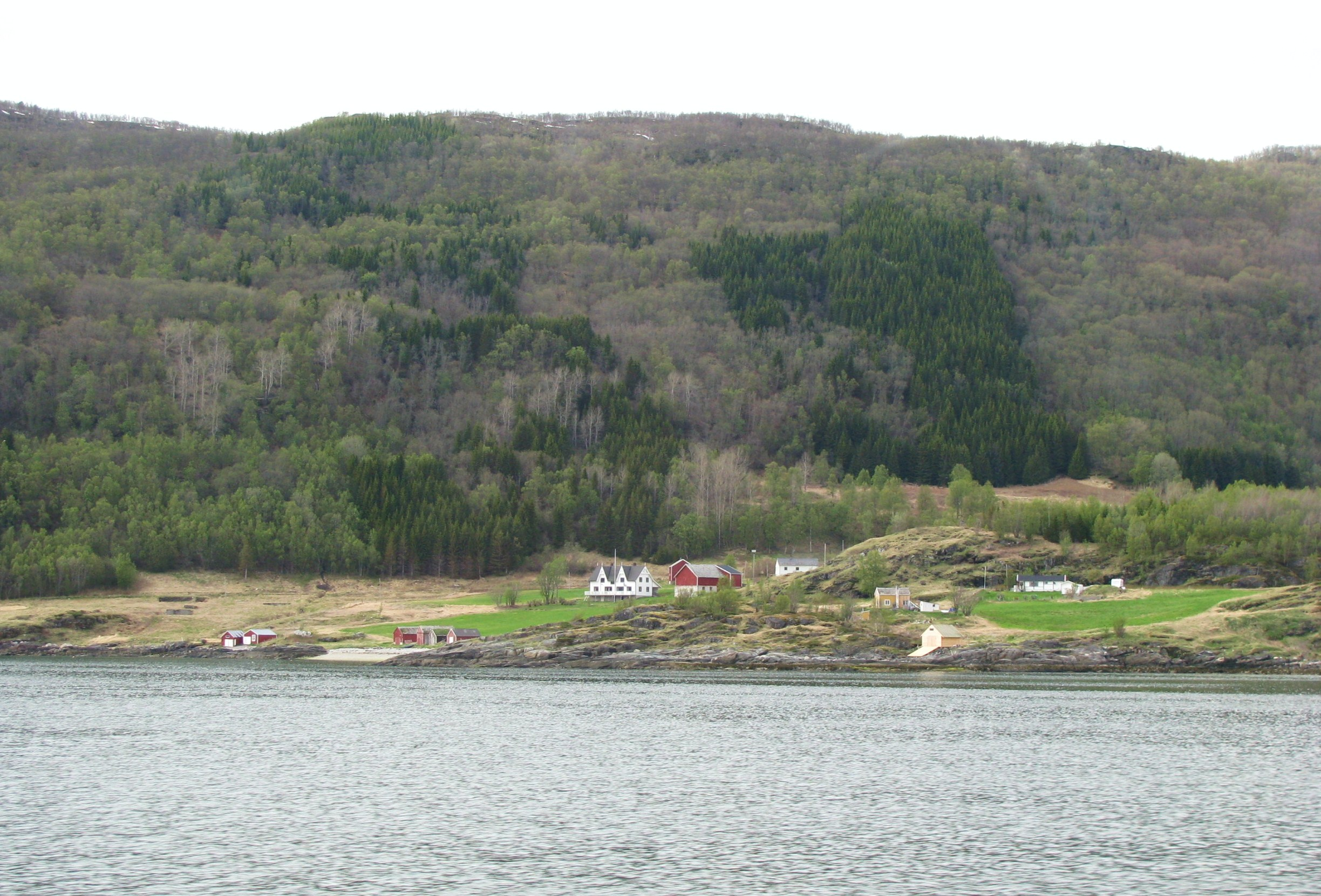
View of a farm in Dyrøy

The municipality of Dyrøy was established on 1 September 1886, when it was separated from Tranøy Municipality. The initial population of Dyrøy was 1,281. During the 1960s, there were many municipal mergers across Norway due to the work of the Schei Committee. On 1 January 1964, the parts of Tranøy Municipality located on the mainland (population: 382) were transferred to Dyrøy.

On 1 January 2020, the municipality became part of the newly formed Troms og Finnmark county. Previously, it had been part of the old Troms county. On 1 January 2024, the Troms og Finnmark county was divided and the municipality once again became part of Troms county.

=== Name ===
The municipality (originally the parish) is named after the island of Dyrøya (Old Norse: Dýrøy) since the first Dyrøy Church was built there. The first element is dýr which means "wild animal", here likely referring to deer or reindeer. The last element is øy which means "island". Historically, the name of the municipality was spelled Dyrø. On 6 January 1908, a royal resolution changed the spelling of the name of the municipality to Dyrøy, to give the name a more Norwegian and less Danish spelling due to Norwegian language reforms.

=== Coat of arms ===
The coat of arms was granted on 4 April 1986. The official blazon is "Azure, a fox statant argent" (Norwegian: I blått en stående sølv rev). This means the arms have a blue field (background) and the charge is a locally-bred platinum fox. The fox has a tincture of argent which means it is commonly colored white, but if it is made out of metal, then silver is used. The fur industry has had a long tradition in Dyrøy and in the 1930s, a special sort of arctic fox was bred there which was called the platinum fox. The arms were designed by Svein A. Berntsen.

=== Churches ===
The Church of Norway has one parish (sokn) within Dyrøy Municipality. It is part of the Senja prosti (deanery) in the Diocese of Nord-Hålogaland.

Churches in Dyrøy Municipality
Parish (sokn)	Church name	Location of the church	Year built
Dyrøy	Dyrøy Church	Holm	1880
Dyrøy	Brøstad Chapel	Brøstadbotn	1937

== Geography ==
The municipality is located on the island of Dyrøya and the mainland area to the east, with the Dyrøy Bridge connecting the island to the mainland. The Vågsfjorden, Tranøyfjorden, and Solbergfjorden flow along the western and northern border of the municipality.

The municipality is mountainous with a narrow beach area along the coast. On the mainland, the Bjørkebakkdalen valley leads south from the municipal center Brøstadbotn. The highest point in the municipality is the 1,240.51-metre (4,069.9 ft) tall mountain Løksetinden, on the border with Salangen Municipality in the south.

=== Climate ===
Climate data for Brøstadbotn
Month	Jan	Feb	Mar	Apr	May	Jun	Jul	Aug	Sep	Oct	Nov	Dec	Year
Daily mean °C (°F)	−4.1 (24.6)	−3.9 (25.0)	−2.1 (28.2)	1.1 (34.0)	5.6 (42.1)	10.0 (50.0)	12.4 (54.3)	11.6 (52.9)	7.6 (45.7)	3.5 (38.3)	−0.6 (30.9)	−2.9 (26.8)	3.2 (37.8)
Average precipitation mm (inches)	101 (4.0)	94 (3.7)	73 (2.9)	63 (2.5)	47 (1.9)	57 (2.2)	70 (2.8)	78 (3.1)	101 (4.0)	135 (5.3)	111 (4.4)	110 (4.3)	1,040 (40.9)
Source: Norwegian Meteorological Institute

== Government ==
Dyrøy Municipality is responsible for primary education (through 10th grade), outpatient health services, senior citizen services, welfare and other social services, zoning, economic development, and municipal roads and utilities. The municipality is governed by a municipal council of directly elected representatives. The mayor is indirectly elected by a vote of the municipal council. The municipality is under the jurisdiction of the Nord-Troms og Senja District Court and the Hålogaland Court of Appeal.

=== Municipal council ===
The municipal council (Kommunestyre) of Dyrøy Municipality is made up of 15 representatives that are elected to four year terms. The tables below show the current and historical composition of the council by political party.

Dyrøy kommunestyre 2023–2027
Party name (in Norwegian)	Number of representatives
Labour Party (Arbeiderpartiet)	5
Progress Party (Fremskrittspartiet)	2
Conservative Party (Høyre)	3
Centre Party (Senterpartiet)	3
Socialist Left Party (Sosialistisk Venstreparti)	2
Total number of members:	15

Dyrøy kommunestyre 2019–2023
Party name (in Norwegian)	Number of representatives
Labour Party (Arbeiderpartiet)	6
Progress Party (Fremskrittspartiet)	2
Conservative Party (Høyre)	1
Centre Party (Senterpartiet)	5
Socialist Left Party (Sosialistisk Venstreparti)	1
Total number of members:	15

Dyrøy kommunestyre 2015–2019
Party name (in Norwegian)	Number of representatives
Labour Party (Arbeiderpartiet)	5
Progress Party (Fremskrittspartiet)	4
Conservative Party (Høyre)	2
Centre Party (Senterpartiet)	2
Socialist Left Party (Sosialistisk Venstreparti)	1
Common List for Dyrøy (Felleslista for Dyrøy)	1
Total number of members:	15

Dyrøy kommunestyre 2011–2015
Party name (in Norwegian)	Number of representatives
Labour Party (Arbeiderpartiet)	6
Conservative Party (Høyre)	2
Centre Party (Senterpartiet)	3
Socialist Left Party (Sosialistisk Venstreparti)	1
Common List for Dyrøy (Felleslista for Dyrøy)	3
Total number of members:	15

Dyrøy kommunestyre 2007–2011
Party name (in Norwegian)	Number of representatives
Labour Party (Arbeiderpartiet)	6
Christian Democratic Party (Kristelig Folkeparti)	1
Centre Party (Senterpartiet)	2
Socialist Left Party (Sosialistisk Venstreparti)	2
Common list for Dyrøy (Felleslista for Dyrøy)	4
Total number of members:	15

Dyrøy kommunestyre 2003–2007
Party name (in Norwegian)	Number of representatives
Labour Party (Arbeiderpartiet)	7
Christian Democratic Party (Kristelig Folkeparti)	1
Centre Party (Senterpartiet)	3
Socialist Left Party (Sosialistisk Venstreparti)	2
Common list for Dyrøy (Felleslista for Dyrøy)	2
Total number of members:	15

Dyrøy kommunestyre 1999–2003
Party name (in Norwegian)	Number of representatives
Labour Party (Arbeiderpartiet)	12
Christian Democratic Party (Kristelig Folkeparti)	2
Centre Party (Senterpartiet)	3
Common list for Dyrøya (Fellesliste for Dyrøya)	2
Total number of members:	19

Dyrøy kommunestyre 1995–1999
Party name (in Norwegian)	Number of representatives
Labour Party (Arbeiderpartiet)	8
Christian Democratic Party (Kristelig Folkeparti)	1
Centre Party (Senterpartiet)	7
Socialist Left Party (Sosialistisk Venstreparti)	2
Common list for Dyrøya (Fellesliste for Dyrøya)	1
Total number of members:	19

Dyrøy kommunestyre 1991–1995
Party name (in Norwegian)	Number of representatives
Labour Party (Arbeiderpartiet)	8
Conservative Party (Høyre)	1
Christian Democratic Party (Kristelig Folkeparti)	1
Centre Party (Senterpartiet)	5
Socialist Left Party (Sosialistisk Venstreparti)	2
For Dyrøya (For Dyrøya)	2
Total number of members:	19

Dyrøy kommunestyre 1987–1991
Party name (in Norwegian)	Number of representatives
Labour Party (Arbeiderpartiet)	10
Conservative Party (Høyre)	3
Christian Democratic Party (Kristelig Folkeparti)	1
Centre Party (Senterpartiet)	4
Common list for Dyrøya (Fellesliste for Dyrøya)	1
Total number of members:	19

Dyrøy kommunestyre 1983–1987
Party name (in Norwegian)	Number of representatives
Labour Party (Arbeiderpartiet)	9
Conservative Party (Høyre)	2
Christian Democratic Party (Kristelig Folkeparti)	1
Centre Party (Senterpartiet)	6
Common list for Dyrøya (Fellesliste for Dyrøya)	1
Total number of members:	19

Dyrøy kommunestyre 1979–1983
Party name (in Norwegian)	Number of representatives
Labour Party (Arbeiderpartiet)	5
Conservative Party (Høyre)	2
Christian Democratic Party (Kristelig Folkeparti)	2
Centre Party (Senterpartiet)	6
Inland Dyrøy Common List (Dyrøy Innland Bygdeliste)	2
Common list for Dyrøy (Fellesliste for Dyrøy)	2
Total number of members:	19

Dyrøy kommunestyre 1975–1979
Party name (in Norwegian)	Number of representatives
Labour Party (Arbeiderpartiet)	7
Christian Democratic Party (Kristelig Folkeparti)	2
Centre Party (Senterpartiet)	7
Socialist Left Party (Sosialistisk Venstreparti)	2
Common list for Dyrøya (Fellesliste for Dyrøya)	1
Total number of members:	19

Dyrøy kommunestyre 1971–1975
Party name (in Norwegian)	Number of representatives
Labour Party (Arbeiderpartiet)	9
Christian Democratic Party (Kristelig Folkeparti)	1
Centre Party (Senterpartiet)	6
Socialist People's Party (Sosialistisk Folkeparti)	1
Local List(s) (Lokale lister)	2
Total number of members:	19

Dyrøy kommunestyre 1967–1971
Party name (in Norwegian)	Number of representatives
Labour Party (Arbeiderpartiet)	9
Joint List(s) of Non-Socialist Parties (Borgerlige Felleslister)	5
Local List(s) (Lokale lister)	4
Total number of members:	19

Dyrøy kommunestyre 1963–1967
Party name (in Norwegian)	Number of representatives
Local List(s) (Lokale lister)	19
Total number of members:	19

Dyrøy herredsstyre 1959–1963
Party name (in Norwegian)	Number of representatives
Labour Party (Arbeiderpartiet)	5
Local List(s) (Lokale lister)	12
Total number of members:	17

Dyrøy herredsstyre 1955–1959
Party name (in Norwegian)	Number of representatives
Local List(s) (Lokale lister)	17
Total number of members:	17

Dyrøy herredsstyre 1951–1955
Party name (in Norwegian)	Number of representatives
Local List(s) (Lokale lister)	16
Total number of members:	16

Dyrøy herredsstyre 1947–1951
Party name (in Norwegian)	Number of representatives
Labour Party (Arbeiderpartiet)	5
Local List(s) (Lokale lister)	11
Total number of members:	16

Dyrøy herredsstyre 1945–1947
Party name (in Norwegian)	Number of representatives
Labour Party (Arbeiderpartiet)	6
List of workers, fishermen, and small farmholders (Arbeidere, fiskere, småbrukere liste)	3
Local List(s) (Lokale lister)	7
Total number of members:	16

Dyrøy herredsstyre 1937–1941*
Party name (in Norwegian)	Number of representatives
Labour Party (Arbeiderpartiet)	2
List of workers, fishermen, and small farmholders (Arbeidere, fiskere, småbrukere liste)	6
Joint List(s) of Non-Socialist Parties (Borgerlige Felleslister)	5
Local List(s) (Lokale lister)	3
Total number of members:	16
Note: Due to the German occupation of Norway during World War II, no elections were held for new municipal councils until after the war ended in 1945.

=== Mayors ===
The mayor (Norwegian: ordfører) of Dyrøy Municipality is the political leader of the municipality and the chairperson of the municipal council. Here is a list of people who have held this position:

- 1886–1894: Hans Strøm
- 1895–1896: Ole Larsen
- 1897–1913: Bersvend Larsen Hjeldbø
- 1914–1931: Hans Nilsen
- 1932–1941: Albert Kastnes
- 1941–1945: Ludvik Myrvang
- 1945–1947: Bjarne Johnsen
- 1948–1955: Hans Vang
- 1956–1957: Bjarne Johnsen
- 1957–1963: Bjarne Hansen (Ap)
- 1963–1967: Magnar Hals
- 1967–1975: Leif Bakkejord (Ap)
- 1975–1979: Ole Jakobsen (Ap)
- 1979–1983: Magnar Hals (Sp)
- 1983–1995: Ole Jakobsen (Ap)
- 1995–2011: Rolf Espenes (Ap)
- 2011–2015: Randi Lillegård (Ap)
- 2015–2023: Marit Alvig Espenes (Ap)
- 2023–2024: Kjell-Sverre Myrvoll (Sp)
- 2024–present: Marit Alvig Espenes (Ap)
