= Solbergfjorden =

Fjord in Troms county, Norway

- Interactive map of the fjord
- Location: Troms county, Norway
- Coordinates: 69.1401°N 17.6599°E
- Type: Strait
- Basin countries: Norway
- Max. length: 27 kilometres (17 mi)
- Islands: Senja

Solbergfjorden is a fjord (or more accurately, a strait) on the southeastern side of the large island of Senja in Troms county, Norway. The fjord flows through Dyrøy Municipality, Sørreisa Municipality, and Senja Municipality. The 27-kilometre (17 mi) long strait flows into the Vågsfjorden to the southwest and into the Finnfjorden and Reisafjorden in the northeast. The village of Vangsvik is one of the larger settlements along the Solbergfjorden.

== See also ==
- List of Norwegian fjords
