= Å, Senja =

Village in Senja Municipality, Norway

Å Aa (historic name)
- Village
- Interactive map of Å
- Location within Troms Location within Norway
- Coordinates: 69°04′44″N 16°59′59″E
- Country: Norway
- Region: Northern Norway
- County: Troms
- District: Midt-Troms
- Municipality: Senja Municipality
- Elevation: 3 m (9.8 ft)

Population (2001)
  - Total: 132
- Time zone: UTC+01:00 (CET)
  - Summer (DST): UTC+02:00 (CEST)
- Post Code: 9392 Stonglandseidet

Å is a village in Senja Municipality in Troms county, Norway. The village is home to 132 residents (2001). The village is about 36 kilometres (22 mi) across the Vågsfjorden from the city of Harstad. There is a daycare in Å, the school, church, and stores, however, are located 8 km (5.0 mi) to the east in the neighboring village of Stonglandseidet.

The village of Å is located on the southern part of the island of Senja. The village is located near the Åvatnet lake and is in the Ådalen valley. A small river flows from the lake through the village and into the fjord. Å is located at the base of the 396-metre (1,299 ft) tall mountain, Åkollen. About 10 kilometres (6.2 mi) to the west is Skrollsvika where there is a ferry connection to Harstad.

== Name ==
The village (originally a farm) was first mentioned in 1610 ("Aa"). The name is from Old Norse á, which means "(small) river".
