= Dyrøya, Øksnes =

Island in Nordland, Norway

Dyrøya
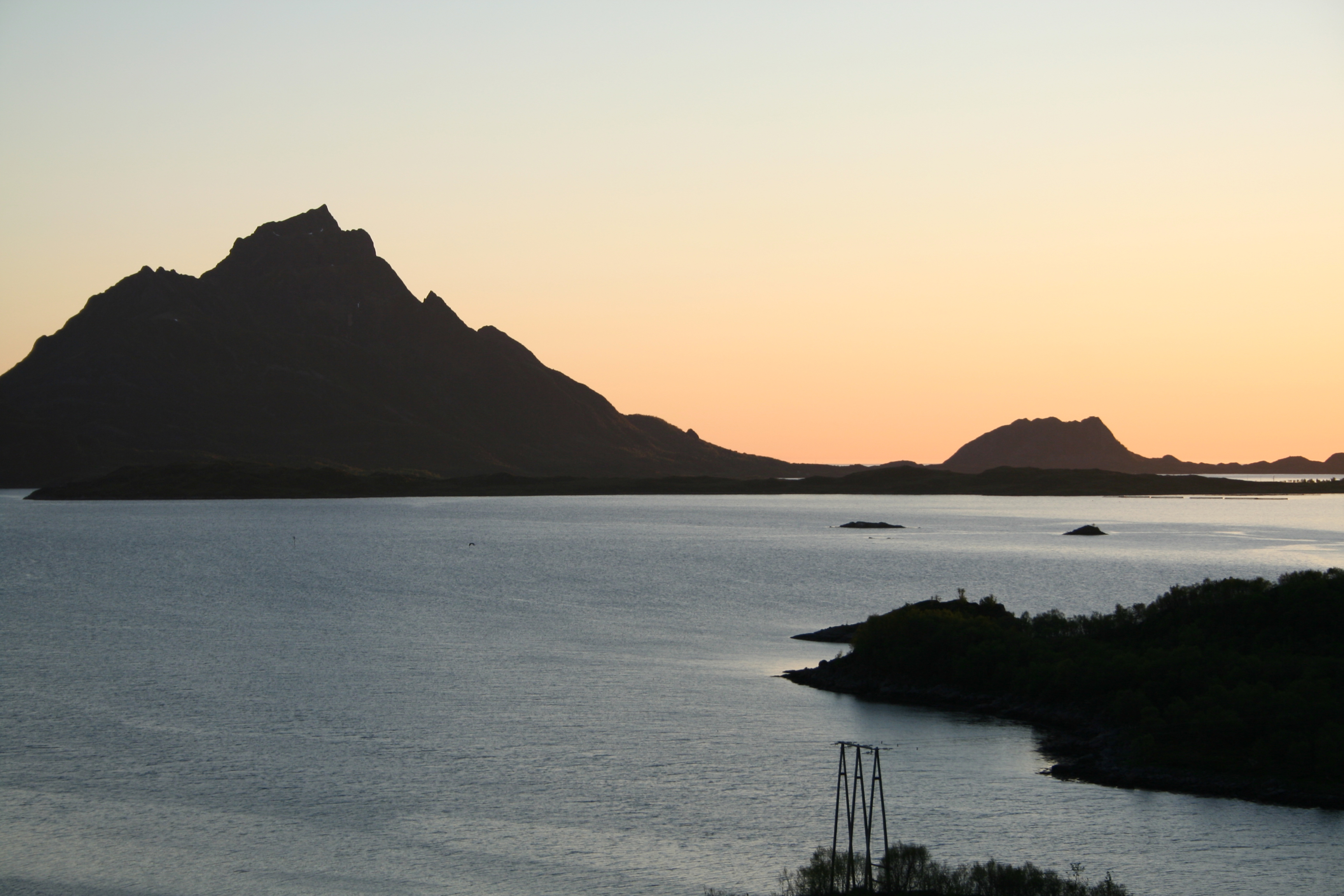
- Dyrøya is on the left (with the tall mountain)
- Interactive map of Dyrøya

Geography
- Location: Nordland, Norway
- Coordinates: 68.8102°N 14.8260°E
- Archipelago: Vesterålen
- Area: 6.5 km^{2} (2.5 sq mi)
- Length: 4 km (2.5 mi)
- Width: 2.8 km (1.74 mi)
- Highest elevation: 562 m (1844 ft)
- Highest point: Blåtinden

Administration
- Norway
- County: Nordland
- Municipality: Øksnes Municipality

Dyrøya is a small island in Øksnes Municipality in Nordland county, Norway. It is located off the west coast of the large island of Langøya in the Vesterålen archipelago. The small islands of Nærøya and Tindsøya lie to the west and the island of Skogsøya lies to the north. The 6.5-square-kilometre (2.5 sq mi) island has one village, Barkestad, and there are only 4 residents on this island (in 2017). There are no road connections to the island, so all residents must use boats. The highest point on the island is the 562-metre (1,844 ft) tall mountain Blåtinden.

== See also ==
- List of islands of Norway
