= Å, Ibestad =

Village in Ibestad Municipality, Norway

Å Aa (historic spelling)
- Village
- Interactive map of Å
- Location within Troms Location within Norway
- Coordinates: 68°50′08″N 17°11′09″E
- Country: Norway
- Region: Northern Norway
- County: Troms
- District: Central Hålogaland
- Municipality: Ibestad Municipality
- Elevation: 18 m (59 ft)
- Time zone: UTC+01:00 (CET)
  - Summer (DST): UTC+02:00 (CEST)
- Post Code: 9454 Ånstad

Å is a village in Ibestad Municipality in Troms county, Norway. It is located about 26 kilometres (16 mi) east of the town of Harstad on the southwest side of the island of Andørja, along the Bygda strait which goes between the Vågsfjorden and the Astafjorden. The village of Å and the neighboring villages of Laupstad and Ånstad altogether have a total population (2001) of 205 residents.

The village is about 4 kilometres (2.5 mi) north of the village of Sørvika where the undersea Ibestad Tunnel connects Andørja island to the neighboring island of Rolla, where Hamnvik, the municipal center is located. The village is named after the river Å-elva, which flows past it from the nearby mountains of Snøtinden, Ristindend, and Åtinden–all of which are more than 1,000 metres (3,300 ft) above sea level.

== Name ==
The village (originally a farm) was first mentioned in 1375 ("Aam"). The name was originally the plural of the Old Norse word á, which means "(small) river". (There is just one river here, so the plural form might be explained by the fact that the farm was divided in two parts.)
