= Andørja Municipality =

Former municipality in Troms, Norway

Andørja Municipality Andørja herred
- Former municipality
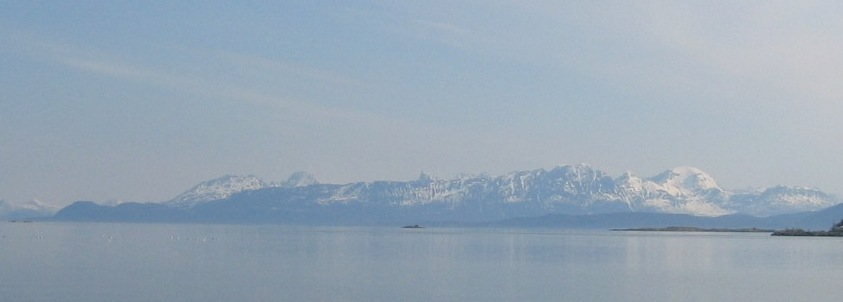
- Andørja viewed from Harstad

- Troms within Norway

- Andørja within Troms
- Coordinates: 68°48′53″N 17°17′41″E
- Country: Norway
- County: Troms
- District: Central Hålogaland
- Established: 1 July 1926; 100 years ago
  - Preceded by: Ibestad Municipality
- Disestablished: 1 January 1964; 62 years ago
  - Succeeded by: Ibestad Municipality
- Administrative centre: Engenes

Area (upon dissolution)
  - Total: 135.4 km^{2} (52.3 sq mi)
  - Rank: #455 in Norway
- Highest elevation: 1,275.9 m (4,186 ft)

Population (1963)
  - Total: 1,343
  - Rank: #558 in Norway
  - Density: 9.9/km^{2} (26/sq mi)
  - Change (10 years): ▼ −3.5%
- Demonym: Andørja-folk

Official language
  - Norwegian form: Bokmål
- Time zone: UTC+01:00 (CET)
  - Summer (DST): UTC+02:00 (CEST)
- ISO 3166 code: NO-1916

Andørja is a former municipality in Troms county in Norway. The 135-square-kilometre (52 sq mi) municipality existed from 1926 until its dissolution in 1964. The area now makes up the northeastern half of Ibestad Municipality. It encompassed the entire island of Andørja plus a number of other small islands and skerries surrounding it. The administrative centre was located at Engenes where the Andørja Church was also located.

Prior to its dissolution in 1964, the 135.4-square-kilometre (52.3 sq mi) municipality was the 455th largest by area out of the 689 municipalities in Norway. Andørja Municipality was the 558th most populous municipality in Norway with a population of about 1,343. The municipality's population density was 9.9 inhabitants per square kilometre (26/sq mi) and its population had decreased by 3.5% over the previous 10-year period.

== General information ==
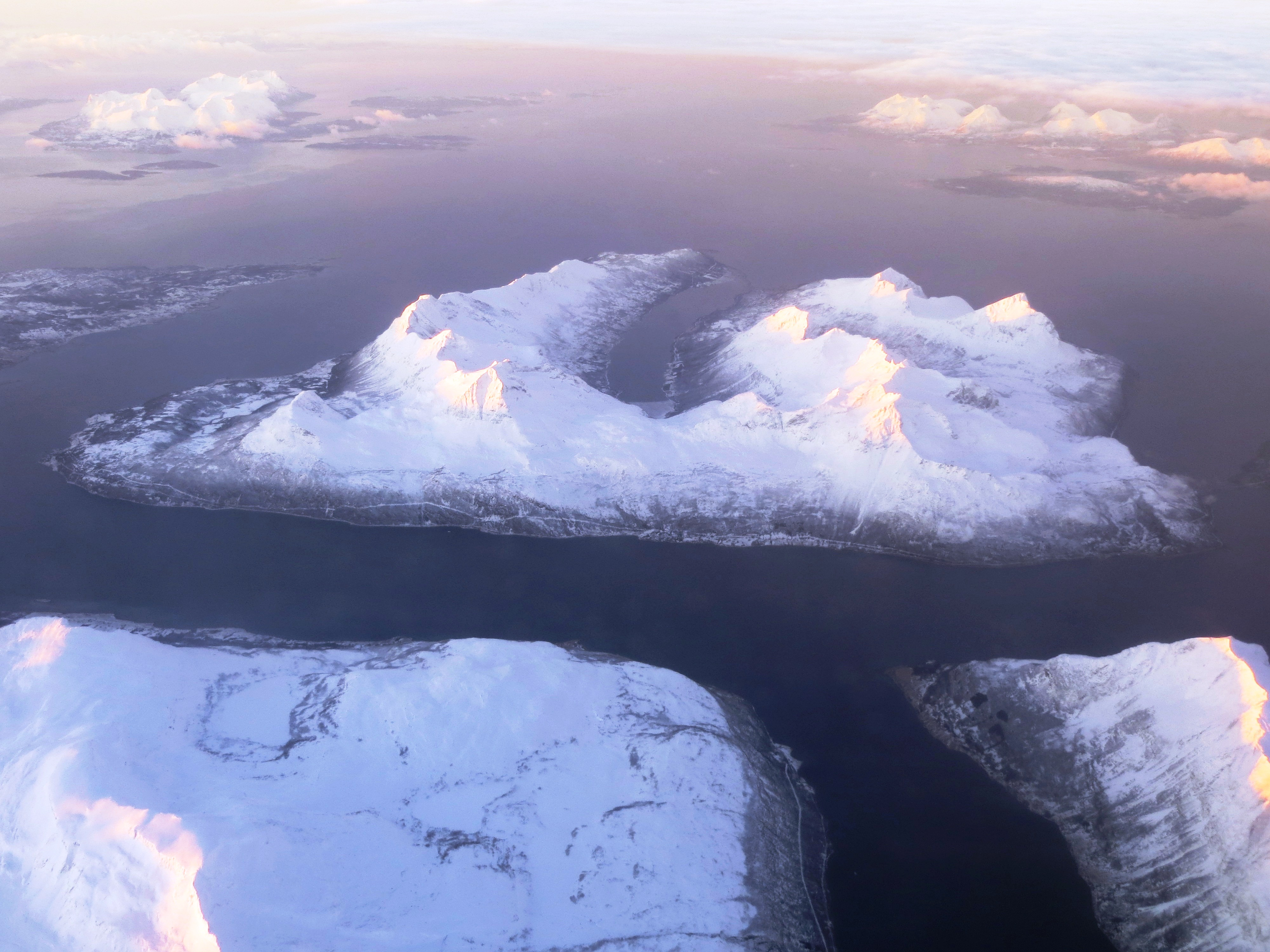
Aerial view of Andørja

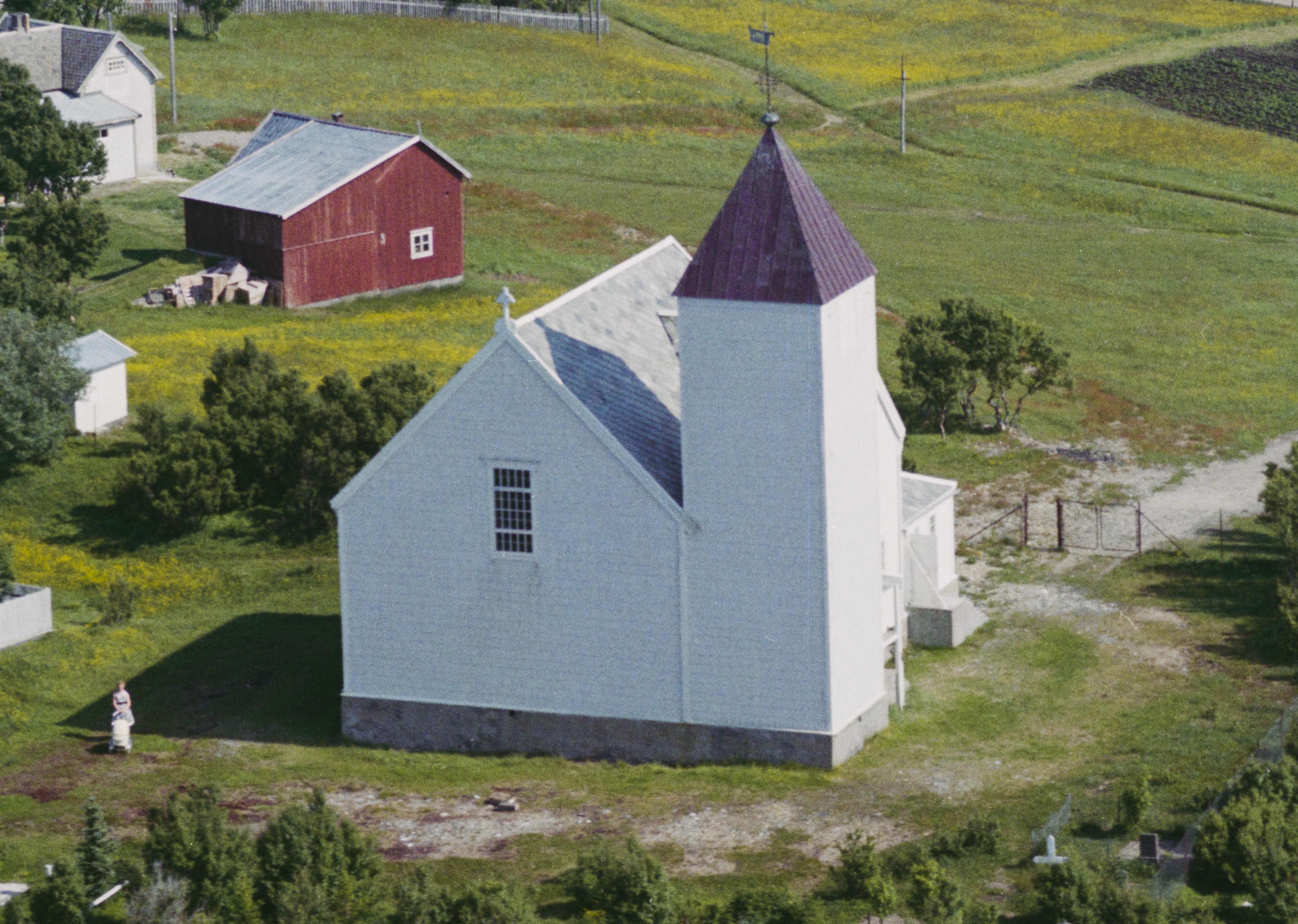
View of the local Andørja Church

The municipality of Andørja was established on 1 July 1926 when the large Ibestad Municipality was separated into four municipalities: Ibestad Municipality (population: 1,768), Andørja Municipality (population: 1,420), Astafjord Municipality (population: 1,018), and Gratangen Municipality (population: 1,967). During the 1960s, there were many municipal mergers across Norway due to the work of the Schei Committee. On 1 January 1964, there was a merger where Andørja Municipality (population: 1,330) and Ibestad Municipality (population: 1,821) were merged with the part of neighboring Skånland Municipality that was located on the island of Rolla (population: 134) to form the new, larger Ibestad Municipality.

=== Name ===
The municipality is named after the island of Andørja (Old Norse: Andyrja). The meaning of the name is not certain, but one theory is that the first element and which means "against". The last element is yrja which means "gravel" or "rocks", possibly referring to the waves from the sea hitting against the rocky shores.

=== Churches ===
The Church of Norway had one parish (sokn) within Andørja Municipality. It was part of the Ibestad prestegjeld and the Trondenes prosti (deanery) in the Diocese of Nord-Hålogaland.

Churches in Andørja Municipality
Parish (sokn)	Church name	Location of the church	Year built
Andørja	Andørja Church	Engenes	1914

== Geography ==
The highest point in the municipality is the 1,275.9-metre (4,186 ft) tall mountain Langlitinden.

== Government ==
While it existed, Andørja Municipality was responsible for primary education (through 10th grade), outpatient health services, senior citizen services, welfare and other social services, zoning, economic development, and municipal roads and utilities. The municipality was governed by a municipal council of directly elected representatives. The mayor was indirectly elected by a vote of the municipal council. The municipality was under the jurisdiction of the Hålogaland Court of Appeal.

=== Municipal council ===
The municipal council (Herredsstyre) of Andørja Municipality was made up of 17 representatives that were elected to four year terms. The tables below show the historical composition of the council by political party.

Andørja herredsstyre 1959–1963
Party name (in Norwegian)	Number of representatives
Christian Democratic Party (Kristelig Folkeparti)	2
Local List(s) (Lokale lister)	15
Total number of members:	17
Note: On 1 January 1964, Andørja Municipality became part of Ibestad Municipality.

Andørja herredsstyre 1955–1959
Party name (in Norwegian)	Number of representatives
Local List(s) (Lokale lister)	17
Total number of members:	17

Andørja herredsstyre 1951–1955
Party name (in Norwegian)	Number of representatives
Labour Party (Arbeiderpartiet)	3
Local List(s) (Lokale lister)	13
Total number of members:	16

Andørja herredsstyre 1947–1951
Party name (in Norwegian)	Number of representatives
Labour Party (Arbeiderpartiet)	6
Local List(s) (Lokale lister)	10
Total number of members:	16

Andørja herredsstyre 1945–1947
Party name (in Norwegian)	Number of representatives
Local List(s) (Lokale lister)	16
Total number of members:	16

Andørja herredsstyre 1937–1941*
Party name (in Norwegian)	Number of representatives
Joint List(s) of Non-Socialist Parties (Borgerlige Felleslister)	10
Local List(s) (Lokale lister)	2
Total number of members:	12
Note: Due to the German occupation of Norway during World War II, no elections were held for new municipal councils until after the war ended in 1945.

=== Mayors ===
The mayor (Norwegian: ordfører) of Andørja Municipality was the political leader of the municipality and the chairperson of the municipal council. Here is a list of people who have held this position:

- 1926–1928: Magnus Ånstad (NSA)
- 1929–1931: Tollef J. Danielsen (Ap)
- 1932–1941: Magnus Ånstad (Ap)
- 1941–1942: Edvin Lynghaug (NS)
- 1942–1945: Sigurd Hammer (NS)
- 1945–1945: Magnus Ånstad (Ap)
- 1946–1951: Sigurd Hammer (H)
- 1952–1959: Karl Berg (Ap)
- 1960–1963: Sigurd Hammer (KrF)

== See also ==
- List of former municipalities of Norway
