= Ibestad =

Ibestad may refer to:

== Places ==
- Ibestad Municipality, a municipality in Troms county, Norway
- Ibestad, also known as Hamnvik, a village within Ibestad Municipality in Troms county, Norway
- Ibestad Church, a church in Ibestad Municipality in Troms county, Norway
- Ibestad Tunnel, an undersea road tunnel in Ibestad Municipality in Troms county, Norway

== Other ==
- MF Ibestad, a car ferry owned by Norled that operates in Troms county, Norway
- Ibestad IL, a sports club in Ibestad Municipality in Troms county, Norway
