= Forså =

Village in Ibestad Municipality, Norway

- Village
- Interactive map of Forså
- Location within Troms Location within Norway
- Coordinates: 68.7439°N 16.9830°E
- Country: Norway
- Region: Northern Norway
- County: Troms
- District: Central Hålogaland
- Municipality: Ibestad Municipality
- Elevation: 63 m (207 ft)
- Time zone: UTC+01:00 (CET)
  - Summer (DST): UTC+02:00 (CEST)
- Post Code: 9450 Hamnvik

Forså is a village in Ibestad Municipality in Troms county, Norway. The village is located along the Astafjorden on the south side of the island of Rolla, about half-way between the villages of Sørrollnes and Hamnvik.
