= Astafjord =

Astafjord may refer to:

== Places ==
- Astafjorden, a fjord in Troms county, Norway
- Astafjord Municipality, a former municipality in Troms county, Norway
- Astafjord Church, a church in Tjeldsund Municipality in Troms county, Norway

== See also ==
- Austafjord, a village in Trondelag county, Norway
