= Skånland Municipality =

Former municipality in Troms, Norway

Skånland Municipality Skånland kommune Skániid suohkan (Northern Sami)
- Former municipality
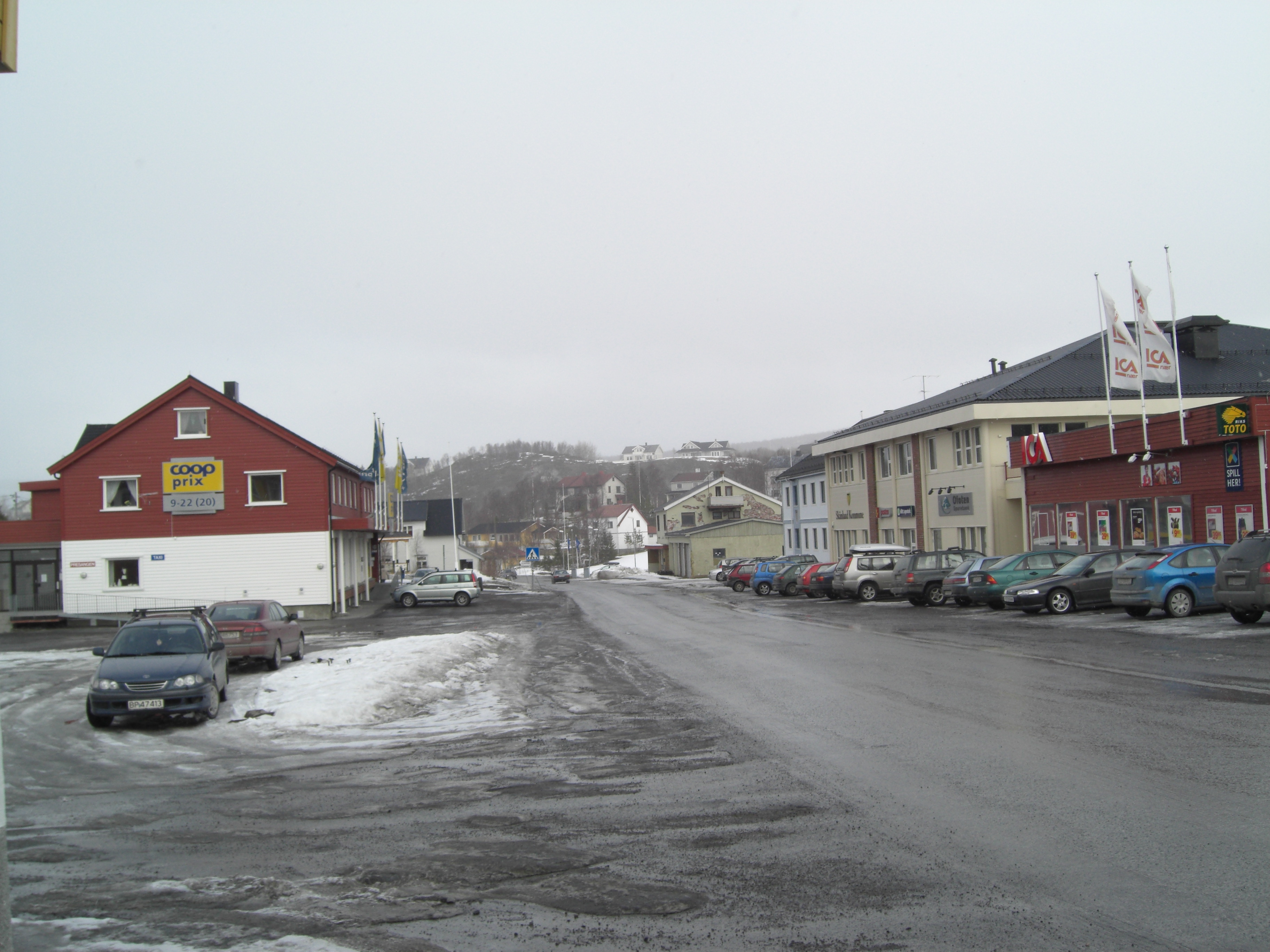
- View of Evenskjer

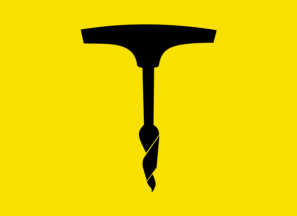
- Flag Coat of arms

- Troms within Norway

- Skånland within Troms
- Coordinates: 68°38′24″N 16°57′26″E
- Country: Norway
- County: Troms
- District: Central Hålogaland
- Established: 1 July 1926
  - Preceded by: Trondenes Municipality
- Disestablished: 1 Jan 2020
  - Succeeded by: Tjeldsund Municipality
- Administrative centre: Evenskjer

Government
  - Mayor (2015–2019): Helene Berg Nilsen (Ap)

Area (upon dissolution)
  - Total: 495.00 km^{2} (191.12 sq mi)
  - Land: 464.77 km^{2} (179.45 sq mi)
  - Water: 30.23 km^{2} (11.67 sq mi) 6.1%
  - Rank: #210 in Norway
- Highest elevation: 1,305.9 m (4,284 ft)

Population (2019)
  - Total: 3,009
  - Rank: #264 in Norway
  - Density: 6.1/km^{2} (16/sq mi)
  - Change (10 years): ▲ +5.9%
- Demonym: Skånlending

Official language
  - Norwegian form: Bokmål
- Time zone: UTC+01:00 (CET)
  - Summer (DST): UTC+02:00 (CEST)
- ISO 3166 code: NO-1913

Skånland (Northern Sami: Skánik) is a former municipality in Troms county, Norway. The 495-square-kilometre (191 sq mi) municipality existed from 1926 until its dissolution in 2020 when it was merged into Tjeldsund Municipality. It was part of the Central Hålogaland region, just southeast of the city of Harstad. The administrative centre of the municipality was the village of Evenskjer. Other villages included Grovfjord, Renså, Sandstrand, and Tovik.

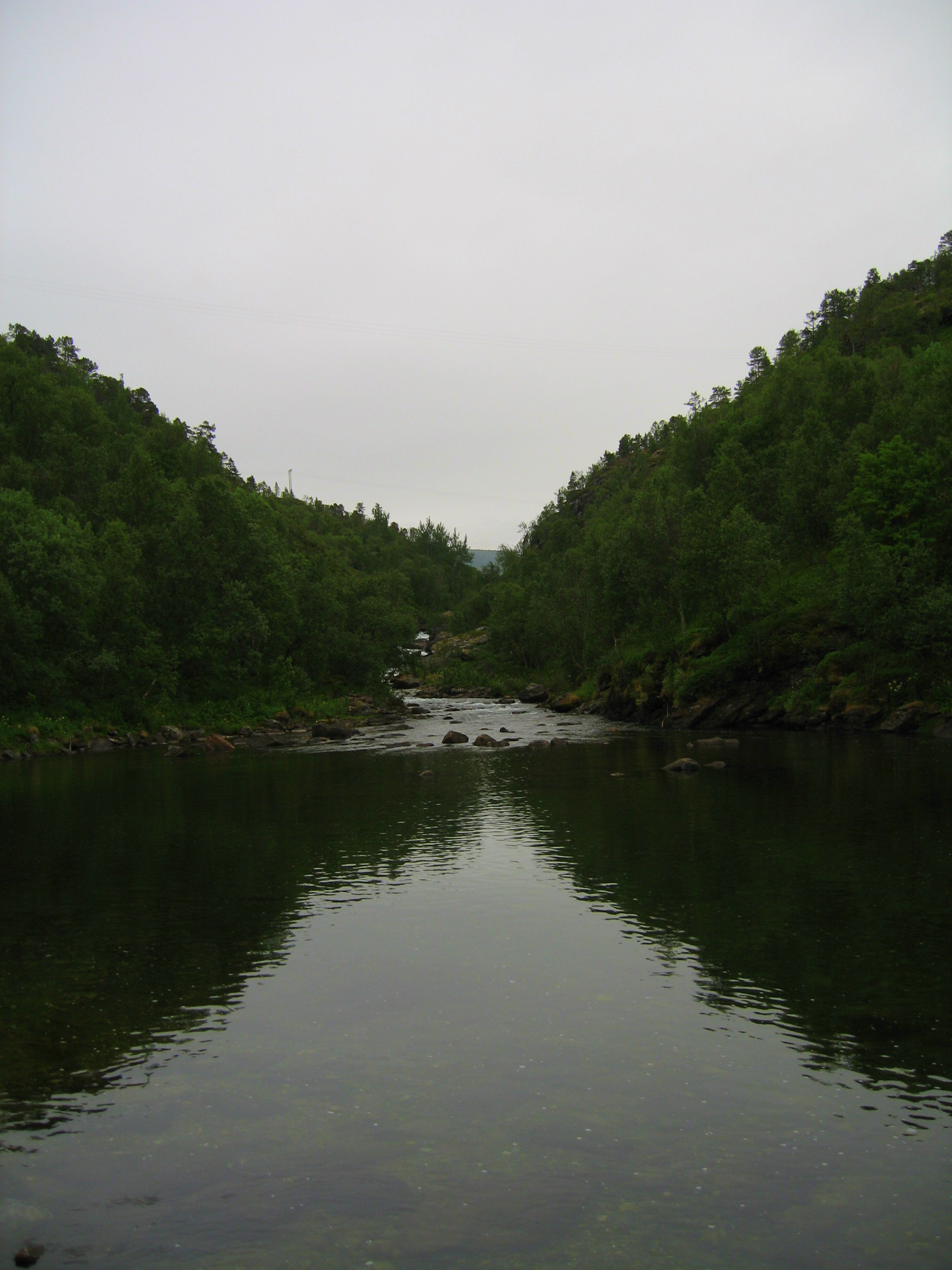
The river Tennevikelva, Skånland.

Prior to its dissolution in 2020, the 495-square-kilometre (191 sq mi) municipality was the 210th largest by area out of the 422 municipalities in Norway. Skånland Municipality was the 264th most populous municipality in Norway with a population of 3,009. The municipality's population density was 6.1 inhabitants per square kilometre (16/sq mi) and its population had increased by 5.9% over the previous 10-year period.

The Tjeldsund Bridge in Skånland connects the island of Hinnøya (the largest coastal island in Norway) to the Norwegian mainland.

== General information ==
Skånland Municipality was established on 1 July 1926 when the large Trondenes Municipality was divided into three municipalities: Sandtorg Municipality (population: 4,224) in the southwest, Skånland Municipality (population: 2,443) in the southeast, and Trondenes Municipality (population: 3,429) in the north. During the 1960s, there were many municipal mergers across Norway due to the work of the Schei Committee. On 1 January 1964, the neighboring Astafjord Municipality (population: 1,120) was merged into Skånland. On the same date, the part of Skånland on the island of Rolla (population: 143) was transferred to the neighboring Ibestad Municipality.

On 1 January 2020, Skånland Municipality was merged into the neighboring Tjeldsund Municipality, the newly merged municipality became part of Troms county (since Tjeldsund Municipality was in Nordland county and Skånland Municipality was in Troms county prior to the merger).

=== Name ===
The municipality (originally the parish) is named after the old Skånland farm (Old Norse: Skánøyjarland) since this was where the first Skånland Church was built in 1870. The first element is the genitive case of an old name for the area (Skánøy). The meaning of this name is uncertain, but it may be of Sami origin, meaning "small mountains" (skánit). The last element is land which means "land" or "farm".

=== Coat of arms ===
The coat of arms was granted on 19 August 1988 and it was used until 1 January 2020 when the municipality was dissolved. The official blazon is "Or an auger drill sable" (Norwegian: I gull en svart navar). This means the arms have a field (background) with a tincture of Or which means it is commonly colored yellow, but if it is made out of metal, then gold is used. The charge is an auger with a tincture of sable. The auger was chosen for the design in order to represent boat building, an industry with long roots in the municipality. The arms were designed by Arvid Sveen.

=== Churches ===
The Church of Norway had three parishes (sokn) within Skånland Municipality. At the time of the municipal dissolution, it was part of the Trondenes prosti (deanery) in the Diocese of Nord-Hålogaland.

Churches in Skånland Municipality
| Parish (sokn) | Church name | Location of the church | Year built |
|---|---|---|---|
| Astafjord | Astafjord Church | Grov | 1978 |
| Skånland | Skånland Church | Evenskjer | 1901 |
| Tovik | Tovik Church | Tovik | 1905 |

== Economy ==
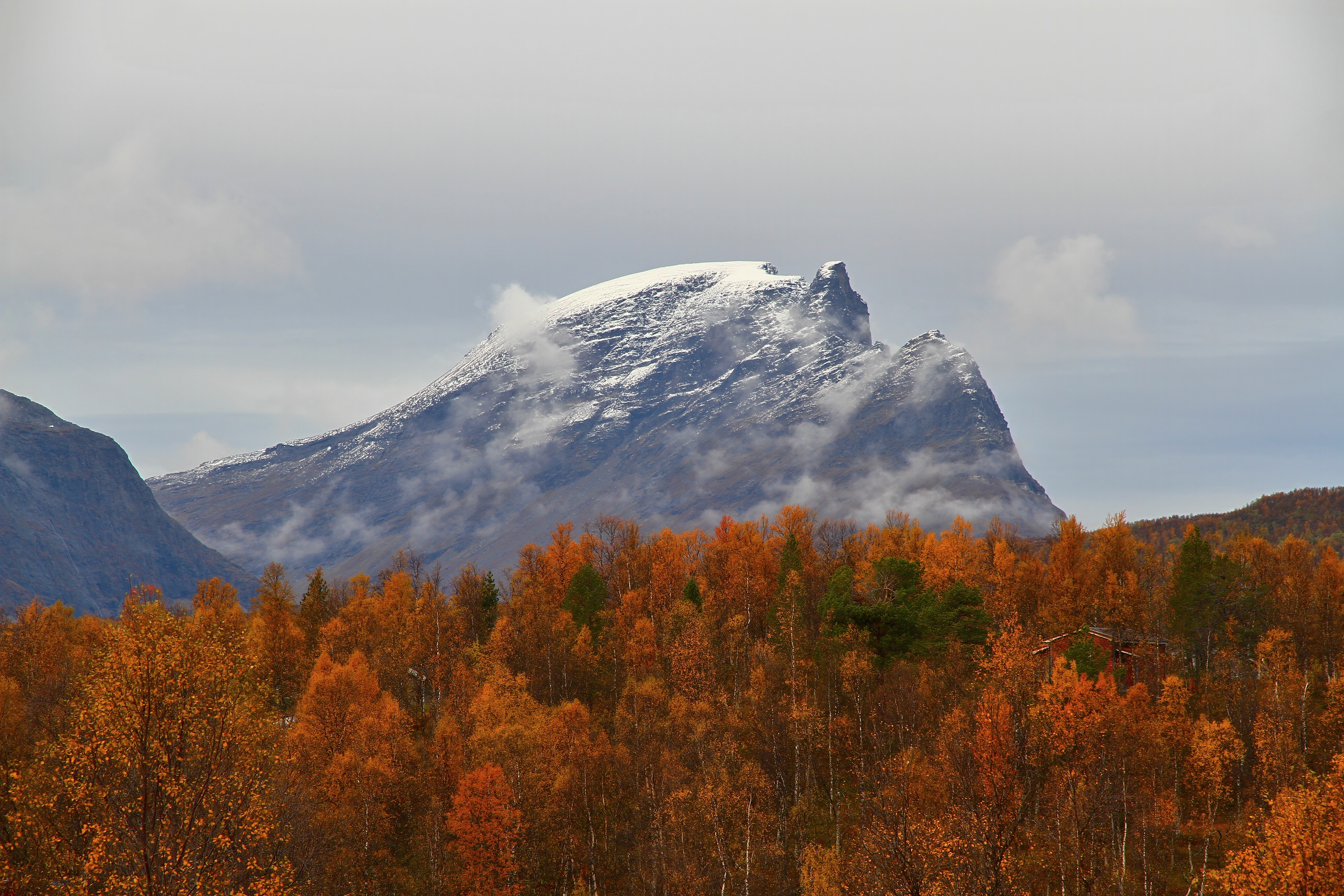
Autumn view of Novafjell (Nova mountain) in Skånland

Agriculture was important in Skånland. There were also many people who worked in Harstad or at the nearby Harstad/Narvik Airport, Evenes.

== Geography ==
The municipality included the western and northern part of the Ofoten peninsula, which is bordered by Ofotfjord in the south, Tjeldsundet in the west, and the Astafjorden and Vågsfjorden in the north. Skånland Municipality was located north of Evenes Municipality, northwest of Narvik Municipality, and east of Tjeldsund Municipality (all three were in the neighboring Nordland county). Harstad Municipality was located to the northwest (across the Tjeldsundet) and Gratangen Municipality was to the northeast (both were located in Troms county). The village of Evenskjer, located in the lowland bordering the Tjeldsundet strait, was the largest village. In the northern part of Skånland was the smaller village of Grov. Other villages were Renså, Tovik and Sandstrand.

The largest lake was Skoddebergvatnet, and the highest mountain was Skittendalstinden at 1,306 metres (4,285 ft) in the mountainous center of the peninsula. There were calcareous pine forests near Skoddebergvatnet. The lake Niingsvatnet was located on the border with Evenes Municipality. The highest point in the municipality is the 1,305.9-metre (4,284 ft) tall mountain Skittendalstinden.

=== Climate ===
Climate data for Evenskjer 1961-1990
| Month | Jan | Feb | Mar | Apr | May | Jun | Jul | Aug | Sep | Oct | Nov | Dec | Year |
|---|---|---|---|---|---|---|---|---|---|---|---|---|---|
| Mean daily maximum °C (°F) | −1.1 (30.0) | −0.9 (30.4) | 0.9 (33.6) | 4.2 (39.6) | 9.6 (49.3) | 13.4 (56.1) | 15.9 (60.6) | 15.0 (59.0) | 10.8 (51.4) | 6.2 (43.2) | 2.2 (36.0) | 0.2 (32.4) | 6.4 (43.5) |
| Daily mean °C (°F) | −3.7 (25.3) | −3.4 (25.9) | −1.7 (28.9) | 1.6 (34.9) | 6.4 (43.5) | 10.0 (50.0) | 12.4 (54.3) | 11.9 (53.4) | 8.0 (46.4) | 4.0 (39.2) | −0.1 (31.8) | −2.6 (27.3) | 3.6 (38.5) |
| Mean daily minimum °C (°F) | −6.8 (19.8) | −6.5 (20.3) | −5.0 (23.0) | −1.6 (29.1) | 2.7 (36.9) | 6.8 (44.2) | 9.2 (48.6) | 8.4 (47.1) | 4.8 (40.6) | 1.1 (34.0) | −2.9 (26.8) | −5.3 (22.5) | 0.4 (32.7) |
| Average precipitation mm (inches) | 77 (3.0) | 69 (2.7) | 57 (2.2) | 46 (1.8) | 39 (1.5) | 42 (1.7) | 64 (2.5) | 67 (2.6) | 74 (2.9) | 103 (4.1) | 77 (3.0) | 85 (3.3) | 800 (31.5) |
| Average precipitation days (≥ 1 mm) | 13.9 | 13.8 | 12.6 | 10.2 | 8.4 | 11.0 | 13.6 | 13.5 | 15.2 | 15.8 | 13.8 | 15.0 | 156.8 |
Source: Norwegian Meteorological Institute

== Government ==
While it existed, Skånland Municipality was responsible for primary education (through 10th grade), outpatient health services, senior citizen services, welfare and other social services, zoning, economic development, and municipal roads and utilities. The municipality was governed by a municipal council of directly elected representatives. The mayor was indirectly elected by a vote of the municipal council. The municipality was under the jurisdiction of the Trondenes District Court and the Hålogaland Court of Appeal.

=== Municipal council ===
The municipal council (Kommunestyre) of Skånland Municipality was made up of 15 representatives that were elected to four year terms. The tables below show the historical composition of the council by political party.

Skånland kommunestyre 2015–2019
| Party name (in Norwegian) | Number of representatives |
|---|---|
| Labour Party (Arbeiderpartiet) | 6 |
| Conservative Party (Høyre) | 6 |
| Red Party (Rødt) | 1 |
| Socialist Left Party (Sosialistisk Venstreparti) | 1 |
| Liberal Party (Venstre) | 1 |
| Total number of members: | 15 |
Note: On 1 January 2020, Skånland Municipality became part of Tjeldsund Municipality.

Skånland kommunestyre 2011–2015
| Party name (in Norwegian) | Number of representatives |
|---|---|
| Labour Party (Arbeiderpartiet) | 6 |
| Conservative Party (Høyre) | 6 |
| Red Party (Rødt) | 1 |
| Liberal Party (Venstre) | 2 |
| Total number of members: | 15 |

Skånland kommunestyre 2007–2011
| Party name (in Norwegian) | Number of representatives |
|---|---|
| Labour Party (Arbeiderpartiet) | 6 |
| Conservative Party (Høyre) | 5 |
| Christian Democratic Party (Kristelig Folkeparti) | 1 |
| Centre Party (Senterpartiet) | 1 |
| Socialist Left Party (Sosialistisk Venstreparti) | 1 |
| Liberal Party (Venstre) | 1 |
| Total number of members: | 15 |

Skånland kommunestyre 2003–2007
| Party name (in Norwegian) | Number of representatives |
|---|---|
| Labour Party (Arbeiderpartiet) | 6 |
| Progress Party (Fremskrittspartiet) | 1 |
| Conservative Party (Høyre) | 4 |
| Christian Democratic Party (Kristelig Folkeparti) | 1 |
| Centre Party (Senterpartiet) | 1 |
| Socialist Left Party (Sosialistisk Venstreparti) | 2 |
| Total number of members: | 15 |

Skånland kommunestyre 1999–2003
| Party name (in Norwegian) | Number of representatives |
|---|---|
| Labour Party (Arbeiderpartiet) | 7 |
| Conservative Party (Høyre) | 5 |
| Christian Democratic Party (Kristelig Folkeparti) | 1 |
| Centre Party (Senterpartiet) | 5 |
| Socialist Left Party (Sosialistisk Venstreparti) | 2 |
| Liberal Party (Venstre) | 1 |
| Total number of members: | 21 |

Skånland kommunestyre 1995–1999
| Party name (in Norwegian) | Number of representatives |
|---|---|
| Labour Party (Arbeiderpartiet) | 10 |
| Conservative Party (Høyre) | 7 |
| Christian Democratic Party (Kristelig Folkeparti) | 1 |
| Centre Party (Senterpartiet) | 3 |
| Socialist Left Party (Sosialistisk Venstreparti) | 1 |
| Liberal Party (Venstre) | 1 |
| Indre Grovfjord Common List (Indre Grovfjord Fellesliste) | 1 |
| Lavangseidet Common List (Lavangseidet Fellesliste) | 2 |
| Common List Kvitnes-Nordland border (Felleslisten Kvitnes-Nordland Grense) | 3 |
| Total number of members: | 29 |

Skånland kommunestyre 1991–1995
| Party name (in Norwegian) | Number of representatives |
|---|---|
| Labour Party (Arbeiderpartiet) | 10 |
| Conservative Party (Høyre) | 5 |
| Christian Democratic Party (Kristelig Folkeparti) | 1 |
| Socialist Left Party (Sosialistisk Venstreparti) | 2 |
| Liberal Party (Venstre) | 1 |
| Indre Grovfjord Common List (Indre Grovfjord Fellesliste) | 1 |
| Lavangseidet Common List (Lavangseidet Fellesliste) | 3 |
| Common List Kvitnes-Nordland border (Felleslisten Kvitnes-Nordland Grense) | 6 |
| Total number of members: | 29 |

Skånland kommunestyre 1987–1991
| Party name (in Norwegian) | Number of representatives |
|---|---|
| Labour Party (Arbeiderpartiet) | 12 |
| Conservative Party (Høyre) | 6 |
| Socialist Left Party (Sosialistisk Venstreparti) | 1 |
| Liberal Party (Venstre) | 1 |
| Common List Kvitnes-Nordland (Fellesliste Kvitnes-Nordland) | 5 |
| Lavangseidet Common List (Lavangseidet fellesliste) | 4 |
| Total number of members: | 29 |

Skånland kommunestyre 1983–1987
| Party name (in Norwegian) | Number of representatives |
|---|---|
| Labour Party (Arbeiderpartiet) | 14 |
| Conservative Party (Høyre) | 7 |
| Christian Democratic Party (Kristelig Folkeparti) | 2 |
| Centre Party (Senterpartiet) | 1 |
| Socialist Left Party (Sosialistisk Venstreparti) | 1 |
| Liberal Party (Venstre) | 1 |
| Lavangseidet's Common List (Lavangseidets fellesliste) | 3 |
| Total number of members: | 29 |

Skånland kommunestyre 1979–1983
| Party name (in Norwegian) | Number of representatives |
|---|---|
| Labour Party (Arbeiderpartiet) | 11 |
| Socialist Left Party (Sosialistisk Venstreparti) | 1 |
| Liberal Party (Venstre) | 3 |
| Joint list of the Conservative Party (Høyre), Christian Democratic Party (Kristelig Folkeparti), and Centre Party (Senterpartiet) | 10 |
| Lavangseidet's Common List (Lavangseidets fellesliste) | 4 |
| Total number of members: | 29 |

Skånland kommunestyre 1975–1979
| Party name (in Norwegian) | Number of representatives |
|---|---|
| Labour Party (Arbeiderpartiet) | 12 |
| Christian Democratic Party (Kristelig Folkeparti) | 2 |
| Joint List(s) of Non-Socialist Parties (Borgerlige Felleslister) | 7 |
| Grovfjord Non-party Common List (Grovfjord Upolitiske Fellesliste) | 6 |
| Lavangseidet Common List (Lavangseidet Fellesliste) | 2 |
| Total number of members: | 29 |

Skånland kommunestyre 1971–1975
| Party name (in Norwegian) | Number of representatives |
|---|---|
| Local List(s) (Lokale lister) | 29 |
| Total number of members: | 29 |

Skånland kommunestyre 1967–1971
| Party name (in Norwegian) | Number of representatives |
|---|---|
| Local List(s) (Lokale lister) | 29 |
| Total number of members: | 29 |

Skånland kommunestyre 1963–1967
| Party name (in Norwegian) | Number of representatives |
|---|---|
| Local List(s) (Lokale lister) | 29 |
| Total number of members: | 29 |

Skånland herredsstyre 1959–1963
| Party name (in Norwegian) | Number of representatives |
|---|---|
| Labour Party (Arbeiderpartiet) | 3 |
| List of workers, fishermen, and small farmholders (Arbeidere, fiskere, småbrukere liste) | 1 |
| Joint List(s) of Non-Socialist Parties (Borgerlige Felleslister) | 3 |
| Local List(s) (Lokale lister) | 12 |
| Total number of members: | 19 |

Skånland herredsstyre 1955–1959
| Party name (in Norwegian) | Number of representatives |
|---|---|
| Labour Party (Arbeiderpartiet) | 4 |
| Joint List(s) of Non-Socialist Parties (Borgerlige Felleslister) | 2 |
| Local List(s) (Lokale lister) | 13 |
| Total number of members: | 19 |

Skånland herredsstyre 1951–1955
| Party name (in Norwegian) | Number of representatives |
|---|---|
| Labour Party (Arbeiderpartiet) | 2 |
| Local List(s) (Lokale lister) | 14 |
| Total number of members: | 16 |

Skånland herredsstyre 1947–1951
| Party name (in Norwegian) | Number of representatives |
|---|---|
| Labour Party (Arbeiderpartiet) | 3 |
| List of workers, fishermen, and small farmholders (Arbeidere, fiskere, småbrukere liste) | 1 |
| Joint List(s) of Non-Socialist Parties (Borgerlige Felleslister) | 5 |
| Local List(s) (Lokale lister) | 7 |
| Total number of members: | 16 |

Skånland herredsstyre 1945–1947
| Party name (in Norwegian) | Number of representatives |
|---|---|
| Labour Party (Arbeiderpartiet) | 9 |
| Joint List(s) of Non-Socialist Parties (Borgerlige Felleslister) | 2 |
| Local List(s) (Lokale lister) | 5 |
| Total number of members: | 16 |

Skånland herredsstyre 1937–1941*
| Party name (in Norwegian) | Number of representatives |
|---|---|
| Labour Party (Arbeiderpartiet) | 10 |
| Joint List(s) of Non-Socialist Parties (Borgerlige Felleslister) | 3 |
| Local List(s) (Lokale lister) | 3 |
| Total number of members: | 16 |
Note: Due to the German occupation of Norway during World War II, no elections were held for new municipal councils until after the war ended in 1945.

=== Mayors ===
The mayor (Norwegian: ordfører) of Skånland Municipality was the political leader of the municipality and the chairperson of the municipal council. Here is a list of people who have held this position:

- 1926–1945: Albert Isaksen
- 1945–1945: Tonning Larsen
- 1946–1947: Robert Mathisen
- 1948–1958: Martin Svendsen
- 1958–1959: Sigvart Isaksen
- 1960–1963: Herleif Grøneng
- 1964–1967: Peder Ellefsen
- 1968–1975: Herleif Grøneng
- 1976–1979: Aage Olsen
- 1980–1991: Odd Nilssen (Ap)
- 1992–1997: Håkon Walter Brox (H)
- 1997–2002: Terje Fjordbakk (Sp)
- 2002–2011: Svein Berg (Ap)
- 2011–2015: Einar Aune (H)
- 2015–2019: Helene Berg Nilsen (Ap)

== See also ==
- List of former municipalities of Norway
