= Forsa =

Forsa may refer to:

== Places ==
- Forsa Court District, an administrative district of Hälsingland in Sweden
- Forsa, Hälsingland, a community in Hälsingland, Sweden
- Forsa (Gotland), on Gotland, an island and province of Sweden
- Forså, a village in Troms, Norway
- Forssa, a municipality of Kanta-Häme, Finland

== Other ==
- Federation of Russian Workers of South America, association of Russian migrants in Argentina
- Forsa Institute, a German market research and opinion polling company
- Fórsa, the largest public service union in Ireland
- Suzuki Forsa, a car
