= Langlitinden =

Mountain in Ibestad Municipality, Norway

- Interactive map of the mountain

Highest point
- Elevation: 1,276 m (4,186 ft)
- Prominence: 1,276 m (4,186 ft)
- Isolation: 30.1 to 30.3 km (18.7 to 18.8 mi)
- Listing: 15 at List of mountains in Norway by prominence
- Coordinates: 68.8679°N 17.3874°E

Geography
- Location: Troms, Norway
- Topo map: 1332 I Andørja

Langlitinden is the highest mountain on the island of Andørja and is also the highest mountain on any Norwegian island (except Beerenberg, Jan Mayen). It is located on the northeastern part of the island in Ibestad Municipality in Troms county, Norway, just to the south of the Mjøsund Bridge and just northwest of the shore of the Astafjorden. The mountain is 1,276 m (4,186 ft) tall.
