= Astafjord Municipality =

Former municipality in Troms, Norway

Astafjord Municipality Astafjord herred
- Former municipality
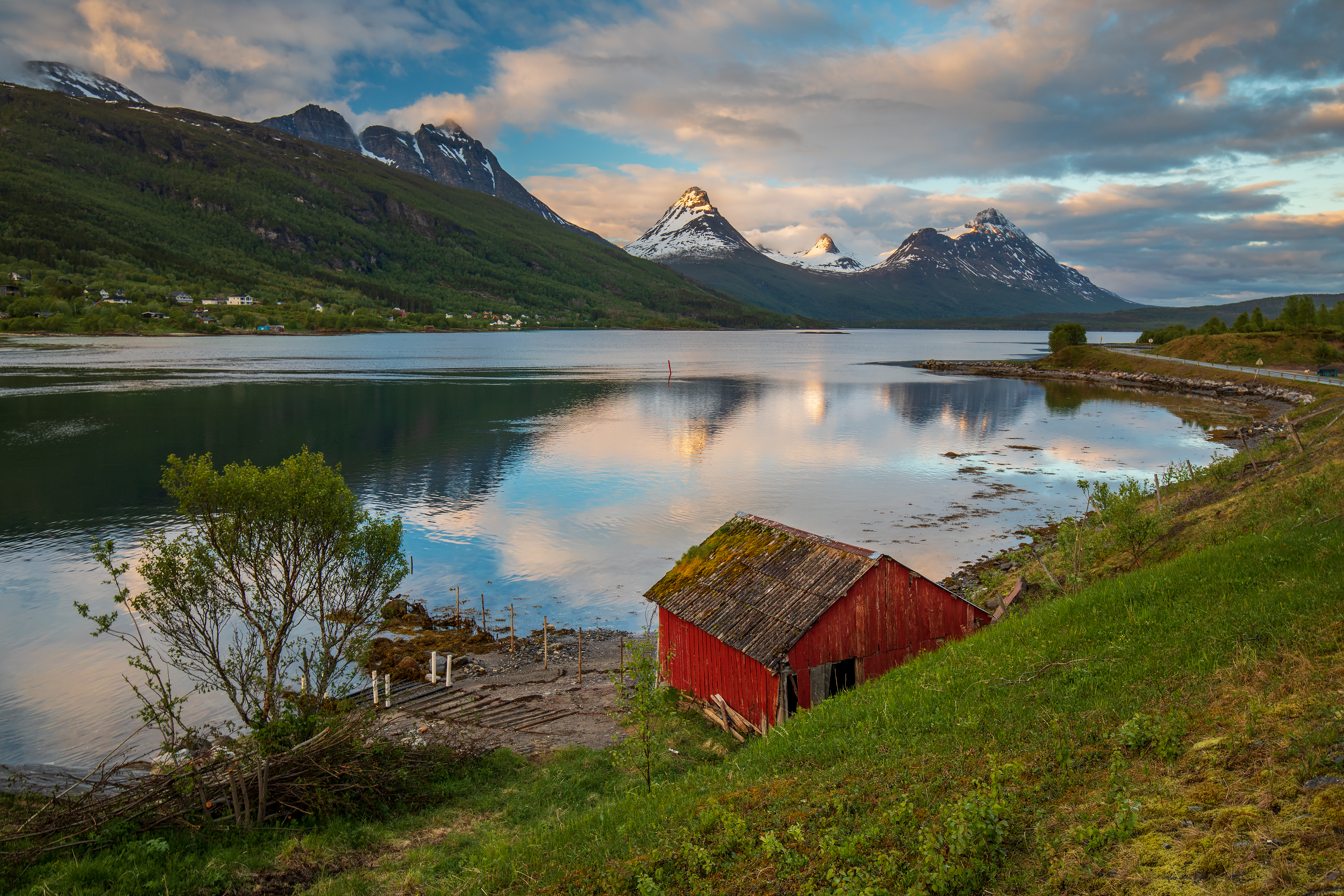

- Troms within Norway

- Astafjord within Troms
- Coordinates: 68°40′29″N 17°07′28″E
- Country: Norway
- County: Troms
- District: Central Hålogaland
- Established: 1 July 1926
  - Preceded by: Ibestad Municipality
- Disestablished: 1 Jan 1964
  - Succeeded by: Skånland Municipality
- Administrative centre: Grov

Government
  - Mayor (1946-1963): Peder Ellefsen

Area (upon dissolution)
  - Total: 310.1 km^{2} (119.7 sq mi)
  - Rank: #277 in Norway
- Highest elevation: 1,305.9 m (4,284 ft)

Population (1963)
  - Total: 1,126
  - Rank: #595 in Norway
  - Density: 3.6/km^{2} (9.3/sq mi)
  - Change (10 years): ▼ −2.3%
- Demonym: Astafjord-folk

Official language
  - Norwegian form: Neutral
- Time zone: UTC+01:00 (CET)
  - Summer (DST): UTC+02:00 (CEST)
- ISO 3166 code: NO-1918

Astafjord is a former municipality in Troms county, Norway. The 310.1-square-kilometre (119.7 sq mi) municipality existed from 1926 until its dissolution in 1964. The area now makes up the eastern part of Tjeldsund Municipality, surrounding the Grovfjorden. The administrative center of the former municipality was the village of Grov where Astafjord Church is located. The Astafjorden (strait) flowed along the northern part of the municipality and it was the namesake for the municipality.

Prior to its dissolution in 1964, the 310.1-square-kilometre (119.7 sq mi) municipality was the 277th largest by area out of the 689 municipalities in Norway. Astafjord Municipality was the 595th most populous municipality in Norway with a population of about 1,126. The municipality's population density was 3.6 inhabitants per square kilometre (9.3/sq mi) and its population had decreased by 2.3% over the previous 10-year period.

== General information ==
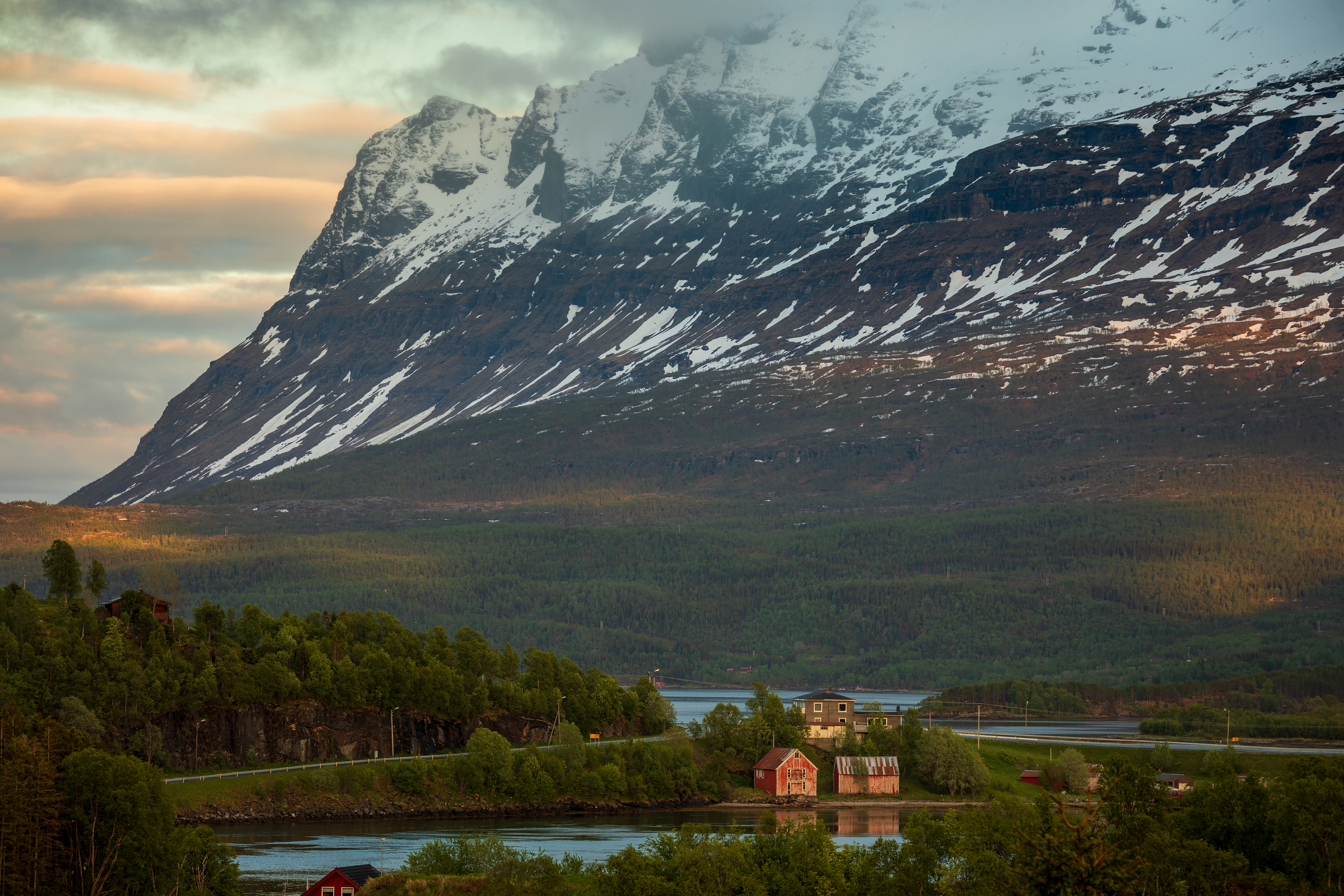
View of Grov in Astafjord

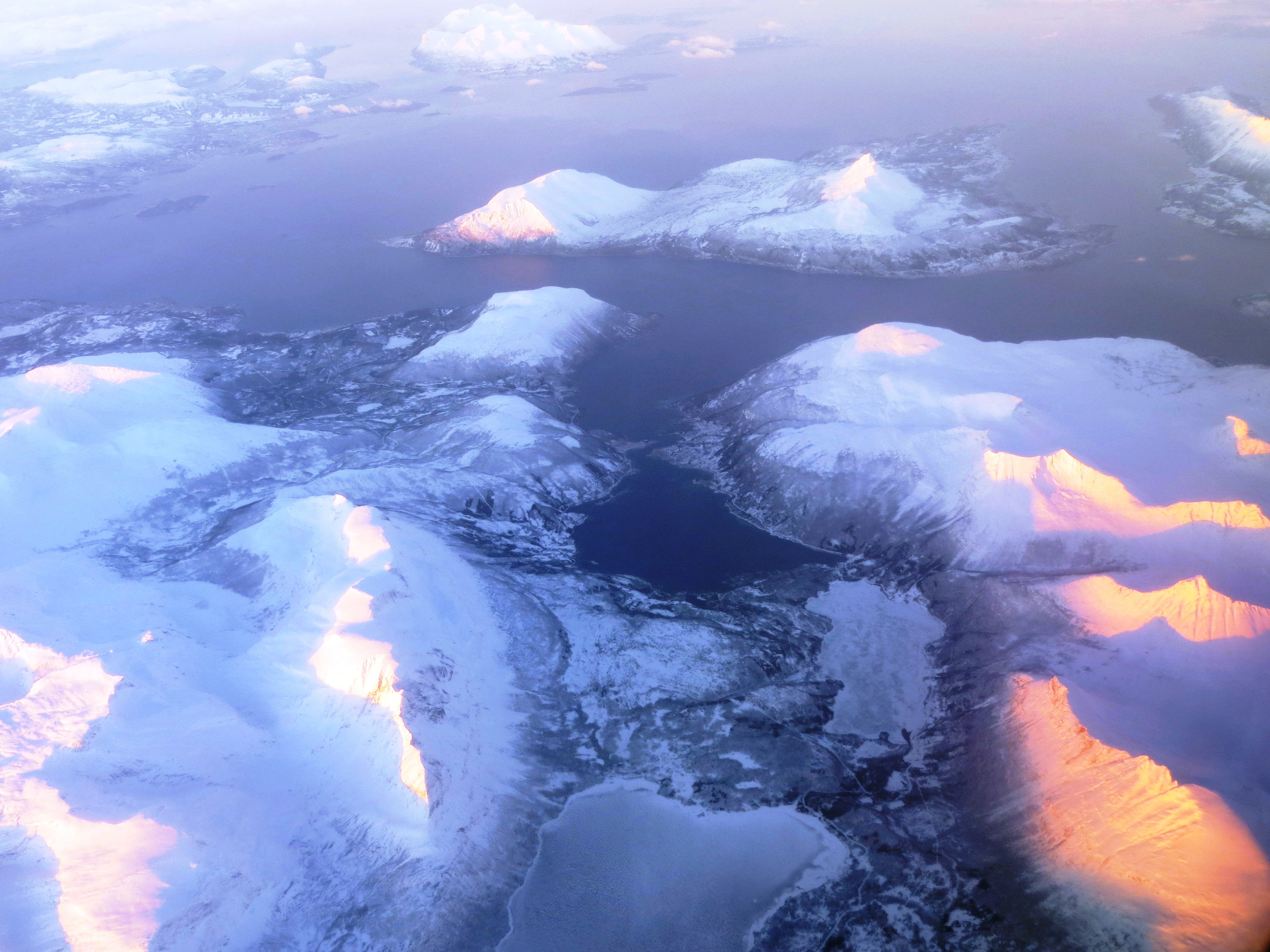
Aerial view of Astafjord (valley in the central foreground)

Historically, Astafjord was a prestegjeld that encompassed a large part of southern Troms county, including the present-day municipalities of Bardu, Gratangen, Ibestad, Lavangen, Salangen, and most of Tjeldsund. When municipalities were created in Norway in 1838, the old parish was created as Ibestad Municipality (see formannskapsdistrikt law).

Astafjord Municipality was established on 1 July 1926 when the large Ibestad Municipality was separated into four municipalities: Ibestad Municipality (population: 1,768), Andørja Municipality (population: 1,420), Astafjord Municipality (population: 1,018), and Gratangen Municipality (population: 1,967). During the 1960s, there were many municipal mergers across Norway due to the work of the Schei Committee. On 1 January 1964, Astafjord (population: 1,120) was merged with the part of Skånland Municipality on the mainland (population: 2,246) to create a new larger Skånland Municipality (the rest of the old Skånland on the island of Rolla joined Ibestad Municipality).

=== Name ===
The municipality was named after the Astafjorden strait which was named after the old Ånstad farm (Old Norse: Arnastaðafjǫrðr). The first element of the old name comes from the male name Arna or "Arne", the second element staða means "home" or "farm", and the last element fjǫrðr is identical with the word for "fjord". Thus, the name literally means the "fjord by Arne's farm".

=== Churches ===
The Church of Norway did not have any churches within Astafjord Municipality. At the time of the municipal dissolution, it was part of the Skånland Church prestegjeld within the Trondenes prosti (deanery) in the Diocese of Nord-Hålogaland.

== Geography ==
The highest point in the municipality is the 1,305.9-metre (4,284 ft) tall mountain Skittendalstinden.

== Government ==
While it existed, Astafjord Municipality was responsible for primary education (through 10th grade), outpatient health services, senior citizen services, welfare and other social services, zoning, economic development, and municipal roads and utilities. The municipality was governed by a municipal council of directly elected representatives. The mayor was indirectly elected by a vote of the municipal council. The municipality was under the jurisdiction of the Hålogaland Court of Appeal.

=== Municipal council ===
The municipal council (Herredsstyre) of Astafjord Municipality was made up of 15 representatives that were elected to four year terms. The tables below show the historical composition of the council by political party.

Astafjord herredsstyre 1959–1963
Party name (in Norwegian)	Number of representatives
List of workers, fishermen, and small farmholders (Arbeidere, fiskere, småbrukere liste)	7
Local List(s) (Lokale lister)	8
Total number of members:	15
Note: On 1 January 1964, Astafjord Municipality became part of Skånland Municipality.

Astafjord herredsstyre 1955–1959
Party name (in Norwegian)	Number of representatives
Communist Party (Kommunistiske Parti)	1
Local List(s) (Lokale lister)	14
Total number of members:	15

Astafjord herredsstyre 1951–1955
Party name (in Norwegian)	Number of representatives
List of workers, fishermen, and small farmholders (Arbeidere, fiskere, småbrukere liste)	3
Joint List(s) of Non-Socialist Parties (Borgerlige Felleslister)	2
Local List(s) (Lokale lister)	7
Total number of members:	12

Astafjord herredsstyre 1947–1951
Party name (in Norwegian)	Number of representatives
Labour Party (Arbeiderpartiet)	3
Local List(s) (Lokale lister)	9
Total number of members:	12

Astafjord herredsstyre 1945–1947
Party name (in Norwegian)	Number of representatives
Labour Party (Arbeiderpartiet)	4
List of workers, fishermen, and small farmholders (Arbeidere, fiskere, småbrukere liste)	5
Local List(s) (Lokale lister)	3
Total number of members:	12

Astafjord herredsstyre 1937–1941*
Party name (in Norwegian)	Number of representatives
List of workers, fishermen, and small farmholders (Arbeidere, fiskere, småbrukere liste)	3
Local List(s) (Lokale lister)	9
Total number of members:	12
Note: Due to the German occupation of Norway during World War II, no elections were held for new municipal councils until after the war ended in 1945.

=== Mayors ===
The mayor (Norwegian: ordfører) of Astafjord Municipality was the political leader of the municipality and the chairperson of the municipal council. Here is a list of people who have held this position:

- 1926–1929: Martin Rasmussen
- 1929–1932: Viggo Tande
- 1933–1942: Hartvik Nilsen
- 1945–1945: Viggo Tande
- 1945–1945: Peder Dyrstad
- 1946–1963: Peder Ellefsen

== See also ==
- List of former municipalities of Norway
