= Vågsfjorden =

Vågsfjorden may refer to:

- Vågsfjorden, Troms, a 46-kilometre (29 mi) long fjord in Troms county, Norway
- Vågsfjorden, Sogn og Fjordane, an 8.5-kilometre (5.3 mi) long branch of the Nordfjord in Sogn og Fjordane county, Norway
