= Sørrollnes Chapel =

- Sørrollnes kapell
- Sørrollnes Chapel
- 68.72843192°N 16.8301185°E
- Location: Ibestad Municipality, Troms
- Country: Norway
- Denomination: Church of Norway
- Churchmanship: Evangelical Lutheran

History
- Status: Chapel
- Founded: 1976
- Consecrated: 1976

Architecture
- Functional status: Active
- Architectural type: Long church
- Completed: 1976 (50 years ago)

Specifications
- Capacity: 85
- Materials: Wood

Administration
- Diocese: Nord-Hålogaland
- Deanery: Trondenes prosti
- Parish: Ibestad

Sørrollnes Chapel (Norwegian: Sørrollnes kapell) is a chapel of the Church of Norway in Ibestad Municipality in Troms county, Norway. It is located in the village of Sørrollnes, serving the western part of the island of Rolla. It is an annex chapel for the Ibestad parish which is part of the Trondenes prosti (deanery) in the Diocese of Nord-Hålogaland. The gray, wooden chapel was built in a long church style in 1976. The chapel seats about 85 people.

== See also ==
- List of churches in Nord-Hålogaland
