= Andørja (island) =

Island in Troms, Norway

Andørja (Norwegian) Áttir (Northern Sami)
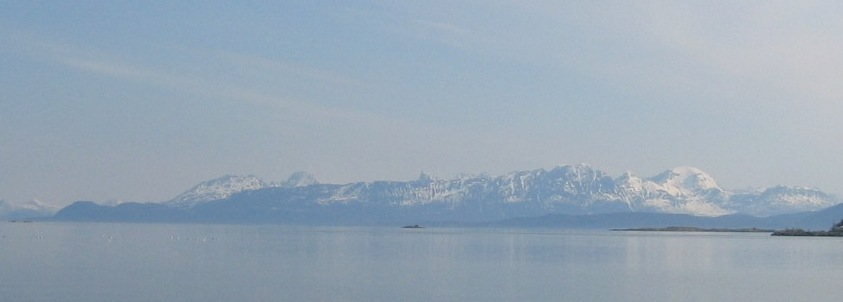
- View of the island (seen from Harstad)
- Interactive map of Andørja (Norwegian); Áttir (Northern Sami)

Geography
- Location: Troms, Norway
- Coordinates: 68.8149°N 17.2948°E
- Area: 135 km^{2} (52 sq mi)
- Length: 15 km (9.3 mi)
- Width: 14.5 km (9.01 mi)
- Highest elevation: 1,276 m (4186 ft)
- Highest point: Langlitinden

Administration
- Norway
- County: Troms
- Municipality: Ibestad Municipality

Demographics
- Population: 205 (2001)
- Pop. density: 1.5/km^{2} (3.9/sq mi)

Andørja (Norwegian) or Áttir (Northern Sami) is an island in Ibestad Municipality in Troms county, Norway. The 135-square-kilometre (52 sq mi) island lies about 25 kilometres (16 mi) east of the town of Harstad. The island is located entirely within Ibestad Municipality, although the island itself was a separate municipality (Andørja Municipality) from 1926 until 1964. The largest population area on Andørja island is the Å - Ånstad - Laupstad area on the west coast with 205 residents (2001). Andørja Church is located in Engenes on the northwestern tip of the island.

== Geography ==
The Vågsfjorden lies to the north and west of the island and the Astafjorden flows along the southeastern coast. The Bygda strait sits between Andørja and the neighboring island of Rolla to the west and the Mjøsundet strait sits between Andørja and the Norwegian mainland to the east.

The Mjøsund Bridge connects Andørja to the mainland (across the Mjøsundet strait) and the Ibestad Tunnel is an undersea road tunnel that connects Andørja to the neighboring island of Rolla.

The highest point on the 135-square-kilometre (52 sq mi) island is the 1,276-metre (4,186 ft) tall mountain Langlitinden. In Norway proper (excluding Svalbard), this is the highest mountain situated on an island. The 8-kilometre (5.0 mi) long Straumbotn fjord cuts into the middle of the island from the north side.

== Name ==
The island is named "Andørja" (Old Norse: Andyrja). The meaning of the name is not certain, but one theory is that the first element and which means "against". The last element is yrja which means "gravel" or "rocks", possibly referring to the waves from the sea hitting against the rocky shores.

== See also ==
- List of islands of Norway
