= Sørrollnes =

Village in Ibestad Municipality, Norway

Sørrollnes (Norwegian) Orjješ-Rállegeahči (Northern Sami)
- Village
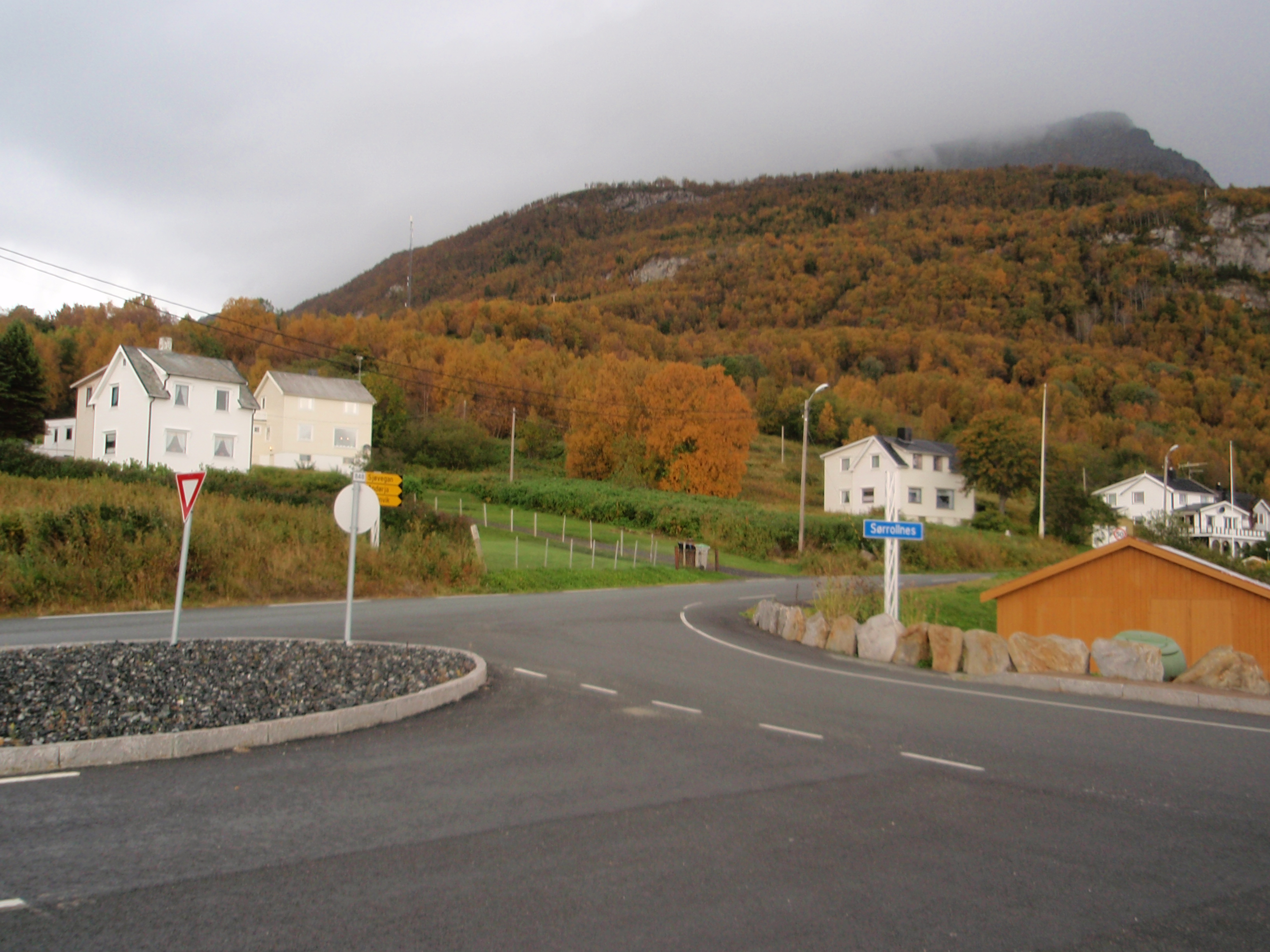
- View of the village
- Interactive map of Sørrollnes (Norwegian)
- Location within Troms Location within Norway
- Coordinates: 68°43′42″N 16°50′22″E
- Country: Norway
- Region: Northern Norway
- County: Troms
- District: Central Hålogaland
- Municipality: Ibestad Municipality
- Elevation: 17 m (56 ft)
- Time zone: UTC+01:00 (CET)
  - Summer (DST): UTC+02:00 (CEST)
- Post Code: 9450 Hamnvik

Sørrollnes (Norwegian) or Orjješ-Rállegeahči (Northern Sami) is a village in Ibestad Municipality in Troms county, Norway. It is located on the western tip of the island of Rolla. There has been regular ferry service from Sørrollnes to the town of Harstad since 1964. A new ferry port was constructed in 2006.

== History ==
Sørrollnes was originally part of Trondenes Municipality, but in 1926 it (and the whole southwestern part of the island of Rolla) became a part of the new Skånland Municipality. The road between the villages of Sørrollnes and Hamnvik was built in the late 1950s. In 1964, Sørrollnes and the surrounding area on the island of Rolla was transferred to Ibestad Municipality.
