= Grov, Troms =

Village in Tjeldsund Municipality, Norway

Grov, Troms: Grov (Norwegian); Roabadállu (Northern Sami); Grovfjord (historic name)
- Village
- Interactive map of Grov, Troms
- Location within Troms Location within Norway
- Coordinates: 68.6764°N 17.1208°E
- Country: Norway
- Region: Northern Norway
- County: Troms
- District: Central Hålogaland
- Municipality: Tjeldsund Municipality

Area
  - Total: 0.61 km^{2} (0.24 sq mi)
- Elevation: 7 m (23 ft)

Population (2023)
  - Total: 411
  - Density: 674/km^{2} (1,750/sq mi)
- Time zone: UTC+01:00 (CET)
  - Summer (DST): UTC+02:00 (CEST)
- Post Code: 9446 Grovfjord

Grov (Norwegian) or Roabadállu (Northern Sami) is a village in Tjeldsund Municipality in Troms county, Norway. The village is located 12 km (7.5 mi) east of the village of Tovik along the Grovfjorden at a very narrow point in the fjord. It is about 60 km (37 mi) southeast of the town of Harstad and about 71 km (44 mi) west of the town of Narvik. The Moelva and Gårdselva rivers flow through the village into the fjord. The 0.61-square-kilometre (150-acre) village has a population (2023) of 411 and a population density of 674 inhabitants per square kilometre (1,750/sq mi).

Grov is the location of the local primary and secondary schools, Astafjord Church, and a library. There are some local industries that mostly center on agriculture, fish farming, and boat building. Grov was the municipal center of the old Astafjord Municipality which existed from 1926 until 1964. The lake Skoddebergvatnet lies about 8 kilometres (5.0 mi) to the south of Grov.
