= Ibestad Church =

- Ibestad kirke
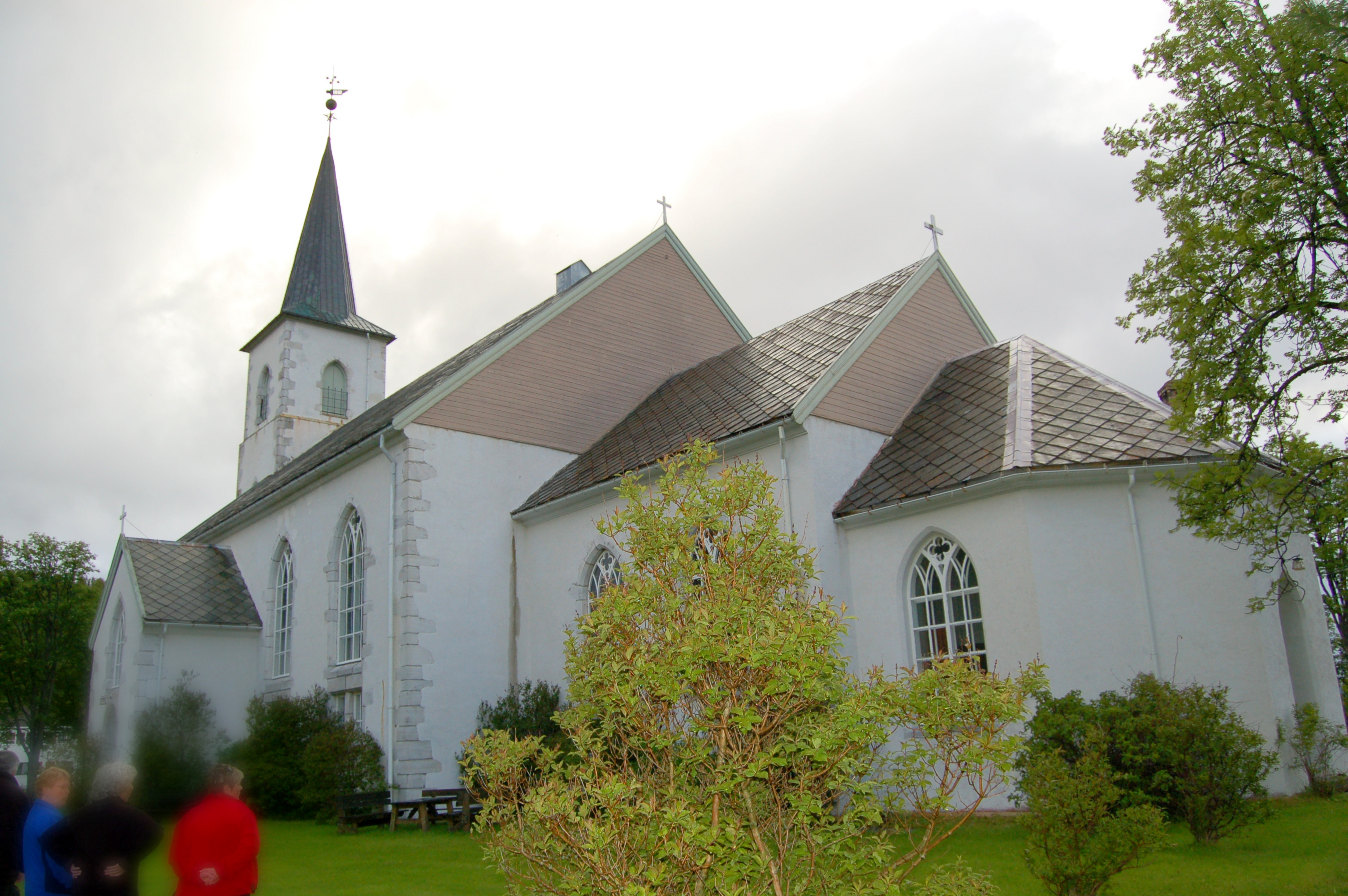
- View of the church
- Ibestad Church
- 68.7875757°N 17.1542340°E
- Location: Ibestad Municipality, Troms
- Country: Norway
- Denomination: Church of Norway
- Churchmanship: Evangelical Lutheran

History
- Status: Parish church
- Founded: 13th century
- Consecrated: 1881

Architecture
- Functional status: Active
- Architect: J. A. Johansen
- Architectural type: Long church
- Style: Neo-Gothic
- Completed: 1881 (145 years ago)

Specifications
- Capacity: 500
- Materials: Stone

Administration
- Diocese: Nord-Hålogaland
- Deanery: Trondenes prosti
- Parish: Ibestad
- Norwegian Cultural Heritage Site
- Type: Church
- Status: Listed
- ID: 84709

Ibestad Church (Norwegian: Ibestad kirke) is a parish church of the Church of Norway in Ibestad Municipality in Troms county, Norway. It is located in the village of Hamnvik in eastern part of the island of Rolla. It is the main church for the Ibestad parish which is part of the Trondenes prosti (deanery) in the Diocese of Nord-Hålogaland. The white, stone, neo-Gothic church was built in a long church style in 1881 using plans drawn up by the architect J.A. Johansen from Trondheim. The church seats about 500 people.

== History ==
The earliest existing historical records of the church date back to the year 1370, but the church was likely built years earlier during the 13th century. The medieval church was a stone building with a rectangular floor plan. The building measured about 18.7 by 12.4 metres (61 ft × 41 ft). During the 17th century, the church was described as having a small tower on the roof over the west part of the nave. In the late 1770s, the eastern wall of the church was taken down and a new choir and sacristy were added.

In 1814, this church served as an election church (Norwegian: valgkirke). Together with more than 300 other parish churches across Norway, it was a polling station for elections to the 1814 Norwegian Constituent Assembly which wrote the Constitution of Norway. This was Norway's first national elections. Each church parish was a constituency that elected people called "electors" who later met together in each county to elect the representatives for the assembly that was to meet at Eidsvoll Manor later that year.

The old stone church was torn down in 1880 and a new church was built on the same site. Much of the stone used in the new church was recycled from the older church. Part of the new foundation was reused from a previous church as well. The new church has a large steeple on the west end of the building, above the main entrance. The exterior is plastered white over the stone with ashlars showing on the corners of the building.

== See also ==
- List of churches in Nord-Hålogaland
