= Mjøsund Bridge =

Mjøsund Bridge Mjøsundbrua
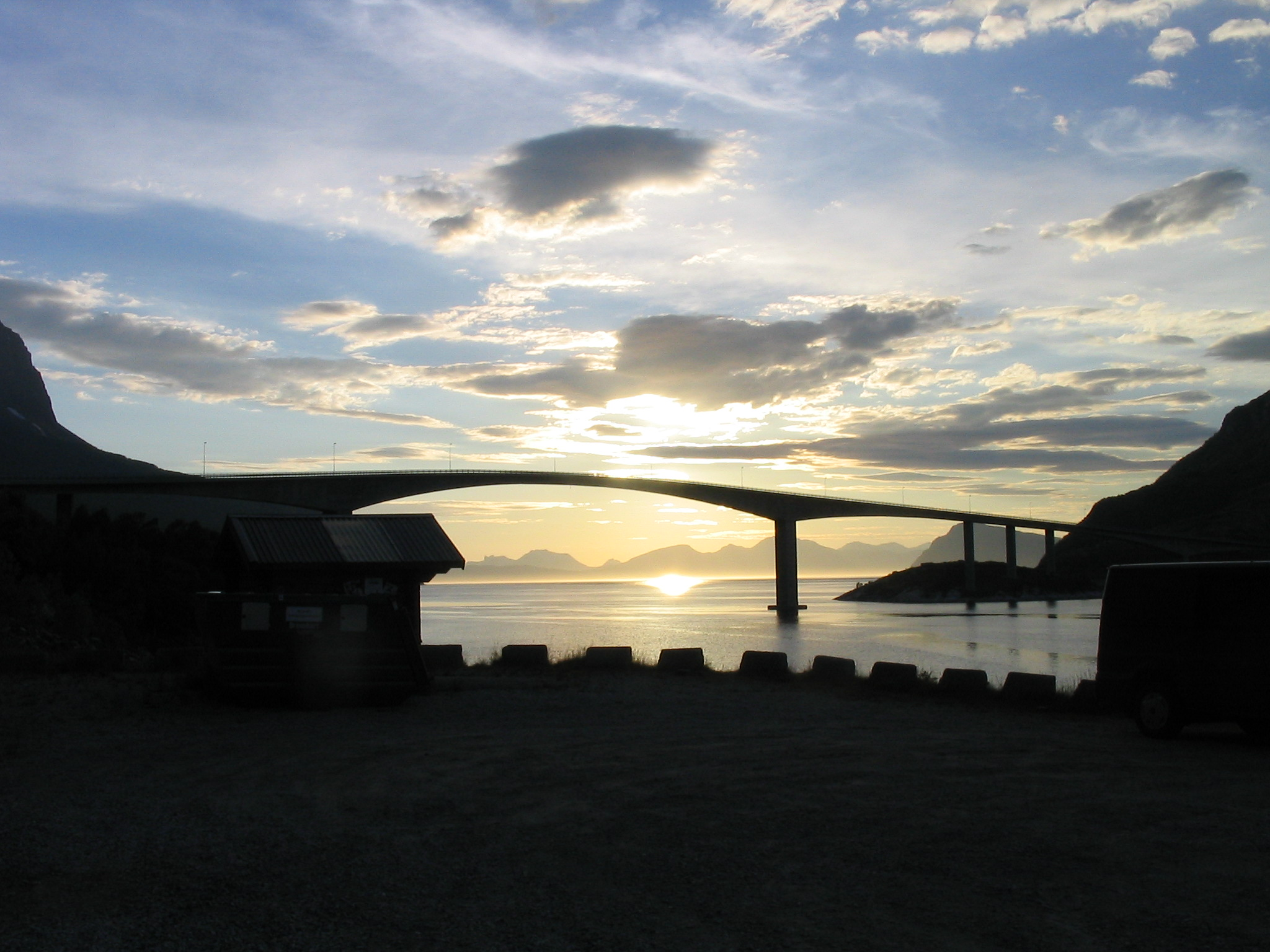
- View of the bridge at dusk
- Coordinates: 68°53′21″N 017°27′39″E
- Carries: Fv848
- Crosses: Mjøsundet
- Locale: Ibestad and Salangen, Norway

Characteristics
- Design: Cantilever
- Total length: 840 metres (2,760 ft)
- Longest span: 184.75 metres (606.1 ft)
- Clearance below: 35 metres (115 ft)

History
- Opened: 1994

Mjøsund Bridge (Norwegian: Mjøsundbrua) is a cantilever bridge in Ibestad Municipality and Salangen Municipality in Troms county, Norway. It is part of the Norwegian County Road 848 that crosses the Mjøsundet strait between the mainland of Norway and the island of Andørja. The bridge and the nearby Ibestad Tunnel connect the two main islands of Ibestad together with the mainland.

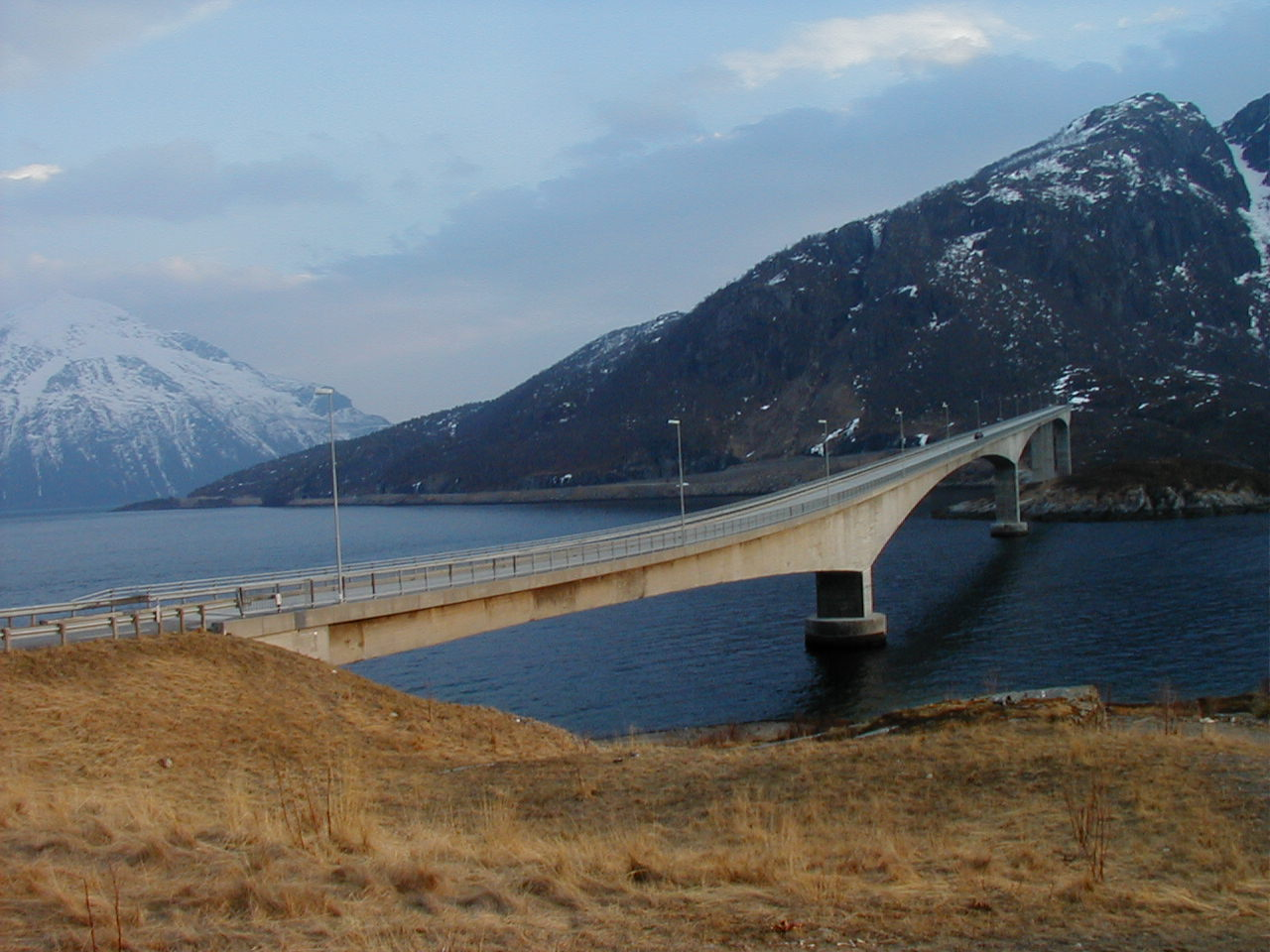
View of the bridge, looking southwest

The 840-metre (2,760 ft) long Mjøsund Bridge was opened in 1994 and it cost 203 million kr. The longest span is 184.75 metres (606.1 ft) and the clearance for boats below the bridge is 35 metres (115 ft). The bridge lies just north of where the Salangen fjord and Astafjorden meet.
