= Federation of Russian Workers of South America =

Russian immigrant organization in South America

The Federation of Russian Workers of South America (Spanish: Federación de Obreros Rusos en Sudamérica, abbreviated FORSA) was an organization of Russian immigrants in Argentina. The organization was founded in February 1918. FORSA was led by Mikhail Komin-Alexandrovsky, a member of the Russian Social Democratic Labour Party who had arrived in Argentina in 1909. FORSA existed parallel to the Russian Union of Socialist Workers (UROS), which FORSA labelled as 'Menshevik'.

FORSA published the newspaper Golos Truda ('Voice of Labour') from Buenos Aires, with Komin-Alexandrovsky as its editor. FORSA claimed to have some 15,000 members. The organization also had members in Brazil, Paraguay and Uruguay.

FORSA sent Komin-Alexandrovsky as its representative to the 2nd World Congress of the Comintern in 1920.
