= Andørja Church =

- Andørja kirke
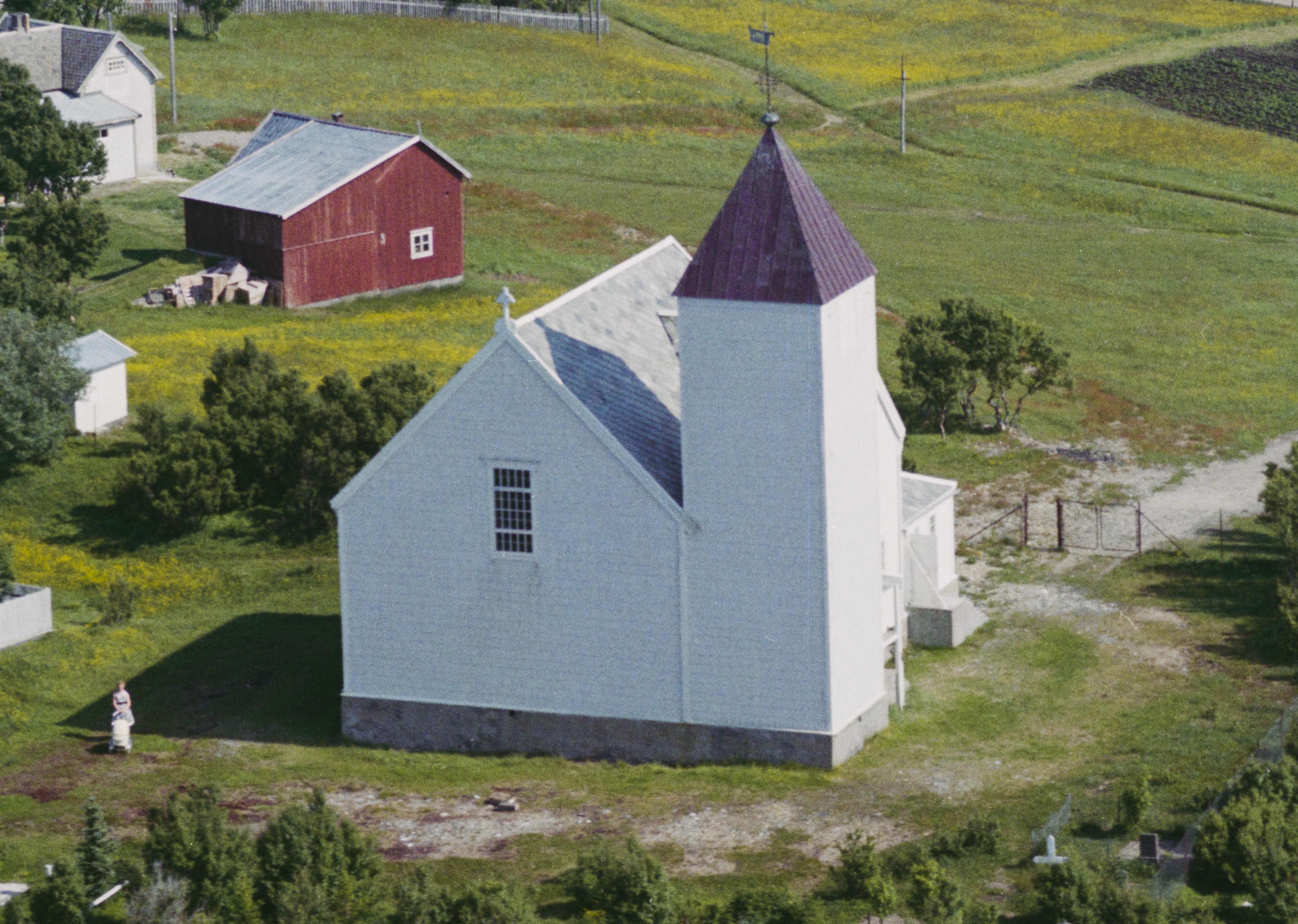
- View of the church
- Andørja Church
- 68.9241746°N 17.1181717°E
- Location: Ibestad Municipality, Troms
- Country: Norway
- Denomination: Church of Norway
- Churchmanship: Evangelical Lutheran

History
- Status: Parish church
- Founded: 1914
- Consecrated: 11 Oct 1914

Architecture
- Functional status: Active
- Architect: S. Kristensen
- Architectural type: Long church
- Completed: 1914 (112 years ago)

Specifications
- Capacity: 325
- Materials: Wood

Administration
- Diocese: Nord-Hålogaland
- Deanery: Trondenes prosti
- Parish: Andørja
- Norwegian Cultural Heritage Site
- Type: Church
- Status: Listed
- ID: 83783

Andørja Church (Norwegian: Andørja kirke) is a parish church of the Church of Norway in Ibestad Municipality in Troms county, Norway. It is located in the village of Engenes on the northwestern tip of the island of Andørja. It is the church for the Andørja parish which is part of the Trondenes prosti (deanery) in the Diocese of Nord-Hålogaland. The white, wooden church was built in a long church style in 1914 using plans drawn up by the architect S. Kristensen. The church seats about 325 people. The church was consecrated on 11 October 1914 by the Bishop Gustav Dietrichson.

== See also ==
- List of churches in Nord-Hålogaland
