= Engenes =

Village in Ibestad Municipality, Norway

- Village
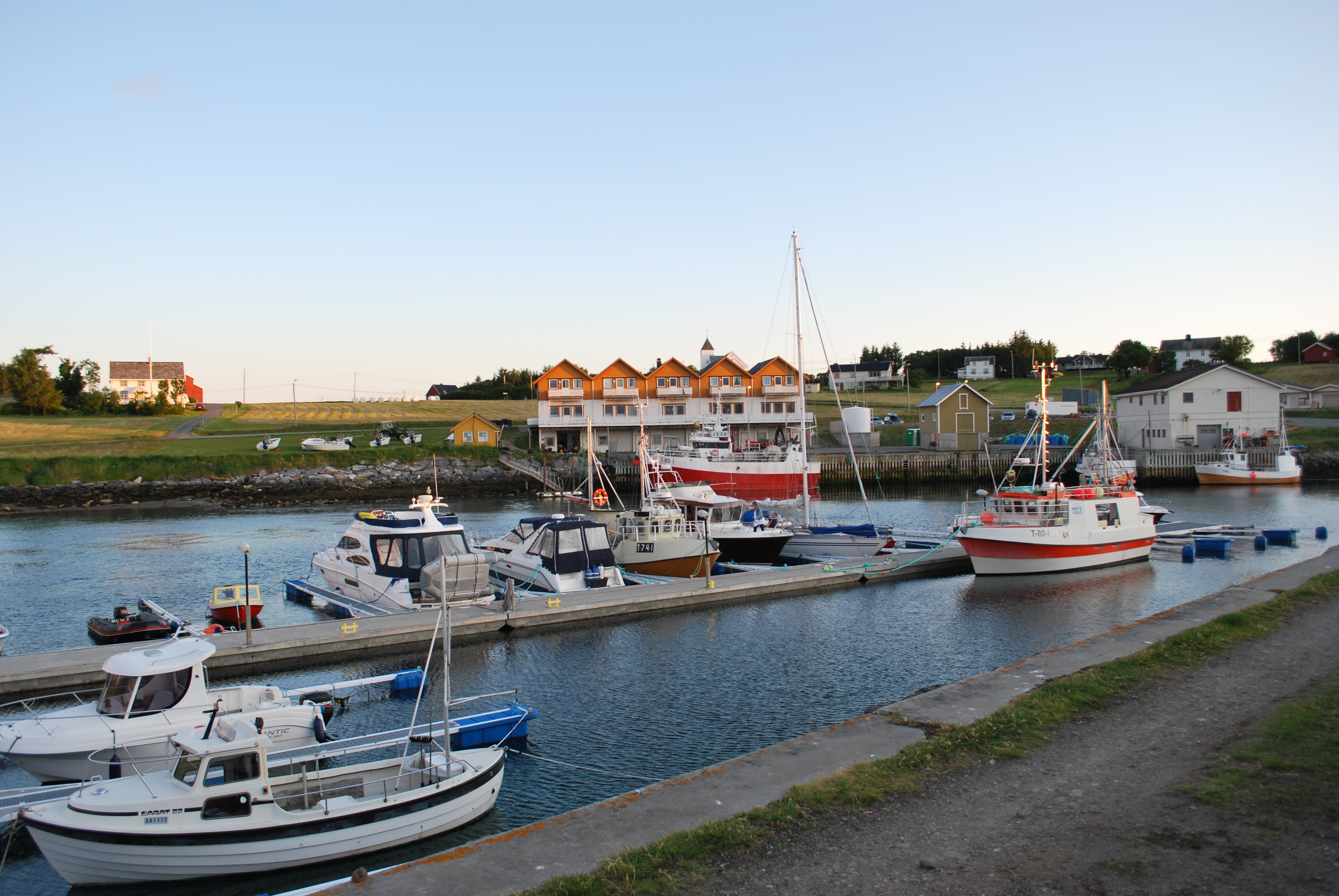
- View of the village harbor
- Interactive map of Engenes
- Location within Troms Location within Norway
- Coordinates: 68°55′32″N 17°07′22″E
- Country: Norway
- Region: Northern Norway
- County: Troms
- District: Central Hålogaland
- Municipality: Ibestad Municipality
- Elevation: 4 m (13 ft)
- Time zone: UTC+01:00 (CET)
  - Summer (DST): UTC+02:00 (CEST)
- Post Code: 9455 Engenes

Engenes is a small fishing village in Ibestad Municipality in Troms county, Norway. It is located on the northwestern tip of the island of Andørja. The village is home to Andørja Church, the main church for the island.
