= Ibestad Municipality =

Municipality in Troms, Norway

Ibestad Municipality Ibestad kommune Ivvárstáđiid suohkan (Northern Sami)
- Municipality
- Ibbestad herred (historic name)
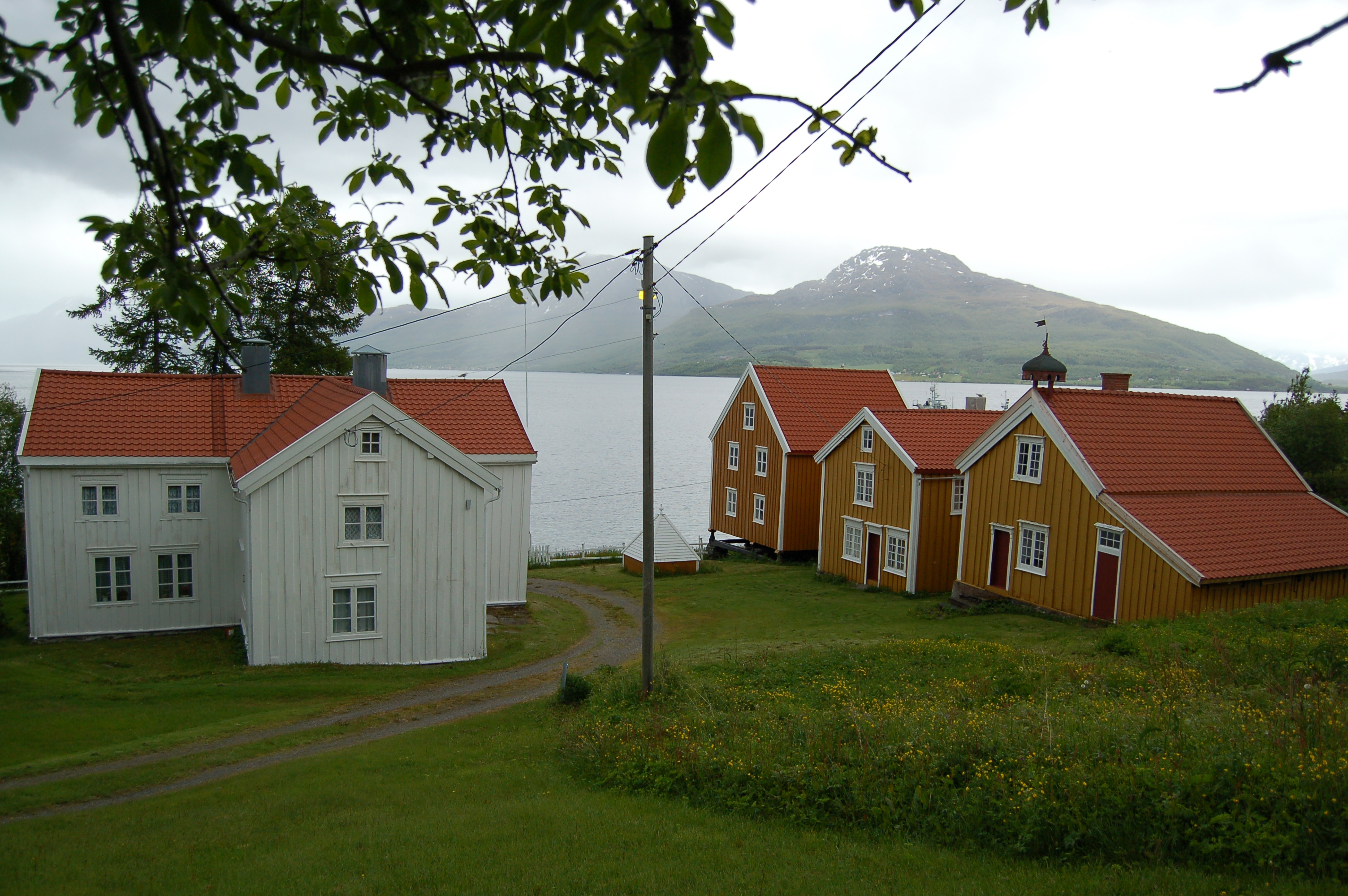

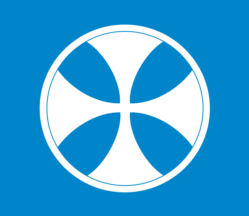
- Flag Coat of arms

- Troms within Norway

- Ibestad within Troms
- Coordinates: 68°49′46″N 17°14′45″E
- Country: Norway
- County: Troms
- District: Hålogaland
- Established: 1 Jan 1838
  - Created as: Formannskapsdistrikt
- Administrative centre: Hamnvik

Government
  - Mayor (2023): Jim Kristiansen (H)

Area
  - Total: 241.15 km^{2} (93.11 sq mi)
  - Land: 234.05 km^{2} (90.37 sq mi)
  - Water: 7.10 km^{2} (2.74 sq mi) 2.9%
  - Rank: #293 in Norway
- Highest elevation: 1,275.65 m (4,185.2 ft)

Population (2024)
  - Total: 1,311
  - Rank: #313 in Norway
  - Density: 5.4/km^{2} (14/sq mi)
  - Change (10 years): ▼ −8.7%
- Demonym: Ibestadværing

Official language
  - Norwegian form: Bokmål
- Time zone: UTC+01:00 (CET)
  - Summer (DST): UTC+02:00 (CEST)
- ISO 3166 code: NO-5514
- Website: Official website

Ibestad (Northern Sami: Ivvárstádik) is a municipality in Troms county, Norway. It is part of the traditional region of Central Hålogaland. The administrative centre of the municipality is the village of Hamnvik. Some of the other larger villages in Ibestad include Engenes, Laupstad, Rollnes, Sørrollnes, Sørvika, and Å.

The 241-square-kilometre (93 sq mi) municipality is the 293rd largest by area out of the 357 municipalities in Norway. Ibestad Municipality is the 313th most populous municipality in Norway with a population of 1,311. The municipality's population density is 5.4 inhabitants per square kilometre (14/sq mi) and its population has decreased by 8.7% over the previous 10-year period.

== General information ==
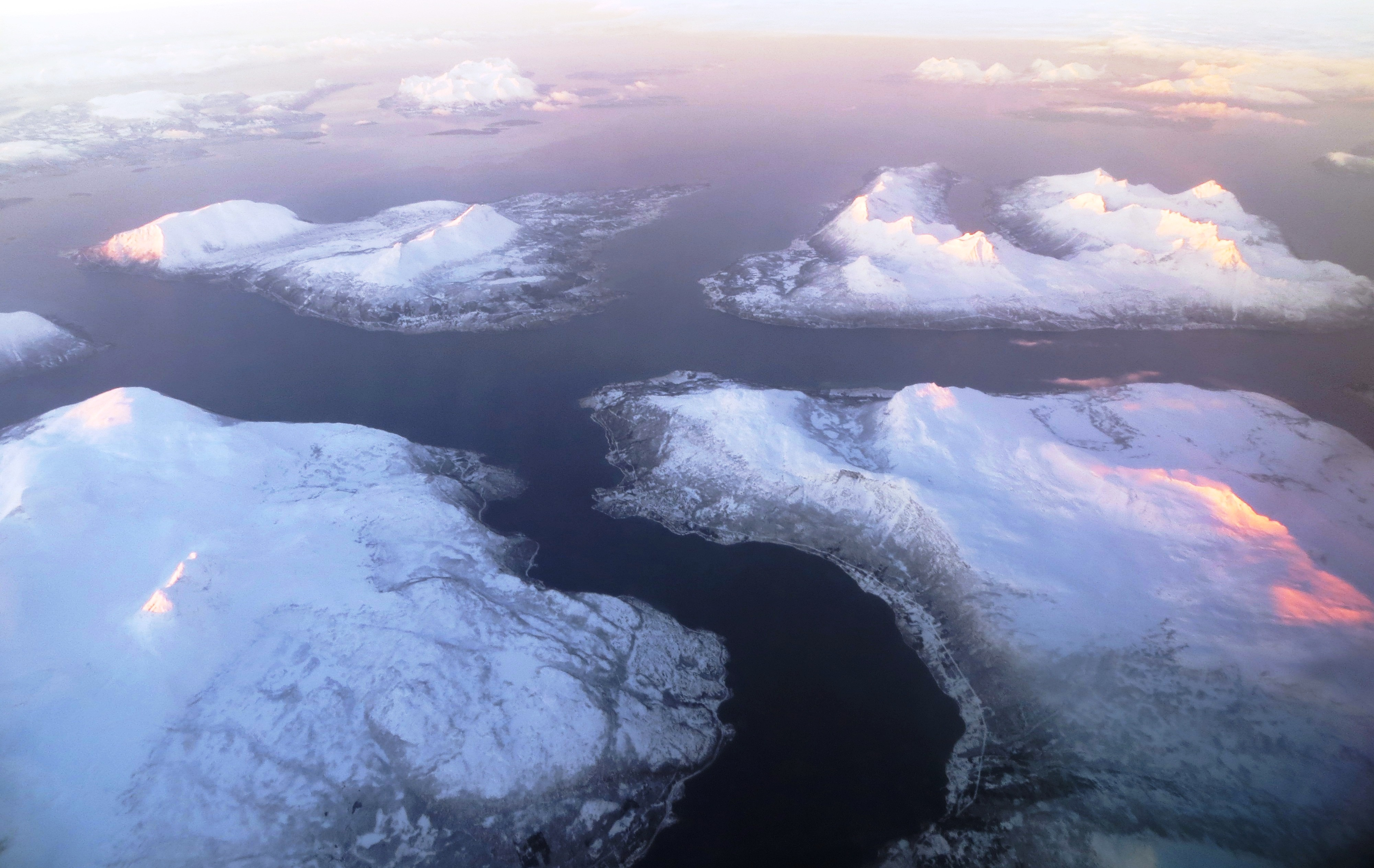
Ibestad includes the two islands in the central part of this picture

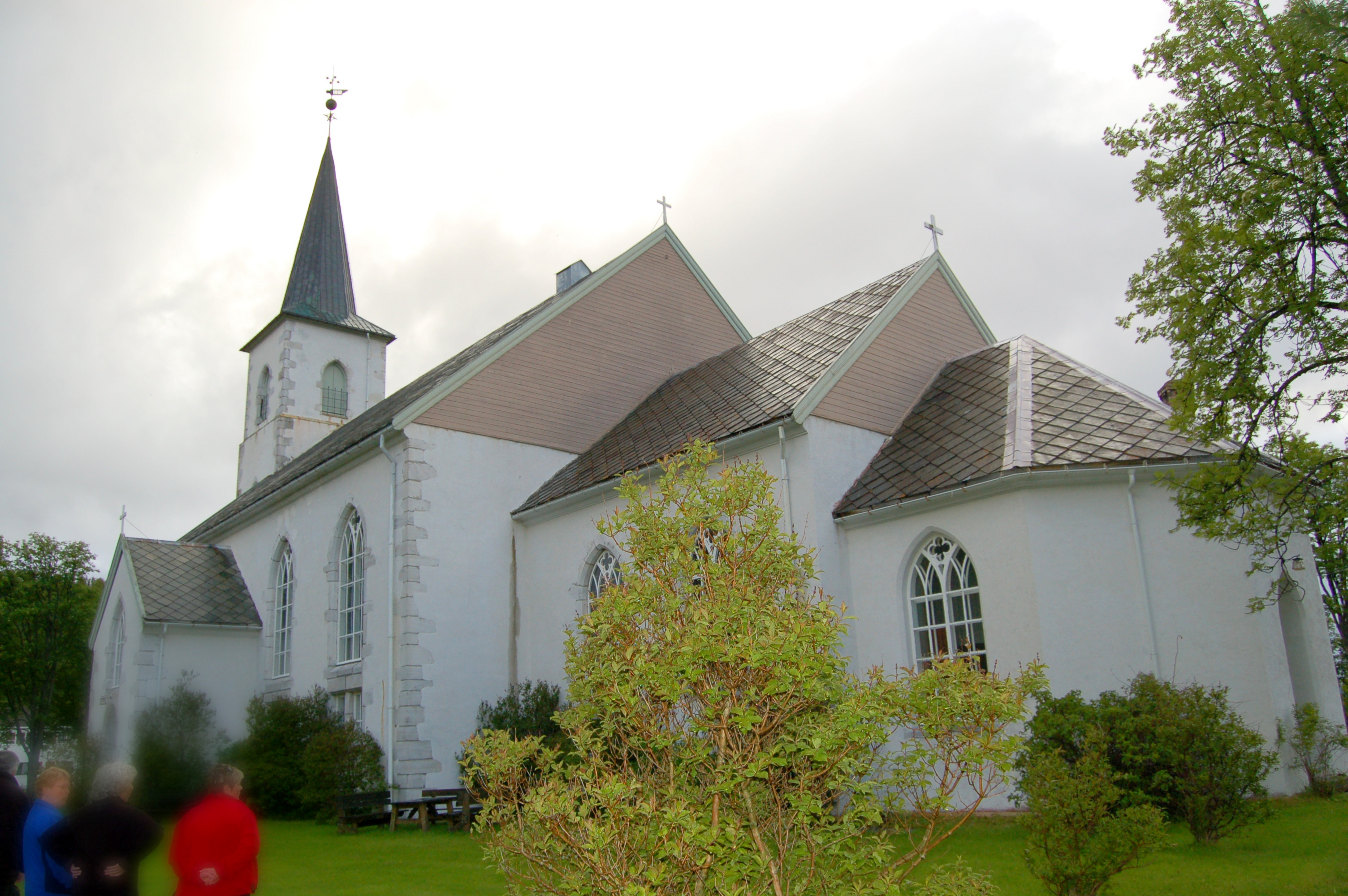
Ibestad Church

The municipality of Ibestad was established on 1 January 1838 (see formannskapsdistrikt law). Initially, Ibestad Municipality covered a large area from the Vågsfjorden strait to the border with Sweden (the old Astafjord Church parish). In 1854, the rural eastern half of the municipality (population: 757) was separated from Ibestad Municipality to form the new Bardu Municipality. This left Ibestad with 4,741 residents.

Then, on 1 January 1871, the northeastern part of the municipality (population: 1,384) was separated from Ibestad to form the new Salangen Municipality. This left Ibestad with 4,301 inhabitants. On 1 January 1907, the easternmost area of Ibestad (population: 1,536) became the separate Lavangen Municipality. Ibestad had 5,709 residents remaining after the split. In 1926, Ibestad Municipality was divided into four separate municipalities: Andørja Municipality (population: 1,420) in the northeast, Gratangen Municipality (population: 1,967) in the southeast, Astafjord Municipality (population: 1,018) in the southwest, and (a much smaller) Ibestad Municipality (population: 1,768) in the northwest.

During the 1960s, there were many municipal mergers across Norway due to the work of the Schei Committee. On 1 January 1964, Ibestad Municipality (population: 1,821) was merged with Andørja Municipality (population: 1,330) and the part of Skånland Municipality located on the island of Rolla (population: 143), creating a new Ibestad Municipality with a total of 3,294 residents.

On 1 January 2020, the municipality became part of the newly formed Troms og Finnmark county. Previously, it had been part of the old Troms county. On 1 January 2024, the Troms og Finnmark county was divided and the municipality once again became part of Troms county.

=== Name ===
The municipality (originally the parish) is named after the old Ibestad farm (Old Norse: Ívarsstaðir) since the first Ibestad Church was built there. The first element is the genitive case of the male name Ívarr. The last element is staðir which means "homestead" or "farm". Historically, the name of the municipality was spelled Ibbestad. On 3 November 1917, a royal resolution changed the spelling of the name of the municipality to Ibestad.

=== Coat of arms ===
The coat of arms was granted on 19 December 1986. The official blazon is "Azure, a cross formy within and conjoined to an annulet argent" (Norwegian: I blått et sølv hjulkors med utbøyde armer). This means the arms have a blue field (background) and the charge is a cross formy inside an annulet (circle). The charge has a tincture of argent which means it is commonly colored white, but if it is made out of metal, then silver is used. The design is reminiscent of the Ibestad Church, built around the year 1200. It is one of the northernmost stone churches in the world. In the 1960s a 13th-century gravestone was found at the church which had the same type of "wheel cross" design. This design was eventually chosen for the Ibestad coat of arms. These types of crosses were often used as ornaments in wooden stave churches. The arms were designed by Steinar Hanssen.

=== Churches ===
The Church of Norway has two parishes (sokn) within Ibestad Municipality. It is part of the Trondenes prosti (deanery) in the Diocese of Nord-Hålogaland.

Churches in Ibestad Municipality
Parish (sokn)	Church name	Location of the church	Year built
Andørja	Andørja Church	Engenes	1914
Ibestad	Ibestad Church	Hamnvik	1881
Ibestad	Sørrollnes Chapel	Sørrollnes	1976

== Geography ==
The municipality encompasses the islands of Andørja and Rolla and the tiny surrounding islets. The two main islands are connected by the undersea Ibestad Tunnel. The Mjøsund Bridge connects Andørja to Salangen Municipality on the mainland. There is a regular ferry connection from Sørrollnes on Rolla to the town of Harstad.

The Astafjorden forms the southeastern border of the municipality and the Vågsfjorden forms the western and northern borders. The small Mjøsundet strait forms the eastern border. The highest point in Ibestad Municipality is the 1,275.65-metre (4,185.2 ft) tall mountain Langlitinden.

=== Climate ===
Climate data for Hamnvik
Month	Jan	Feb	Mar	Apr	May	Jun	Jul	Aug	Sep	Oct	Nov	Dec	Year
Daily mean °C (°F)	−3.4 (25.9)	−3.1 (26.4)	−1.5 (29.3)	1.6 (34.9)	6.2 (43.2)	10.0 (50.0)	12.4 (54.3)	11.9 (53.4)	8.0 (46.4)	3.9 (39.0)	−0.1 (31.8)	−2.4 (27.7)	3.6 (38.5)
Average precipitation mm (inches)	89 (3.5)	82 (3.2)	66 (2.6)	56 (2.2)	42 (1.7)	49 (1.9)	63 (2.5)	74 (2.9)	99 (3.9)	128 (5.0)	97 (3.8)	105 (4.1)	950 (37.4)
Source: Norwegian Meteorological Institute

== Government ==
Ibestad Municipality is responsible for primary education (through 10th grade), outpatient health services, senior citizen services, welfare and other social services, zoning, economic development, and municipal roads and utilities. The municipality is governed by a municipal council of directly elected representatives. The mayor is indirectly elected by a vote of the municipal council. The municipality is under the jurisdiction of the Midtre Hålogaland District Court and the Hålogaland Court of Appeal.

=== Municipal council ===
The municipal council (Kommunestyre) of Ibestad Municipality is made up of 19 representatives that are elected to four year terms. The tables below show the current and historical composition of the council by political party.

Ibestad kommunestyre 2023–2027
Party name (in Norwegian)	Number of representatives
Labour Party (Arbeiderpartiet)	7
Conservative Party (Høyre)	9
Centre Party (Senterpartiet)	1
Total number of members:	19

Ibestad kommunestyre 2019–2023
Party name (in Norwegian)	Number of representatives
Labour Party (Arbeiderpartiet)	6
Conservative Party (Høyre)	9
Centre Party (Senterpartiet)	4
Total number of members:	19

Ibestad kommunestyre 2015–2019
Party name (in Norwegian)	Number of representatives
Labour Party (Arbeiderpartiet)	4
Conservative Party (Høyre)	6
Centre Party (Senterpartiet)	3
Liberal Party (Venstre)	1
Andørja Common List (Andørja Fellesliste)	5
Total number of members:	19

Ibestad kommunestyre 2011–2015
Party name (in Norwegian)	Number of representatives
Labour Party (Arbeiderpartiet)	3
Conservative Party (Høyre)	4
Centre Party (Senterpartiet)	4
Liberal Party (Venstre)	1
Andørja Common List (Andørja fellesliste)	7
Total number of members:	19

Ibestad kommunestyre 2007–2011
Party name (in Norwegian)	Number of representatives
Conservative Party (Høyre)	2
Joint list of the Labour Party (Arbeiderpartiet), Centre Party (Senterpartiet), and Liberal Party (Venstre)	8
Andørja common list (Andørja fellesliste)	7
Ibestad local list (Ibestad bygdeliste)	2
Total number of members:	19

Ibestad kommunestyre 2003–2007
Party name (in Norwegian)	Number of representatives
Conservative Party (Høyre)	2
Joint list of the Labour Party (Arbeiderpartiet), Centre Party (Senterpartiet), and Liberal Party (Venstre)	11
Andørja common list (Andørja fellesliste)	8
Total number of members:	21

Ibestad kommunestyre 1999–2003
Party name (in Norwegian)	Number of representatives
Labour Party (Arbeiderpartiet)	5
Conservative Party (Høyre)	4
Christian Democratic Party (Kristelig Folkeparti)	1
Centre Party (Senterpartiet)	2
Liberal Party (Venstre)	2
Andørja common list (Andørja fellesliste)	7
Total number of members:	21

Ibestad kommunestyre 1995–1999
Party name (in Norwegian)	Number of representatives
Labour Party (Arbeiderpartiet)	4
Conservative Party (Høyre)	5
Christian Democratic Party (Kristelig Folkeparti)	1
Centre Party (Senterpartiet)	2
Socialist Left Party (Sosialistisk Venstreparti)	1
Liberal Party (Venstre)	1
Rolla Youth List (Rolla Ungdomsliste)	2
Andørja Common List (Andørja Fellesliste)	5
Total number of members:	21

Ibestad kommunestyre 1991–1995
Party name (in Norwegian)	Number of representatives
Labour Party (Arbeiderpartiet)	6
Conservative Party (Høyre)	5
Christian Democratic Party (Kristelig Folkeparti)	1
Socialist Left Party (Sosialistisk Venstreparti)	2
Outer Andørja Common List (Ytre Andørja Fellesliste)	2
Common list for Inner Andørja (Fellesliste for Indre Andørja)	1
Rolla common list (Rolla fellesliste)	3
Kråkre and Furnes election list (Kråkre og Furnes valgliste)	1
Total number of members:	21

Ibestad kommunestyre 1987–1991
Party name (in Norwegian)	Number of representatives
Labour Party (Arbeiderpartiet)	6
Conservative Party (Høyre)	4
Socialist Left Party (Sosialistisk Venstreparti)	1
Liberal Party (Venstre)	2
Outer Andørja Common List (Ytre Andørja Fellesliste)	3
Common list for Inner Andørja (Fellesliste for Indre Andørja)	3
Rolla common list (Rolla fellesliste)	1
Kråkre and Furnes election list (Kråkre og Furnes valgliste)	1
Total number of members:	21

Ibestad kommunestyre 1983–1987
Party name (in Norwegian)	Number of representatives
Labour Party (Arbeiderpartiet)	6
Conservative Party (Høyre)	4
Christian Democratic Party (Kristelig Folkeparti)	1
Centre Party (Senterpartiet)	1
Liberal Party (Venstre)	2
Outer Andørja Common List (Ytre Andørja Fellesliste)	4
Common list for Inner Andørja (Fellesliste for Indre Andørja)	5
Rolla common list (Rolla fellesliste)	2
Total number of members:	25

Ibestad kommunestyre 1979–1983
Party name (in Norwegian)	Number of representatives
Labour Party (Arbeiderpartiet)	6
Conservative Party (Høyre)	3
Christian Democratic Party (Kristelig Folkeparti)	1
Centre Party (Senterpartiet)	3
Liberal Party (Venstre)	3
Outer Andørja Common List (Ytre Andørja Fellesliste)	4
Common list for Inner Andørja (Fellesliste for Indre Andørja)	5
Total number of members:	25

Ibestad kommunestyre 1975–1979
Party name (in Norwegian)	Number of representatives
Labour Party (Arbeiderpartiet)	7
Conservative Party (Høyre)	2
Christian Democratic Party (Kristelig Folkeparti)	2
Centre Party (Senterpartiet)	3
Liberal Party (Venstre)	3
Outer Andørja Common List (Ytre Andørja Fellesliste)	4
Common list for Inner Andørja (Fellesliste for Indre Andørja)	4
Total number of members:	25

Ibestad kommunestyre 1971–1975
Party name (in Norwegian)	Number of representatives
Labour Party (Arbeiderpartiet)	9
Local List(s) (Lokale lister)	20
Total number of members:	29

Ibestad kommunestyre 1967–1971
Party name (in Norwegian)	Number of representatives
Labour Party (Arbeiderpartiet)	8
Conservative Party (Høyre)	3
Local List(s) (Lokale lister)	18
Total number of members:	29

Ibestad kommunestyre 1963–1967
Party name (in Norwegian)	Number of representatives
Conservative Party (Høyre)	4
Local List(s) (Lokale lister)	25
Total number of members:	29
Note: On 1 January 1964, Ibestad Municipality was merged with Andørja Municipality and part of Skånland Municipality.

Ibestad herredsstyre 1959–1963
Party name (in Norwegian)	Number of representatives
List of workers, fishermen, and small farmholders (Arbeidere, fiskere, småbrukere liste)	3
Local List(s) (Lokale lister)	16
Total number of members:	19

Ibestad herredsstyre 1955–1959
Party name (in Norwegian)	Number of representatives
Liberal Party (Venstre)	1
Local List(s) (Lokale lister)	18
Total number of members:	19

Ibestad herredsstyre 1951–1955
Party name (in Norwegian)	Number of representatives
Labour Party (Arbeiderpartiet)	6
Liberal Party (Venstre)	1
Local List(s) (Lokale lister)	9
Total number of members:	16

Ibestad herredsstyre 1947–1951
Party name (in Norwegian)	Number of representatives
Labour Party (Arbeiderpartiet)	11
Joint List(s) of Non-Socialist Parties (Borgerlige Felleslister)	4
Local List(s) (Lokale lister)	1
Total number of members:	16

Ibestad herredsstyre 1945–1947
Party name (in Norwegian)	Number of representatives
List of workers, fishermen, and small farmholders (Arbeidere, fiskere, småbrukere liste)	7
Local List(s) (Lokale lister)	9
Total number of members:	16

Ibestad herredsstyre 1937–1941*
Party name (in Norwegian)	Number of representatives
Labour Party (Arbeiderpartiet)	8
Local List(s) (Lokale lister)	8
Total number of members:	16
Note: Due to the German occupation of Norway during World War II, no elections were held for new municipal councils until after the war ended in 1945.

=== Mayors ===
The mayor (Norwegian: ordfører) of Ibestad Municipality is the political leader of the municipality and the chairperson of the municipal council. Here is a list of people who have held this position:

- 1838–1845: Peter Munch Brager
- 1846–1847: Poul Irgens Holst
- 1848–1849: Nikolai Normann Dons
- 1850–1855: Jørris Schjelderup Hanssen
- 1856–1857: Jens Bing Dons Jr.
- 1858–1862: Fredrik Hegge
- 1863–1868: Jens Bing Dons Jr.
- 1869–1872: Peder B. Dons
- 1873–1876: Johan Barak Dønnesen
- 1877–1880: Peder B. Dons
- 1881–1882: Konrad Saugestad
- 1883–1884: Andreas Simon Olsen
- 1885–1888: Konrad Saugestad
- 1889–1890: Peder B. Dons
- 1891–1898: Konrad Saugestad
- 1899–1907: Johan Laurits Johansen
- 1908–1910: Helge Hallesen (V)
- 1911–1913: Martin Rasmussen (V)
- 1914–1919: John Lind-Johansen (Ap)
- 1923–1940: Håkon Breivoll (Ap)
- 1941–1945: Fridtjof Kjæreng (NS)
- 1945–1945: Håkon Breivoll (Ap)
- 1946–1953: Hans Simonsen (Ap)
- 1954–1957: Einar Horsberg (V)
- 1957–1959: Hans Simonsen (Ap)
- 1960–1961: Einar Horsberg (V)
- 1962–1963: Ove Bergvoll (Ap)
- 1964–1967: Olav Eriksen (Ap)
- 1968–1975: Peder H. Pedersen (Sp)
- 1976–1979: Odd Jacobsen (Ap)
- 1980–1983: Peder H. Pedersen (Sp)
- 1984–2007: Arne Olav Ekman (H)
- 2007–2011: Marit Johansen (Ap)
- 2011–2023: Dag Brustind (H)
- 2023–present: Jim Kristiansen (H)

== Notable people ==
- Håkon Martin Breivoll (1886 in Ibestad – 1955), a Norwegian politician who was Mayor of Ibestad municipality from 1922 to 1940
