= Ibestad Tunnel =

Undersea tunnel in Ibestad, Norway

Ibestad Tunnel Ibestadtunnelen
- Interactive map of Ibestad Tunnel; Ibestadtunnelen

Overview
- Location: Ibestad, Troms, Norway
- Coordinates: 68.7927°N 17.2013°E
- Status: In use
- Route: Fv848

Operation
- Opened: 2 December 2000

Technical
- Length: 3,398 metres (11,148 ft)
- Min elevation: −112 metres (−367 ft)
- Width: 6 metres (20 ft)
- Grade: 9.9%

The Ibestad Tunnel is an undersea tunnel in Ibestad Municipality in Troms county, Norway. The tunnel connects the islands of Rolla and Andørja. The western end of the tunnel begins in the village of Hamnvik on Rolla. Then the tunnel goes under the Bygda strait and connects to the village of Sørvika on the island of Andørja. The 3,398-metre (2.1 mi) long tunnel reaches a maximum depth of 112 metres (367 ft) below sea level. The width of the tunnel is 6 metres (20 ft) wide, and the steepest grade within the tunnel is 9.9%.

The tunnel, together with the Mjøsund Bridge, are part of Norwegian County Road 848 which is a ferry-free road connection between the islands of Rolla and Andørja to the mainland of Norway.
