= Vågsfjorden, Troms =

Fjord in Troms county, Norway

Vågsfjorden (Norwegian); Váhkvierddas (Northern Sami)
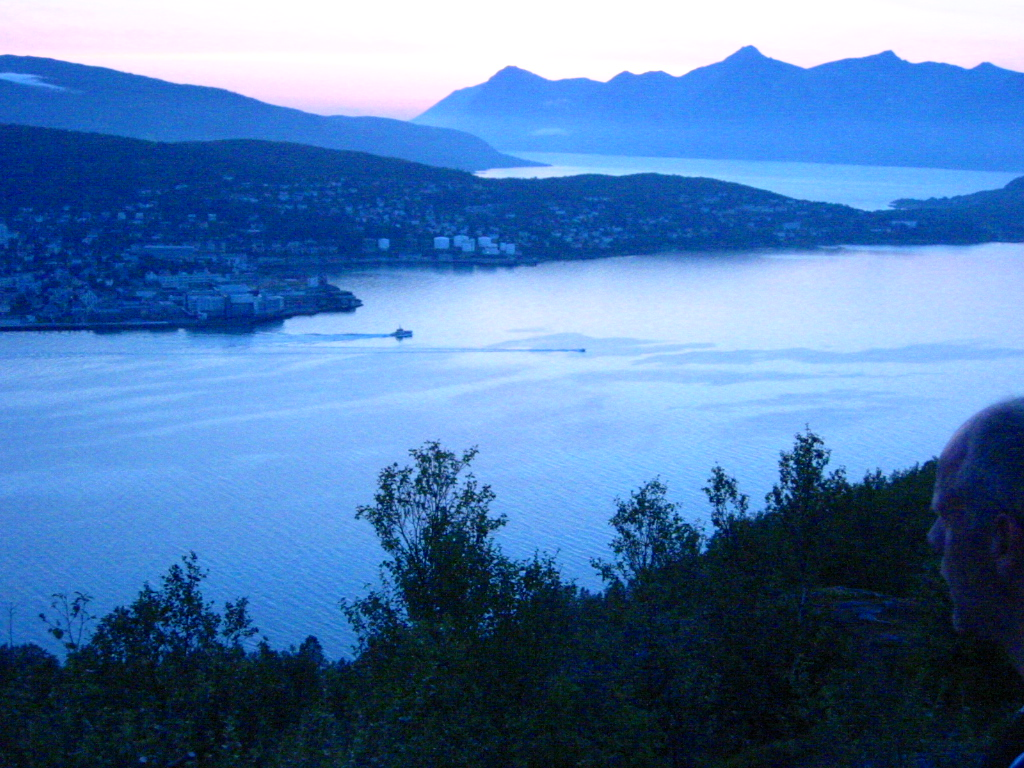
- View of the fjord and the northern part of the town of Harstad
- Interactive map of the fjord
- Location: Troms county, Norway
- Coordinates: 68.8662°N 16.9030°E
- Type: Fjord
- Basin countries: Norway
- Max. length: 46 kilometres (29 mi)
- Max. width: 20 kilometres (12 mi)
- Settlements: Harstad

Vågsfjorden (Norwegian) or Váhkvierddas (Northern Sami) is a fjord in the southern part of Troms county in Norway. The fjord is located between Norway's two largest islands, Hinnøya to the south and Senja to the north. The fjord connects to the Andfjorden and the Tranøyfjorden to the north, and to the Astafjorden and Tjeldsundet to the south. The smaller islands of Grytøya and Sandsøya lie on the western side of the fjord and the islands of Andørja and Rolla lie along the eastern side of the fjord.

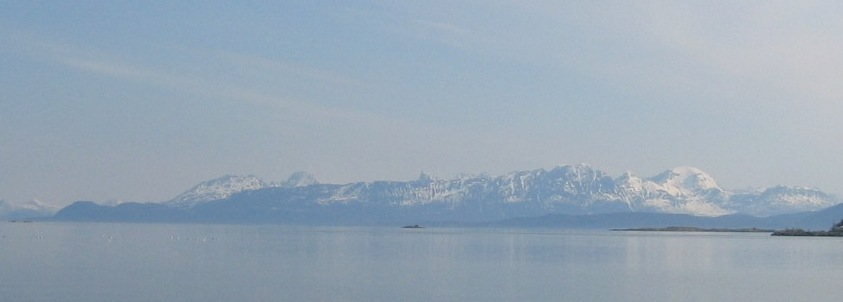
Vågsfjorden and Andørja. View towards north-east from the town of Harstad

The 46-kilometre (29 mi) long fjord flows through the municipalities of Harstad, Senja, Dyrøy, Ibestad, and Tjeldsund. The town of Harstad, on the fjord's western shore, is popularly known as Vågsfjordens perle (English: pearl of Vågsfjorden).
