= Astafjord Church =

- Astafjord kirke
- Astafjord Church
- 68.6747963°N 17.1242174°E
- Location: Tjeldsund Municipality, Troms
- Country: Norway
- Denomination: Church of Norway
- Churchmanship: Evangelical Lutheran

History
- Status: Parish church
- Founded: 1978
- Consecrated: 1978

Architecture
- Functional status: Active
- Architect: Harald Hille
- Architectural type: Fan-shaped
- Completed: 1978 (48 years ago)

Specifications
- Capacity: 300
- Materials: Concrete

Administration
- Diocese: Nord-Hålogaland
- Deanery: Trondenes prosti
- Parish: Astafjord
- Norwegian Cultural Heritage Site
- Type: Church
- Status: Not protected
- ID: 83805

Astafjord Church (Norwegian: Astafjord kirke) is a parish church of the Church of Norway in Tjeldsund Municipality in Troms county, Norway. It is located in the village of Grov. It is the church for the Astafjord parish which is part of the Trondenes prosti (deanery) in the Diocese of Nord-Hålogaland. The white, concrete church was built in a fan-shaped design in 1978 using plans drawn up by the architect Harald Hille. The church seats about 300 people.

== See also ==
- List of churches in Nord-Hålogaland
