= Hamnvik =

Village in Ibestad Municipality, Norway

Hamnvik: Hamnvik (Norwegian); Ibestad (Norwegian); Ivvárstádik (Northern Sami)
- Village
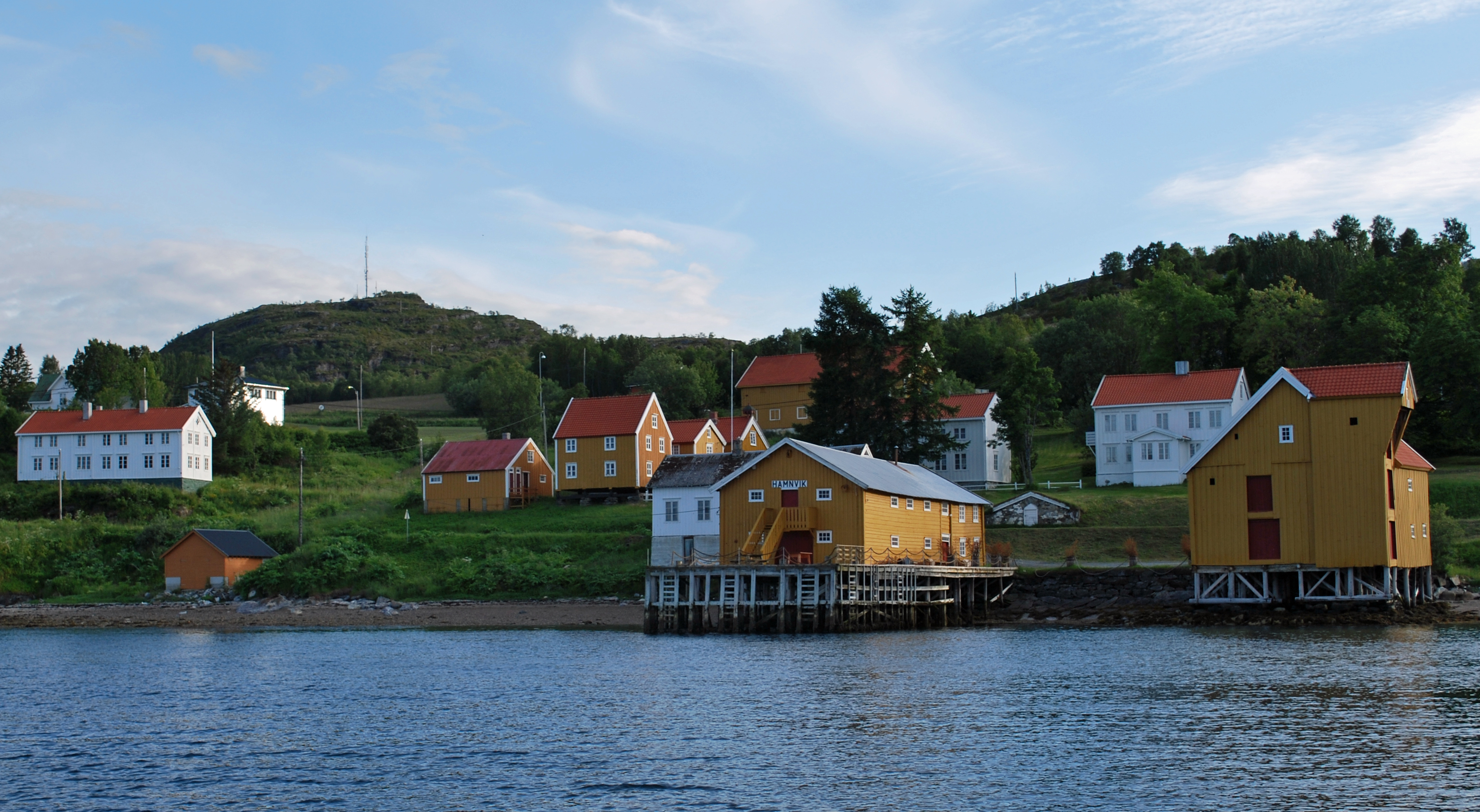
- View of the village
- Interactive map of Hamnvik
- Location within Troms Location within Norway
- Coordinates: 68°46′41″N 17°10′28″E
- Country: Norway
- Region: Northern Norway
- County: Troms
- District: Central Hålogaland
- Municipality: Ibestad Municipality

Area
  - Total: 0.69 km^{2} (0.27 sq mi)
- Elevation: 33 m (108 ft)

Population (2023)
  - Total: 446
  - Density: 646/km^{2} (1,670/sq mi)
- Time zone: UTC+01:00 (CET)
  - Summer (DST): UTC+02:00 (CEST)
- Post Code: 9450 Hamnvik

Hamnvik, also known as Ibestad (Norwegian) or Ivvárstádik (Northern Sami) is the administrative centre of Ibestad Municipality in Troms county, Norway. It is located on the eastern tip of the island of Rolla. The 0.69-square-kilometre (170-acre) village has a population (2023) of 446 and a population density of 646 inhabitants per square kilometre (1,670/sq mi).

The village is located at the western end of the Ibestad Tunnel, which is part of a ferry-free road connection to the mainland. Ibestad Church is also located in Hamnvik. The village is the commercial centre of the municipality with several stores, doctors, nursing homes, and schools.
