= Rolla (Troms) =

Island in Ibestad Municipality in Troms county, Norway

Rolla (Norwegian) Rálli (Northern Sami)
- Interactive map of Rolla (Norwegian); Rálli (Northern Sami)

Geography
- Location: Troms, Norway
- Coordinates: 68.8237°N 17.0035°E
- Area: 106.4 km^{2} (41.1 sq mi)
- Length: 17 km (10.6 mi)
- Width: 10.5 km (6.52 mi)
- Coastline: 47 km (29.2 mi)
- Highest elevation: 1,022 m (3353 ft)
- Highest point: Drangen

Administration
- Norway
- County: Troms
- Municipality: Ibestad Municipality
- Largest settlement: Hamnvik (pop. 470)

Demographics
- Population: 1078 (2001)
- Pop. density: 10.1/km^{2} (26.2/sq mi)

Rolla (Norwegian) or Rálli (Northern Sami) is an island in Ibestad Municipality in Troms county, Norway. The island of Andørja lies to the northeast, the Vågsfjorden lies to the north and west, and the Astafjorden lies to the south. The highest point on the 106-square-kilometre (41 sq mi) island of Rolla is Drangen at a height of 1,022 metres (3,353 ft). The population on Rolla (2001) is 1,078.

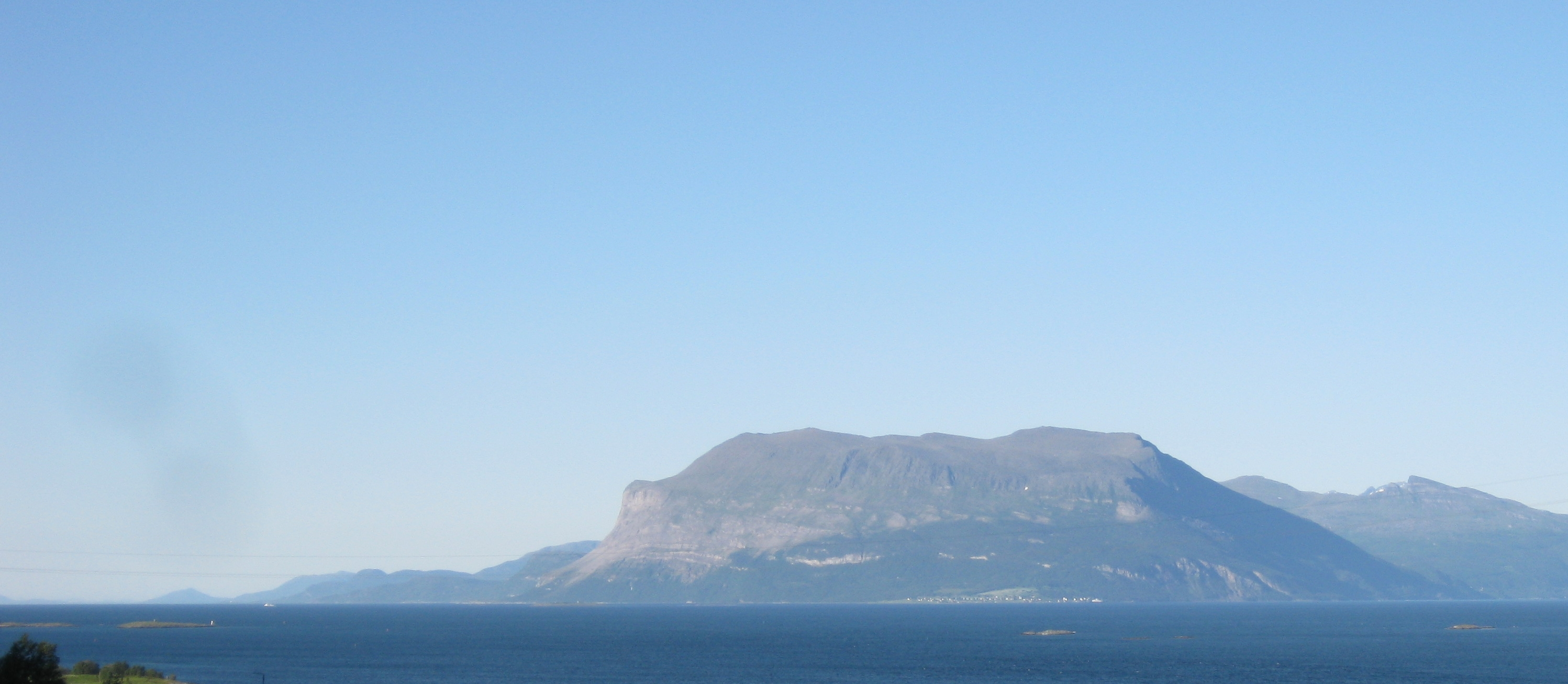
View of Rolla from the southwest

Rolla is connected to the neighboring island of Andørja by the undersea Ibestad Tunnel located in Hamnvik. Andørja is then connected to the mainland via the Mjøsund Bridge. There is a ferry connection from Sørrollnes on the western coast to the town of Harstad.

There are two main churches on the island: Ibestad Church in Hamnvik and Sørrollnes Chapel in Sørrollnes.

== See also ==
- List of islands of Norway
- List of islands of Norway by area
