= Astafjorden =

Fjord in Troms county, Norway

Astafjorden (Norwegian); Ástavierda (Northern Sami)
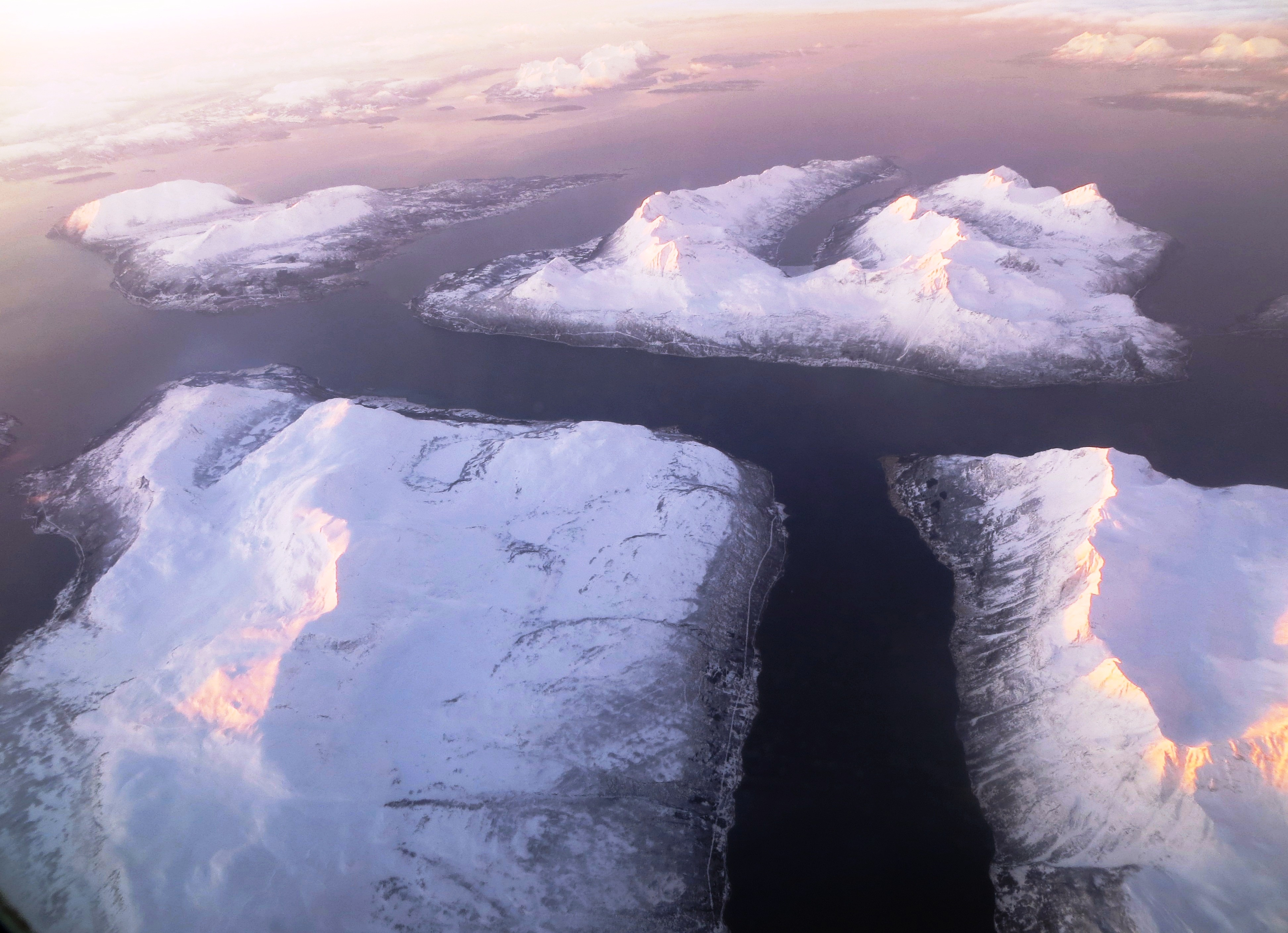
- The Astafjorden flows left to right in this picture.
- Interactive map of the fjord
- Location: Troms county, Norway
- Coordinates: 68.7875°N 17.2445°E
- Type: Fjord
- Primary inflows: Salangen; Lavangen; Gratangen
- Primary outflows: Vågsfjorden
- Basin countries: Norway
- Max. length: 30 kilometres (19 mi)
- Max. width: 3.5 kilometres (2.2 mi)

Astafjorden (Norwegian) or Ástavierda (Northern Sami) is a fjord (more accurately, a strait) in Troms county, Norway. It flows through the municipalities of Salangen, Gratangen, Ibestad, and Tjeldsund. The 30-kilometre (19 mi) long fjord flows from the Salangen fjord in the east to the Vågsfjorden in the west. The 3.5-kilometre (2.2 mi) wide fjord separates the islands of Andørja and Rolla from the mainland. There are several small fjords that branch off this fjord including: Lavangen, Gratangen, Grovfjorden, and Salangen.

== Name ==
The fjord (and the historic Astafjord Municipality) were named after the old Ånstad farm (Old Norse: Arnastaðafjǫrðr). The first element of the old name comes from the male name Arna or "Arne", the second element staða means "home" or "farm", and the last element fjǫrðr is identical with the word for "fjord". Thus, the name literally means the "fjord by Arne's farm".

Another possible explanation for the origin of the name of the Astafjord in Troms might be that it was named after Queen Asta, mother of King "Hellige" Olav in the 11th century who allegedly brought Christianity to Norway.

== See also ==
- List of Norwegian fjords
