= Ånderdalen National Park =

National park in Senja, Norway

- Ånderdalen nasjonalpark
- IUCN category II (national park)
- Interactive map of Ånderdalen National Park
- Location: Senja, Troms, Norway
- Nearest city: Finnsnes (closer), Harstad
- Coordinates: 69°12′N 17°16′E
- Area: 134 km^{2} (52 sq mi)
- Established: 1970, enlarged 2004
- Governing body: Norwegian Environment Agency

Ånderdalen National Park (Norwegian: Ånderdalen nasjonalpark) is located on the large island of Senja in Troms county, Norway. The 134-square-kilometre (52 sq mi) park lies within Senja Municipality. The park was established by royal decree on 6 February 1970 and it was enlarged in 2004. The national park preserves this Northern Norwegian coastal landscape. The bedrock consists of hard granite rocks and the landscape image gives exciting impressions of the glacial forces that have worked on Senja. The coastal pine forest in Ånderdalen has in some areas primeval forest with over 600 years old trees and countless marble pines and lower. Along the river there are many lush hawked birch forests and floodplain forests.

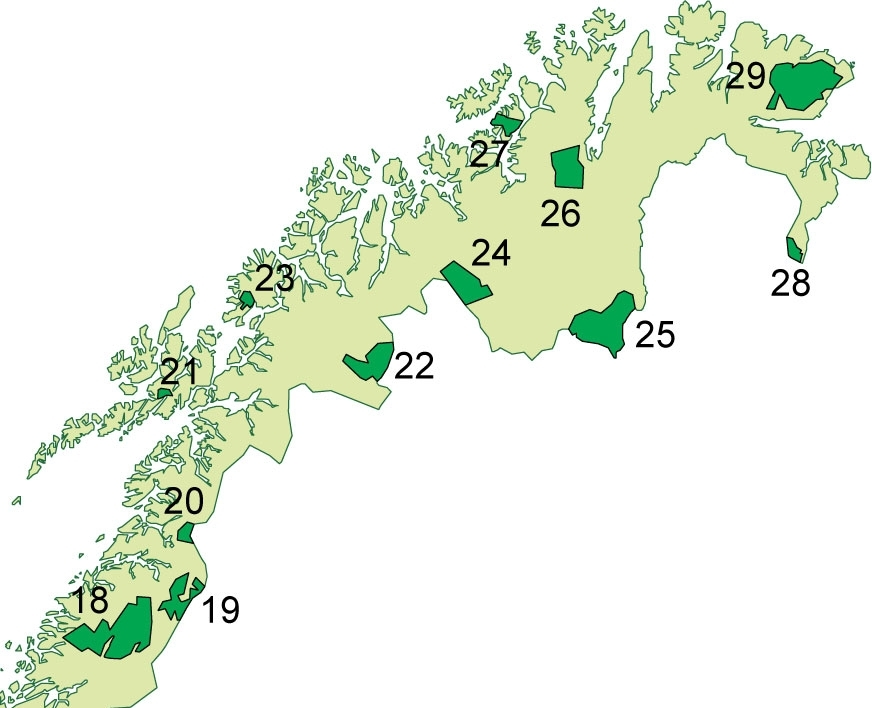
Number 23 is Ånderdalen

The national park had no moose before 1940, but it now has a permanent population. It is also an important calving and grazing area for semi-domesticated reindeer. The most common smaller animals are red foxes, stoats, hares, small rodents, and two species of shrews. Seals occur at the heads of the fjords and otters are often seen along rivers. Trout and char are common, and salmon run right up the river to the lake Åndervatn.

== Name ==
The last element is the finite form of dal which means "dale" or "valley". The meaning of the first element is unknown. In the valley and the park are similar names such as the river Ånderelva and the lake Åndervatnet.
