= Laukhella =

Village in Senja Municipality, Norway

Laukhella: Laukhella (Norwegian); Ytre Laukhella (Norwegian); Lávkheallu (Northern Sami)
- Village
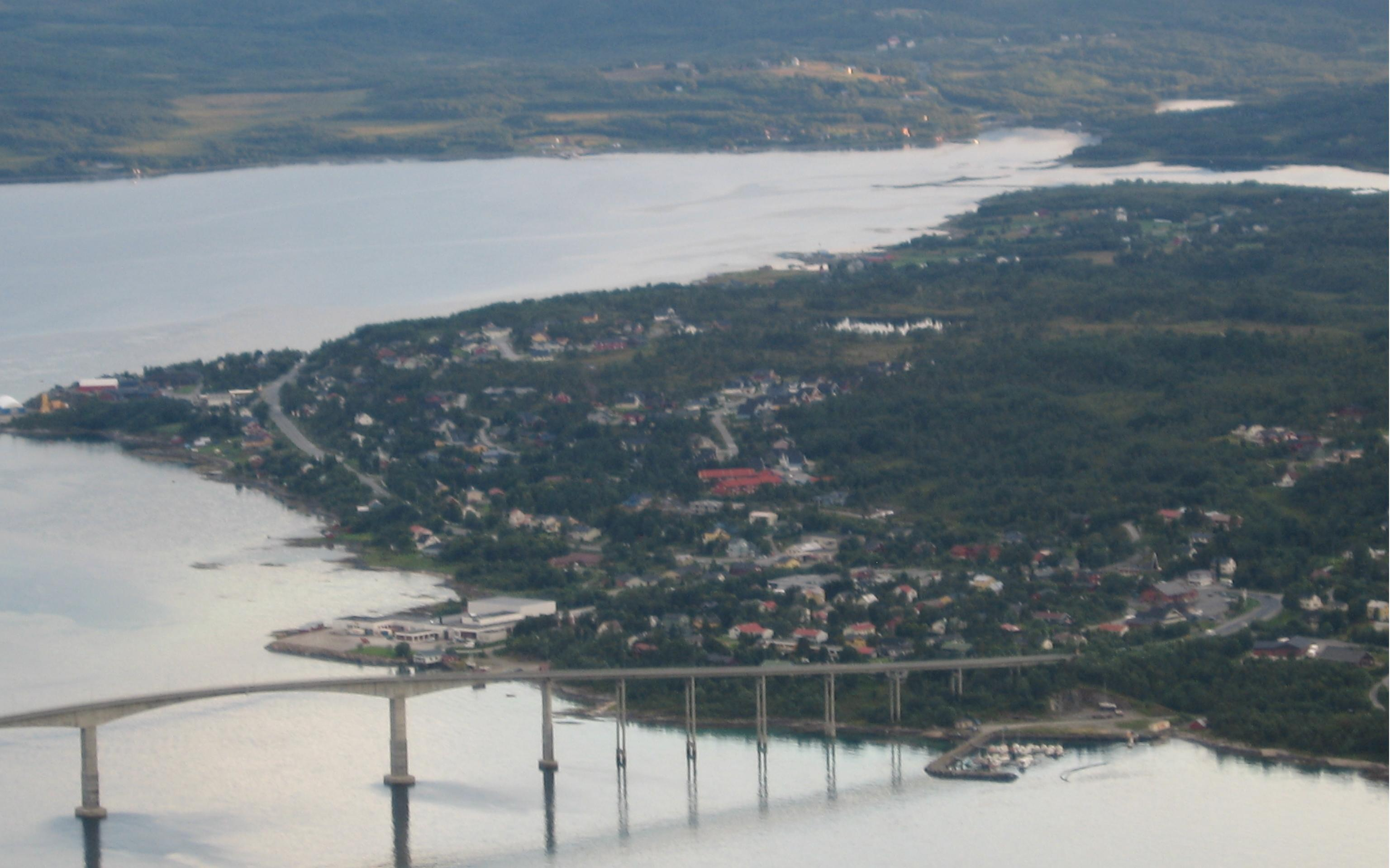
- View of Laukhella (in the upper right part of the picture)
- Interactive map of Laukhella
- Location within Troms Location within Norway
- Coordinates: 69.23593°N 17.89301°E
- Country: Norway
- Region: Northern Norway
- County: Troms
- District: Midt-Troms
- Municipality: Senja Municipality
- Elevation: 9 m (30 ft)
- Time zone: UTC+01:00 (CET)
  - Summer (DST): UTC+02:00 (CEST)
- Post Code: 9303 Silsand

Laukhella or Ytre Laukhella (Norwegian) or Lávkheallu (Northern Sami) is a village in Senja Municipality in Troms county, Norway. The village lies to the west of the village of Silsand on the island of Senja. It is located along the Laksfjorden, about 5 km (3.1 mi) west of the town of Finnsnes.

The village and surrounding area is home to several hundred people, and one major local industry is a prefabricated house factory. Islandsbotn stadium is also here, which is the home field of the FK Senja football team.
