= Finnsnes =

Town in Senja, Norway

- Town/City
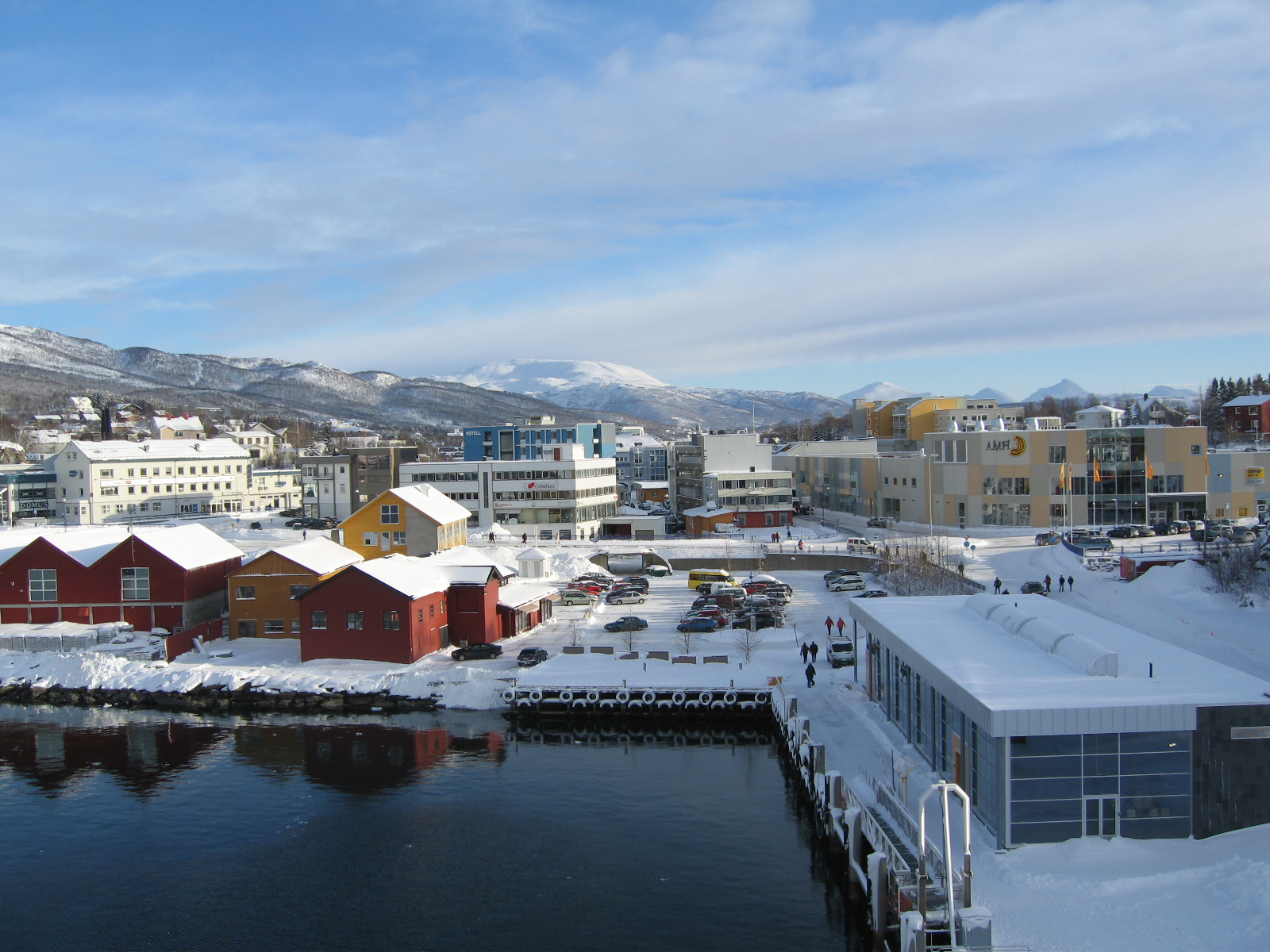
- View of the town in winter
- Interactive map of Finnsnes
- Location within Troms Location within Norway
- Coordinates: 69°13′46″N 17°58′52″E
- Country: Norway
- Region: Northern Norway
- County: Troms
- District: Midt-Troms
- Municipality: Senja Municipality
- Established as
- Town (By): 2000

Area
  - Total: 3.37 km^{2} (1.30 sq mi)
- Elevation: 8 m (26 ft)

Population (2023)
  - Total: 4,917
  - Density: 1,459/km^{2} (3,780/sq mi)
- Time zone: UTC+01:00 (CET)
  - Summer (DST): UTC+02:00 (CEST)
- Post Code: 9300 Finnsnes

Finnsnes (Norwegian pronunciation: [ˈfɪ̀nsnɛs], also [ˈfɪnsnɛs]) is a town that is the administrative centre of Senja Municipality in Troms county, Norway. The town is located on the mainland part of Norway, just across the Gisundet strait from the island of Senja. The Gisund Bridge connects Finnsnes to the suburban villages of Silsand and Laukhella on the island of Senja. The municipality is well-provided with kindergartens and a decentralized school system on both primary and secondary levels. There are also three schools on the upper secondary/high school level and a center for decentralized studies at the university level. Finnsnes Church is located in the center of the town.

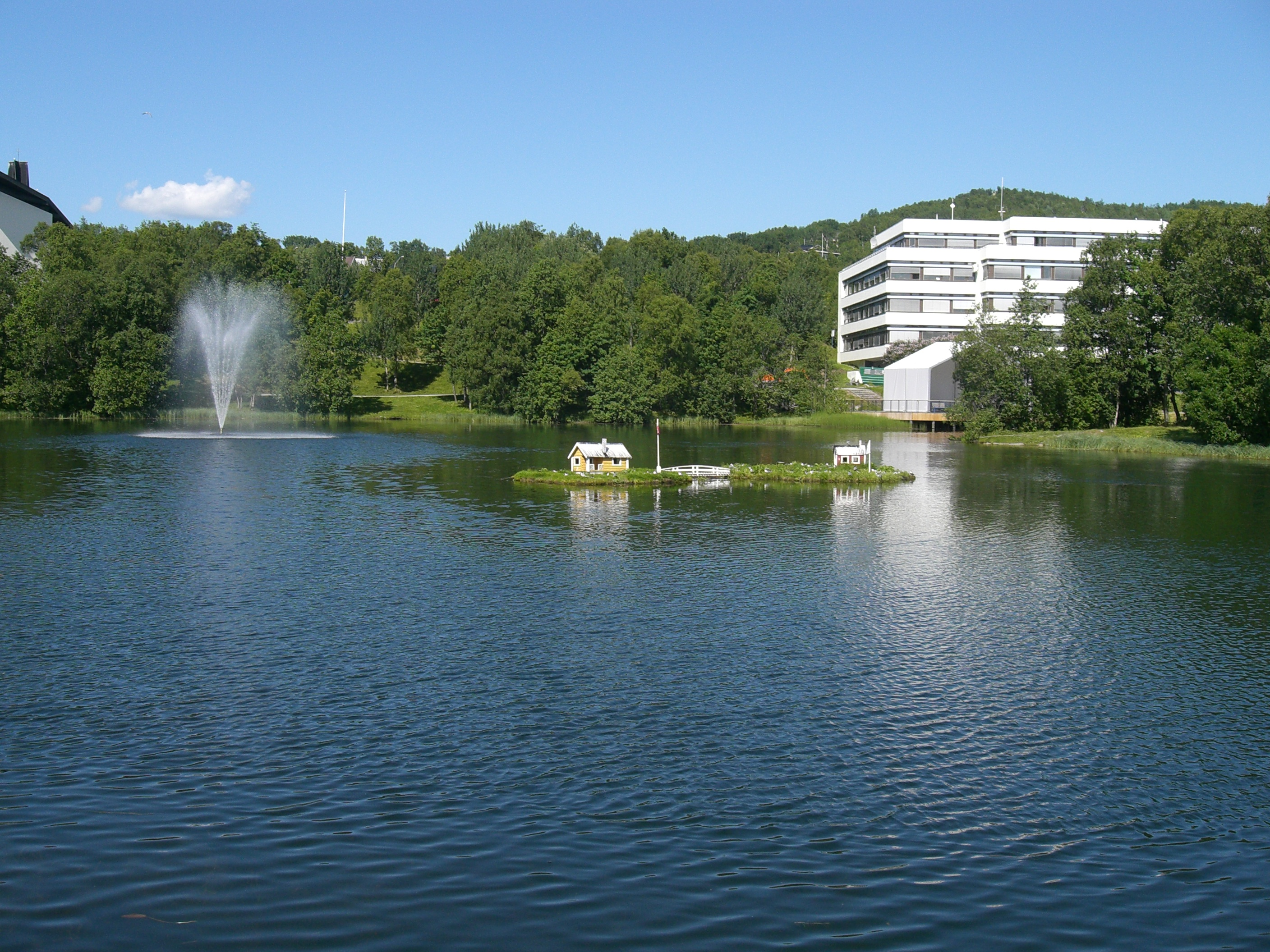
The City Hall and the park

Finnsnes has several small suburbs that surround it, forming one large urban area. These are Sandvika/Skogen, Finnfjordbotn, Nygård, Trollvika, and Silsand. Over the last 100 years, the town has grown from a small farm community into the center for commerce in the small region. Finnsnes has experienced extensive growth both commercially and industrially in the last few decades. In 2000, the village of Finnsnes was granted town status. The 3.37-square-kilometre (830-acre) town has a population (2023) of 4,917 and a population density of 1,459 inhabitants per square kilometre (3,780/sq mi).

== Transportation ==
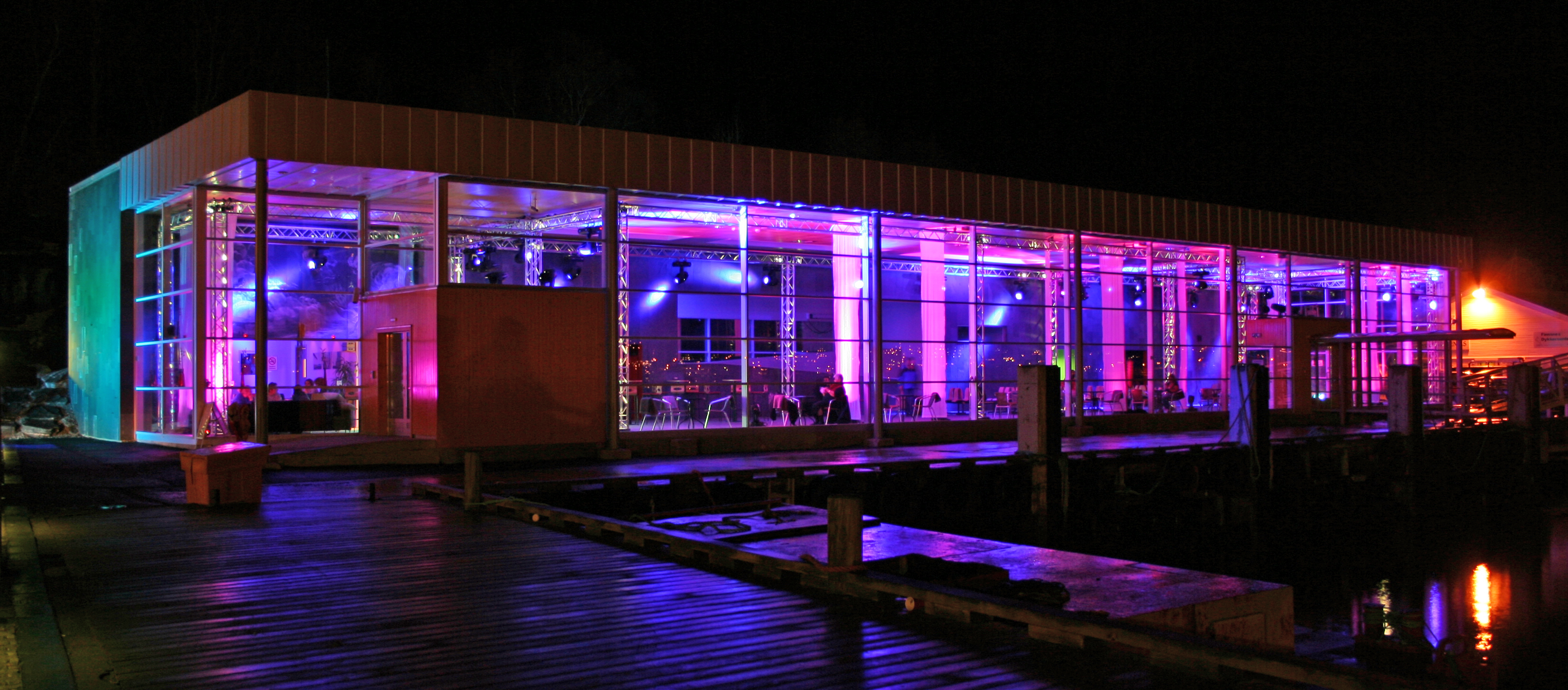
The harbour terminal in fall 2006

The town is the regional center for the Midt-Troms region, connected by boat with the city of Tromsø to the north, the town of Harstad to the southwest, and the town of Narvik to the south. The town is serviced by Bardufoss Airport (civilian and military), Finnfjord Havn (freight), and Finnsnes Terminal (shuttle busses, shuttle ships for Harstad and Tromsø, and the Hurtigruten).

Finnsnes is an important center for transportation both on land and sea. The coastal steamer has daily calls both northbound and southbound, and Tromsø and Harstad can be reached within a little more than an hour by speedboat. Finnsnes also hosts the main office of one of the biggest transportation companies in Norway, and the local bus company on Senja takes you to and from all parts of Senja. Norwegian County Road 86 runs through the town and across the Gisund Bridge connecting all of Senja to the mainland of Norway.

== Economy ==
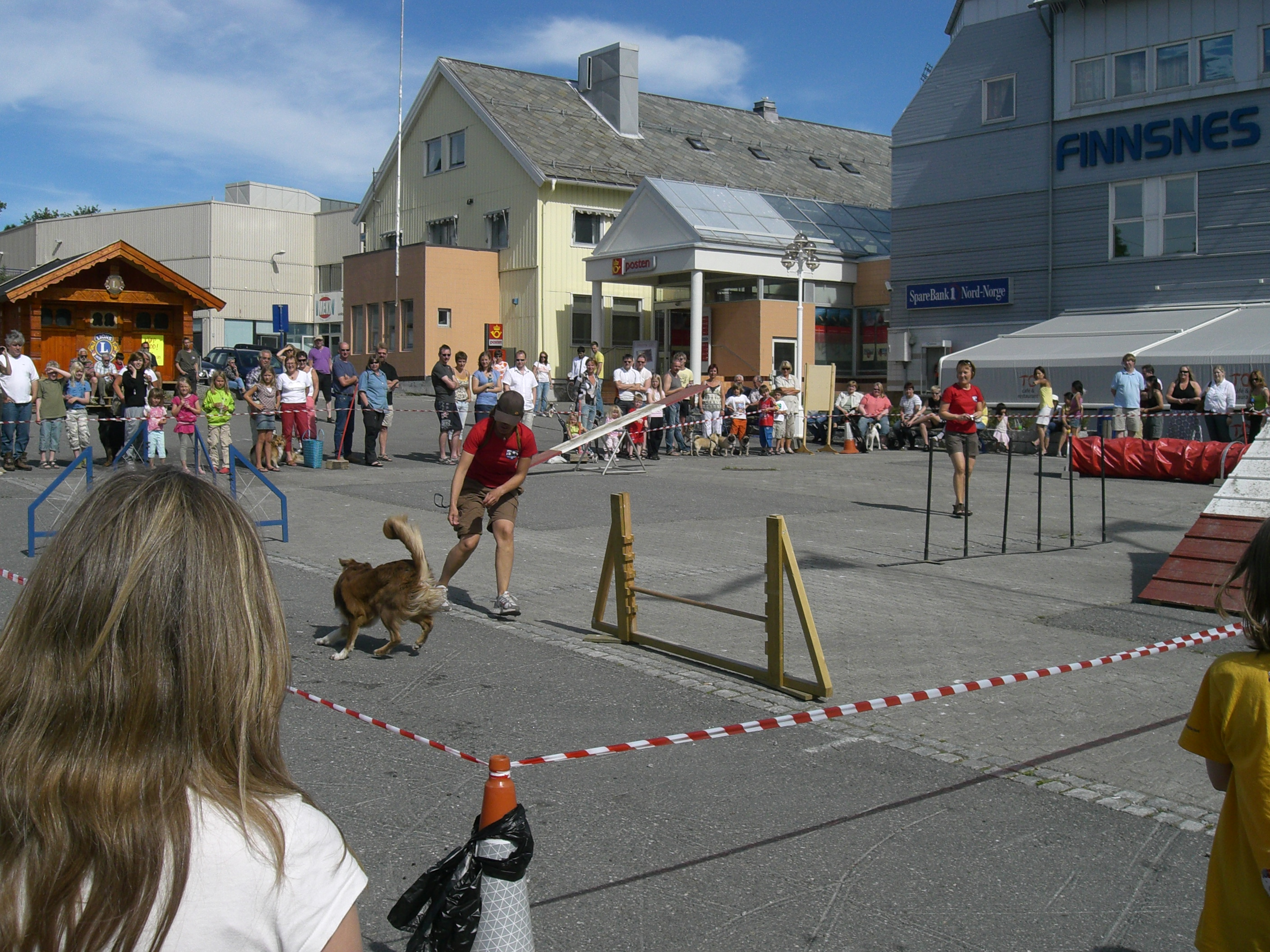
The town square in Finnsnes

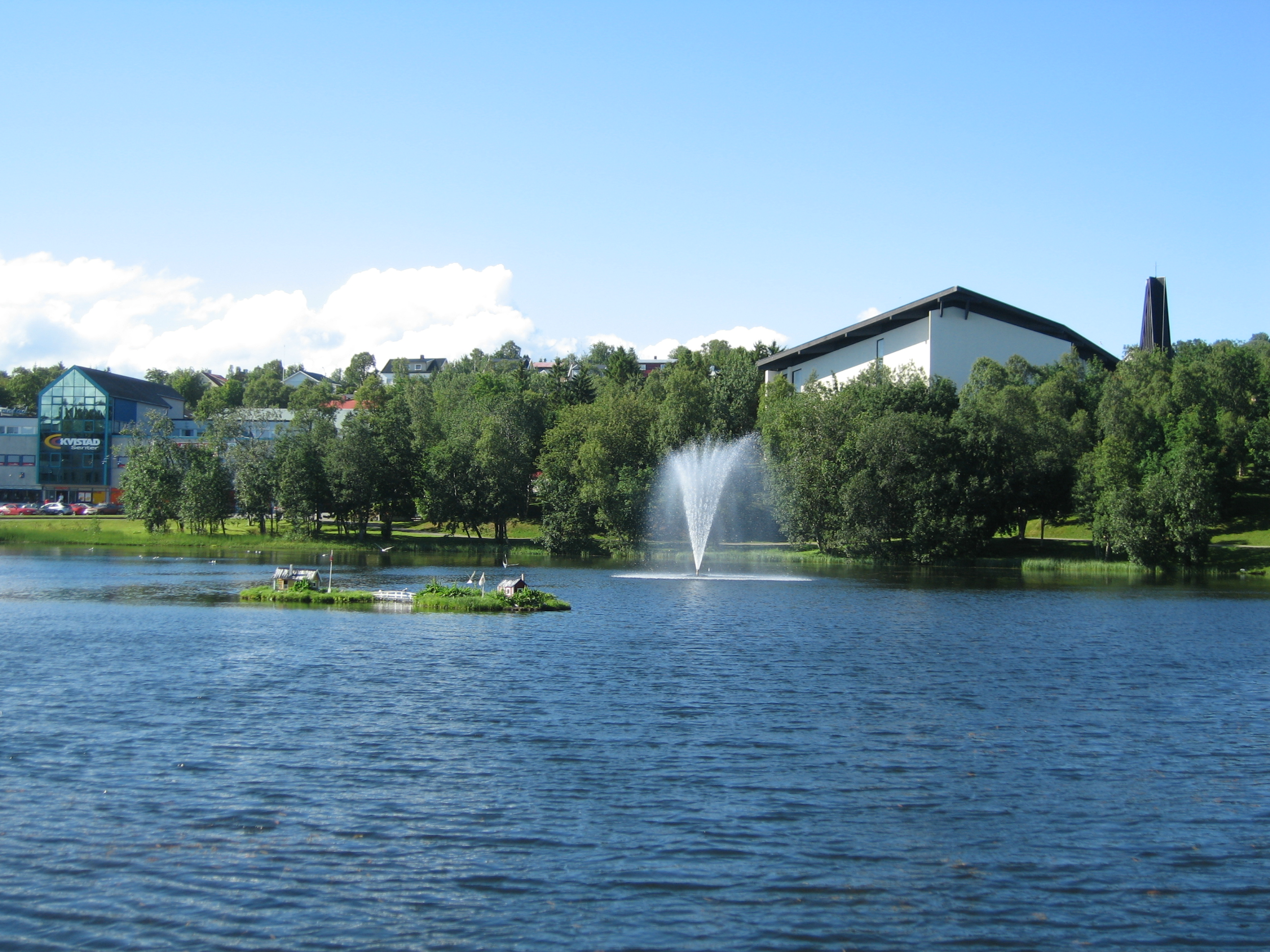
The central park located in the middle of Finnsnes, one of only two towns in Norway (the other is Stavanger) to have a park containing a natural lake

Senja and the surrounding region have gone through a positive development, having had the largest growth in trade and industry in Troms county, related to the size of the population. The municipality is making efforts to provide facilities for companies that plan to establish activity in the region. The millennium town of Finnsnes is also the regional center in the middle part of Troms, and a center of trade and service for about 35,000 people. Every summer, the town prepares for the one-week summer festival, "Finnsnes i Fest", aiming to put Finnsnes on the map. Finnsnes has two hotels. Good transportation connections make Finnsnes an attractive place for conferences. Trade and service employ many people, but Lenvik also has major companies for fish processing and fishing tackle, and a melting work. Fishing and agriculture are still very important, and fish farming is of increasing importance for the employment of people. Prospects of education are good in the municipality.

=== Gateway to Senja ===
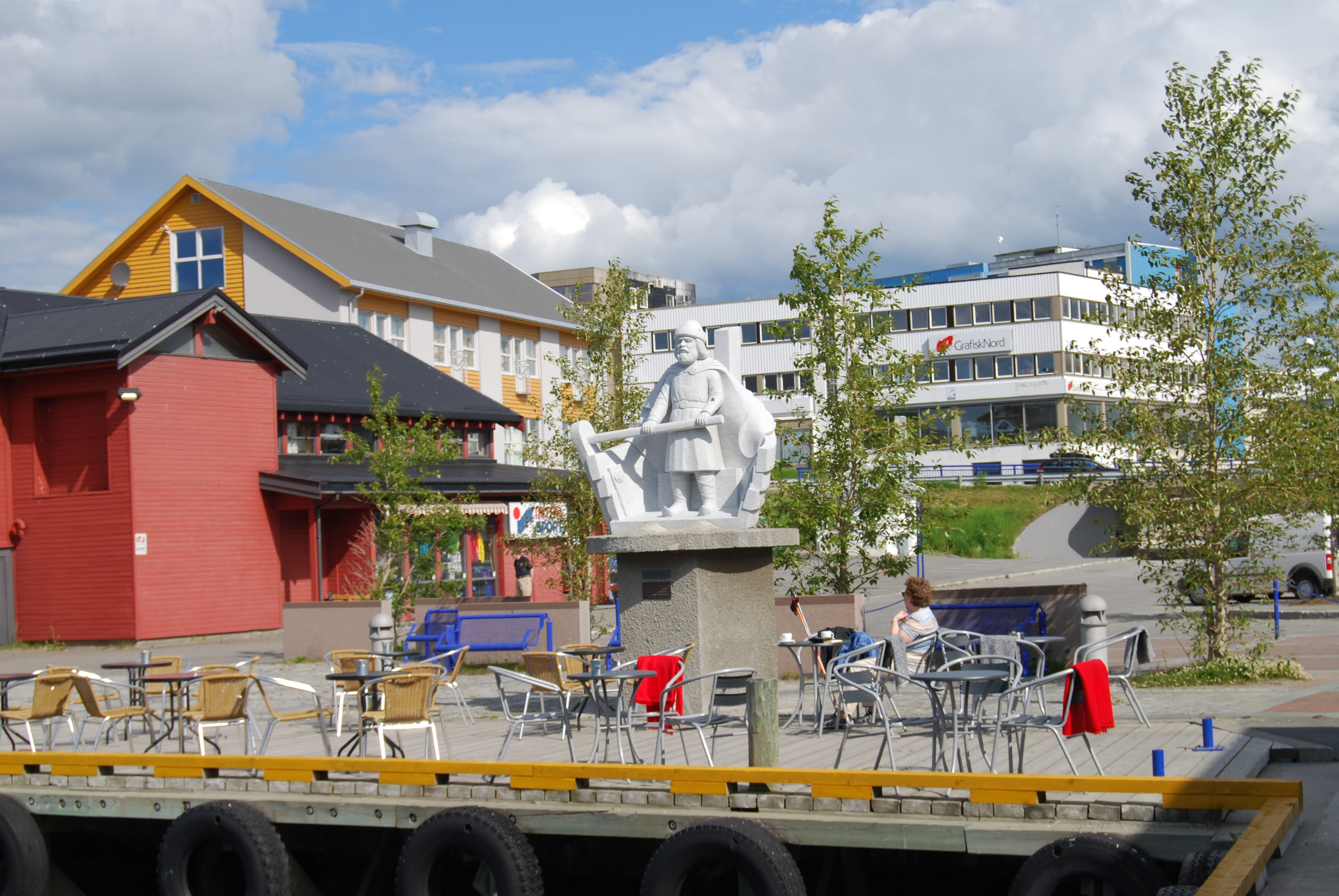
Ottar fra Hålogaland was a Viking Age seafarer and in recent years his statue overlooking the harbor has become a symbol of Finnsnes and the town's mascot

The town has become known as the Gateway to Senja: the land of contrasts, which brands itself being the Fairytale Island (Eventyrøya). There are several attractions in Finnsnes and the nearby island of Senja and for tourists, Finnsnes is the reference point when sightseeing in the region. The island is also called the Island of Adventure and is a Norway in miniature with mountains and fjords, small communities, nature, culture and people, hospitality and go-ahead spirit, and all kinds of weather.

== Sports and culture ==
Finnsnes has several indoor halls for sports and facilities for both alpine and cross-country skiing. There is also a variety of cultural activities. The Finnsnes House of Culture, which opened in 1995, is the cultural center of the region. It contains a 400-seat hall for theatre and concerts and provides a varied menu of local, national, and international performers and stars. The public library of Lenvik is also situated in this building.

“Midt-Tromshallen” is an indoor soccer center for the region, and at the same time a hall made for a variety of activities. There are also two major outdoor football stadiums at Finnsnes and Silsand. The local museum at Bjorelvnes is located about 15 kilometres (9.3 mi) north of Finnsnes.

There are three soccer clubs in the town, Finnsnes IL playing in the second division, IL Pioner playing in the fifth division, and FK Senja also playing in the second division. Over the years there has been an extensive rivalry between the clubs Finnsnes IL and FK Senja, this being largely due to the geography of the town.
