= Gisundet =

Strait in Troms county, Norway

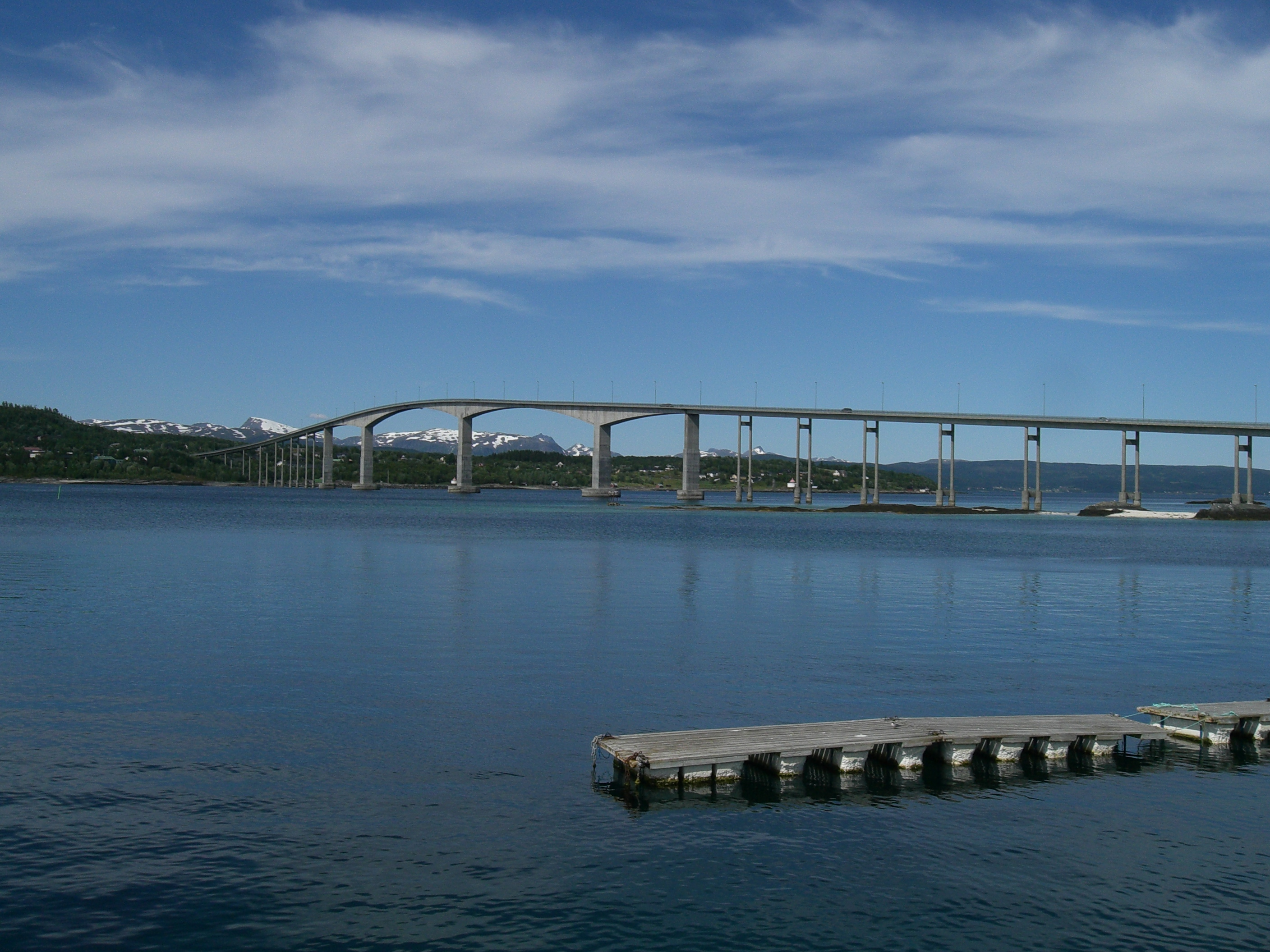
- View of the bridge crossing the strait
- Interactive map of the fjord
- Location: Troms county, Norway
- Coordinates: 69.2212°N 17.9476°E
- Type: Strait
- Basin countries: Norway
- Max. length: 35 kilometres (22 mi)
- Settlements: Finnsnes

Gisundet is a strait in Senja Municipality in Troms county, Norway. The 35-kilometre (22 mi) long strait separates the island of Senja from the mainland. The strait flows into the Malangen fjord in the north and into the Finnfjorden (and later the Solbergfjorden) in the south. The strait is crossed by the Gisund Bridge which connects the village of Silsand on the island to the town of Finnsnes on the mainland.
