= Norwegian County Road 86 =

Highway in Troms county, Norway

County Road 86

Route information
- Length: 110 km (68 mi)

Major junctions
- East end: E6 at Andselv
- Fv84 at Sørreisa; Fv855 at Finnfjordbotn; Fv861 at Silsand; Fv860 at Islandsbotn; Fv862 at Straumsbotn
- West end: Torsken

Location
- Country: Norway
- Counties: Troms

Highway system
- Roads in Norway; National Roads; County Roads

County Road 86 (Norwegian: Fylkesvei 86) is a 110-kilometre-long (68 mi) highway in Troms county, Norway. The eastern end of the road begins in the village of Andselv (in the Bardufoss area of Målselv Municipality). It then heads west to the Gisund Bridge connecting the mainland of Norway to the large island of Senja. The road then heads across the island of Senja to the village of Torsken on the western coast of Senja Municipality. Part of the route is one of eighteen designated National Tourist Routes in Norway.
