= Breitinden =

Mountain in Troms, Norway

Breitinden (Norwegian); Reaiddaidčohkka (Northern Sami)
- Breidtinden (historic spelling)
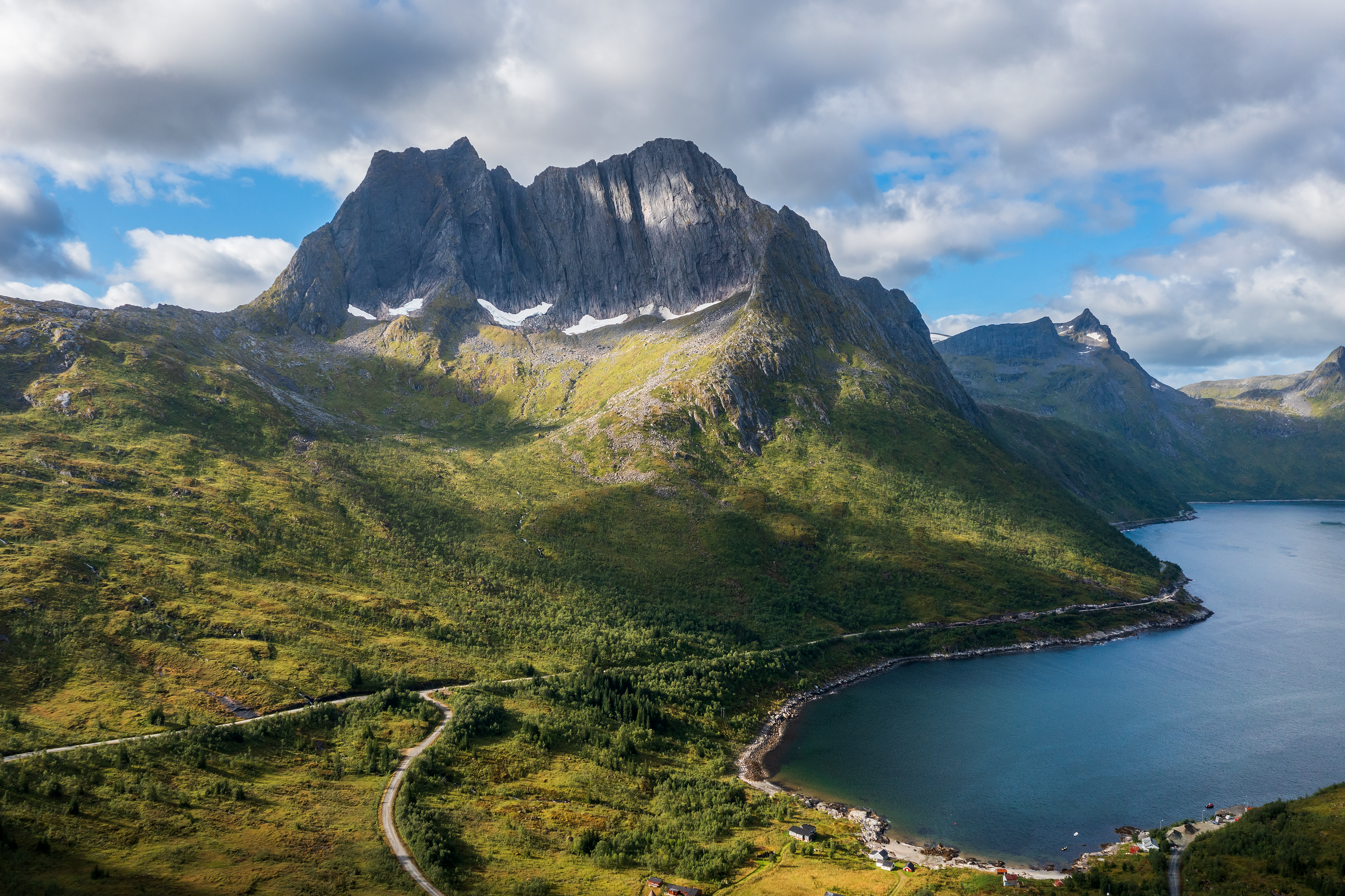

Highest point
- Elevation: 1,001 m (3,284 ft)
- Prominence: 1,001 m (3,284 ft)
- Isolation: 25.82 to 25.84 km (16.04 to 16.06 mi)
- Coordinates: 69.4554°N 17.6485°E

Geography
- Interactive map of the mountain
- Location: Troms, Norway
- Topo map: 1433 IV Mefjordbotn

Breitinden (Norwegian) or Reaiddaidčohkka (Northern Sami) is the highest mountain on the island of Senja in Troms county, Norway. It is located in Senja Municipality, southeast of the Medfjorden and southwest of the village of Medfjordbotn. The village of Senjahopen lies about 10 kilometres (6.2 mi) northwest of the mountain. The lake Svartholvatnet is located along the southwestern base of the mountain.
