= Finnsnes Church =

- Finnsnes kirke
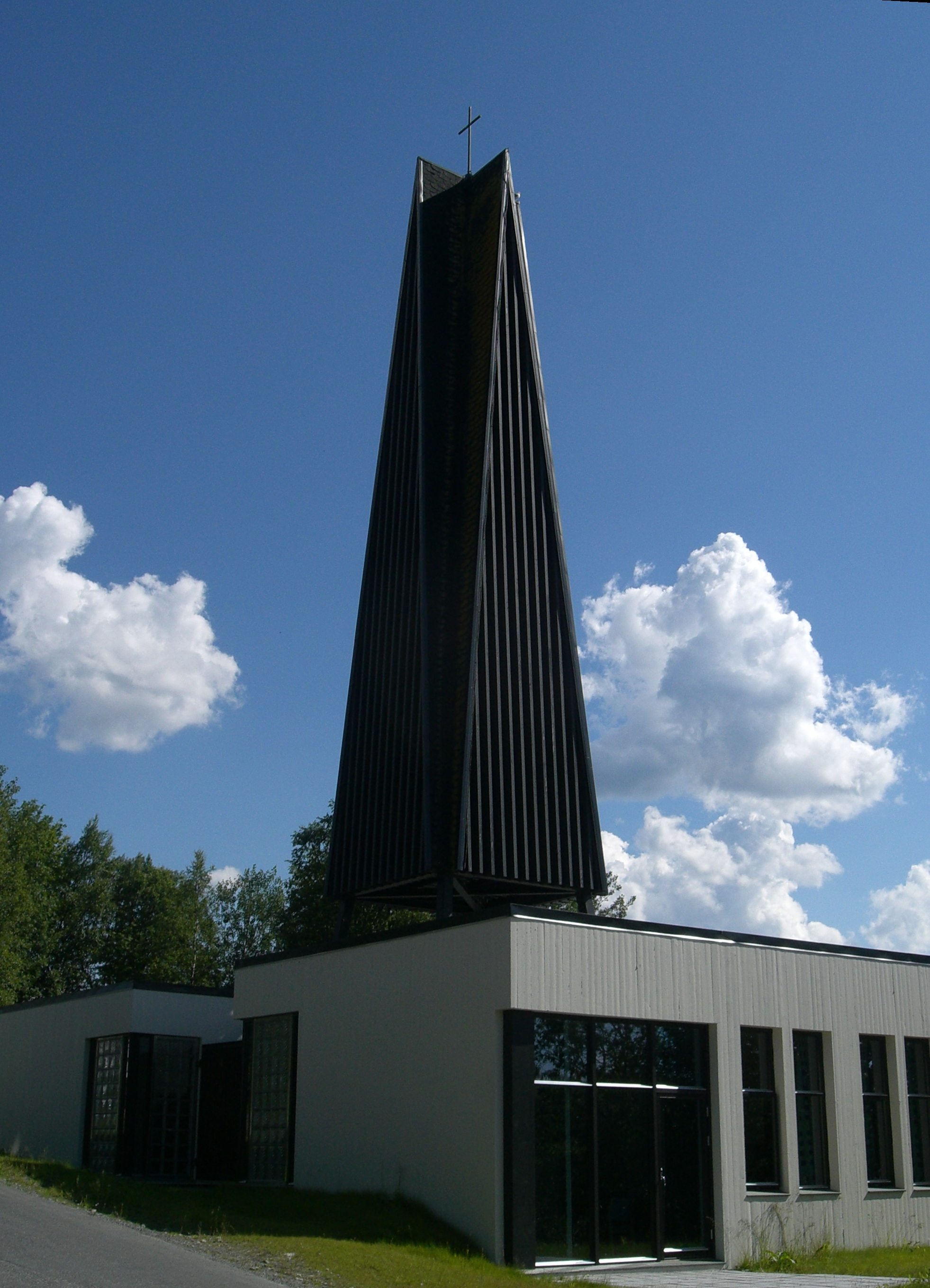
- View of the church
- Finnsnes Church
- 69.231169°N 17.984297°E
- Location: Senja Municipality, Troms
- Country: Norway
- Denomination: Church of Norway
- Churchmanship: Evangelical Lutheran

History
- Status: Parish church
- Founded: 1979
- Consecrated: 1979

Architecture
- Functional status: Active
- Architect: Nils Toft
- Architectural type: Fan-shaped
- Completed: 1979 (47 years ago)

Specifications
- Capacity: 750
- Materials: Brick

Administration
- Diocese: Nord-Hålogaland
- Deanery: Senja prosti
- Parish: Lenvik

Finnsnes Church (Norwegian: Finnsnes kirke) is a parish church of the Church of Norway in Senja Municipality in Troms county, Norway. It is located in the central part of the town of Finnsnes. It is a church in the Lenvik parish which is part of the Senja prosti (deanery) in the Diocese of Nord-Hålogaland. The white, brick church was built in a fan-shaped style in 1979 using plans drawn up by the architect Nils Toft. The church seats about 750 people. The building was consecrated by Bishop Kristen Kyrre Bremer.

== Media gallery ==
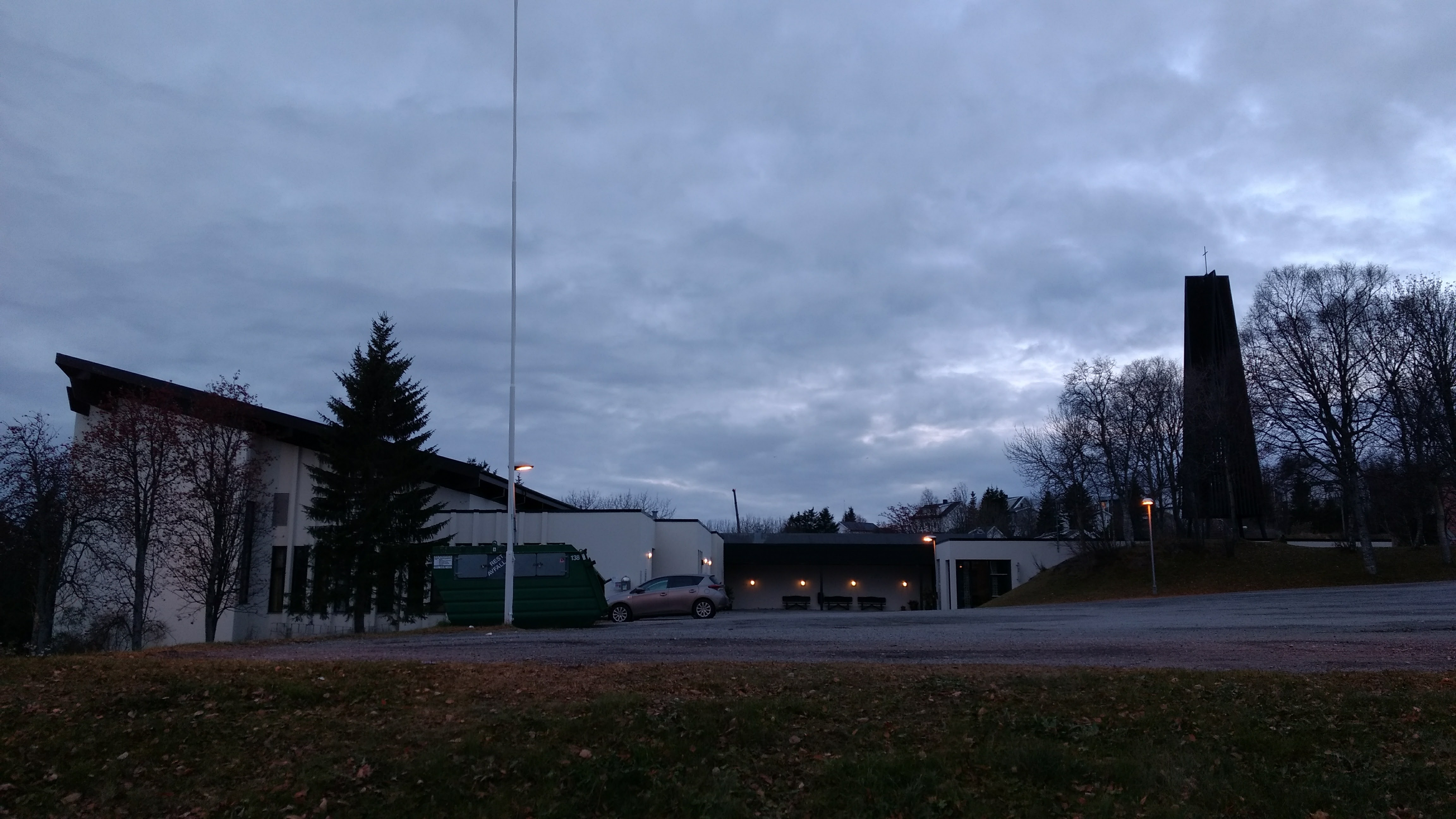

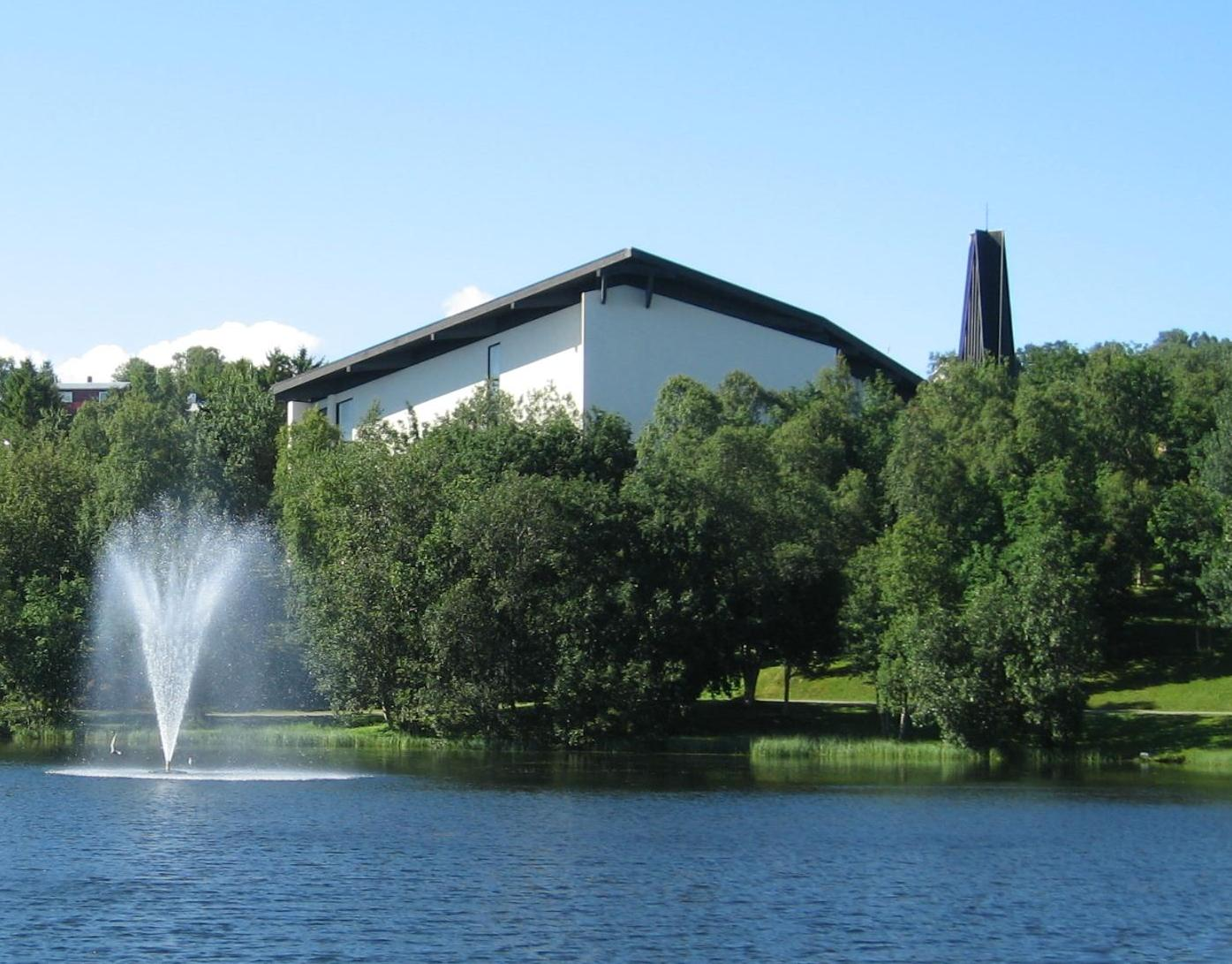

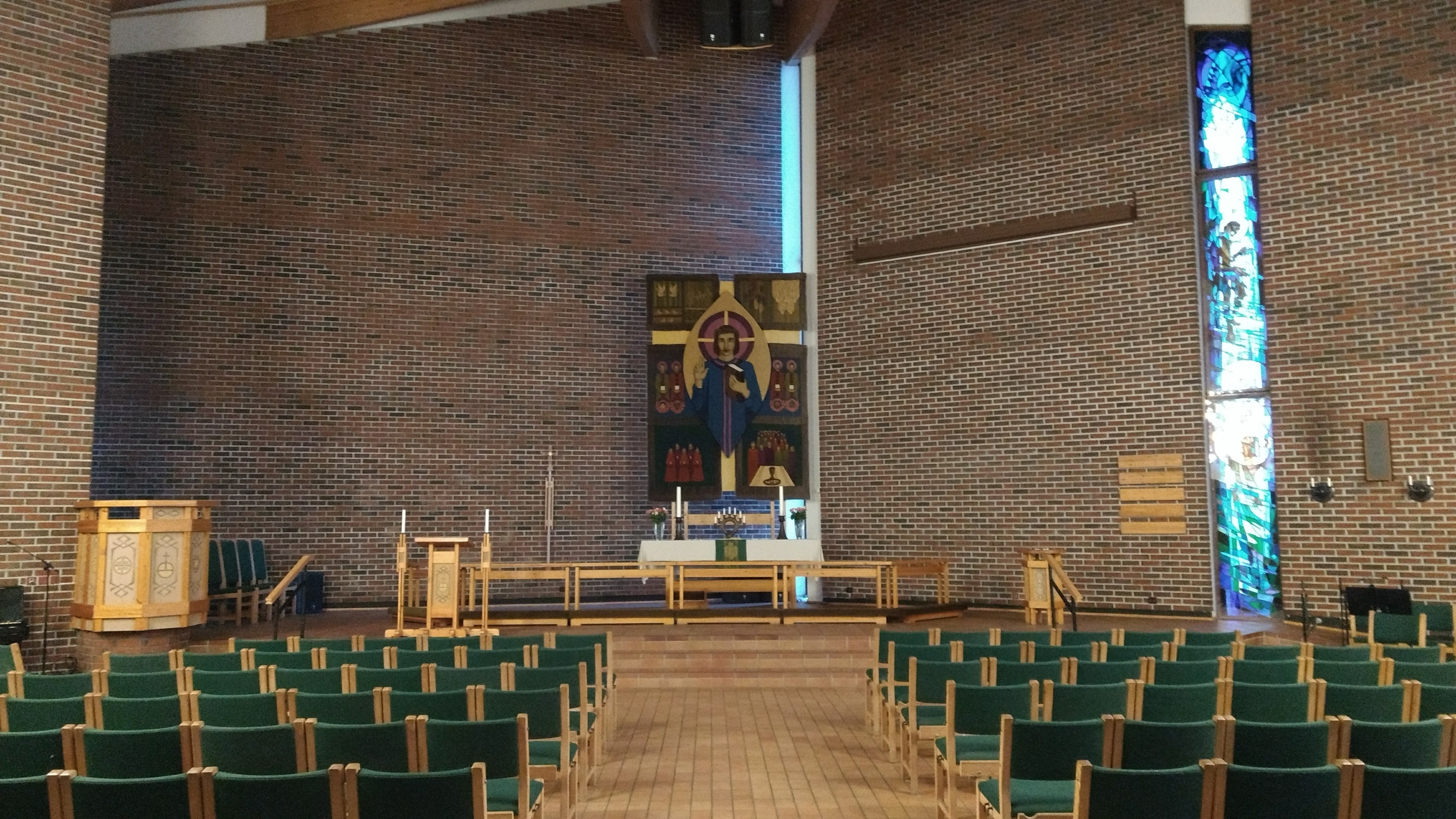

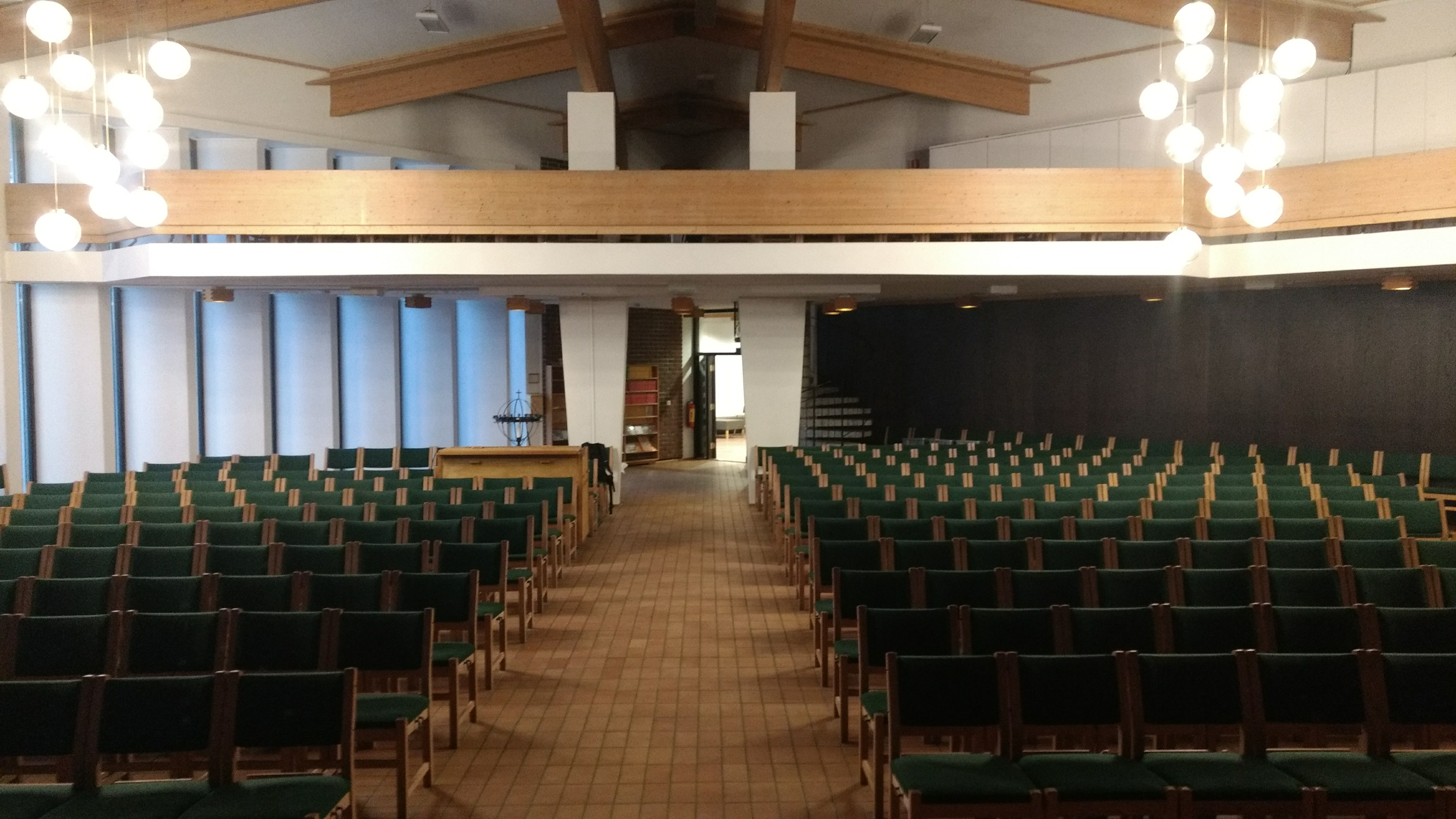

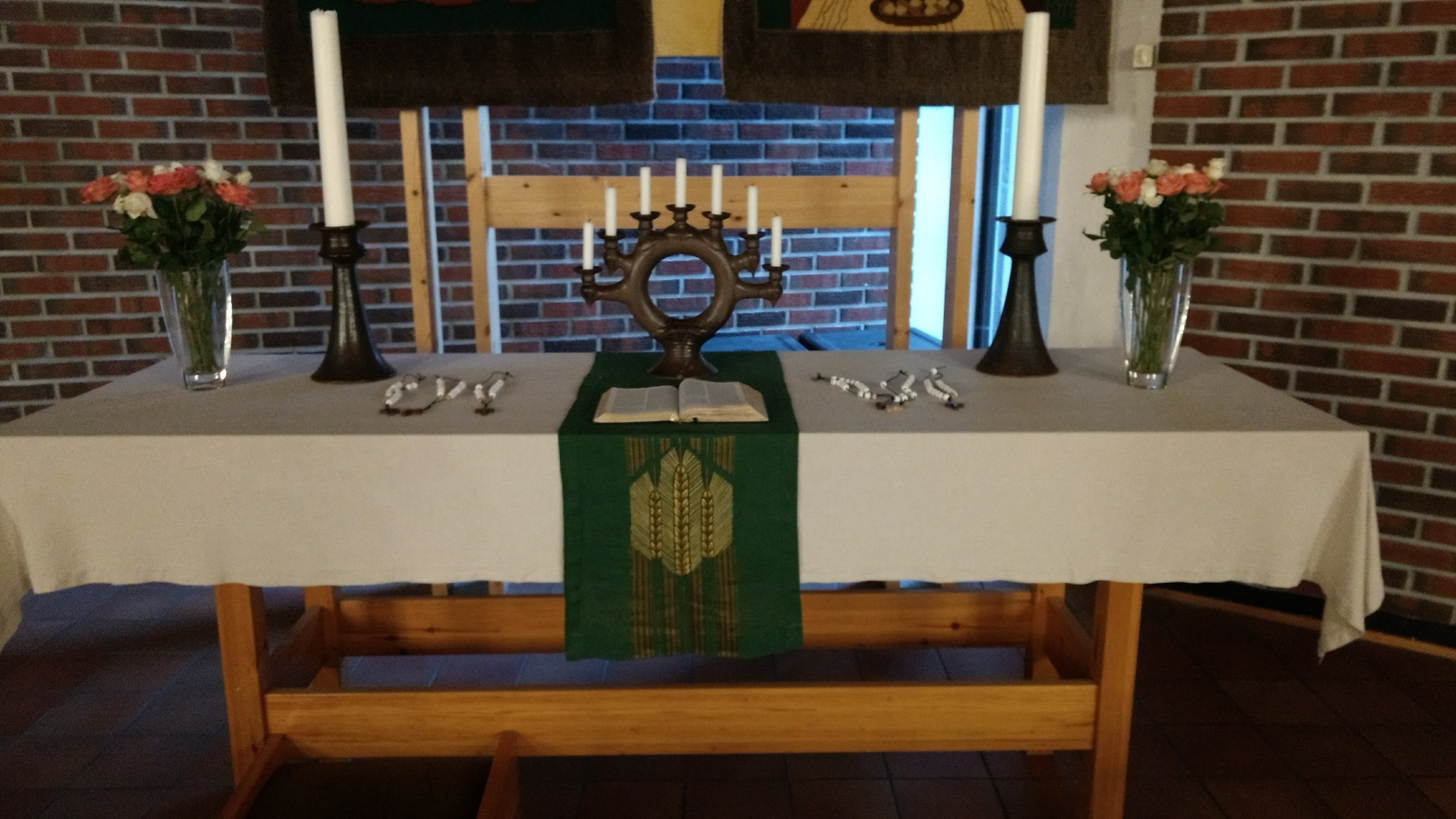

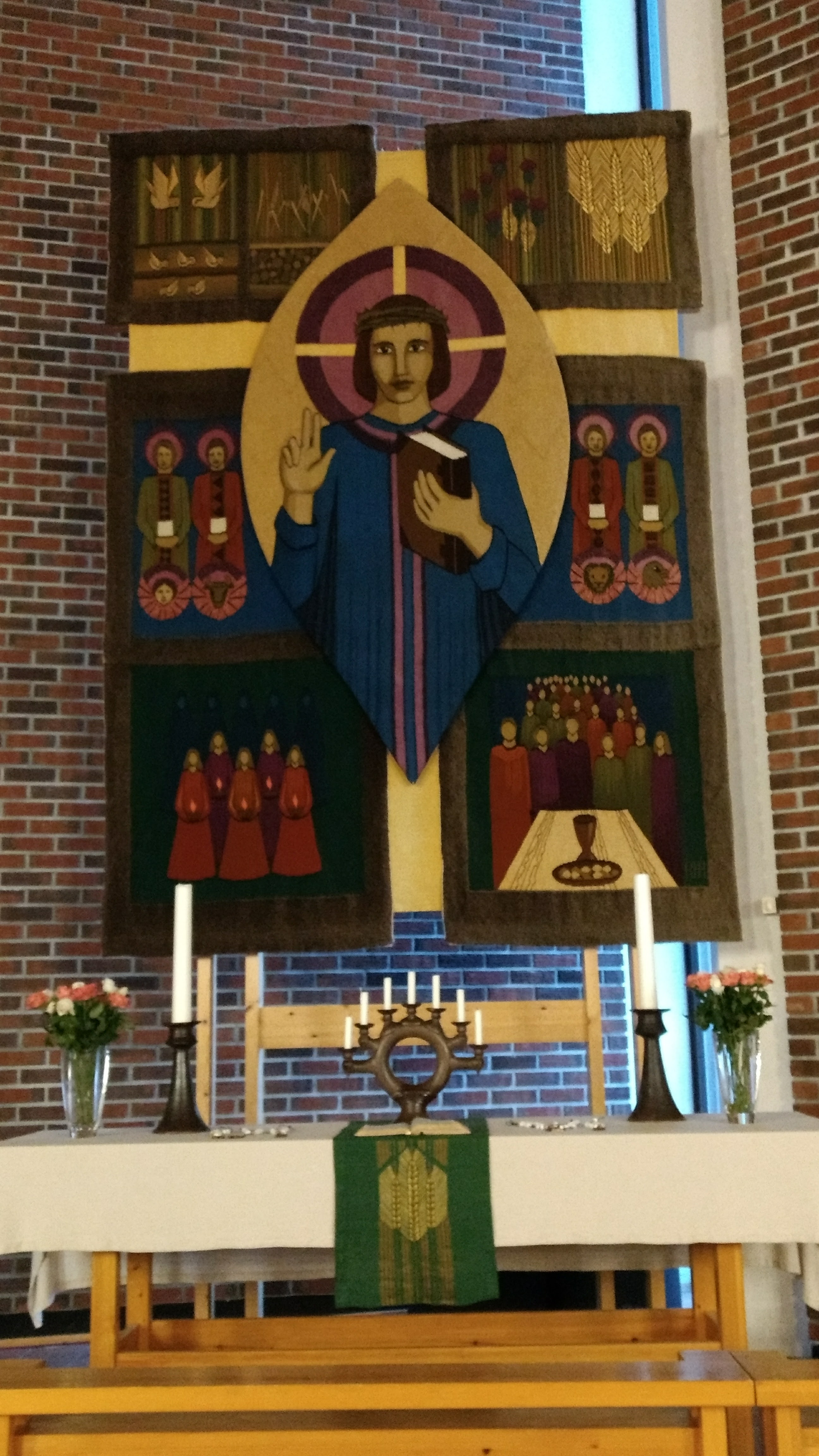

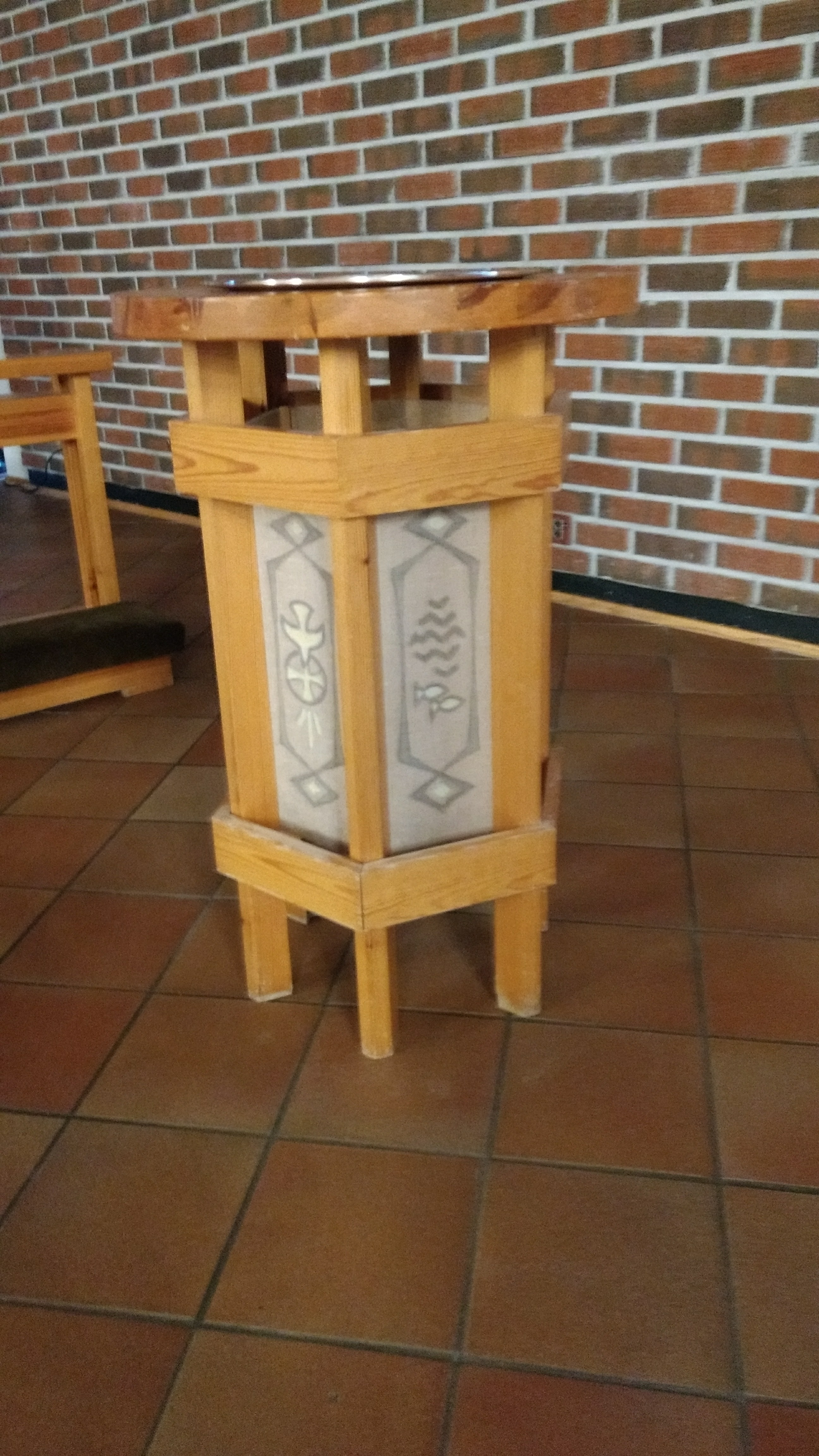

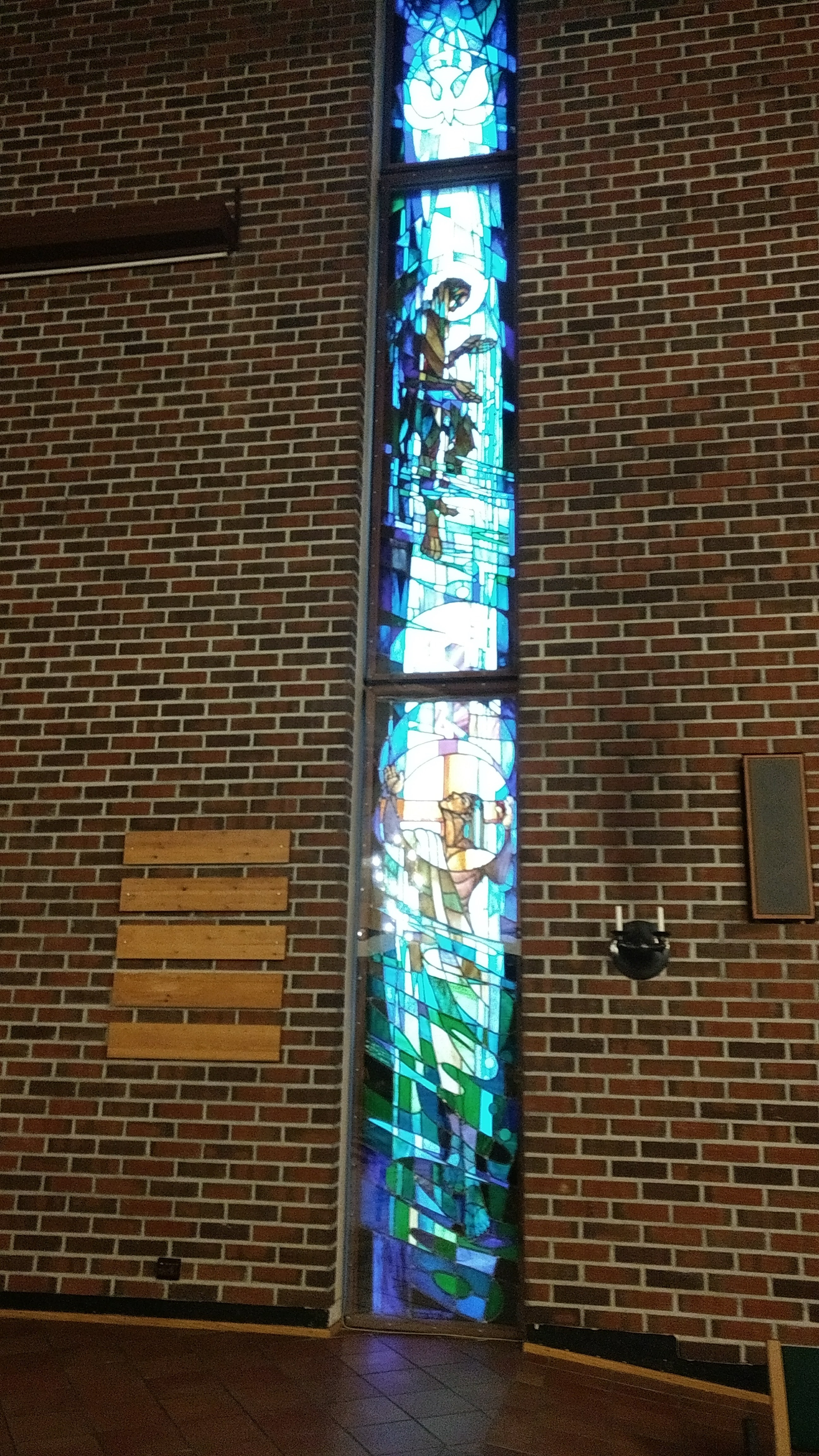

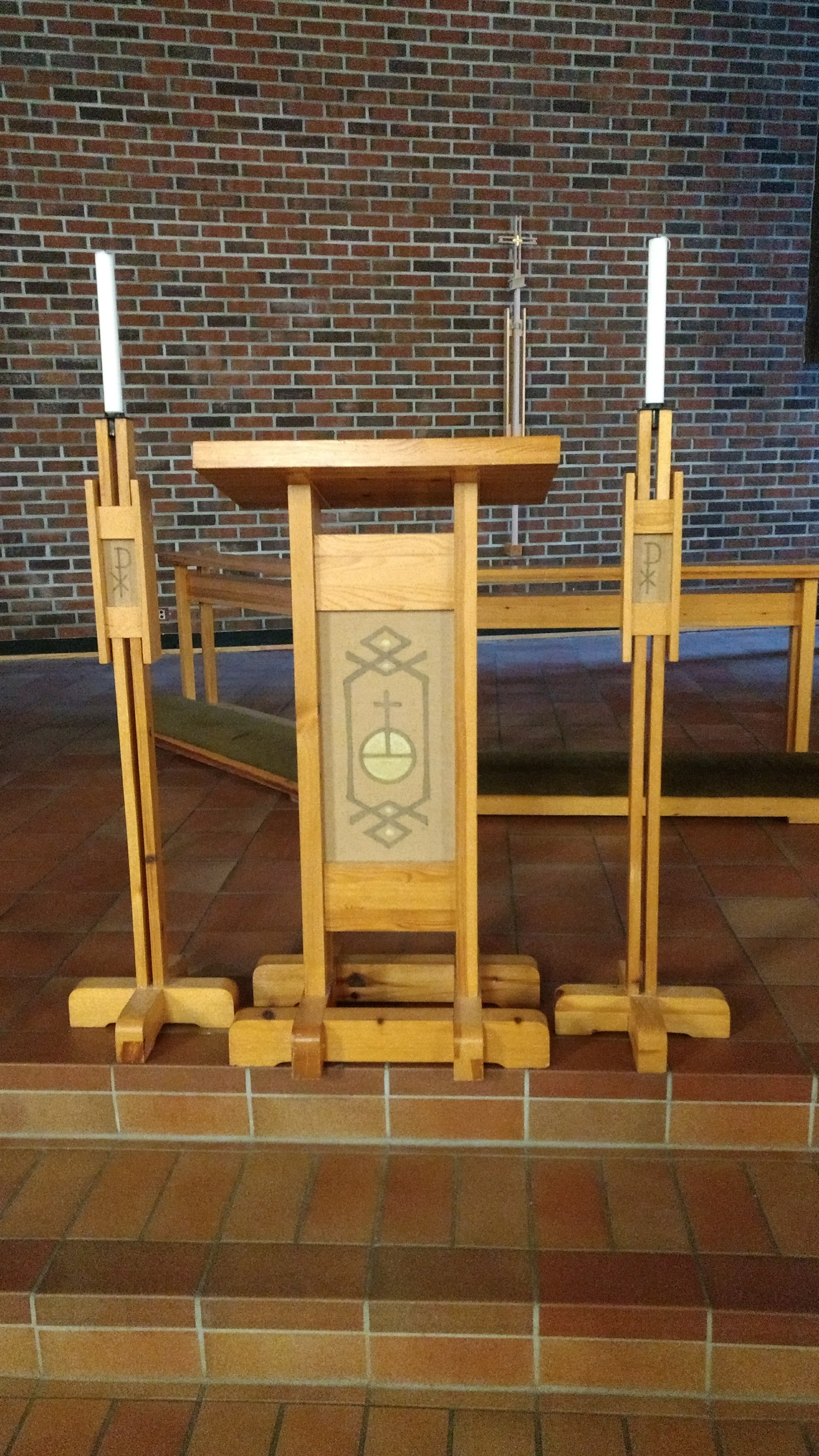

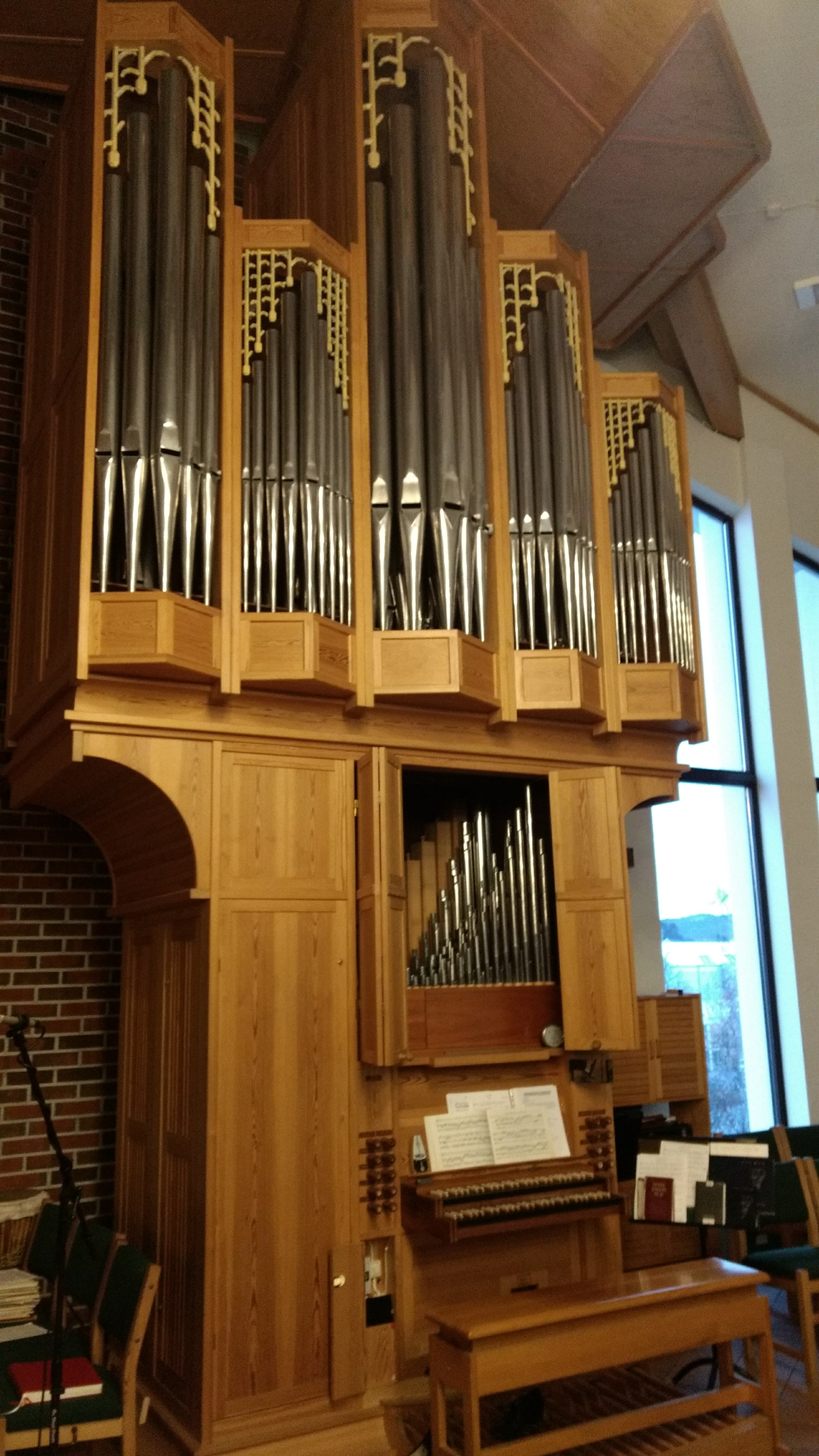

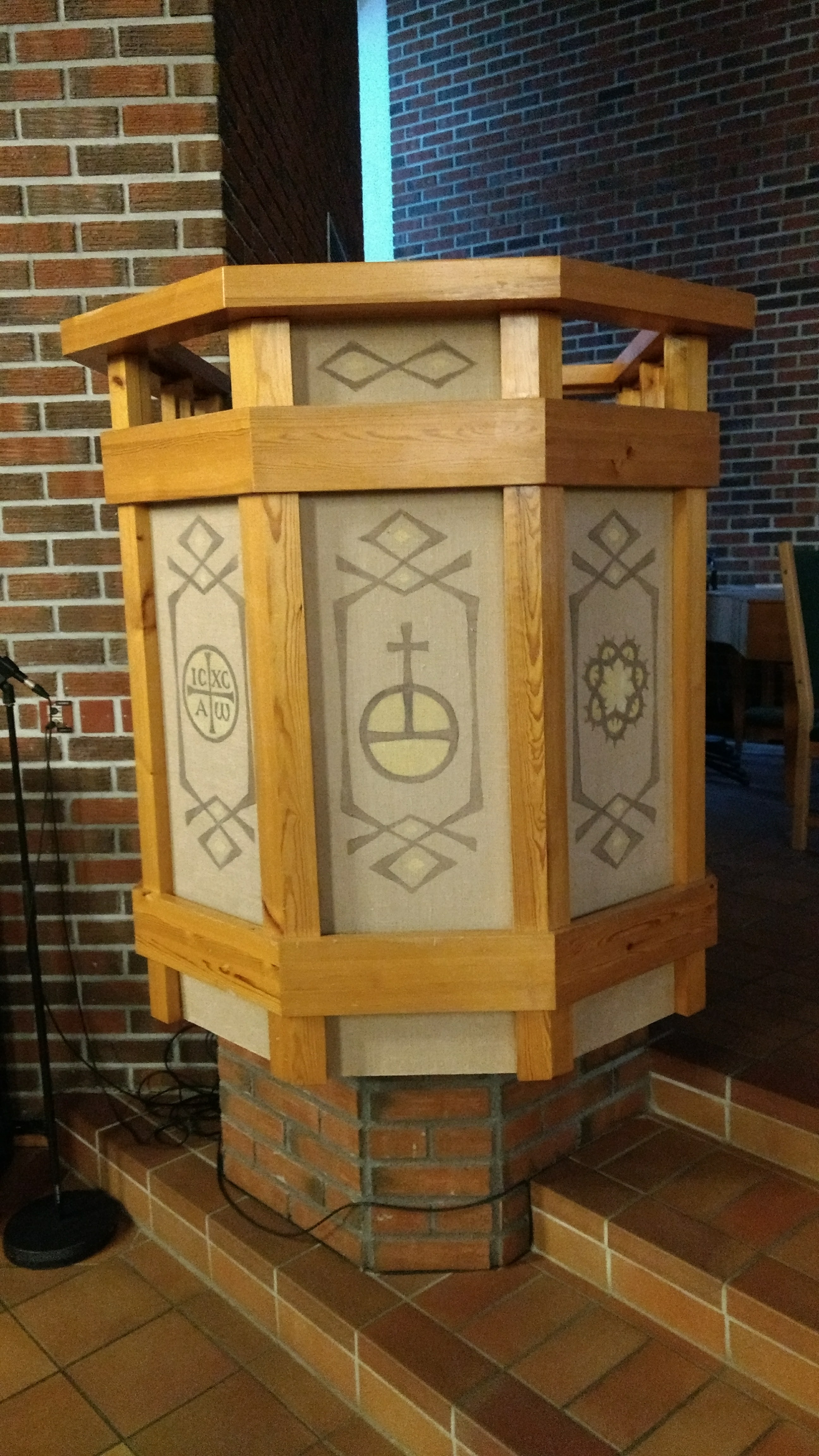

== See also ==
- List of churches in Nord-Hålogaland
