= Gisund Bridge =

Bridge in Finnmark county, Norway

Gisund Bridge Gisundbrua
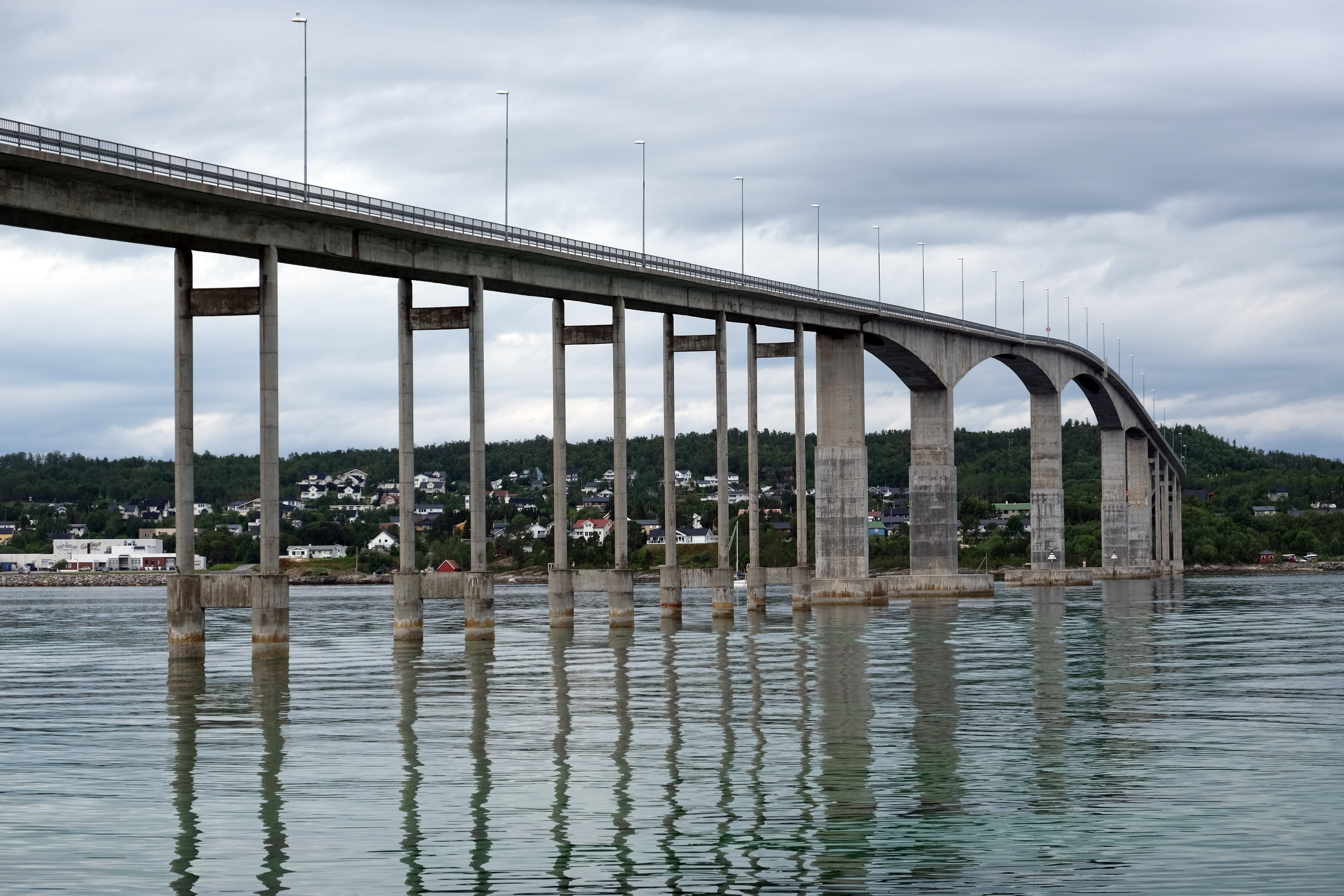
- View of the bridge
- Coordinates: 69°14′30″N 017°58′08″E
- Carries: Fv86
- Crosses: Gisundet
- Locale: Senja, Norway

Characteristics
- Total length: 1,147 metres (3,763 ft)
- Longest span: 143 metres (469 ft)
- No. of spans: 25
- Clearance below: 41 metres (135 ft)

History
- Opened: 23 June 1972

Location
- Interactive map of Gisund Bridge

Gisund Bridge (Norwegian: Gisundbrua) is a cantilever road bridge on Norwegian County Road 86 in Senja Municipality in Troms county, Norway. The bridge crosses the Gisundet strait from the town of Finnsnes on the mainland to the village of Silsand on the island of Senja. The 1,147-metre-long (3,763 ft) bridge has 25 spans, the main span being 143 metres (469 ft) long. The maximum clearance to the sea below the bridge is 41 metres (135 ft). Gisund Bridge was opened on 23 June 1972.

== History ==
The bridge was opened on 23 June 1972 by Crown Prince Harald. It is 1,147 metres (3,763 ft) long, with a main span of 142.5 metres (468 ft). The bridge has a clearance of 41 metres (135 ft) and consists of 25 spans. It was originally financed through tolls, but the tolls have long since been paid off. On some maps, the bridge is incorrectly referred to as the "Trangstraumen Bridge".

== See also ==
- List of bridges in Norway
- List of bridges in Norway by length
- List of bridges
- List of bridges by length
