= Finnfjordbotn =

Finnfjordbotn: Finnfjordbotn (Norwegian); Vuotnabahta (Northern Sami)
- Village
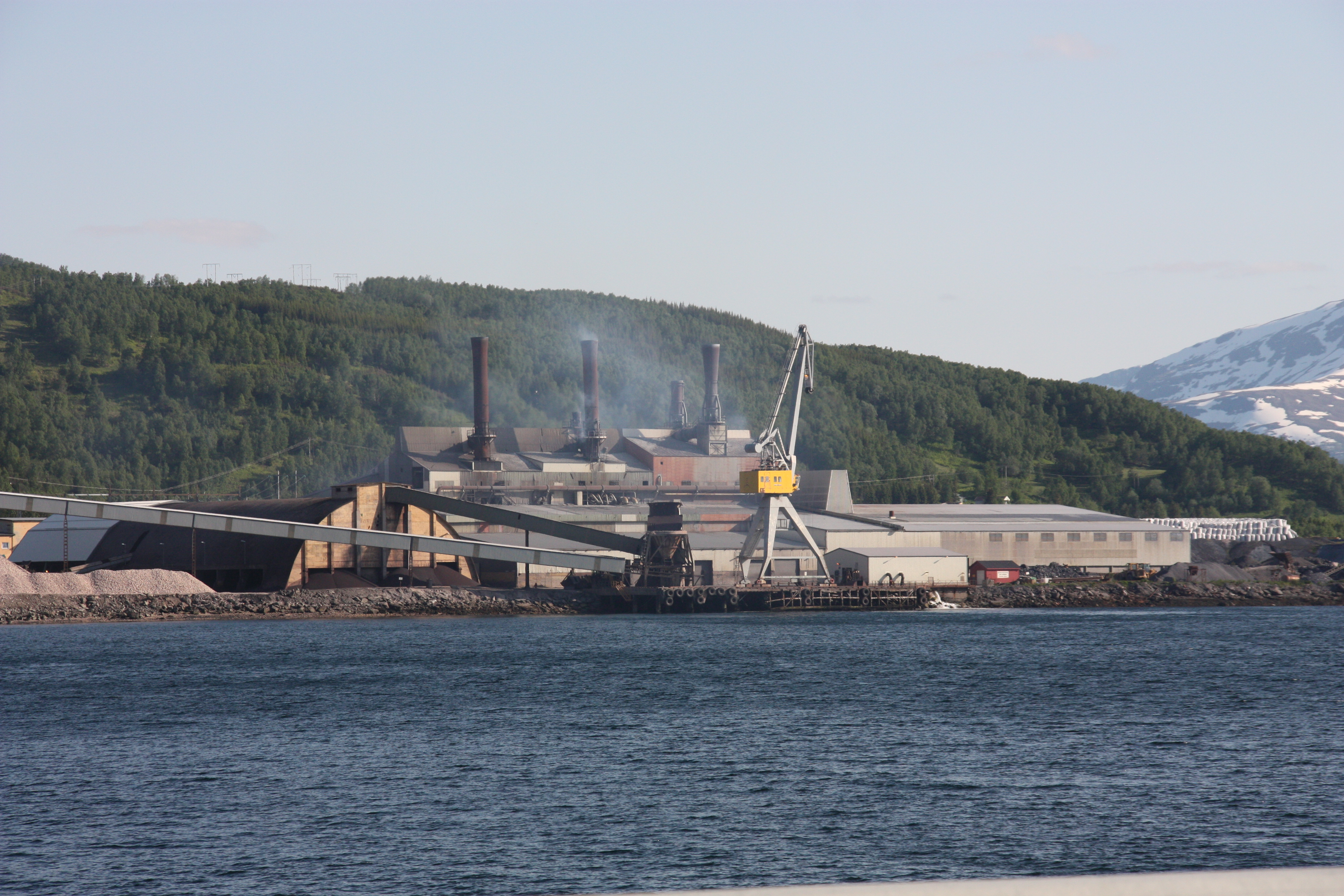
- Finnfjord smelteverk in Finnfjordbotn
- Nickname: Finnsnes Øst
- Interactive map of Finnfjordbotn
- Location within Troms Location within Norway
- Coordinates: 69°13′50″N 18°5′20″E
- Country: Norway
- Region: Northern Norway
- County: Troms
- District: Midt-Troms
- Municipality: Senja Municipality
- Elevation: 14 m (46 ft)
- Time zone: UTC+01:00 (CET)
  - Summer (DST): UTC+02:00 (CEST)
- Post Code: 9300 Silsand

Finnfjordbotn (Norwegian) or Vuotnabahta (Northern Sami), popularly known as Finnsnes Øst, is a village in Senja Municipality in Troms county, Norway. It is a suburb of the neighboring town of Finnsnes and is located 4 km (2.5 mi) east of the city center at the intersection where Norwegian County Road 86 and Norwegian County Road 855 meet. The district, which has approx. 600 inhabitants (with Finnfjord 783 inhabitants, 2009), includes some housing estates from the 1970s and 1980s, but it is especially the industry that is dominant. At Botnhågen, there are several small industries and other commercial buildings, including a bakery, waste incineration plant, car dealers and car inspections 1.5 km (0.93 mi) south towards Sørreisa is the Finnfjord smelter.

Finnfjord smelter is located in Finnfjordbotn and produces approximately 100,000 tonnes of ferrosilicon a year.
