= Silsand =

Village in Senja Municipality, Norway

Silsand (Norwegian); Silsáddu (Northern Sami)
- Village
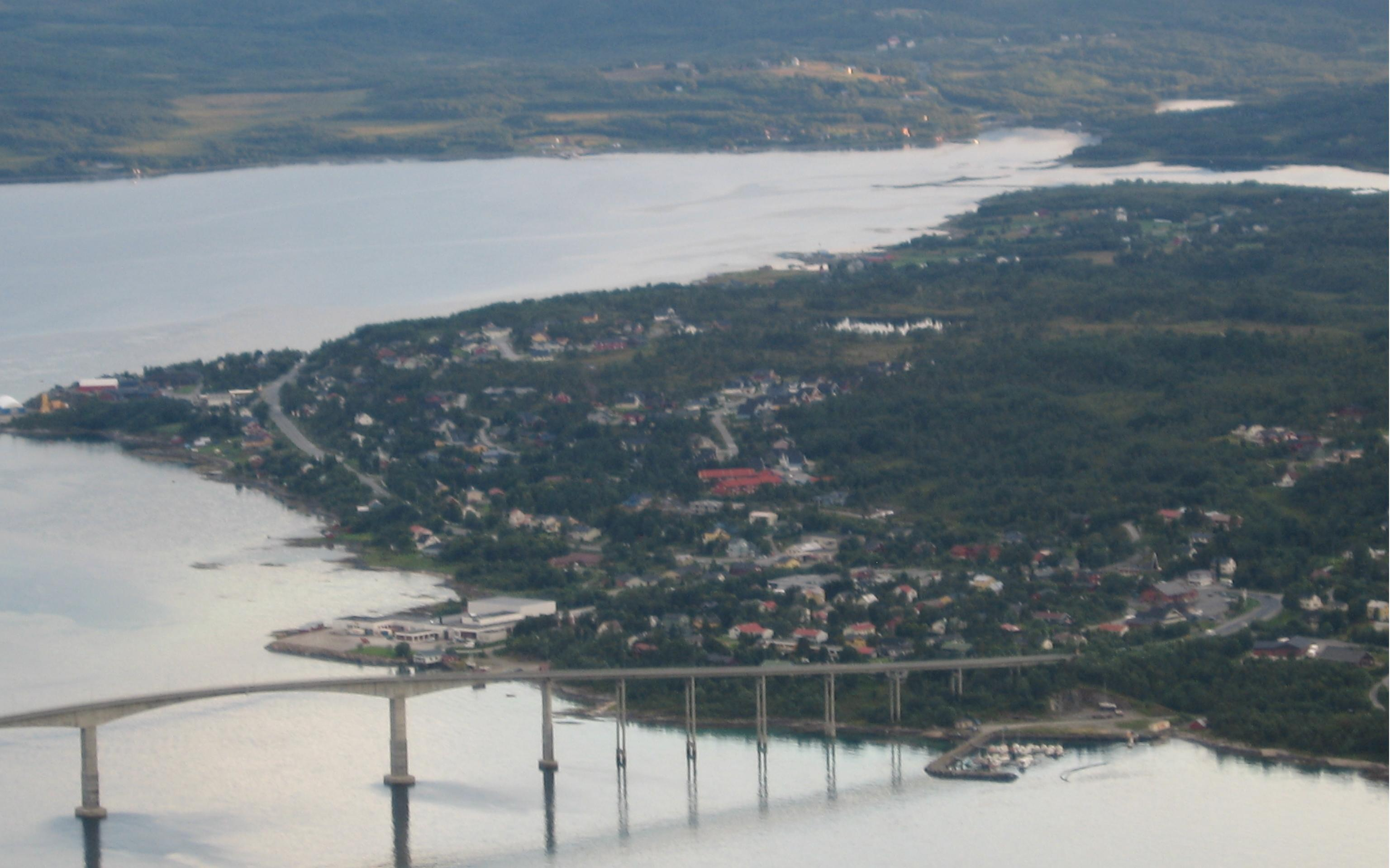
- View of Silsand with the bridge to Finnsnes
- Interactive map of: Silsand (Norwegian); Silsáddu (Northern Sami)
- Location within Troms Location within Norway
- Coordinates: 69°14′19″N 17°56′20″E
- Country: Norway
- Region: Northern Norway
- County: Troms
- District: Midt-Troms
- Municipality: Senja Municipality

Area
  - Total: 1.07 km^{2} (0.41 sq mi)
- Elevation: 12 m (39 ft)

Population (2023)
  - Total: 1,638
  - Density: 1,531/km^{2} (3,970/sq mi)
- Time zone: UTC+01:00 (CET)
  - Summer (DST): UTC+02:00 (CEST)
- Post Code: 9303 Silsand

Silsand (Norwegian) or Silsáddu (Northern Sami) is a village in Senja Municipality in Troms county, Norway. It is located on the eastern shore of the large island of Senja. The 1.07-square-kilometre (260-acre) village has a population (2023) of 1,638 and a population density of 1,531 inhabitants per square kilometre (3,970/sq mi).

Silsand is now considered a suburb of the neighboring town of Finnsnes, which is located across the Gisundet strait on the mainland. Before the construction of the Gisund Bridge, Silsand consisted of just a few houses. With the construction of the bridge and the change in rural Norwegian demographics, the population has experienced a rapid increase since the early 1980s. Most of the new inhabitants come from other smaller villages in the Midt-Troms area.

Silsand has three schools: Småslettan skole (1-4th grade), Silsand barneskole (5-7th grade) and Silsand ungdomsskole (8-10th grade). FK Senja, a football club, is also based in Silsand, with their home field in the neighboring village of Laukhella. Storevatnet lake is located just northwest of the town.
