= Senja =

Second-largest island in Norway

Senja (Norwegian); Sážžá (Northern Sami)
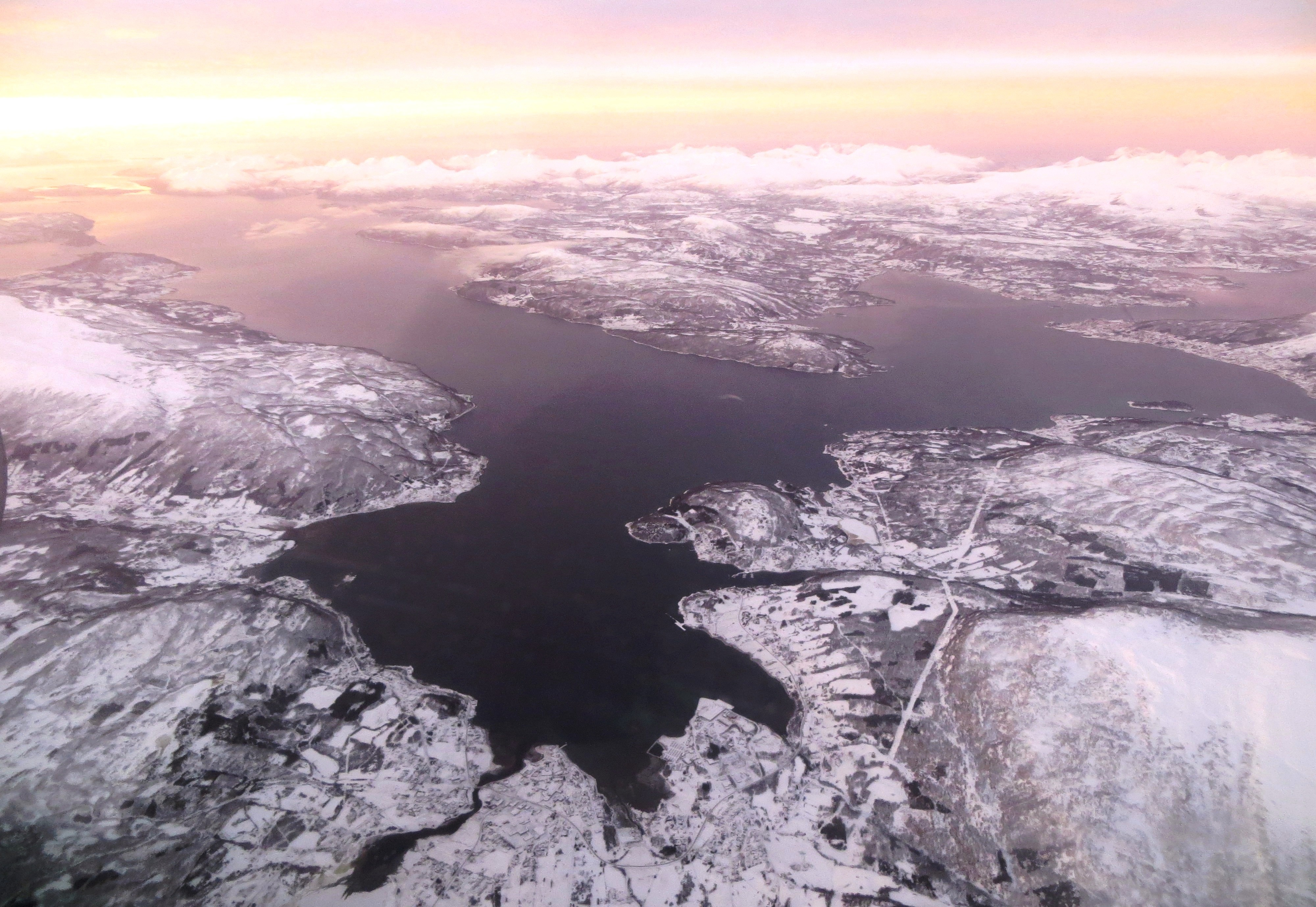
- View of the island towards the top of the picture
- Interactive map of: Senja (Norwegian); Sážžá (Northern Sami)

Geography
- Location: Troms, Norway
- Coordinates: 69.0806°N 16.8031°E
- Area: 1,586.3 km^{2} (612.5 sq mi)
- Highest elevation: 1,017 m (3337 ft)
- Highest point: Breidtinden

Administration
- Norway
- County: Troms
- Municipality: Senja Municipality
- Largest settlement: Silsand (pop. 1,583)

Demographics
- Population: 7,864 (2017)
- Pop. density: 4.96/km^{2} (12.85/sq mi)

Senja (Norwegian) or Sážžá (Northern Sami) is an island in Senja Municipality in Troms county, Norway in northern Europe. With an area of 1,586.3 square kilometres (612.5 sq mi), it is the second largest island in Norway (outside the Svalbard archipelago). It has a wild, mountainous outer (western) side facing the Atlantic, and a mild and lush inner (eastern) side. The island is located entirely within Senja Municipality, which was established on 1 January 2020. The island of Senja had 7,864 inhabitants as of 1 January 2017. Most of the residents live along the eastern coast of the island, with Silsand being the largest urban area on the island. The fishing village of Gryllefjord on the west coast has a summer-only ferry connection to the nearby island of Andøya: the Andenes–Gryllefjord Ferry.

The island sits northeast of the Vesterålen archipelago, surrounded by the Norwegian Sea to the northwest, the Malangen fjord to the northeast, the Gisundet strait to the east, the Solbergfjorden to the southeast, the Vågsfjorden to the south, and the Andfjorden to the west. Ånderdalen National Park is located in the southern part of the island.

== Etymology ==
The Old Norse form of the name is believed to have been Senja or perhaps Sændja. The meaning of the name is unknown, but it might be related to the verb sundra, which means to "tear" or "split apart", possibly because the west coast of the island is torn and split by numerous small fjords. It might also be derived from a Proto-Norse form of the word Sandijōn, meaning "(area) of sand" or "sandy island". The Northern Sámi name Sážžá is likely a loanword from Norwegian, from an earlier form *Sanja- or *Sandjan.

== Archaeology ==
In June 2025, archaeologists from the Arctic University Museum of Norway announced the discovery of a well-preserved Viking boat burial dating to around AD 900–950. The burial featured a small wooden boat measuring approximately 5.4 meters in length, laid just below ground level. Within, the remains of a woman were arranged with care, her body positioned on her side with knees bent, accompanied by a small dog at her feet.

== Geography ==
Senja from space

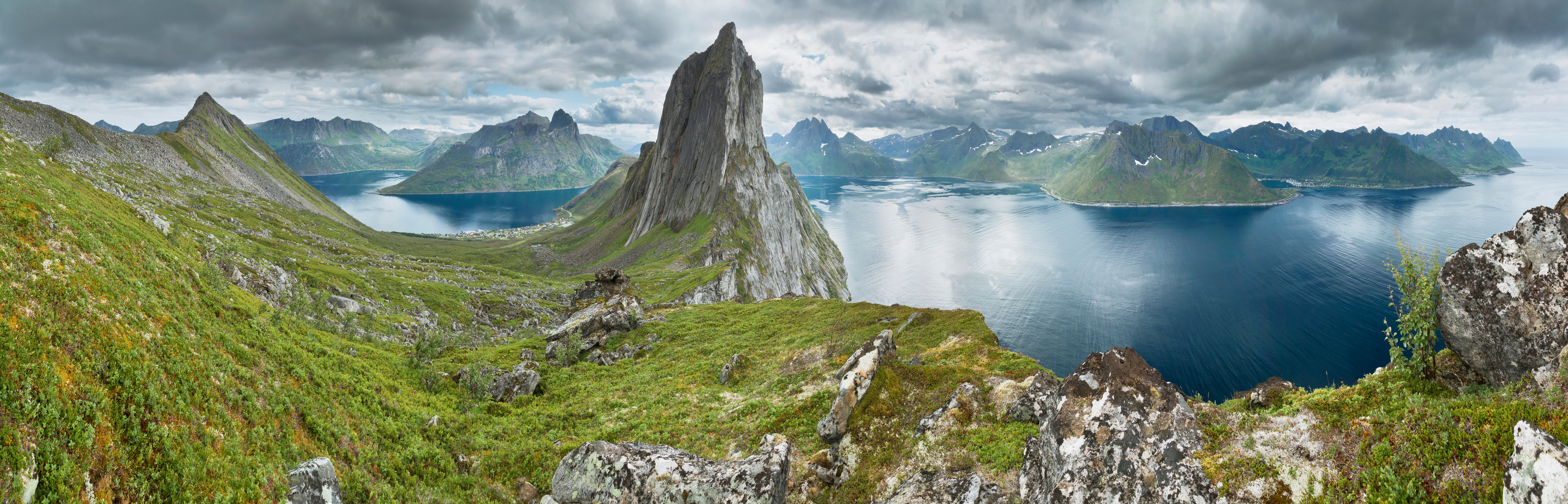
Mountain area at Senja in August.

The island of Senja is located along the Troms county coastline with Finnsnes as the closest town, located on the mainland, just east of the island. Senja is connected to the mainland by the Gisund Bridge. Historically, Senja was divided between Lenvik Municipality (part of which is on the mainland), Berg, Torsken Municipality, and Tranøy Municipality, but on 1 January 2020, the four municipalities were merged into Senja Municipality.

The northern coasts of Senja face the open sea, the western coast faces the islands of Andøya and Krøttøya, and the southern coast faces the islands of Andørja and Dyrøya, Tromwestern coast, steep and rugged mountains rise straight from the sea, with some fishing villages (like Gryllefjord and Husøy) tucked into the small lowland areas between the mountains and the sea. The eastern and southern parts of the island are milder, with rounder mountains, forests, rivers, and agricultural land.

Senja is often referred to as "Norway in miniature", as the island's diverse scenery reflects almost the entire span of Norwegian natural geography. Senja is known domestically for its scenery and is marketed as a tourist attraction.

=== Climate ===
Laukhella is near Silsand on Senja island, facing the mainland towards the east. The eastern part of the island is less windy, with warmer summers and colder winters than the west coast. The climate data from Hekkingen Lighthouse is more typical for the west coast, albeit the precipitation is higher in the very west.

Climate data for Laukhella, Senja 1991–2020 (3 m, extremes 1997–2011)
Month	Jan	Feb	Mar	Apr	May	Jun	Jul	Aug	Sep	Oct	Nov	Dec	Year
Record high °C (°F)	8.3 (46.9)	8.3 (46.9)	11.2 (52.2)	16.2 (61.2)	25.7 (78.3)	26.7 (80.1)	28.3 (82.9)	27.6 (81.7)	22.2 (72.0)	16.2 (61.2)	12.6 (54.7)	9.7 (49.5)	28.3 (82.9)
Daily mean °C (°F)	−3.9 (25.0)	−3.8 (25.2)	−2 (28)	1.8 (35.2)	6.4 (43.5)	10.6 (51.1)	13.5 (56.3)	12.5 (54.5)	8.4 (47.1)	3.3 (37.9)	−0.3 (31.5)	−2.4 (27.7)	3.7 (38.6)
Record low °C (°F)	−22.3 (−8.1)	−23.7 (−10.7)	−22 (−8)	−17.7 (0.1)	−6 (21)	0.4 (32.7)	2.4 (36.3)	−1.3 (29.7)	−5.3 (22.5)	−14.7 (5.5)	−16.5 (2.3)	−21.8 (−7.2)	−23.7 (−10.7)
Average precipitation mm (inches)	102 (4.0)	85 (3.3)	97 (3.8)	63 (2.5)	51 (2.0)	57 (2.2)	66 (2.6)	77 (3.0)	117 (4.6)	114 (4.5)	88 (3.5)	105 (4.1)	1,120 (44.1)
Source: Norwegian Meteorological Institute

Climate data for Hekkingen Lighthouse 1991–2020 (33 m)
Month	Jan	Feb	Mar	Apr	May	Jun	Jul	Aug	Sep	Oct	Nov	Dec	Year
Mean daily maximum °C (°F)	1.2 (34.2)	0.8 (33.4)	1.8 (35.2)	4.5 (40.1)	8.6 (47.5)	11.5 (52.7)	14.4 (57.9)	14.1 (57.4)	11.2 (52.2)	6.7 (44.1)	4 (39)	2.4 (36.3)	6.8 (44.2)
Daily mean °C (°F)	−1 (30)	−1.4 (29.5)	−0.2 (31.6)	2.4 (36.3)	6 (43)	9 (48)	11.8 (53.2)	11.7 (53.1)	9.1 (48.4)	4.9 (40.8)	2.1 (35.8)	0.3 (32.5)	4.6 (40.2)
Mean daily minimum °C (°F)	−2.7 (27.1)	−3 (27)	−1.9 (28.6)	0.5 (32.9)	4 (39)	7.3 (45.1)	9.9 (49.8)	10 (50)	7.5 (45.5)	3.5 (38.3)	0.6 (33.1)	−1.3 (29.7)	2.9 (37.2)
Average precipitation mm (inches)	100 (3.9)	71 (2.8)	77 (3.0)	51 (2.0)	45 (1.8)	43 (1.7)	63 (2.5)	87 (3.4)	111 (4.4)	110 (4.3)	90 (3.5)	83 (3.3)	931 (36.6)
Source 1: Norwegian Meteorological Institute
Source 2: Meteostat Hekkingen

== Economy ==
Naturally, the fishing industry is dominant on Senja, notably the Nergård Group at Senjahopen and Brødrene Karlsen at Husøy. Skaland has some graphite mining. Another important industry is ArtNord and Tromspotet at Silsand, which specializes in potato and potato products. Sollia has a stair factory and the world's northernmost fibreglass insulation factory, Nicopan AS, which has customers throughout Norway, and exports abroad.

== Transportation ==
The residents of Senja have the Gisund Bridge as a ferry-free road connection to the mainland across Gisundet to the town of Finnsnes. The town serves as a trading center for the entire Mid-Troms region, including the island of Senja. The island is also connected with the other towns in the county. At Lysnes on northern Senja is a fast boat connection with the city of Tromsø, a trip that takes about 50 minutes. From the villages of Flakstadvåg and Skrolsvik on the west and south sides of the island, there are also ferries to the town of Harstad to the south. During the summer there is a ferry between northern Senja and the island of Kvaløya, between southern Senja and Harstad, and between Gryllefjord and Andenes.

Senja has four main roads. The main road is Norwegian County Road 86 which crosses the Gisund Bridge from Finnsnes, Sørreisa, and Bardufoss. It extends across the island to Torsken and Gryllefjord. From Silsand, Norwegian County Road 861 goes north along Gisundet to Gibostad and northern Senja. Norwegian County Road 860 goes from Stonglandseidet to Silsand, Norwegian County Road 862 goes from Straumsbotn, via Senjahopen to Botnhamn.

== Governance ==
In March 2017, the Parliament of Norway voted to merge Berg, Torsken Municipality, Lenvik Municipality, and Tranøy Municipality. The new municipality was established on 1 January 2020 as Senja Municipality (Norwegian: Senja kommune). It is located in the traditional district of Hålogaland. The administrative centre of the municipality became the town of Finnsnes. The municipality includes all of the islands of Senja, the smaller surrounding islands, and part of the mainland between the Gisundet strait and the Malangen fjord.

== Attractions ==
Among the sights of the island are Ånderdalen National Park, with coastal pine forests and mountains, traditional fishing communities, and previously the Senja Troll, the world's largest troll statue (which burned down 28 March 2019). The southern part of the island is the site of a number of small museums documenting local history, notably the Halibut Museum ("Kveitmuseet") in Skrolsvik.

== In popular culture ==
The island of Senja is mentioned in David Armine Howarth's World War II book, and true story, We Die Alone: A WWII Epic of Escape and Endurance. It has a namesake island in the MMORPG Tibia.

The Norwegian musician Moddi comes from the island and his music is said to have been influenced by its beauty.

The Norwegian musician Biosphere lives in Senja (as of 2018–19) and his 2019 album The Senja Recordings, which was recorded in Senja, refers to several places in Senja (Bergsbotn, Steinfjord, etc.).

== Gallery ==
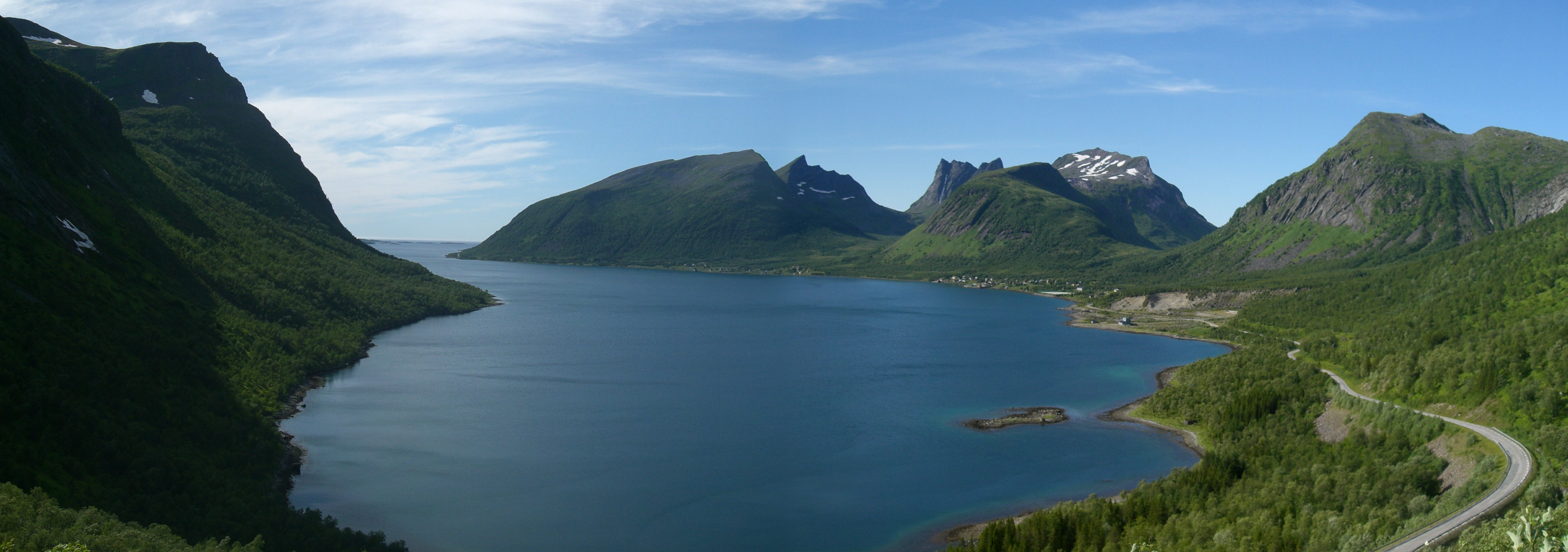
Bergsfjorden

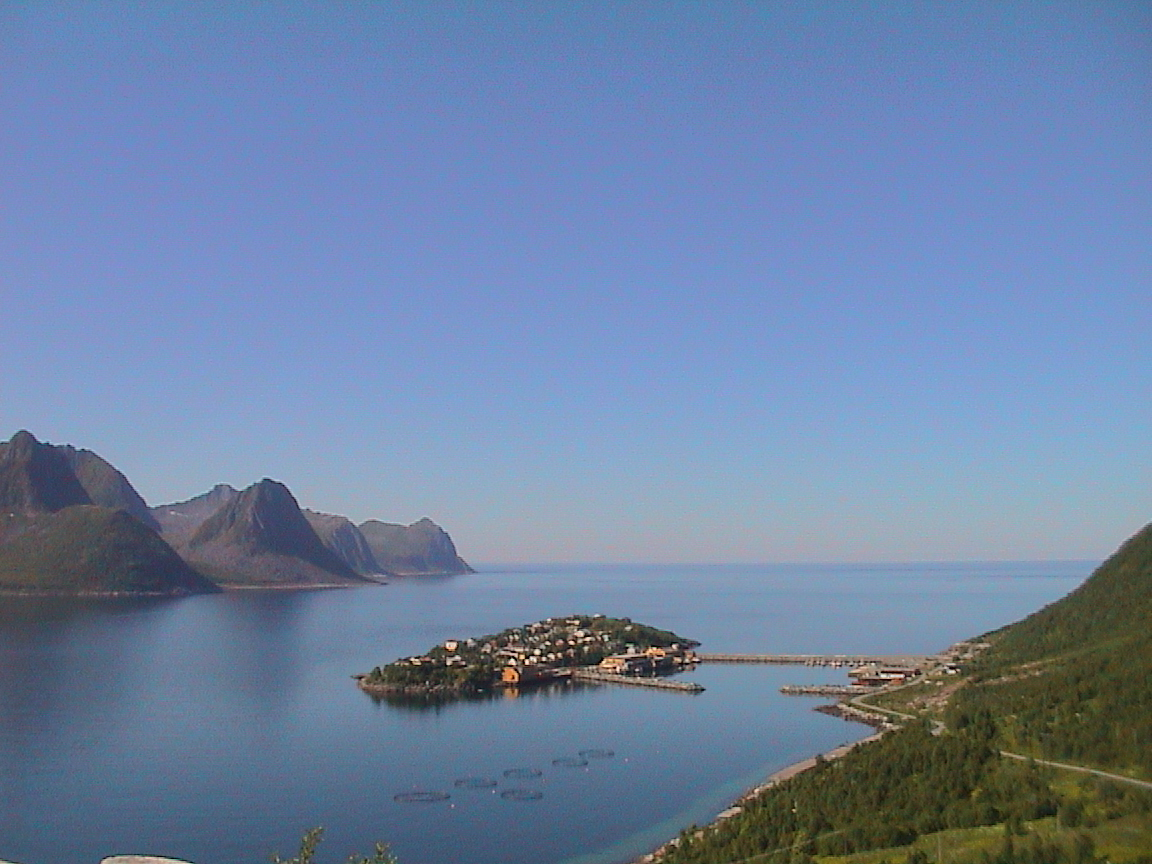
Husøy

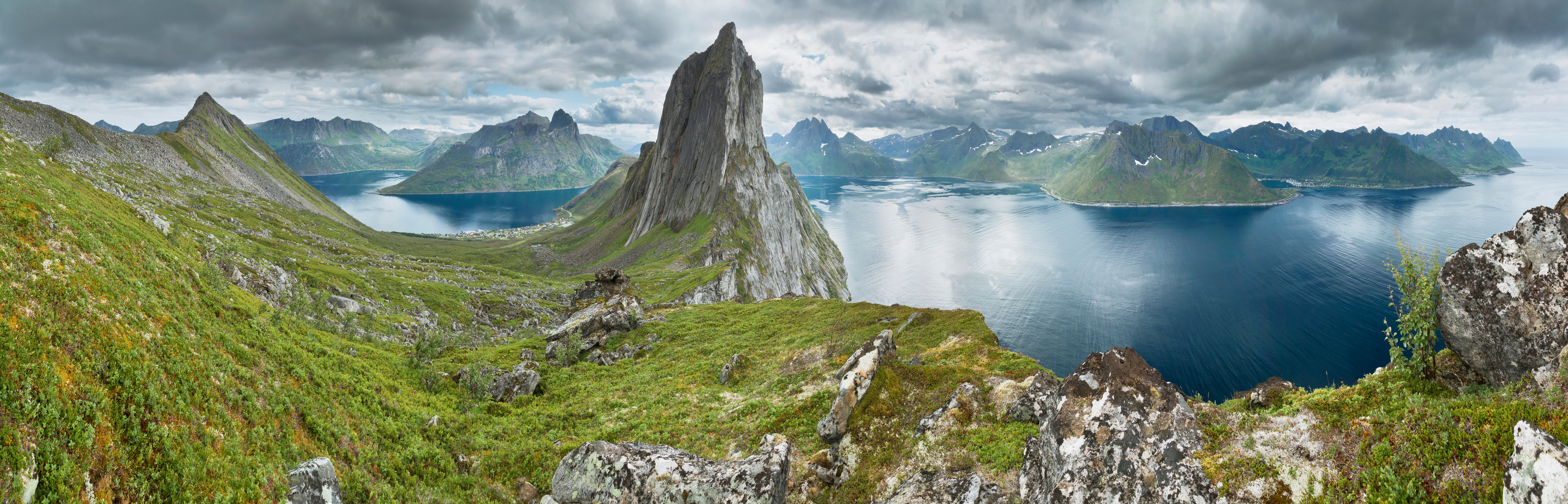
View from a ridge between Segla and Hesten

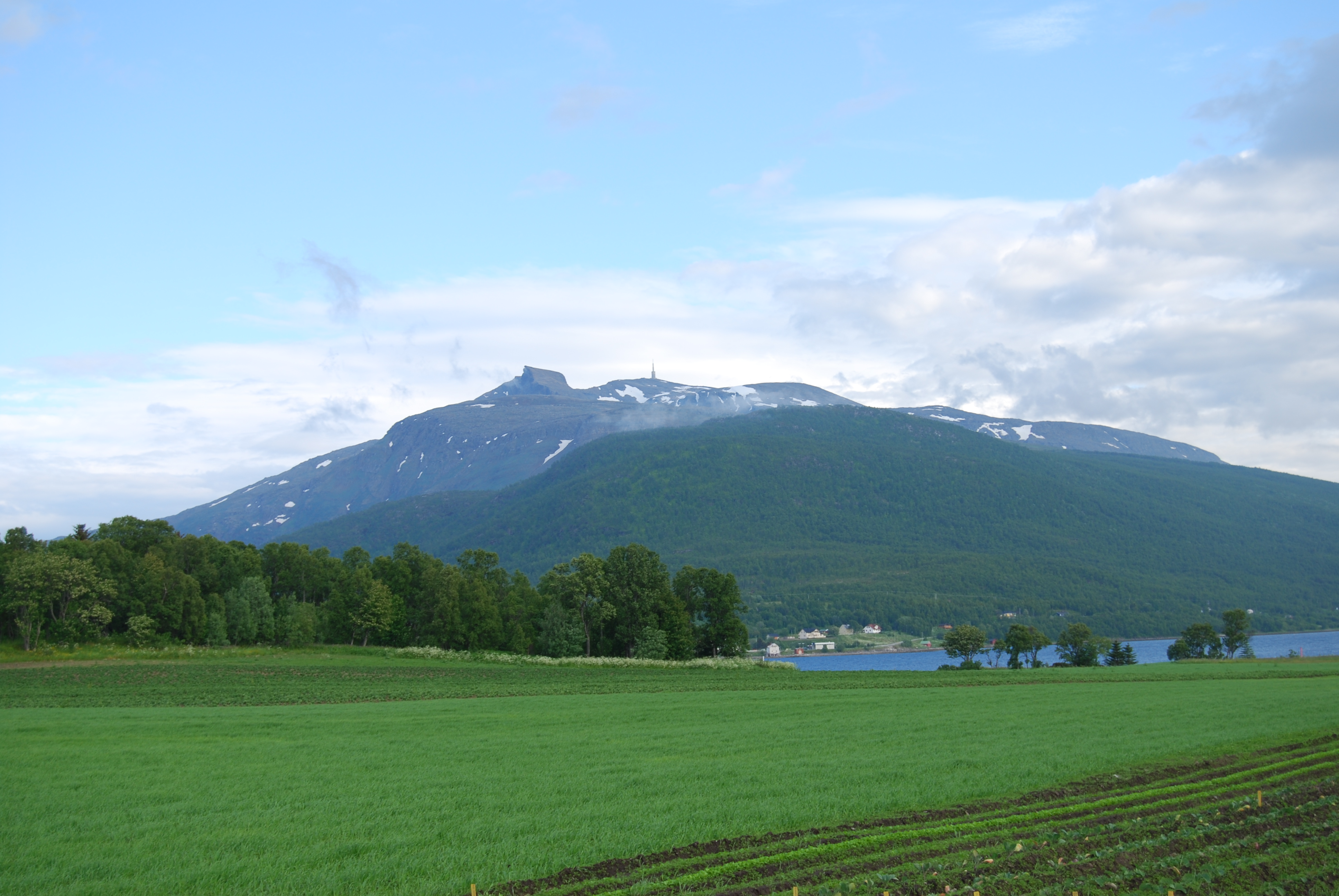
View from Gibostad towards Kistefjellet on the mainland

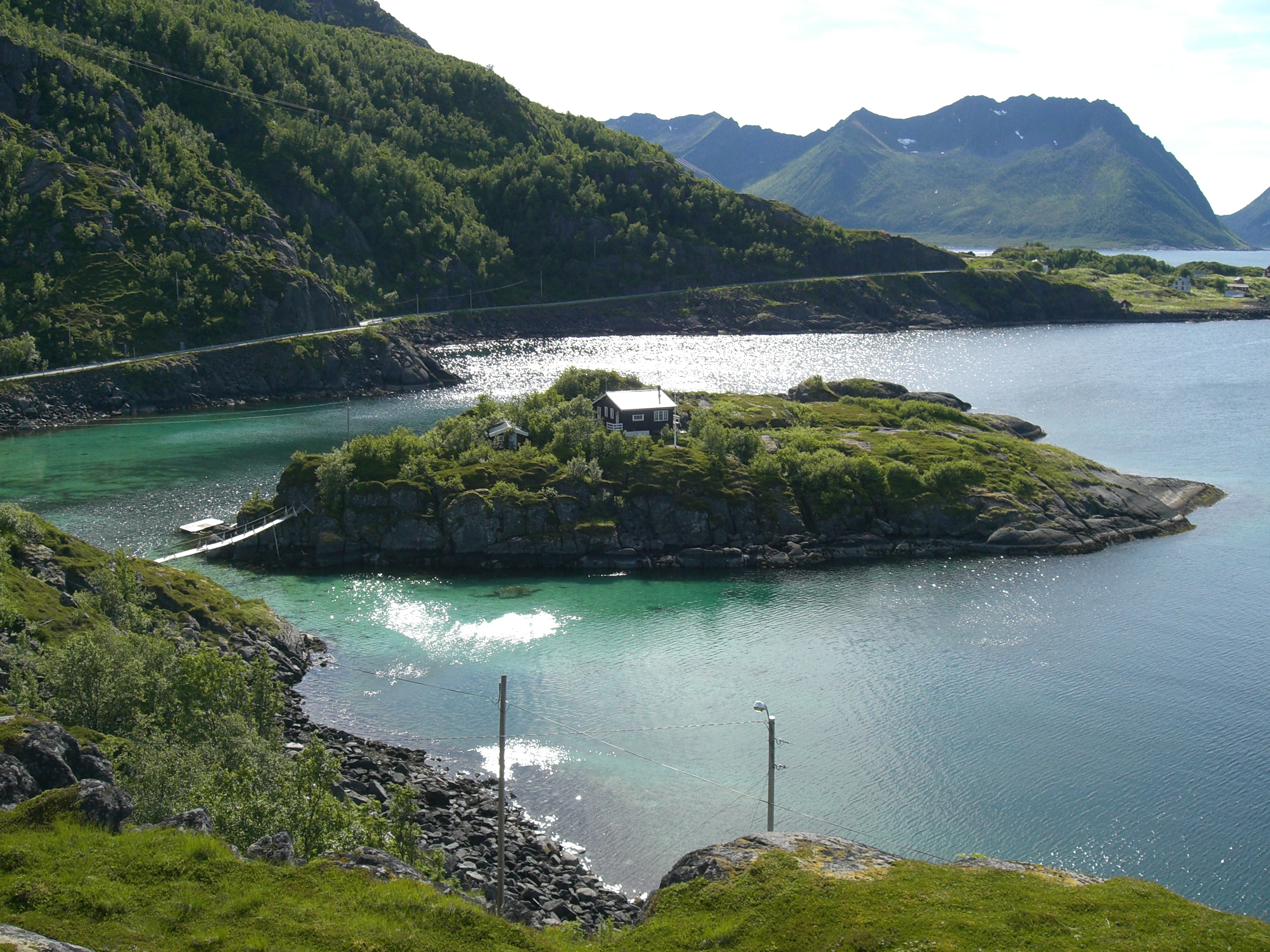
Sandvikholmen and shores near Hamn

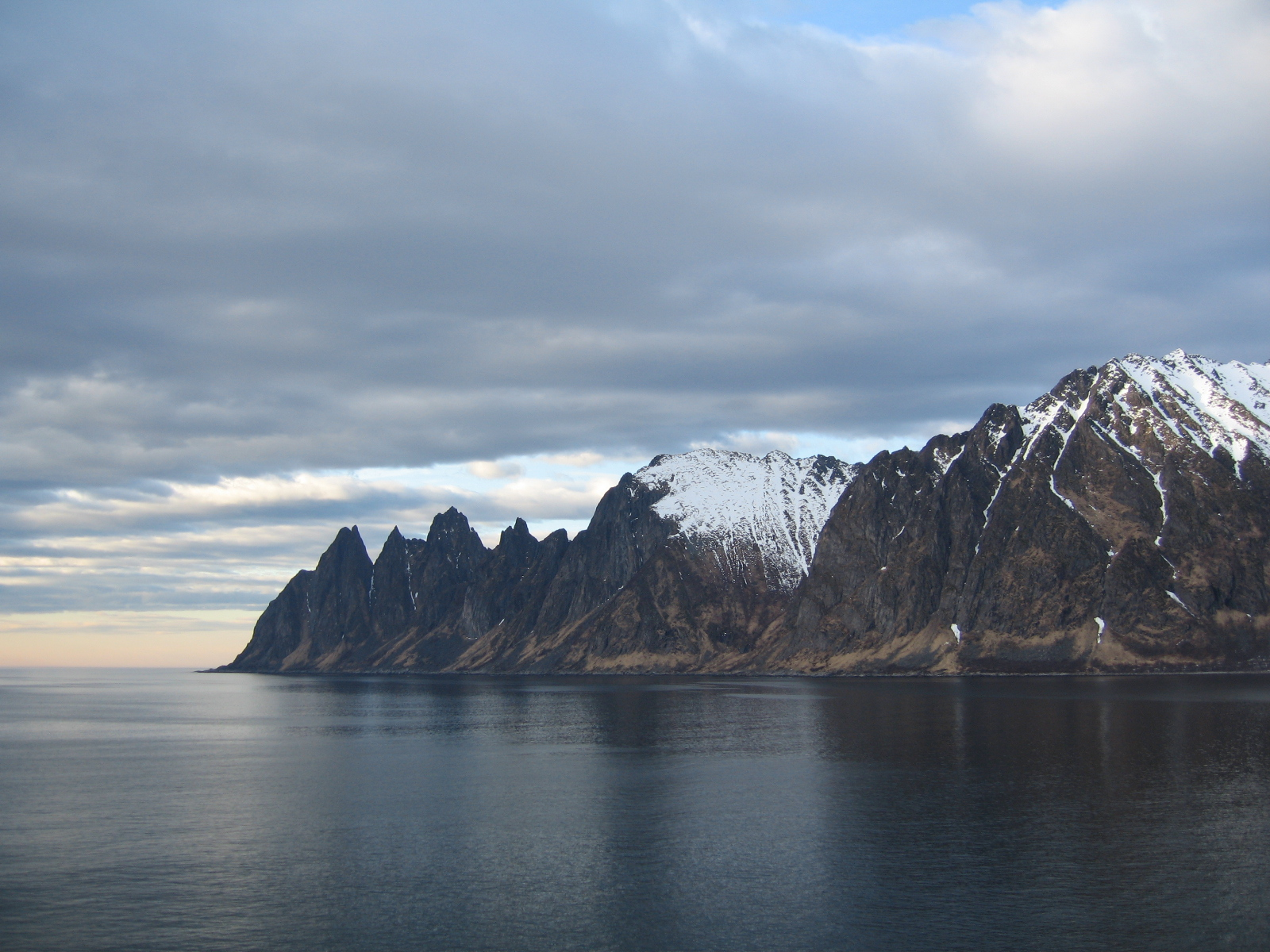
Ersfjorden and nearby mountains

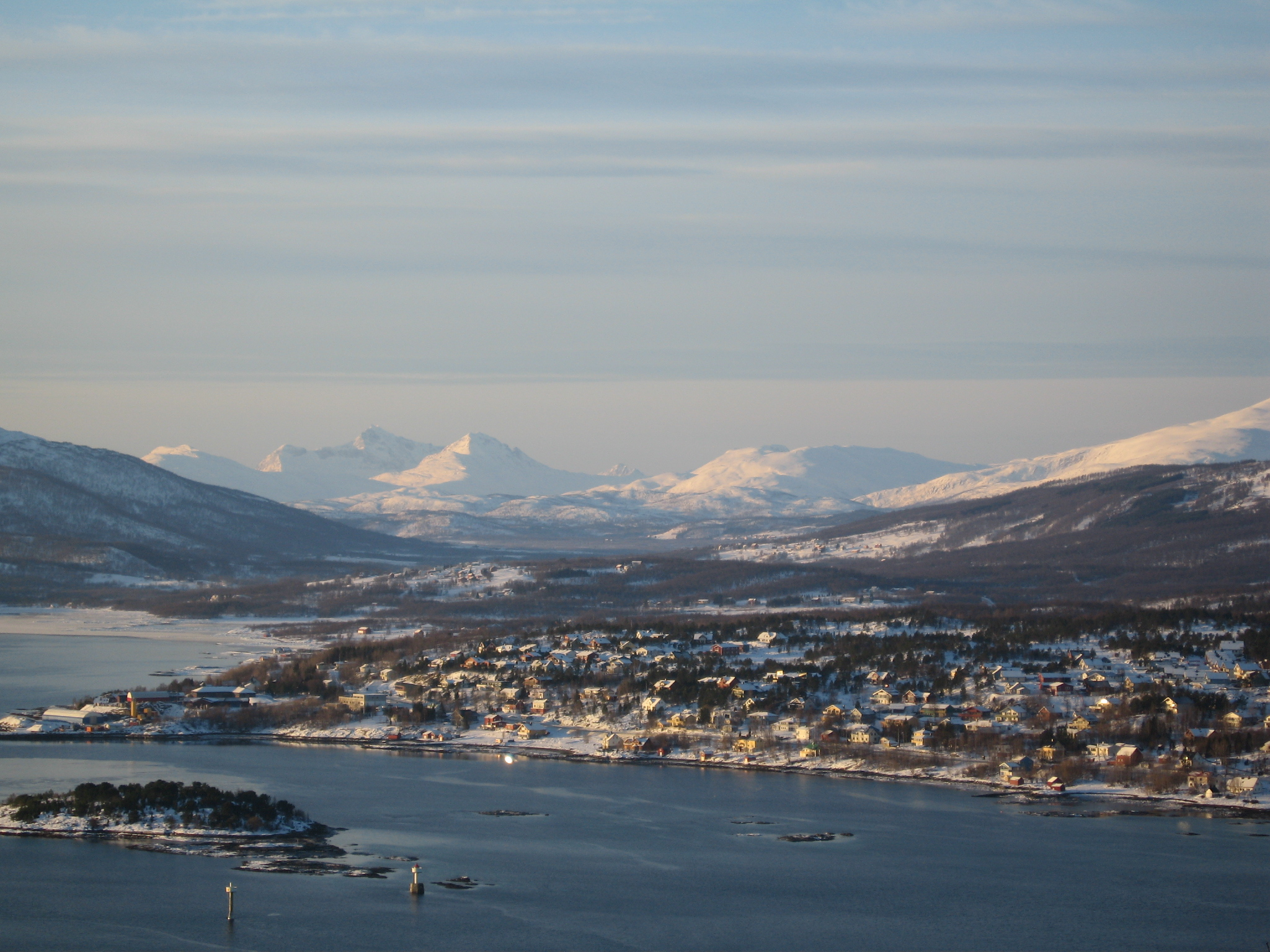
Silsand

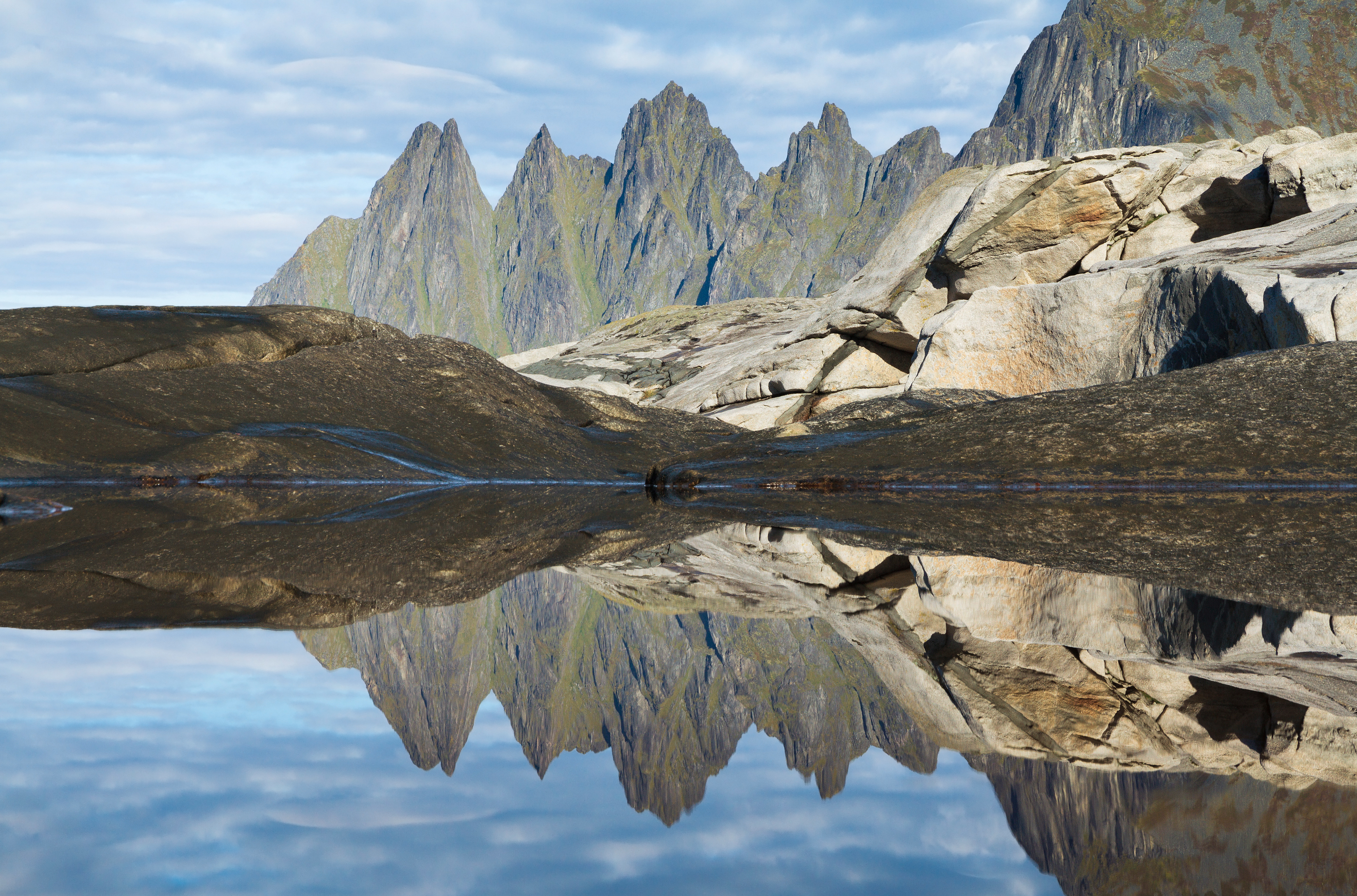
Okshornan peaks viewed from Tungeneset

== See also ==
- List of islands of Norway
