= List of villages in Troms =

This is a list of villages in Troms, a county in Norway. For other counties see the lists of villages in Norway. This list excludes cities located in Troms. For multi-lingual areas, the Sami and/or Kven names are also given. The villages that are the administrative centres of their municipalities are marked (†) and highlighted in blue.

Place	Coordinates	Postal code	Municipality
Aglapsvik	69°27′46″N 18°12′40″E	9300	Senja
Akkarvik	70°03′51″N 20°29′33″E	9190	Skjervøy
Alappmoen	68°59′46″N 19°01′52″E	9336	Målselv
Alteidet	70°01′44″N 22°05′40″E	9161	Kvænangen
Altvika	68°56′35″N 16°40′30″E	9425	Harstad
Andersdal	69°30′53″N 19°00′27″E	9020	Tromsø
Andselv	69°03′55″N 18°30′55″E	9325	Målselv
Andslimoen	69°05′26″N 18°34′56″E	9325	Målselv
Apaja	69°22′19″N 20°13′41″E	9143	Storfjord
Arnøyhamn	70°03′09″N 20°37′55″E	9192	Skjervøy
Aspelund	69°14′08″N 18°10′33″E	9300	Senja
Aun	68°52′53″N 16°20′26″E	9402	Harstad
Aursfjord	69°16′13″N 18°43′05″E	9050	Balsfjord
Aursfjordbotn	69°15′12″N 18°41′05″E	9322	Målselv
Aursfjordgård	69°18′12″N 18°39′14″E	9055	Balsfjord
Austnes	68°58′50″N 16°33′25″E	9426	Harstad
Badderen	69°50′43″N 22°01′34″E	9162	Kvænangen
Bakkeby	69°51′02″N 20°51′05″E	9153	Nordreisa
Bakkejorda	68°39′19″N 17°14′01″E	9446	Tjeldsund
Bakkejord	69°31′44″N 18°17′30″E	9106	Tromsø
Bardufoss	69°03′52″N 18°30′54″E	9325	Målselv
Bardujord	68°48′24″N 18°31′58″E	9360	Bardu
Beinsnes	69°37′12″N 19°50′34″E	9064	Lyngen
Bergsbotn	69°26′33″N 17°25′23″E	9385	Senja
Bessebostad	68°53′20″N 16°36′07″E	9420	Harstad
Birtavarre	69°29′39″N 20°50′00″E	9147	Kåfjord
Bjorelvnes	69°20′29″N 18°05′16″E	9300	Senja
Bjørnå	68°53′00″N 16°30′00″E	9420	Harstad
Bogen	68°39′41″N 15°53′08″E	8409	Kvæfjord
Bolla	68°50′07″N 17°04′13″E	9450	Ibestad
Boltåsen	68°32′03″N 16°41′33″E	9440	Tjeldsund
Bondjorda	69°19′01″N 18°02′55″E	9300	Senja
Bones	68°38′42″N 18°14′40″E	9360	Bardu
Borkenes (†)	68°46′26″N 16°10′26″E	9475	Kvæfjord
Botnhamn	69°30′26″N 17°54′10″E	9373	Senja
Brandvoll	68°49′47″N 18°10′31″E	9360	Bardu
Breidstrand	68°32′38″N 16°37′48″E	9440	Tjeldsund
Breivika	68°44′46″N 16°33′22″E	9415	Harstad
Breivikeidet	69°39′22″N 19°34′03″E	9020	Tromsø
Breivoll	68°45′35″N 17°08′54″E	9450	Ibestad
Bremnes	68°51′51″N 16°11′42″E	9475	Kvæfjord
Brensholmen	69°35′57″N 18°02′24″E	9118	Tromsø
Brygghaug	69°14′15″N 17°36′51″E	9304	Senja
Brøstadbotn (†)	69°05′19″N 17°41′41″E	9311	Dyrøy
Bukkskinn	69°21′28″N 18°06′30″E	9300	Senja
Burfjord (†)	69°56′16″N 22°03′07″E	9161	Kvænangen
Burøysund	70°13′39″N 19°43′44″E	9136	Karlsøy
Buvik	69°33′07″N 18°07′17″E	9106	Tromsø
Bø	68°34′06″N 16°37′30″E	9440	Tjeldsund
Dale	68°56′20″N 16°21′13″E	9423	Harstad
Dalen i Salangen	68°52′53″N 17°41′12″E	9350	Salangen
Djupvik	69°45′09″N 20°29′37″E	9146	Kåfjord
Djupvåg	69°10′12″N 18°06′57″E	9310	Sørreisa
Dyrøyhamn	69°00′43″N 17°26′06″E	9311	Dyrøy
Dåfjord	69°59′15″N 19°22′59″E	9130	Karlsøy
Eidet	69°19′14″N 18°33′53″E	9322	Målselv
Elsnes	69°20′12″N 20°03′03″E	9046	Storfjord
Elvebakken	68°41′50″N 16°55′47″E	9350	Tjeldsund
Elvenes	68°40′18″N 17°39′45″E	9470	Gratangen
Elvevoll	69°20′23″N 19°57′46″E	9046	Storfjord
Engenes	68°55′16″N 17°08′06″E	9455	Ibestad
Ersfjord	69°29′04″N 17°24′26″E	9386	Senja
Ersfjordbotn	69°41′30″N 18°36′55″E	9100	Tromsø
Ervika	68°49′21″N 16°28′58″E	9402	Harstad
Evenskjer (†)	68°35′05″N 16°34′31″E	9440	Tjeldsund
Espejord	69°04′48″N 17°32′20″E	9311	Dyrøy
Espenes	69°06′45″N 17°45′02″E	9311	Dyrøy
Fagerli	69°17′38″N 17°46′35″E	9300	Senja
Fagernes	69°33′40″N 19°11′04″E	9027	Tromsø
Fauskevåg	68°40′02″N 16°35′16″E	9419	Harstad
Fenes	68°55′54″N 16°38′17″E	9425	Harstad
Finnfjordbotn; Vuotnabahta (Northern Sami)	69°14′04″N 18°05′38″E	9300	Senja
Finnfjordeidet	69°15′06″N 18°10′08″E	9300	Senja
Finnfjord	69°13′00″N 18°05′10″E	9300	Senja
Finnkroken	69°50′06″N 19°25′59″E	9132	Karlsøy
Finnland	69°05′40″N 17°39′51″E	9311	Dyrøy
Finnsæter	69°24′47″N 17°15′17″E	9385	Senja
Fiskefjorden	68°33′27″N 16°05′13″E	9436	Tjeldsund
Fjelldal	68°33′21″N 16°31′34″E	9441	Tjeldsund
Fjordbotn	68°40′15″N 17°42′57″E	9470	Gratangen
Fjordbotnmarka; Skuhppi (Northern Sami)	68°39′48″N 17°45′43″E	9470	Gratangen
Fjordgård	69°30′28″N 17°37′43″E	9388	Senja
Flakstadvåg	69°11′30″N 17°03′18″E	9393	Senja
Flesnes	68°40′17″N 15°54′46″E	8409	Kvæfjord
Foldvik	68°41′33″N 17°25′30″E	9470	Gratangen
Fornes	68°52′06″N 17°28′14″E	9453	Ibestad
Forså	68°44′37″N 16°58′58″E	9450	Ibestad
Fossmoen	69°02′44″N 18°35′38″E	9325	Målselv
Furuflaten; Vuošvággi (Northern Sami)	69°26′29″N 20°09′14″E	9062	Lyngen
Furøy	69°09′44″N 18°05′31″E	9310	Sørreisa
Futrikelv	69°47′30″N 19°01′35″E	9100	Tromsø
Gammnes	69°54′33″N 19°28′50″E	9130	Karlsøy
Gausvik	68°36′51″N 16°31′00″E	9430	Harstad
Gibostad	69°21′18″N 18°04′31″E	9372	Senja
Gottersjord	69°09′39″N 18°07′12″E	9310	Sørreisa
Grasmyrskogen	69°17′39″N 17°47′17″E	9303	Senja
Grovfjord/Grov	68°40′51″N 17°07′32″E	9446	Tjeldsund
Grøtfjord	69°46′42″N 18°32′39″E	9107	Tromsø
Grunnfarnes	69°18′09″N 16°58′38″E	9395	Senja
Grunnfjorden	69°59′32″N 19°33′37″E	9130	Karlsøy
Grunnreisa	69°10′43″N 18°04′15″E	9310	Sørreisa
Grunnvåg	69°24′05″N 18°02′34″E	9372	Senja
Gryllefjord (†)	69°21′46″N 17°03′10″E	9380	Senja
Grønjord	69°24′48″N 18°21′16″E	9302	Senja
Grøtavær	68°57′58″N 16°16′41″E	9423	Harstad
Grøtnesdalen	69°51′19″N 19°38′18″E	9132	Tromsø
Gåra	68°45′40″N 16°14′33″E	9475	Kvæfjord
Hamn	69°25′02″N 17°09′44″E	9385	Senja
Hamneidet	69°55′44″N 20°57′32″E	9181	Nordreisa
Hamnnes; Gárgu (Northern Sami)	69°47′18″N 20°34′01″E	9159	Nordreisa
Hamnvik (†)	68°46′41″N 17°10′28″E	9450	Ibestad
Hamnvåg	69°19′19″N 18°46′41″E	9055	Balsfjord
Hamre	70°07′40″N 19°42′19″E	9136	Karlsøy
Hansnes (†)	69°58′00″N 19°36′00″E	9130	Karlsøy
Hatteng (†)	69°16′14″N 19°57′33″E	9046	Storfjord
Heggelia	69°02′40″N 18°30′37″E	9321	Målselv
Helgøy	70°06′56″N 19°22′11″E	9130	Karlsøy
Hella	69°33′30″N 18°43′36″E	9100	Tromsø
Hemmestad	68°43′56″N 16°03′27″E	9475	Kvæfjord
Hemmingsjord	69°11′49″N 18°04′02″E	9310	Sørreisa
Hesjeberg	68°43′47″N 17°28′11″E	9470	Gratangen
Hesjevika	68°45′41″N 17°48′24″E	9465	Lavangen
Hessfjord	69°56′58″N 19°28′11″E	9130	Karlsøy
Hilleshamn	68°43′59″N 17°16′12″E	9470	Gratangen
Hol i Tjeldsund	68°32′56″N 16°23′32″E	9444	Tjeldsund
Holm	69°02′23″N 17°30′39″E	9311	Dyrøy
Holt	69°01′01″N 19°24′48″E	9336	Målselv
Horsnes	69°19′30″N 20°01′02″E	9046	Storfjord
Hov	68°33′17″N 16°20′55″E	9444	Tjeldsund
Hundbergan	69°32′57″N 19°01′43″E	9020	Tromsø
Hundstrand	69°02′40″N 17°36′52″E	9311	Dyrøy
Hundtorp	68°50′21″N 18°23′52″E	9360	Bardu
Hundstad	68°44′56″N 16°09′48″E	9475	Kvæfjord
Husøy i Senja	69°32′32″N 17°39′45″E	9389	Senja
Håkavika	68°52′23″N 17°36′10″E	9350	Salangen
Håkstad	68°39′29″N 18°12′29″E	9360	Bardu
Håkøybotn	69°37′51″N 18°43′36″E	9100	Tromsø
Indre Berg	69°33′38″N 18°57′03″E	9020	Tromsø
Indre Årnes	69°24′39″N 17°59′51″E	9372	Senja
Innset	68°39′32″N 18°48′36″E	9360	Bardu
Jektevika	68°53′30″N 17°25′22″E	9453	Ibestad
Jægervatn	69°43′52″N 19°51′16″E	9064	Lyngen
Jøkelfjord	70°03′37″N 21°52′10″E	9163	Kvænangen
Jøvik	69°36′15″N 19°49′02″E	9043	Tromsø
Kaldfarnes	69°17′02″N 17°01′40″E	9395	Senja
Kaldfjord	69°40′45″N 18°44′20″E	9100	Tromsø
Kaldsletta	69°37′00″N 18°57′00″E	9020	Tromsø
Kammen	70°04′48″N 19°42′28″E	9136	Karlsøy
Kampevoll	69°12′09″N 17°30′39″E	9304	Senja
Kantornes	69°22′38″N 19°17′11″E	9042	Balsfjord
Karlstad	69°12′48″N 18°28′12″E	9322	Målselv
Karlsøy	70°00′09″N 19°53′21″E	9138	Karlsøy
Karnes	69°33′39″N 20°13′09″E	9060	Lyngen
Kasfjord	68°50′03″N 16°21′18″E	9402	Harstad
Keianes	69°16′18″N 18°41′46″E	9322	Målselv
Keiprød	68°46′53″N 17°38′01″E	9465	Lavangen
Kilbotn	68°43′03″N 16°32′00″E	9415	Harstad
Kirkesjorda	68°53′21″N 19°03′26″E	9336	Målselv
Kjerstad	68°27′01″N 16°07′29″E	9444	Tjeldsund
Kjosen	69°34′59″N 20°09′16″E	9060	Lyngen
Kjosen	69°41′11″N 18°44′40″E	9100	Tromsø
Kjækan	69°46′44″N 22°05′00″E	9162	Kvænangen
Kjøtta	68°52′24″N 16°41′44″E	9424	Harstad
Klåpen	68°55′37″N 17°15′54″E	9455	Ibestad
Kongsvika	68°33′58″N 16°15′13″E	9436	Tjeldsund
Koppangen; Gohppi (Northern Sami)	69°40′45″N 20°15′45″E	9060	Lyngen
Kraksletta	69°31′20″N 18°51′57″E	9055	Tromsø
Kristofferjorda	69°32′32″N 19°04′00″E	9020	Tromsø
Kristoffervalen	70°07′50″N 19°59′29″E	9135	Karlsøy
Kroken	69°41′02″N 19°04′10″E	9022	Tromsø
Kråkrøhamn	68°50′03″N 17°22′45″E	9453	Ibestad
Kvalvik	69°30′09″N 20°12′15″E	9062	Lyngen
Kvaløysletta	69°41′44″N 18°52′58″E	9100	Tromsø
Kvaløyvågen	69°51′08″N 18°49′10″E	9100	Tromsø
Kvannåsen	69°18′35″N 17°53′04″E	9303	Senja
Kvænangsbotn	69°43′53″N 22°04′45″E	9162	Kvænangen
Kårvik	69°52′00″N 18°56′00″E	9131	Tromsø
Kårvikhamn	69°23′38″N 18°10′53″E	9300	Senja
Laberg	68°40′33″N 17°30′25″E	9470	Gratangen
Laberg	68°51′40″N 17°49′00″E	9465	Salangen
Labukta	69°27′06″N 18°59′13″E	9042	Balsfjord
Lakselvbukt	69°25′59″N 19°38′49″E	9042	Tromsø
Laksvatn	69°22′33″N 19°22′25″E	9042	Balsfjord
Langhamn	69°03′46″N 17°32′37″E	9311	Dyrøy
Langnes	69°19′05″N 18°13′34″E	9302	Senja
Langvassbukta	68°37′04″N 15°45′37″E	8409	Kvæfjord
Larseng	69°34′20″N 18°46′25″E	9100	Tromsø
Lattervika	69°47′04″N 19°54′42″E	9064	Lyngen
Laukhella	69°15′10″N 17°57′16″E	9303	Senja
Lauksletta	70°08′17″N 20°45′51″E	9194	Skjervøy
Lauksletta	69°33′33″N 19°05′35″E	9106	Tromsø
Lauksundskaret	70°04′43″N 20°46′34″E	9194	Skjervøy
Laukvik	69°33′37″N 17°53′56″E	9373	Senja
Laukvika	69°50′04″N 18°41′03″E	9120	Tromsø
Laupstad	68°52′07″N 17°08′29″E	9454	Ibestad
Lavangen	68°31′59″N 16°37′21″E	9440	Tjeldsund
Lavangnes	68°49′46″N 17°29′41″E	9350	Salangen
Lavik	68°44′38″N 17°25′59″E	9470	Gratangen
Leiknes	69°18′30″N 18°00′15″E	9300	Senja
Lenangsøyra	69°48′56″N 19°58′48″E	9064	Lyngen
Liland	69°36′18″N 21°15′11″E	9151	Nordreisa
Linberget	69°20′41″N 18°17′03″E	9302	Senja
Lundenes	68°52′48″N 16°34′12″E	9420	Harstad
Lyngseidet (†)	69°34′34″N 20°13′07″E	9060	Lyngen
Lyngspollen	69°29′04″N 20°10′44″E	9062	Lyngen
Løksa	68°55′39″N 17°38′57″E	9350	Salangen
Løksebotn	68°56′10″N 17°42′59″E	9350	Salangen
Løksfjord	70°01′48″N 18°43′13″E	9140	Tromsø
Løkvollen	69°32′28″N 20°33′03″E	9144	Kåfjord
Låternes	68°45′44″N 17°45′55″E	9465	Lavangen
Magesås	68°55′07″N 17°43′39″E	9350	Salangen
Malangseidet	69°23′19″N 18°59′01″E	9054	Balsfjord
Manndalen; Olmmáivággi (Northern Sami)	69°31′23″N 20°32′19″E	9144	Kåfjord
Medby	69°16′53″N 17°03′32″E	9395	Senja
Mefjordbotn	69°28′12″N 17°41′06″E	9386	Senja
Mefjordvær	69°31′07″N 17°26′18″E	9386	Senja
Melen	68°53′32″N 17°48′18″E	9350	Salangen
Meløyvær	69°04′22″N 16°30′16″E	9427	Harstad
Mestervik	69°19′40″N 18°55′28″E	9055	Balsfjord
Middagsbukta	69°20′38″N 19°07′09″E	9050	Balsfjord
Midtli	68°50′39″N 18°15′21″E	9360	Bardu
Mikkelbostad	68°59′42″N 17°24′15″E	9311	Dyrøy
Mikkelvik	70°03′59″N 19°02′37″E	9130	Karlsøy
Mjelde	69°32′27″N 18°26′10″E	9106	Tromsø
Mjølvik	70°01′58″N 18°33′34″E	9141	Tromsø
Moelva	68°34′17″N 15°49′40″E	8409	Kvæfjord
Moen (†)	69°07′49″N 18°36′44″E	9321	Målselv
Mortenshals	69°24′00″N 18°35′45″E	9056	Balsfjord
Movik	69°42′41″N 19°05′33″E	9022	Tromsø
Myklebostad	68°25′34″N 16°20′17″E	9443	Tjeldsund
Myrlandshaugen	68°46′24″N 17°16′43″E	9470	Gratangen
Målsnes	69°19′31″N 18°32′20″E	9322	Målselv
Nergården	68°59′48″N 16°32′00″E	9426	Harstad
Nergårdshamn	68°59′55″N 16°34′19″E	9426	Harstad
Nikkeby	70°04′02″N 20°49′50″E	9193	Skjervøy
Nord-Lenangen	69°55′18″N 20°09′38″E	9068	Lyngen
Nordbotn	69°39′16″N 18°44′38″E	9027	Tromsø
Nordbynes	69°19′55″N 18°49′15″E	9055	Balsfjord
Nordeidet	69°55′22″N 19°46′54″E	9132	Karlsøy
Nordfjordbotn	69°17′14″N 19°00′20″E	9055	Balsfjord
Nordkjosbotn; Gárgán (Northern Sami)	69°13′02″N 19°33′29″E	9040	Balsfjord
Nordkjosbotn	69°47′36″N 21°03′02″E	9151	Nordreisa
Nordmannvik	69°40′42″N 20°30′06″E	9146	Kåfjord
Nordvika	68°41′52″N 16°33′55″E	9419	Harstad
Nygårdstranda	69°55′13″N 20°09′50″E	9068	Lyngen
Oksfjordhamn	69°54′32″N 21°19′44″E	9151	Nordreisa
Olderbakken	69°34′54″N 19°45′18″E	9043	Tromsø
Olderdalen (†)	69°36′14″N 20°31′57″E	9146	Kåfjord
Olderfjord	70°10′28″N 21°28′56″E	9184	Kvænangen
Oldervik	69°45′24″N 19°40′33″E	9034	Tromsø
Oldervika	68°29′00″N 16°31′52″E	9442	Tjeldsund
Olsborg	69°08′40″N 18°35′37″E	9321	Målselv
Oteren; Čávkkus (Northern Sami)	69°15′19″N 19°53′02″E	9046	Storfjord
Otterå	68°51′59″N 17°47′08″E	9350	Salangen
Polleidet; Taipale (Kven)	69°29′29″N 20°11′49″E	9062	Lyngen
Rabbåsen	69°04′38″N 18°11′41″E	9310	Sørreisa
Ramfjordnes	69°31′48″N 19°00′29″E	9020	Tromsø
Ramsund	68°29′33″N 16°31′12″E	9442	Tjeldsund
Rasteby	69°23′35″N 20°07′24″E	9046	Storfjord
Rebbenes	70°03′08″N 18°55′50″E	9140	Karlsøy
Reinelv	69°12′25″N 18°15′02″E	9310	Sørreisa
Reinfjord	70°06′06″N 21°35′58″E	9184	Kvænangen
Rekvik	69°44′11″N 18°19′32″E	9107	Tromsø
Renså	68°41′10″N 16°54′46″E	9445	Tjeldsund
Revsnes	68°40′44″N 16°02′54″E	9475	Kvæfjord
Rollnes; Nuorta-Rállegeahci (Northern Sami)	68°51′43″N 17°02′33″E	9450	Ibestad
Rornes	69°33′17″N 19°43′22″E	9043	Tromsø
Rossfjordstraumen	69°21′47″N 18°18′49″E	9302	Senja
Rossvoll	69°11′27″N 18°29′24″E	9322	Målselv
Rotsund	69°46′39″N 20°35′22″E	9153	Nordreisa
Rottenvik	69°35′28″N 20°16′37″E	9060	Lyngen
Rotvika	68°53′37″N 17°40′52″E	9350	Salangen
Rubbestad	69°09′52″N 17°49′08″E	9304	Senja
Rundhaug	69°01′12″N 18°53′53″E	9336	Målselv
Rød	68°47′27″N 17°45′50″E	9465	Lavangen
Rødsand	69°08′10″N 17°01′25″E	9392	Senja
Røkenes	68°46′26″N 17°44′20″E	9465	Lavangen
Røykeneset; Ruikat (Northern Sami); Ruikkatanniemi (Kven)	69°24′55″N 20°15′29″E	9143	Storfjord
Røyrbakken	68°57′57″N 17°45′28″E	9350	Salangen
Samuelsberg	69°33′5″N 20°32′0″E	9144	Kåfjord
Sand	69°23′28″N 18°36′30″E	9056	Balsfjord
Sandemarka; Sáttiidvuopmi (Northern Sami)	68°38′57″N 16°51′00″E	9445	Tjeldsund
Sandneshamn	69°37′48″N 18°10′10″E	9100	Tromsø
Sandstrand	68°40′41″N 16°47′11″E	9445	Tjeldsund
Sandsøy	68°57′09″N 16°39′29″E	9425	Harstad
Sandtorg	68°34′11″N 16°31′18″E	9430	Harstad
Sandøra	69°19′16″N 19°57′27″E	9046	Storfjord
Sandøyra	69°20′36″N 19°15′59″E	9050	Balsfjord
Sappen	69°33′33″N 21°17′53″E	9151	Nordreisa
Seglvik	70°12′17″N 21°13′16″E	9182	Kvænangen
Sekkemo	69°50′14″N 21°56′57″E	9161	Kvænangen
Seljelvnes	69°16′05″N 19°24′48″E	9040	Balsfjord
Seljeskogen	68°54′25″N 17°51′56″E	9350	Salangen
Selnes	68°48′49″N 17°25′06″E	9470	Gratangen
Senjahopen	69°29′46″N 17°29′00″E	9386	Senja
Sessøya	69°44′00″N 18°14′40″E	9107	Tromsø
Setermoen (†)	68°51′39″N 18°20′54″E	9360	Bardu
Sifjord	69°17′07″N 17°08′51″E	9395	Senja
Silsand	69°14′19″N 17°56′20″E	9303	Senja
Sjursnes	69°32′17″N 19°38′20″E	9030	Tromsø
Sjøvassbotn	69°23′34″N 19°26′03″E	9042	Tromsø
Sjøvegan (†)	68°52′21″N 17°50′50″E	9350	Salangen
Skaland (†)	69°26′40″N 17°17′53″E	9385	Senja
Skarmunken; Skárramohkki (Northern Sami)	69°36′32″N 19°42′49″E	9030	Tromsø
Skarsfjord	69°58′02″N 18°50′52″E	9130	Tromsø
Skatvik	69°09′42″N 17°36′07″E	9304	Senja
Skibotn; Ivgobahta (Northern Sami)	69°23′27″N 20°16′02″E	9143	Storfjord
Skittenelv	69°46′36″N 19°23′49″E	9022	Tromsø
Skjelnan	69°41′55″N 19°05′02″E	9022	Tromsø
Skjervøy (†)	70°01′52″N 20°58′17″E	9180	Skjervøy
Skjold/Øverbygd	69°01′27″N 19°17′45″E	9334	Målselv
Skogen	69°14′05″N 18°03′30″E	9300	Senja
Skognes	69°19′26″N 17°54′03″E	9372	Senja
Skogvika	70°00′44″N 18°44′29″E	9140	Tromsø
Skrollsvika	69°04′06″N 16°50′23″E	9392	Senja
Skulsfjord	69°48′03″N 18°45′29″E	9103	Tromsø
Skøelva	69°07′54″N 18°03′01″E	9310	Sørreisa
Skårvika	68°53′26″N 17°48′10″E	9350	Salangen
Sletta	69°20′37″N 19°10′14″E	9050	Balsfjord
Slettmo	69°19′01″N 19°25′02″E	9042	Balsfjord
Slettnes	70°10′38″N 19°54′20″E	9135	Karlsøy
Slåttnes	69°34′55″N 18°47′26″E	9100	Tromsø
Smørsgård	69°08′49″N 18°03′22″E	9310	Sørreisa
Snarby	69°47′57″N 19°32′34″E	9022	Tromsø
Solli	69°11′59″N 17°47′46″E	9304	Senja
Soløy	68°46′33″N 17°47′57″E	9465	Lavangen
Sommarsetet	68°52′10″N 17°44′15″E	9350	Salangen
Sommarøy	69°37′59″N 18°05′10″E	9110	Tromsø
Spildra	69°59′46″N 21°40′55″E	9185	Kvænangen
Stakkvik	69°57′34″N 19°41′14″E	9132	Karlsøy
Steinfjord	69°27′38″N 17°21′08″E	9385	Senja
Steinnes	70°02′40″N 19°16′35″E	9130	Karlsøy
Steinsland	68°36′56″N 16°34′48″E	9440	Tjeldsund
Stigen	69°34′44″N 20°14′03″E	9060	Lyngen
Stonglandseidet	69°05′07″N 17°10′20″E	9392	Senja
Storbukta	69°25′51″N 19°03′26″E	9042	Balsfjord
Storeng; Stuoragieddi (Northern Sami)	70°00′29″N 22°01′25″E	9161	Kvænangen
Storjorda	68°40′23″N 16°20′59″E	9475	Kvæfjord
Storneset	69°27′47″N 18°58′17″E	9042	Balsfjord
Storslett (†)	69°46′04″N 21°01′28″E	9151	Nordreisa
Storsteinnes	69°36′46″N 19°52′49″E	9060	Lyngen
Storsteinnes (†)	69°14′26″N 19°14′03″E	9050	Balsfjord
Storvatnet	68°39′11″N 16°25′40″E	9419	Harstad
Straumen	68°54′45″N 17°11′42″E	9455	Ibestad
Straumen	68°44′10″N 16°14′39″E	9475	Kvæfjord
Straumen	69°53′27″N 20°09′41″E	9068	Lyngen
Straumfjordnes	69°52′34″N 21°12′16″E	9151	Nordreisa
Straumsbukta	69°34′18″N 18°39′12″E	9106	Tromsø
Strupen	69°09′25″N 19°10′40″E	9055	Balsfjord
Strømsmoen	68°45′42″N 18°34′13″E	9360	Bardu
Sultindvik	69°21′05″N 18°29′10″E	9302	Senja
Sundlia	69°01′05″N 18°29′06″E	9360	Bardu
Svanelvmoen	69°15′24″N 17°35′23″E	9304	Senja
Svartnes	69°22′32″N 19°07′07″E	9042	Balsfjord
Svensby	69°39′47″N 19°48′57″E	9064	Lyngen
Sæter	69°03′30″N 17°37′51″E	9311	Dyrøy
Sætermoen	69°15′42″N 18°11′53″E	9055	Balsfjord
Sør-Lenangen	69°49′09″N 20°02′00″E	9068	Lyngen
Sørkjosen	69°47′09″N 20°57′01″E	9152	Nordreisa
Sørreisa (†); Orjješ-Ráisa (Northern Sami)	69°08′42″N 18°09′10″E	9310	Sørreisa
Sørrollnes; Orjješ-Rállegeahci (Northern Sami)	68°43′42″N 16°50′22″E	9450	Ibestad
Sørstraumen	69°50′30″N 21°51′36″E	9162	Kvænangen
Sørvika	68°47′58″N 17°12′55″E	9454	Ibestad
Sørvika	68°41′06″N 16°32′04″E	9419	Harstad
Tennevoll (†)	68°44′49″N 17°48′22″E	9465	Lavangen
Tennskjær	69°28′34″N 18°17′49″E	9302	Senja
Tomasjorda/Lunheim	69°40′00″N 19°01′00″E	9024	Tromsø
Torsken	69°20′19″N 17°06′19″E	9381	Senja
Torsvåg	70°14′11″N 19°30′36″E	9136	Karlsøy
Tovik	68°40′45″N 16°52′10″E	9445	Tjeldsund
Tromsdalen	69°38′39″N 18°59′57″E	9020	Tromsø
Tromvik	69°46′43″N 18°24′05″E	9107	Tromsø
Trondjorda	69°50′28″N 18°51′48″E	9100	Tromsø
Trøsemarka; Vuopmegeahci (Northern Sami)	68°33′59″N 16°45′36″E	9440	Tjeldsund
Tussøy	69°38′47″N 18°06′49″E	9128	Tromsø
Tønsvik	69°44′51″N 19°10′36″E	9022	Tromsø
Tårnelvmoen	69°18′49″N 18°17′11″E	9302	Senja
Uløybukt	69°51′29″N 20°41′11″E	9197	Skjervøy
Undereidet; Muotkkevuolli (Northern Sami)	69°52′05″N 21°58′50″E	9162	Kvænangen
Utstrand	68°48′40″N 16°05′53″E	9475	Kvæfjord
Valanhamn	69°57′46″N 21°31′23″E	9162	Kvænangen
Vang	69°28′29″N 18°01′21″E	9372	Senja
Vangsvik (†)	69°10′14″N 17°44′02″E	9304	Senja
Vannareid	70°12′01″N 19°36′18″E	9136	Karlsøy
Vannavalen	70°07′21″N 19°58′26″E	9135	Karlsøy
Vannvåg	70°04′21″N 19°58′55″E	9135	Karlsøy
Vasstrand	69°39′23″N 18°14′12″E	9100	Tromsø
Vengsøy	69°49′30″N 18°31′06″E	9120	Tromsø
Vesterfjell	69°12′10″N 17°40′25″E	9304	Senja
Vika	68°51′20″N 16°29′05″E	9402	Harstad
Vikran	69°32′34″N 18°46′15″E	9057	Tromsø
Vinje	69°00′35″N 17°22′07″E	9311	Dyrøy
Vollstad	69°24′01″N 19°38′42″E	9056	Tromsø
Vorterøyskagen	69°59′10″N 20°38′31″E	9197	Skjervøy
Vågan or Russevåg Nordre	69°11′45″N 17°56′41″E	9303	Senja
Våtvoll	68°34′15″N 15°47′45″E	8409	Kvæfjord
Øse	68°37′17″N 17°39′02″E	9470	Gratangen
Øverbygd	69°01′27″N 19°17′45″E	9336	Målselv
Øvergård; Johkamohkki (Northern Sami)	69°11′49″N 19°45′02″E	9040	Balsfjord
Øyjord	69°12′42″N 18°04′39″E	9300	Senja
Øynes	68°46′55″N 16°03′55″E	9475	Kvæfjord
Å	68°50′08″N 17°11′09″E	9454	Ibestad
Å	68°47′01″N 17°46′55″E	9465	Lavangen
Å	69°04′44″N 16°59′59″E	9392	Senja
Åkeneset	68°42′11″N 17°28′59″E	9470	Gratangen
Åndervåg	68°54′53″N 17°10′38″E	9455	Ibestad
Ånstad	68°49′59″N 17°11′09″E	9454	Ibestad
Årbogen	68°34′57″N 16°29′58″E	9430	Harstad
Årstein (†)	68°41′25″N 17°32′32″E	9470	Gratangen
Årviksand	70°11′38″N 20°31′10″E	9195	Skjervøy
Åsegarden	68°47′38″N 16°26′13″E	9402	Harstad
Åsland/Eidkjosen	69°40′35″N 18°46′06″E	9100	Tromsø
