= Tjeldsund =

Tjeldsund may refer to:

== Places ==
- Tjeldsund Municipality, a municipality in Troms county, Norway
- Tjeldsund Bridge, a suspension road bridge that crosses the Tjeldsundet strait in Troms county, Norway
- Tjeldsund Church, a church in Tjeldsund Municipality in Troms county, Norway
- Tjeldsundet, a strait in Troms and Nordland counties, Norway
