= Ramsund =

Ramsund may refer to:

== Places ==
- Ramsund, Norway, a village in Tjeldsund municipality, Nordland county, Norway
- Ramsund Chapel, a chapel in Tjeldsund municipality, Nordland county, Norway
- Ramsund Bridge, a bridge in Tjeldsund municipality, Nordland county, Norway
- Ramsund naval base, a Royal Norwegian Navy base
- Ramsund, Sweden, a place in Eskilstuna Municipality, Sweden

== Other ==
- Ramsund carving, a runic stone carving in Ramsund, Sweden
