= Hol, Tjeldsund =

Village in Tjeldsund Municipality, Norway

Hol, Tjeldsund: Hol (Norwegian); Hovllák (Northern Sami); Hol i Tjeldsund
- Village
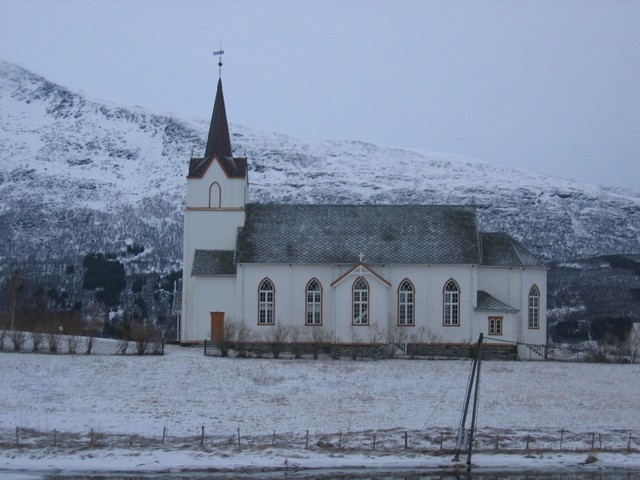
- Tjeldsund Church
- Interactive map of Hol, Tjeldsund
- Location within Troms Location within Norway
- Coordinates: 68.5492°N 16.3923°E
- Country: Norway
- Region: Northern Norway
- County: Troms
- District: Ofoten
- Municipality: Tjeldsund Municipality
- Elevation: 17 m (56 ft)
- Time zone: UTC+01:00 (CET)
  - Summer (DST): UTC+02:00 (CEST)
- Post Code: 9444 Hol i Tjeldsund

Hol (Norwegian) or Hovllák (Northern Sami) is a village in Tjeldsund Municipality in Troms county, Norway. The village is located along the Tjeldsundet strait on the northeastern shore of the island of Tjeldøya. The village lies about 7 kilometres (4.3 mi) north of the Ramsund Bridge. Tjeldsund Church is located in this village.

The village was the administrative centre of Tjeldsund Municipality until 1 January 2020 when Tjeldsund Municipality and Skånland Municipality merged and the larger village of Evenskjer was chosen to be the new administrative centre of the newly enlarged municipality.
