= Fjelldal =

Village in Tjeldsund Municipality, Norway

Fjelldal Nedre Fjelldal
- Village
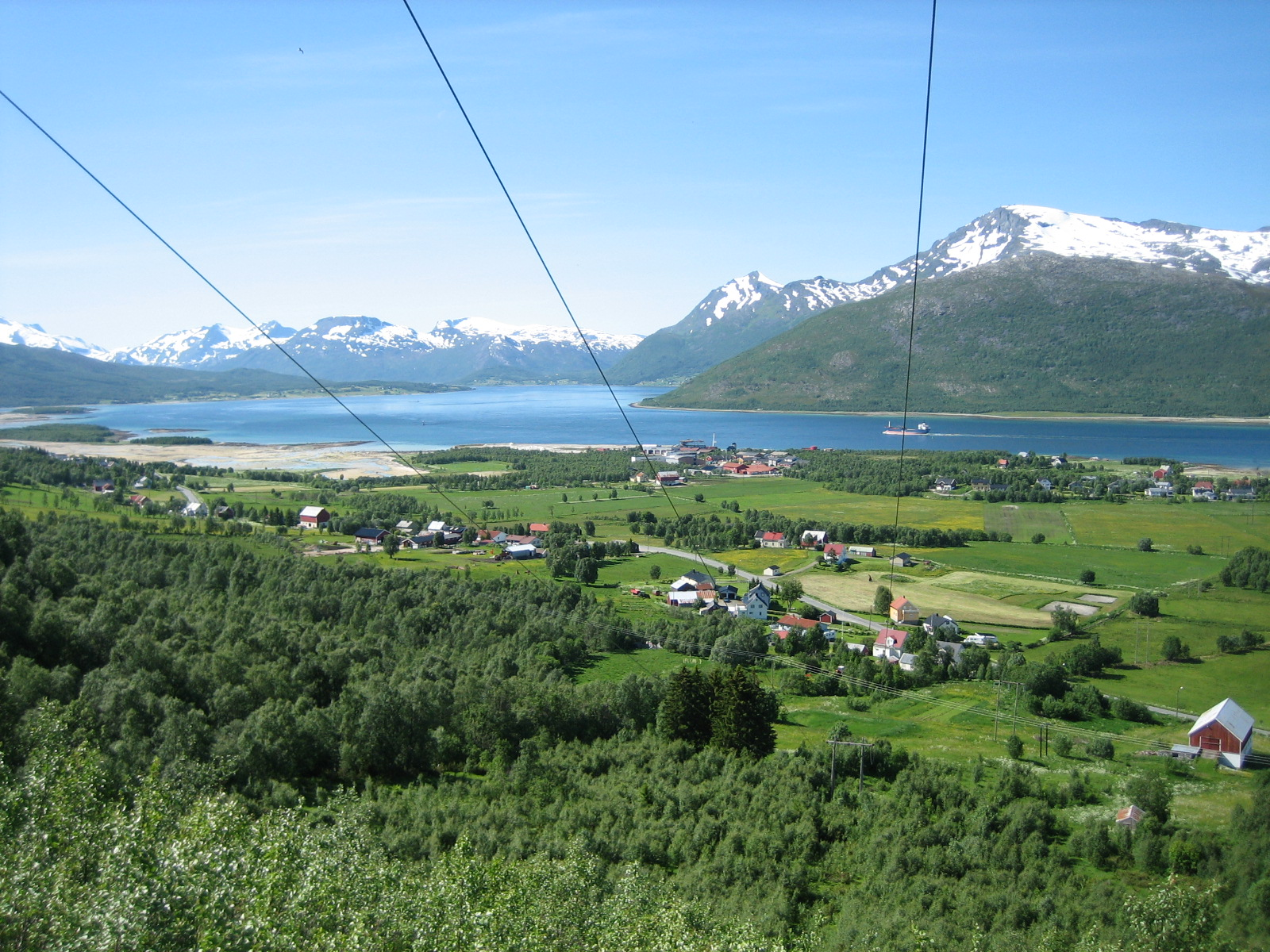
- View of the village
- Interactive map of Fjelldal
- Location within Troms Location within Norway
- Coordinates: 68.5561°N 16.5262°E
- Country: Norway
- Region: Northern Norway
- County: Troms
- District: Ofoten
- Municipality: Tjeldsund Municipality

Area
  - Total: 0.84 km^{2} (0.32 sq mi)
- Elevation: 7 m (23 ft)

Population (2012)
  - Total: 312
  - Density: 371/km^{2} (960/sq mi)
- Time zone: UTC+01:00 (CET)
  - Summer (DST): UTC+02:00 (CEST)
- Post Code: 9441 Fjelldal

Fjelldal is a village in Tjeldsund Municipality in Troms county, Norway. The village is located on the eastern bank of the Tjeldsundet strait in the northeastern part of the municipality. The village is located about halfway between the villages of Ramsund and Evenskjer. The town of Harstad is located about 45 kilometres (28 mi) north of Fjelldal, and Harstad/Narvik Airport, Evenes is reachable by a 15-minute car drive to the southeast. Fjelldal Chapel is located in this village.

The 0.84-square-kilometre (210-acre) village had a population (2012) of 312 and a population density of 371 inhabitants per square kilometre (960/sq mi). Since 2012, the population and area data for this village area has not been separately tracked by Statistics Norway.
