= Vesterfjell =

Vesterfjell may refer to:

- Vesterfjell, Troms, a village in Troms county, Norway
- Kristine Andersen Vesterfjell (1910–1987), a Norwegian Southern Sami reindeer herder Sami cultural advocate
