= Sandstrand =

Sandstrand may refer to the following locations:

- Sandstrand, Nordland, a village in Sortland Municipality in Nordland county, Norway
- Sandstrand, Troms, a village in Tjeldsund Municipality in Troms county, Norway
