= Fjelldal Chapel =

- Fjelldal kapell
- Fjelldal Chapel
- 68.54811806°N 16.5155335°E
- Location: Tjeldsund Municipality, Troms
- Country: Norway
- Denomination: Church of Norway
- Churchmanship: Evangelical Lutheran

History
- Status: Chapel
- Founded: 1960
- Consecrated: 1960

Architecture
- Functional status: Active
- Architect: Birger Stoltenberg
- Architectural type: Long church
- Completed: 1960 (66 years ago)

Specifications
- Capacity: 140
- Materials: Wood

Administration
- Diocese: Nord-Hålogaland
- Deanery: Trondenes prosti
- Parish: Tjeldsund
- Norwegian Cultural Heritage Site
- Type: Church
- Status: Not protected
- ID: 84148

Fjelldal Chapel (Norwegian: Fjelldal kapell) is a chapel of the Church of Norway in Tjeldsund Municipality in Troms county, Norway. It is located in the village of Fjelldal. It is an annex chapel in the Tjeldsund parish which is part of the Trondenes prosti (deanery) in the Diocese of Nord-Hålogaland. The white, wooden chapel was built in a long church style in 1960, using plans drawn up by the architect Birger Stoltenberg. The chapel seats about 140 people.

== See also ==
- List of churches in Nord-Hålogaland
