= Myklebostad, Tjeldsund =

Village in Tjeldsund Municipality, Norway

Myklebostad, Tjeldsund: Myklebostad (Norwegian); Mihkkelbovllak (Northern Sami)
- Village
- Interactive map of Myklebostad, Tjeldsund
- Location within Troms Location within Norway
- Coordinates: 68.4271°N 16.3385°E
- Country: Norway
- Region: Northern Norway
- County: Troms
- District: Ofoten
- Municipality: Tjeldsund Municipality
- Elevation: 16 m (52 ft)
- Time zone: UTC+01:00 (CET)
  - Summer (DST): UTC+02:00 (CEST)
- Post Code: 9443 Myklebostad

Myklebostad (Norwegian) or Mihkkelbovllak (Northern Sami) is a village in Tjeldsund Municipality in Troms county, Norway. The village is located along the Ofotfjorden on the southern shore of Tjeldøya island.
