= Tjeldsund Bridge =

Tjeldsund Bridge Tjeldsundbrua
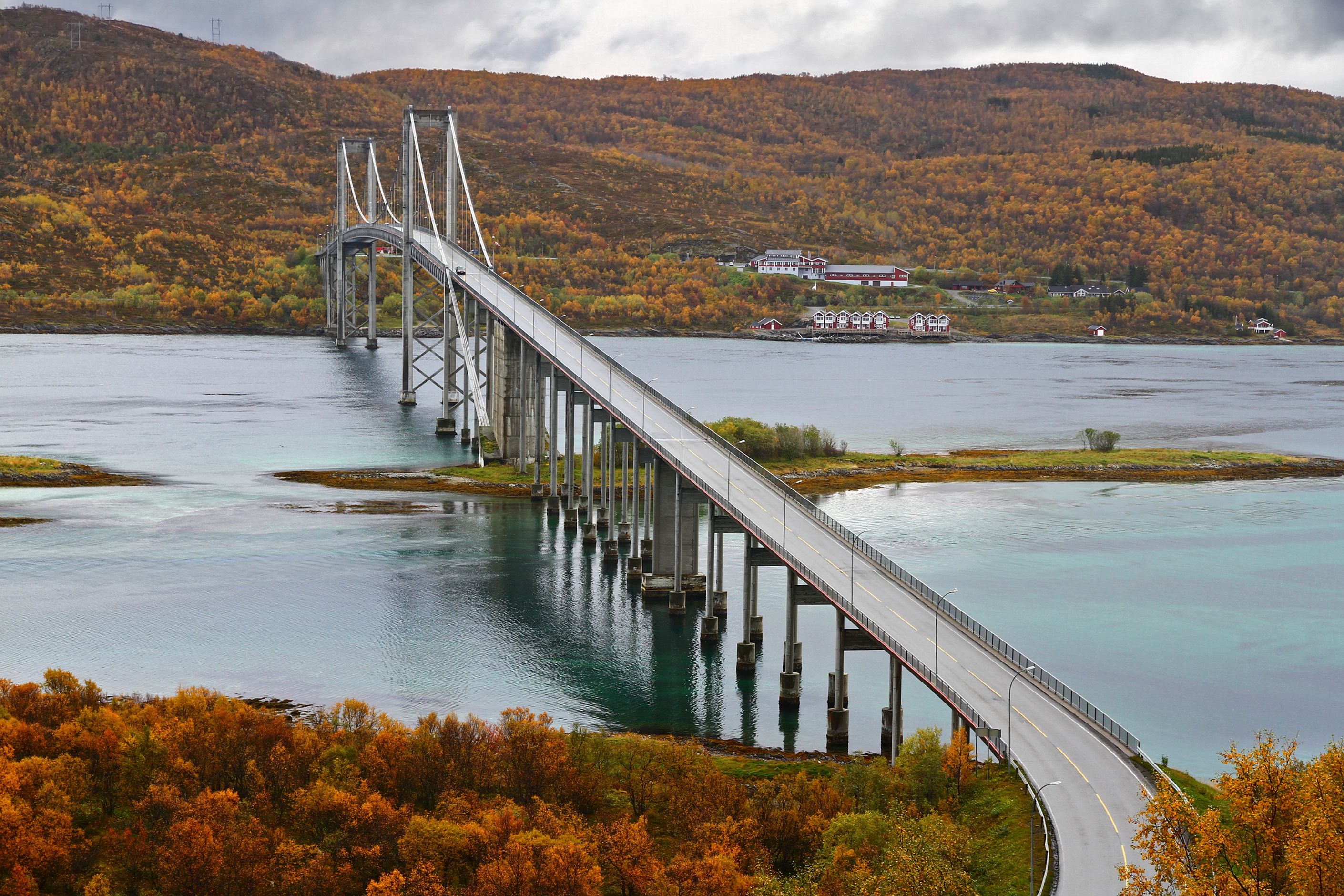
- Tjeldsund bridge
- Coordinates: 68.628235°N 16.578712°E
- Carries: E10
- Crosses: Tjeldsundet
- Locale: Troms, Norway

Characteristics
- Design: suspension road bridge
- Material: Steel and cement
- Total length: 1,007 metres (3,304 ft)
- Width: 9.3 metres (31 ft)
- Longest span: 290 metres (950 ft)
- No. of spans: 32
- Clearance below: 41 metres (135 ft)

History
- Construction cost: 45 million kr
- Opened: 22 October 1967

The Tjeldsund Bridge (Norwegian: Tjeldsundbrua) is a suspension road bridge that crosses the Tjeldsundet strait between the mainland and the island of Hinnøya in Troms county, Norway. The bridge is 1,007 metres (3,304 ft) long, the main span is 290 metres (950 ft), and the maximum clearance to the sea is 41 metres (135 ft). The bridge has 32 spans.

After 30 months and 375,000 work hours, 112,000 bags of cement, 1200 tons of steel and the cost of 45 million kr, Tjeldsund Bridge was opened by King Olav V on 22 August 1967.

The bridge carries the European route E10 highway, connecting Harstad Municipality and Tjeldsund Municipality. It is part of a network of bridges that connect the islands of Vesterålen and Lofoten to the mainland of Norway.

== Gallery ==
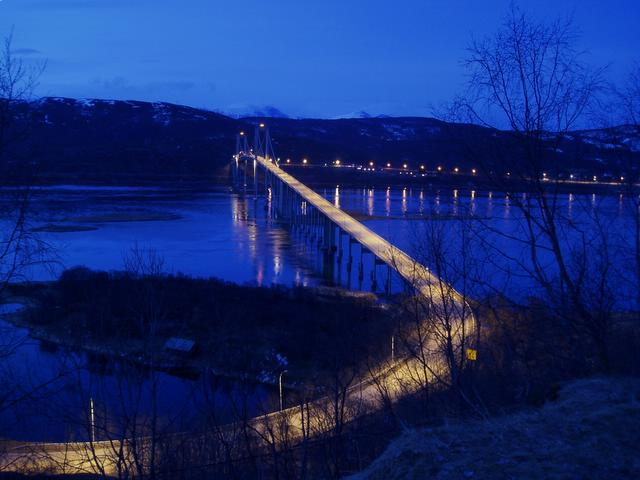
Tjeldsundbrua lighted at night

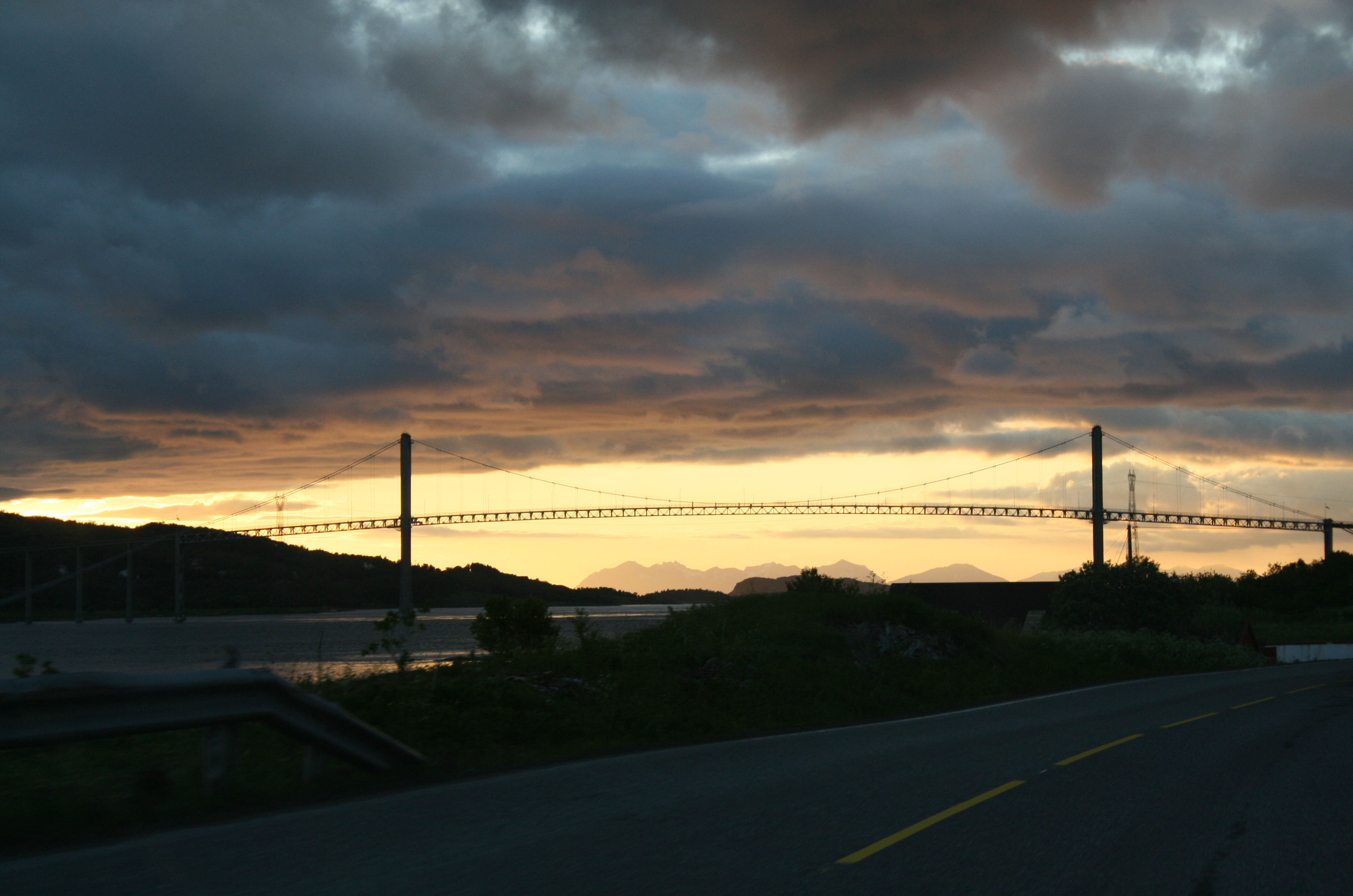
Tjeldsundbrua at dusk

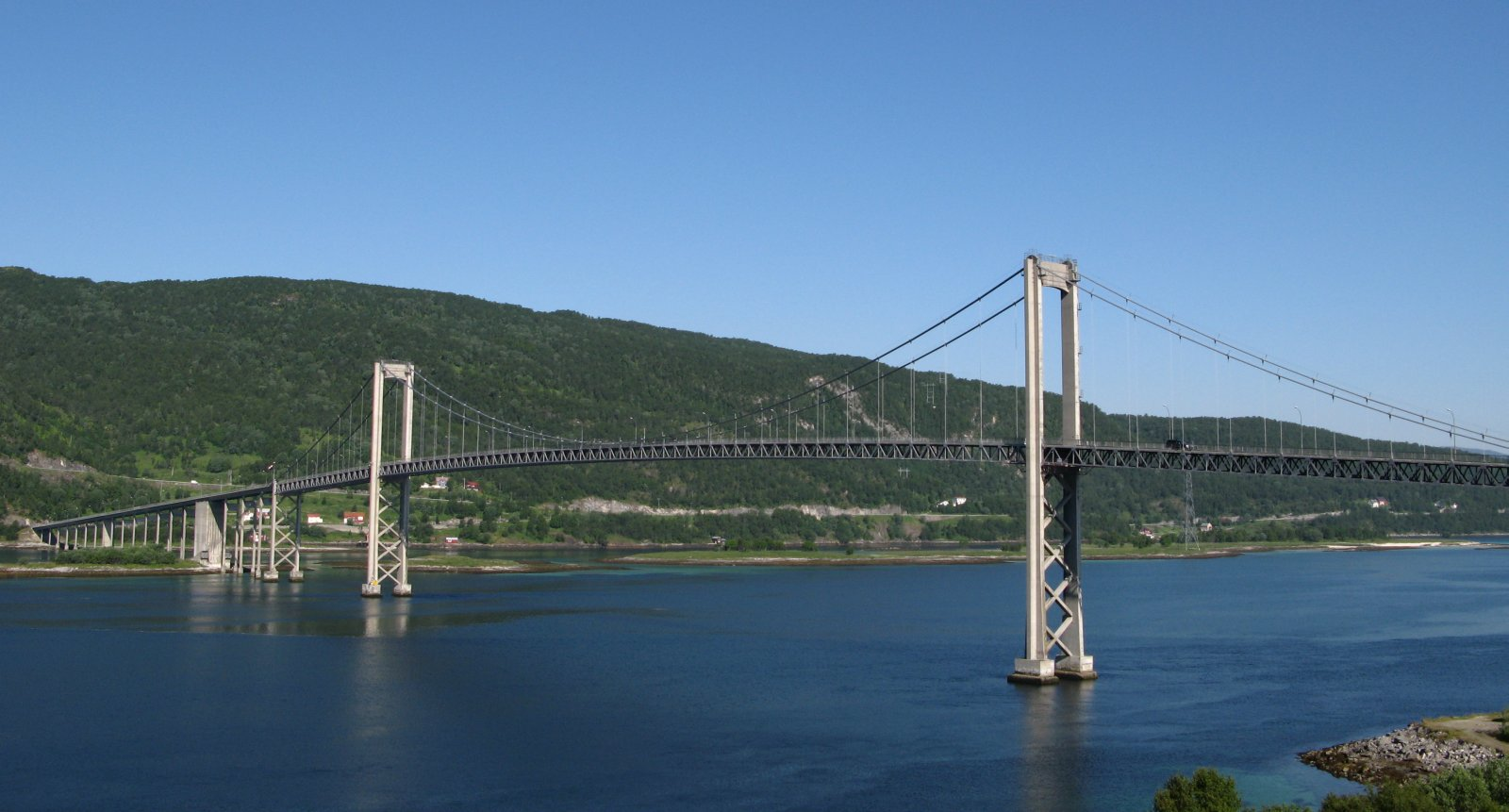
Tjeldsundbrua

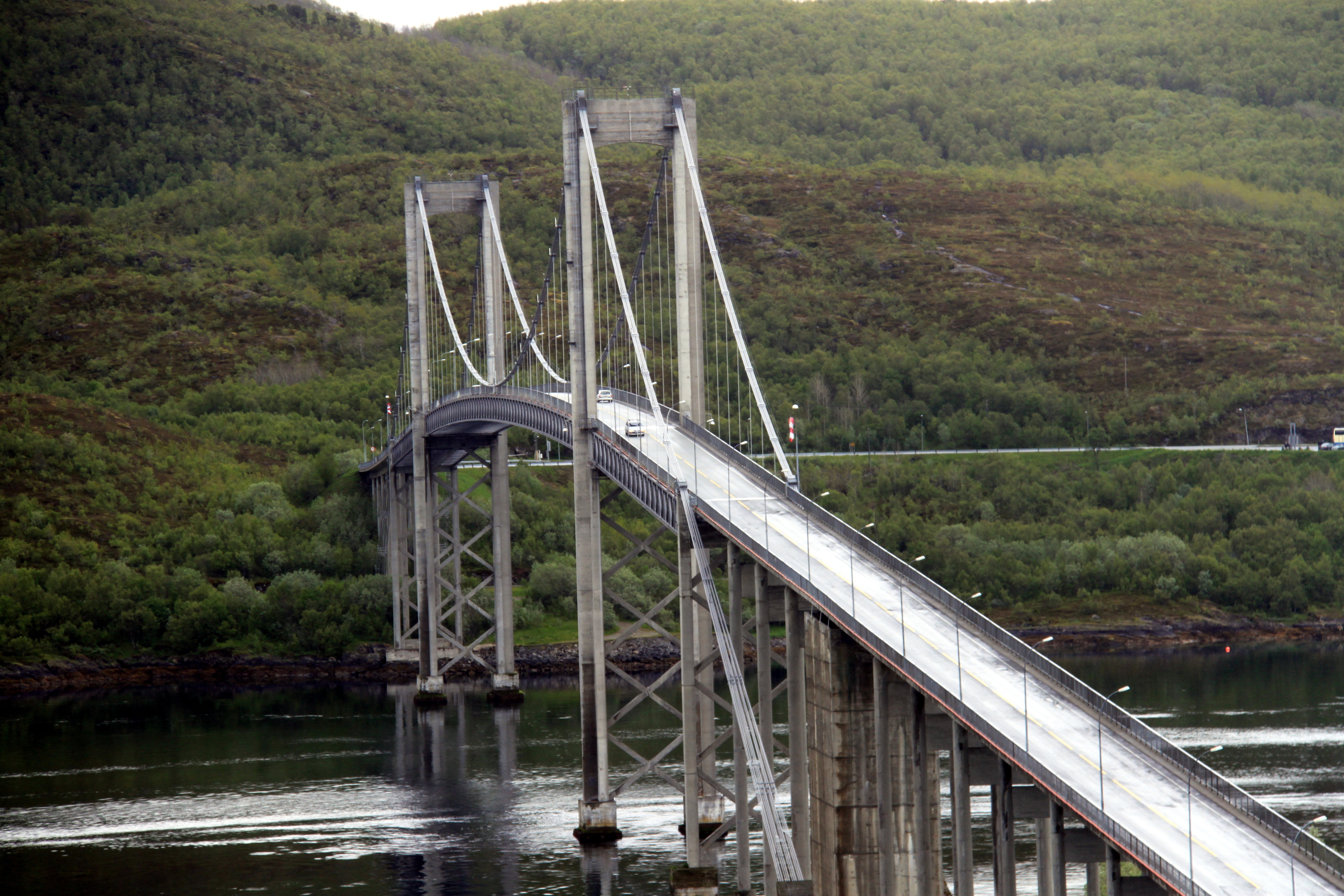
Tjeldsundbrua
