= Sandstrand, Troms =

Village in Tjeldsund Municipality, Norway

Sandstrand (Norwegian); Sáhtik (Northern Sami)
- Village
- Interactive map of: Sandstrand (Norwegian); Sáhtik (Northern Sami)
- Location within Troms Location within Norway
- Coordinates: 68°40′41″N 16°47′11″E
- Country: Norway
- Region: Northern Norway
- County: Troms
- District: Central Hålogaland
- Municipality: Tjeldsund Municipality
- Elevation: 13 m (43 ft)
- Time zone: UTC+01:00 (CET)
  - Summer (DST): UTC+02:00 (CEST)
- Post Code: 9445 Tovik

Sandstrand (Norwegian) or Sáhtik (Northern Sami) is a village in Tjeldsund Municipality in Troms county, Norway. The village is located along the Vagsfjorden, just west of the minor village of Tovik, at the mouth of the Astafjorden. It is located about midway between the small villages of Evenskjer and Grov. The population (2001) of Sandstrand is 303.

The sports club IL Santor has its base in Sandstrand, though their football grounds is situated in nearby Renså.

== Economy ==
The village boomed economically in the late 1970s and early 1980s. In the 1990s, however, most businesses had to close down due to competition from nearby cities and towns. Since being a thriving village, Sandstrand has arguably dwindled somewhat into rural passivity during recent years. Since then, many inhabitants commute to other areas where employment is easier to find.
