= Vatnjavárri =

Village in Tjeldsund Municipality, Norway

Vatnjavárri (Northern Sami); Boltåsen (Norwegian); Boltås (Norwegian)
- Village
- Interactive map of: Vatnjavárri (Northern Sami); Boltåsen (Norwegian)
- Location within Troms Location within Norway
- Coordinates: 68.53241°N 16.70509°E
- Country: Norway
- Region: Northern Norway
- County: Troms
- District: Central Hålogaland
- Municipality: Tjeldsund Municipality
- Elevation: 59 m (194 ft)
- Time zone: UTC+01:00 (CET)
  - Summer (DST): UTC+02:00 (CEST)
- Post Code: 9440 Evenskjer

Vatnjavárri (Northern Sami) or Boltåsen (Norwegian) is a Sámi hamlet or small village in Tjeldsund Municipality in Troms county, Norway. The village is located about 8 kilometres (5.0 mi) southeast of the village of Evenskjer and about 4 kilometres (2.5 mi) north of the Harstad/Narvik Airport.

The hamlet was home to the Boltås skole (Northern Sami: Vaknjavári skuvla), a bilingual Sámi–Norwegian public primary school. The school closed in 2013 at which time it had 25 students in seven classes. Historically, this village was part of Skånland Municipality until 1 January 2020 when it became part of Tjeldsund Municipality.
