= Tjeldsund Church =

- Tjeldsund kirke
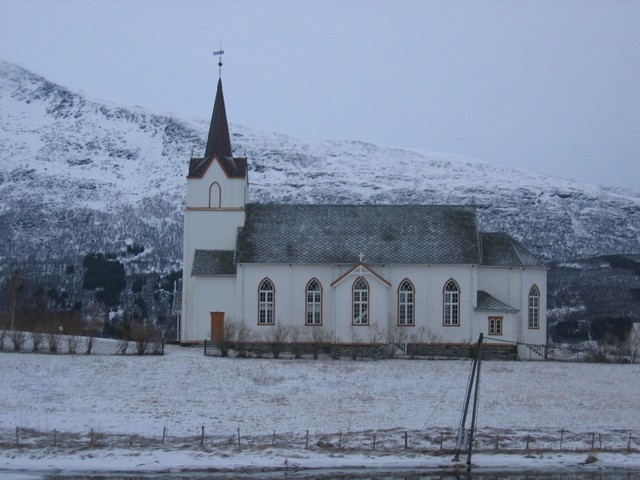
- View of the church
- Tjeldsund Church
- 68.5472001°N 16.3989044°E
- Location: Tjeldsund Municipality, Troms
- Country: Norway
- Denomination: Church of Norway
- Churchmanship: Evangelical Lutheran

History
- Former name: a
- Status: Parish church
- Founded: 16th century
- Consecrated: 1901

Architecture
- Functional status: Active
- Architect: Ole Scheistrøen
- Architectural type: Long church
- Completed: 1901 (125 years ago)

Specifications
- Capacity: 420
- Materials: Wood

Administration
- Diocese: Nord-Hålogaland
- Deanery: Trondenes prosti
- Parish: Tjeldsund
- Norwegian Cultural Heritage Site
- Type: Church
- Status: Listed
- ID: 85632

Tjeldsund Church (Norwegian: Tjeldsund kirke) is a parish church of the Church of Norway in Tjeldsund Municipality in Troms county, Norway. It is located in the village of Hol i Tjeldsund on the island of Tjeldøya. It is the main church for the Tjeldsund parish which is part of the Trondenes prosti (deanery) in the Diocese of Nord-Hålogaland. The white, wooden church was built in a long church style in 1901 using plans drawn up by the architect Ole Scheistrøen. The church seats about 420 people.

== History ==
The earliest existing historical records of the church date back to 1589, but the church was not new at that time. The medieval churches were located about 60 metres (200 ft) to the east of the present site, nearly to the shoreline of the fjord. Not much is recorded about the early medieval churches, but in 1703 a new church building was constructed (or a previous building was heavily renovated). In 1768, a new church was built on the site. This church was a long church design with a sacristy. The entry porch on the new church was constructed from salvaged materials from the old church. The church measured about 16 by 5 metres (52 ft × 16 ft). In 1862, a new church was constructed about 60 metres (200 ft) west of the old church. After the new church was completed, the old church was torn down and its materials were purchased by a local man who used them to build a barn. In 1899-1901, the church was dismantled and heavily remodelled after expanding the foundation walls. After the renovation, it has a rectangular nave and narrower, rectangular choir with a narrower, apse on the end of the choir. On each side of the choir there are sacristies. To the west is an entry porch with a tower above it. There are also two small extensions on each side of the nave which give the building a cross-shape.

== Media gallery ==
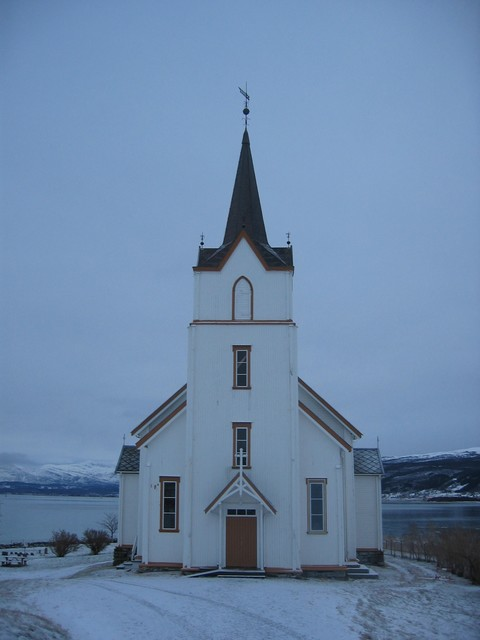

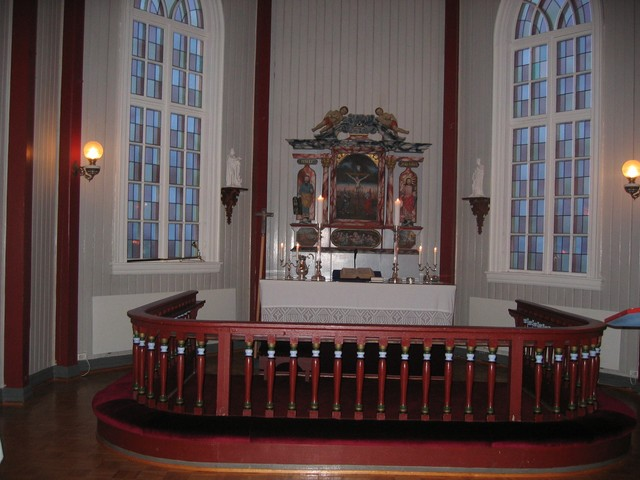

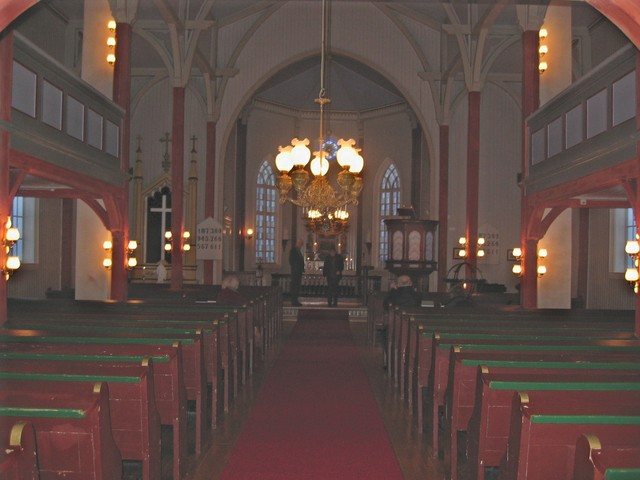

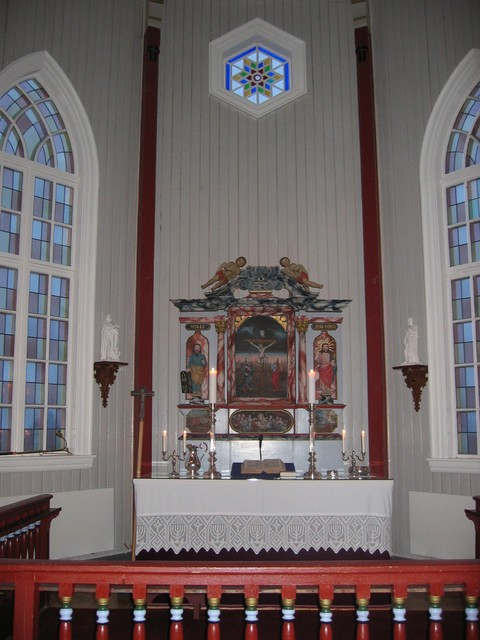

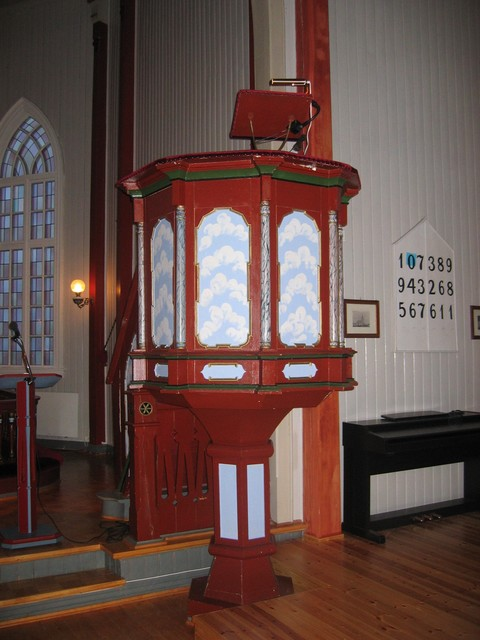

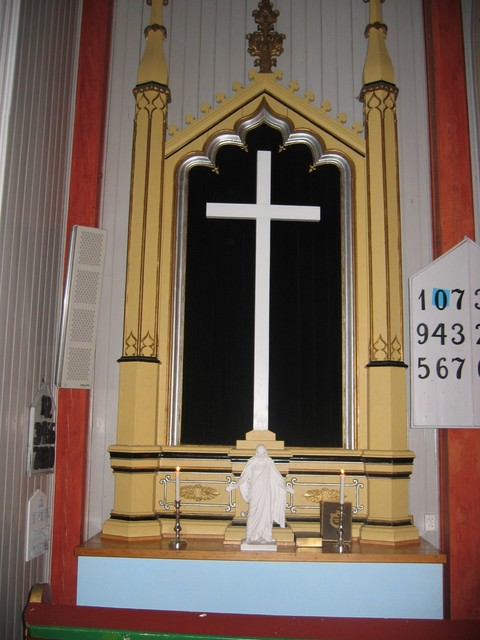

== See also ==
- List of churches in Nord-Hålogaland
