= Tovik Church =

- Tovik kirke
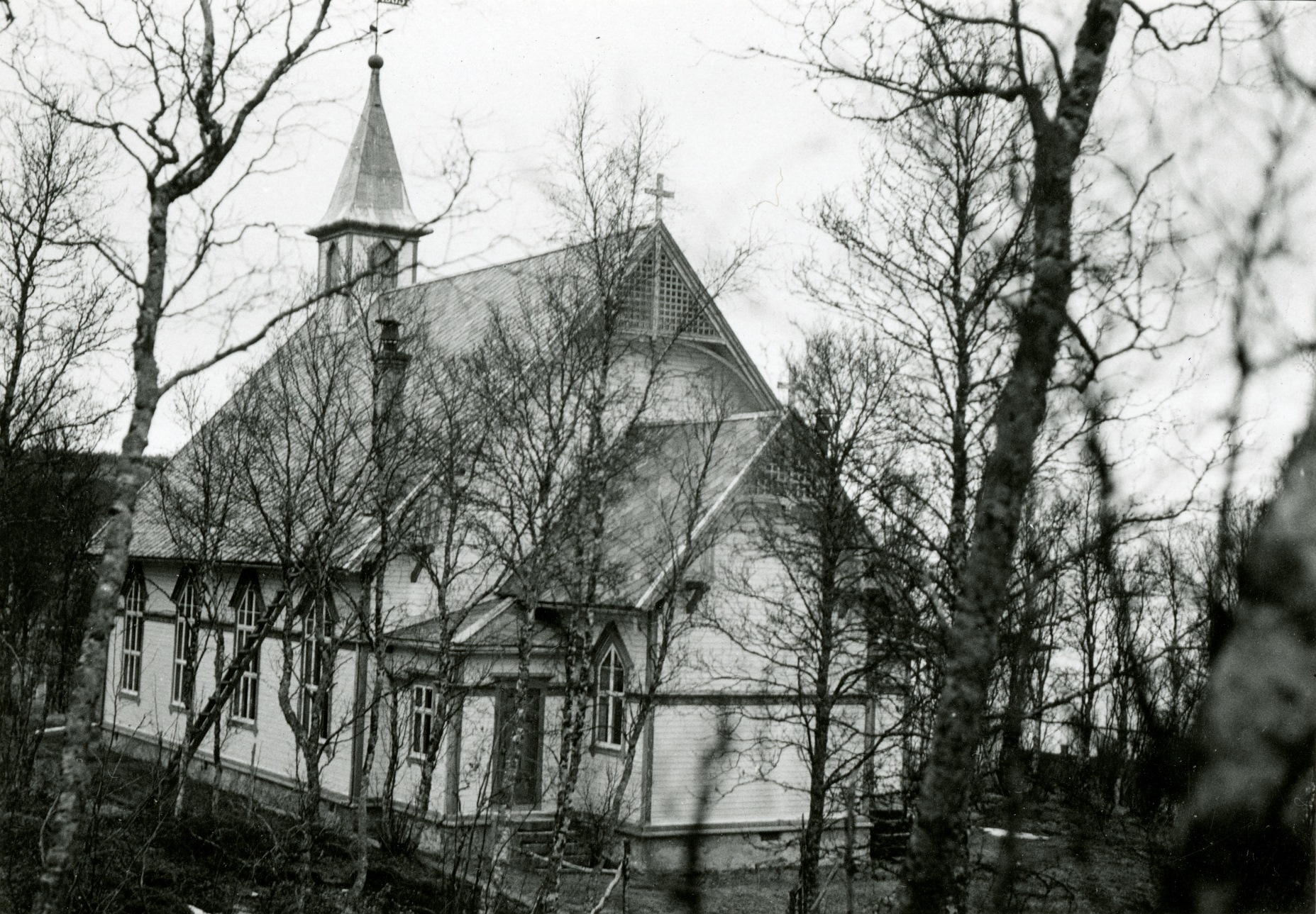
- View of the church
- Tovik Church
- 68.6796421°N 16.8770009°E
- Location: Tjeldsund Municipality, Troms
- Country: Norway
- Denomination: Church of Norway
- Churchmanship: Evangelical Lutheran

History
- Status: Parish church
- Founded: 1905
- Consecrated: 1905

Architecture
- Functional status: Active
- Architect: N. Saxegaard
- Architectural type: Long church
- Completed: 1905 (121 years ago)

Specifications
- Capacity: 200
- Materials: Wood

Administration
- Diocese: Nord-Hålogaland
- Deanery: Trondenes prosti
- Parish: Tovik
- Norwegian Cultural Heritage Site
- Type: Church
- Status: Listed
- ID: 85661

Tovik Church (Norwegian: Tovik kirke) is a parish church of the Church of Norway in Tjeldsund Municipality in Troms county, Norway. It is located in the village of Tovik. It is the church for the Tovik parish which is part of the Trondenes prosti (deanery) in the Diocese of Nord-Hålogaland. The white, wooden church was built in a long church style in 1905 using plans drawn up by the architect N. Saxegaard. The church seats about 200 people.

== See also ==
- List of churches in Nord-Hålogaland
