= Renså =

Village in Tjeldsund Municipality, Norway

Renså (Norwegian); Reanssuk (Northern Sami)
- Village
- Interactive map of: Renså (Norwegian); Reanssuk (Northern Sami)
- Location within Troms Location within Norway
- Coordinates: 68°41′10″N 16°54′46″E
- Country: Norway
- Region: Northern Norway
- County: Troms
- District: Central Hålogaland
- Municipality: Tjeldsund Municipality
- Elevation: 16 m (52 ft)
- Time zone: UTC+01:00 (CET)
  - Summer (DST): UTC+02:00 (CEST)
- Post Code: 9445 Tovik

Renså (Norwegian) or Reanssuk (Northern Sami) is a small village in Tjeldsund Municipality in Troms county, Norway. It is located just east of the slightly larger village of Tovik, and about 4 km (2.5 mi) east of the village of Sandstrand. The population (2001) of Renså is 69. The village is located next to the Rensåelva river which flows into the Astafjorden from the Rensåvatnet lake. The nearest larger village is Grov, about 11 km (6.8 mi) to the east.

Agriculture is the main economic activity. The football grounds of the sports club IL Santor are situated on the ridge just above the village, which is called Rensåhøgda.
