= Mjelde =

Mjelde is a surname. Notable people with the surname include:

- Erik Mjelde (born 1984), Norwegian footballer
- Maren Mjelde (born 1989), Norwegian footballer
- Mons Ivar Mjelde (born 1967), Norwegian footballer
- Ole Monsen Mjelde (1865–1942), Norwegian politician
- Sigmund Mjelve (1926–1995), Norwegian writer
