= Sultindvik =

Village in Senja municipality, Norway

Coordinates: 69°21′1.5408″N 18°29′12.840″E

Sultindvik is a village in the far east part of Senja Municipality, in Troms county in northern Norway. The village lies on the west side of Målselvfjorden, under the mountains of Sultinden and Vassbruna. Sultindvik has a road link via fylkesvei 261 west to Rossfjordstraumen (12 km), where there is a school and shops. The population of Sultindvik has gradually decreased, and there are now less than 50 living in the village.

== Statistics ==
Sultindvik statistical area lies in the Rossfjord area, and is the easternmost statistical area in the municipality. The settlement comprises the stretch from Målsjorda up to and including the road to Sandnes. Area: 27.06 km²

=== Inhabitants ===
2000	2005	2010	2014
62	48	43	36
