= Ramsund Chapel =

- Ramsund kapell
- Ramsund Chapel
- 68.4899755°N 16.5221876°E
- Location: Tjeldsund Municipality, Troms
- Country: Norway
- Denomination: Church of Norway
- Churchmanship: Evangelical Lutheran

History
- Status: Chapel
- Founded: 1964
- Consecrated: 1964
- Events: Fire (1970)

Architecture
- Functional status: Active
- Architectural type: Long church
- Completed: 1964 (62 years ago)

Specifications
- Capacity: 250
- Materials: Wood

Administration
- Diocese: Nord-Hålogaland
- Deanery: Trondenes prosti
- Parish: Tjeldsund
- Norwegian Cultural Heritage Site
- Type: Church
- Status: Not protected
- ID: 85266

Ramsund Chapel (Norwegian: Ramsund kapell) is a chapel of the Church of Norway in Tjeldsund Municipality in Troms county, Norway. It is located in the village of Ramsund. It is an annex chapel in the Tjeldsund parish which is part of the Trondenes prosti (deanery) in the Diocese of Nord-Hålogaland. The white, wooden chapel was built in a long church style in 1964. The chapel seats about 250 people. The chapel was rebuilt in 1970 after a fire.

== See also ==
- List of churches in Nord-Hålogaland
