= Tjeldøya =

Island in Troms, Norway

Native name: Tjeldøya (Norwegian); Dielddasuolu (Northern Sami)
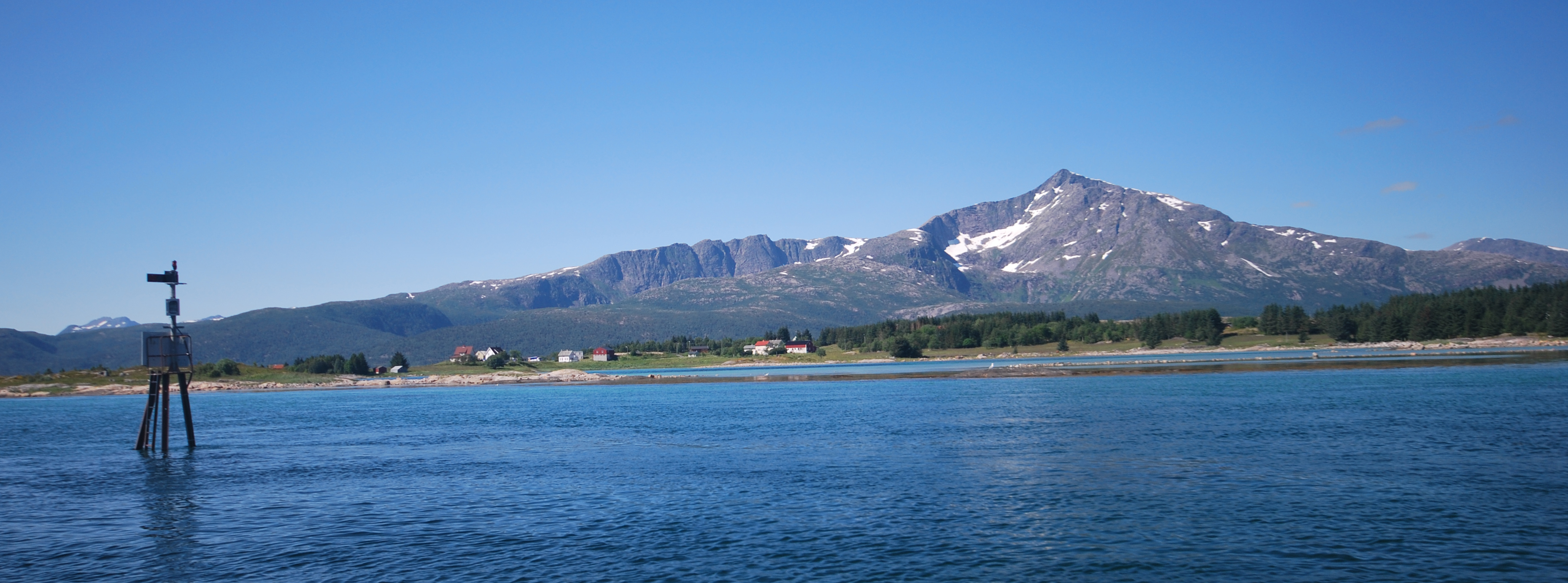
- Interactive map of Tjeldøya

Geography
- Location: Troms, Norway
- Coordinates: 68.4526°N 16.1638°E
- Area: 187 km^{2} (72 sq mi)
- Highest elevation: 1,010 m (3310 ft)
- Highest point: Trollfjellet

Administration
- Norway
- County: Troms
- Municipality: Tjeldsund Municipality

Demographics
- Population: 192 (2016)
- Pop. density: 1/km^{2} (3/sq mi)

Tjeldøya (Norwegian; Northern Sami: Dielddasuolu) is an island in Troms county, Norway. The 187-square-kilometre (72 sq mi) island is located entirely in Tjeldsund Municipality. North and west of the island lies the Tjeldsundet strait which separates it from the large island of Hinnøya; south of the island is the Ofotfjorden; and east of the island lies the Ramsundet strait which separates it from the mainland of Norway. Tjeldøya is connected to the mainland by the Ramsund Bridge, about 7 kilometres (4.3 mi) south of the village of Hol.

== See also ==
- List of islands of Norway
