= Ramsund Bridge =

Ramsund Bridge Ramsundbrua
- Coordinates: 68°30′25″N 16°26′58″E
- Carries: Fv711
- Crosses: Ramsundet
- Locale: Tjeldsund, Norway

Characteristics
- Total length: 240 metres (790 ft)
- Longest span: 36 metres (118 ft)

History
- Opened: 1986

The Ramsund Bridge (Norwegian: Ramsundbrua) is a bridge in Troms county, Norway. It crosses the Ramsundet strait between the village of Ramsund on the mainland and the island of Tjeldøya in Tjeldsund Municipality. The bridge is 240 metres (790 ft) long and the longest span is 36 metres (118 ft). The bridge was built in 1986 to replace a ferry route.

== See also ==
- List of bridges in Norway
- List of bridges in Norway by length
- List of bridges
- List of bridges by length
