= Tjeldsund Municipality =

Municipality in Troms, Norway

Tjeldsund Municipality Tjeldsund kommune Dielddanuori suohkan
- Municipality
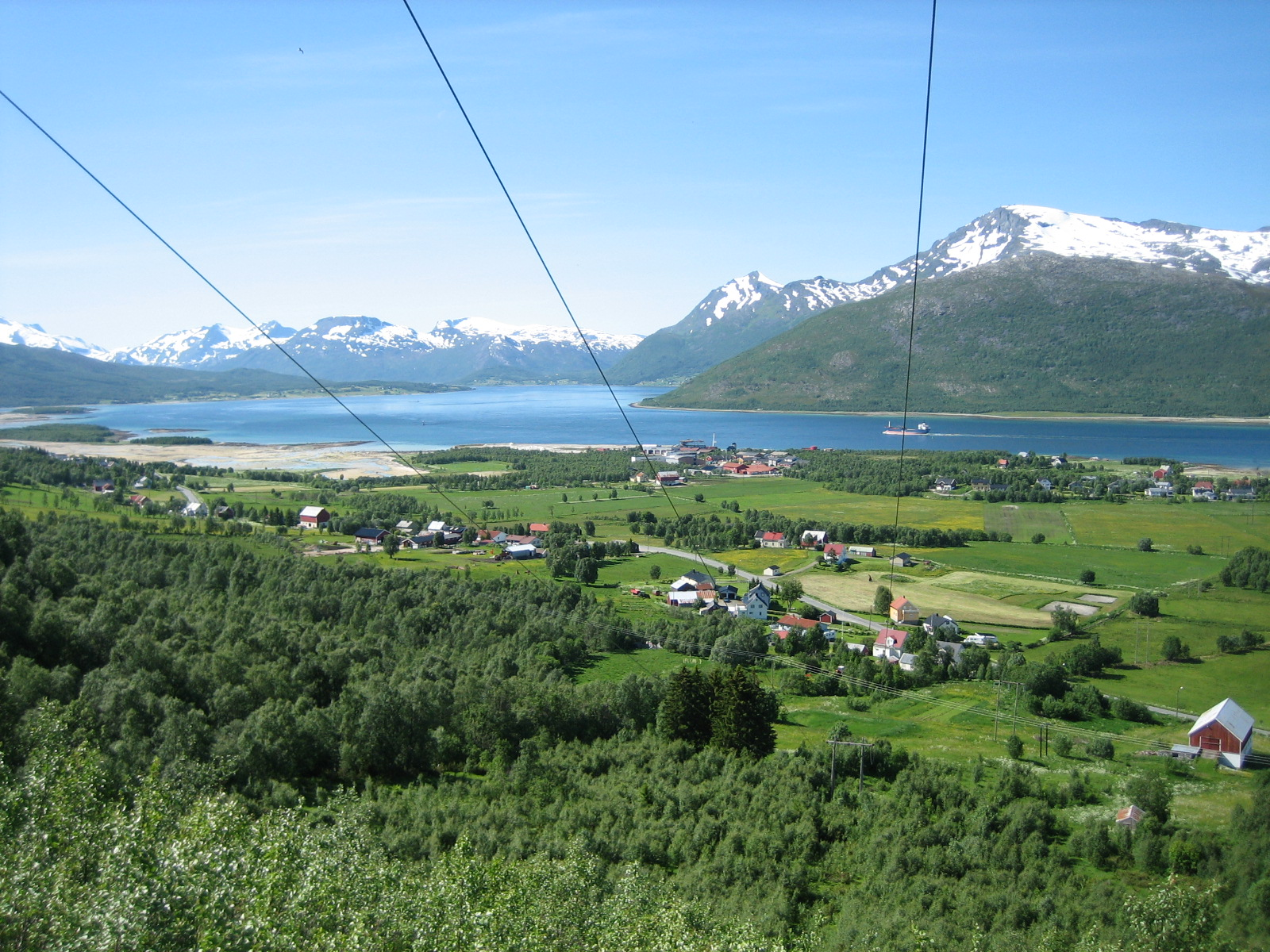
- View of Fjelldal in the summer

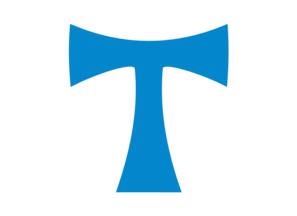
- Flag Coat of arms

- Troms within Norway

- Tjeldsund within Troms
- Coordinates: 68°29′04″N 16°17′33″E
- Country: Norway
- County: Troms
- District: Northern Norway
- Established: 1 Jan 1909
  - Preceded by: Lødingen Municipality
- Administrative centre: Evenskjer

Government
  - Mayor (2023): Robin Ridderseth (LL)

Area
  - Total: 814.41 km^{2} (314.45 sq mi)
  - Land: 774.66 km^{2} (299.10 sq mi)
  - Water: 39.75 km^{2} (15.35 sq mi) 4.9%
  - Rank: #139 in Norway
- Highest elevation: 1,305.86 m (4,284.3 ft)

Population (2024)
  - Total: 4,281
  - Rank: #199 in Norway
  - Density: 5.3/km^{2} (14/sq mi)
  - Change (10 years): ▲ +1.8%
- Demonym: Tjeldsunding

Official language
  - Norwegian form: Bokmål
- Time zone: UTC+01:00 (CET)
  - Summer (DST): UTC+02:00 (CEST)
- ISO 3166 code: NO-5512
- Website: Official website

Tjeldsund (Norwegian) or Dielddanuorri (Northern Sami) is a municipality in Troms county, Norway. The southwestern part of the municipality is part of the traditional district of Ofoten and the rest of the municipality is part of Central Hålogaland. The administrative centre of the municipality is the village of Evenskjer. Other important villages include Boltåsen, Fjelldal, Grov, Myklebostad, Ramsund, Renså, Sandstrand, and Tovika. Norges Brannskole (Norway's education and training center for firemen) is situated in Fjelldal. Marinejegerkommandoen is based south of Ramsund.

The 814-square-kilometre (314 sq mi) municipality is the 139th largest by area out of the 357 municipalities in Norway. Tjeldsund Municipality is the 199th most populous municipality in Norway with a population of 4,281. The municipality's population density is 5.3 inhabitants per square kilometre (14/sq mi) and its population has increased by 1.8% over the previous 10-year period.

== General information ==
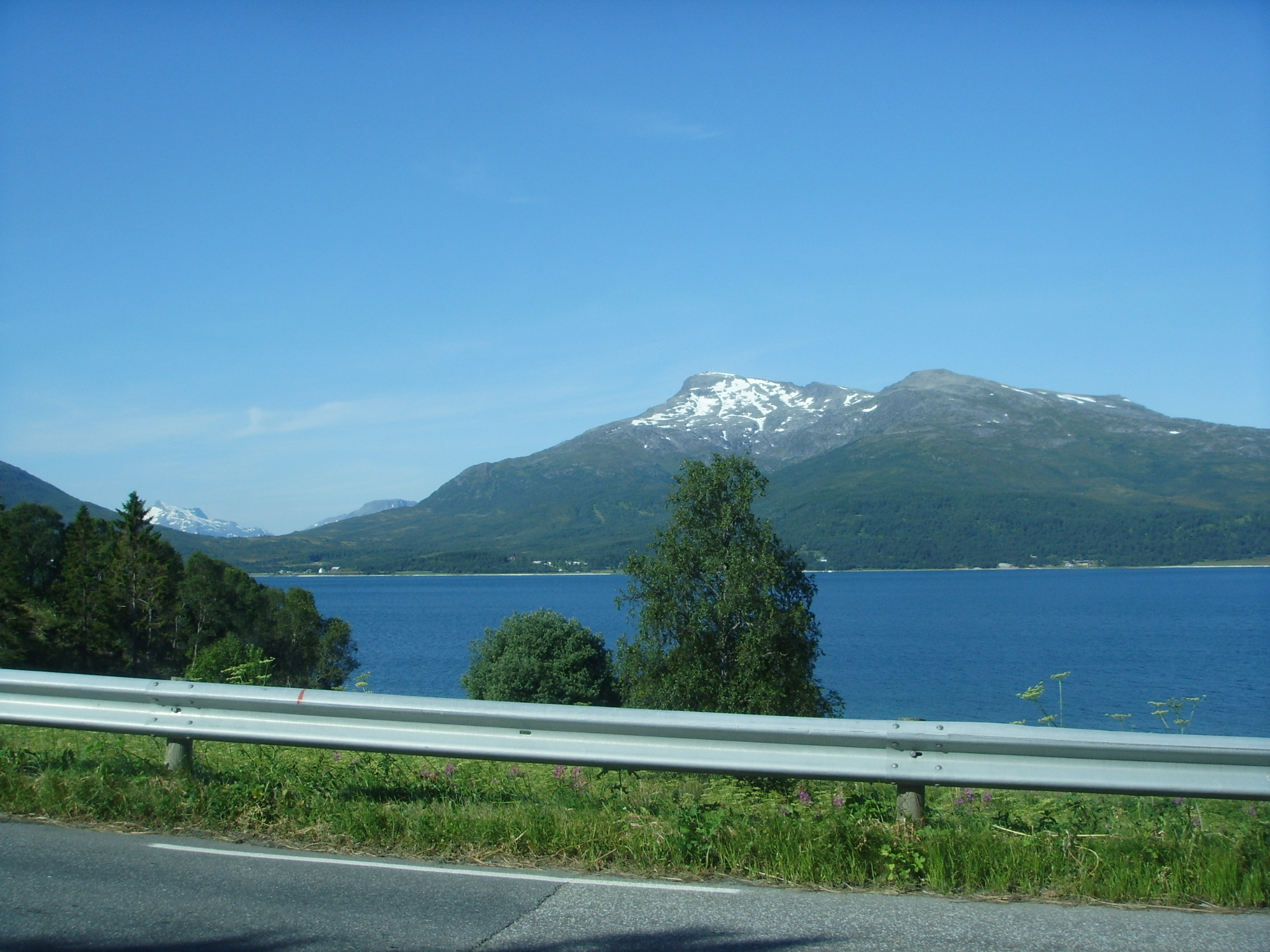
Sætertinden mountain at the Tjeldsund-Harstad municipality border.

The municipality of Tjeldsund was established on 1 January 1909 when it was separated from the large Lødingen Municipality. Tjeldsund encompassed the eastern part of Lødingen prior to the division. Initially, Tjeldsund had a population of 1,404.

During the 1960s, there were many municipal mergers across Norway due to the work of the Schei Committee. On 1 January 1964, the western part of the island of Tjeldøya (population: 297) was transferred to Tjeldsund Municipality from Lødingen Municipality, uniting the whole island within the same municipality. On the same date, the unpopulated Ramnes area of Evenes Municipality was also transferred to Tjeldsund Municipality.

On 1 January 2020, Tjeldsund Municipality merged with the neighboring Skånland Municipality and at the same time the new municipality became a part of the newly formed Troms og Finnmark county (prior to the merger, Skånland was located in the old Troms county and Tjeldsund was in Nordland county). On 1 January 2024, Troms og Finnmark county was divided and the municipality became part of the newly re-created Troms county.

=== Name ===
The municipality is named after the Tjeldsundet strait which runs between the islands of Tjeldøya and Hinnøya. The first element is the (uncompounded) Old Norse name of the island of Tjeldøya (Tjöld or Tjalda). The name of the island is probably derived from the word tjald which means "tent" or the similar word tjaldr which means "oystercatcher". The last element is sund which means "strait" or "sound". On 1 January 2020, when Skånland Municipality became a part of Tjeldsund, the new municipality kept the name Tjeldsund, but also added a co-equal, official name in the Northern Sami language: Dielddanuorri. The two names can be used interchangeably for the municipality. The spelling of the Northern Sami name changes depending on how it is used. It is called Dielddanuorri when it is spelled alone, but it uses the genetive form Dielddanuori when combined with the word for municipality suohkan.

=== Coat of arms ===
The coat of arms was granted on 29 June 1990. The official blazon is "Argent, a cross of St. Anthony azure" (Norwegian: I sølv et blått Antonius-kors). This means the arms have a field (background) that has a tincture of argent which means it is commonly colored white, but if it is made out of metal, then silver is used. The charge is a Cross of Saint Anthony which has a tincture of azure. The blue color in the field symbolizes the importance of the sea. The cross is a canting of the letter T, the first letter of the name Tjeldsund. The blue cross shape also stands for the confluence of the Tjeldsundet and Ramsundet straits which run between the mainland and the islands of Tjeldøya and Hinnøya. The arms were designed by Arvid Sveen.

=== Churches ===
The Church of Norway has four parishes (sokn) within Tjeldsund Municipality. It is part of the Trondenes prosti (deanery) in the Diocese of Nord-Hålogaland.

Churches in Tjeldsund Municipality
Parish (sokn)	Church name	Location of the church	Year built
Astafjord	Astafjord Church	Grov	1978
Skånland	Skånland Church	Evenskjer	1901
Tjeldsund	Tjeldsund Church	Hol i Tjeldsund	1863
Tjeldsund	Fjelldal Chapel	Fjelldal	1960
Tjeldsund	Ramsund Chapel	Ramsund	1964
Tovik	Tovik Church	Tovika	1905

== Geography ==
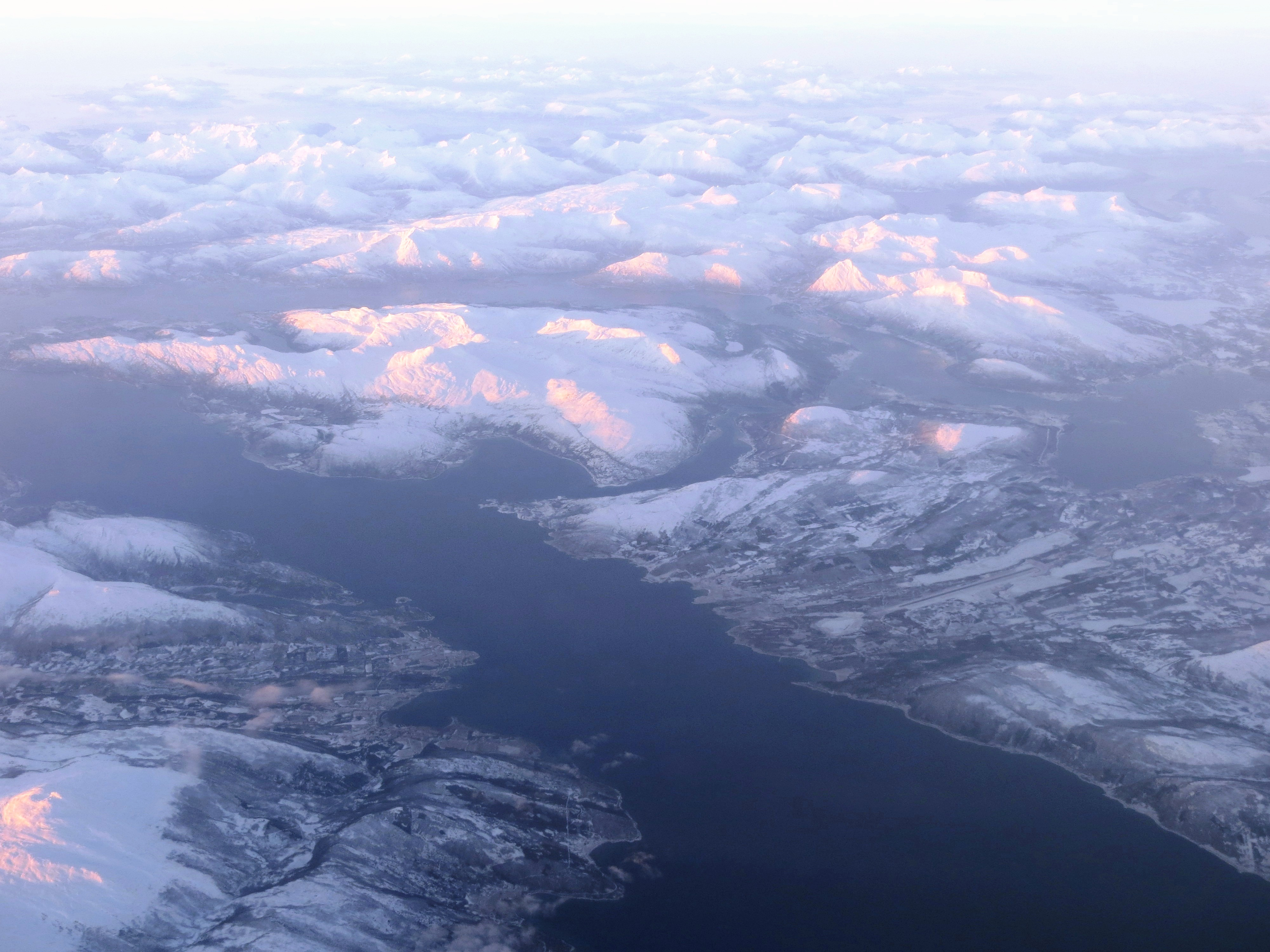
Aerial view over Tjeldsund and part of the Ofotfjorden in January. Tjeldsund is partly located on the mainland, but also includes the island of Tjeldøya.

Tjeldsund is currently located in Troms county on the border with Nordland county to the south and west (prior to 2020, Tjeldsund was smaller, and located in Nordland county). Tjeldsund is partially located on the island of Tjeldøya which is surrounded by the Ofotfjorden on the south; the Tjeldsundet strait to the west, north, and east; and the Ramsundet strait to the east.

The island is connected to the mainland by the Ramsund Bridge. The rest of the municipality is on the mainland to the east of Tjeldøya plus a small area on the island of Hinnøya to the north of Tjeldøya, and the Skånland area on the mainland to the northeast. Evenes Municipality (in Nordland county) and Gratangen Municipality (in Troms county) lie to the east of Tjeldsund; Harstad Municipality, Kvæfjord Municipality, and Ibestad Municipality (in Troms county) lie to the north; Lødingen Municipality lies to the west, and Narvik Municipality (in Nordland county) lies to the south.

The largest lake in the municipality is Skoddebergvatnet on the mainland. The highest point in the municipality is the 1,305.86-metre (4,284.3 ft) tall mountain Skittendalstinden.

=== Climate ===
Climate data for Hol i Tjeldsund 1961-1990
Month	Jan	Feb	Mar	Apr	May	Jun	Jul	Aug	Sep	Oct	Nov	Dec	Year
Daily mean °C (°F)	−3.8 (25.2)	−3.5 (25.7)	−1.8 (28.8)	1.5 (34.7)	6.3 (43.3)	9.9 (49.8)	12.3 (54.1)	11.8 (53.2)	7.9 (46.2)	3.9 (39.0)	−0.2 (31.6)	−2.7 (27.1)	3.5 (38.3)
Average precipitation mm (inches)	101 (4.0)	91 (3.6)	74 (2.9)	61 (2.4)	49 (1.9)	54 (2.1)	76 (3.0)	81 (3.2)	100 (3.9)	141 (5.6)	102 (4.0)	115 (4.5)	1,045 (41.1)
Source: Norwegian Meteorological Institute

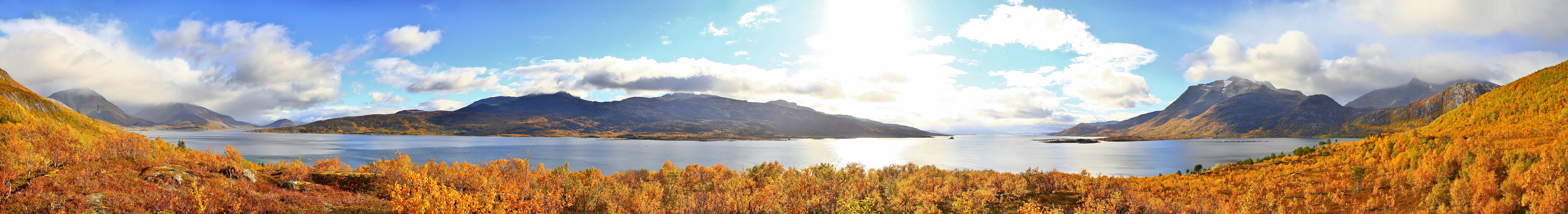
View of the Tjeldsundet (scroll to the left/right to see the whole picture)

== Government ==
Tjeldsund Municipality is responsible for primary education (through 10th grade), outpatient health services, senior citizen services, welfare and other social services, zoning, economic development, and municipal roads and utilities. The municipality is governed by a municipal council of directly elected representatives. The mayor is indirectly elected by a vote of the municipal council. The municipality is under the jurisdiction of the Midtre Hålogaland District Court and the Hålogaland Court of Appeal.

=== Municipal council ===
The municipal council (Kommunestyre) of Tjeldsund Municipality is made up of 21 representatives that are elected to four year terms. The tables below show the current and historical composition of the council by political party.

Tjeldsund kommunestyre 2023–2027
Party name (in Norwegian)	Number of representatives
Labour Party (Arbeiderpartiet)	2
Progress Party (Fremskrittspartiet)	1
Conservative Party (Høyre)	5
Centre Party (Senterpartiet)	2
Socialist Left Party (Sosialistisk Venstreparti)	1
Tjeldsund cross-party list (Tjeldsund tverrpolitiske liste)	6
Total number of members:	21

Tjeldsund kommunestyre 2019–2023
Party name (in Norwegian)	Number of representatives
Labour Party (Arbeiderpartiet)	8
Progress Party (Fremskrittspartiet)	2
Conservative Party (Høyre)	6
Centre Party (Senterpartiet)	3
Socialist Left Party (Sosialistisk Venstreparti)	1
Hinnøy Area Cross-Party List (Hinnøysiden Tverrpolitiske liste)	1
Total number of members:	21
Note: On 1 January 2020, Skånland Municipality became part of Tjeldsund Municipality.

Tjeldsund kommunestyre 2015–2019
Party name (in Norwegian)	Number of representatives
Labour Party (Arbeiderpartiet)	5
Progress Party (Fremskrittspartiet)	2
Conservative Party (Høyre)	5
Centre Party (Senterpartiet)	2
Hinnøy Area Cross-Party List (Hinnøysiden Tverrpolitiske liste)	3
Total number of members:	17

Tjeldsund kommunestyre 2011–2015
Party name (in Norwegian)	Number of representatives
Labour Party (Arbeiderpartiet)	4
Progress Party (Fremskrittspartiet)	2
Conservative Party (Høyre)	7
Hinnøy Area Cross-Party List (Hinnøysiden Tverrpolitiske liste)	3
Municipal List Fiskefjord-Kongsvik-Hårvik (Bygdelista Fiskefjord-Kongsvik-Hårvik)	1
Total number of members:	17

Tjeldsund kommunestyre 2007–2011
Party name (in Norwegian)	Number of representatives
Labour Party (Arbeiderpartiet)	4
Progress Party (Fremskrittspartiet)	3
Conservative Party (Høyre)	5
Centre Party (Senterpartiet)	1
Hinnøy Area Cross-Party List (Hinnøysiden Tverrpolitiske liste)	3
Municipal List Fiskefjord-Kongsvik-Hårvik (Bygdelista Fiskefjord-Kongsvik-Hårvik)	1
Total number of members:	17

Tjeldsund kommunestyre 2003–2007
Party name (in Norwegian)	Number of representatives
Labour Party (Arbeiderpartiet)	4
Progress Party (Fremskrittspartiet)	2
Conservative Party (Høyre)	4
Centre Party (Senterpartiet)	1
Hinnøy Area Cross-Party List (Hinnøysiden Tverrpolitiske liste)	3
Municipal List Fiskefjord-Kongsvik-Hårvik (Bygdelista Fiskefjord-Kongsvik-Hårvik)	1
Tjeldsund cross-party list (Tjeldsund tverrpolitiske liste)	2
Total number of members:	17

Tjeldsund kommunestyre 1999–2003
Party name (in Norwegian)	Number of representatives
Labour Party (Arbeiderpartiet)	4
Progress Party (Fremskrittspartiet)	1
Conservative Party (Høyre)	3
Centre Party (Senterpartiet)	2
Joint list of the Liberal Party and Independents (Venstre og uavhengige)	1
Hinnøy Area Cross-Party List (Hinnøysiden Tverrpolitiske liste)	4
Fjelldal/Ramstad local list (Fjelldal/Ramstad bygdeliste)	3
Tjeldsund cross-party list (Tjeldsund tverrpolitiske liste)	3
Total number of members:	21

Tjeldsund kommunestyre 1995–1999
Party name (in Norwegian)	Number of representatives
Labour Party (Arbeiderpartiet)	4
Conservative Party (Høyre)	1
Joint list of the Centre Party and Independents (Senterpartiet og uavhengige)	3
Hinnøy Area Cross-Party List (Hinnøysiden Tverrpolitiske liste)	6
Fjelldal/Ramstad local list (Fjelldal/Ramstad bygdeliste)	4
Ramsund cross-party list (Ramsund tverrpolitiske liste)	2
Tjeldsund independent cultural list (Tjeldsund uavhengige kulturliste)	1
Total number of members:	21

Tjeldsund kommunestyre 1991–1995
Party name (in Norwegian)	Number of representatives
Labour Party (Arbeiderpartiet)	6
Conservative Party (Høyre)	2
Joint list of the Centre Party (Senterpartiet) and the Christian Democratic Party (Kristelig Folkeparti)	4
Hinnøy Area Cross-Party List (Hinnøysiden Tverrpolitiske liste)	4
Fjelldal/Ramstad local list (Fjelldal/Ramstad bygdeliste)	3
Ramsund cross-party list (Ramsund tverrpolitiske liste)	2
Total number of members:	21

Tjeldsund kommunestyre 1987–1991
Party name (in Norwegian)	Number of representatives
Labour Party (Arbeiderpartiet)	8
Conservative Party (Høyre)	4
Joint list of the Centre Party (Senterpartiet) and the Liberal Party (Venstre)	3
Hinnøy Area Cross-Party List (Hinnøysiden Tverrpolitiske liste)	4
Fjelldal/Ramstad local list (Fjelldal/Ramstad bygdeliste)	2
Total number of members:	21

Tjeldsund kommunestyre 1983–1987
Party name (in Norwegian)	Number of representatives
Labour Party (Arbeiderpartiet)	7
Conservative Party (Høyre)	5
Joint list of the Centre Party (Senterpartiet), Christian Democratic Party (Kristelig Folkeparti), and Liberal Party (Venstre)	3
Non-party district list for Fiskefjord, Kongsvik, Hårvik (Upolitisk distriktsliste for Fiskefjord, Kongsvik, Hårvik)	4
Fjelldal/Ramstad local list (Fjelldal/Ramstad bygdeliste)	3
Total number of members:	21

Tjeldsund kommunestyre 1979–1983
Party name (in Norwegian)	Number of representatives
Labour Party (Arbeiderpartiet)	2
Joint List(s) of Non-Socialist Parties (Borgerlige Felleslister)	12
Fjelldal/Ramstad local list (Fjelldal/Ramstad bygdeliste)	4
Election list for Ramsund (Valgliste for Ramsund)	3
Total number of members:	21

Tjeldsund kommunestyre 1975–1979
Party name (in Norwegian)	Number of representatives
Labour Party (Arbeiderpartiet)	4
Joint List(s) of Non-Socialist Parties (Borgerlige Felleslister)	10
Tjeldsund non-party list (Tjeldsund Upolitiske Liste)	4
Common list for Myklebostad and Ramsund (Fellesliste Myklebostad og Ramsund)	3
Total number of members:	21

Tjeldsund kommunestyre 1971–1975
Party name (in Norwegian)	Number of representatives
Labour Party (Arbeiderpartiet)	6
Joint List(s) of Non-Socialist Parties (Borgerlige Felleslister)	11
Local List(s) (Lokale lister)	4
Total number of members:	21

Tjeldsund kommunestyre 1967–1971
Party name (in Norwegian)	Number of representatives
Labour Party (Arbeiderpartiet)	6
Joint List(s) of Non-Socialist Parties (Borgerlige Felleslister)	12
Local List(s) (Lokale lister)	3
Total number of members:	21

Tjeldsund kommunestyre 1963–1967
Party name (in Norwegian)	Number of representatives
Labour Party (Arbeiderpartiet)	5
Joint List(s) of Non-Socialist Parties (Borgerlige Felleslister)	12
Local List(s) (Lokale lister)	4
Total number of members:	21

Tjeldsund herredsstyre 1959–1963
Party name (in Norwegian)	Number of representatives
Labour Party (Arbeiderpartiet)	5
Local List(s) (Lokale lister)	10
Total number of members:	15

Tjeldsund herredsstyre 1955–1959
Party name (in Norwegian)	Number of representatives
Labour Party (Arbeiderpartiet)	6
Local List(s) (Lokale lister)	9
Total number of members:	15

Tjeldsund herredsstyre 1951–1955
Party name (in Norwegian)	Number of representatives
Labour Party (Arbeiderpartiet)	3
Joint List(s) of Non-Socialist Parties (Borgerlige Felleslister)	8
Local List(s) (Lokale lister)	1
Total number of members:	12

Tjeldsund herredsstyre 1947–1951
Party name (in Norwegian)	Number of representatives
Labour Party (Arbeiderpartiet)	4
Joint List(s) of Non-Socialist Parties (Borgerlige Felleslister)	7
Local List(s) (Lokale lister)	1
Total number of members:	12

Tjeldsund herredsstyre 1945–1947
Party name (in Norwegian)	Number of representatives
Labour Party (Arbeiderpartiet)	3
Joint List(s) of Non-Socialist Parties (Borgerlige Felleslister)	9
Total number of members:	12

Tjeldsund herredsstyre 1937–1941*
Party name (in Norwegian)	Number of representatives
Labour Party (Arbeiderpartiet)	4
Joint List(s) of Non-Socialist Parties (Borgerlige Felleslister)	7
Local List(s) (Lokale lister)	1
Total number of members:	12
Note: Due to the German occupation of Norway during World War II, no elections were held for new municipal councils until after the war ended in 1945.

=== Mayors ===
The mayor (Norwegian: ordfører) of Tjeldsund Municipality is the political leader of the municipality and the chairperson of the municipal council. Here is a list of people who have held this position:

- 1909–1919: Johannes E.S. Olsen
- 1920–1922: Eilert Fjelddahl
- 1923–1928: Andreas Tønder Wiken
- 1929–1931: Olaus T. Krosshamn
- 1932–1971: Arne Wisthus (LL)
- 1972–1983: Odd R. Stokke (LL)
- 1984–1993: Geir Halvorsen (Ap)
- 1993–1999: Gunnhill Andreassen (LL)
- 1999–2000: Gunnar Flygel (LL)
- 2000–2015: Bjørnar O. Pettersen (H)
- 2015–2019: Liv Kristin Johnsen (H)
- 2019–2023: Helene Berg Nilsen (Ap)
- 2023–present: Robin Ridderseth (LL)

== Notable people ==
- Bjarne Berg-Sæther (1919 in Tjeldsund – 2009), a politician who was mayor of Sandtorg Municipality from 1947–1963 and mayor of Harstad Municipality from 1963-1967
