= Ramsund, Norway =

Village in Tjeldsund Municipality, Norway

Ramsund
- Village
- Interactive map of Ramsund
- Location within Troms Location within Norway
- Coordinates: 68.4920°N 16.5184°E
- Country: Norway
- Region: Northern Norway
- County: Troms
- District: Ofoten
- Municipality: Tjeldsund Municipality

Area
  - Total: 0.6 km^{2} (0.23 sq mi)
- Elevation: 15 m (49 ft)

Population (2022)
  - Total: 318
  - Density: 530/km^{2} (1,400/sq mi)
- Time zone: UTC+01:00 (CET)
  - Summer (DST): UTC+02:00 (CEST)
- Post Code: 9442 Ramsund

Ramsund is a village in Tjeldsund Municipality in Troms county, Norway. The village is located on the eastern shore of the Ramsundet strait, just south of the Ramsund Bridge. The 0.6-square-kilometre (150-acre) village has a population (2022) of 318 and a population density of 530 inhabitants per square kilometre (1,400/sq mi).

Ramsund Chapel is located in this village. The main Norwegian Naval base for the north is located south of the village and is the home for the Marinejegerkommandoen unit.

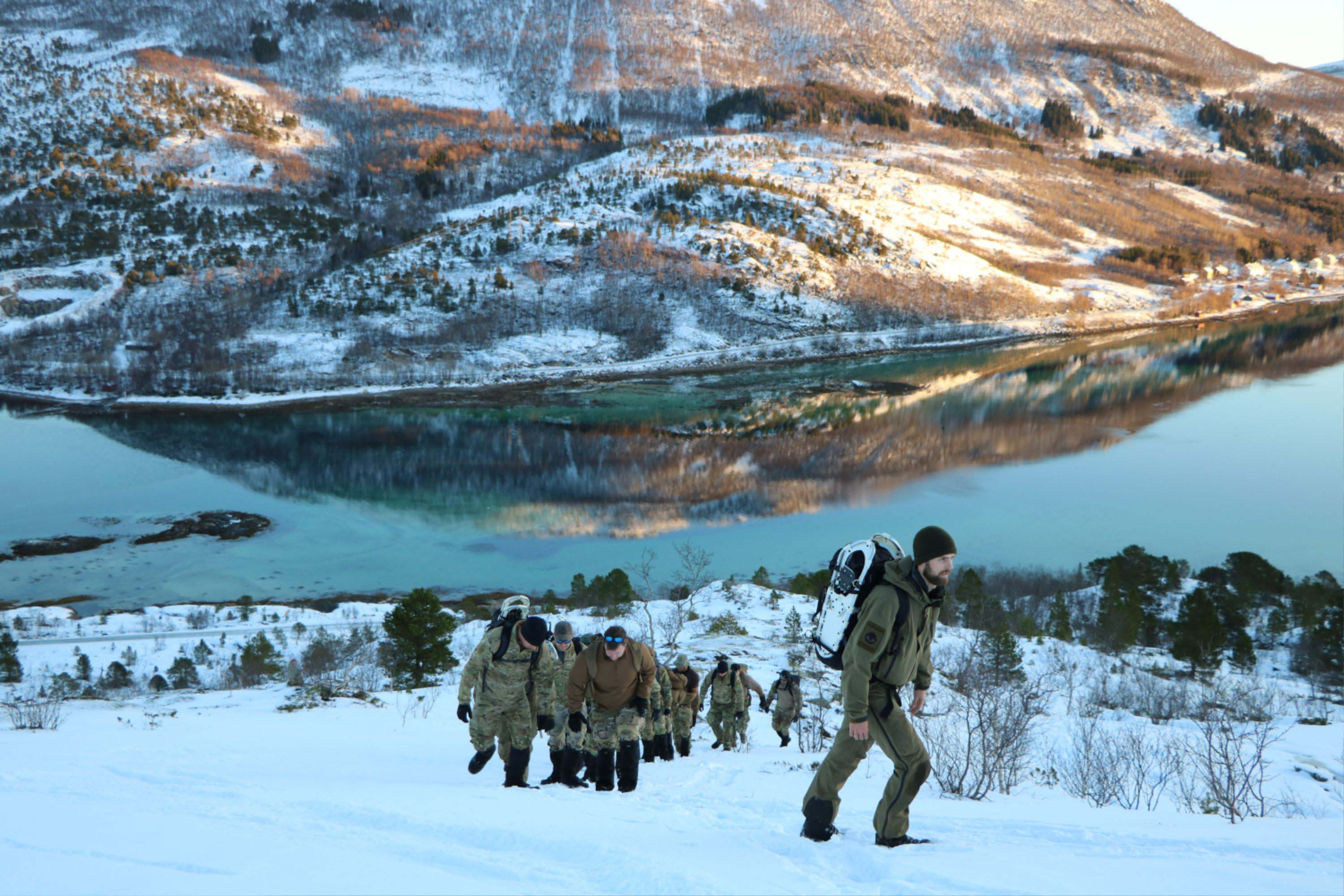
Norwegian Navy and US Navy personnel in the hills above Ramsund in Feb 2017

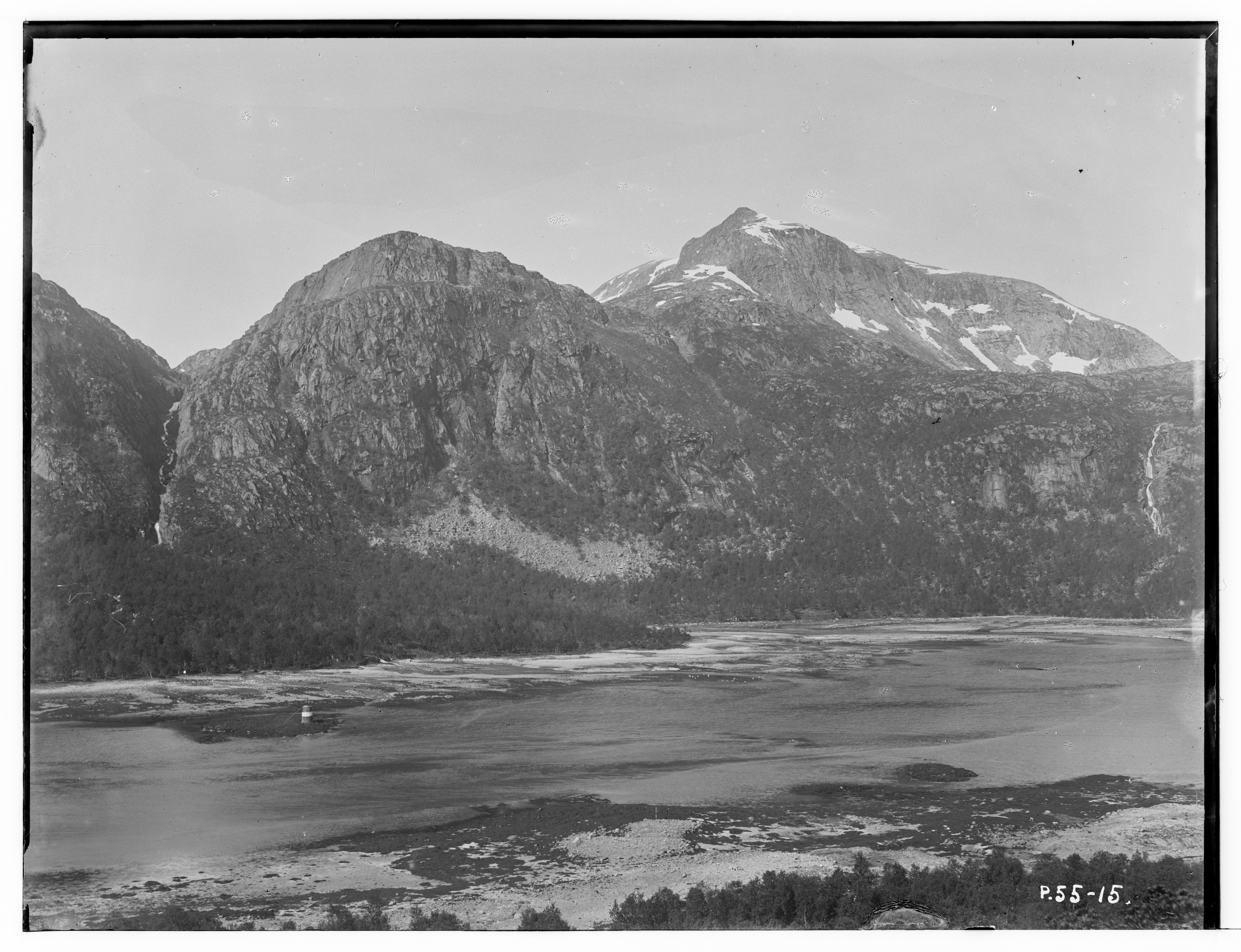
Historical image of Ramsundet strait, taken 1900-1910
