= Tovika =

Village in Tjeldsund Municipality, Norway

Tovika (Norwegian); Tuviika (Northern Sami); Tovik (Norwegian)
- Village
- Interactive map of: Tovika (Norwegian); Tuviika (Northern Sami)
- Location within Troms Location within Norway
- Coordinates: 68°40′45″N 16°52′10″E
- Country: Norway
- Region: Northern Norway
- County: Troms
- District: Central Hålogaland
- Municipality: Tjeldsund Municipality

Area
  - Total: 0.54 km^{2} (0.21 sq mi)
- Elevation: 14 m (46 ft)

Population (2005)
  - Total: 200
  - Density: 370/km^{2} (960/sq mi)
- Time zone: UTC+01:00 (CET)
  - Summer (DST): UTC+02:00 (CEST)
- Post Code: 9445 Tovik

Tovika or Tovik (Norwegian) or Tuviika (Northern Sami) is a village in Tjeldsund Municipality in Troms county, Norway. The village is located on the mainland at the entrance of the two fjords; Astafjorden and Vågsfjorden, and at a distance of about 35 kilometres (22 mi) from Harstad/Narvik Airport, Evenes.

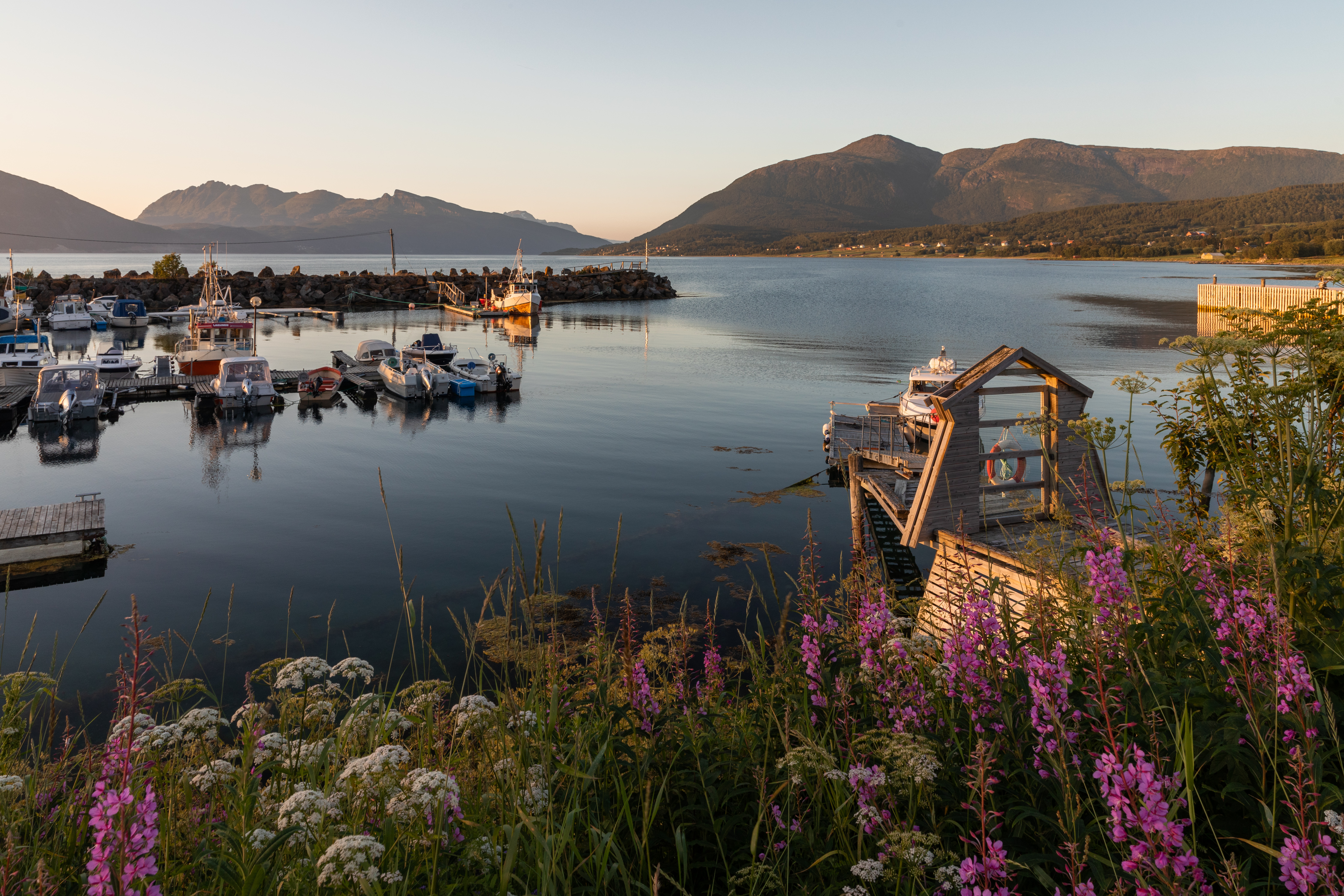
View of Tovik by the fjords

A characteristic feature of this village is the curved mole (or breakwater) which accommodates smaller vessels, as well as a pier for guest boats. There is also a gas/petrol station which provides for general groceries. Tovik Church was built in 1905 to serve that part of the municipality.

The 0.54-square-kilometre (130-acre) village had a population (2005) of 200 and a population density of 370 inhabitants per square kilometre (960/sq mi). Since 2005, the population and area data for this village area has not been separately tracked by Statistics Norway.
