= Tjeldsundet =

Strait in Northern Norway

- Dielddanuorri (Northern Sami)
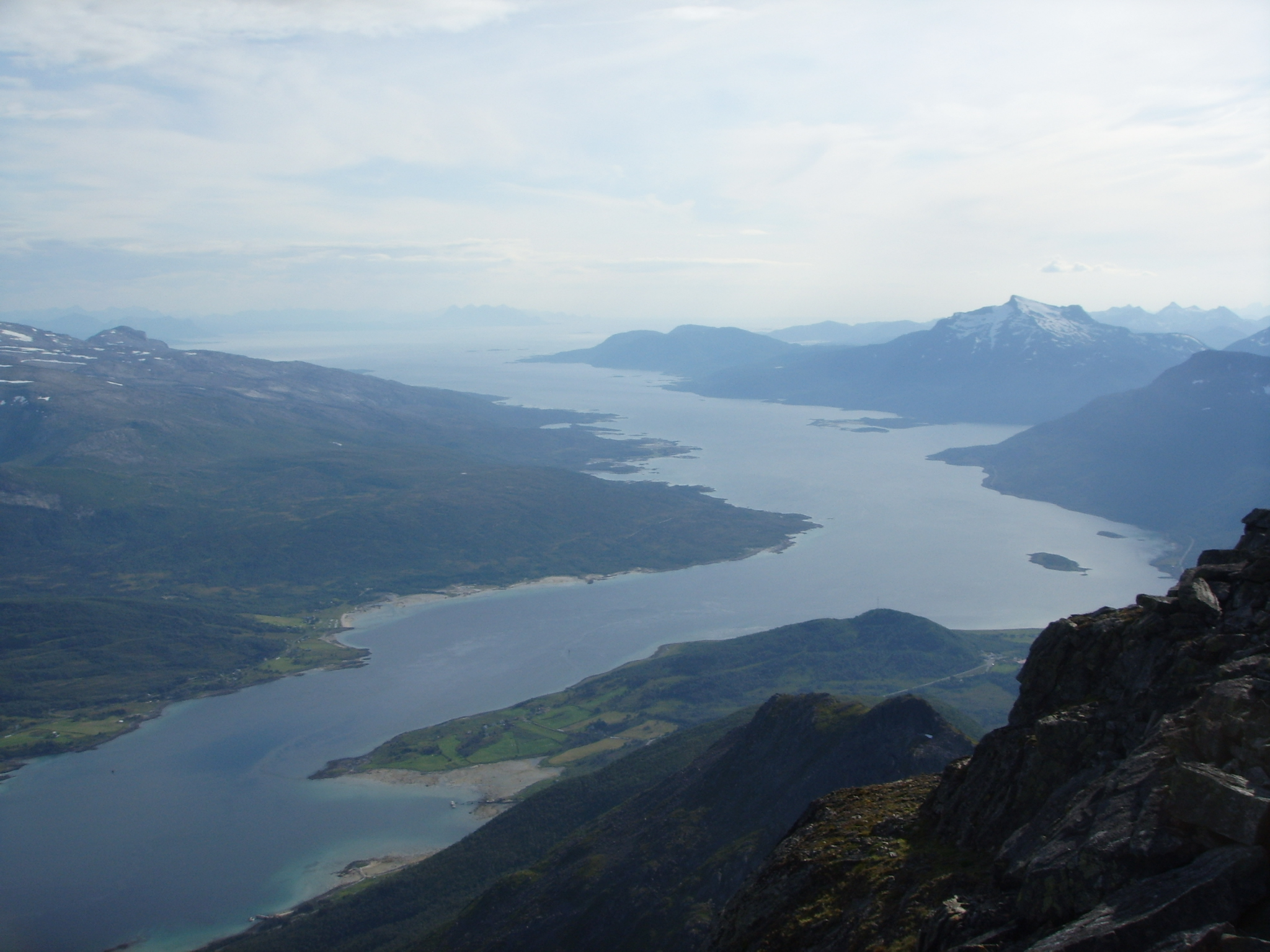
- View of part of Tjeldsundet seen from Sætertind looking south
- Interactive map of the fjord
- Location: Troms and Nordland, Norway
- Coordinates: 68.5910°N 16.5336°E
- Type: Fjord
- Basin countries: Norway
- Max. length: 50 kilometres (31 mi)

Tjeldsundet (Norwegian; Northern Sami: Dielddanuorri) is a strait in Northern Norway. The 50-kilometre (27 nmi; 31 mi) long strait is located between the island of Hinnøya and mainland Norway in its northern part and between Hinnøya and the island of Tjeldøya in its southern part. Tjeldsundet has been an important waterway for more than 1,000 years and was well known and used during the Viking Age.

The northern part is in Troms county between Harstad Municipality and Tjeldsund Municipality, while the southern part forms the border between Troms and Nordland counties between Tjeldsund Municipality and Lødingen Municipality. The southern entrance to the strait begins at the Ofotfjorden at the village of Lødingen and the town of Harstad is located at the northern entrance of the strait where it empties into the Vågsfjorden.

The Tjeldsund Bridge connects Hinnøya to the mainland by the E10 road, also known as King Olav's Road (Norwegian: Kong Olavs vei), part of which goes from the town of Harstad to Harstad/Narvik Airport, Evenes.

== Media gallery ==
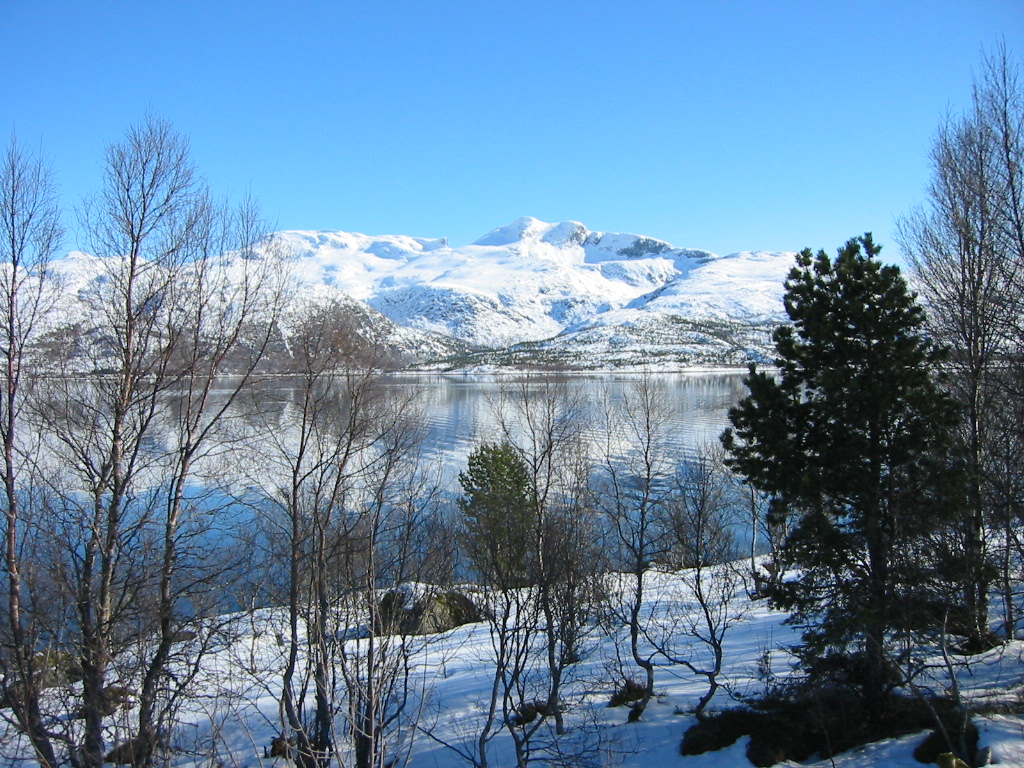
Southern part of Tjeldsundet looking east towards the mountainous Tjeldøya

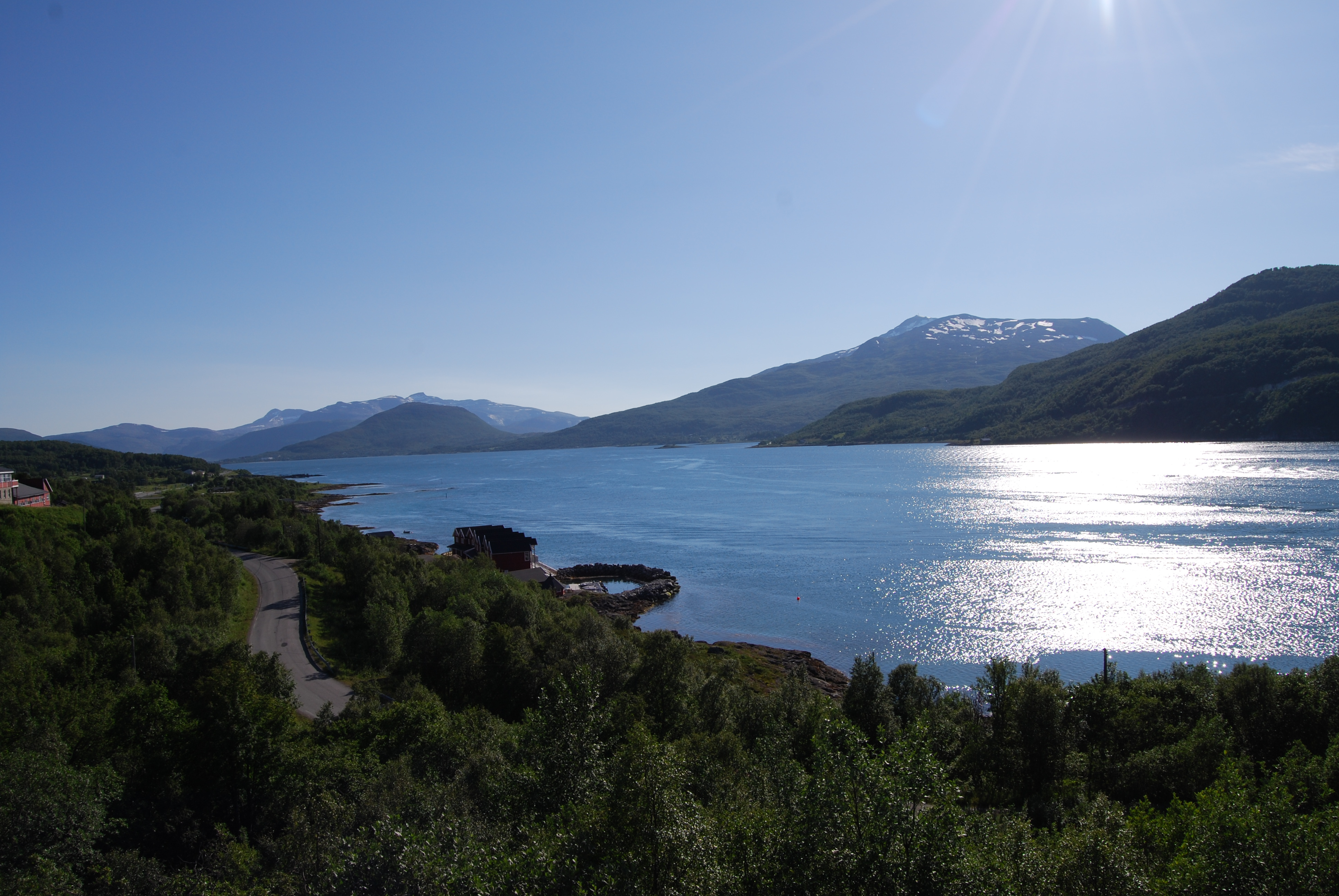
Lavansfjorden, a branch of Tjeldsundet, Tjeldsund Municipality

Tjeldsund bridge over the Tjeldsundet

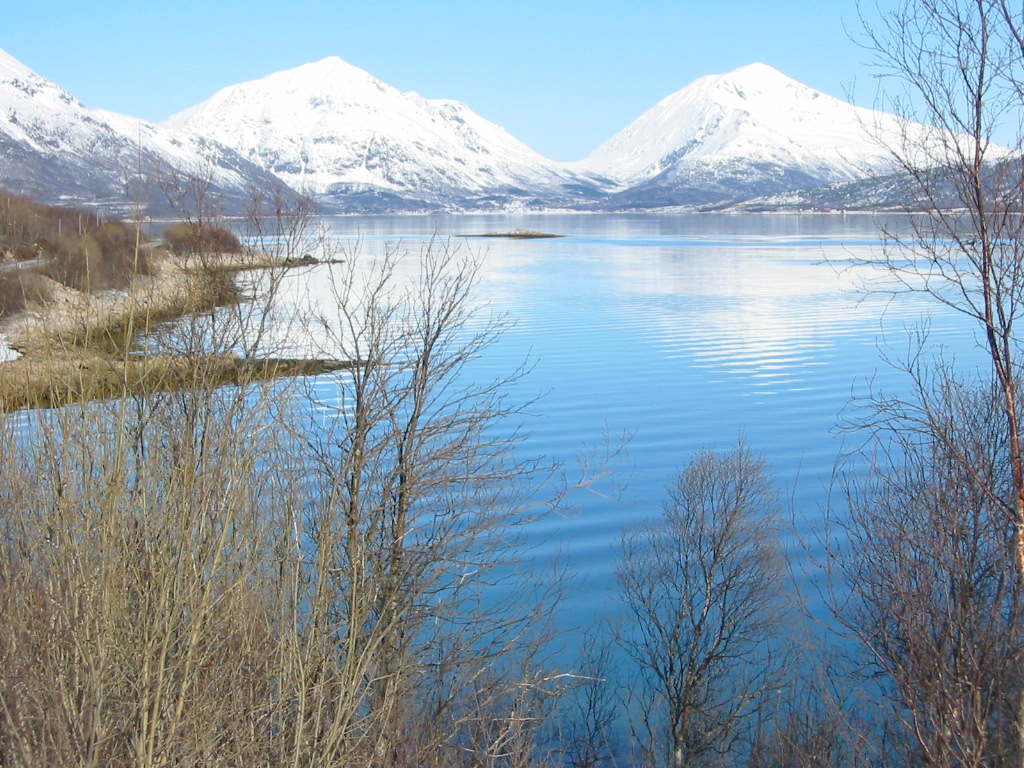
View looking north into the Tjeldsundet strait
