= Evenskjer =

Village in Tjeldsund Municipality, Norway

Evenskjer: Evenskjer (Norwegian); Skánik (Northern Sami); Skearri (Northern Sami); Viervá (Northern Sami)
- Village
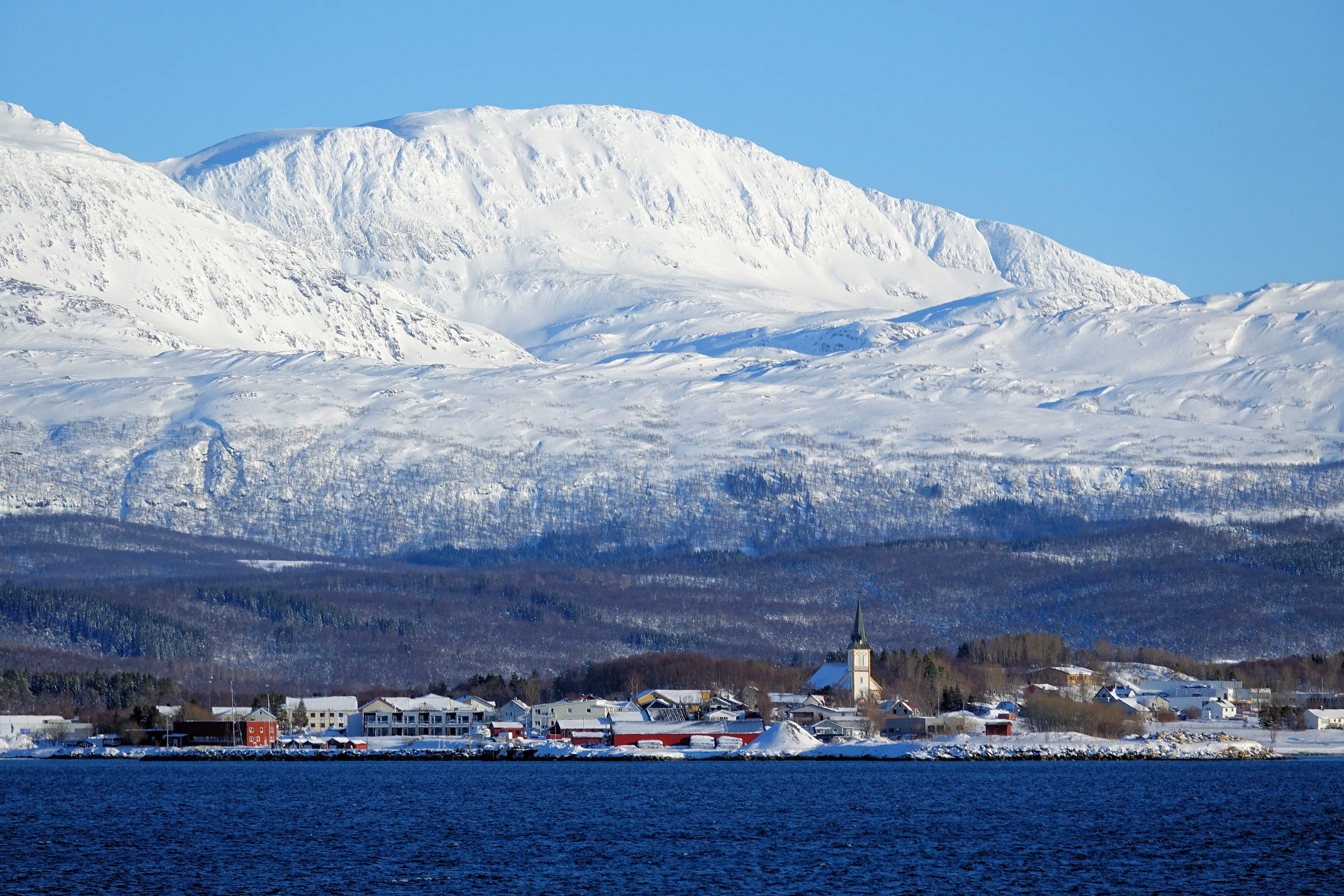
- View of the village
- Interactive map of Evenskjer
- Location within Troms Location within Norway
- Coordinates: 68°35′05″N 16°34′31″E
- Country: Norway
- Region: Northern Norway
- County: Troms
- District: Central Hålogaland
- Municipality: Tjeldsund Municipality

Area
  - Total: 0.86 km^{2} (0.33 sq mi)
- Elevation: 6 m (20 ft)

Population (2023)
  - Total: 822
  - Density: 956/km^{2} (2,480/sq mi)
- Time zone: UTC+01:00 (CET)
  - Summer (DST): UTC+02:00 (CEST)
- Post Code: 9440 Evenskjer

Evenskjer (Norwegian) or Skánik, Skearri, Viervá (Northern Sami) is the administrative centre of Tjeldsund Municipality in Troms county, Norway. The village is located along the Tjeldsundet strait about 25 km (16 mi) south of the town of Harstad. European route E10 passes just to the north of the village of Evenskjer. The 0.86-square-kilometre (210-acre) village has a population (2023) of 822 and a population density of 956 inhabitants per square kilometre (2,480/sq mi).

Skånland Church, one of Northern Norway's largest wooden churches, is located in Evenskjer. There are also two schools located in the village, Soltun and Skånland.

== Etymology ==
Evenskjer was originally called Skånland. Its present name derives from a small settlement that developed on the headland now known as Skjærran (meaning “the rocks” or “the reef”), where a post office and a steamship landing were established.
