= Lavangen =

Lavangen may refer to:

== Places ==
- Lavangen Municipality, a municipality in Troms county, Norway
- Lavangen (fjord), a fjord in Troms county, Norway
- Lavangen Church, a church in Lavangen Municipality in Troms county, Norway
- Lavangen, Tjeldsund, a village in Tjeldsund Municipality in Troms county, Norway

== Other ==
- Lavangen IF, a sports club based in Lavangen Municipality in Troms county, Norway
