= Isogaisa Festival =

The Isogaisa Festival started in 2009 and is an annual festival and in 2014 is celebrating its 5th anniversary. Isogaisa is the only shamanic festival in the northern part of Scandinavia and have participants from all parts of Sápmi (Sweden, Norway, Finland, Russia) as from other European countries. The festival runs for a week starting with lectures, workshops and nature walks from Monday until Thursday and then has its main events during the weekend. Another festival in this area of Norway is Riddu Riđđu that is similar in the way that it has a focus on Sami culture and connection to other indigenous people but is without the focus on shamanism, traditional beliefs and practices.

== About ==
The festival is run by the organization Isogaisa with Ronald Kvernmo as its director. Kvernmo is a member of the Sami community and is an author, cultural worker and shamanic practitioner who both studied Sami religion academically at University of Tromsø and attended the Saivo Sjamanskole run by author and shaman Ailo Gaup.

Isogaisa is described as a social meeting place where different cultures blend. The old Sami spiritual way of seeing the world is combined with modern ways of thinking. Events of ceremonies, lectures, music/dance/theater performances are held where indigenous people present their own culture and practices and then take part in performances of other groups. While Sámi and traditional Norse shamanism are central to the festival, it also brings in practitioners of other shamanistic traditions.

As using alcohol and other substances to alter consciousness never have been the way of traditional Sami shamanism, according to the official webpage, the festival has a very strict no drugs policy. This means in practice that if a participant enter the festival under the influence of anything stronger than coffee they will be asked to leave, festival band taken of them without any refund and not allowed back for a 10-year period. Another reason for not allowing any drugs is that all members, young and old, should feel comfortable to attend.

The creation of this event is important for the spread of information regarding the situation for indigenous cultures around the world and their struggle for survival in the contemporary world. The sharing of information between cultures creates a connection between people from all parts of the world and helps support them in the keeping and renewal of customs that for many years have suffered religious persecution. To be able to socially connect and create networks have helped communities to gain support and communicate information that is otherwise unavailable for the public.

The Isogaisa Festival have brought up many relevant questions for shamanic practice and culture and has been shown support from the Sami Parliament of Norway, the Cultural Council and the organization of shamans in Norway.

Isogaisa 2014, 10–17 August, will have a focus on traditional ways of healing in comparison to modern medicine. Shamans and western medicinal professionals will give lectures: May Shamanism contribute to care and treatment? Is it possible to combine healing with modern medicine? What is superstition and what is true?

== Location ==
This festival is located in the village of Tennevoll in Lavangen Municipality in northern Norway. It is situated in the surroundings of a hotel named Fjellkysten. The hotel is on a slope down towards the fjord of Lavangen. Inside the hotel there is a reception where you can receive information about the festival, meet other participants and buy a meal or coffee in the restaurant. During the main days of the festival the space opens up for people to sell their crafts, advertise and perform healing or readings of different kinds and socially interact in between events. Outside the hotel is also an area for vending and as you move further back you enter the place for camping and events.

On the field in the back of the hotel a large octagon is constructed each year, centered around a sacred fireplace, and in addition a lavvu is placed in each of the four corners to give space for workshops, lectures and ceremonies. Each lavvu has its own fireplace and can be closed off from the main center. For the bigger ceremonies and events the whole space is opened up for participants. Its estimated that the space could hold 400 people. There are also separated lavvus that can hold smaller gatherings for the same cause that are placed around the area. There is a building plan of creating a more permanent structure that could hold between 500 and 800 people and be used all round the year.

As the festival is located in a remote location the number of participants is estimated to keep low but the effect of the event is spread through social media like Facebook groups and other web-based platforms.

== Events ==
As Isogaisa is a shamanic gathering it includes many different expressions of culture and spirituality. Artists, shamans, cultural workers and healers are either invited or express their own wish to participate in the event through contact with the Isogaisa board who are working with the organization of the festival. People with roots in Canada, Mexico, New Zealand, Russia, the Nordic countries and many other places travel to share their knowledge and to learn from each other.

== Camping and Lodging ==
There is a possibility to rent rooms at Fjellkysten but camping is also available for camper vans, tents and lavvus in a back area. Another possibility is sleeping inside the main lavvu but be prepared that people will gather at all hours of the night with drums, chants and conversations. Camping, or sleeping in the main lavvu, is included in the price of the festival. Booking of rooms at Fjellkysten is made by contacting them directly and if additional sleeping arrangements is needed its best to contact the management of the festival through their webpage.
