= Soløy =

Village in Lavangen Municipality, Norway

Soløy (Norwegian); Suolemak (Northern Sami)
- Village
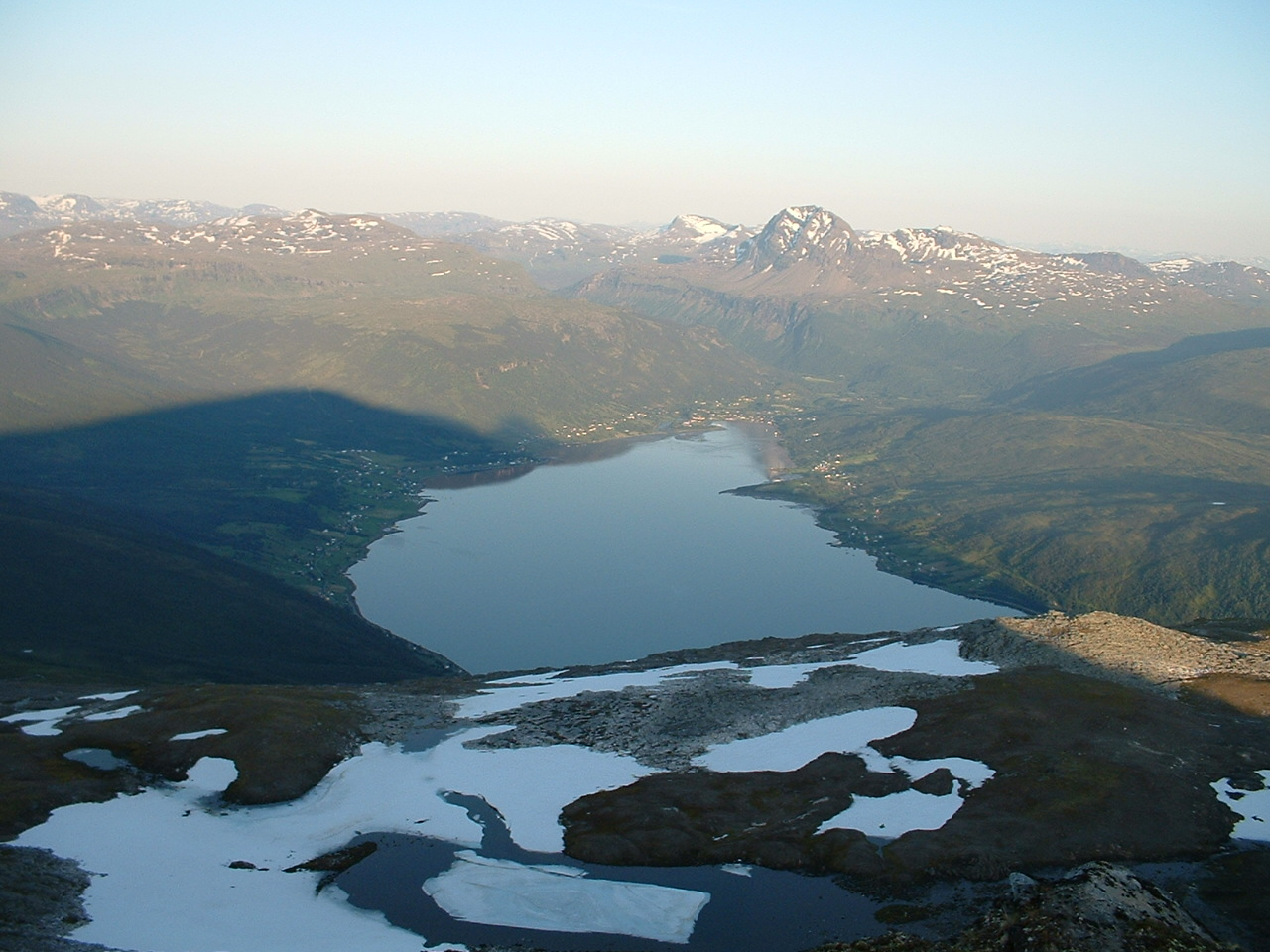
- View of the village on the left side of the fjord
- Interactive map of: Soløy (Norwegian); Suolemak (Northern Sami)
- Location within Troms Location within Norway
- Coordinates: 68.77461°N 17.80085°E
- Country: Norway
- Region: Northern Norway
- County: Troms
- District: Hålogaland
- Municipality: Lavangen Municipality
- Elevation: 19 m (62 ft)
- Time zone: UTC+01:00 (CET)
  - Summer (DST): UTC+02:00 (CEST)
- Post Code: 9357 Tennevoll

Soløy (Norwegian) or Suolemak (Northern Sami) is a village in Lavangen Municipality in Troms county, Norway. The village is located on the eastern shore of the Lavangen fjord, about 4 kilometres (2.5 mi) north of the administrative centre of Tennevoll and about 52 kilometres (32 mi) east of the town of Harstad. The small village of Å lies immediately north of Soløy, forming one large village area through conurbation.

Lavangen Church is located in the southern part of the village. Historically, the village of Soløy was the administrative centre of Lavangen Municipality, from 1907 when the municipality was established until 1964 when it was merged into Salangen Municipality. On 1 January 1977, Lavangen Municipality was re-established and Tennevoll was chosen as the new administrative centre instead of Soløy.
