= Lavangen Church =

- Lavangen kirke
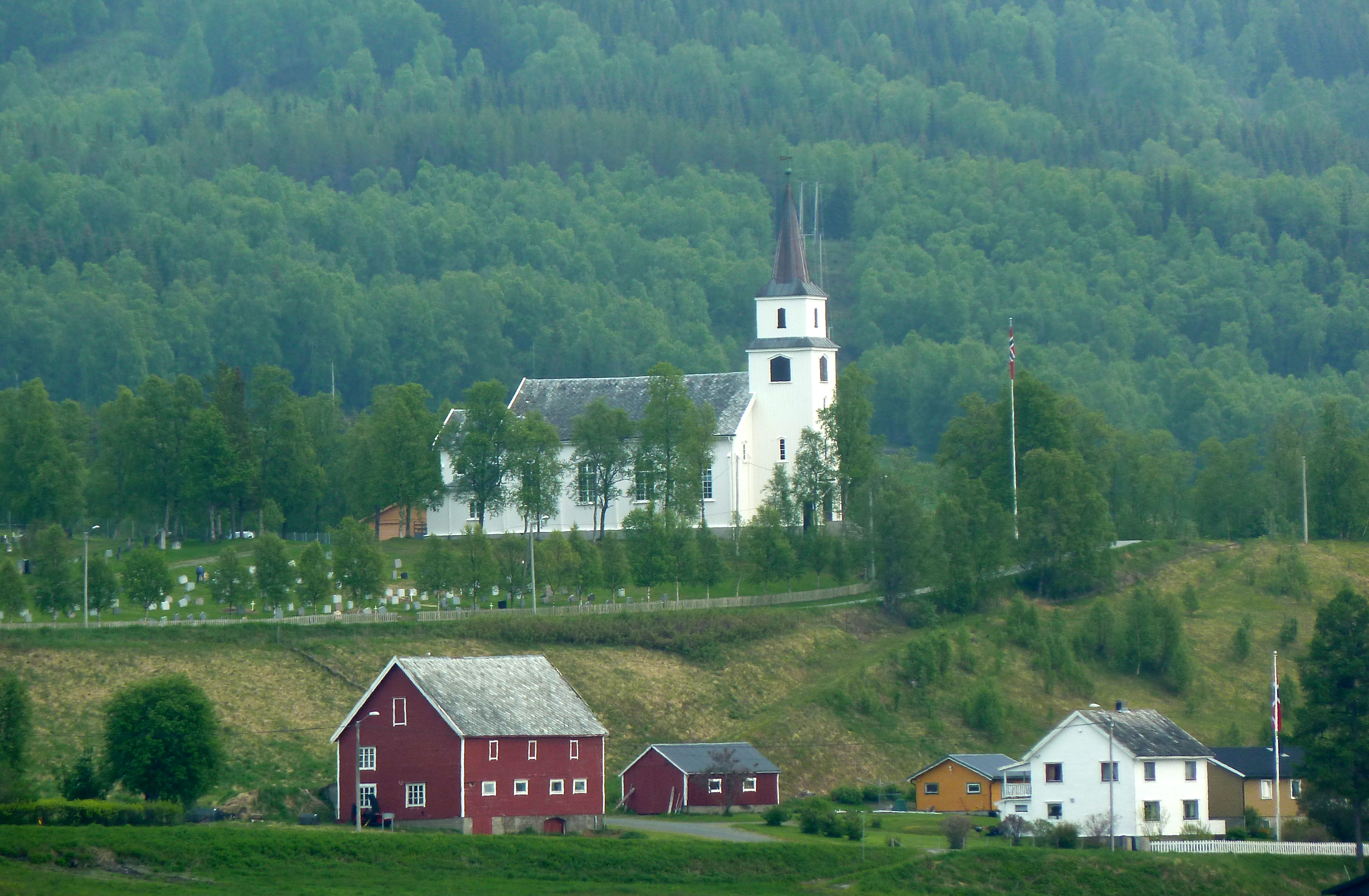
- View of the church
- Lavangen Church
- 68.772049°N 17.801718°E
- Location: Lavangen Municipality, Troms
- Country: Norway
- Denomination: Church of Norway
- Churchmanship: Evangelical Lutheran

History
- Status: Parish church
- Founded: 1891
- Consecrated: 1891

Architecture
- Functional status: Active
- Architect: Jacob Wilhelm Nordan
- Architectural type: Long church
- Completed: 1891 (135 years ago)

Specifications
- Capacity: 360
- Materials: Wood

Administration
- Diocese: Nord-Hålogaland
- Deanery: Senja prosti
- Parish: Lavangen
- Norwegian Cultural Heritage Site
- Type: Church
- Status: Listed
- ID: 84915

Lavangen Church (Norwegian: Lavangen kirke) is a parish church of the Church of Norway in Lavangen Municipality in Troms county, Norway. It is located in the village of Å, in an area called Soløy, just north of Hesjevika. It is the church for the Lavangen parish which is part of the Senja prosti (deanery) in the Diocese of Nord-Hålogaland. The white, wooden church was built in a long church style in 1891 using plans drawn up by the architect Jacob Wilhelm Nordan. The church seats about 420 people.

== Media gallery ==
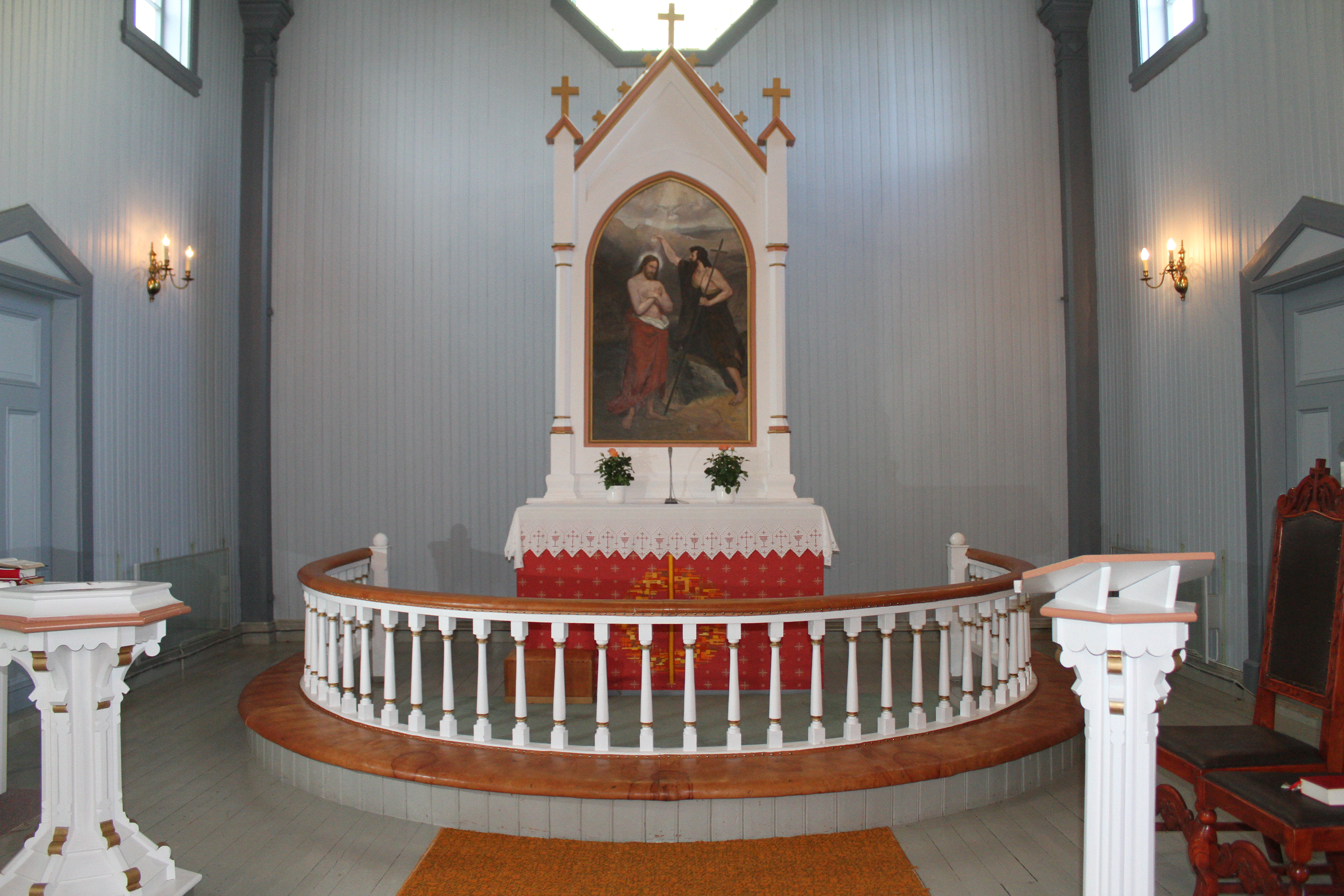

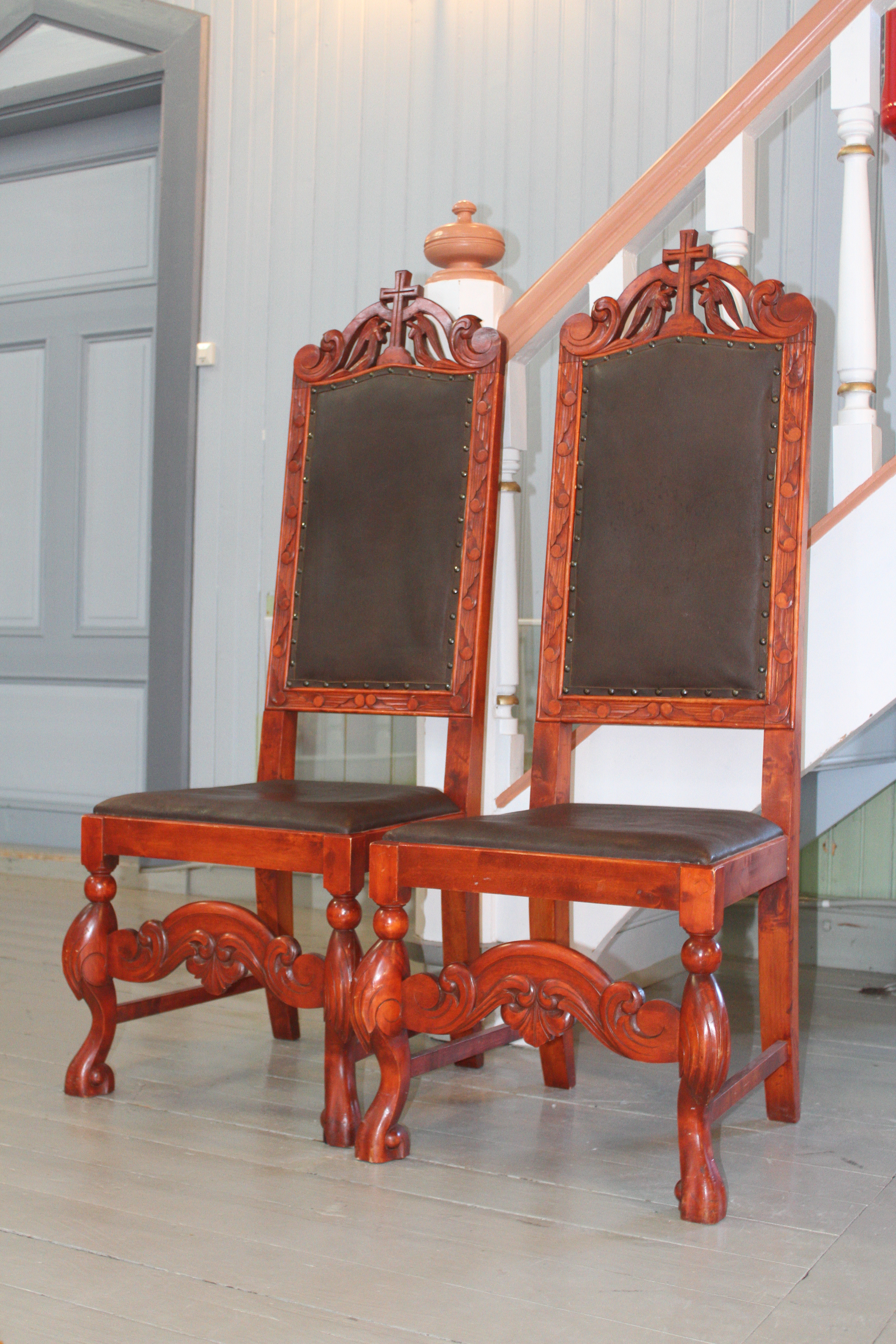

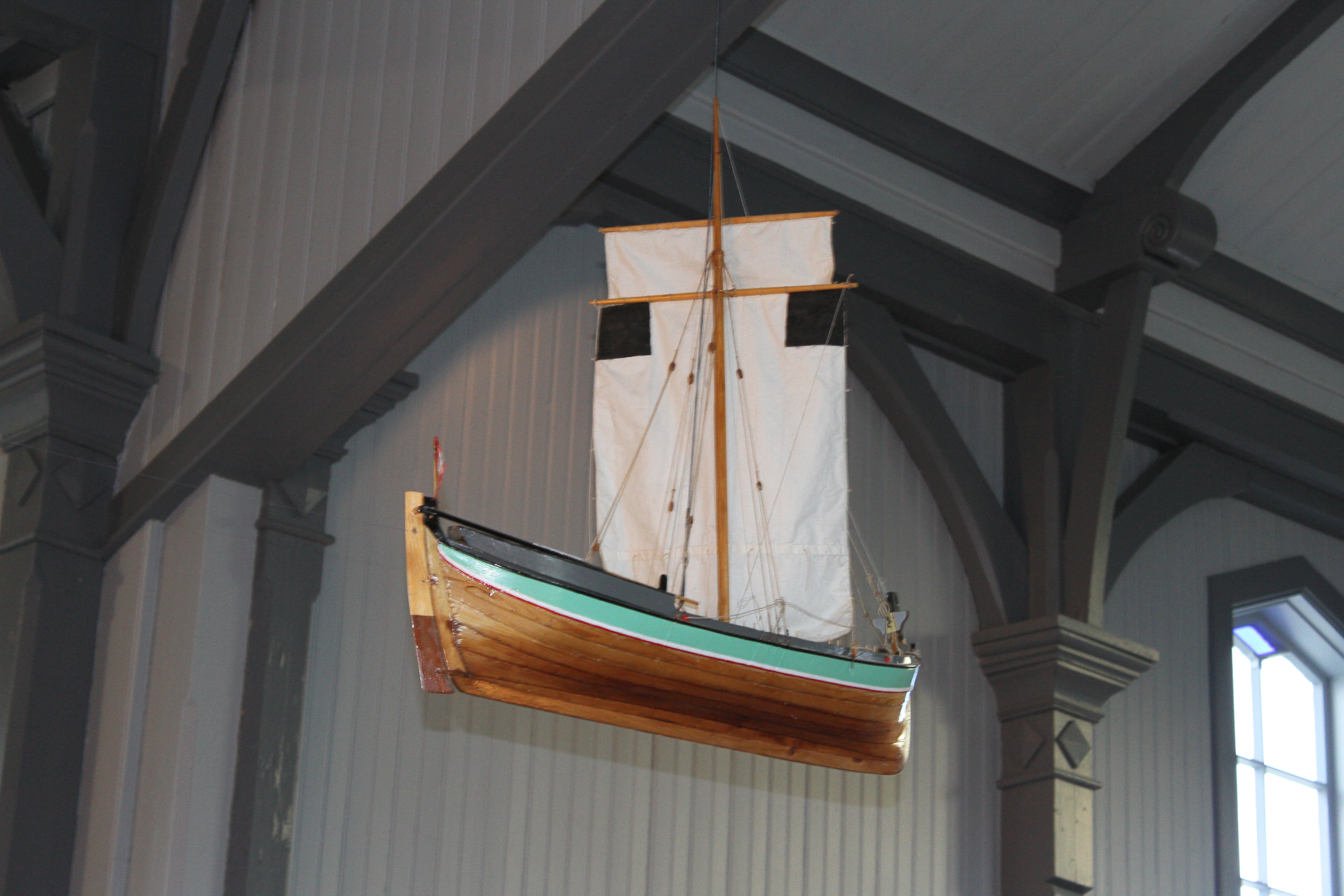

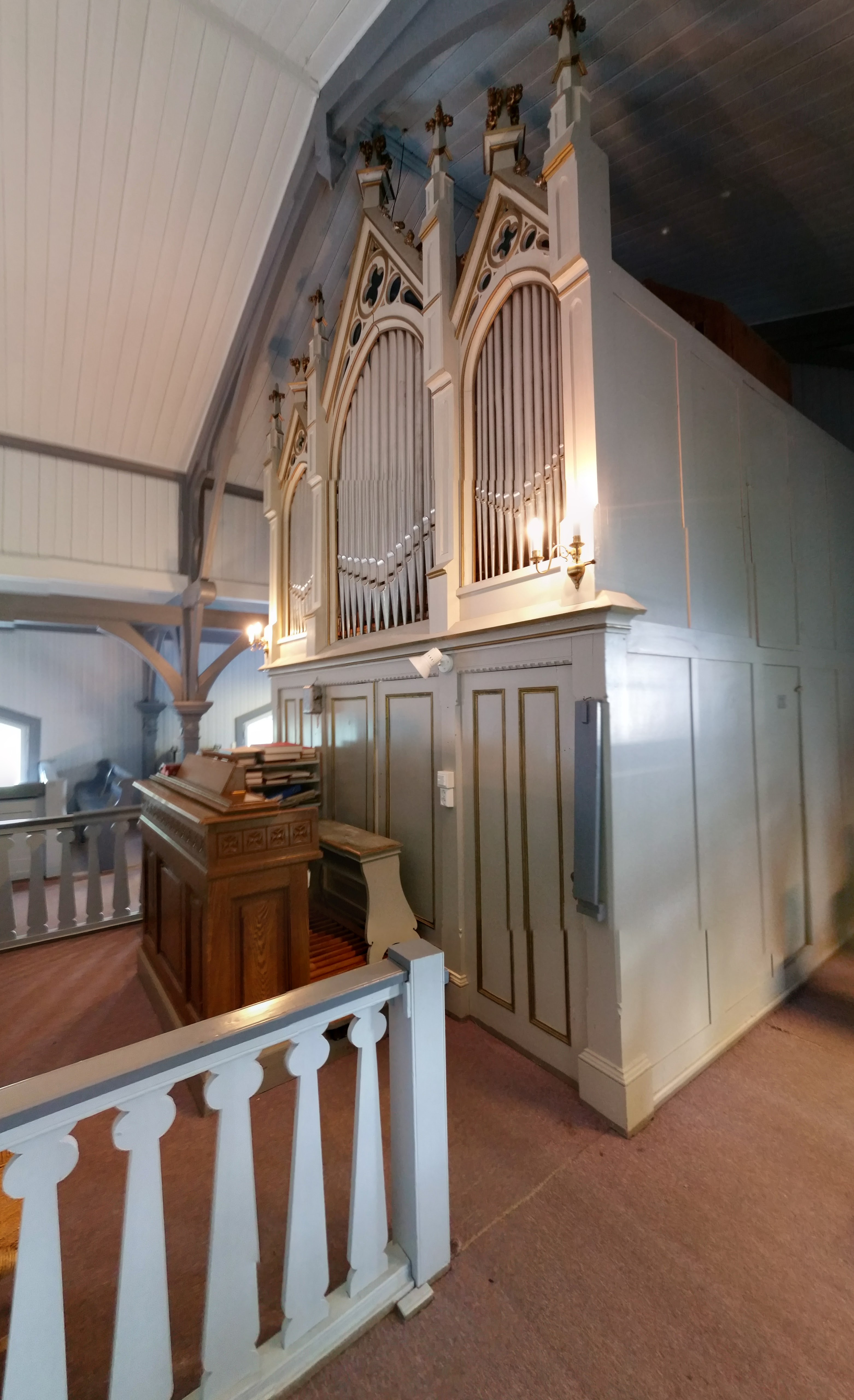

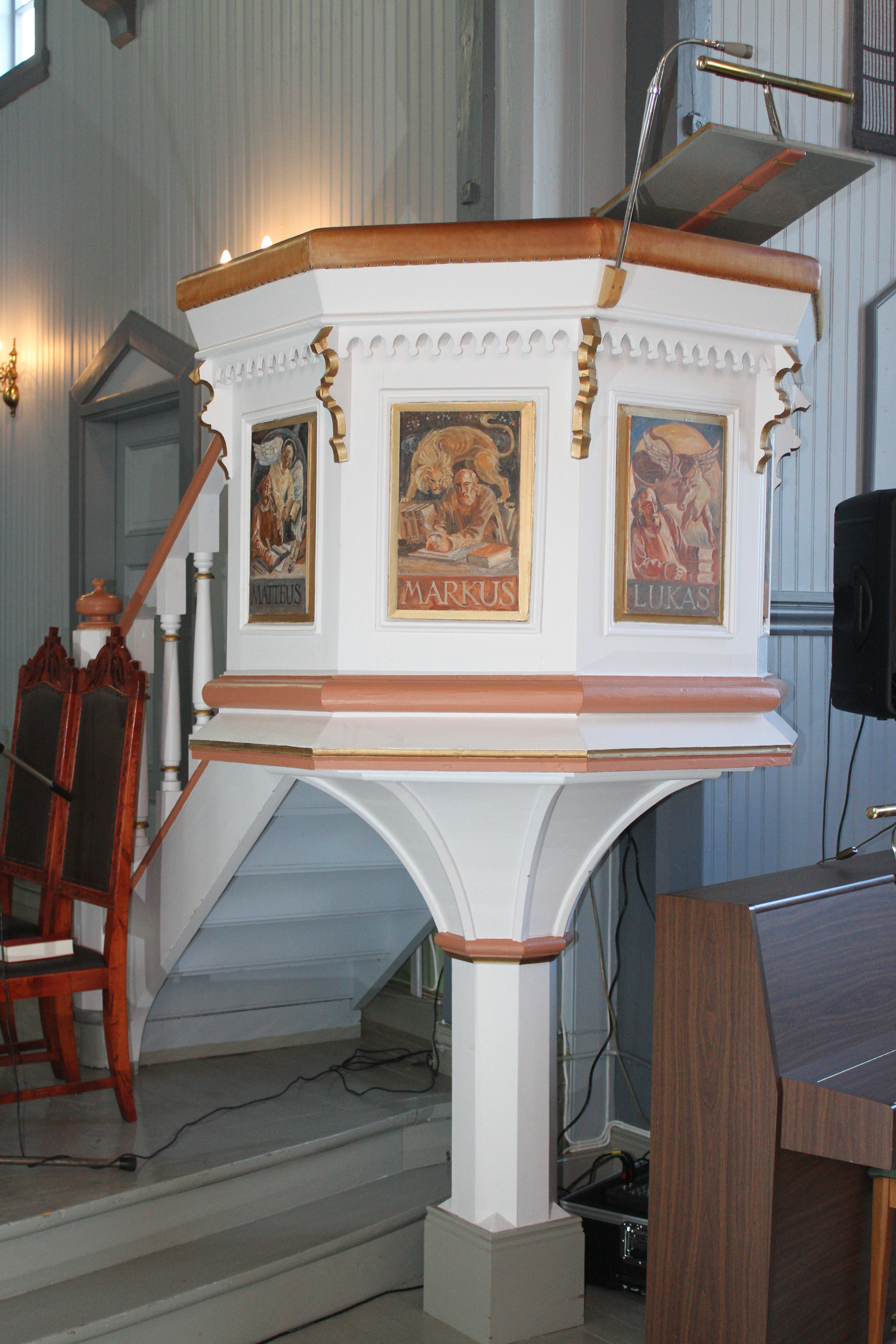

== See also ==
- List of churches in Nord-Hålogaland
