= Å, Lavangen =

Village in Lavangen Municipality, Norway

Å (Norwegian); Oavák (Northern Sami)
- Village
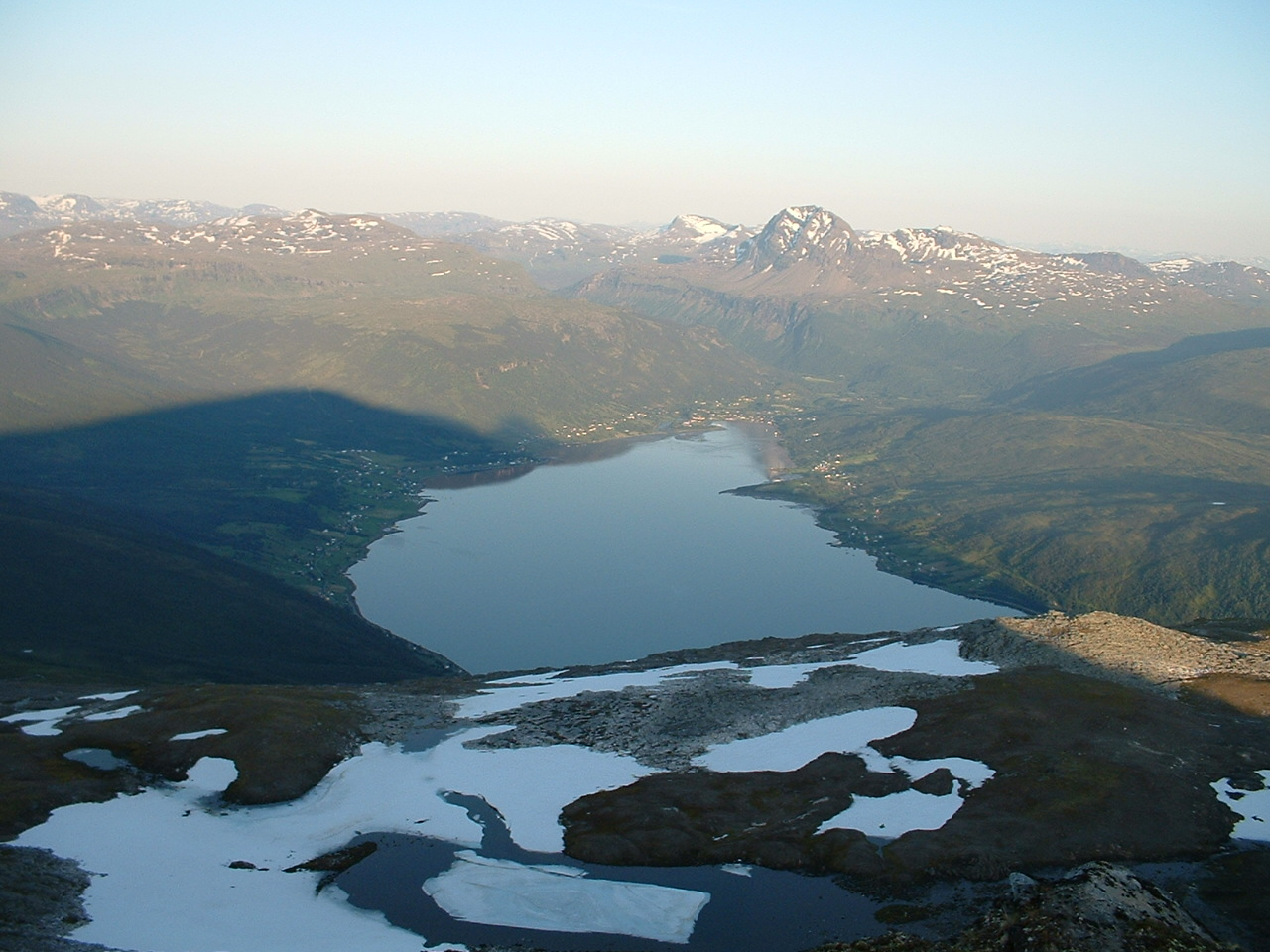
- View of the village (left side of the fjord)
- Interactive map of: Å (Norwegian); Oavák (Northern Sami)
- Location within Troms Location within Norway
- Coordinates: 68°47′02″N 17°46′54″E
- Country: Norway
- Region: Northern Norway
- County: Troms
- District: Hålogaland
- Municipality: Lavangen Municipality
- Elevation: 15 m (49 ft)
- Time zone: UTC+01:00 (CET)
  - Summer (DST): UTC+02:00 (CEST)
- Post Code: 9357 Tennevoll

Å (Norwegian) or Oavák (Northern Sami) is a village in Lavangen Municipality in Troms county, Norway. The village is located along the eastern shore of the Lavangen fjord, about 4 kilometres (2.5 mi) north of the administrative centre of Tennevoll and about 52 kilometres (32 mi) east of the town of Harstad. The village of Soløy lies immediately south of Å, forming one large village area through conurbation. The population (2001) of the village was 79.

== Name ==
The village (originally a farm) was first mentioned in 1610 ("Aa"). The name is from Old Norse á, which means "(small) river".

== See also ==
- the village of Å in Ibestad Municipality in Troms county, Norway
- the village of Å in Senja Municipality in Troms county, Norway
