= Lavangen Municipality =

Municipality in Troms, Norway

Lavangen Municipality Lavangen kommune Loabága suohkan
- Municipality
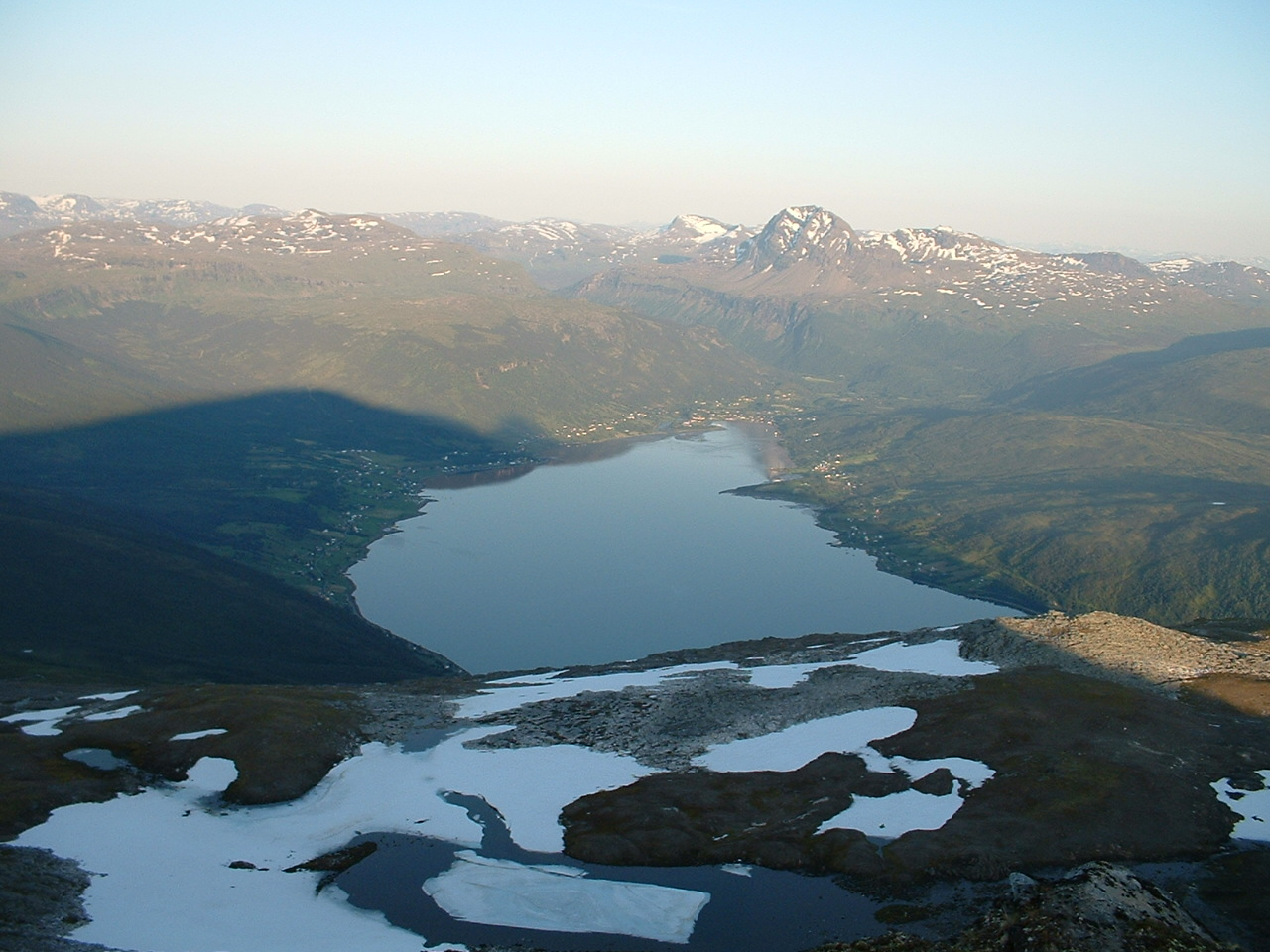
- View of Inner Lavangen

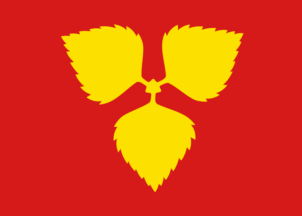
- Flag Coat of arms

- Troms within Norway

- Lavangen within Troms
- Coordinates: 68°39′28″N 17°35′01″E
- Country: Norway
- County: Troms
- District: Midt-Troms
- Established: 1 January 1907
  - Preceded by: Ibestad Municipality
- Disestablished: 1 January 1964
  - Succeeded by: Salangen Municipality
- Re-established: 1 January 1977
  - Preceded by: Salangen Municipality
- Administrative centre: Tennevoll

Government
  - Mayor (2019): Hege Beathe Myrseth Rollmoen (Sp)

Area
  - Total: 301.62 km^{2} (116.46 sq mi)
  - Land: 296.07 km^{2} (114.31 sq mi)
  - Water: 5.55 km^{2} (2.14 sq mi) 1.8%
  - Rank: #266 in Norway
- Highest elevation: 1,457.49 m (4,781.8 ft)

Population (2024)
  - Total: 986
  - Rank: #335 in Norway
  - Density: 3.3/km^{2} (8.5/sq mi)
  - Change (10 years): ▼ −2.8%
- Demonym: Lavangsværing

Official language
  - Norwegian form: Neutral
- Time zone: UTC+01:00 (CET)
  - Summer (DST): UTC+02:00 (CEST)
- ISO 3166 code: NO-5518
- Website: Official website

Lavangen (Norwegian) or Loabák (Northern Sami) is a municipality in Troms county, Norway. The administrative centre of the municipality is the village of Tennevoll. Other villages in Lavangen include Fossbakken and Spansdalen (in the inland areas) and Kjeiprød, Røkenes, Låternes, Tennevoll, Hesjevika, Soløy, and Å (surrounding the fjord).

The 302-square-kilometre (117 sq mi) municipality is the 266th largest by area out of the 357 municipalities in Norway. Lavangen is the 335th most populous municipality in Norway with a population of 986. The municipality's population density is 3.3 inhabitants per square kilometre (8.5/sq mi) and its population has decreased by 2.8% over the previous 10-year period.

== General information ==
Lavangen was established on 1 January 1907 when it was separated from Ibestad Municipality. The initial population was 1,536. During the 1960s, there were many municipal mergers across Norway due to the work of the Schei Committee. On 1 January 1964, Lavangen Municipality (population: 1,677) and Salangen Municipality (population: 2,611) were merged into a new, larger Salangen Municipality. The merger was brief, however, because on 1 January 1977, the old Lavangen Municipality (except for the Lavangsnes area) was made a separate municipality once again.

On 1 January 2020, the municipality became part of the newly formed Troms og Finnmark county. Previously, it had been part of the old Troms county. On 1 January 2024, the Troms og Finnmark county was divided and the municipality once again became part of Troms county.

=== Name ===
The municipality is named after the local Lavangen fjord (Old Norse: Laufangr) since it is a central geographical feature of the area. The first element is lauf which means "leaf" (here in the sense of 'birchwood'). The last element is angr which means "fjord" or "bay". On 19 December 2015, the national government approved the municipality's request to add Loabák as a co-equal, official name of the municipality in the Northern Sami language. Both Loabák and Lavangen can be used interchangeably for the municipality. The spelling of the Sami language name changes depending on how it is used. It is called Loabák when it is spelled alone, but it is Loabága suohkan when using the Sami language equivalent to "Lavangen Municipality".

=== Coat of arms ===
The coat of arms was granted on 18 December 1987. The official blazon is "Gules, three birch leaves Or in pall stems conjoined" (Norwegian: I rødt tre gull bjørkeblad forent i trepass). This means the arms have a red field (background) and the charge is three birch leaves that are connected and in a Y-shape design. The leaves have a tincture of Or which means they are commonly colored yellow, but if it is made out of metal, then gold is used. The arms are a canting of the name of the municipality (which means leaf). The three leaves represent how the municipality was settled by Norwegians, Samis, and Kvens. The arms were designed by Øystein Hermod Skaugvolldal.

=== Churches ===
The Church of Norway has one parish (sokn) within Lavangen Municipality. It is part of the Indre Troms prosti (deanery) in the Diocese of Nord-Hålogaland.

Churches in Lavangen Municipality
Parish (sokn)	Church name	Location of the church	Year built
Lavangen	Lavangen Church	Soløy	1891

== Geography ==
The municipality encompasses the land around the Spansdalelva river valley and most of the area around the Lavangen fjord, south of the Astafjorden. The municipality borders Narvik Municipality (in Nordland county) to the south, Gratangen Municipality to the west, Salangen Municipality to the north, and Bardu Municipality to the east. The highest point in the municipality is the 1,457.49-metre (4,781.8 ft) tall mountain Spanstinden.

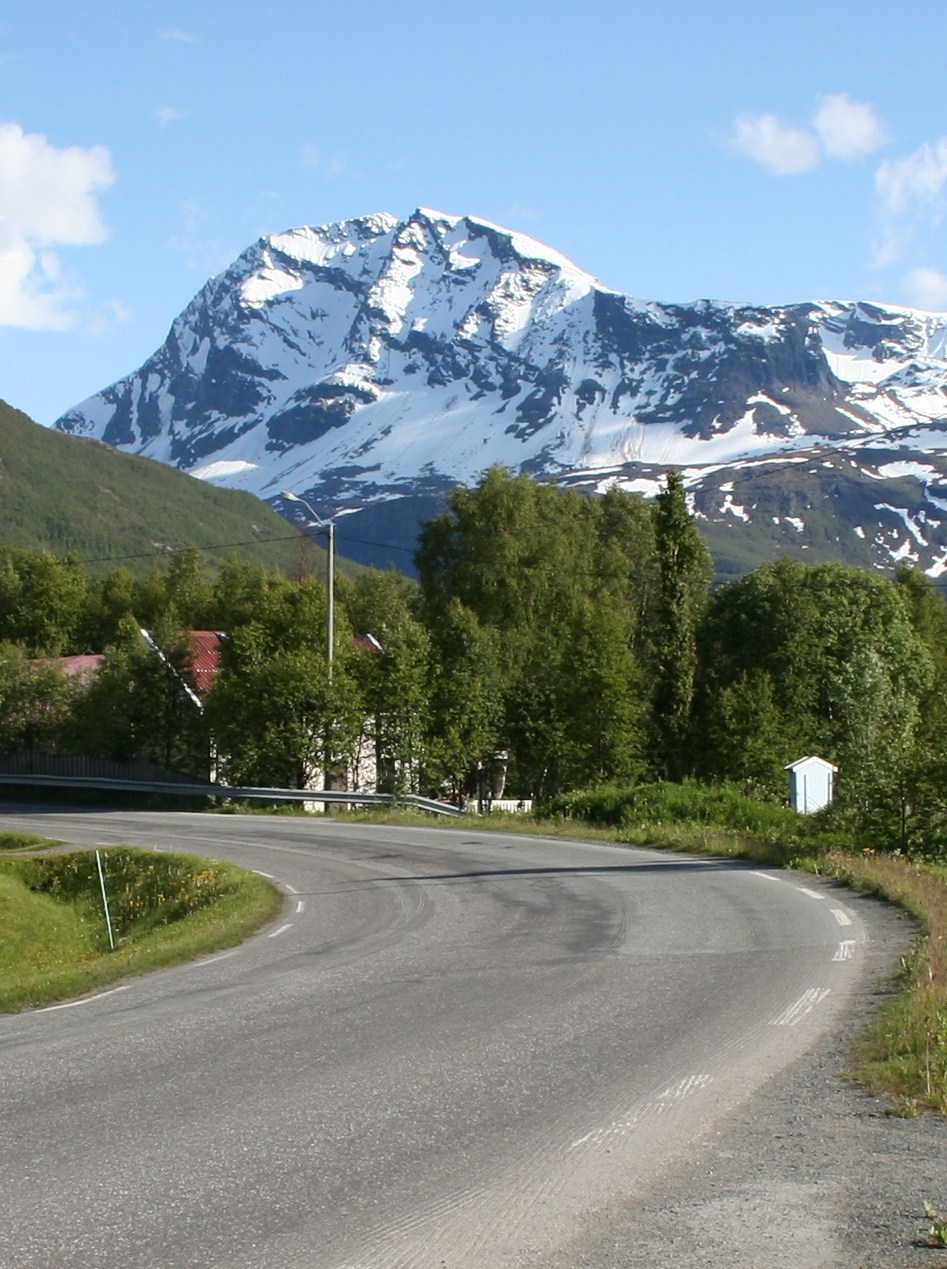
View of the mountain Spanstinden near Soløy

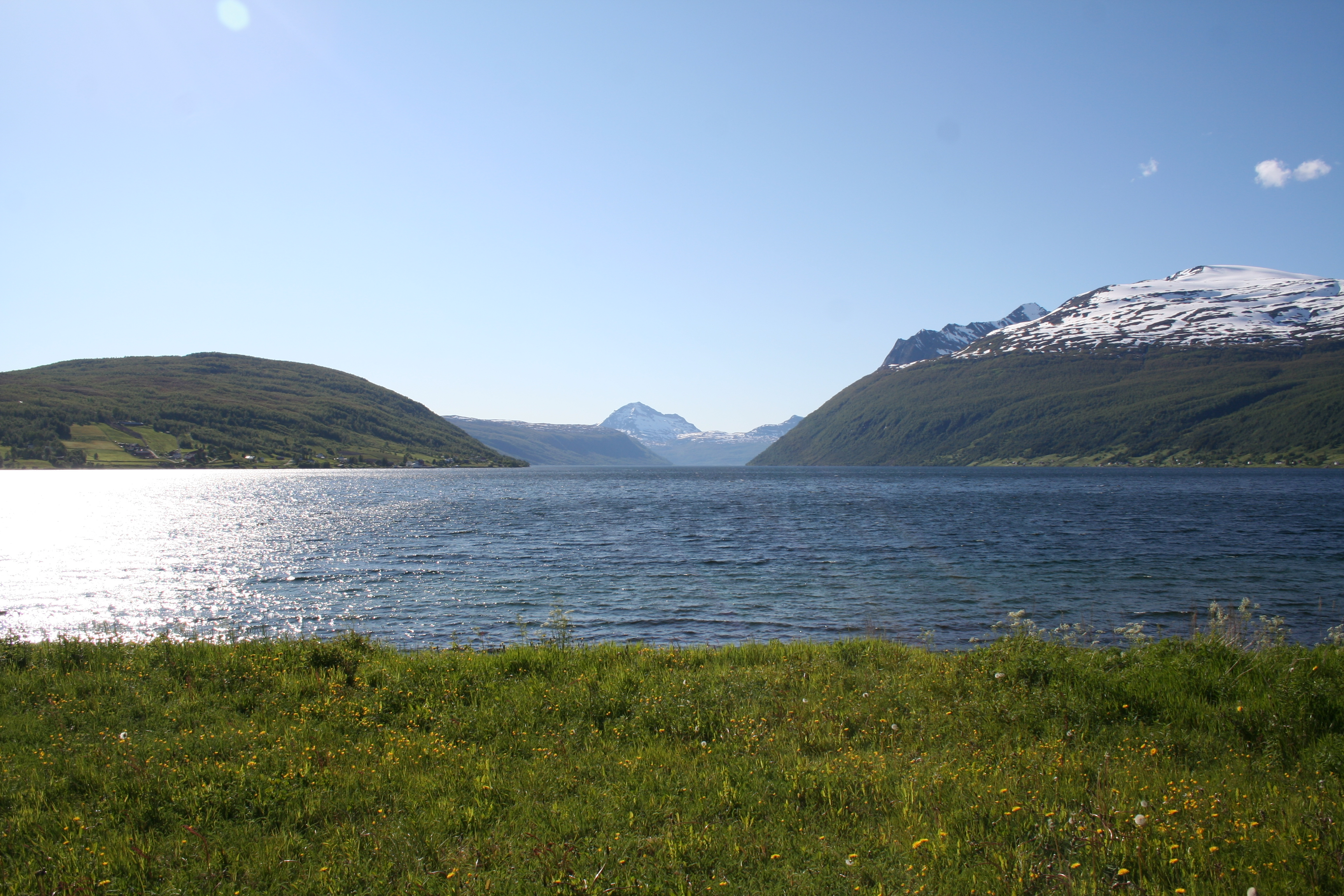
View of the Lanvangen fjord

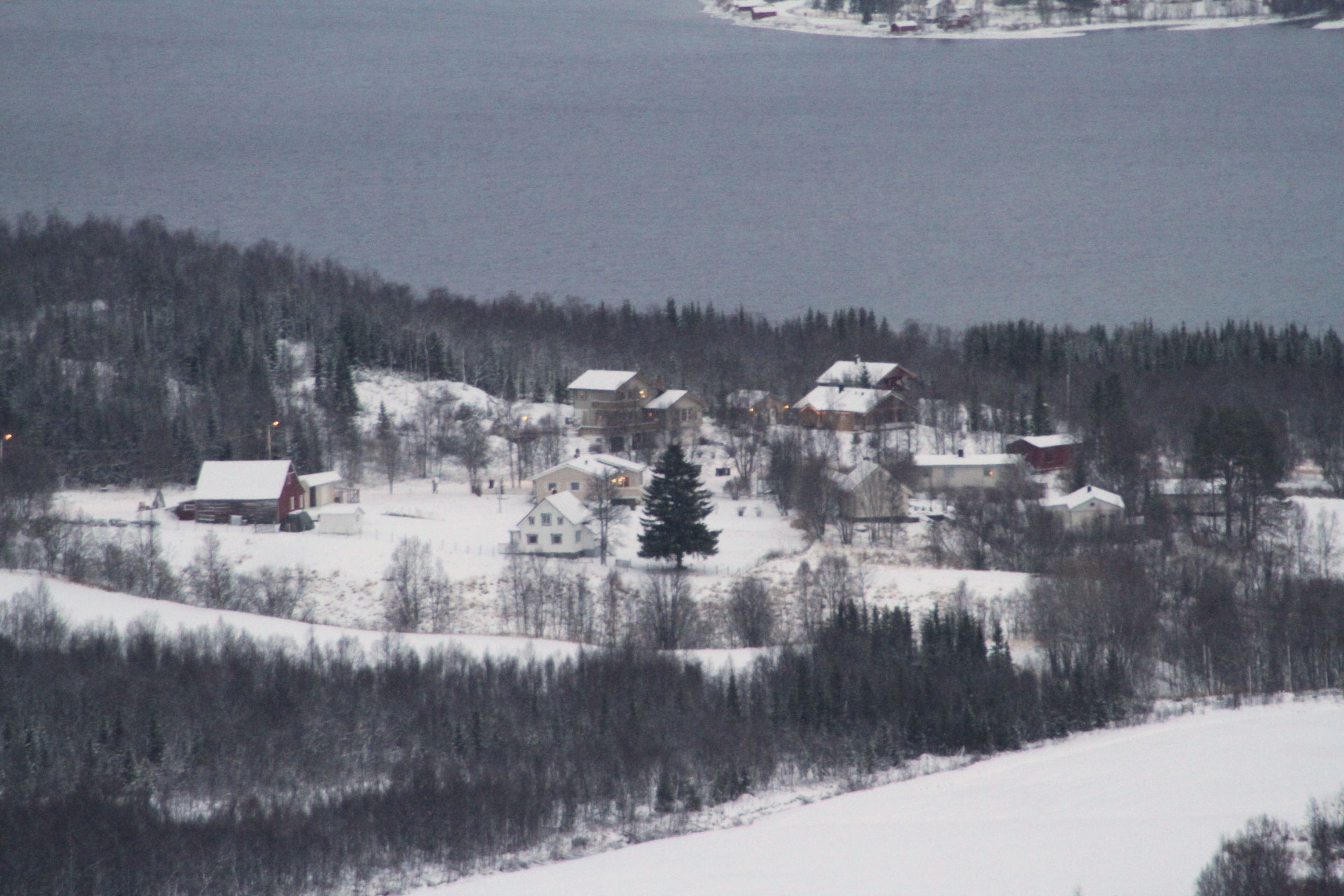
View of Skavmodalen

=== Climate ===
Climate data for Tennevoll
Month	Jan	Feb	Mar	Apr	May	Jun	Jul	Aug	Sep	Oct	Nov	Dec	Year
Mean daily maximum °C (°F)	−3.2 (26.2)	−2.2 (28.0)	1.1 (34.0)	4.5 (40.1)	10.1 (50.2)	15.0 (59.0)	17.2 (63.0)	15.6 (60.1)	10.6 (51.1)	4.8 (40.6)	0.6 (33.1)	−1.2 (29.8)	6.1 (43.0)
Daily mean °C (°F)	−6.7 (19.9)	−5.8 (21.6)	−2.9 (26.8)	1.2 (34.2)	6.6 (43.9)	10.9 (51.6)	13.3 (55.9)	12.0 (53.6)	7.1 (44.8)	2.4 (36.3)	−2.4 (27.7)	−5.0 (23.0)	2.6 (36.7)
Mean daily minimum °C (°F)	−11.5 (11.3)	−10.2 (13.6)	−7.4 (18.7)	−3.4 (25.9)	1.4 (34.5)	6.4 (43.5)	8.9 (48.0)	7.5 (45.5)	3.0 (37.4)	−1.7 (28.9)	−6.4 (20.5)	−8.9 (16.0)	−1.9 (28.6)
Average precipitation mm (inches)	80 (3.1)	81 (3.2)	60 (2.4)	53 (2.1)	38 (1.5)	59 (2.3)	69 (2.7)	76 (3.0)	92 (3.6)	113 (4.4)	88 (3.5)	91 (3.6)	910 (35.8)
Average precipitation days (≥ 1 mm)	11.2	11.8	10.1	9.3	8.5	10.9	12.8	14.8	14.6	14.7	12.0	12.0	142.7
Source: Norwegian Meteorological Institute

== Government ==
Lavangen Municipality is responsible for primary education (through 10th grade), outpatient health services, senior citizen services, welfare and other social services, zoning, economic development, and municipal roads and utilities. The municipality is governed by a municipal council of directly elected representatives. The mayor is indirectly elected by a vote of the municipal council. The municipality is under the jurisdiction of the Midtre Hålogaland District Court and the Hålogaland Court of Appeal.

=== Municipal council ===
The municipal council (Kommunestyre) of Lavangen Municipality is made up of 15 representatives that are elected to four year terms. The tables below show the current and historical composition of the council by political party.

Lavangen kommunestyre 2023–2027
Party name (in Norwegian)	Number of representatives
Labour Party (Arbeiderpartiet)	9
Conservative Party (Høyre)	4
Centre Party (Senterpartiet)	2
Total number of members:	15

Lavangen kommunestyre 2019–2023
Party name (in Norwegian)	Number of representatives
Labour Party (Arbeiderpartiet)	7
Conservative Party (Høyre)	3
Centre Party (Senterpartiet)	5
Total number of members:	15

Lavangen kommunestyre 2015–2019
Party name (in Norwegian)	Number of representatives
Labour Party (Arbeiderpartiet)	5
Progress Party (Fremskrittspartiet)	1
Conservative Party (Høyre)	3
Centre Party (Senterpartiet)	6
Total number of members:	15

Lavangen kommunestyre 2011–2015
Party name (in Norwegian)	Number of representatives
Labour Party (Arbeiderpartiet)	6
Progress Party (Fremskrittspartiet)	2
Conservative Party (Høyre)	3
Centre Party (Senterpartiet)	4
Total number of members:	15

Lavangen kommunestyre 2007–2011
Party name (in Norwegian)	Number of representatives
Labour Party (Arbeiderpartiet)	8
Conservative Party (Høyre)	2
Christian Democratic Party (Kristelig Folkeparti)	2
Centre Party (Senterpartiet)	3
Total number of members:	15

Lavangen kommunestyre 2003–2007
Party name (in Norwegian)	Number of representatives
Labour Party (Arbeiderpartiet)	5
Centre Party (Senterpartiet)	6
Joint list of the Conservative Party (Høyre) and Christian Democratic Party (Kristelig Folkeparti)	4
Total number of members:	15

Lavangen kommunestyre 1999–2003
Party name (in Norwegian)	Number of representatives
Labour Party (Arbeiderpartiet)	7
Conservative Party (Høyre)	4
Christian Democratic Party (Kristelig Folkeparti)	3
Centre Party (Senterpartiet)	1
Total number of members:	15

Lavangen kommunestyre 1995–1999
Party name (in Norwegian)	Number of representatives
Labour Party (Arbeiderpartiet)	7
Conservative Party (Høyre)	3
Christian Democratic Party (Kristelig Folkeparti)	2
Centre Party (Senterpartiet)	3
Total number of members:	15

Lavangen kommunestyre 1991–1995
Party name (in Norwegian)	Number of representatives
Labour Party (Arbeiderpartiet)	8
Conservative Party (Høyre)	5
Joint list of the Centre Party (Senterpartiet), Christian Democratic Party (Kristelig Folkeparti), and Liberal Party (Venstre)	2
Total number of members:	15

Lavangen kommunestyre 1987–1991
Party name (in Norwegian)	Number of representatives
Labour Party (Arbeiderpartiet)	8
Conservative Party (Høyre)	6
Joint list of the Centre Party (Senterpartiet), Christian Democratic Party (Kristelig Folkeparti), and Liberal Party (Venstre)	2
Spansdalen local list (Spansdalen Bygdeliste)	1
Total number of members:	17

Lavangen kommunestyre 1983–1987
Party name (in Norwegian)	Number of representatives
Labour Party (Arbeiderpartiet)	9
Conservative Party (Høyre)	5
Christian Democratic Party (Kristelig Folkeparti)	1
Joint list of the Centre Party (Senterpartiet) and the Liberal Party (Venstre)	1
Spansdalen local list (Spansdalen bygdeliste)	1
Total number of members:	17

Lavangen kommunestyre 1979–1983
Party name (in Norwegian)	Number of representatives
Labour Party (Arbeiderpartiet)	8
Christian Democratic Party (Kristelig Folkeparti)	1
Joint list of the Centre Party (Senterpartiet) and the Liberal Party (Venstre)	1
Lavangen common list (Lavangen bygdeliste)	6
Spansdalen common list (Spansdalen bygdeliste)	1
Total number of members:	17
Note: From 1 January 1964 until 31 December 1976, Lavangen Municipality was part of Salangen Municipality.

Lavangen herredsstyre 1959–1963
Party name (in Norwegian)	Number of representatives
Labour Party (Arbeiderpartiet)	7
Local List(s) (Lokale lister)	10
Total number of members:	17
Note: From 1 January 1964 until 31 December 1976, Lavangen Municipality was part of Salangen Municipality.

Lavangen herredsstyre 1955–1959
Party name (in Norwegian)	Number of representatives
Labour Party (Arbeiderpartiet)	7
Local List(s) (Lokale lister)	10
Total number of members:	17

Lavangen herredsstyre 1951–1955
Party name (in Norwegian)	Number of representatives
Labour Party (Arbeiderpartiet)	6
Local List(s) (Lokale lister)	10
Total number of members:	16

Lavangen herredsstyre 1947–1951
Party name (in Norwegian)	Number of representatives
Labour Party (Arbeiderpartiet)	8
Local List(s) (Lokale lister)	8
Total number of members:	16

Lavangen herredsstyre 1945–1947
Party name (in Norwegian)	Number of representatives
Labour Party (Arbeiderpartiet)	6
Local List(s) (Lokale lister)	10
Total number of members:	16

Lavangen herredsstyre 1937–1941*
Party name (in Norwegian)	Number of representatives
Labour Party (Arbeiderpartiet)	8
Local List(s) (Lokale lister)	8
Total number of members:	16
Note: Due to the German occupation of Norway during World War II, no elections were held for new municipal councils until after the war ended in 1945.

=== Mayors ===
The mayor (Norwegian: ordfører) of Lavangen Municipality is the political leader of the municipality and the chairperson of the municipal council. Here is a list of people who have held this position:

- 1907–1913: Bernhard Dahl Karlsen
- 1914–1922: Fredrik B. Hansen (Ap)
- 1923–1937: Lorentz K. Brattberg Aa (Ap)
- 1938–1941: Johan Sandmel (H)
- 1941–1941: Hjalmar Jørgensen
- 1942–1945: Albert Olaus Dahl
- 1945–1945: Johan Sandmel (H)
- 1948–1963: Alfred Ottesen (Ap)
- (1964–1977: Part of Salangen Municipality)
- 1979–1983: Arne Andberg (H)
- 1983–1995: Torleif Myrseth (Ap)
- 1995–1999: Alex Herry Norbakken (KrF)
- 1999–2003: Torleif Myrseth (Ap)
- 2003–2007: Bernhardt Halvorsen (Sp)
- 2007–2011: Viktor Andberg (Ap)
- 2011–2015: Erling Bratsberg (Sp)
- 2015–2019: Bernhardt Halvorsen (Sp)
- 2019–present: Hege Beathe Myrseth Rollmoen (Ap)

== Attractions ==
Spanstind rundt is a famous cross-country skiing race in Lavangen that is held on Maundy Thursdays each year.

== Notable people ==
- Cecilie Myrseth (born 1984), a psychologist and politician who grew up in Lavangen
- Sandra Borch (born 1988 in Lavangen), a Norwegian politician
