= Tennevoll =

Village in Lavangen Municipality, Norway

Tennevoll (Norwegian); Deannja (Northern Sami)
- Village
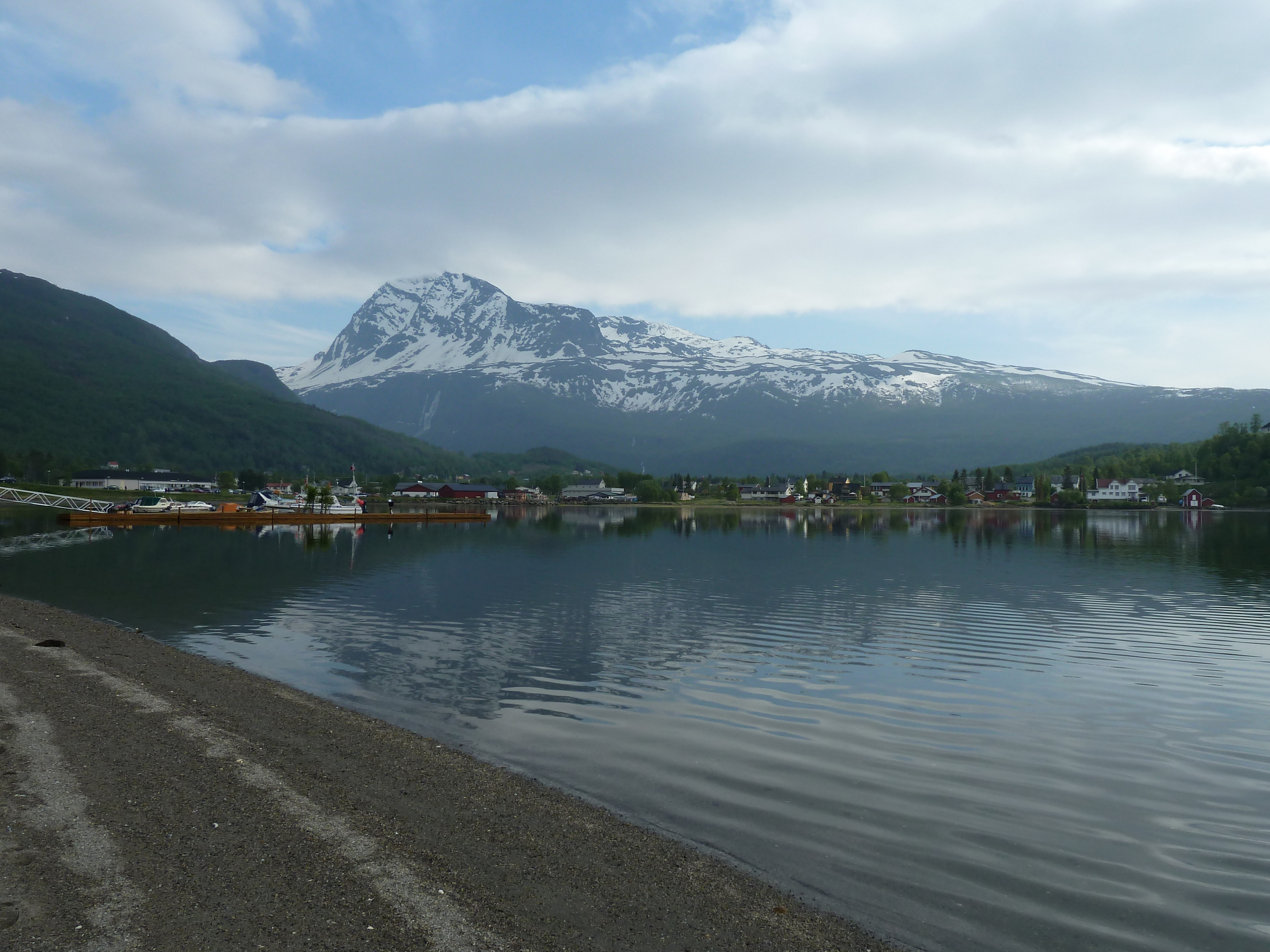
- Tennevoll
- Interactive map of: Tennevoll (Norwegian); Deannja (Northern Sami)
- Location within Troms Location within Norway
- Coordinates: 68.7471°N 17.8062°E
- Country: Norway
- Region: Northern Norway
- County: Troms
- District: Hålogaland
- Municipality: Lavangen Municipality

Area
  - Total: 0.44 km^{2} (0.17 sq mi)
- Elevation: 5 m (16 ft)

Population (2023)
  - Total: 290
  - Density: 659/km^{2} (1,710/sq mi)
- Post Code: 9357 Tennevoll

Tennevoll (Norwegian) or Deannja (Northern Sami) is the administrative centre of Lavangen Municipality in Troms county, Norway. The village lies about 50 kilometres (31 mi) straight east of the town of Harstad. Tennevoll is located at the end of the Lavangen fjord, along the river Spansdalselva, which flows through the Spansdalen valley. The 632-metre (2,073 ft) tall mountain Reinbergen sits just to the east of the village.

The 0.44-square-kilometre (110-acre) village has a population (2023) of 290 and a population density of 659 inhabitants per square kilometre (1,710/sq mi). The only school for the municipality is located in Tennevoll, and Lavangen Church is 2 km (1.2 mi) to the north in the village of Soløy.

Historically, the village of Soløy was the administrative centre of Lavangen Municipality, from 1907 when the municipality was established until 1964 when it was merged into Salangen Municipality. On 1 January 1977, Lavangen Municipality was re-established and Tennevoll was chosen as the new administrative centre instead of Soløy.
