= Lavangen (fjord) =

Fjord in Troms county, Norway

Lavangen (Norwegian) Loabákvuotna (Northern Sami)
- Lavangsfjorden
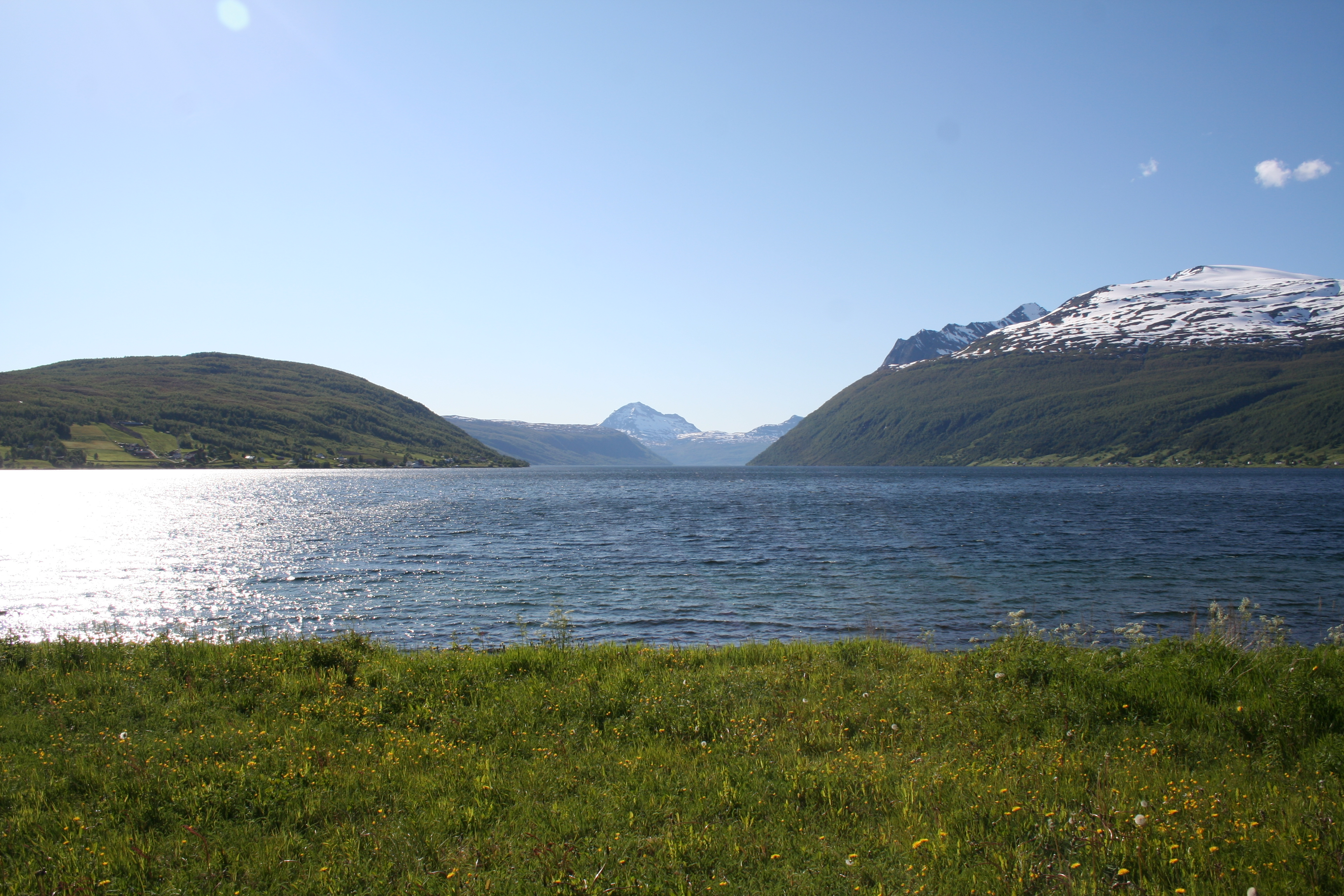
- View of the fjord
- Interactive map of the fjord
- Location: Troms county, Norway
- Coordinates: 68.7979°N 17.5905°E
- Type: Fjord
- Basin countries: Norway
- Max. length: 17 kilometres (11 mi)
- Max. depth: 202 metres (663 ft)
- Settlements: Å, Tennevoll

Lavangen (Norwegian) or Loabákvuotna (Northern Sami) is a fjord in Lavangen Municipality and Salangen Municipality in Troms county, Norway. The majority of the fjord is in Lavangen Municipality (hence the name of the municipality). The 17-kilometre (11 mi) long fjord flows to the northwest and empties into the larger Astafjorden. The deepest point in the fjord reaches about 202 metres (663 ft) below sea level. The village of Tennevoll lies at the end of the fjord and the village of Å lies on the northern shore.

== See also ==
- List of Norwegian fjords
