= Hesjevika =

Heshun 和顺县 Hoshun
- County
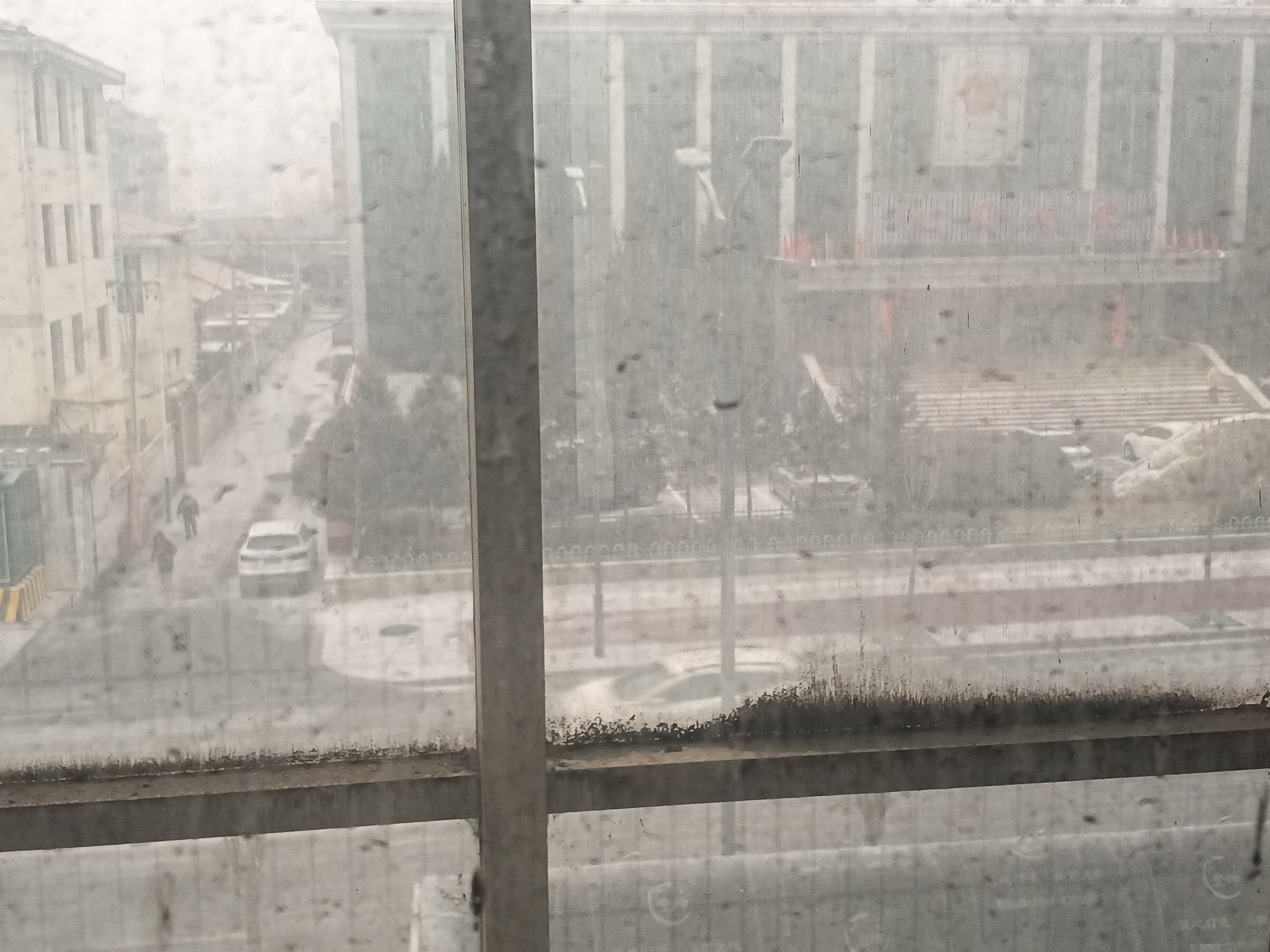

- Location of the seat in Shanxi
- Coordinates: 37.2891°N 113.305°E
- Country: People's Republic of China
- Province: Shanxi
- Prefecture-level city: Jinzhong
- Time zone: UTC+8 (China Standard)
- Website: www.heshun.gov.cn

Heshun County (simplified Chinese: 和顺县; traditional Chinese: 和順縣; pinyin: Héshùn Xiàn) is a county of east-central Shanxi province, China. It is under the administration of Jinzhong City.

== Climate ==
Climate data for Heshun, elevation 1,266 m (4,154 ft), (1991–2020 normals, extremes 1981–2010)
| Month | Jan | Feb | Mar | Apr | May | Jun | Jul | Aug | Sep | Oct | Nov | Dec | Year |
|---|---|---|---|---|---|---|---|---|---|---|---|---|---|
| Record high °C (°F) | 14.4 (57.9) | 21.0 (69.8) | 25.7 (78.3) | 32.8 (91.0) | 35.0 (95.0) | 37.3 (99.1) | 36.4 (97.5) | 32.6 (90.7) | 32.4 (90.3) | 26.2 (79.2) | 23.4 (74.1) | 15.7 (60.3) | 37.3 (99.1) |
| Mean daily maximum °C (°F) | 1.5 (34.7) | 4.4 (39.9) | 10.2 (50.4) | 17.1 (62.8) | 22.3 (72.1) | 25.8 (78.4) | 26.8 (80.2) | 25.2 (77.4) | 21.2 (70.2) | 15.8 (60.4) | 8.8 (47.8) | 2.7 (36.9) | 15.2 (59.3) |
| Daily mean °C (°F) | −7.1 (19.2) | −3.9 (25.0) | 2.1 (35.8) | 9.1 (48.4) | 14.8 (58.6) | 18.6 (65.5) | 20.4 (68.7) | 18.8 (65.8) | 13.9 (57.0) | 7.8 (46.0) | 0.8 (33.4) | −5.2 (22.6) | 7.5 (45.5) |
| Mean daily minimum °C (°F) | −13.7 (7.3) | −10.4 (13.3) | −4.6 (23.7) | 1.7 (35.1) | 7.1 (44.8) | 11.8 (53.2) | 15.2 (59.4) | 13.9 (57.0) | 8.2 (46.8) | 1.7 (35.1) | −5.1 (22.8) | −11.3 (11.7) | 1.2 (34.2) |
| Record low °C (°F) | −26.1 (−15.0) | −25.0 (−13.0) | −25.0 (−13.0) | −12.1 (10.2) | −4.2 (24.4) | 2.3 (36.1) | 6.2 (43.2) | 4.0 (39.2) | −4.1 (24.6) | −10.0 (14.0) | −26.0 (−14.8) | −26.7 (−16.1) | −26.7 (−16.1) |
| Average precipitation mm (inches) | 3.2 (0.13) | 6.0 (0.24) | 8.9 (0.35) | 27.4 (1.08) | 42.1 (1.66) | 81.7 (3.22) | 134.6 (5.30) | 110.4 (4.35) | 62.0 (2.44) | 29.7 (1.17) | 14.0 (0.55) | 2.4 (0.09) | 522.4 (20.58) |
| Average precipitation days (≥ 0.1 mm) | 3.0 | 3.7 | 4.6 | 6.6 | 7.5 | 12.3 | 14.6 | 12.7 | 9.4 | 6.3 | 4.2 | 2.1 | 87 |
| Average snowy days | 4.1 | 5.2 | 4.8 | 1.7 | 0.1 | 0 | 0 | 0 | 0 | 0.3 | 3.0 | 3.6 | 22.8 |
| Average relative humidity (%) | 53 | 54 | 51 | 51 | 54 | 65 | 77 | 79 | 75 | 67 | 60 | 53 | 62 |
| Mean monthly sunshine hours | 191.1 | 182.2 | 213.3 | 231.3 | 251.6 | 217.6 | 203.3 | 189.3 | 180.0 | 196.0 | 190.4 | 191.1 | 2,437.2 |
| Percentage possible sunshine | 62 | 59 | 57 | 58 | 57 | 49 | 46 | 46 | 49 | 57 | 63 | 64 | 56 |
Source: China Meteorological Administration
