= Spåkenes coastal fort =

Abandoned Nazi fortress in Norway

Coordinates: 69.7584°N 20.4742°E

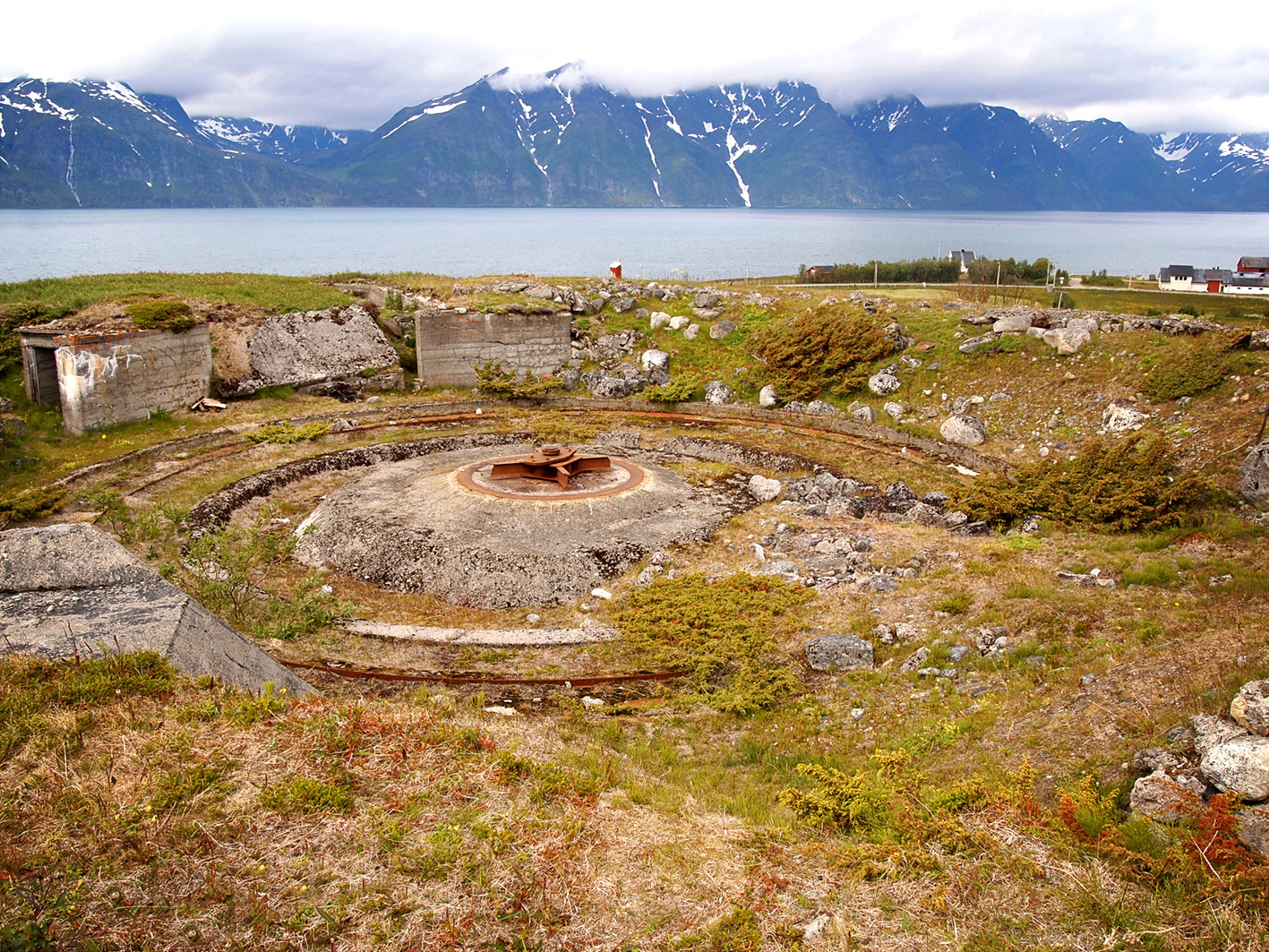
Spåkenes coastal fort, artillery bunker

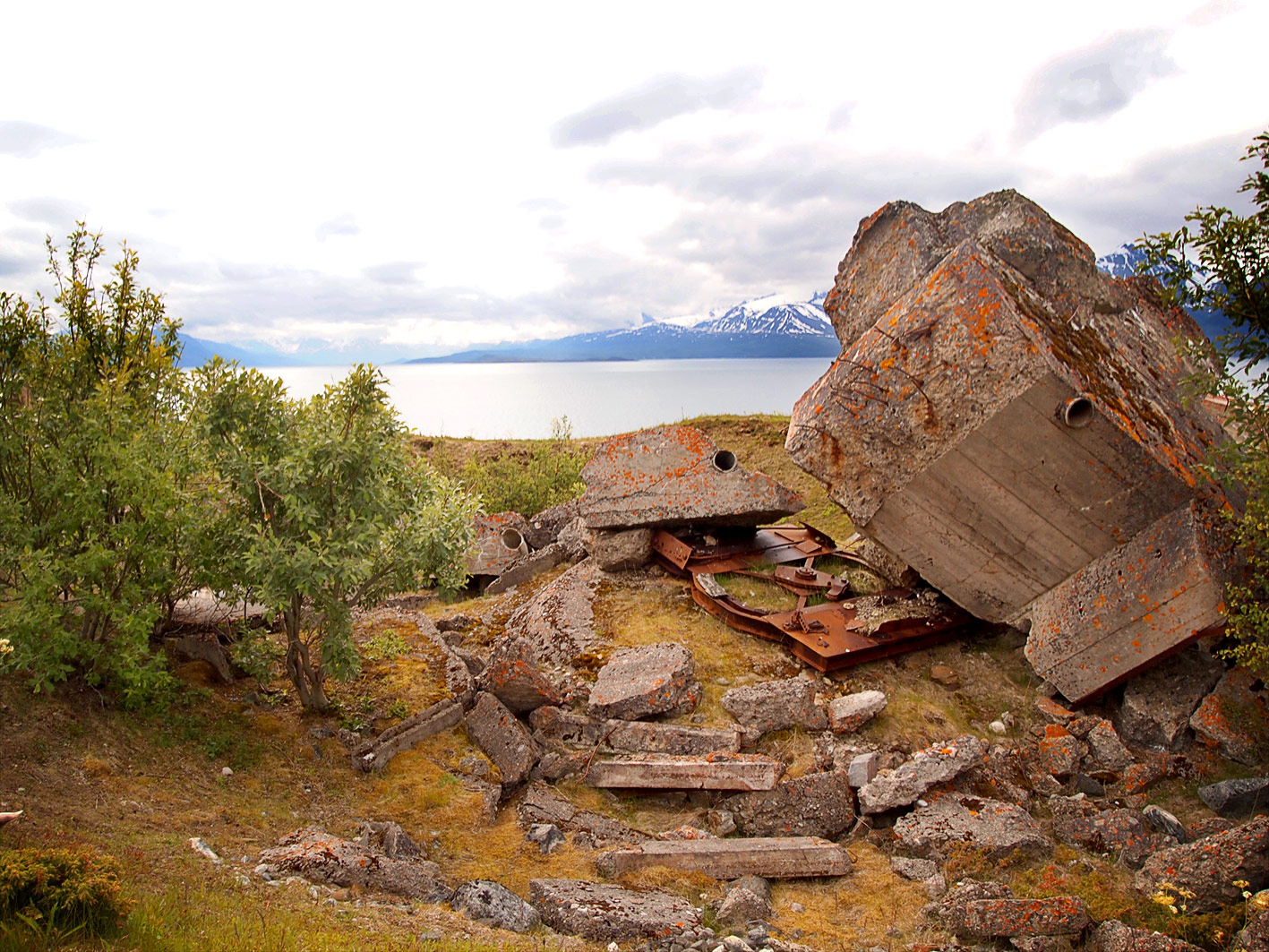
Spåkenes coastal fort, blown up bunker

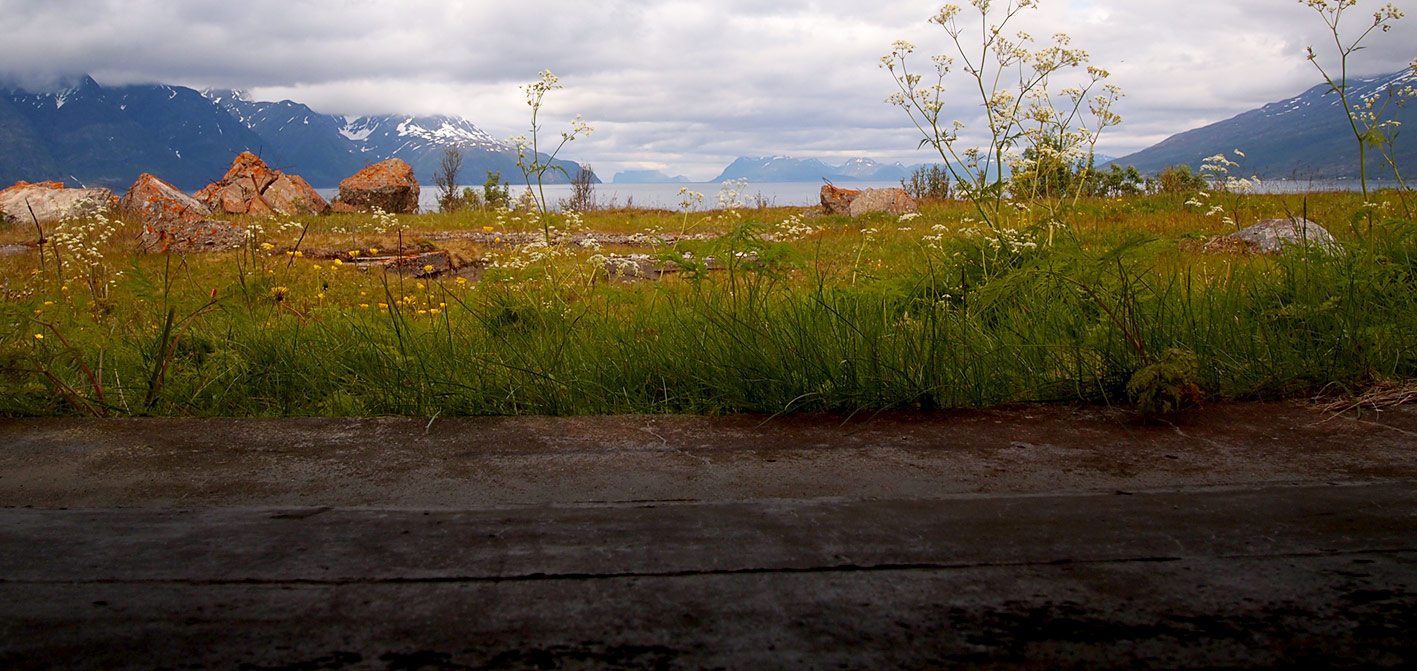
Spåkenes coastal fort, command bunker

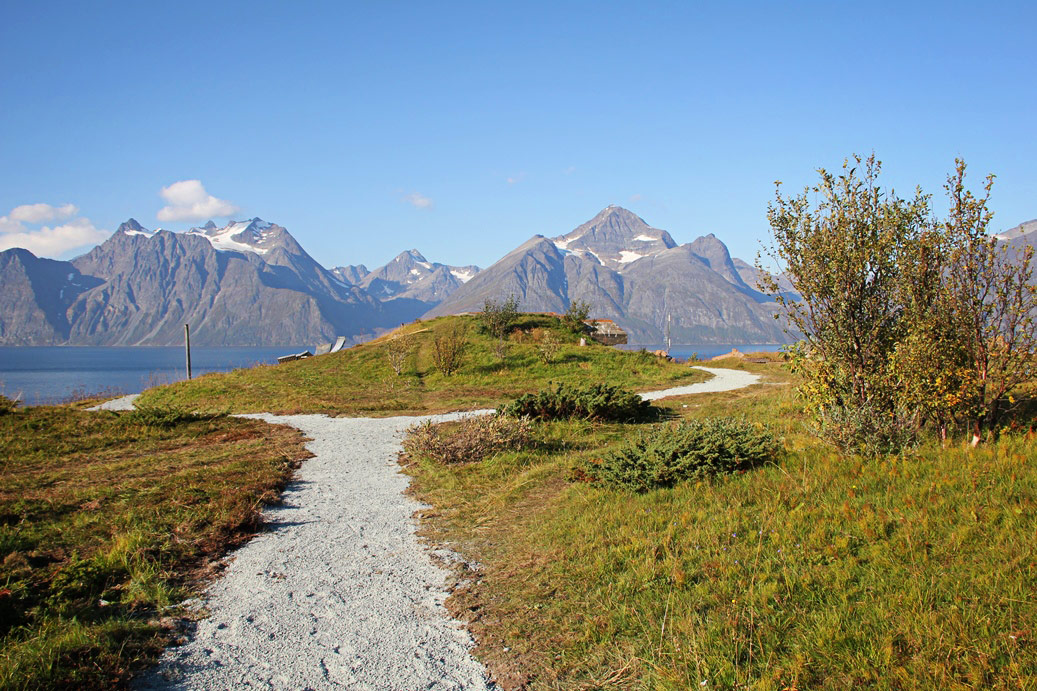
Spåkenes coastal fort, new path

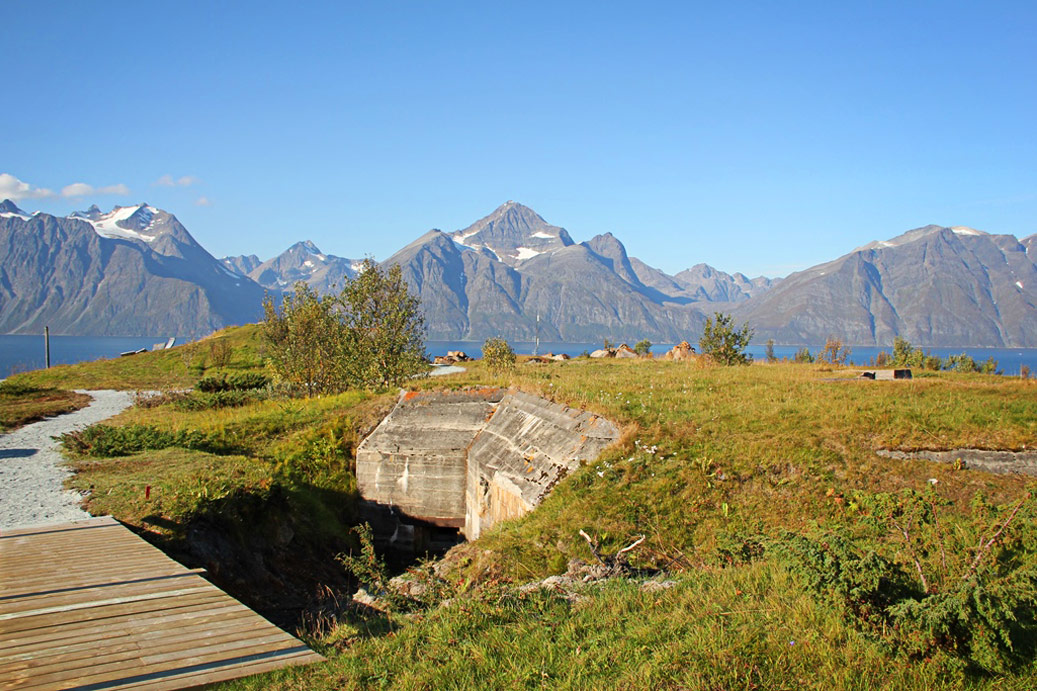
Spåkenes coastal fort, new path

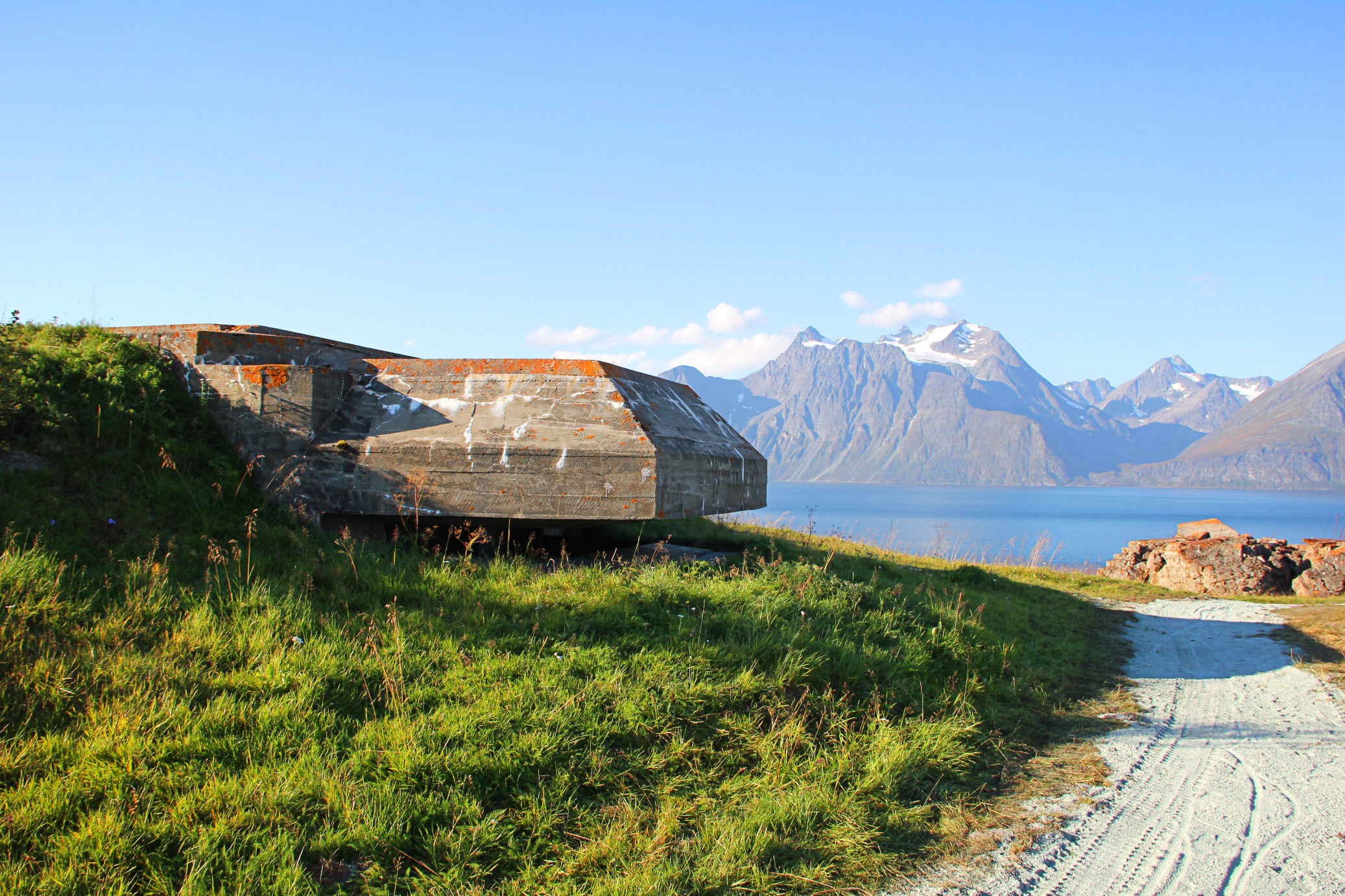
Spåkenes coastal fort, command bunker and new path

Spåkenes coastal fort is a ruined coastal fortress built by German forces during World War II in Northern Norway.

Spåkenes lies on the Spåkenes peninsula, which extends to the middle of the Lyngen fjord. It is on the hill Storbakken, the highest point of Spåkenes. Spåkenes is located on the border of Gáivuotna Municipality (Kåfjord) and Nordreisa Municipality in Troms county. The nearest village is Djupvik.

Spåkenes is open to visitors and has two marked paths that present the history of the fort via drawings and fictional accounts based on real-life situations.

== Background ==
When World War II broke out, the German navy wanted to establish naval bases in Europe to give protection to its fleet. Western Norway, with its numerous fjords and a coastline that is thousands of kilometres long, offered a strategically ideal location. By invading Norway, Germany could ensure an uninterrupted supply of iron ore from Sweden for its military industry. However, at this point, Adolf Hitler gave priority to Germany's military campaign in Western Europe.

The situation changed when the Soviet Union launched its offensive against Finland on 30 November 1939. From information contained in British navy messages that German forces decrypted, Germany became aware that Allied forces were preparing an operation in Norway under the guise of assistance to Finland. Also, the leader of the Norwegian fascist party, Vidkun Quisling, claimed that the Norwegian government was engaged in clandestine talks aimed at allowing the British forces access to army bases in Norway.

Hitler made his final decision after the Altmark Incident, in which the British Royal Navy boarded a German tanker in Norwegian waters to release Allied merchant sailors held as prisoners. The incident convinced Hitler that Norway would fail to remain neutral.

As a result, Germany launched its Operation Weserübung, which meant invasion of Norway on 9 April 1940 at 4:15am.

The occupation of Norway allowed Germany to ensure the protection of its supply of iron ore from Sweden and to gain numerous naval bases. These proved pivotal when Allied troops sought to provide transport-related military assistance for the Red Army during Operation Barbarossa, Germany's attack on the Soviet Union.

== German troops in Djupvik ==
German troops arrived in Djupvik on the night of 28 August 1940. With the arrival of 2,000–3,000 men from these forces, the population of the village of Djupvik grew many times larger. This growth had a profound effect on the entire village. Initially, the soldiers stayed in local residents' houses.

In addition to building Spåkenes, the Germans built a hospital for their soldiers and officers, where locals too were sometimes treated.

The Spåkenes garrison consisted mainly of young Germans transferred from Honningsvåg. Many of them turned 18 only during their posting. In many cases, the soldiers were stationed in Spåkenes for just six months.

== Construction and armament of the fort ==
=== Construction ===
The Germans started building the bunkers in 1941. The majority of the workers were Soviet prisoners of war, but German prisoners (deserters and others) also worked there.

Some 200 to 300 Norwegians, from Olderdalen, Rotsund, and Reisa, worked on the bunkers, carrying sandbags shipped from Skjervøy Municipality to the building site from the port.

Spåkenes consists of four bunker complexes, each of which included a gun, ammunition bunker, trench, and infantry bunker. After the Germans left, one of the bunkers suffered extensive damage in an explosion. A fire in the gunpowder stores is one possible cause.

=== Artillery ===
Spåkenes housed several guns with a range of up to 23,000 metres. With this range, they were capable of hitting any ship off Lyngstuva, the furthest tip of the Lyngen peninsula. To enable the monitoring of a large portion of the surroundings, the command bunker was equipped with powerful binoculars. The fort never saw battle.

=== Prison camp ===
Spåkenes also contained a prisoner of war camp. Most of the prisoners were Soviet, Yugoslavian, and Polish.

The road to the local cemetery ran through the prison camp, and villagers were able to witness the conditions at the camp first hand. Local residents occasionally smuggled food to the prisoners. A torture chamber and gallows were built near the camp. Fifteen prisoners were executed either by shooting or by hanging.
