= Reisadalen =

Valley in northern Norway

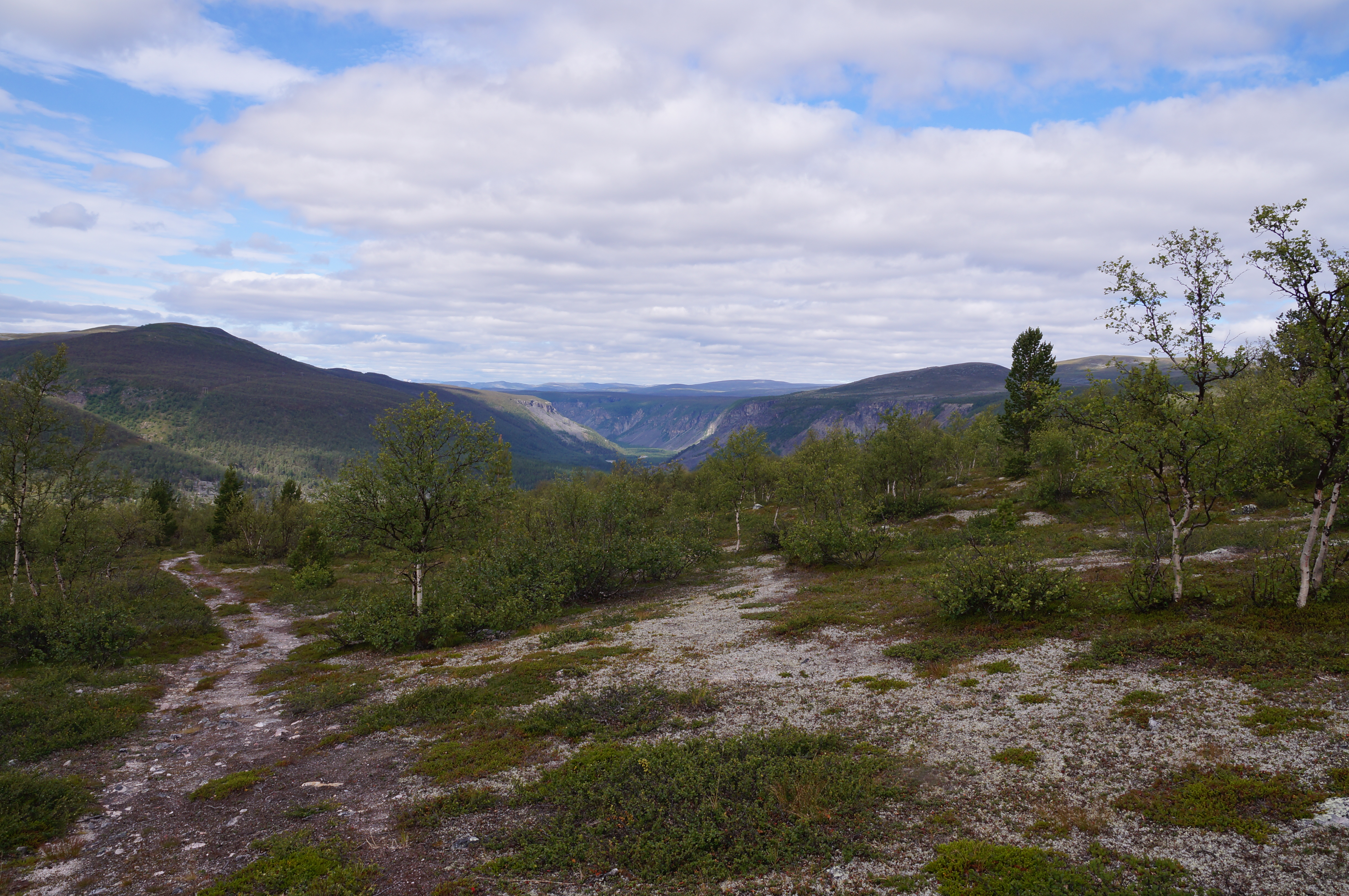
- Floor elevation: Average: 20 metres (66 ft)

Naming
- Native name: Kven: Raisinvankka
- English translation: Reisa Valley

Geography
- Country: Norway
- Population centers: Storslett, Sørkjosen
- Coordinates: 69.583333°N 21.333333°E
- River: Reisaelva
- Interactive map of Reisadalen

Reisadalen or Reisa Valley (Kven: Raisinvankka) is a valley in northern Norway stretching over 100 kilometres (62 mi) from the Finnish border to the Balsfjorden. Mountains, birch and pine forests, and rivers surround the valley. About 1700 people live in the valley.

== Geography ==
Reisadalen is in the Reisa National Park, which covers 166 square kilometres (64 sq mi) and is home to the Reisaelva River. The park also has diverse flora and fauna, including rare bird species such as the white-tailed and golden eagles. There are hiking trails in the area.

The Mollisfossen Waterfall is also in Reisadalen. The waterfall is located on the Reisaelva River and has a height of 269 metres (883 ft).

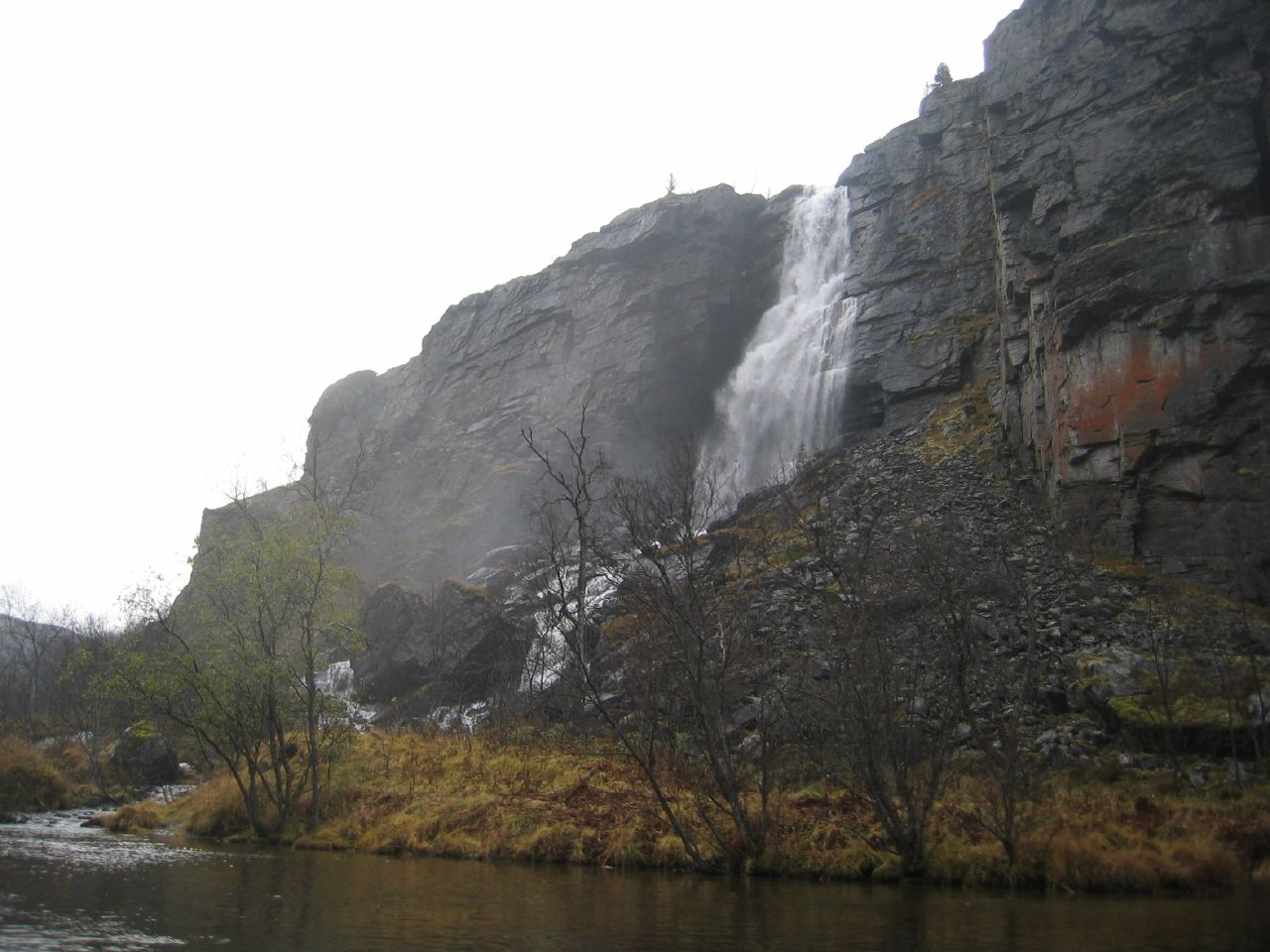
Mollisfossen in Reisa

== History ==
The remains of several tar kilns can still be found in the valley. Further up the valley, you can find remains of Sami (or Sámi) Sárran (fireplaces) and ancient pitfall trapping systems for wild reindeer.

The local area has been used by reindeer herders and the local population, which is of Norwegian, Sami and Kven (Finnish) origins. During the 18th century there was a marked increase in the migration from northern Finland and the Torne valley in northern Sweden to Reisadalen. This resulted in Reisadalen being recognized as a core area for Kven settlement.

During World War II, Reisadalen was occupied by German forces, who built a military airport in the valley. The airport transported troops and supplies to the northern front and played a significant role in the German war effort. After the war, the airport was decommissioned, and the area was returned to civilian use.

== Etymology ==
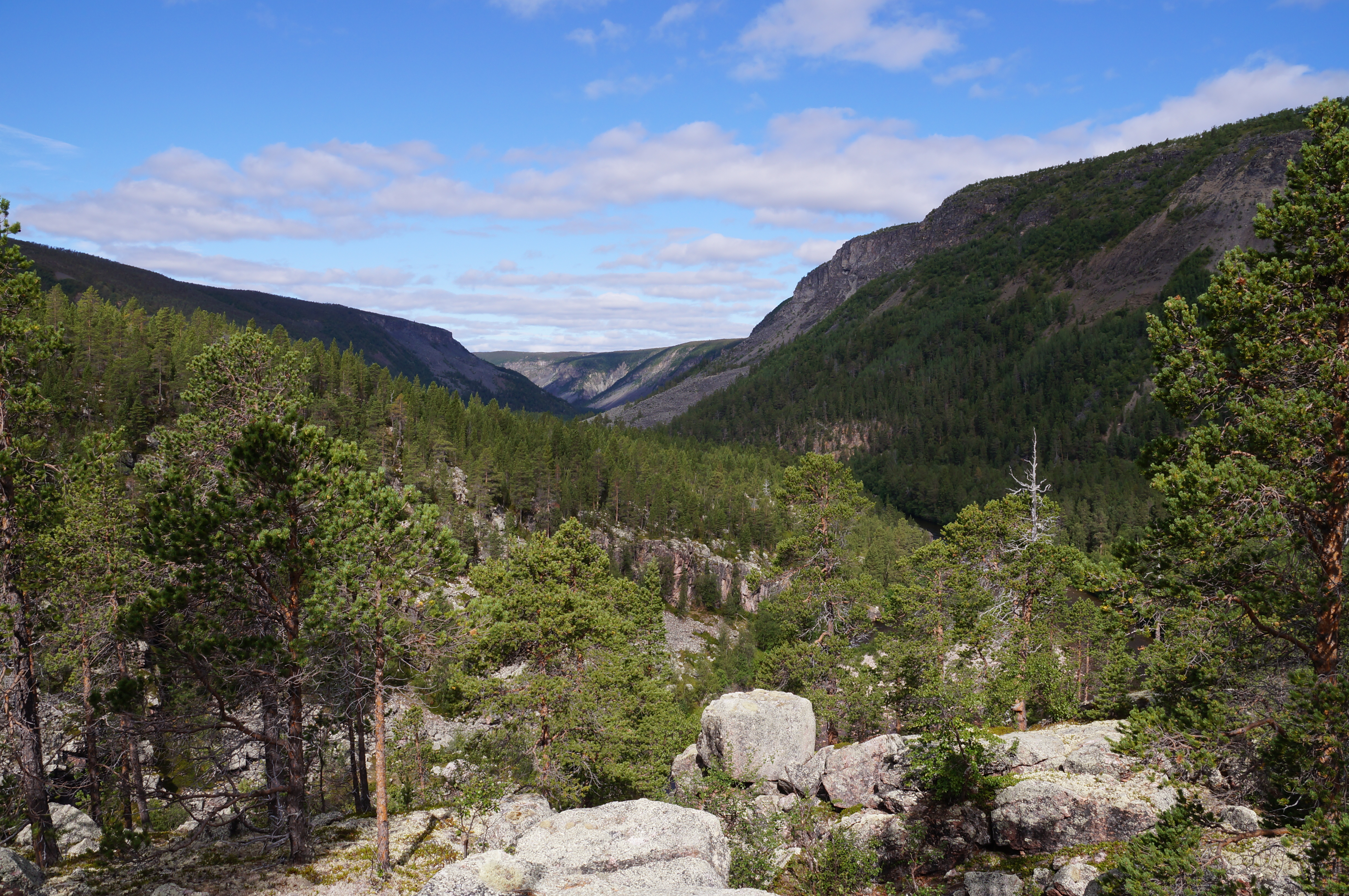
Upper part of Reisadalen

The name "Reisadalen" is Norwegian for "Reisa Valley." It is derived from the Reisaelva River, which flows through the valley.

The river comes from the Norse word "rísa," meaning "to rise." The river is known for its strong currents and rapids, which made it an essential resource for the Sami people, who used it for transportation and fishing. The valley's name, therefore, reflects the river's significance to the region's history and culture.

== Other information ==
Reisadalen hosts several festivals throughout the year that celebrate Sami culture and heritage. The most significant is the Easter Festival, which includes traditional Sami music, dance, and food.

It is also possible to view the Northern Lights, which are visible from late August to mid-April. The valley's remote location and lack of light pollution make observing this natural phenomenon possible.
