= Hamnnes =

Village in Nordreisa, Norway

Hamnnes: Hamnnes / Havnnes (Norwegian); Gárgu (Northern Sami); Karkko (Kven)
- Village
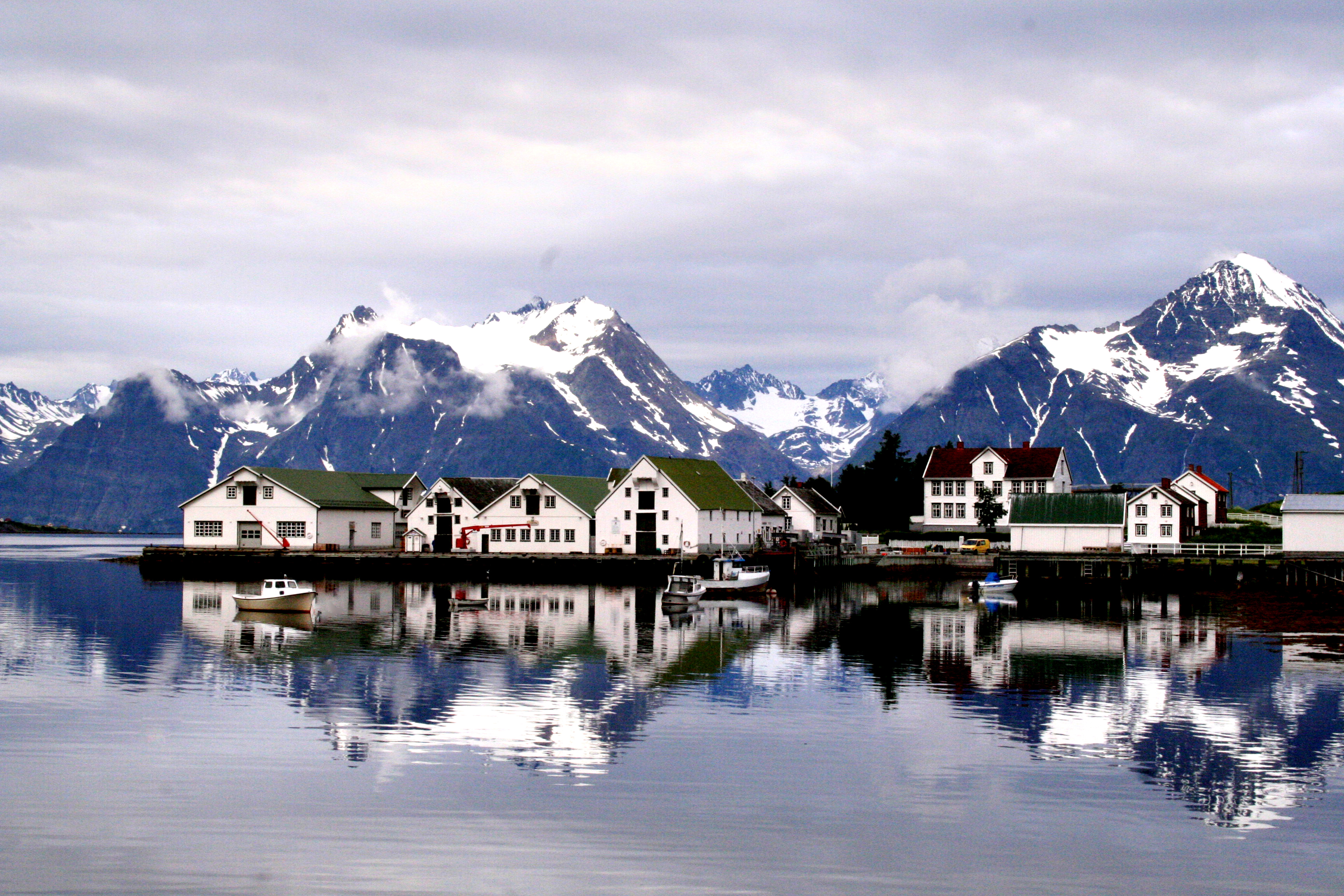
- View of the village area
- Interactive map of Hamnnes
- Location within Troms Location within Norway
- Coordinates: 69.78848°N 20.5672°E
- Country: Norway
- Region: Northern Norway
- County: Troms
- District: Nord-Troms
- Municipality: Nordreisa Municipality
- Elevation: 4 m (13 ft)
- Time zone: UTC+01:00 (CET)
  - Summer (DST): UTC+02:00 (CEST)
- Post Code: 9159 Havnnes

Hamnnes or Havnnes (Norwegian), Gárgu (Northern Sami), or Karkko (Kven) is a village in Nordreisa Municipality in Troms county, Norway. The village is located at the southern tip of the island of Uløya. The village has a very old trading post, and it is the northernmost preserved trading post in Norway that is still operational. The village has approximately fifty residents.

The village is located along the Rotsundet strait, across from the mainland village of Rotsund. The village is only accessible by boat. There is a regular ferry connection that runs between Hamnnes, Rotsund, and Uløybukta (on the north end of the island). On 1 January 1982, the Hamnnes area was transferred from Skjervøy Municipality to Nordreisa Municipality.

== History ==
Evidence of settlement in Havnnes dates back 6,000 years, as Stone Age finds have been discovered there. The Giæver family has owned the site since 1868, and remains privately owned. Most of the buildings at Havnnes are listed as historical buildings, and in 2014, the location was awarded the Olavsrosa award.

According to a copy of the royal grant, the business at Havnnes, which Johs. H. Giæver took over in 1868, was initially started by Tomas A. Lyng on August 22, 1795. Dry fish and salt fish are still produced there, and the location has a small country store where fresh newspapers and baked bread can be purchased. Houses and boats can also be rented to enjoy the Lyngen Alps.

In 2004, Havnnes was named the cultural landscape of the year in Troms. It is known for its ferry connection to Rotsund on the mainland (county road 357) and for being the home of "Mor Lyng" (Ovidia Fredrikke Lyng) in the first half of the 19th century.
