= Reisafjorden (Nordreisa) =

Fjord in Troms, Norway

Reisafjorden (Norwegian); Ráisavuotna (Northern Sami); Raisinvuono (Kven)
- Interactive map of: Reisafjorden (Norwegian); Ráisavuotna (Northern Sami); Raisinvuono (Kven)
- Location: Troms county, Norway
- Coordinates: 69.9238°N 21.1094°E
- Type: Fjord
- Primary inflows: Reisaelva river
- Primary outflows: Kvænangen
- Basin countries: Norway
- Max. length: 30 kilometres (19 mi)
- Max. width: 14 kilometres (8.7 mi)
- Settlements: Storslett, Sørkjosen

Reisafjorden (Norwegian)

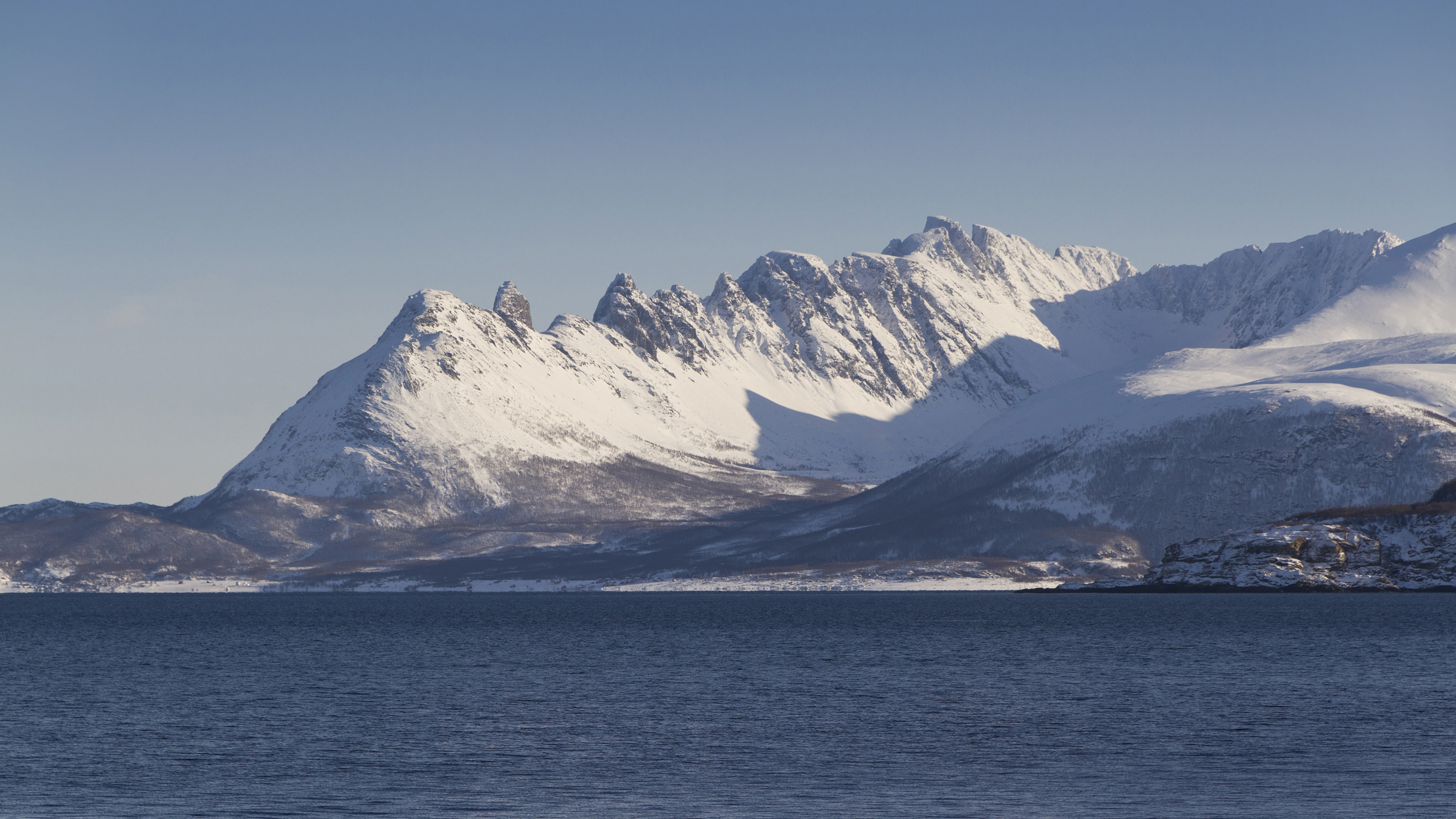
Kvænangstindan as seen from Skjervøy over Reisafjorden in 2012.

, Ráisavuotna (Northern Sami), or Raisinvuono (Kven) is a fjord in Troms county, Norway. It is located mostly in Nordreisa Municipality (with very small portions of the fjord in Kvænangen Municipality and Skjervøy Municipality). The 30-kilometre (19 mi) long fjord is an arm off the main Kvænangen fjord. The fjord is fed by the river Reisaelva which flows through the 80-kilometre (50 mi) long Reisadalen valley which starts inside Reisa National Park. The villages of Storslett and Sørkjosen are both located along the southern shore of the fjord. The European route E06 highway runs along the shore of the inner part of the fjord.

== See also ==
- List of Norwegian fjords
