= Reisaelva =

River in Norway

Reisaelva Reisa River
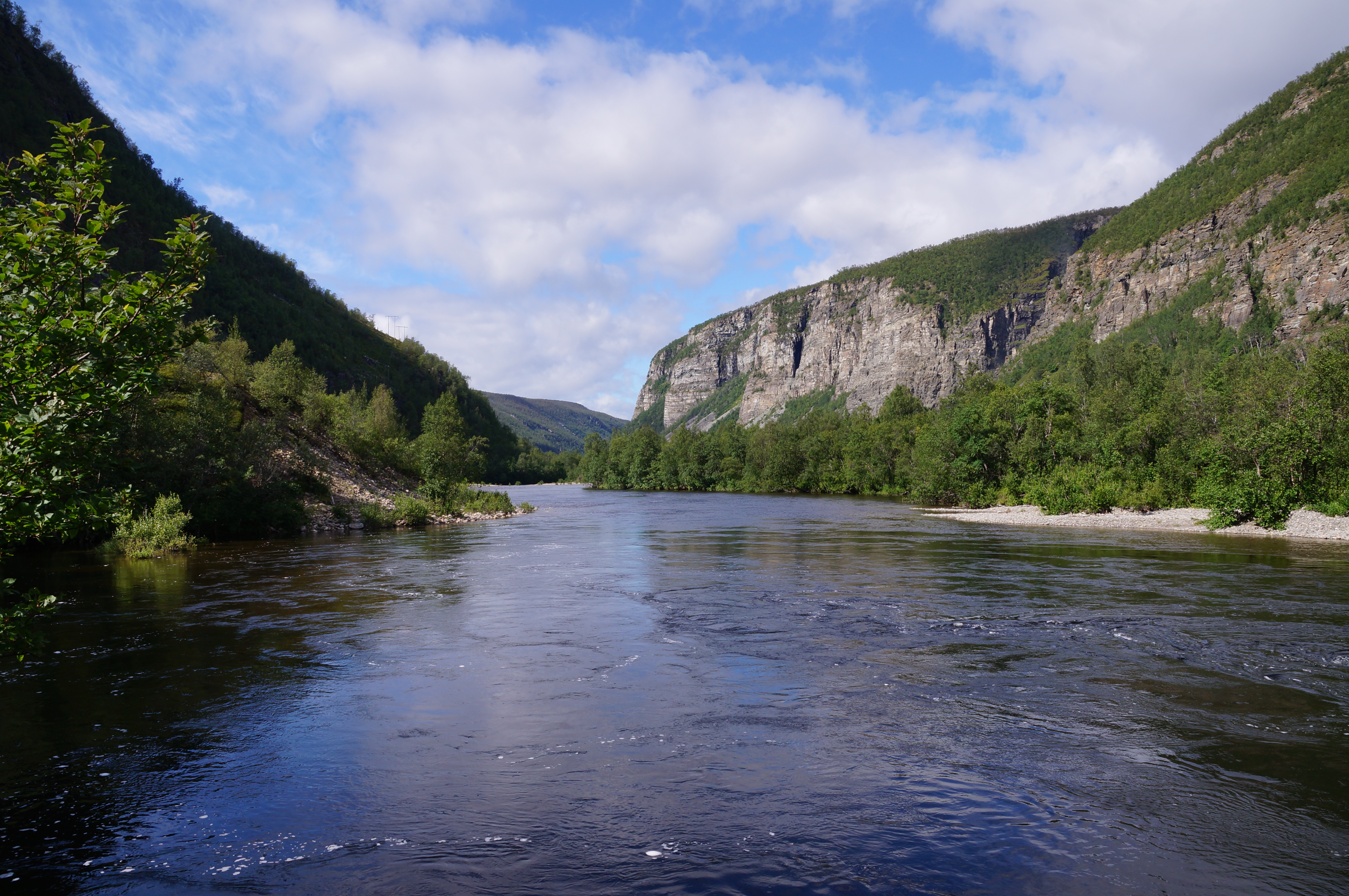
- Looking downstream of Reisaelva

Location
- Country: Norway
- County: Troms

Physical characteristics
- Source
  - location: Nordreisa
  - coordinates: 69.303763°N 21.997978°E
- Mouth
  - location: Reisafjorden
  - coordinates: 69.781972°N 21.012469°E
- Length: 90 km (56 mi)

Reisaelva or Reisa River (Northern Sami: Ráiseatnu, Kven: Raisinjoki) is a river in Northern Norway, located in the county of Troms. It runs from the lake Reisavannet in Nordreisa Municipality through the Reisa Valley and empties into the Reisafjorden in Kåfjord.

The river is approximately 90 kilometres (56 mi) long, making it one of the longest rivers in Troms.

Multiple fish in the river weighing over 20 kilograms (44 lb) have been caught. A total of 481 kilograms (1,060 lb) of salmon, sea trout, and char were caught in 2019.

== Etymology ==
The name “Reisaelva” is derived from the Northern Sámi language, one of the region's indigenous languages.

In Northern Sami, the river is called “Raisjohka,” which is a compound word made up of “rais” and “johka.” “Rais” means “flat” or “level,” while “johka” means “river.” Therefore, “Raisjohka” roughly translates to “flat river” in English.

Over time, the name has been adapted to the Norwegian language. It is now commonly referred to as "Reisaelva" in Norwegian. “Reisaelva” is from the Norwegian word meaning to rise.

== Other information ==
The Sámi people have lived in the area for thousands of years, relying on the river and its tributaries for fishing and reindeer herding. Today, the Reisaelva River and the surrounding area are protected by various conservation measures, including the Reisa National Park and the Reisaelva Salmon Management Board.
