= Sørkjosen Airport =

Airport in Nordreisa Municipality in Troms county, Norway

Sørkjosen Airport Sørkjosen lufthavn

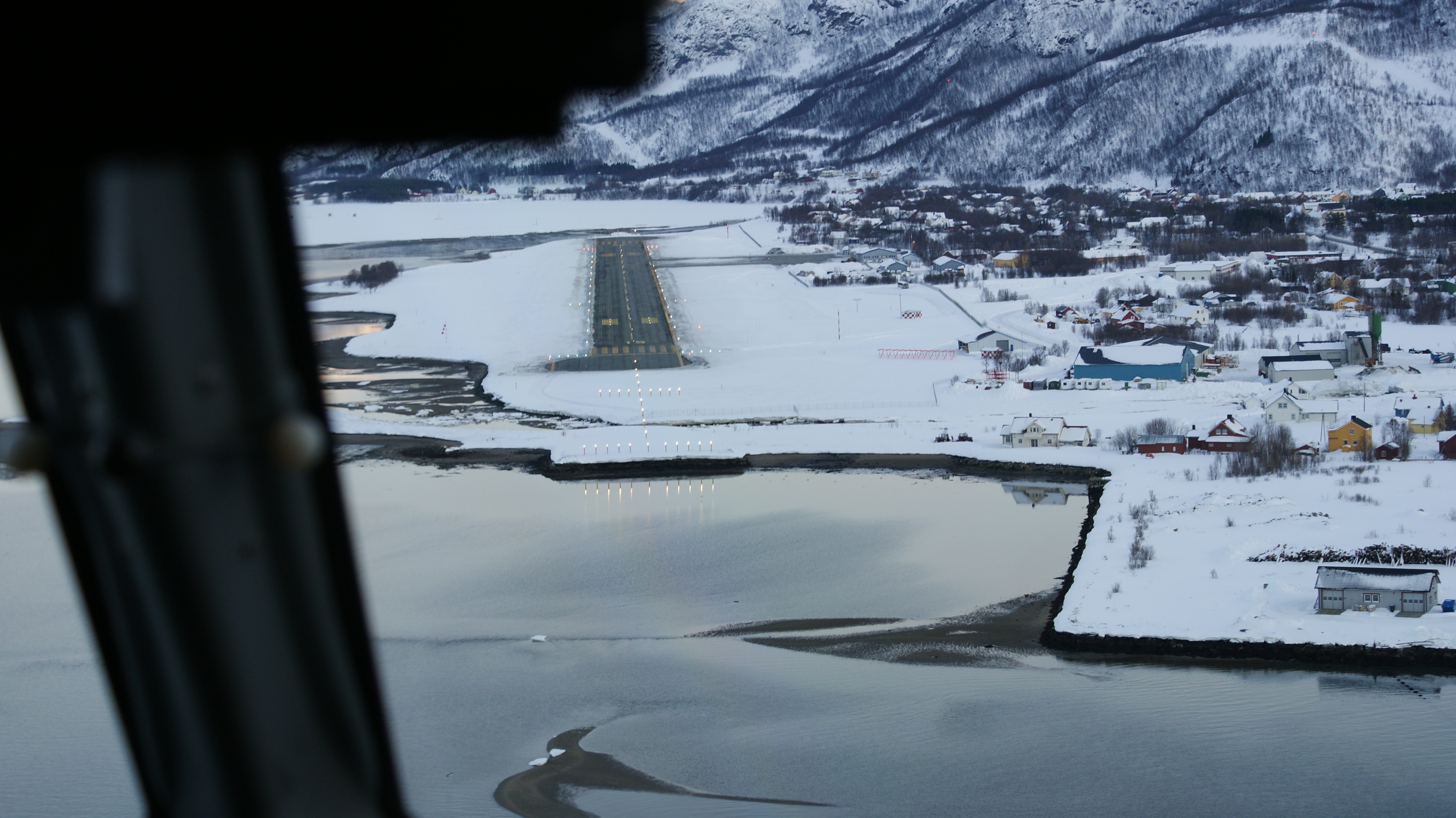
- Sørkjosen Airport seen from runway approach in a Widerøe Dash 8
- IATA: SOJ; ICAO: ENSR

Summary
- Airport type: Public
- Operator: Avinor
- Location: Sørkjosen, Nordreisa, Norway
- Elevation AMSL: 5 m / 16 ft
- Coordinates: 69°47′12″N 20°57′35″E
- Website: avinor.no

Map
- Location in Norway

Runways
Direction	Length		Surface
Direction	m	ft	Surface
15–33	880	2,890	Asphalt

Statistics (2014)
- Passengers: 15,198
- Aircraft movements: 2,343
- Cargo (tonnes): 0

Sørkjosen Airport (Norwegian: Sørkjosen lufthavn; IATA: SOJ, ICAO: ENSR) is a regional airport located at the village of Sørkjosen in Nordreisa Municipality in Troms county, Norway, about 4.5 kilometres (2.8 mi) from the municipal center of Storslett. Owned and operated by the state-owned Avinor, it handled 15,198 passengers in 2014. The airport has a 880-meter (2,890 ft) runway and is served by Widerøe, which operates regional routes using the Dash 8-100 to Tromsø, and some communities and towns in Finnmark on public service obligation contracts. The airport opened in 1974 and was originally served using de Havilland Canada Twin Otter aircraft. Dash 8s were introduced in 1995 and two years later ownership was transferred from Nordreisa Municipality to the state.

== History ==
Sørkjosen was launched as part of a national network of regional short take-off and landing airport which was proposed in the mid-1960s. The final decision to build the airport was taken by Parliament in 1972. Both Widerøe and Norving applied to operate the subsidized regional routes in Finnmark, which included the route to Sørkjosen. Widerøe was awarded the contract in 1973. Sørkjosen Airport opened on 1 August 1974, the same day as four regional airports in Finnmark.

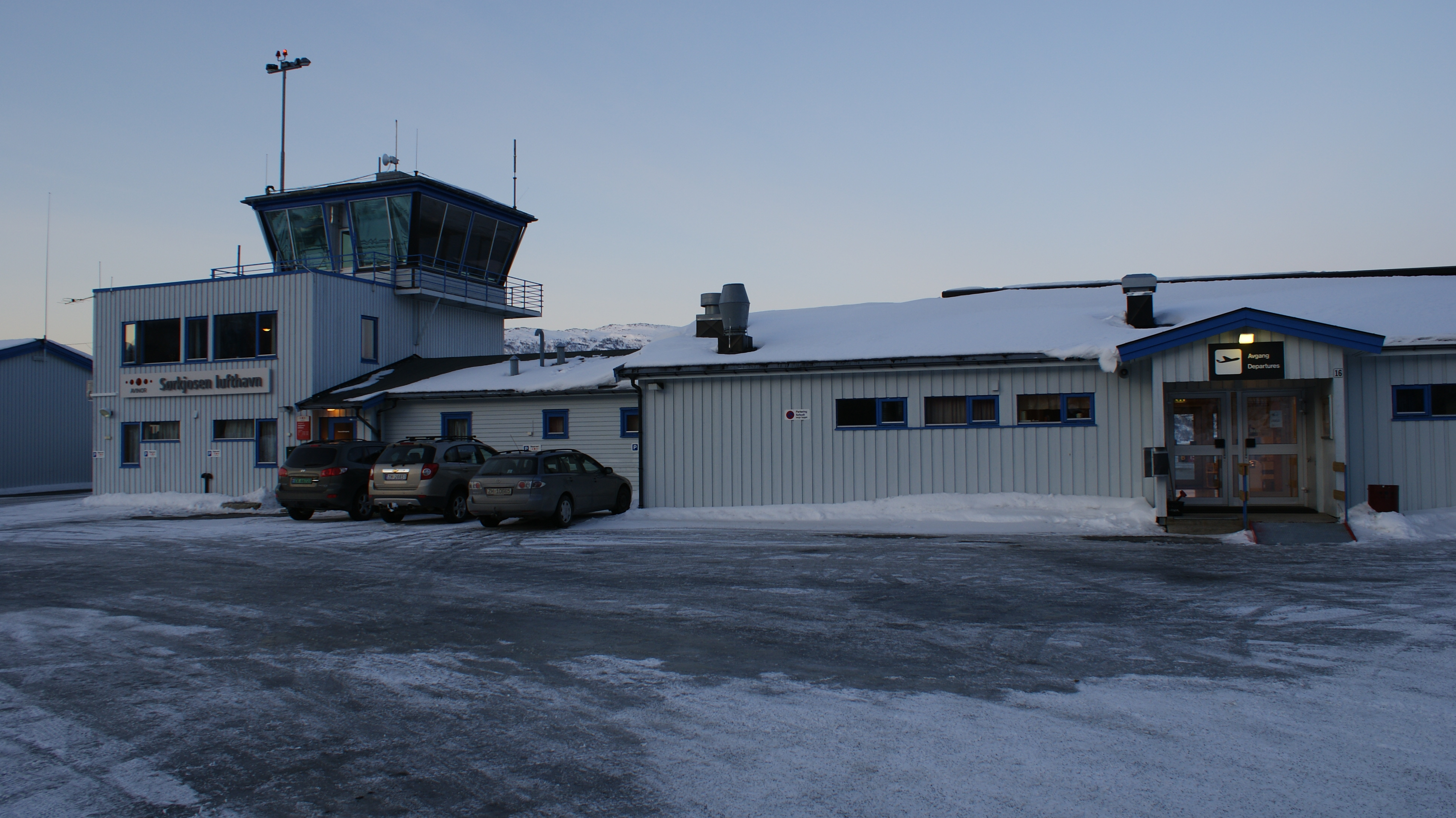
The terminal building

A new fire station, serving both the airport and the municipality, was completed in 1992, costing 3.2 million Norwegian krone. A five-week strike by three employees took place in 1992, where they demanded a collective agreement. The strike stopped all traffic at the airport, but the employees never received their demands. The Civil Aviation Administration (later renamed Avinor) recommended in 1994 that Sørkjosen and eight other airports be considered closed, as they had high costs and low patronage. Widerøe served the airport using Twin Otters until 1995, when they were replaced by the Dash 8. The airport received subsidies of 3.9 million Norwegian krone (NOK) in 1996, which allowed the airport to operate with a profit of NOK 1.4 million. The state and the Civil Aviation Administration took over ownership and operations of the airport from 1 January 1997, in exchange for NOK 3.9 million being paid to Nordreisa Municipality. Ground handling remained a municipal responsibility. Flights to Sørkjosen have been subject to public service obligations since 1 April 1997.

In the mid-1990s, Nordreisa Municipal Council attempted to change the airport's name from Sørkjosen to Nordreisa. They argued that it was necessary to use the Nordreisa name to market the region as a tourist destination. The application was rejected by the Ministry of Transport and Communications, who stated that airports were required by regulation to be named after a settlement rather than a municipality. Airport security was introduced on 1 January 2005. This required the terminal to be slightly rebuilt; while it previously had a common departure and arrivals hall, it had to be separated into two areas. The municipality therefore decided to transfer the ownership of the ground handling service to the three employees. Avinor carried out a major upgrade to the runway safety area and landing lights in 2008 and 2009. The investments cost NOK 40 million. The expansion of the safety area resulted in part of the lot of Birkelund Sawmill being expropriated.

== Facilities ==
The airport has a 880-by-30-meter (2,887 by 98 ft) asphalt runway aligned 15–33 (roughly north–south). The airport consists of a passenger terminal and an operations building. The terminal has a capacity of sixty passengers per hour and one airliner on the apron. Twenty people work at the airport, which is five minutes from Storslett. Free parking, taxis and car rental is available.

== Airlines and destinations ==
Sørkjosen Airport is served by Widerøe with Dash 8-100 aircraft connecting the community with Tromsø and airports in Finnmark. The routes are operated on public service obligation with the Ministry of Transport and Communications. The airport had 15,198 passengers, 2,343 aircraft movements and handled 0 tonnes of cargo in 2014, and 22,256 passengers in 2017. Sørkjosen airport's catchment area covers northern Troms and it is the only regional airport in the county (Tromsø and Bardufoss are primary).

Airlines	Destinations
Widerøe	Berlevåg, Hammerfest, Kirkenes, Mehamn, Tromsø, Vadsø

== Statistics ==
Annual passenger traffic
Year	Passengers	% Change
2025	12,620	▼ -5.3%
2024	13,321	▼ -29.9%
2023	19,005	▲1.4%
2022	18,745	▲4.5%
2021	17,940	▲32.0%
2020	13,590	▼ -35.8%
2019	21,176	▲7.3%
2018	19,741	▼ -11.3%
2017	22,256	▼ -14.0%
2016	25,882	▲8.7%
2015	23,804	
