= Nordreisa Church =

- Nordreisa kirke
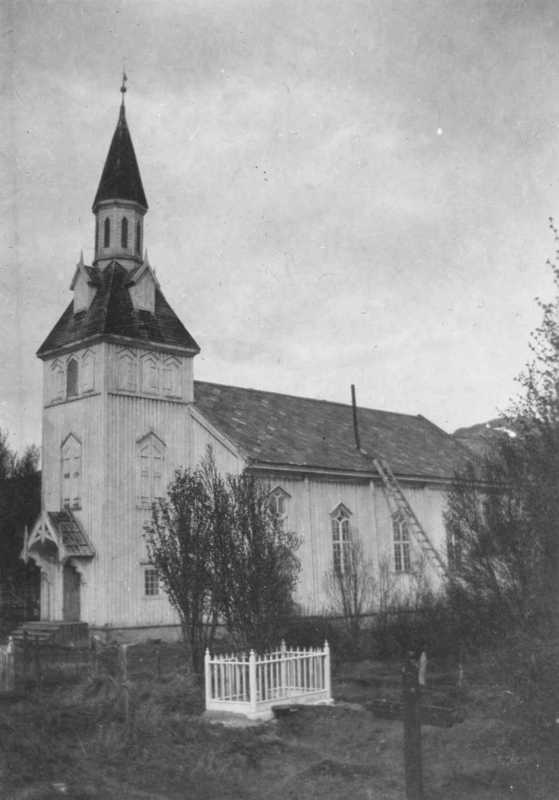
- View of the church (c. 1938)
- Nordreisa Church
- 69.769623°N 21.033357°E
- Location: Nordreisa, Troms
- Country: Norway
- Denomination: Church of Norway
- Churchmanship: Evangelical Lutheran

History
- Status: Parish church
- Founded: 1856
- Consecrated: 8 Oct 1856

Architecture
- Functional status: Active
- Architect: Christian Heinrich Grosch
- Architectural type: Long church
- Completed: 1856 (170 years ago)

Specifications
- Capacity: 350
- Materials: Wood

Administration
- Diocese: Nord-Hålogaland
- Deanery: Nord-Troms prosti
- Parish: Nordreisa
- Norwegian Cultural Heritage Site
- Type: Church
- Status: Listed
- ID: 85163

Nordreisa Church (Norwegian: Nordreisa kirke) is a parish church of the Church of Norway in Nordreisa Municipality in Troms county, Norway. It is located in the village of Storslett. It is one of the two churches for the Nordreisa parish which is part of the Nord-Troms prosti (deanery) in the Diocese of Nord-Hålogaland. The white, wooden church was built in a long church style in 1856 using plans drawn up by the architect Christian Heinrich Grosch. The church seats about 350 people.

== History ==
Construction was approved for the church around 1850 and the architect Christian Heinrich Grosch sent the architectural drawings to the parish leaders on 9 August 1852 for the new church. The building was consecrated on 8 October 1856 by the Bishop Knud Gislesen. During the last winter of World War II (1944–1945), the church was used as a residence for German soldiers, and the service building nearby was used as a horse stable. The church was spared during the burning of Finnmark and Northern Troms by the retreating German Army in 1945, but much of the church inventory disappeared during this period. A few years after the war a baptismal bowl from 1856 was found in a pile of horse manure. It was cleaned up and returned to the church.

== Media gallery ==
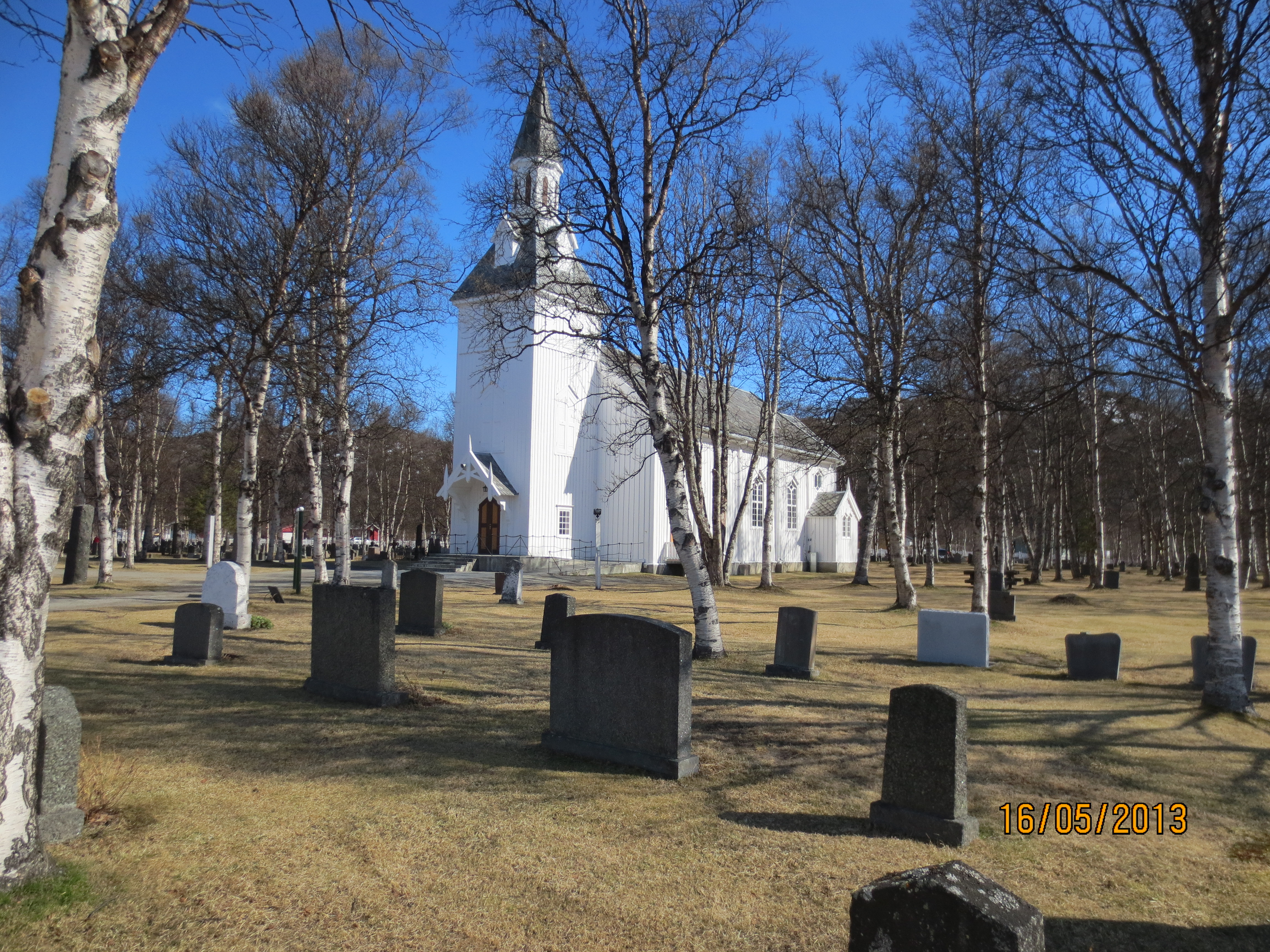

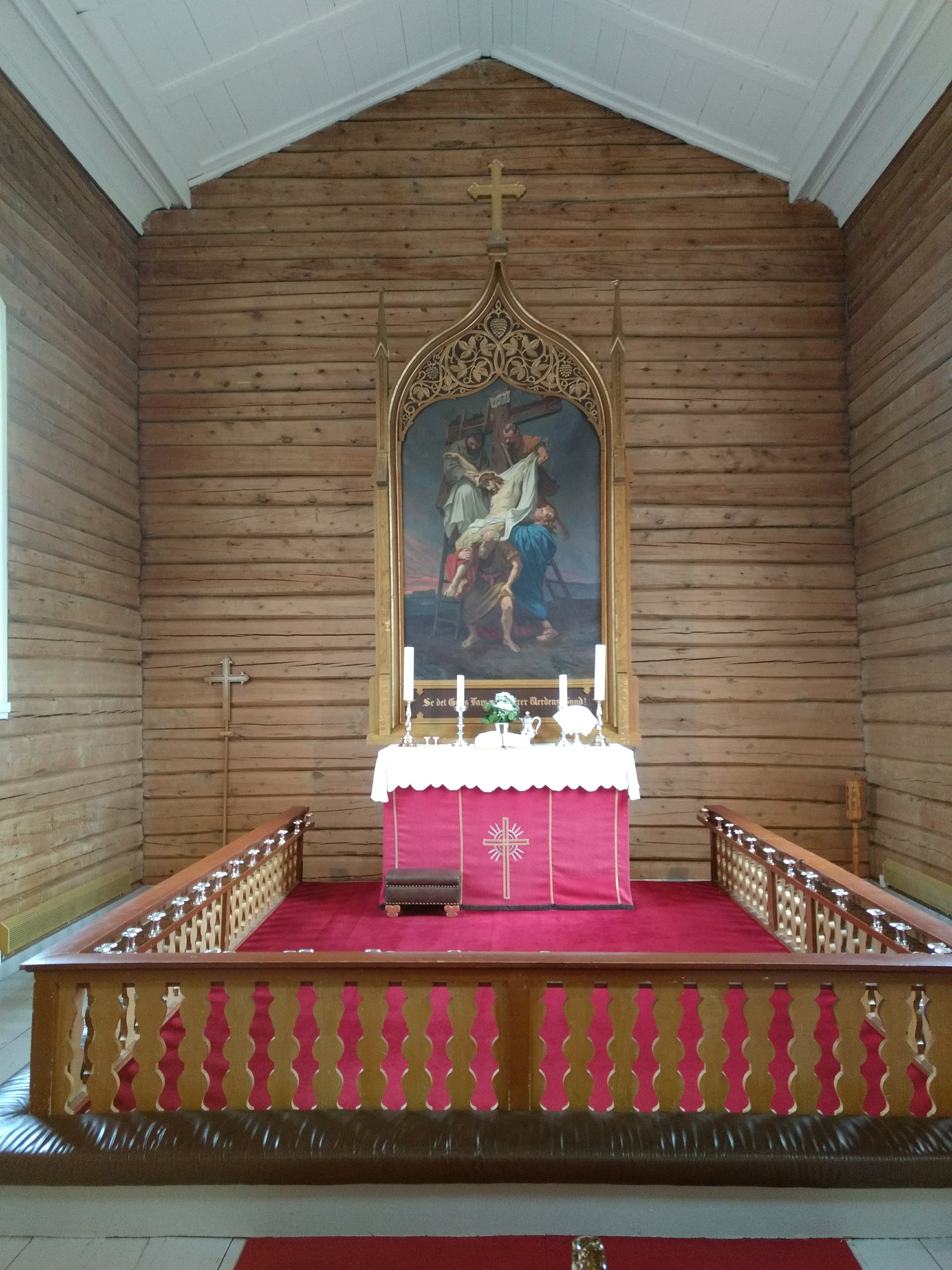

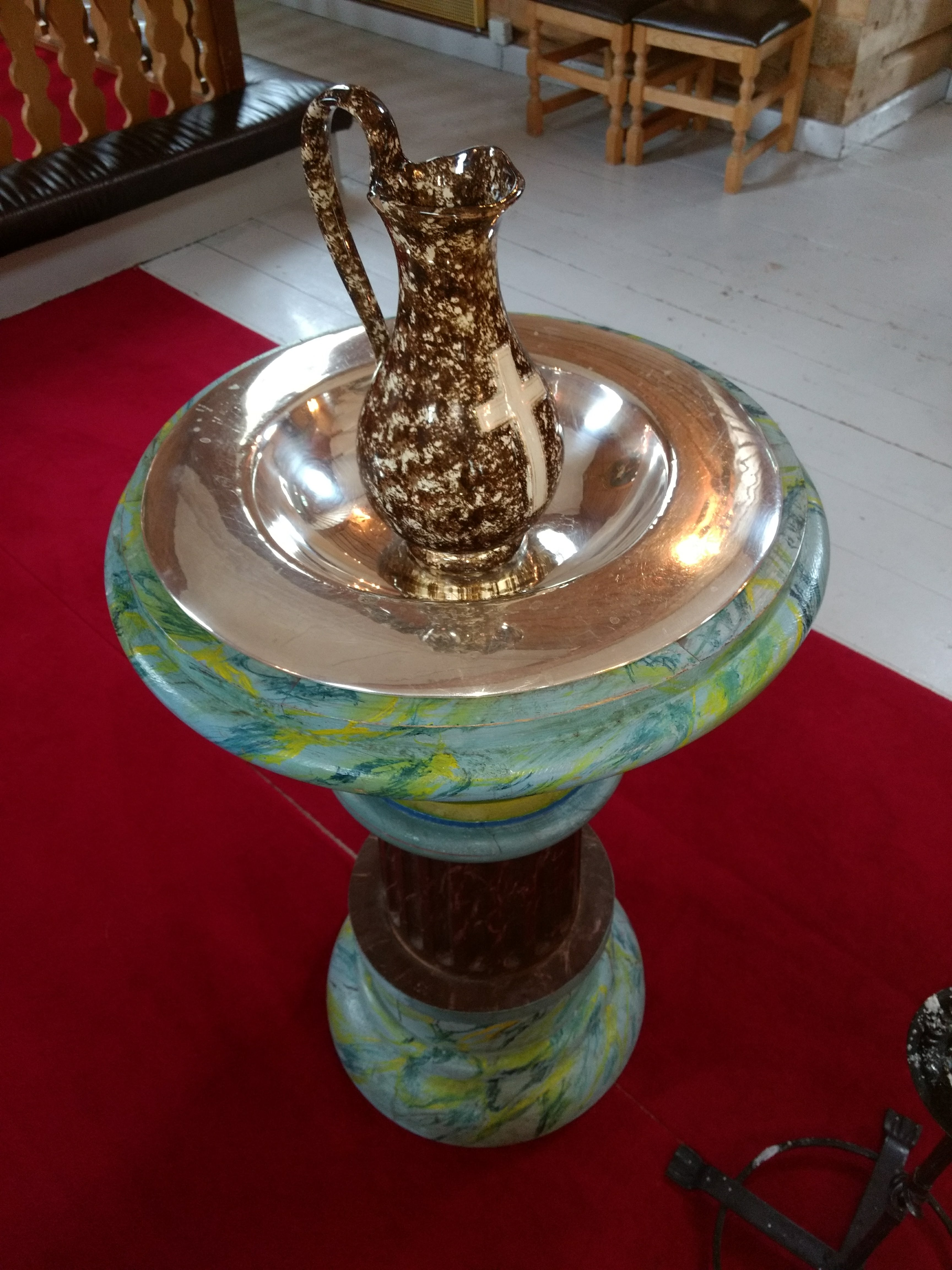

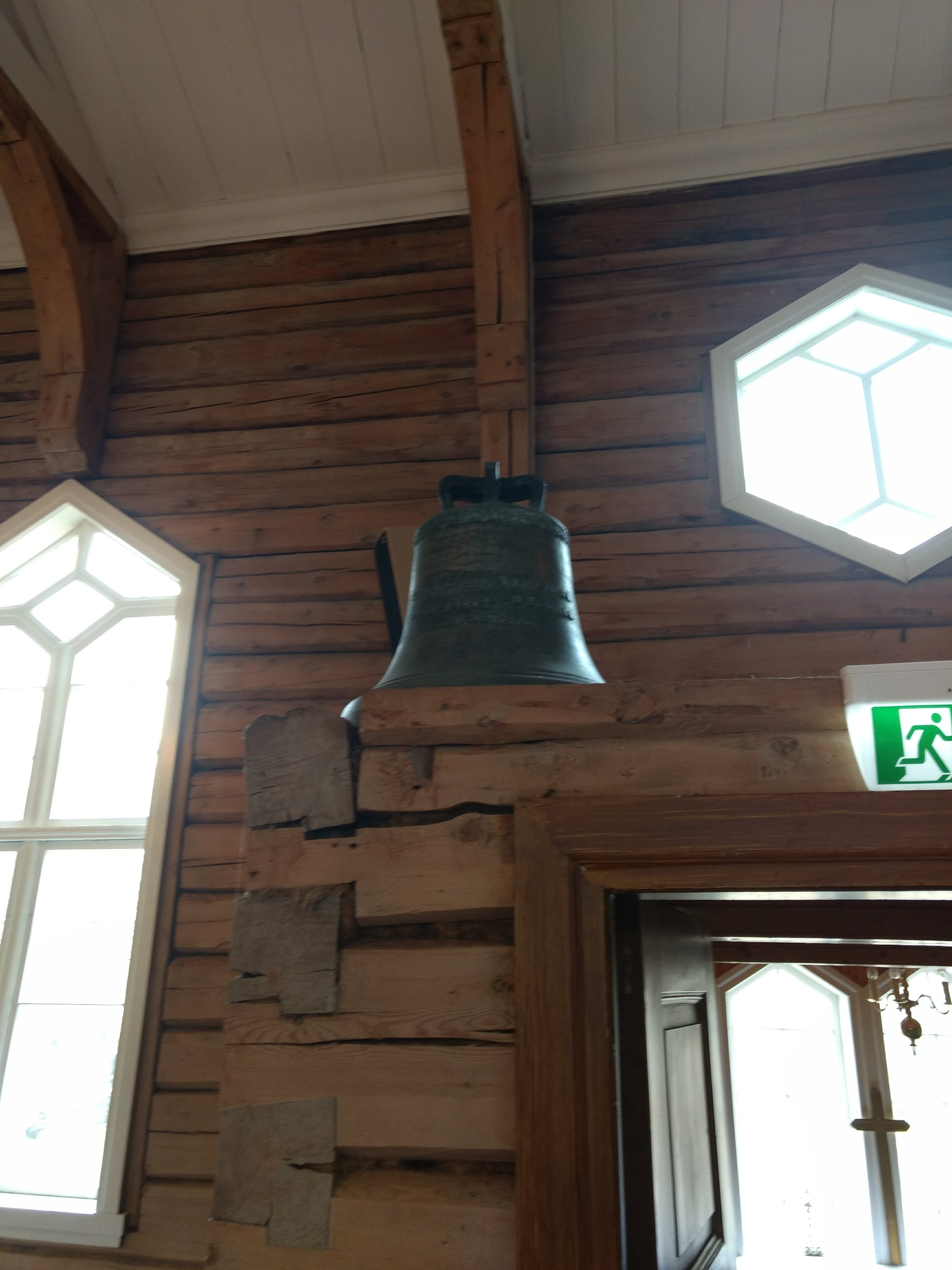

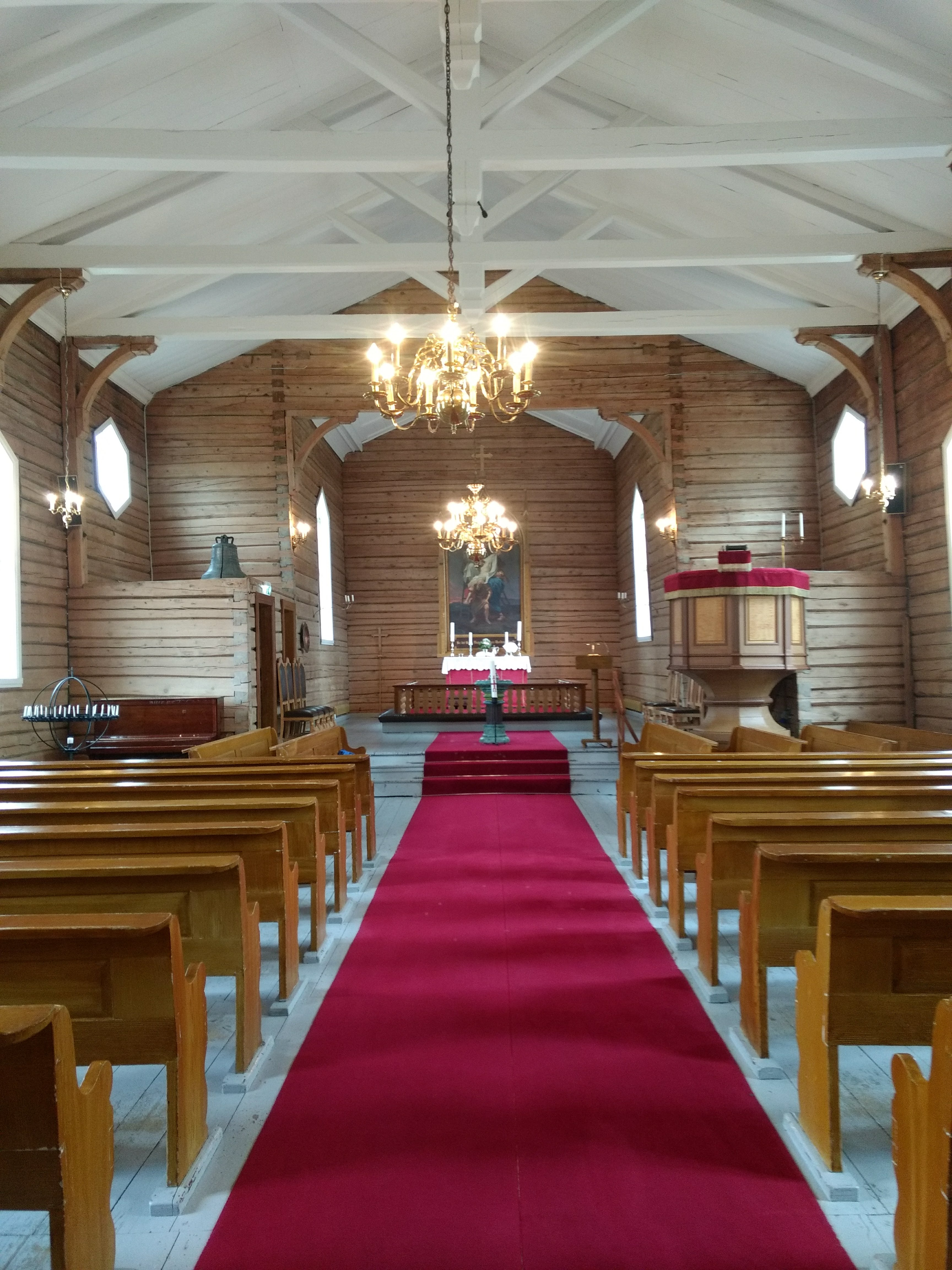

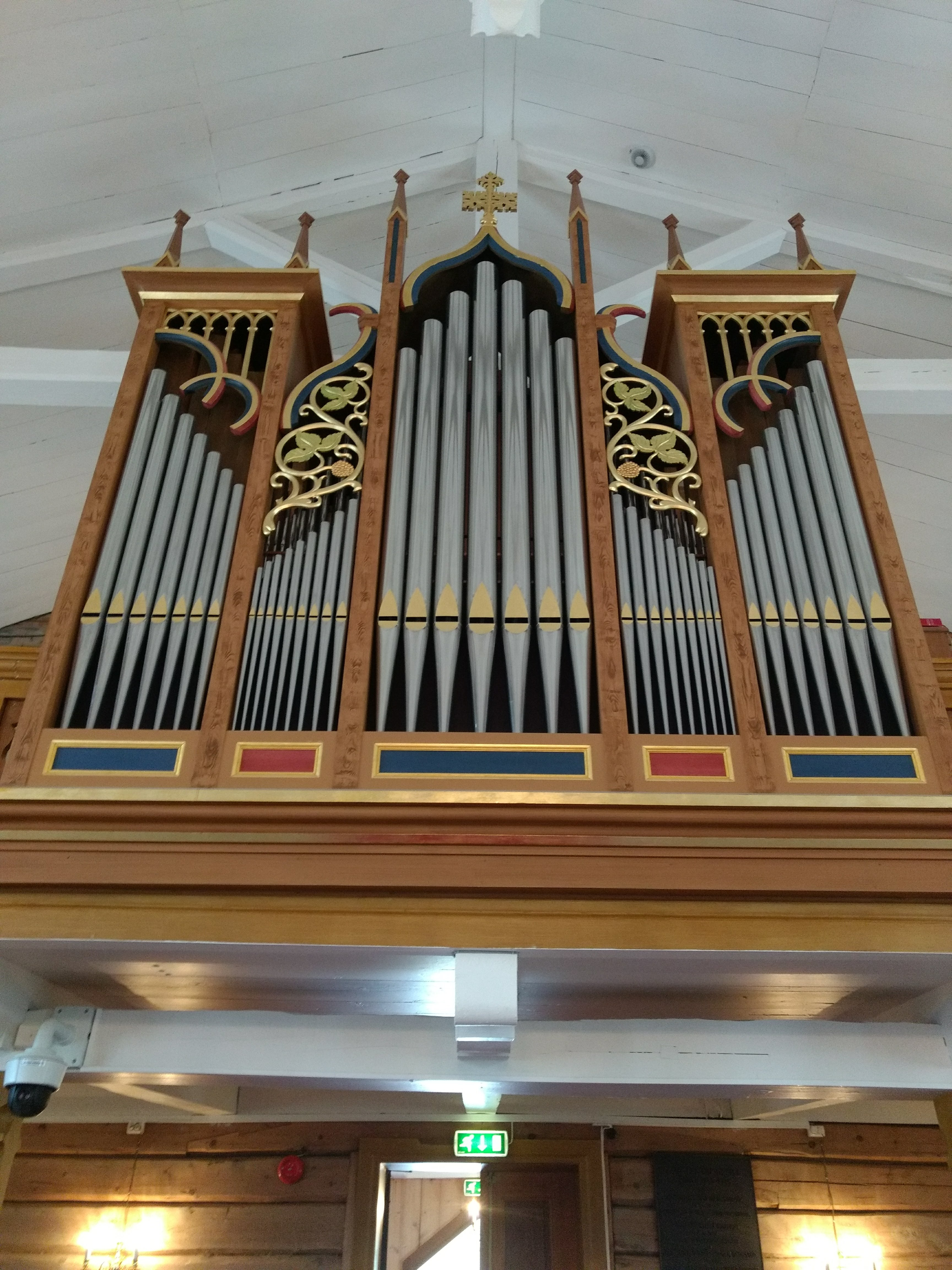

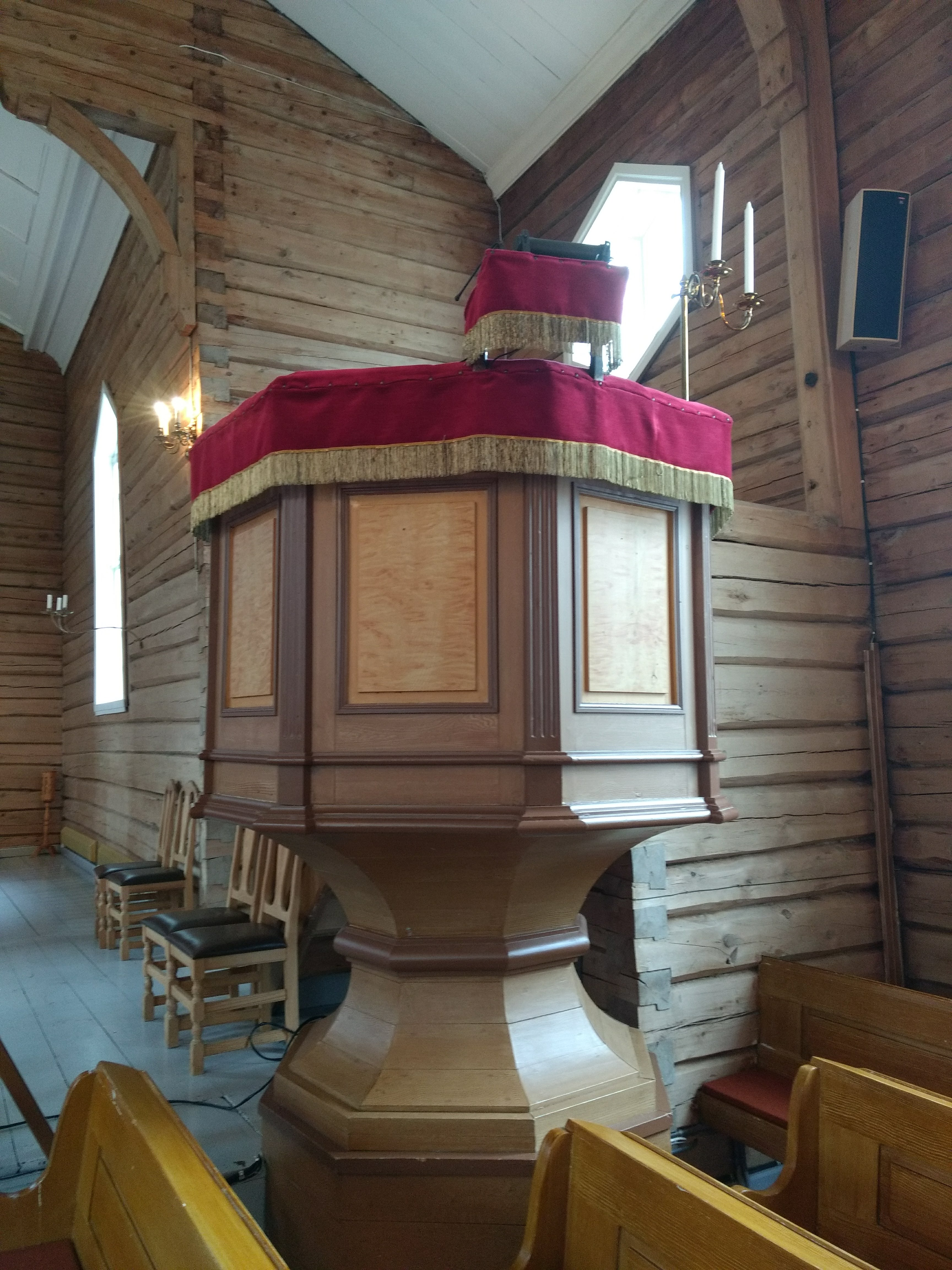

== See also ==
- List of churches in Nord-Hålogaland
