= Rotsund =

Rotsund (Norwegian); Guohcanuorri (Northern Sami); Nuora (Kven)
- Village
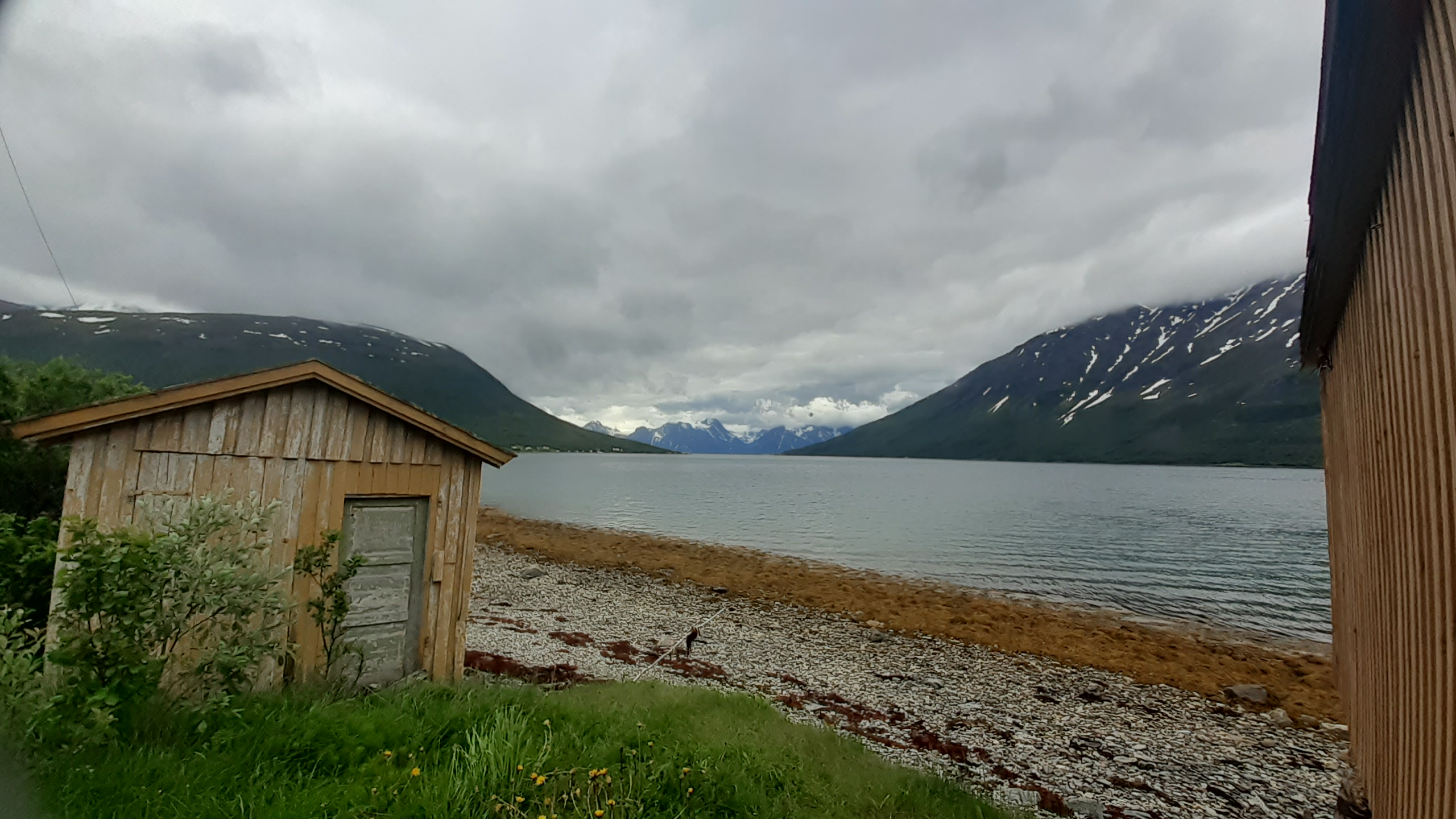
- View of the village
- Interactive map of: Rotsund (Norwegian); Guohcanuorri (Northern Sami); Nuora (Kven)
- Location within Troms Location within Norway
- Coordinates: 69°46′39″N 20°35′22″E
- Country: Norway
- Region: Northern Norway
- County: Troms
- District: Nord-Troms
- Municipality: Nordreisa Municipality
- Elevation: 4 m (13 ft)
- Time zone: UTC+01:00 (CET)
  - Summer (DST): UTC+02:00 (CEST)
- Post Code: 9153 Rotsund

Rotsund (Norwegian), Guohcanuorri (Northern Sami), or Nuora (Kven) is a village in Nordreisa Municipality in Troms county, Norway. The village is located along the Rotsundet strait, across from the island of Uløya. The village sits along the river Rotsundelva, along the European route E06 highway about 20 kilometres (12 mi) northwest of the municipal centre of Storslett. Rotsund Chapel is located in this village. On the western end of the village, there is a ferry port with regular ferry service to Hamnes and Klauvnes on the island of Uløya.
