= Anne Marie Blomstereng =

Norwegian politician (born 1940)

Anne Marie Blomstereng (born 12 July 1940 in Nordreisa) is a Norwegian politician for the Labour Party.

She served as a deputy representative to the Norwegian Parliament from Troms during the term 1989–1993.

On the local level, Blomstereng served as deputy mayor of Nordreisa Municipality from 1983 to 1995.
