= Nordreisa Municipality =

Municipality in Troms, Norway

Nordreisa Municipality Nordreisa kommune Ráissa suohkan Raisin komuuni
- Municipality
- Nordreisen herred (historic name)
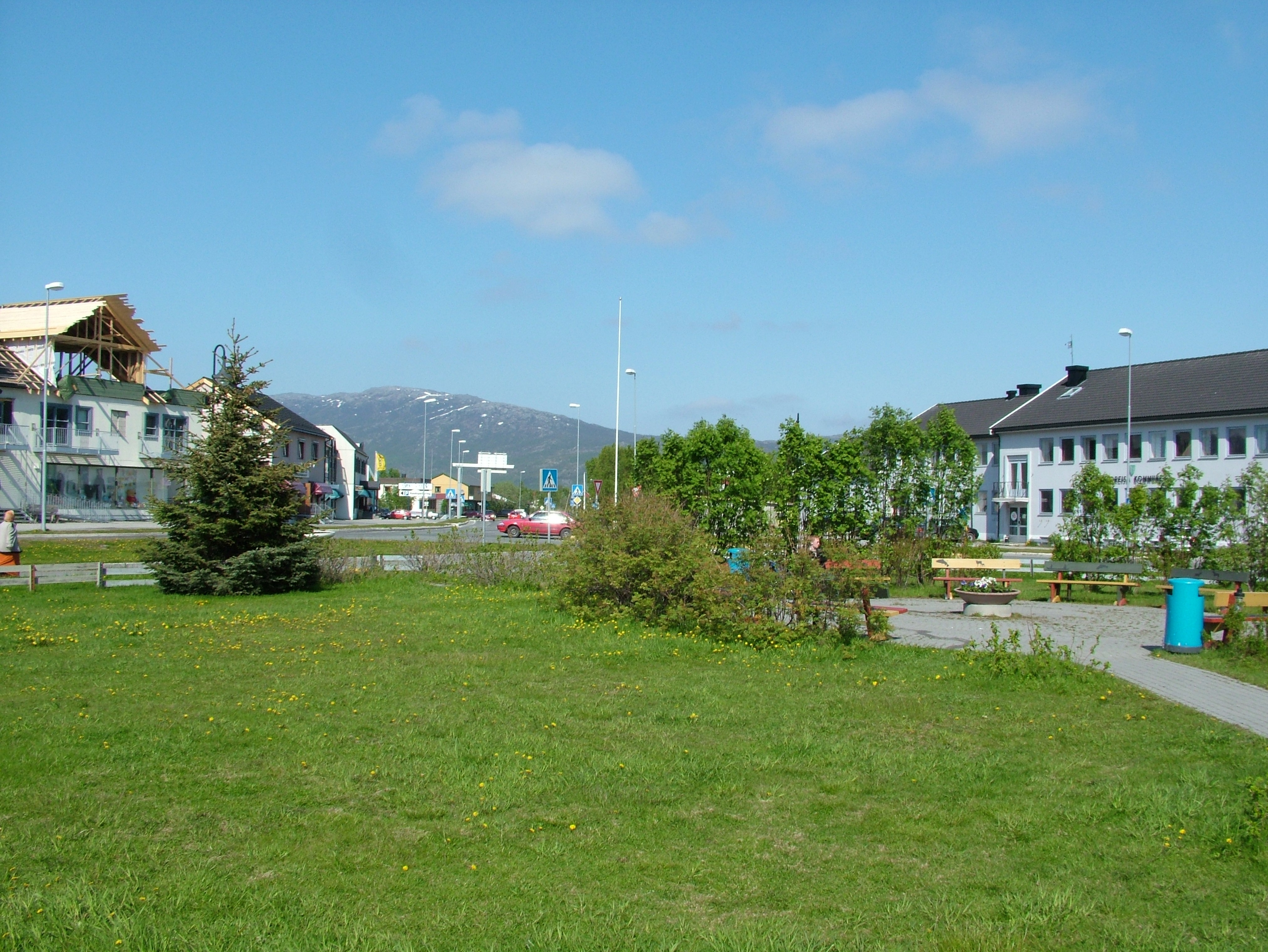
- View of Storslett

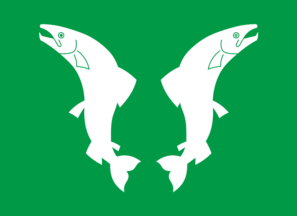
- Flag Coat of arms

- Troms within Norway

- Nordreisa within Troms
- Coordinates: 69°42′18″N 21°12′33″E
- Country: Norway
- County: Troms
- District: Nord-Troms
- Established: 1 Jan 1886
  - Preceded by: Skjervøy Municipality
- Administrative centre: Storslett

Government
  - Mayor (2019): Hilde Anita Nyvoll (Ap)

Area
  - Total: 3,437.77 km^{2} (1,327.33 sq mi)
  - Land: 3,334.04 km^{2} (1,287.28 sq mi)
  - Water: 103.73 km^{2} (40.05 sq mi) 3%
  - Rank: #9 in Norway
- Highest elevation: 1,360.59 m (4,463.9 ft)

Population (2024)
  - Total: 4,794
  - Rank: #187 in Norway
  - Density: 1.4/km^{2} (3.6/sq mi)
  - Change (10 years): ▼ −1.2%
- Demonym: Reisaværing

Official language
  - Norwegian form: Bokmål
- Time zone: UTC+01:00 (CET)
  - Summer (DST): UTC+02:00 (CEST)
- ISO 3166 code: NO-5544
- Website: Official website

Nordreisa (Norwegian), Ráisa (Northern Sami, pronounced [ˈraːjːsa]), or Raisi (Kven) is a municipality in Troms county, Norway. The administrative centre of the municipality is the village of Storslett. Other villages include Oksfjordhamn, Sørkjosen, and Rotsund.

The municipality consists of the Reisadalen valley, with the river Reisaelva and deep pine forests, surrounded by mountains and high plateaus. Most people live in Storslett, where the river meets the Reisafjorden. Sørkjosen, just northwest of Storslett, is the location of Sørkjosen Airport with flights to Tromsø and several destinations in Finnmark. The European route E6 runs through the northern part of the municipality.

The 3,438-square-kilometre (1,327 sq mi) municipality is the 9th largest by area out of the 357 municipalities in Norway. Nordreisa is the 187th most populous municipality in Norway with a population of 4,794. The municipality's population density is 1.4 inhabitants per square kilometre (3.6/sq mi) and its population has decreased by 1.2% over the previous 10-year period.

== General information ==
The municipality of Nordreisa was established on 1 January 1886 when Skjervøy Municipality was divided in two. The southern part of Skjervøy (population: 1,057) was separated to form the new municipality. On 1 January 1890, the Trætten and Loppevolden farms (population: 32) were transferred to Nordreisa from Skjervøy. The parts of Skjervøy lying on the mainland (population: 1,556) were transferred from Skjervøy to Nordreisa on 1 January 1972. On 1 January 1982, the southern part of the island of Uløya (population: 128) was transferred from Skjervøy to Nordreisa.

On 1 January 2020, the municipality became part of the newly formed Troms og Finnmark county. Previously, it had been part of the old Troms county. On 1 January 2024, the Troms og Finnmark county was divided and the municipality once again became part of Troms county.

=== Name ===
The municipality (originally the parish) is named after the local Reisafjorden (Old Norse: Reisa). The fjord was named after the river Reisaelva which flows into the fjord. The river name is derived from the verb rísa which means "to raise" (referring to flooding). The prefix nord (meaning "northern") was added to the name to distinguish the municipality from the nearby Sørreisa Municipality to the south. Historically, the name of the municipality was spelled Nordreisen. On 6 January 1908, a royal resolution changed the spelling of the name of the municipality to Nordreisa. In 2017, the municipality adopted co-equal, trilingual names for the municipality: Nordreisa (Norwegian), Ráisa (Northern Sami), and Raisi (Kven), and the government of Norway approved these in 2018. The spelling of the Sami and Kven language names change depending on how they are used. In Sami, it is called Ráisa when it is spelled alone, but it is Ráissa suohkan when using the Sami language equivalent to "Nordreisa Municipality". In Kven, it is called Raisi when it is spelled alone, but it is Raisin komuuni when using the Kven language equivalent to "Nordreisa Municipality".

=== Coat of arms ===
The coat of arms was granted on 21 December 1984. The official blazon is "Vert, two salmon haurient argent addorsed" (Norwegian: I grønt to adosserte sølv lakser). This means the arms have a green field (background) and the charge is two salmon. The salmon have a tincture of argent which means they are commonly colored white, but if it is made out of metal, then silver is used. The salmon was chosen to be on the arms because the local Reisaelva river is one of Norway's best salmon fishing rivers. The arms were designed by Arvid Sveen.

=== Churches ===
The Church of Norway has one parish (sokn) within Nordreisa Municipality. It is part of the Nord-Troms prosti (deanery) in the Diocese of Nord-Hålogaland.

Churches in Nordreisa Municipality
Parish (sokn)	Church name	Location of the church	Year built
Nordreisa	Nordreisa Church	Storslett	1856
Nordreisa	Rotsund Chapel	Rotsund	1932

== History ==
Most inhabitants are descendants of settlers from Finland who came over in the 18th century, escaping famine and war. Today, only a few old people can speak Finnish. Some inhabitants have Sami or Norwegian backgrounds, and today the Norwegian language is most commonly used.

Few old buildings survive in Nordreisa, as virtually everything was destroyed in early 1945 by retreating German troops. The two major attractions are the old trading post at Havnnes, with picturesque old houses that escaped the war damages, and the waterfall of Mollisfossen, which is 269 metres (883 ft) high. The upper, or southernmost, areas of the municipality are covered by the Reisa National Park with unique forest and high plateau vegetation.

== Government ==
Nordreisa Municipality is responsible for primary education (through 10th grade), outpatient health services, senior citizen services, welfare and other social services, zoning, economic development, and municipal roads and utilities. The municipality is governed by a municipal council of directly elected representatives. The mayor is indirectly elected by a vote of the municipal council. The municipality is under the jurisdiction of the Nord-Troms og Senja District Court and the Hålogaland Court of Appeal.

In the 2007 municipal elections, Nordreisa recorded the highest vote for the right-wing Progress Party in Norway at 49.3%.

=== Municipal council ===
The municipal council (Kommunestyre) of Nordreisa Municipality is made up of 21 representatives that are elected to four-year terms. The tables below show the current and historical composition of the council by political party.

Nordreisa kommunestyre 2023–2027
Party name (in Norwegian)	Number of representatives
Labour Party (Arbeiderpartiet)	5
Progress Party (Fremskrittspartiet)	4
Conservative Party (Høyre)	3
Industry and Business Party (Industri‑ og Næringspartiet)	3
Centre Party (Senterpartiet)	3
Socialist Left Party (Sosialistisk Venstreparti)	3
Total number of members:	21

Nordreisa kommunestyre 2019–2023
Party name (in Norwegian)	Number of representatives
Labour Party (Arbeiderpartiet)	5
Progress Party (Fremskrittspartiet)	3
Conservative Party (Høyre)	4
Christian Democratic Party (Kristelig Folkeparti)	2
Centre Party (Senterpartiet)	5
Socialist Left Party (Sosialistisk Venstreparti)	2
Total number of members:	21

Nordreisa kommunestyre 2015–2019
Party name (in Norwegian)	Number of representatives
Labour Party (Arbeiderpartiet)	6
Progress Party (Fremskrittspartiet)	3
Green Party (Miljøpartiet De Grønne)	1
Conservative Party (Høyre)	4
Christian Democratic Party (Kristelig Folkeparti)	3
Centre Party (Senterpartiet)	2
Socialist Left Party (Sosialistisk Venstreparti)	2
Total number of members:	21

Nordreisa kommunestyre 2011–2015
Party name (in Norwegian)	Number of representatives
Labour Party (Arbeiderpartiet)	9
Progress Party (Fremskrittspartiet)	4
Conservative Party (Høyre)	3
Christian Democratic Party (Kristelig Folkeparti)	2
Centre Party (Senterpartiet)	2
Socialist Left Party (Sosialistisk Venstreparti)	1
Total number of members:	21

Nordreisa kommunestyre 2007–2011
Party name (in Norwegian)	Number of representatives
Labour Party (Arbeiderpartiet)	5
Progress Party (Fremskrittspartiet)	10
Conservative Party (Høyre)	1
Christian Democratic Party (Kristelig Folkeparti)	1
Centre Party (Senterpartiet)	2
Socialist Left Party (Sosialistisk Venstreparti)	2
Total number of members:	21

Nordreisa kommunestyre 2003–2007
Party name (in Norwegian)	Number of representatives
Labour Party (Arbeiderpartiet)	6
Progress Party (Fremskrittspartiet)	7
Conservative Party (Høyre)	3
Christian Democratic Party (Kristelig Folkeparti)	1
Centre Party (Senterpartiet)	2
Socialist Left Party (Sosialistisk Venstreparti)	2
Total number of members:	21

Nordreisa kommunestyre 1999–2003
Party name (in Norwegian)	Number of representatives
Labour Party (Arbeiderpartiet)	9
Progress Party (Fremskrittspartiet)	5
Conservative Party (Høyre)	3
Christian Democratic Party (Kristelig Folkeparti)	3
Centre Party (Senterpartiet)	2
Socialist Left Party (Sosialistisk Venstreparti)	4
Cross-party list (Tverrpolitisk liste)	3
Total number of members:	29

Nordreisa kommunestyre 1995–1999
Party name (in Norwegian)	Number of representatives
Labour Party (Arbeiderpartiet)	12
Conservative Party (Høyre)	3
Christian Democratic Party (Kristelig Folkeparti)	3
Centre Party (Senterpartiet)	5
Socialist Left Party (Sosialistisk Venstreparti)	2
Cross-party list (Tverrpolitisk liste)	4
Total number of members:	29

Nordreisa kommunestyre 1991–1995
Party name (in Norwegian)	Number of representatives
Labour Party (Arbeiderpartiet)	11
Conservative Party (Høyre)	3
Christian Democratic Party (Kristelig Folkeparti)	3
Centre Party (Senterpartiet)	3
Socialist Left Party (Sosialistisk Venstreparti)	3
Cross-party list (Tverrpolitisk liste)	4
Election list for Oksfjord and Straumfjord (Valgliste for Oksfjord og Straumfjord)	2
Total number of members:	29

Nordreisa kommunestyre 1987–1991
Party name (in Norwegian)	Number of representatives
Labour Party (Arbeiderpartiet)	15
Conservative Party (Høyre)	4
Christian Democratic Party (Kristelig Folkeparti)	3
Centre Party (Senterpartiet)	1
Socialist Left Party (Sosialistisk Venstreparti)	2
Liberal Party (Venstre)	1
Cross-party list (Tverrpolitisk liste)	3
Total number of members:	29

Nordreisa kommunestyre 1983–1987
Party name (in Norwegian)	Number of representatives
Labour Party (Arbeiderpartiet)	17
Conservative Party (Høyre)	4
Christian Democratic Party (Kristelig Folkeparti)	3
Centre Party (Senterpartiet)	2
Socialist Left Party (Sosialistisk Venstreparti)	2
Liberal Party (Venstre)	1
Total number of members:	29

Nordreisa kommunestyre 1979–1983
Party name (in Norwegian)	Number of representatives
Labour Party (Arbeiderpartiet)	14
Conservative Party (Høyre)	6
Christian Democratic Party (Kristelig Folkeparti)	3
Centre Party (Senterpartiet)	4
Socialist Left Party (Sosialistisk Venstreparti)	2
Total number of members:	29

Nordreisa kommunestyre 1975–1979
Party name (in Norwegian)	Number of representatives
Labour Party (Arbeiderpartiet)	14
Conservative Party (Høyre)	6
Christian Democratic Party (Kristelig Folkeparti)	2
Centre Party (Senterpartiet)	5
Socialist Left Party (Sosialistisk Venstreparti)	1
Liberal Party (Venstre)	1
Total number of members:	29

Nordreisa kommunestyre 1971–1975
Party name (in Norwegian)	Number of representatives
Labour Party (Arbeiderpartiet)	16
Conservative Party (Høyre)	3
Centre Party (Senterpartiet)	2
Socialist People's Party (Sosialistisk Folkeparti)	2
Liberal Party (Venstre)	5
Local List(s) (Lokale lister)	1
Total number of members:	29

Nordreisa kommunestyre 1967–1971
Party name (in Norwegian)	Number of representatives
Labour Party (Arbeiderpartiet)	9
Conservative Party (Høyre)	3
Centre Party (Senterpartiet)	2
Socialist People's Party (Sosialistisk Folkeparti)	1
Liberal Party (Venstre)	3
List of workers, fishermen, and small farmholders (Arbeidere, fiskere, småbrukere liste)	3
Total number of members:	21

Nordreisa kommunestyre 1963–1967
Party name (in Norwegian)	Number of representatives
Labour Party (Arbeiderpartiet)	11
Conservative Party (Høyre)	3
Communist Party (Kommunistiske Parti)	1
Centre Party (Senterpartiet)	3
Socialist People's Party (Sosialistisk Folkeparti)	1
Liberal Party (Venstre)	2
Total number of members:	21

Nordreisa herredsstyre 1959–1963
Party name (in Norwegian)	Number of representatives
Labour Party (Arbeiderpartiet)	11
Communist Party (Kommunistiske Parti)	2
List of workers, fishermen, and small farmholders (Arbeidere, fiskere, småbrukere liste)	2
Joint List(s) of Non-Socialist Parties (Borgerlige Felleslister)	6
Total number of members:	21

Nordreisa herredsstyre 1955–1959
Party name (in Norwegian)	Number of representatives
Labour Party (Arbeiderpartiet)	10
Communist Party (Kommunistiske Parti)	4
List of workers, fishermen, and small farmholders (Arbeidere, fiskere, småbrukere liste)	3
Joint List(s) of Non-Socialist Parties (Borgerlige Felleslister)	4
Total number of members:	21

Nordreisa herredsstyre 1951–1955
Party name (in Norwegian)	Number of representatives
Labour Party (Arbeiderpartiet)	5
Communist Party (Kommunistiske Parti)	3
Local List(s) (Lokale lister)	8
Total number of members:	16

Nordreisa herredsstyre 1947–1951
Party name (in Norwegian)	Number of representatives
Labour Party (Arbeiderpartiet)	7
Communist Party (Kommunistiske Parti)	5
Local List(s) (Lokale lister)	4
Total number of members:	16

Nordreisa herredsstyre 1945–1947
Party name (in Norwegian)	Number of representatives
Labour Party (Arbeiderpartiet)	6
Communist Party (Kommunistiske Parti)	6
List of workers, fishermen, and small farmholders (Arbeidere, fiskere, småbrukere liste)	4
Total number of members:	16

Nordreisa herredsstyre 1937–1941*
Party name (in Norwegian)	Number of representatives
Labour Party (Arbeiderpartiet)	9
List of workers, fishermen, and small farmholders (Arbeidere, fiskere, småbrukere liste)	3
Local List(s) (Lokale lister)	4
Total number of members:	16
Note: Due to the German occupation of Norway during World War II, no elections were held for new municipal councils until after the war ended in 1945.

=== Mayors ===
The mayor (Norwegian: ordfører) of Nordreisa Municipality is the political leader of the municipality and the chairperson of the municipal council. Here is a list of people who have held this position:

- 1886–1890: Peder Borch Lund (V)
- 1891–1892: Ole Martin Gausdal (V)
- 1893–1895: Johan Olai Bakkeslett
- 1896–1898: Bertel Nilsen Sokkelvik
- 1899–1901: Johan Olai Bakkeslett
- 1902–1904: Bertel Nilsen Sokkelvik
- 1905–1907: Olaus Johnsen Snemyr
- 1908–1935: Leonhard Isachsen (Ap)
- 1935–1940: Lars Storslett (Ap)
- 1941–1942: Harald Lund Sørkjosen
- 1943–1945: Sigurd Gjetmundsen Skogstad
- 1945–1951: Håkon Henriksen (NKP)
- 1952–1955: Ove Myrland (Ap)
- 1956–1963: Arthur Elvestad (Ap)
- 1964–1969: Hjalmar Molund (Ap)
- 1970–1979: Arthur Elvestad (Ap)
- 1980–1991: Arne Pedersen (Ap)
- 1992–2003: Torbjørn Evanger (Ap)
- 2003–2011: John Karlsen (FrP)
- 2011–2015: Lidvart Jakobsen (Ap)
- 2015–2019: Øyvind Evanger (Ap)
- 2019–present: Hilde Anita Nyvoll (Ap)

== Geography ==
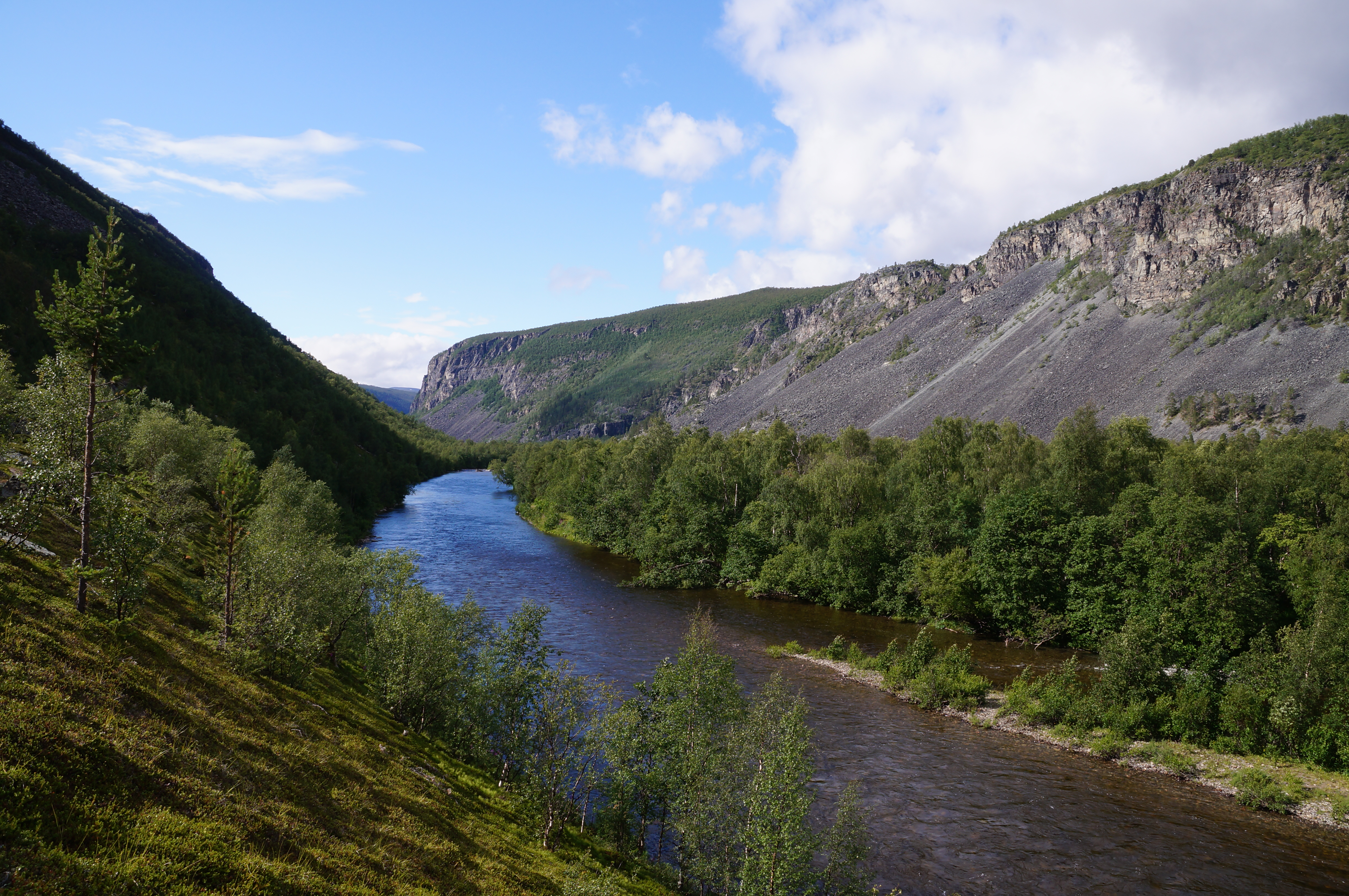
Reisa river, Reisadalen (valley)

Nordreisa Municipality is located around the Reisafjorden and the Reisadalen valley. The municipality also includes the southern part of the island of Uløya. The Lyngen fjord lies on the northwestern edge of the municipality. The islands of Skjervøy Municipality lie to the north; Kvænangen Municipality and Kautokeino Municipality are both located to the east; Finland is to the south; and Gáivuotna–Kåfjord Municipality and Lyngen Municipality are located to the west. The highest point in the municipality is the 1,360.6-metre (4,464 ft) tall mountain Halti., located in the southern part of the municipality, near Reisa National Park.

=== Climate ===
Nordreisa has a boreal climate, although with autumn as the wettest season. The wettest month, October, sees almost three times as much precipitation as the driest month, April. The all-time high 31.6 °C (88.9 °F) was recorded August 2018. On 23. March 2025, Sørkjosen Airport set a new March all-time high for Troms county with 14.4 °C (57.9 °F). The weather station near the small airport has been recording since 1974.

Climate data for Sørkjosen Airport, Nordreisa 1991-2020 (6 m, extremes 2005-2024)
Month	Jan	Feb	Mar	Apr	May	Jun	Jul	Aug	Sep	Oct	Nov	Dec	Year
Record high °C (°F)	10.6 (51.1)	12.6 (54.7)	14.4 (57.9)	16.8 (62.2)	24.5 (76.1)	31.2 (88.2)	30.7 (87.3)	31.6 (88.9)	22.8 (73.0)	19.2 (66.6)	16.4 (61.5)	14.2 (57.6)	31.6 (88.9)
Daily mean °C (°F)	−4.9 (23.2)	−5.2 (22.6)	−2.6 (27.3)	1.4 (34.5)	6.1 (43.0)	9.9 (49.8)	13 (55)	12 (54)	8.4 (47.1)	2.9 (37.2)	−1.3 (29.7)	−3.2 (26.2)	3.0 (37.5)
Record low °C (°F)	−22.5 (−8.5)	−26.6 (−15.9)	−18.6 (−1.5)	−12.9 (8.8)	−4.5 (23.9)	0.1 (32.2)	3 (37)	−0.2 (31.6)	−2.5 (27.5)	−11.9 (10.6)	−19.1 (−2.4)	−18.8 (−1.8)	−26.6 (−15.9)
Average precipitation mm (inches)	78 (3.1)	56.2 (2.21)	69.3 (2.73)	37.4 (1.47)	45.3 (1.78)	58.9 (2.32)	61.8 (2.43)	75.6 (2.98)	89.1 (3.51)	99 (3.9)	68.2 (2.69)	69.9 (2.75)	808.7 (31.87)
Source 1: Norwegian Meteorological Institute
Source 2: yr.no/met.no

Climate data for Storslett 1961-1990
Month	Jan	Feb	Mar	Apr	May	Jun	Jul	Aug	Sep	Oct	Nov	Dec	Year
Mean daily maximum °C (°F)	−4.3 (24.3)	−3.6 (25.5)	−0.8 (30.6)	3.5 (38.3)	8.3 (46.9)	13.3 (55.9)	16.1 (61.0)	14.6 (58.3)	10.2 (50.4)	4.4 (39.9)	−0.4 (31.3)	−3.1 (26.4)	4.9 (40.8)
Daily mean °C (°F)	−8.0 (17.6)	−7.4 (18.7)	−4.6 (23.7)	−0.1 (31.8)	5.1 (41.2)	9.7 (49.5)	12.6 (54.7)	11.3 (52.3)	6.8 (44.2)	1.8 (35.2)	−3.5 (25.7)	−6.6 (20.1)	1.4 (34.5)
Mean daily minimum °C (°F)	−12.2 (10.0)	−11.4 (11.5)	−8.8 (16.2)	−4.0 (24.8)	1.3 (34.3)	5.9 (42.6)	8.7 (47.7)	7.6 (45.7)	3.5 (38.3)	−1.3 (29.7)	−6.9 (19.6)	−10.5 (13.1)	−2.3 (27.9)
Average precipitation mm (inches)	59 (2.3)	50 (2.0)	42 (1.7)	34 (1.3)	34 (1.3)	45 (1.8)	60 (2.4)	64 (2.5)	62 (2.4)	80 (3.1)	65 (2.6)	67 (2.6)	662 (26.1)
Average precipitation days (≥ 1 mm)	10.3	9.8	9.1	7.8	8.2	9.8	11.3	11.4	11.8	12.6	11.6	11.3	125.0
Source: Norwegian Meteorological Institute

== Notable people ==
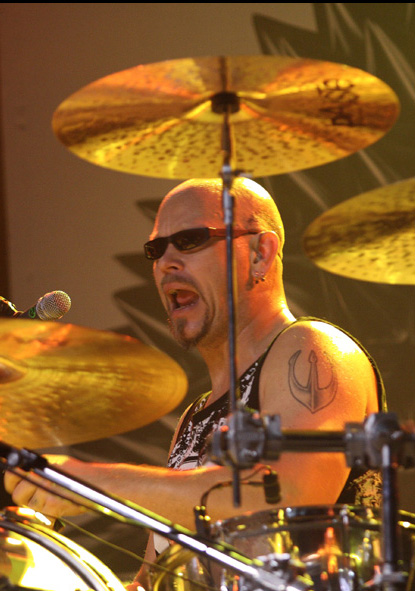
Ian Haugland, 2011

- Anne Marie Blomstereng (born 1940 in Nordreisa), a Norwegian politician who was deputy mayor of Nordreisa from 1983 to 1995
- Ian Haugland (born 1964 in Storslett), the drummer in the Swedish rock band Europe
- Thomas Braaten (born 1987 in Nordreisa), a football defender with over 300 club caps
- Ruben Kristiansen (born 1988 in Nordreisa), a Norwegian international footballer with over 200 club caps
- Eirik Høgbakk, a professional football player
- Bjørn Arne Olsen, an actor in the movie Titanic

== Gallery ==
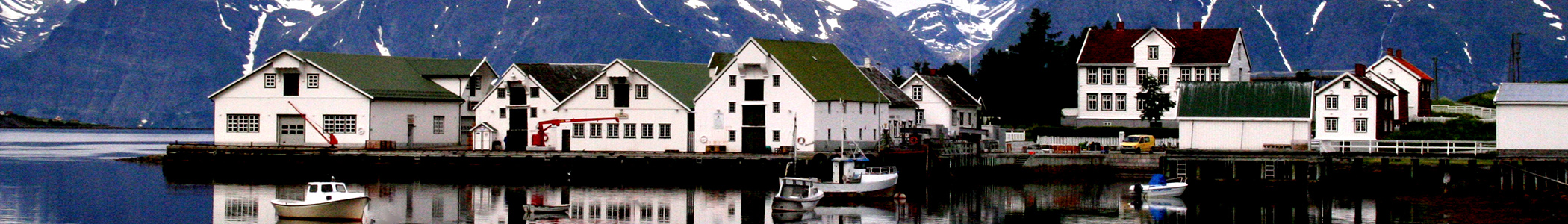
Havnnes
