= Uløya =

Island in Troms, Norway

Uløya (Norwegian) Ulisuolu (Northern Sami)
- Interactive map of Uløya (Norwegian); Ulisuolu (Northern Sami)

Geography
- Location: Troms, Norway
- Coordinates: 69.8619°N 20.6164°E
- Area: 78 km^{2} (30 sq mi)
- Length: 15 km (9.3 mi)
- Width: 8.5 km (5.28 mi)
- Coastline: 38 km (23.6 mi)
- Highest elevation: 1,142 m (3747 ft)
- Highest point: Blåtinden

Administration
- Norway
- County: Troms
- Municipality: Skjervøy and Nordreisa

Demographics
- Population: 94 (2001)
- Pop. density: 1.2/km^{2} (3.1/sq mi)

Uløya (Norwegian) or Ulisuolu (Northern Sami) is an island in Troms county, Norway. The island is situated on the east side of the Lyngen fjord and it is divided between Skjervøy Municipality and Nordreisa Municipality. The island has an area of 78 km^{2} (30 sq mi), and the highest point is Blåtinden at 1,142 m (3,747 ft). The population (2001) on the Skjervøy part of the island is 29, and the population (2001) on the Nordreisa part is 65. The two sides of the island are not connected by road.

Uløya is the 56th largest island in Norway. All of the island of Uløya was originally in Skjervøy Municipality, but in 1972 the southern part of the island was transferred to neighboring Nordreisa Municipality.

The village of Havnnes is located on the island.

== See also ==
- List of islands of Norway by area
- List of islands of Norway
