= Sørkjosen =

Sørkjosen (Norwegian); Reaššegeahči (Northern Sami); Rässikäinen (Kven)
- Village
- Interactive map of: Sørkjosen (Norwegian); Reaššegeahči (Northern Sami); Rässikäinen (Kven)
- Location within Troms Location within Norway
- Coordinates: 69°47′09″N 20°57′01″E
- Country: Norway
- Region: Northern Norway
- County: Troms
- District: Nord-Troms
- Municipality: Nordreisa Municipality

Area
  - Total: 0.80 km^{2} (0.31 sq mi)
- Elevation: 7 m (23 ft)

Population (2023)
  - Total: 814
  - Density: 1,018/km^{2} (2,640/sq mi)
- Time zone: UTC+01:00 (CET)
  - Summer (DST): UTC+02:00 (CEST)
- Post Code: 9152 Sørkjosen

Sørkjosen (Norwegian), Reaššegeahči (Northern Sami), or Rässikäinen (Kven) is a village in Nordreisa Municipality in Troms county, Norway. The village is located along the shores of the Reisafjorden about 5 kilometres (3.1 mi) northwest of the municipal center of Storslett. Sørkjosen has many industries including fishing, dairy production, and a sawmill.

The 0.8-square-kilometre (200-acre) village has a population (2023) of 814 which gives the village a population density of 1,018 inhabitants per square kilometre (2,640/sq mi).

== Nord-Troms Museum ==
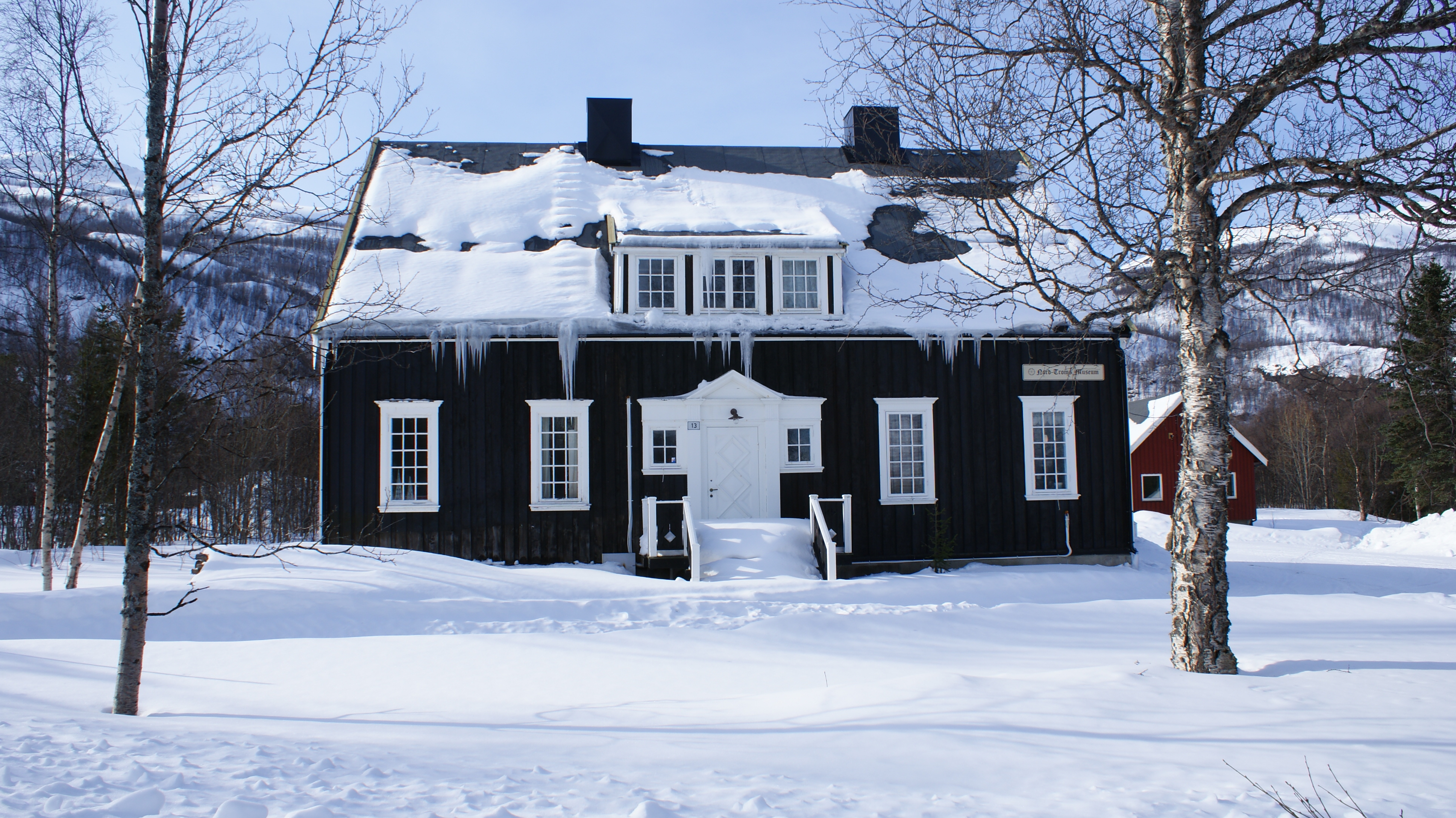
Nord-Troms Museum in Sørkjosen: one of the historical buildings

Sørkjosen hosts several preserved historical buildings that are part of the Nord-Troms Museum. The other exhibitions are located at facilities in neighboring municipalities of Lyngen, Storfjord, Kåfjord, Skjervøy, and Kvænangen.

== Transport ==
The European route E6 highway connects Sørkjosen with the town of Alta (and the rest of Finnmark county) to the east, and the city of Tromsø to the west. Sørkjosen Airport is located within the urban area of the village, on the shore of Reisafjorden, at its southern end. Widerøe provides air services to Tromsø, Hammerfest, and Kirkenes from Sørkjosen.
