= Storslett =

Storslett (Norwegian); Hánssagieddi (Northern Sami); Hansinkenttä (Kven)
- Village
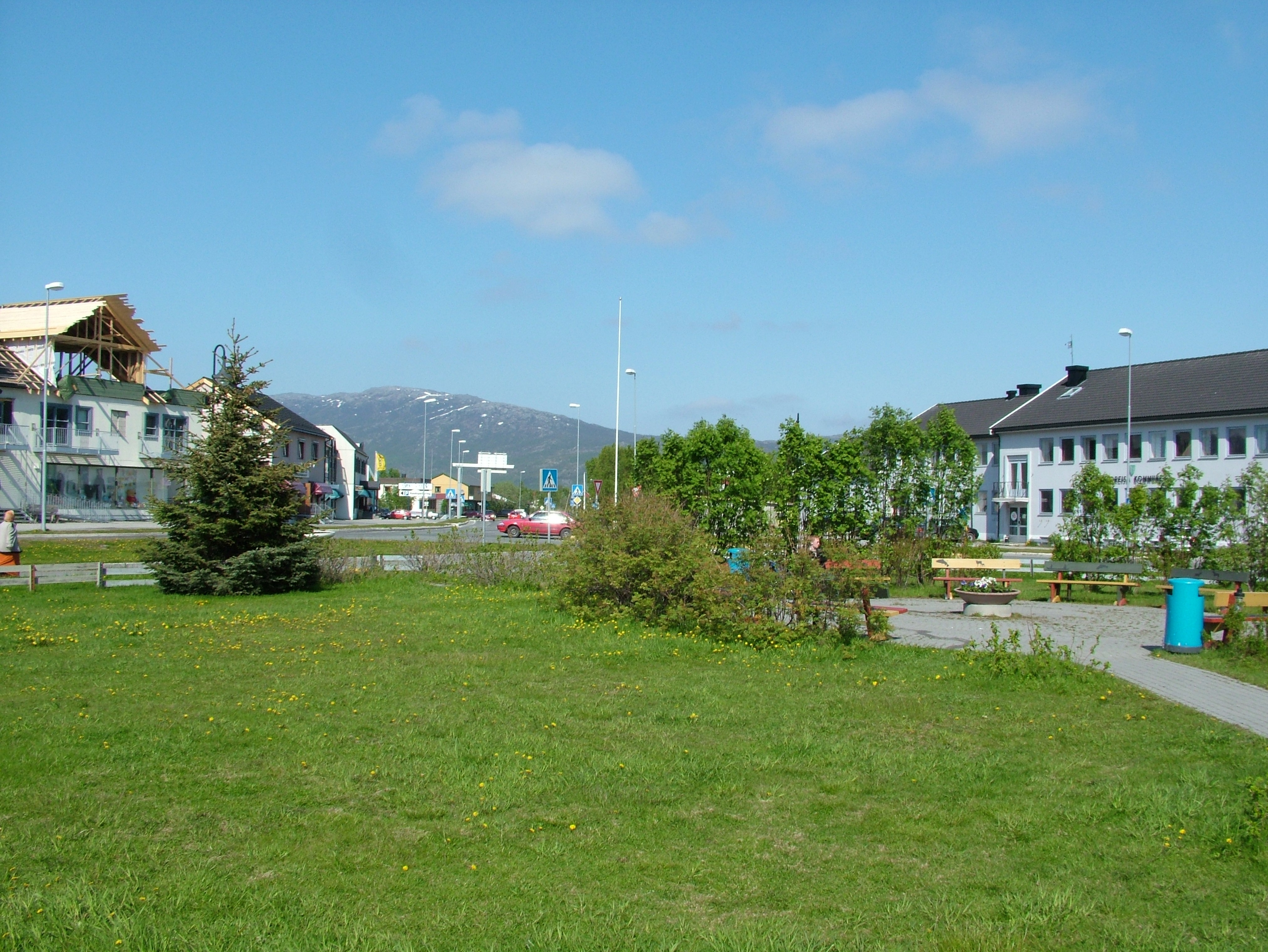
- View of the village
- Interactive map of: Storslett (Norwegian); Hánssagieddi (Northern Sami); Hansinkenttä (Kven)
- Location within Troms Location within Norway
- Coordinates: 69°46′05″N 21°01′28″E
- Country: Norway
- Region: Northern Norway
- County: Troms
- District: Nord-Troms
- Municipality: Nordreisa Municipality

Area
  - Total: 1.64 km^{2} (0.63 sq mi)
- Elevation: 2 m (6.6 ft)

Population (2023)
  - Total: 1,830
  - Density: 1,116/km^{2} (2,890/sq mi)
- Time zone: UTC+01:00 (CET)
  - Summer (DST): UTC+02:00 (CEST)
- Post Code: 9151 Storslett

Storslett (Norwegian), Hánssagieddi (Northern Sami), or Hansinkenttä (Kven) is the administrative centre of Nordreisa Municipality in Troms county, Norway. The village is located at the southern end of the Reisafjorden along the mouth of the river Reisaelva. The 1.64-square-kilometre (410-acre) village has a population (2023) of 1,830 which gives the village a population density of 1,116 inhabitants per square kilometre (2,890/sq mi).

Nordreisa Church and Nordreisa's upper secondary school are located in Storslett. The small Sørkjosen Airport is located in the neighboring village of Sørkjosen, about 5 km (3.1 mi) to the northwest. The European route E6 highway passes through this village.

Storslett was completely destroyed during World War II in 1944 at the end of the occupation of Norway by Nazi Germany; however, the village area was completely rebuilt and has had strong growth since the war.
