= Reisa National Park =

National park in Nordreisa, Norway

- Norwegian: Reisa nasjonalpark Northern Sami: Ráissa álbmotlaš meahcci
- IUCN category II (national park)

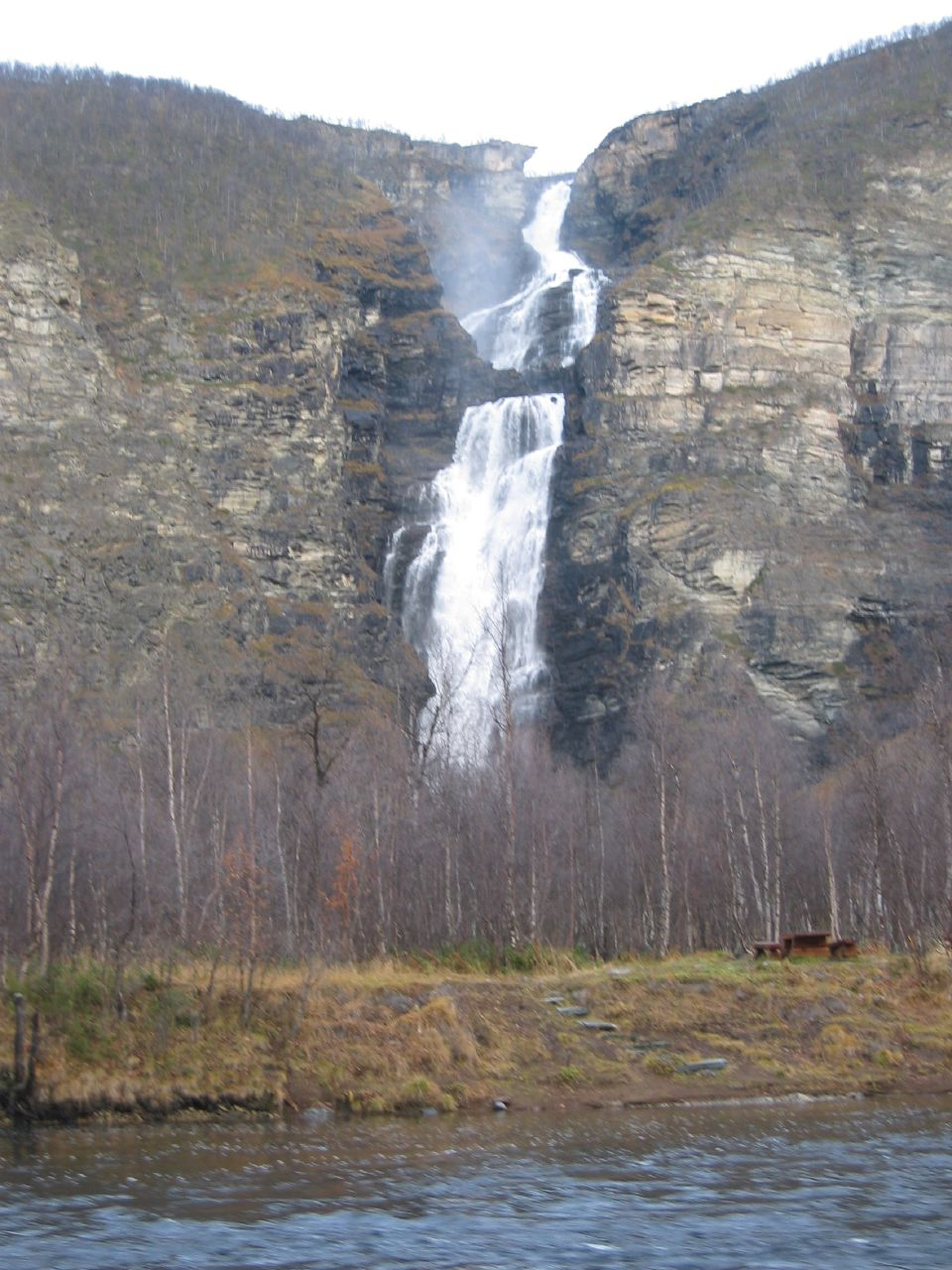
- Mollisfossen waterfall
- Interactive map of Reisa National Park
- Location: Nordreisa, Troms, Norway
- Nearest city: Storslett, Kautokeino
- Coordinates: 69°12′N 21°58′E
- Area: 803 km^{2} (310 sq mi)
- Established: 28 November 1986
- Governing body: Directorate for Nature Management

Reisa National Park (Norwegian: Reisa nasjonalpark; Northern Sami: Ráissa álbmotlaš meahcci) is a national park in Nordreisa Municipality in Troms county, Norway that was established by royal decree on 28 November 1986. The park has much wildlife. The rough-legged buzzard is the most common bird of prey, but hikers may also spot golden eagle, common kestrels, and gyrfalcon. Wolverines and Eurasian lynx live in the park and surrounding mountains. The Sámi name for part of the gorge, Njállaávzi, means Arctic fox gorge, suggesting that the Arctic fox must have lived there a long time. The largest Norwegian predator, the brown bear, is occasionally seen in the park.

The Reisa river has cut a valley and a canyon (north of Imo) in the mountain plateau, producing the long fertile valley called Reisadalen. Waterfalls cascade into the valleys and gorges. The waterfall Mollisfossen is one of the more spectacular falls at 269 metres (883 ft) in height.

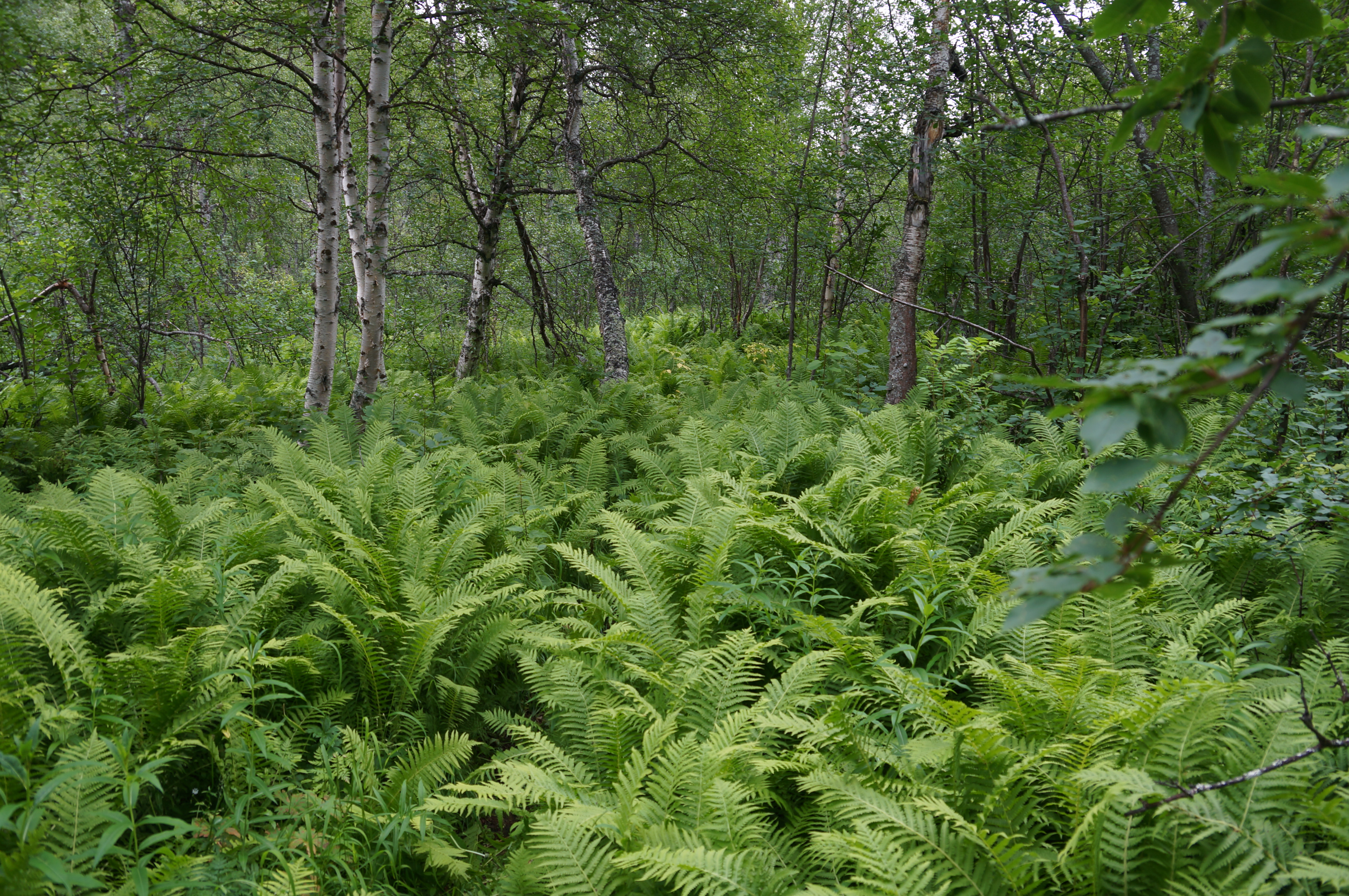
Birch forest and ferns in Reisa National Park

The valley and adjacent mountains have been valuable for hunting, animal trapping, and fishing for centuries. Snares are sometimes still set to catch ptarmigan and willow grouse in the traditional manner. Scots pine were used for timber and to produce tar. Nearly every farm in the valley earned extra income making tar, and production continued far into the 20th century. The remains of many tar kilns can still be found. The park and surrounding areas provided spring, summer, and autumn grazing for semi-domesticated reindeer. In winter, the reindeer in this region graze in the nearby Kautokeino Municipality in Finnmark county to the south of the park; in summer, they are on the coast in the northwest.

It is adjacent to Käsivarsi Wilderness Area in Finland.
