= Helgøy Municipality =

Former municipality in Troms, Norway

Helgøy Municipality Helgøy herred
- Former municipality
- Helgø herred (historic name)
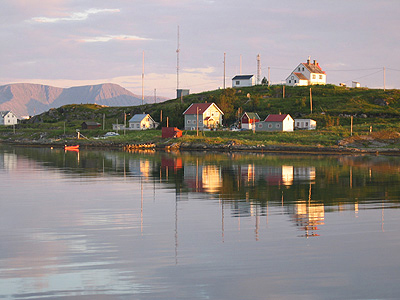
- View of Torsvåg on Vannøya, a part of Helgøy municipality

- Troms within Norway

- Helgøy within Troms
- Coordinates: 70°06′46″N 19°21′47″E
- Country: Norway
- County: Troms
- District: Hålogaland
- Established: 1 Sept 1886
  - Preceded by: Karlsøy Municipality
- Disestablished: 1 Jan 1964
  - Succeeded by: Karlsøy Municipality
- Administrative centre: Helgøya

Government
  - Mayor (1948-1963): Konrad Hansen

Area (upon dissolution)
  - Total: 659.3 km^{2} (254.6 sq mi)
  - Rank: #148 in Norway
- Highest elevation: 1,049.3 m (3,443 ft)

Population (1963)
  - Total: 1,517
  - Rank: #532 in Norway
  - Density: 2.3/km^{2} (6.0/sq mi)
  - Change (10 years): ▼ −5%
- Demonym: Helgøyværing

Official language
  - Norwegian form: Bokmål
- Time zone: UTC+01:00 (CET)
  - Summer (DST): UTC+02:00 (CEST)
- ISO 3166 code: NO-1935

Helgøy is a former municipality in Troms county, Norway. The 659-square-kilometre (254 sq mi) island municipality existed from 1886 until its dissolution in 1964. It was located in the western part of the present-day Karlsøy Municipality. The municipality included the islands of Helgøya, Grøtøya, and Nordkvaløya, large parts of the nearby islands of Rebbenesøya, Ringvassøya, Vannøya, and many smaller surrounding islands. The administrative centre was located on the south side of the island of Helgøya in a small village where Helgøy Church is also located.

Prior to its dissolution in 1964, the 659.3-square-kilometre (254.6 sq mi) municipality was the 148th largest by area out of the 689 municipalities in Norway. Helgøy Municipality was the 532nd most populous municipality in Norway with a population of about 1,517. The municipality's population density was 2.3 inhabitants per square kilometre (6.0/sq mi) and its population had decreased by 5% over the previous 10-year period.

== General information ==
From ancient times, the parish of Helgøy had existed. On 1 January 1838, municipal self-government law was introduced in Norway (see formannskapsdistrikt law), and the Helgøy parish was made a part of Karlsøy Municipality. Helgøy grew as a trading post under Christian Figenschou, but residents soon became dissatisfied with the municipal government based in Karlsøy.

On 1 September 1886 the parish of Helgøy was separated from Karlsøy Municipality to form a municipality of its own. Helgøy Municipality had an initial population of 828. Despite being separated, the two municipalities still had a common priest, sheriff, and doctor, but all these were residents in Karlsøy. From 1886 to 1892, Christian Figenschou was the mayor of Helgøy. After 1886, residents began developing a local town center on Helgøya island, with Helgøy Church, a rectory, a farm, and flourishing trade. A small village grew up around the church site and a permanent school in the parish was added on Helgøya island. Steam ships regularly stopped here and a post office was established. After 1928, a doctor and sheriff were permanently located here.

During the 1960s, there were many municipal mergers across Norway due to the work of the Schei Committee. On 1 January 1964, Helgøy Municipality was merged with the island portions of Karlsøy Municipality to form a new, larger Karlsøy Municipality. (The mainland areas of the old Karlsøy Municipality became part of Lyngen Municipality). Prior to the merger, Helgøy had a population of 1,495.

=== Name ===
The municipality is named after the island of Helgøya (Old Norse: Helgøy) since the first Helgøy Church was built there. The first element is helgi which means "sanctuary" or " holy". The last element is øy which means "island". Thus the name means den hellige øy or "the holy island". Historically, the name of the municipality was spelled Helgø. On 6 January 1908, a royal resolution changed the spelling of the name of the municipality to Helgøy.

=== Churches ===
The Church of Norway had one parish (sokn) within Helgøy Municipality. It was part of the Karlsøy prestegjeld and the Nord-Troms prosti (deanery) in the Diocese of Nord-Hålogaland.

Churches in Helgøy Municipality
Parish (sokn)	Church name	Location of the church	Year built
Helgøy	Helgøy Church	Helgøya	1742

== Geography ==
The highest point in the municipality was the 1,049.3-metre (3,443 ft) tall mountain Soltindan, which was located on the municipal border between Helgøy Municipality and Karlsøy Municipality.

== Government ==
While it existed, Helgøy Municipality was responsible for primary education (through 10th grade), outpatient health services, senior citizen services, welfare and other social services, zoning, economic development, and municipal roads and utilities. The municipality was governed by a municipal council of directly elected representatives. The mayor was indirectly elected by a vote of the municipal council. The municipality was under the jurisdiction of the Hålogaland Court of Appeal.

=== Municipal council ===
The municipal council (Kommunestyre) of Helgøy Municipality was made up of 15 representatives that were elected to four year terms. The tables below show the historical composition of the council by political party.

Helgøy herredsstyre 1959–1963
Party name (in Norwegian)	Number of representatives
Labour Party (Arbeiderpartiet)	10
Joint List(s) of Non-Socialist Parties (Borgerlige Felleslister)	5
Total number of members:	15
Note: On 1 January 1964, Helgøy Municipality became part of Karlsøy Municipality.

Helgøy herredsstyre 1955–1959
Party name (in Norwegian)	Number of representatives
Labour Party (Arbeiderpartiet)	10
Joint List(s) of Non-Socialist Parties (Borgerlige Felleslister)	5
Total number of members:	15

Helgøy herredsstyre 1951–1955
Party name (in Norwegian)	Number of representatives
Labour Party (Arbeiderpartiet)	5
List of workers, fishermen, and small farmholders (Arbeidere, fiskere, småbrukere liste)	2
Local List(s) (Lokale lister)	5
Total number of members:	12

Helgøy herredsstyre 1947–1951
Party name (in Norwegian)	Number of representatives
Labour Party (Arbeiderpartiet)	6
List of workers, fishermen, and small farmholders (Arbeidere, fiskere, småbrukere liste)	2
Joint List(s) of Non-Socialist Parties (Borgerlige Felleslister)	2
Local List(s) (Lokale lister)	2
Total number of members:	12

Helgøy herredsstyre 1945–1947
Party name (in Norwegian)	Number of representatives
Labour Party (Arbeiderpartiet)	7
Liberal Party (Venstre)	1
Local List(s) (Lokale lister)	4
Total number of members:	12

Helgøy herredsstyre 1937–1941*
Party name (in Norwegian)	Number of representatives
Labour Party (Arbeiderpartiet)	7
Liberal Party (Venstre)	2
Local List(s) (Lokale lister)	3
Total number of members:	12
Note: Due to the German occupation of Norway during World War II, no elections were held for new municipal councils until after the war ended in 1945.

=== Mayors ===
The mayor (Norwegian: ordfører) of Helgøy Municipality was the political leader of the municipality and the chairperson of the municipal council. The following people have held this position:

- 1886–1892: Christian Figenschou
- 1893–1895: Guttorm Guttormsen Raste
- 1896–1898: Edvard Raste
- 1899–1901: Christian Figenschau
- 1902–1903: Edvard Raste
- 1904–1907: Hans Raste
- 1907–1909: Søren Hansen
- 1910–1913: Hans Raste
- 1914–1922: Peder Nilsen
- 1923–1925: Hans Raste
- 1926–1934: Elias Olsen
- 1935–1941: Edvard Baardsen
- 1941–1941: Iwan Figenschou
- 1941–1943: Matteus Grindberg
- 1943–1943: Dmitri Figenschow
- 1943–1943: Nils G. Rasthe
- 1943–1945: John Olsen
- 1945–1947: Edvard Baardsen
- 1948–1963: Konrad Hansen

== See also ==
- List of former municipalities of Norway
