= List of islands of Norway by area =

The following is a list of islands of Norway by area.

== Islands close to the mainland of Norway ==
For an exhaustive list ordered by name, see list of islands of Norway.

Rank	Island	County	Area (km²)	Highest point	Altitude (m)
1	Hinnøya	Nordland and Troms	2,204.7	Møysalen	1,262
2	Senja	Troms	1,586.3	Breidtinden	1001
3	Langøya	Nordland	850.2	Snøkolla	763
4	Sørøya	Finnmark	811.4	Komagaksla	659
5	Kvaløya	Troms	737	Store Blåmann	1,044
6	Ringvassøya	Troms	656	Soltindan	1,049
7	Hitra	Trøndelag	571.5	Mørkdalstuva	345
8	Seiland	Finnmark	559	Seilandstuva	1,079
9	Austvågøya	Nordland	526.7	Higravstinden	1,146
10	Andøya	Nordland	489	Kvasstinden	705
11	Magerøya	Finnmark	436.6	Gråkallfjellet	417
12	Vestvågøya	Nordland	411	Himmeltindan	964
13	Kvaløya	Finnmark	329	Svartfjellet	629
14	Osterøy	Vestland	329	Høgafjellet	860
15	Arnøya	Troms	276	Arnøyhøgda	1,168
16	Stord	Vestland	241	Mehammarsåta	749
17	Vanna	Troms	232	Vanntinden	1,031
18	Stjernøya	Finnmark	231	Kjerringa	960
19	Smøla	Møre og Romsdal	218.2	Ramndalshaugen	70
20	Tysnesøy	Vestland	198	Tysnessåta	753
21	Tjeldøya	Nordland	187	Trollfjellet	1,010
22	Moskenesøya	Nordland	186	Hermannsdalstinden	1,029
23	Karmøy	Rogaland	176.8	Søra Sålafjellet	132
24	Sotra	Vestland	176	Liatårnet	341
25	Bømlo	Vestland	171	Siggjo	474
26	Hareidlandet	Møre og Romsdal	166	Blåtinden	697
27	Averøya	Møre og Romsdal	165	Mekknøken	752
28	Vega	Nordland	163	Trollvasstind	800
29	Bremangerlandet	Vestland	153	Svartevasshornet	889
29	Alsta	Nordland	153	Botnkrona	1,072
31	Frøya	Trøndelag	147	Besselvassheia	76
32	Reinøya	Troms	147	Reinskarstind	884
33	Otterøya	Trøndelag	143	Tømmervikfjellet	446
34	Ertvågsøya	Møre og Romsdal	139.7	Korsbakkfjellet	694
35	Gurskøya	Møre og Romsdal	139	Sollia (Gurskøy)	660
36	Andørja	Troms	135	Langlitinden	1,276
37	Dønna	Nordland	135	Dønnmannen	858
38	Skogerøya	Finnmark	129	Skogerøytoppen	445
39	Sula	Vestland	116.2	Krakhellenipa	569
40	Flakstadøya	Nordland	109.8	Stjerntinden	931
41	Rolla	Troms	107	Drangen	1,022
42	Grytøya	Troms	107	Nona	1,012
43	Radøy	Vestland	103	Morkenfjellet	217
44	Sandhornøya	Nordland	103	Sandhornet	993
45	Hadseløya	Nordland	102	Lamlitind	656
46	Askøy	Vestland	99	Kolbeinsvarden	231
47	Inner-Vikna	Trøndelag	99	Vattatuva	162
48	Rolvsøya	Finnmark	89	Valfjordnæringen	363
49	Tustna	Møre og Romsdal	89	Skarven	896
50	Austra	Trøndelag and Nordland	88	Romsskåla	588
51	Holsnøy	Vestland	88	Eldsfjellet	324
52	Kågen	Troms	85.7	Store Kågtinden	1,228
53	Nordkvaløya	Troms	84	Storalangen	736
54	Ytter-Vikna	Trøndelag	82	Vattafjell	173
55	Rebbenesøya	Troms	82	Geittinden	694
56	Uløya	Troms	78	Blåtinden	1,142
57	Otrøya	Møre og Romsdal	75.5	Oppstadhornet	737
58	Engeløya	Nordland	68	Trohornet	649
59	Finnøya	Nordland	68	Straumfjellet	434
60	Vågsøy	Vestland	64	Veten	630
61	Frei	Møre og Romsdal	64	Freikollen	629
62	Leka	Trøndelag	60	Vattinden	418
63	Sula	Møre og Romsdal	59	Tverrfjellet	776
64	Ombo	Rogaland	58	Bandåsen	511
65	Jøa	Trøndelag	55.3	Moldvikfjellet	297
66	Dyrøya	Troms	53	Blåtinden	562
67	Huftarøy	Vestland	50.4	Loddo	244

== Islands distant from the mainland of Norway ==
Rank	Island	Location	Population	Area (km²)	Highest point	Altitude (m)
1	Spitsbergen	Svalbard	2,642	39,044	Newtontoppen	1,713
2	Nordaustlandet	Svalbard	0	14,443	Norddomen	700
3	Edgeøya	Svalbard	0	5,073	Caltexfjellet	590
4	Barentsøya	Svalbard	0	1,288	Schweinfurthfjellet	590
5	Kvitøya	Svalbard	0	682		270
6	Prince Charles Foreland (Prins Karls Forland)	Svalbard	0	615	Monacofjellet	1,084
7	Jan Mayen	Greenland Sea	18	373	Beerenberg	2,277
8	Kongsøya	Svalbard	0	191		320
9	Bjørnøya	Svalbard	9	178	Miseryfjellet	536
10	Peter I Island	Bellingshausen Sea, Antarctica	0	156	Lars Christensen Peak	1,640
11	Svenskøya	Svalbard	0	137		230
12	Wilhelm Island	Svalbard	0	120		656
13	Lågøya	Svalbard	0	103.5		
14	Bouvet Island	South Atlantic Ocean	0	58	Olavtoppen	780

== See also ==
- List of islands of Norway (islands of Norway, sorted by name)
- List of European islands by area
- List of islands by area
- List of islands by highest point
