= Karlsøya =

Karlsøya or Karlsøy (Norwegian: Karl's island) may refer to:

== Places ==
=== Norway ===
- Karlsøy Municipality, a municipality in Troms county
- Karlsøy Church, a church in Karlsøy Municipality in Troms county
- Karlsøy, Nordland, a village in Hamarøy municipality in Nordland county
- Karlsøya (Møre og Romsdal), an island in Molde municipality, Møre og Romsdal county
- Karlsøya (Nærøysund), an island in Nærøysund municipality, Trøndelag county
- Karlsøya (Nordland), an island in Bodø municipality, Nordland county
- Karlsøya (Ørland), an island in Ørland municipality, Trøndelag county
- Karlsøya (Troms), an island in Karlsøy municipality, Troms county
- Karlsøya (Østfold), an island in Sarpsborg municipality, Østfold county
