= Helgøya =

Helgøy or Helgøya may refer to:

== People ==
- Håkon Helgøy (born 1947), a Norwegian politician for the Christian Democratic Party

== Places ==
- Helgøy Municipality, a former municipality in Troms county, Norway
- Helgøy Church, a church in Karlsøy Municipality in Troms county, Norway
- Helgøya, Innlandet, a large island in Ringsaker Municipality in Innlandet county, Norway
- Helgøya Church, a church in Ringsaker Municipality, Innlandet county, Norway
- Helgøy (Rogaland), an island in Stavanger Municipality, Rogaland county, Norway
- Helgøya (Vestland), an island in Kinn Municipality, Vestland county, Norway
- Helgøya (Troms), an island in Karlsøy Municipality, Troms county, Norway
- Helgøya (Agder), an island in Kristiansand Municipality in Agder county, Norway
