= Karlsøy Church =

- Karlsøy kirke
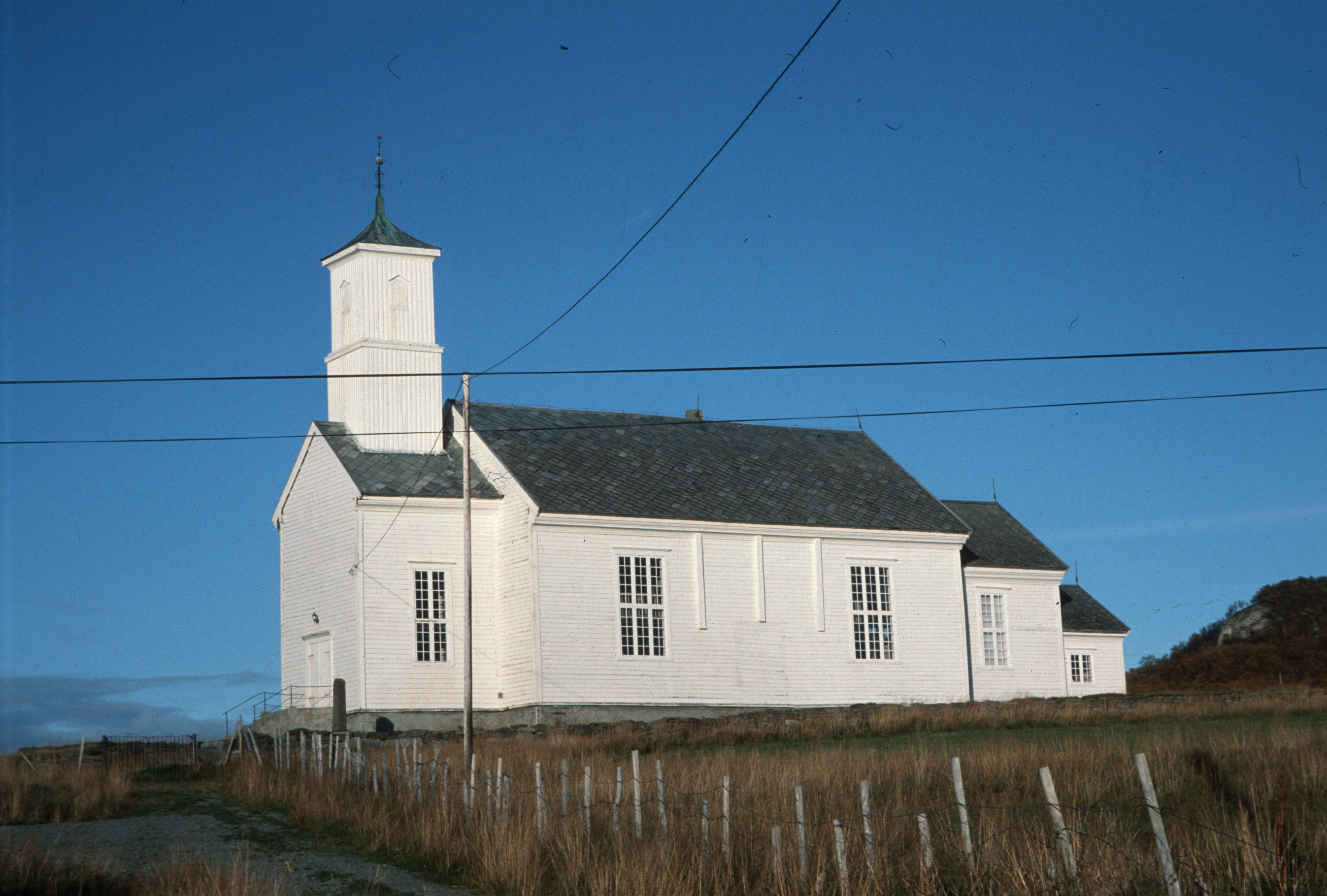
- View of the church
- Karlsøy Church
- 70.002236°N 19.894845°E
- Location: Karlsøy Municipality, Troms
- Country: Norway
- Denomination: Church of Norway
- Churchmanship: Evangelical Lutheran

History
- Status: Parish church
- Founded: 13th century
- Consecrated: 1854

Architecture
- Functional status: Inactive
- Architect: Hans Linstow
- Architectural type: Long church
- Completed: 1854 (172 years ago)
- Closed: 4 July 1978

Specifications
- Capacity: 570
- Materials: Wood

Administration
- Diocese: Nord-Hålogaland
- Deanery: Tromsø domprosti
- Parish: Karlsøy
- Norwegian Cultural Heritage Site
- Type: Church
- Status: Listed
- ID: 84763

Karlsøy Church (Norwegian: Karlsøy kirke) is a historic parish church of the Church of Norway in Karlsøy Municipality in Troms county, Norway. It is located on the island of Karlsøya. It is the former main church for the Karlsøy parish which is part of the Tromsø domprosti (arch-deanery) in the Diocese of Nord-Hålogaland. The church is no longer in regular use, since it is on a remote island that is now sparsely populated. The church holds special services occasionally, including one summer service each year. The white, wooden church was built in a long church style using plans drawn up by the architect Hans Linstow. The church seats about 570 people.

== History ==
The earliest existing historical records of the church on Karlsøya date back to the year 1419, but the church was likely built in the late 13th century. A new long church was built in 1620. In 1732 the church was repaired and in 1770 an addition was built to make room for more people. In 1790, the church was converted to a cruciform design by adding two side wings.

In 1814, this church served as an election church (Norwegian: valgkirke). Together with more than 300 other parish churches across Norway, it was a polling station for elections to the 1814 Norwegian Constituent Assembly which wrote the Constitution of Norway. This was Norway's first national elections. Each church parish was a constituency that elected people called "electors" who later met together in each county to elect the representatives for the assembly that was to meet at Eidsvoll Manor later that year.

Over time, the church needed repairs. In 1824, part of the church floor was replaced. In 1834, more of the floor and some windows were replaced. By the mid-1800s, however, the church required replacement. In 1854, it was torn down and the present church was built. The church was consecrated on 20 October 1854. The new church had a long church design, but it was much larger than the previous building. In 1906, an organ was installed in the building.

Over time, particularly in the late-20th century, the island of Karlsøya began to depopulate. The island had been the civil and religious centre of Karlsøy for centuries, but more people were moving to other parts of the municipality that were connected to the road network and Karlsøya became more isolated. By the 1960s, the administrative centre was moved to Hansnes on the large island of Ringvassøya, and at the same time, planning for a new church in Hansnes began. Ringvassøy Church was completed in 1977 and on 4 July 1978, Karlsøy Church held its last regularly scheduled worship service. The church is still occasionally used, but only for special occasions.

== See also ==
- List of churches in Nord-Hålogaland
