= Torsvåg =

Village in Karlsøy Municipality, Norway

- Village
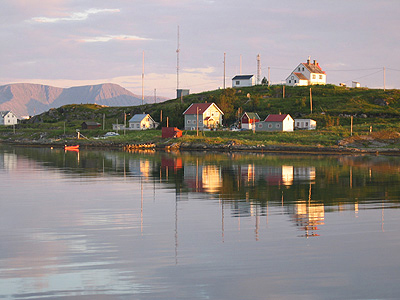
- The Torsvåg lighthouse sits at the top of Kåja. The largest house is the Figenschow building, and the house on the far left is the Solberg building. Behind Kåja we can see Nordkvaløya.
- Interactive map of Torsvåg
- Location within Troms Location within Norway
- Coordinates: 70°14′35″N 19°29′47″E
- Country: Norway
- Region: Northern Norway
- County: Troms
- District: Hålogaland
- Municipality: Karlsøy Municipality
- Elevation: 3 m (9.8 ft)
- Time zone: UTC+01:00 (CET)
  - Summer (DST): UTC+02:00 (CEST)
- Post Code: 9136 Vannareid

Torsvåg is a fishing village on the far northwestern coast of Vannøya island in Karlsøy Municipality in Troms county, Norway. The nearest city is Tromsø about 90 kilometres (56 mi) southwest of Torsvåg. There is much archeological evidence that show that there has been settlements in Torsvåg since the Stone Age.

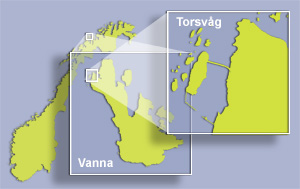
Torsvåg is on Vanna, an island in Troms, Norway.

The village of Torsvåg includes a village area on the island of Vannøya and also an area on the islet of Kåja, located just offshore. There is a causeway connecting the two places which forms a nice harbor surrounded by the fishing village. The breakwaters at the entrance to the harbor form a snug port at the threshold of the big seas. The Vanna fish processing plant, «Torsvågbruket», is located on Kåja island and Torsvåg Lighthouse is on the highest point of the island. Today, Torsvåg only has between 10 and 20 inhabitants, but earlier in its history this fishing village often had hundreds of residents.

== History ==
A fishing village chapel has stood on Kirkesand, probably from the 15th century to the late 17th century. The priest for the Helgøy Church parish lived here for a period, and the archbishop in Trondheim also had his man in Torsvåg to manage his interests.

From the Middle Ages until the end of the 17th century, fishing flourished in Torsvåg, there were generally good economic times for both permanent residents and visiting seasonal fishermen. The most long-distance travelers must have come all the way from Salten. People also came from other countries and settled in Torsvåg. The fishing trade grew and Torsvåg was both a fishing village, a rowing village and a trading post. There was good trade and frequent yachting both to Trondheim and the cosmopolitan city of Bergen.

== Climate ==
Torsvåg has a cool (subpolar/Cfc) oceanic climate, with small annual temperature range between summer and winter. The wettest season in autumn and winter, the driest season is spring and summer.

Climate data for Torsvåg Lighthouse 1991-2020 (21 m, extremes 1939-2024)
Month	Jan	Feb	Mar	Apr	May	Jun	Jul	Aug	Sep	Oct	Nov	Dec	Year
Record high °C (°F)	9.6 (49.3)	9.2 (48.6)	10 (50)	15.8 (60.4)	22.4 (72.3)	26.1 (79.0)	27.2 (81.0)	25.5 (77.9)	22.9 (73.2)	19 (66)	13.8 (56.8)	12.5 (54.5)	27.2 (81.0)
Mean daily maximum °C (°F)	1.8 (35.2)	1.4 (34.5)	2 (36)	4.3 (39.7)	7.9 (46.2)	11 (52)	14.1 (57.4)	13.6 (56.5)	11 (52)	6.8 (44.2)	4.4 (39.9)	2.9 (37.2)	6.8 (44.2)
Daily mean °C (°F)	0 (32)	−0.4 (31.3)	0.1 (32.2)	2.2 (36.0)	5.5 (41.9)	8.5 (47.3)	11.3 (52.3)	11.2 (52.2)	8.9 (48.0)	5.2 (41.4)	2.8 (37.0)	1.2 (34.2)	4.7 (40.5)
Mean daily minimum °C (°F)	−1.6 (29.1)	−2.1 (28.2)	−1.5 (29.3)	0.5 (32.9)	3.6 (38.5)	6.5 (43.7)	9.2 (48.6)	9.4 (48.9)	7.3 (45.1)	3.6 (38.5)	1.3 (34.3)	−0.4 (31.3)	3.0 (37.4)
Record low °C (°F)	−15.1 (4.8)	−14 (7)	−12.3 (9.9)	−9.1 (15.6)	−4.6 (23.7)	−2 (28)	2.8 (37.0)	3 (37)	−1.6 (29.1)	−5.4 (22.3)	−9.6 (14.7)	−11.9 (10.6)	−15.1 (4.8)
Average precipitation mm (inches)	87 (3.4)	73 (2.9)	75 (3.0)	53 (2.1)	47 (1.9)	41 (1.6)	49 (1.9)	69 (2.7)	81 (3.2)	106 (4.2)	85 (3.3)	90 (3.5)	856 (33.7)
Source 1: Norwegian Meteorological Institute
Source 2: NOAA - WMO averages 91-2020 Norway
