= Blix =

Blix is an old noble lineage from Norway and surname. Notable people with the surname include:

- Arne Blix (born 1954), Norwegian journalist
- Arnoldus Schytte Blix (born 1946), Norwegian zoologist and Arctic explorer
- Brynjulf Blix (born 1951), Norwegian pianist
- Elias Blix (1836–1902), Norwegian poet, musician, and politician
- Gunnar Blix (1894–1981), Swedish chemist
- Gustav Blix (born 1974), Swedish politician
- Hans Blix (born 1928), Swedish diplomat and politician
- Lewis Blix (1862–1934), Norwegian-American yacht racer
- Magnus Gustaf Blix (1849–1904), Swedish physiologist
- Michael Blix (1786–1870), Norwegian politician
- Øystein B. Blix (born 1966), Norwegian jazz trombonist
- Peter Andreas Blix (1831–1901), Norwegian architect and engineer
- Ragnvald Blix (1882–1958), Norwegian illustrator and magazine editor
- Sverre Blix (1885–1967), Norwegian footballer

Blix is also a chemical used in photographic processing - the name is a contraction of bleach and fixer.

== Other ==
- Blix Donnelly (1914–1976), American baseball player
- Blix Street Records, United States-based record label
