= Hansnes =

Village in Karlsøy Municipality, Norway

- Village
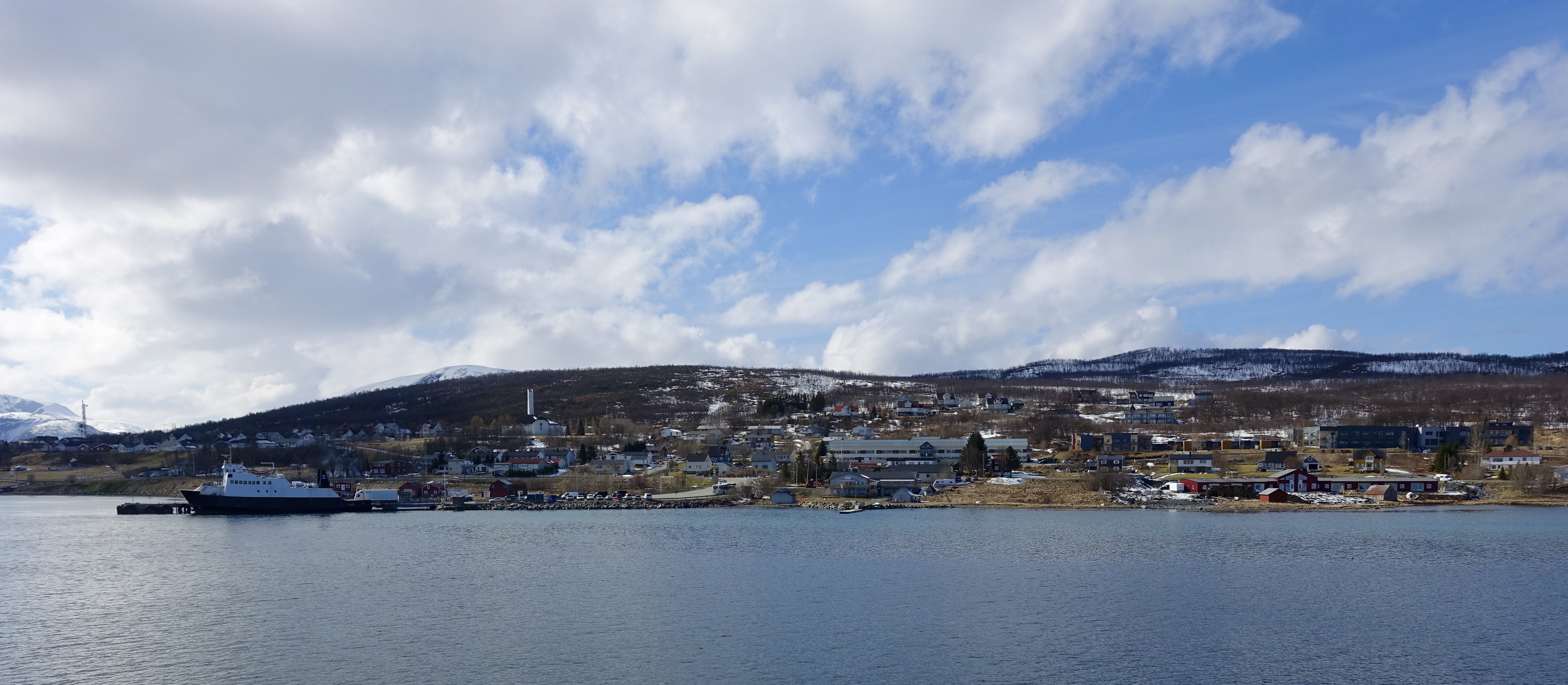
- View of the village
- Interactive map of Hansnes
- Location within Troms Location within Norway
- Coordinates: 69.9670°N 19.6275°E
- Country: Norway
- Region: Northern Norway
- County: Troms
- District: Hålogaland
- Municipality: Karlsøy Municipality

Area
  - Total: 0.51 km^{2} (0.20 sq mi)
- Elevation: 6 m (20 ft)

Population (2023)
  - Total: 472
  - Density: 925/km^{2} (2,400/sq mi)
- Time zone: UTC+01:00 (CET)
  - Summer (DST): UTC+02:00 (CEST)
- Post Code: 9130 Hansnes

Hansnes is the administrative centre of Karlsøy Municipality in Troms county, Norway. The village is located on the northeast side of the island of Ringvassøya, along the Langsundet strait. By car, it is about 58 kilometres (36 mi) northeast of the city of Tromsø. The Langsund Tunnel is a proposed undersea tunnel which will connect the islands of Ringvassøya and Reinøya. When built, the tunnel will replace the ferry service from Hansnes to the nearby islands of Karlsøya, Vannøya, and Reinøya.

The 0.51-square-kilometre (130-acre) village has a population (2023) of 472 and a population density of 925 inhabitants per square kilometre (2,400/sq mi). Hansnes is home to stores, a gas station, a bank, a café, a medical center, Ringvassøy Church, a school, a day care, and nursing homes.

It is possible that the village was given its name when Hans Mortensen Hegeland when he moved the family farm from Elvevoll approximately 1672.
