= Helgøya (Troms) =

Island in Karlsøy, Norway

Helgøya (Norwegian); Áilu (Northern Sami)
- Interactive map of: Helgøya (Norwegian); Áilu (Northern Sami)

Geography
- Location: Troms, Norway
- Coordinates: 70.1287°N 19.4260°E
- Area: 42.92 km^{2} (16.57 sq mi)
- Length: 10 km (6 mi)
- Width: 5.5 km (3.42 mi)
- Highest elevation: 486 m (1594 ft)
- Highest point: Storheia

Administration
- Norway
- County: Troms
- Municipality: Karlsøy Municipality

Demographics
- Population: 0 (1999)
- Pop. density: 0/km^{2} (0/sq mi)

Helgøya (Norwegian) or Áilu (Northern Sami) is an island (and former fishing village) in Karlsøy Municipality in Troms county, Norway. The 42.92-square-kilometre (16.57 sq mi) island is surrounded by a number of islands: Vannøya to the northeast; Karlsøya and Reinøya to the southeast; Ringvassøya to the south; and Nordkvaløya to the west.

Historically, the island was an active hub for Helgøy Municipality and the Church of Norway parish of Helgøy. It was a large fishing village and the home of the historic Helgøy Church. The church has been located on Helgøya since the 13th century, but has not been regularly used for some time. No one has permanently lived on Helgøya since 1999 when the post office was closed and regular ferry service was ended. The island can only be reached when services are celebrated in the church and ferry rides are organized. The island of Helgøya is now more or less an abandoned village of picturesque wooden houses with a historic church that is used on special occasions. Some of the houses are still used as summer vacation homes.

== Name ==
The island is named Helgøya (Old Norse: Helgøy) since it is the location of the main church for the parish, Helgøy Church. The first element is helgi which means "sanctuary" or " holy". The last element is øy which means "island". Thus the name means den hellige øy or "the holy island".

== See also ==
- List of islands of Norway
