= Kvaløya =

Kvaløya is the name of many islands in Norway:

== Large islands ==
- Kvaløya (Tromsø), in Tromsø Municipality in Troms county
  - Kvaløya SK, the local sports club in Tromsø
- Kvaløya, Brønnøy, in Brønnøy Municipality in Nordland county
- Kvaløya, Finnmark, in Hammerfest Municipality in Finnmark county
- Kvaløya, Flatanger, in Flatanger Municipality in Trøndelag county
- Kvaløya, Frøya, in Frøya Municipality in Trøndelag county
- Kvaløya, Herøy, in Herøy Municipality in Nordland county
- Kvaløya, Leka, in Leka Municipality in Trøndelag county
- Kvaløya, Nærøysund, in Nærøysund Municipality in Trøndelag county
- Kvaløya, Sømna, in Sømna Municipality in Nordland county
- Nordkvaløya, in Karlsøy Nunicipality in Troms county

== Small islands ==
These small islands are mostly uninhabited:

- Kvaløya, Bømlo, in Bømlo Municipality in Vestland county
- Kvaløya, Grimstad, in Grimstad Municipality in Agder county
- Kvaløya, Harstad, in Harstad Municipality in Troms county
- Kvaløya, Karmøy, in Karmøy Municipality in Rogaland county
- Kvaløya, Kinn, in Kinn Municipality in Vestland county
- Kvaløya, Lødingen, in Lødingen Municipality in Nordland county
- Kvaløya, Meløy, in Meløy Municipality in Nordland county
- Kvaløya, Molde, in Molde Municipality in Møre og Romsdal county
- Kvaløya, Senja, in Senja Municipality in Troms county
- Kvaløya, Smøla, in Smøla Municipality in Møre og Romsdal county
- Kvaløya, Steigen, in Steigen Municipality in Nordland county
- Kvaløya, Træna, in Træna Municipality in Nordland county
- Kvaløya, Ålesund, in Ålesund Municipality in Møre og Romsdal county
- Kvaløya, Ørland, in Ørland Municipality in Trøndelag county
- Kvaløyi, Austevoll, in Austevoll Municipality in Vestland county
- Kvaløyna, Askvoll, in Askvoll Municipality in Vestland county
- Kvaløyna, Hjelmeland, in Hjelmeland Municipality in Rogaland county
- Kvaløyna, Solund, in Solund Municipality in Vestland county
- Kvaløyna, Øygarden, in Øygarden Municipality in Vestland county
- Store Kvaløya, Hitra, in Hitra Municipality in Trøndelag county
