= Ringvassøy Church =

- Ringvassøy kirke
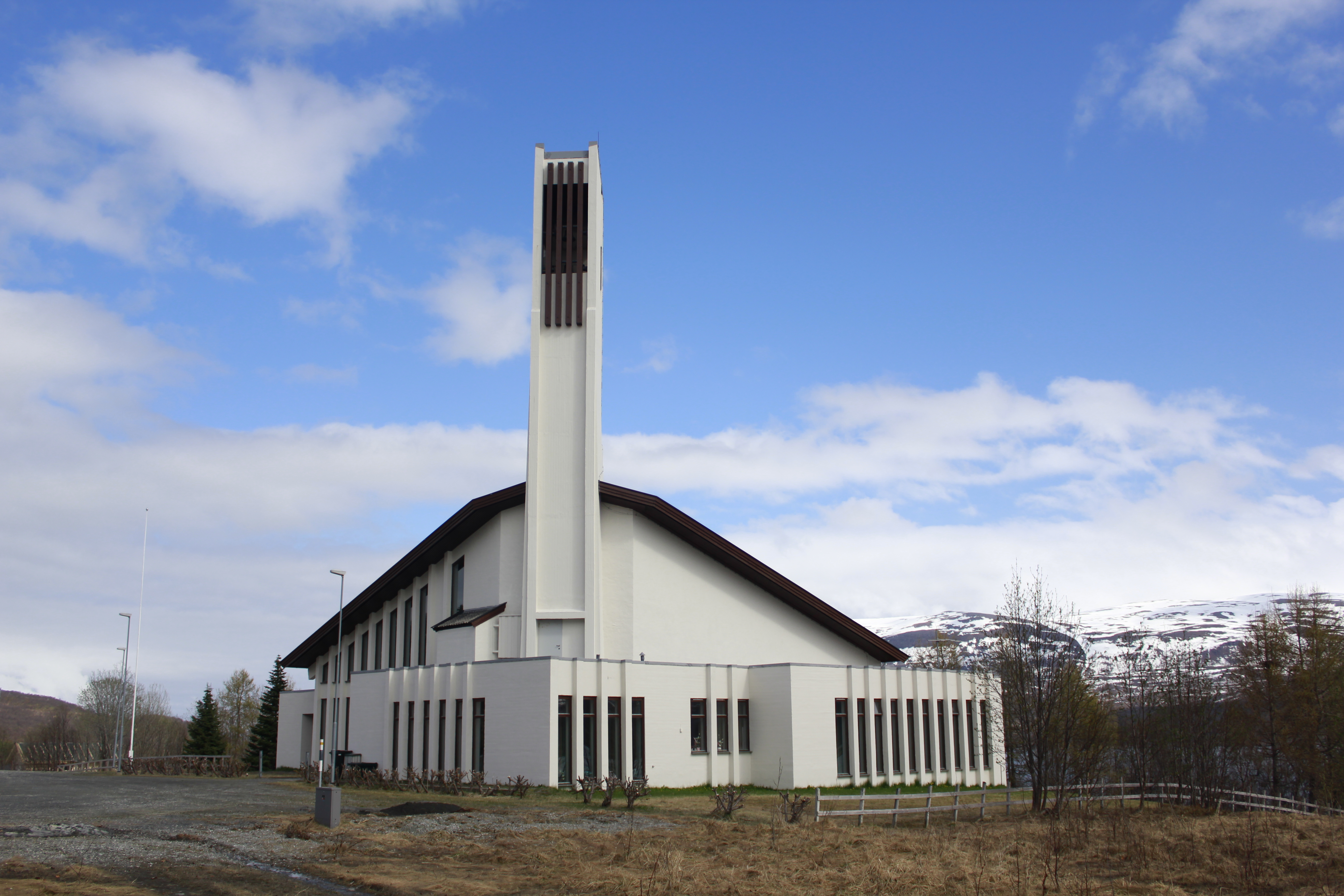
- View of the church
- Ringvassøy Church
- 69.966256°N 19.6215455°E
- Location: Karlsøy Municipality, Troms
- Country: Norway
- Denomination: Church of Norway
- Churchmanship: Evangelical Lutheran

History
- Status: Parish church
- Founded: 1977
- Consecrated: 1977

Architecture
- Functional status: Active
- Architect: Nils J. Toft
- Architectural type: Fan-shaped
- Completed: 1977 (49 years ago)

Specifications
- Capacity: 400
- Materials: Concrete

Administration
- Diocese: Nord-Hålogaland
- Deanery: Tromsø domprosti
- Parish: Karlsøy
- Norwegian Cultural Heritage Site
- Type: Church
- Status: Not protected
- ID: 85299

Ringvassøy Church (Norwegian: Ringvassøy kirke) is a parish church of the Church of Norway in Karlsøy Municipality in Troms county, Norway. It is located in the village of Hansnes on the island of Ringvassøya. It is the main church for the Karlsøy parish which is part of the Tromsø domprosti (arch-deanery) in the Diocese of Nord-Hålogaland.

== History ==
In 1970, when the administrative centre of Karlsøy Municipality was moved from the small island of Karlsøya to the village of Hansnes (on Ringvassøya island), the discussion began about building a church in Hansnes to be the new main church for the municipality. The white, concrete church building was completed in 1977 and it seats about 400 people. The church has a fan-shaped design. The church was consecrated on 12 June 1977 by the Bishop Kristen Kyrre Bremer.

== Media gallery ==
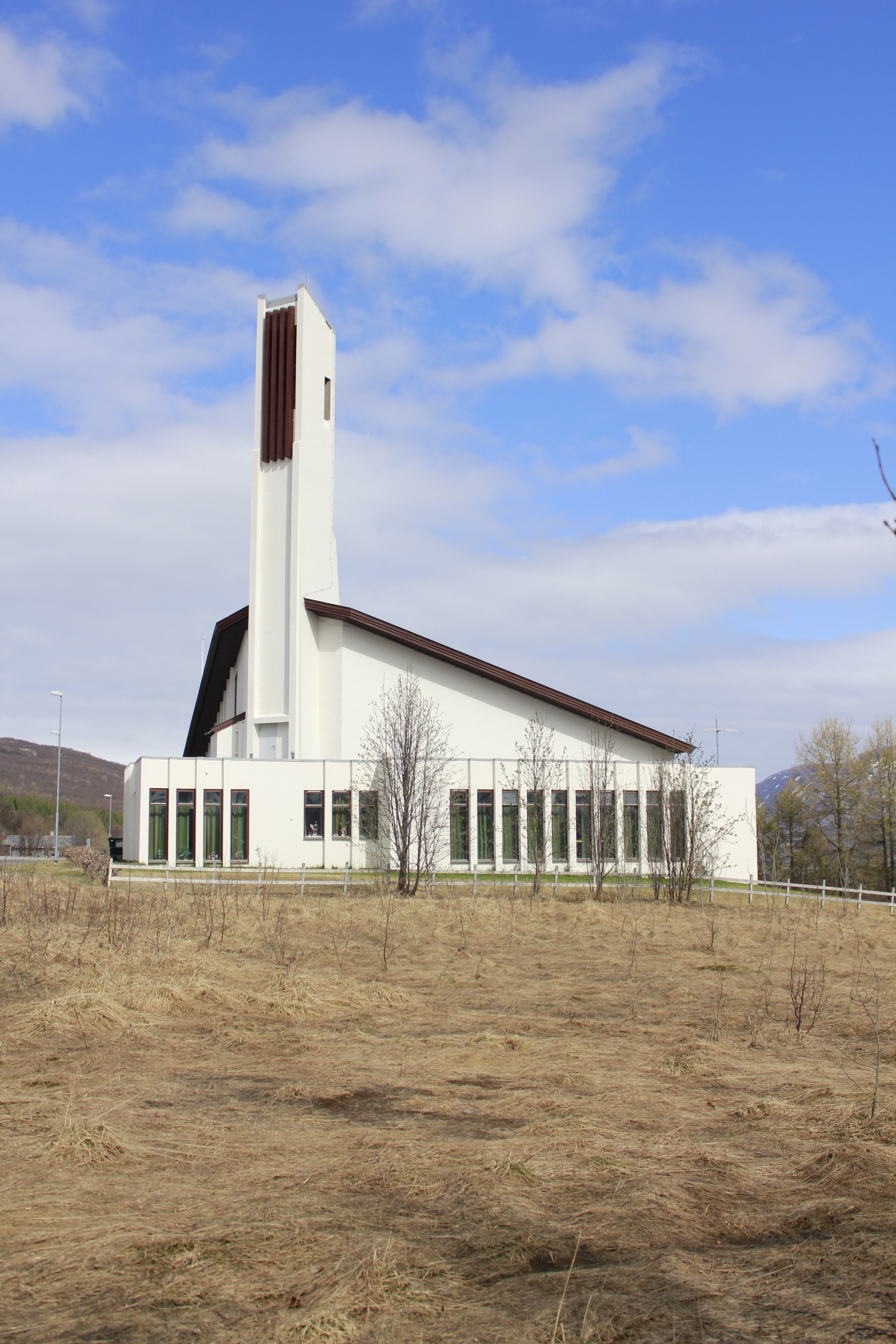

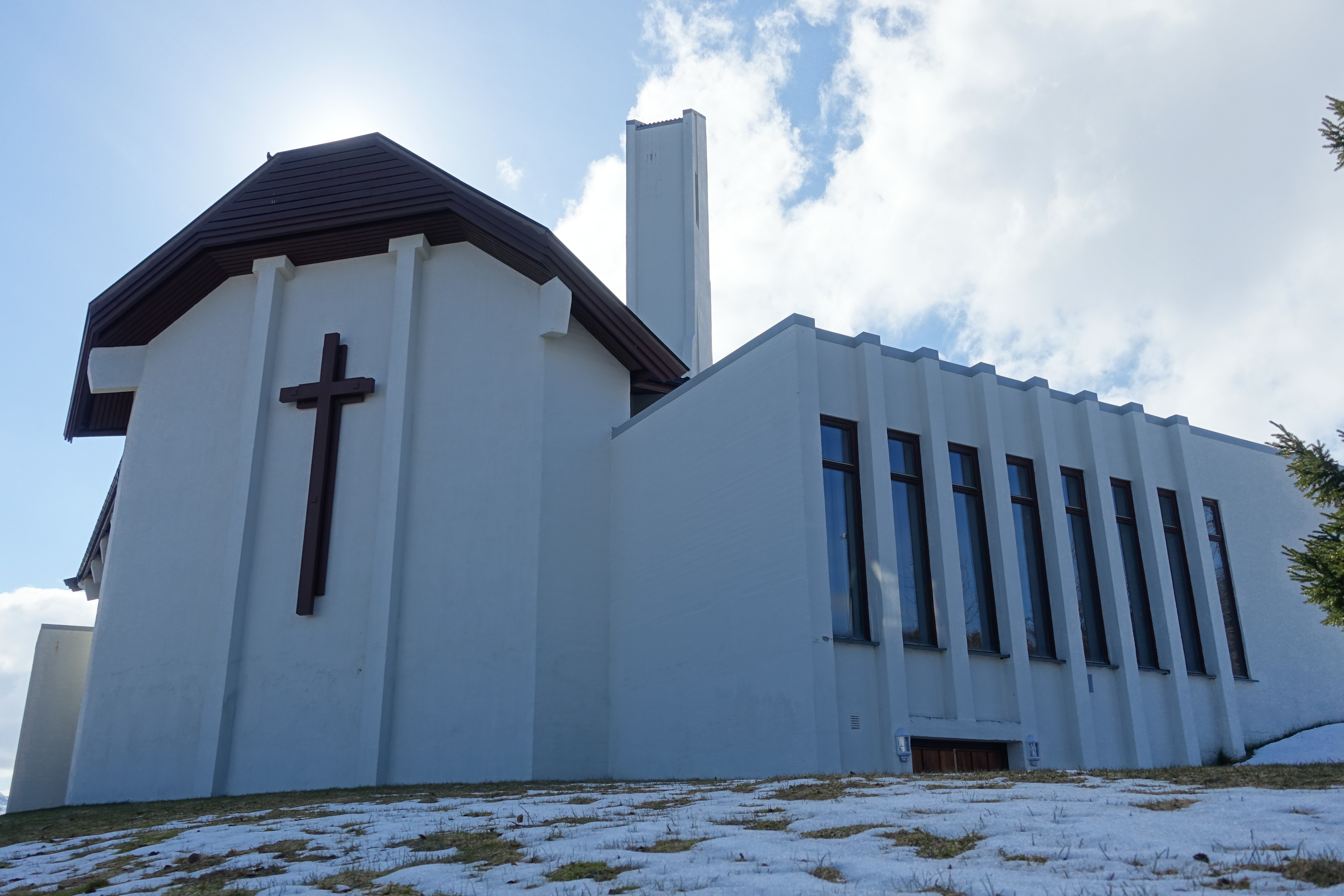

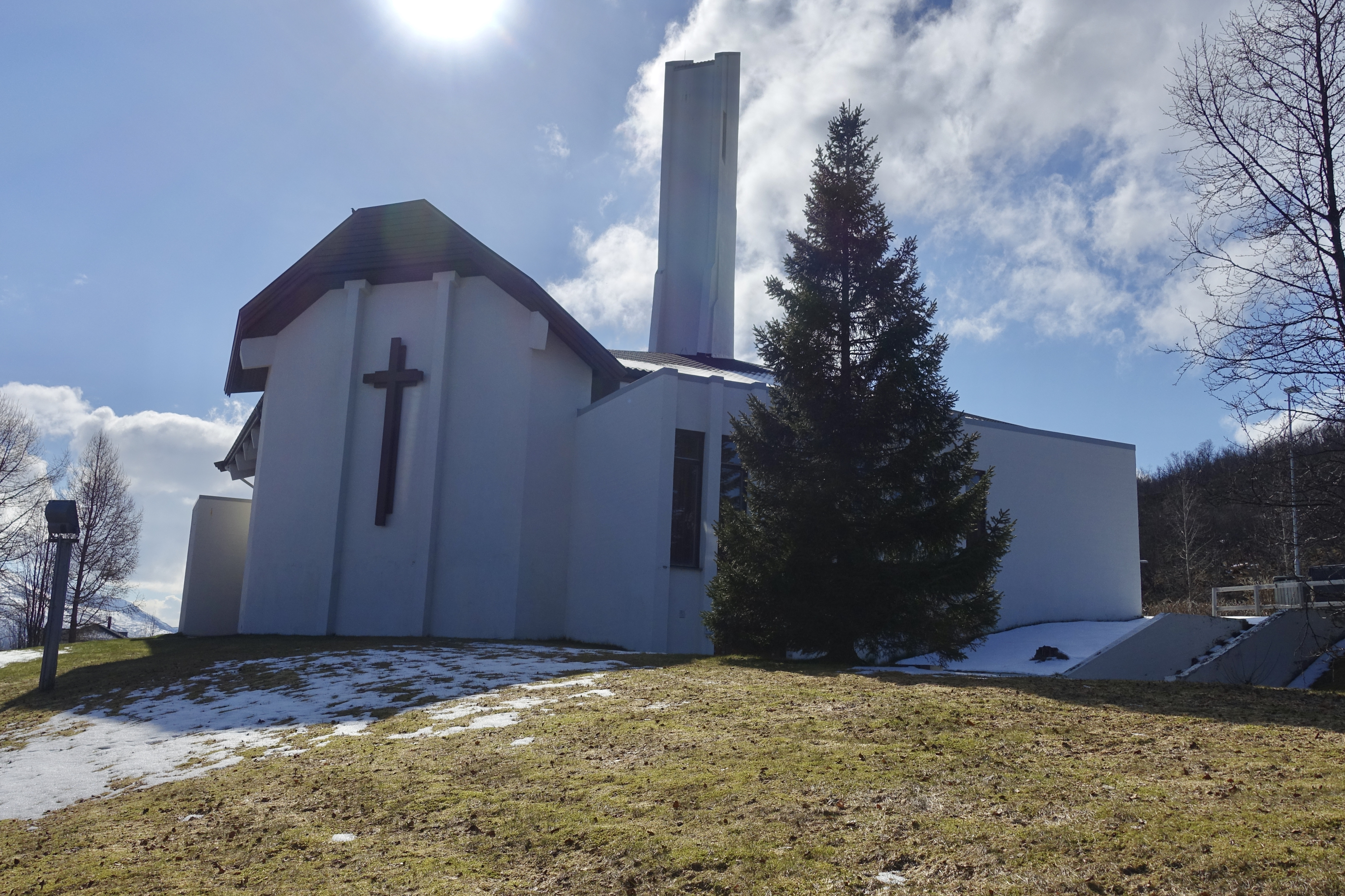

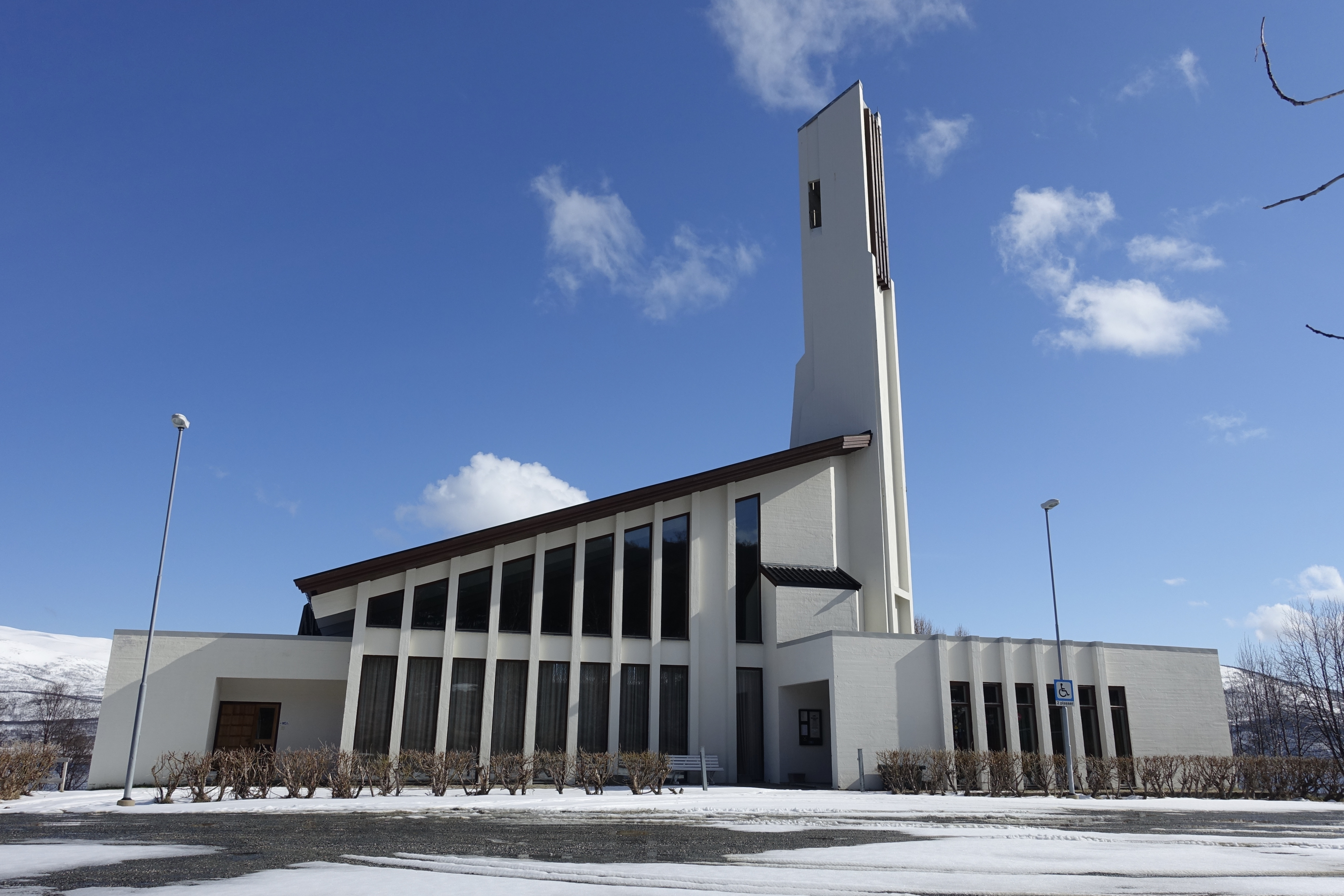

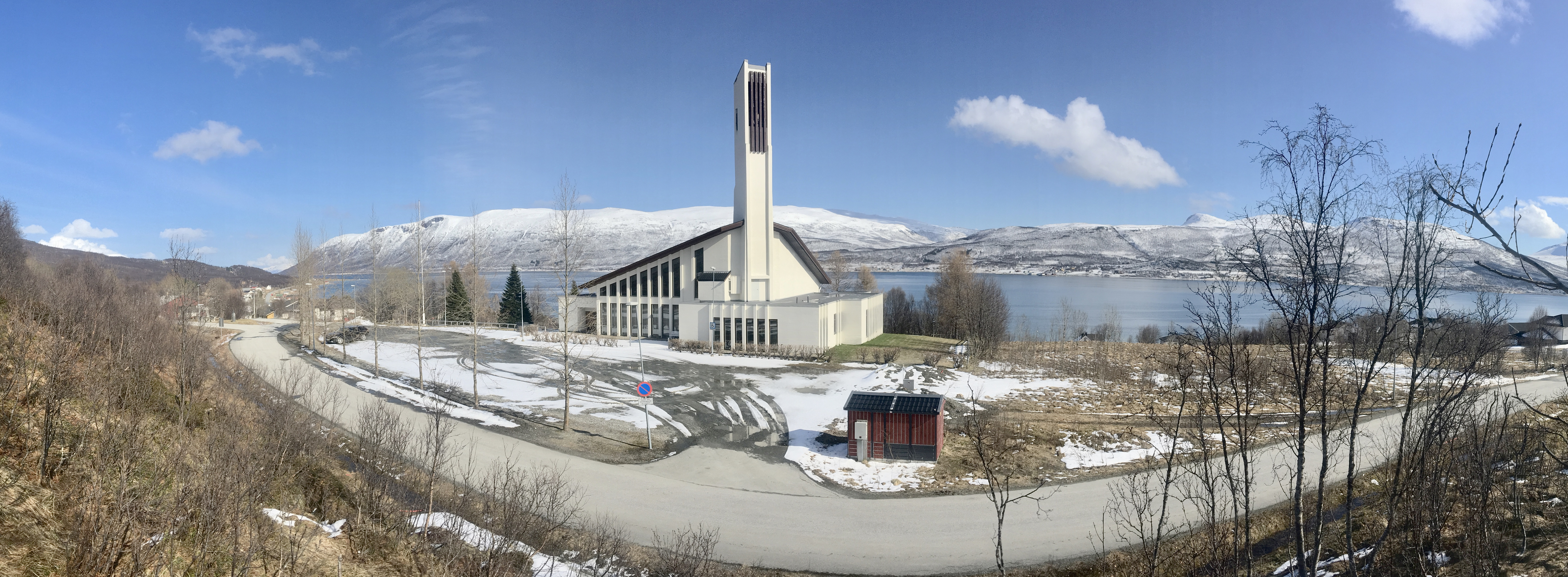

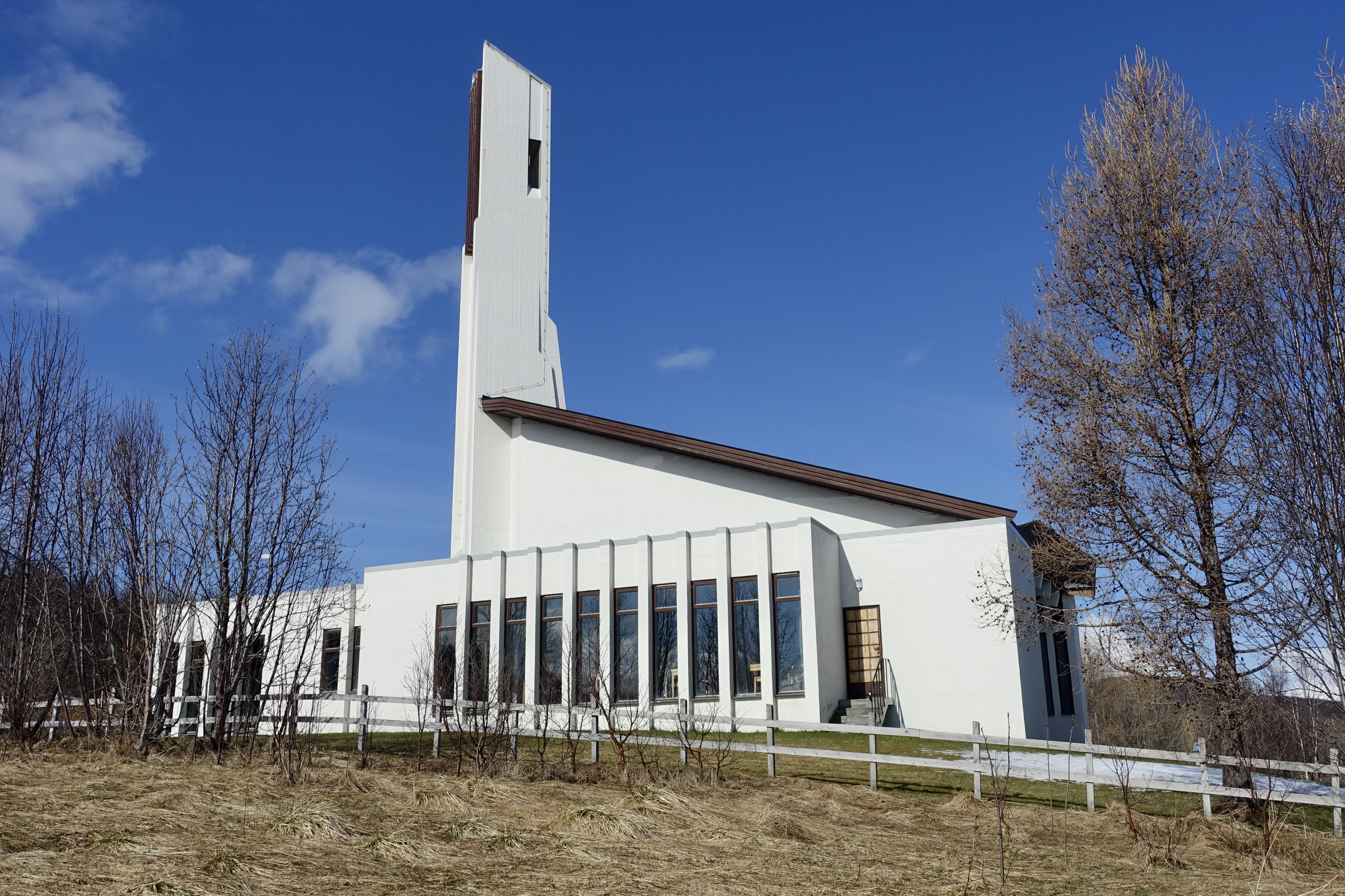

== See also ==
- List of churches in Nord-Hålogaland
