= Torsvåg Lighthouse =

Coastal lighthouse in Karlsøy, Norway

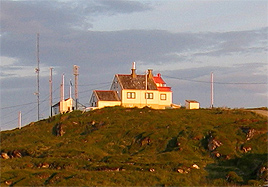
- View of the lighthouse
- Location of the lighthouse
- Location: Karlsøy Municipality, Troms, Norway
- Coordinates: 70°14′43″N 19°30′00″E

Tower
- Constructed: 1916
- Construction: wooden tower
- Automated: 1986
- Height: 9.6 metres (31 ft)
- Shape: square tower with balcony and lantern attached to the keeper's house
- Markings: white tower, red lantern

Light
- Focal height: 32.5 metres (107 ft)
- Intensity: 35,600 candela
- Range: 16.5 nmi (30.6 km; 19.0 mi)
- Characteristic: Oc WRG 6s.

Torsvåg Lighthouse (Norwegian: Torsvåg fyr) is a coastal lighthouse located in Karlsøy Municipality in Troms county, Norway. The lighthouse is in the village of Torsvåg on a small island connected to the main island of Vannøya by a short causeway.

== History ==
The lighthouse was first lit in 1916, automated in 1986, and has not had an on-site lighthouse keeper since 2006.

The light on top of the 9.6-metre (31 ft) tall tower flashes a white, red, or green light depending on direction, occulting once every six seconds. The light intensity is 35,600 candela and the light can be seen for up to 16.5 nmi (30.6 km; 19.0 mi).

== Climate ==
Climate data for Torsvåg Lighthouse 1991-2020 (21 m, extremes 1939-2025)
Month	Jan	Feb	Mar	Apr	May	Jun	Jul	Aug	Sep	Oct	Nov	Dec	Year
Record high °C (°F)	9.6 (49.3)	10 (50)	10 (50)	15.8 (60.4)	22.4 (72.3)	26.1 (79.0)	27.2 (81.0)	26.5 (79.7)	22.9 (73.2)	19 (66)	13.8 (56.8)	12.5 (54.5)	27.2 (81.0)
Mean daily maximum °C (°F)	1.8 (35.2)	1.4 (34.5)	2 (36)	4.3 (39.7)	7.9 (46.2)	11 (52)	14.1 (57.4)	13.6 (56.5)	11 (52)	6.8 (44.2)	4.4 (39.9)	2.9 (37.2)	6.8 (44.2)
Daily mean °C (°F)	0 (32)	−0.4 (31.3)	0.1 (32.2)	2.2 (36.0)	5.5 (41.9)	8.5 (47.3)	11.3 (52.3)	11.2 (52.2)	8.9 (48.0)	5.2 (41.4)	2.8 (37.0)	1.2 (34.2)	4.7 (40.5)
Mean daily minimum °C (°F)	−1.6 (29.1)	−2.1 (28.2)	−1.5 (29.3)	0.5 (32.9)	3.6 (38.5)	6.5 (43.7)	9.2 (48.6)	9.4 (48.9)	7.3 (45.1)	3.6 (38.5)	1.3 (34.3)	−0.4 (31.3)	3.0 (37.4)
Record low °C (°F)	−15.1 (4.8)	−14 (7)	−12.3 (9.9)	−9.1 (15.6)	−4.6 (23.7)	−2 (28)	2.8 (37.0)	3 (37)	−1.6 (29.1)	−5.4 (22.3)	−9.6 (14.7)	−11.9 (10.6)	−15.1 (4.8)
Average precipitation mm (inches)	87 (3.4)	73 (2.9)	75 (3.0)	53 (2.1)	47 (1.9)	41 (1.6)	49 (1.9)	69 (2.7)	81 (3.2)	106 (4.2)	85 (3.3)	90 (3.5)	856 (33.7)
Source 1: Norwegian Meteorological Institute
Source 2: NOAA - WMO averages 91-2020 Norway

Climate data for Torsvåg Lighthouse 1961-1990
Month	Jan	Feb	Mar	Apr	May	Jun	Jul	Aug	Sep	Oct	Nov	Dec	Year
Mean daily maximum °C (°F)	0.7 (33.3)	0.6 (33.1)	1.3 (34.3)	3.2 (37.8)	6.9 (44.4)	10.8 (51.4)	13.6 (56.5)	13.2 (55.8)	9.9 (49.8)	6.3 (43.3)	3.3 (37.9)	1.5 (34.7)	5.9 (42.6)
Daily mean °C (°F)	−1.1 (30.0)	−1.2 (29.8)	−0.5 (31.1)	1.4 (34.5)	4.8 (40.6)	8.0 (46.4)	10.8 (51.4)	10.7 (51.3)	7.9 (46.2)	4.6 (40.3)	1.6 (34.9)	−0.3 (31.5)	3.9 (39.0)
Mean daily minimum °C (°F)	−2.9 (26.8)	−3.0 (26.6)	−2.2 (28.0)	−0.3 (31.5)	2.9 (37.2)	6.0 (42.8)	8.6 (47.5)	8.8 (47.8)	6.3 (43.3)	3.0 (37.4)	0.0 (32.0)	−2.1 (28.2)	2.1 (35.8)
Average precipitation mm (inches)	73 (2.9)	56 (2.2)	57 (2.2)	48 (1.9)	45 (1.8)	50 (2.0)	52 (2.0)	59 (2.3)	76 (3.0)	97 (3.8)	80 (3.1)	85 (3.3)	778 (30.6)
Average precipitation days (≥ 1 mm)	14.5	12.5	12.1	11.9	10.5	11.0	10.9	11.7	15.0	17.4	16.3	15.9	159.7
Source: Norwegian Meteorological Institute

== See also ==
- Lighthouses in Norway
- List of lighthouses in Norway
