= Rosenlund (surname) =

Rosenlund is a surname. In the 1801 Norwegian census, the name was recorded in the Karlsøy parish. In a 2002 study, it is argued that the surname was used by the immigrants in the region.

Notable people with the surname include:

- Andreas Rosenlund (born 1967), Swedish journalist
- John Christian Rosenlund (born 1964), Norwegian cinematographer
- Petter S. Rosenlund (born 1967), Norwegian dramatist
- Thorbjørn Rosenlund (born 1951), Danish chess player
- Tyler Rosenlund (born 1986), Canadian soccer player
