= Vannvåg =

Village in Karlsøy Municipality, Norway

- Village
- Interactive map of Vannvåg
- Location within Troms Location within Norway
- Coordinates: 70.0727°N 19.9821°E
- Country: Norway
- Region: Northern Norway
- County: Troms
- District: Hålogaland
- Municipality: Karlsøy Municipality
- Elevation: 4 m (13 ft)
- Time zone: UTC+01:00 (CET)
  - Summer (DST): UTC+02:00 (CEST)
- Post Code: 9135 Vannvåg

Vannvåg is a village in Karlsøy Municipality in Troms county, Norway. The village is located along the Ullsfjorden on the southeastern shore of the island of Vannøya. The Vannvåg School is the primary school for the eastern part of Vannøya island. There is also a fish farm in the village. The harbour in Vannvåg is newly rebuilt in 2015.

During the Middle Ages, there was a church in Vannvåg, but it was likely closed and torn down during the 1600s.
