= Fugløykalven Lighthouse =

Lighthouse in Karlsøy, Norway

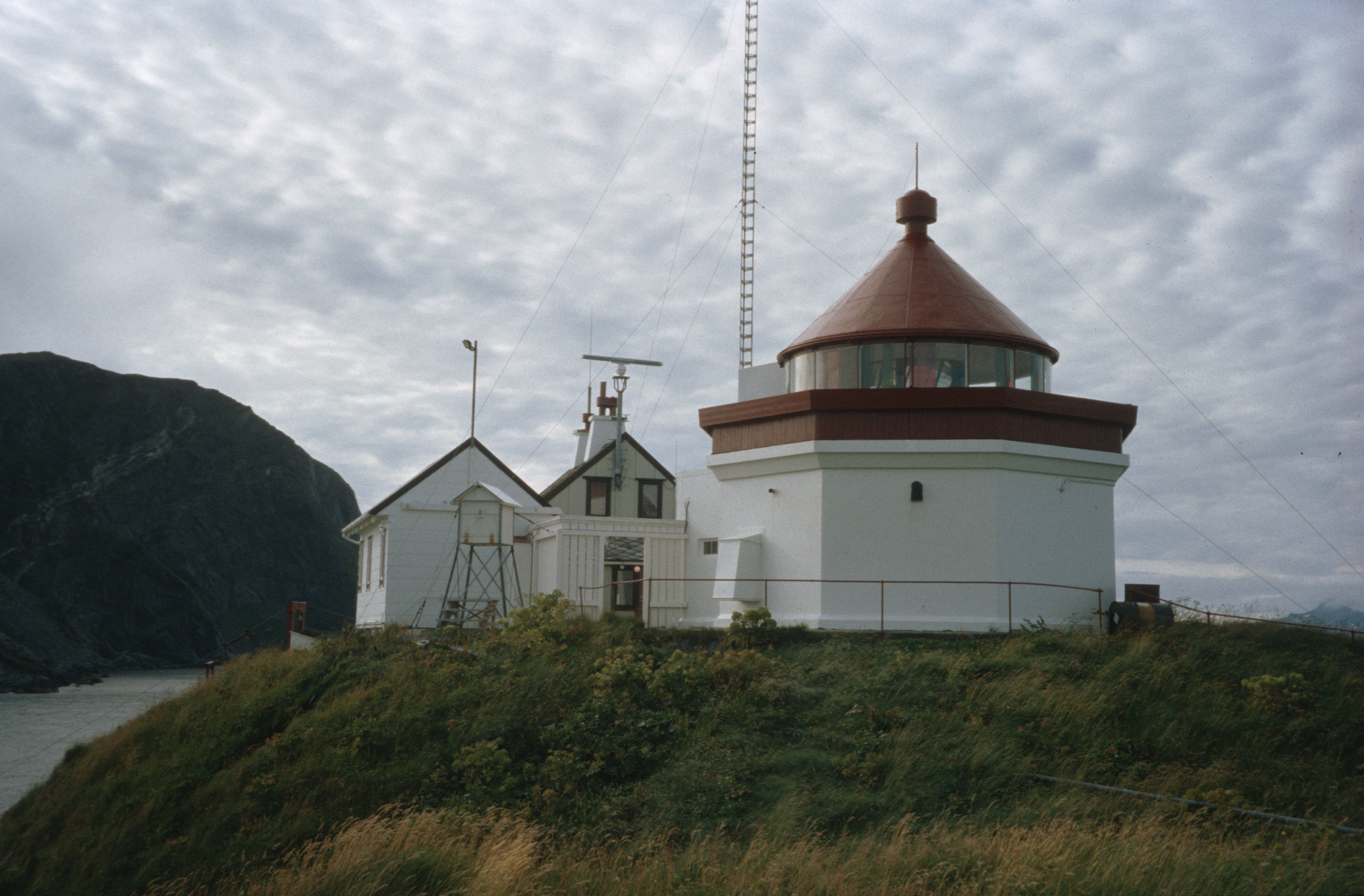
- View of the lighthouse
- Location of the lighthouse
- Location: Karlsøy Municipality, Troms, Norway
- Coordinates: 70°19′00″N 20°09′12″E

Tower
- Constructed: 1916
- Foundation: stone basement
- Construction: stone tower
- Automated: 1987
- Height: 8.5 metres (28 ft)
- Shape: massive octagonal tower with balcony and lantern
- Markings: White with red lantern
- Heritage: cultural heritage preservation in Norway

Light
- First lit: 1920
- Focal height: 41 metres (135 ft)
- Lens: 2nd order Fresnel lens
- Intensity: 38,400 candela
- Range: 16 nmi (30 km; 18 mi)
- Characteristic: Oc (2) WRG 8s.

Fugløykalven Lighthouse (Norwegian: Fugløykalven fyr) is a coastal lighthouse in Karlsøy Municipality in Troms county, Norway. The lighthouse is located on the small island Fugløykalven northwest of the island Nord-Fugløya. This was considered one of the most isolated and difficult assignments of all Norwegian light stations.

== History ==
It was established in 1920 and automated in 2003. The lighthouse is listed as a protected site.

Fugløykalven Lighthouse is an octagonal cylindrical stone tower bearing a large lantern and gallery. The original 2nd order Fresnel lens remains in use; it displays 19 colored sectors, the largest number of any Norwegian light. The lighthouse is painted white and the lantern on top is red. The lighthouse shines white, red, or green light depending on direction, occulting twice every 8 seconds.

== See also ==
- Lighthouses in Norway
- List of lighthouses in Norway
