= Sengskroken Church =

- Sengskroken kirke
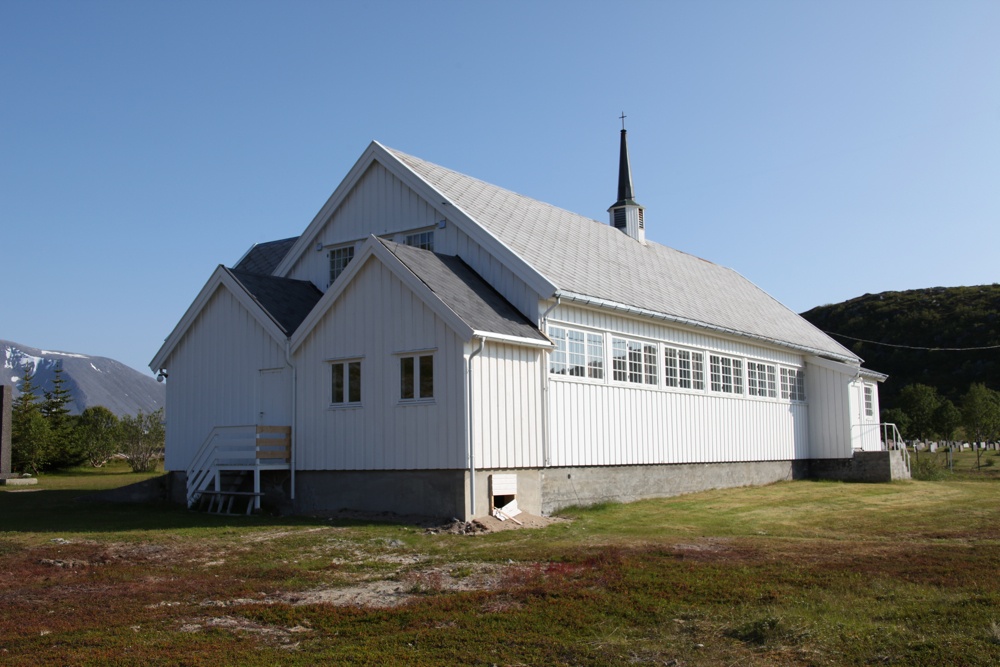
- View of the church
- Sengskroken Church
- 70.1528778°N 19.6701788°E
- Location: Karlsøy Municipality, Troms
- Country: Norway
- Denomination: Church of Norway
- Churchmanship: Evangelical Lutheran

History
- Former name: Sengskroken kapell
- Status: Parish church
- Founded: 1962
- Consecrated: 2 Sept 1962

Architecture
- Functional status: Active
- Architect: Knut P. Bugge
- Architectural type: Long church
- Completed: 1962 (64 years ago)

Specifications
- Capacity: 225
- Materials: Wood

Administration
- Diocese: Nord-Hålogaland
- Deanery: Tromsø domprosti
- Parish: Karlsøy
- Norwegian Cultural Heritage Site
- Type: Church
- Status: Not protected
- ID: 85422

Sengskroken Church (Norwegian: Sengskroken kirke) is a parish church of the Church of Norway in Karlsøy Municipality in Troms county, Norway. It is located on the western coast of the island of Vanna (also known as Vannøya). It is an annex church for the Karlsøy parish which is part of the Tromsø domprosti (arch-deanery) in the Diocese of Nord-Hålogaland. The white, wooden church (originally it was a "chapel") was built in a long church style in 1962 by the architect Knut P. Bugge. The church seats about 225 people.

== History ==
In 1955, a meeting of the local residents on the island of Vanna was held in regards to the need for a church on the island. Land for a chapel was donated by a widow named Petro Hansen. When the work was started, most of the groundwork was done on a voluntary basis. The drawing of the building was the same as for Billefjord Chapel in Finnmark. The actual construction work was carried out by Trygve Larsen, Einar Klingenberg, Johannes Karlsen, and Birger Johansen. The costs totaled 180,000 kr. The new chapel was consecrated on 2 September 1962 by the Bishop Monrad Norderval. In 2009, the classification of the chapel was upgraded to "church" status.

== See also ==
- List of churches in Nord-Hålogaland
