= Lågøya =

Island in Svalbard

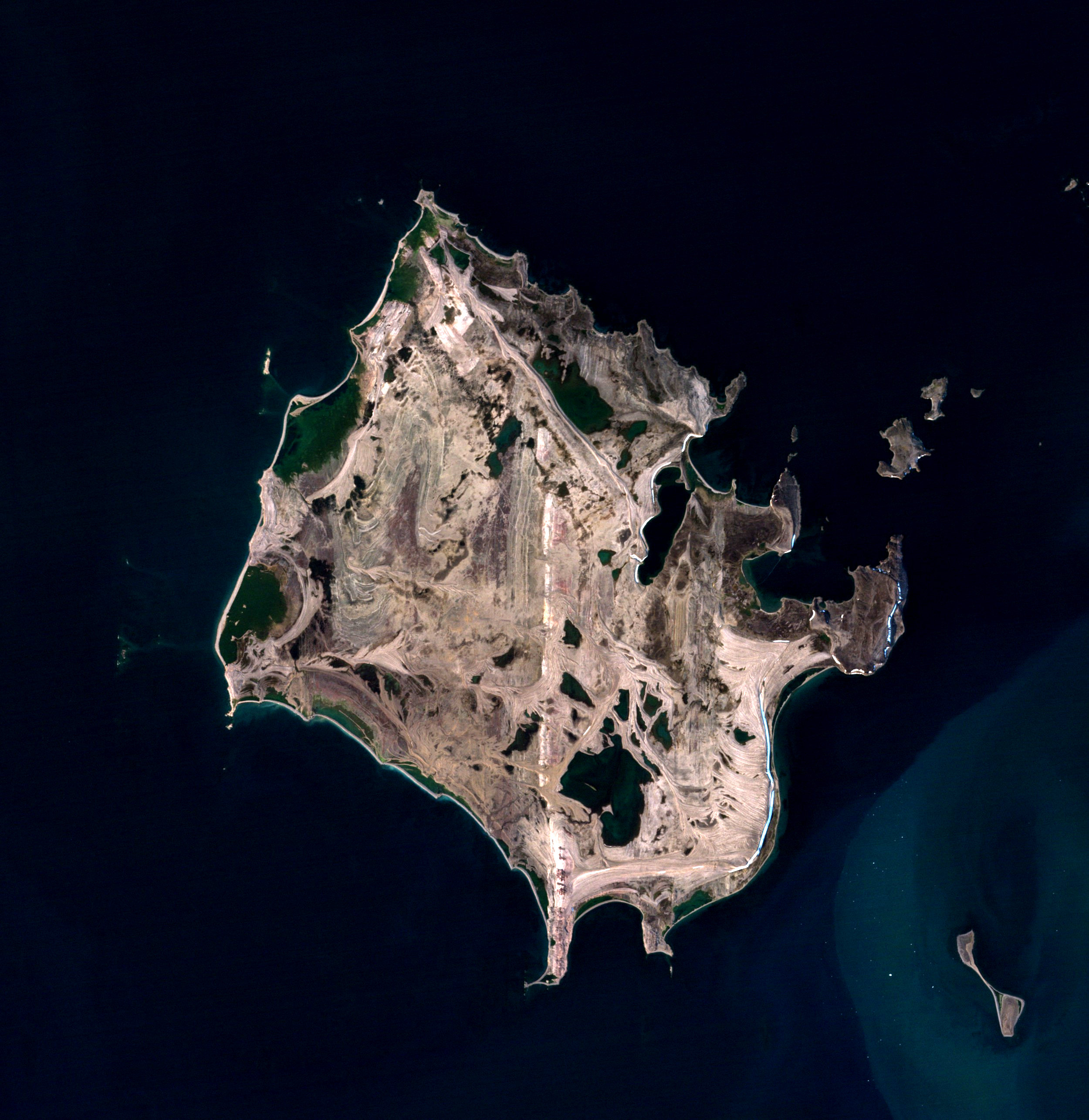
- Sentinel-2 image (2021)
- Interactive map of Lågøya

Geography
- Location: Svalbard, Arctic Ocean
- Coordinates: 80°17′N 18°23′E
- Area: 103.5 km^{2} (40.0 sq mi)
- Highest point: 57 m.a.s.l.

Administration
- Norway

Demographics
- Population: 0

Lågøya (lit. 'Low Island') is an island in Svalbard, Norway, situated north west of Nordaustlandet. It has an area of 103.5 km^{2} (40.0 sq mi).

Lågøya has rarely been visited. It was first marked on the Muscovy Company's map (1625) as Purchas plus ultra Island. Cornelis Giles and Outger Rep (c. 1710) labeled it t' Lage eyl. The island was first marked Low Island by William Scoresby (1820).

== See also ==
- List of islands of Norway
