= Karlsøy Municipality =

Municipality in Troms, Norway

Karlsøy Municipality Karlsøy kommune Gálssa suohkan (Northern Sami)
- Municipality
- Karlsø herred (historic name)
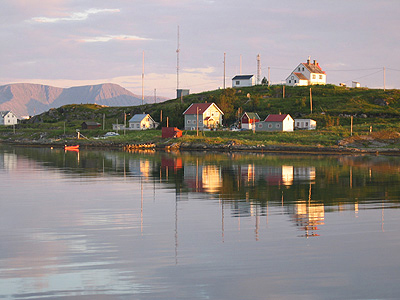
- View of the Kåja island with Torsvåg Lighthouse off Vanna

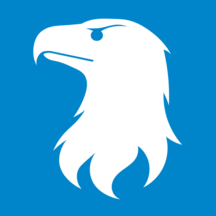
- Flag Coat of arms

- Troms within Norway

- Karlsøy within Troms
- Coordinates: 70°07′48″N 19°25′51″E
- Country: Norway
- County: Troms
- District: Nord-Troms
- Established: 1 Jan 1838
  - Created as: Formannskapsdistrikt
- Administrative centre: Hansnes

Government
  - Mayor (2019): Mona Benjaminsen (Ap)

Area
  - Total: 1,091.60 km^{2} (421.47 sq mi)
  - Land: 1,050.59 km^{2} (405.64 sq mi)
  - Water: 41.01 km^{2} (15.83 sq mi) 3.8%
  - Rank: #103 in Norway
- Highest elevation: 1,049.3 m (3,443 ft)

Population (2024)
  - Total: 2,237
  - Rank: #268 in Norway
  - Density: 2/km^{2} (5.2/sq mi)
  - Change (10 years): ▼ −4.2%
- Demonym: Karlsøyværing

Official language
  - Norwegian form: Neutral
- Time zone: UTC+01:00 (CET)
  - Summer (DST): UTC+02:00 (CEST)
- ISO 3166 code: NO-5534
- Website: Official website

Karlsøy (Northern Sami: Gálssa suohkan) is an island municipality in Troms county, Norway. The administrative centre of the municipality is the village of Hansnes. Other villages include Dåfjord, Hessfjord, Karlsøya, Torsvåg, Vannvåg, and Vannareid. The municipality is made up of many islands including Ringvassøya, Reinøya, Vannøya, Karlsøya, and Rebbenesøya plus several uninhabited islands (many of which were formerly inhabited). Some of the currently uninhabited islands include Helgøya, Nordkvaløya, Grøtøya, and Nordfugløya.

The 1,092-square-kilometre (422 sq mi) municipality is the 103rd largest by area out of the 357 municipalities in Norway. Karlsøy is the 268th most populous municipality in Norway with a population of 2,237. The municipality's population density is 2 inhabitants per square kilometre (5.2/sq mi) and its population has decreased by 4.2% over the previous 10-year period.

== General information ==
Karlsøy has been a Church of Norway parish for many years. Many immigrants, mostly from Finland, resided in Karlsøy as evidenced by the 1801 census. The analysis of the census data revealed that the family names of these people such as Aderup, Blix and Rosenlund were foreign-sounding.

The parish of Karlsøy was established as a municipality on 1 January 1838 (see the formannskapsdistrikt law). On 1 January 1867, the southern district of Karlsøy (population: 862) was transferred from Karlsøy to the neighboring Lyngen Municipality (that area later became part of Ullsfjord Municipality). On 1 September 1886, the western island district of Karlsøy (population: 828) was separated from Karlsøy to become the new Helgøy Municipality. This left Karlsøy with 1,334 inhabitants.

During the 1960s, there were many municipal mergers across Norway due to the work of the Schei Committee. On 1 January 1964, Helgøy Municipality was merged back into Karlsøy Municipality. At the same time, all of the mainland areas of Karlsøy (the northern part of the Lyngen peninsula, with 1,001 inhabitants) was transferred from Karlsøy to neighboring Lyngen Municipality. After all the changes, the new Karlsøy had 3,414 residents. On 1 January 2008, the southern part of the island of Reinøya was transferred from Tromsø Municipality to Karlsøy Municipality.

On 1 January 2020, the municipality became part of the newly formed Troms og Finnmark county. Previously, it had been part of the old Troms county. On 1 January 2024, the Troms og Finnmark county was divided and the municipality once again became part of Troms county.

=== Name ===
The municipality (originally the parish) is named after the small Karlsøya island (Old Norse: Kalsøe) since the first Karlsøy Church was built there. The first element is the genitive case of the male name Karl. The last element is øy which means "island". Historically, the name of the municipality was spelled Karlsø. On 6 January 1908, a royal resolution changed the spelling of the name of the municipality to Karlsøy. The letter y was added to the end of the word to "Norwegianize" the name (ø is the Danish word for "island" and øy is the Norwegian word).

=== Coat of arms ===
The coat of arms was granted on 12 December 1980. The official blazon is "Azure, an eagle head erased argent" (Norwegian: I blått et avrevet sølv ørnehode). This means the arms have a blue field (background) and the charge is the head of a white-tailed eagle. The eagle head has a tincture of argent which means it is commonly colored white, but if it is made out of metal, then silver is used. The blue color in the field symbolizes the importance of the sea to the island community. The eagle head was chosen since one of Europe's largest colonies of these birds is found on the island of Nord-Fugløya in the municipality. Furthermore, the eagle symbolizes the importance of fishing for the municipality. The arms were designed by Hallvard Sandvik.

=== Churches ===
The Church of Norway has one parish (sokn) within Karlsøy Municipality. It is part of the Tromsø domprosti (arch-deanery) in the Diocese of Nord-Hålogaland.

Churches in Karlsøy Municipality
Parish (sokn)	Church name	Location of the church	Year built
Karlsøy	Helgøy Church	Helgøya	1742
Karlsøy	Karlsøy Church	Karlsøya	1854
Karlsøy	Ringvassøy Church	Hansnes	1977
Karlsøy	Sengskroken Church	Vanna	1962

== Economy ==
Karlsøy is among the world's most important exporters of dried and salted cod, with Portugal, Spain, and Brazil among the main markets. The population is almost totally dependent on fishing. There are also goat herding businesses and some musicians that live on the island. There is also some tourism, including a festival that runs in the Summer. There are plans for 50 holiday homes to be built on the isle.

== Geography and nature ==
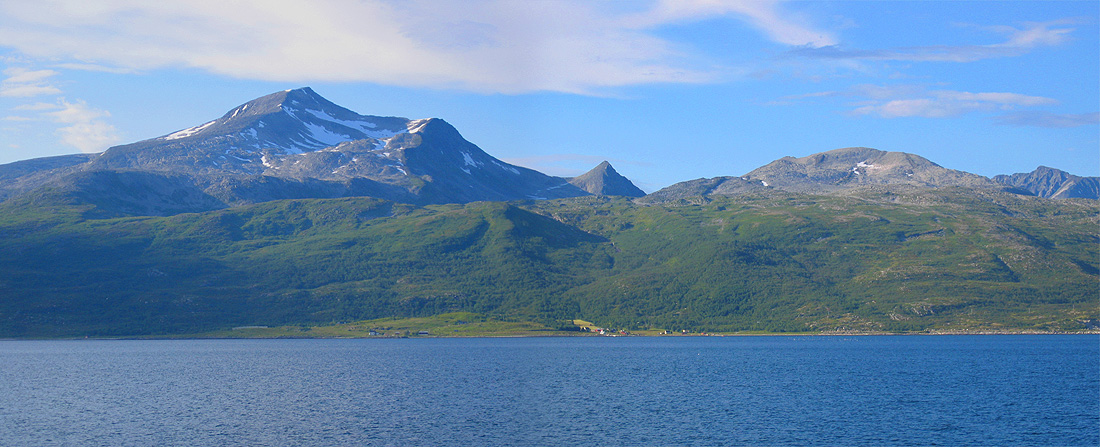
The island Vanna seen from the ferry

The municipality consists of islands only. Ringvassøya, Norway's sixth largest island, is the largest island in the municipality. Nordkvaløya, Helgøya, Karlsøya, Vannøya, Reinøya, and Rebbenesøya are the other major islands. The highest point in the municipality is the 1,049.3-metre (3,443 ft) tall mountain Soltindan on the island of Ringvassøy.

The islands of Rebbenesøya and Ringvassøya are split (as was Reinøya before 2008), with the southern part belonging to neighboring Tromsø Municipality. The reason is that the borders were drawn when boat was the only means of transportation; then it made sense that the southern parts of the islands belonged to Tromsø while the northern parts belonged to Karlsøy. Today, when roads have replaced the boats, the situation is different which is why the Norwegian government transferred all of the island of Reinøy to the Karlsøy Municipality on 1 January 2008.

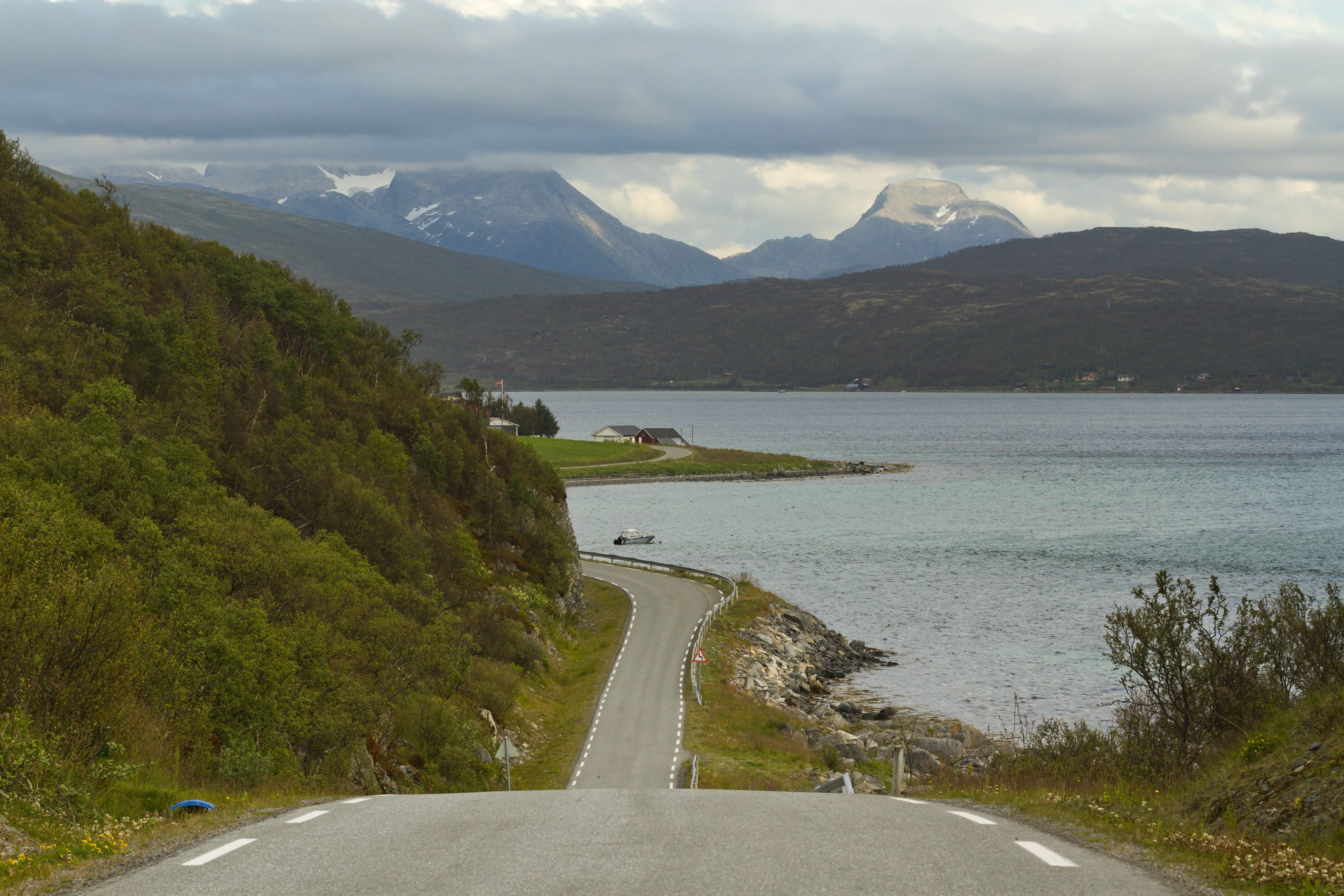
Near Mikkelvik, Ringvassøya island

Karlsøya, the little island after which the municipality is named, has a village with the 19th century Karlsøy Church. The inhabitants include the original inhabitants, hippies, and Norwegian Muslims.

The island of Helgøya, the former seat of the old Helgøy Municipality, in the western part of Karlsøy Municipality, is today a more or less an abandoned village of wooden houses and the old Helgøy Church. The island can only be reached when services are celebrated in the church, and ferry rides are organized.

Lake Skogsfjordvatn, in the centre of Ringvassøya, is a lake with some fishing, surrounded by sub-Arctic forests. This is Norway's largest lake in an island. The island of Vannøya has several villages, including Burøysund and Torsvåg, the latter offering views of the Atlantic from the Torsvåg Lighthouse.

== Climate ==
Karlsøy mostly has a cool oceanic climate (subpolar oceanic climate) using the -3°C isotherm, or a very mild subarctic climate using the 0°C isotherm. Spring and summer is the driest season, while autumn and winter is much wetter. Torsvåg lighthouse has been recording temperature since 1933, and is situated on the northwestern tip of Vanna island. The eastern and inland part of the islands will have slightly warmer summers and slightly colder winters. The record low at Torsvåg is −15.1 °C (4.8 °F) recorded January 1979. The record high 27.2 °C (81.0 °F) is from July 1966. The average date for the last overnight freeze (low below 0 °C (32.0 °F)) in spring is 6 May and average date for first freeze in autumn is 25 October giving a frost-free season of 171 days (1981-2010 average for Torsvåg).

Climate data for Torsvåg 1991-2020 (21 m, extremes 1939-2025)
Month	Jan	Feb	Mar	Apr	May	Jun	Jul	Aug	Sep	Oct	Nov	Dec	Year
Record high °C (°F)	9.6 (49.3)	10 (50)	10 (50)	15.8 (60.4)	22.4 (72.3)	26.1 (79.0)	27.2 (81.0)	26.5 (79.7)	22.9 (73.2)	19 (66)	13.8 (56.8)	12.5 (54.5)	27.2 (81.0)
Mean daily maximum °C (°F)	1.8 (35.2)	1.4 (34.5)	2 (36)	4.3 (39.7)	7.9 (46.2)	11 (52)	14.1 (57.4)	13.6 (56.5)	11 (52)	6.8 (44.2)	4.4 (39.9)	2.9 (37.2)	6.8 (44.2)
Daily mean °C (°F)	0 (32)	−0.4 (31.3)	0.1 (32.2)	2.2 (36.0)	5.5 (41.9)	8.5 (47.3)	11.3 (52.3)	11.2 (52.2)	8.9 (48.0)	5.2 (41.4)	2.8 (37.0)	1.2 (34.2)	4.7 (40.5)
Mean daily minimum °C (°F)	−1.6 (29.1)	−2.1 (28.2)	−1.5 (29.3)	0.5 (32.9)	3.6 (38.5)	6.5 (43.7)	9.2 (48.6)	9.4 (48.9)	7.3 (45.1)	3.6 (38.5)	1.3 (34.3)	−0.4 (31.3)	3.0 (37.4)
Record low °C (°F)	−15.1 (4.8)	−14 (7)	−12.3 (9.9)	−9.1 (15.6)	−4.6 (23.7)	−2 (28)	2.8 (37.0)	3 (37)	−1.6 (29.1)	−5.4 (22.3)	−9.6 (14.7)	−11.9 (10.6)	−15.1 (4.8)
Average precipitation mm (inches)	87 (3.4)	73 (2.9)	75 (3.0)	53 (2.1)	47 (1.9)	41 (1.6)	49 (1.9)	69 (2.7)	81 (3.2)	106 (4.2)	85 (3.3)	90 (3.5)	856 (33.7)
Source 1: Norwegian Meteorological Institute
Source 2: NOAA - WMO averages 91-2020 Norway

Climate data for Torsvåg 1961-1990
Month	Jan	Feb	Mar	Apr	May	Jun	Jul	Aug	Sep	Oct	Nov	Dec	Year
Mean daily maximum °C (°F)	0.7 (33.3)	0.6 (33.1)	1.3 (34.3)	3.2 (37.8)	6.9 (44.4)	10.8 (51.4)	13.6 (56.5)	13.2 (55.8)	9.9 (49.8)	6.3 (43.3)	3.3 (37.9)	1.5 (34.7)	5.9 (42.6)
Daily mean °C (°F)	−1.1 (30.0)	−1.2 (29.8)	−0.5 (31.1)	1.4 (34.5)	4.8 (40.6)	8.0 (46.4)	10.8 (51.4)	10.7 (51.3)	7.9 (46.2)	4.6 (40.3)	1.6 (34.9)	−0.3 (31.5)	3.9 (39.0)
Mean daily minimum °C (°F)	−2.9 (26.8)	−3.0 (26.6)	−2.2 (28.0)	−0.3 (31.5)	2.9 (37.2)	6.0 (42.8)	8.6 (47.5)	8.8 (47.8)	6.3 (43.3)	3.0 (37.4)	0.0 (32.0)	−2.1 (28.2)	2.1 (35.8)
Average precipitation mm (inches)	73 (2.9)	56 (2.2)	57 (2.2)	48 (1.9)	45 (1.8)	50 (2.0)	52 (2.0)	59 (2.3)	76 (3.0)	97 (3.8)	80 (3.1)	85 (3.3)	778 (30.6)
Average precipitation days (≥ 1 mm)	14.5	12.5	12.1	11.9	10.5	11.0	10.9	11.7	15.0	17.4	16.3	15.9	159.7
Source: Norwegian Meteorological Institute

== Government ==
Karlsøy Municipality is responsible for primary education (through 10th grade), outpatient health services, senior citizen services, welfare and other social services, zoning, economic development, and municipal roads and utilities. The municipality is governed by a municipal council of directly elected representatives. The mayor is indirectly elected by a vote of the municipal council. The municipality is under the jurisdiction of the Nord-Troms og Senja District Court and the Hålogaland Court of Appeal.

=== Municipal council ===
The municipal council (Kommunestyre) of Karlsøy Municipality is made up of 17 representatives that are elected to four year terms. The tables below show the current and historical composition of the council by political party.

Karlsøy kommunestyre 2023–2027
Party name (in Norwegian)	Number of representatives
Labour Party (Arbeiderpartiet)	5
Progress Party (Fremskrittspartiet)	3
Red Party (Rødt)	1
Centre Party (Senterpartiet)	4
Socialist Left Party (Sosialistisk Venstreparti)	2
List for Ringvassøy, Reinøy, & Rebbenesøy (Felleslista for Ringvassøy, Reinøy, og Rebbenesøy)	1
Karlsøy Pension List (Karlsøy Pensjonistliste)	1
Total number of members:	17

Karlsøy kommunestyre 2019–2023
Party name (in Norwegian)	Number of representatives
Labour Party (Arbeiderpartiet)	3
Progress Party (Fremskrittspartiet)	2
Centre Party (Senterpartiet)	5
Socialist Left Party (Sosialistisk Venstreparti)	2
Karlsøy Common List (Karlsøy Fellesliste)	5
Total number of members:	17

Karlsøy kommunestyre 2015–2019
Party name (in Norwegian)	Number of representatives
Labour Party (Arbeiderpartiet)	4
Progress Party (Fremskrittspartiet)	4
Conservative Party (Høyre)	1
Centre Party (Senterpartiet)	3
Socialist Left Party (Sosialistisk Venstreparti)	2
Common List for Ringvassøy, Reinøy, and Rebbenesøy (Felleslista for Ringvassøy, Reinøy, og Rebbenesøy)	3
Total number of members:	17

Karlsøy kommunestyre 2011–2015
Party name (in Norwegian)	Number of representatives
Labour Party (Arbeiderpartiet)	6
Progress Party (Fremskrittspartiet)	4
Coastal Party (Kystpartiet)	2
Centre Party (Senterpartiet)	2
Socialist Left Party (Sosialistisk Venstreparti)	1
Common List for Ringvassøy, Reinøy, and Rebbenesøy (Felleslista for Ringvassøy, Reinøy, og Rebbenesøy)	2
Total number of members:	17

Karlsøy kommunestyre 2007–2011
Party name (in Norwegian)	Number of representatives
Labour Party (Arbeiderpartiet)	5
Progress Party (Fremskrittspartiet)	5
Coastal Party (Kystpartiet)	2
Centre Party (Senterpartiet)	2
Socialist Left Party (Sosialistisk Venstreparti)	2
Reinøy List (Reinøylista)	1
Total number of members:	17

Karlsøy kommunestyre 2003–2007
Party name (in Norwegian)	Number of representatives
Labour Party (Arbeiderpartiet)	5
Progress Party (Fremskrittspartiet)	2
Conservative Party (Høyre)	1
Coastal Party (Kystpartiet)	6
Centre Party (Senterpartiet)	2
Socialist Left Party (Sosialistisk Venstreparti)	3
Total number of members:	19

Karlsøy kommunestyre 1999–2003
Party name (in Norwegian)	Number of representatives
Labour Party (Arbeiderpartiet)	8
Progress Party (Fremskrittspartiet)	3
Conservative Party (Høyre)	1
Centre Party (Senterpartiet)	8
Socialist Left Party (Sosialistisk Venstreparti)	2
Common list for Rebbenesøy, Ringvassøy og Reinøy (Fellesliste for Rebbenesøy, Ringvassøy og Reinøy)	2
Western Vannøy non-party list (Vestre Vannøy upolitiske liste)	1
Total number of members:	25

Karlsøy kommunestyre 1995–1999
Party name (in Norwegian)	Number of representatives
Labour Party (Arbeiderpartiet)	7
Progress Party (Fremskrittspartiet)	2
Conservative Party (Høyre)	1
Centre Party (Senterpartiet)	9
Socialist Left Party (Sosialistisk Venstreparti)	2
Common list for Rebbenesøy, Ringvassøy og Reinøy (Fellesliste for Rebbenesøy, Ringvassøy og Reinøy)	3
Western Vannøy non-party list (Vestre Vannøy upolitiske liste)	1
Total number of members:	25

Karlsøy kommunestyre 1991–1995
Party name (in Norwegian)	Number of representatives
Labour Party (Arbeiderpartiet)	8
Progress Party (Fremskrittspartiet)	1
Conservative Party (Høyre)	2
Centre Party (Senterpartiet)	6
Socialist Left Party (Sosialistisk Venstreparti)	3
Common list for Rebbenesøy, Ringvassøy og Reinøy (Fellesliste for Rebbenesøy, Ringvassøy og Reinøy)	4
Western Vannøy non-party list (Vestre Vannøy upolitiske liste)	3
Total number of members:	27

Karlsøy kommunestyre 1987–1991
Party name (in Norwegian)	Number of representatives
Labour Party (Arbeiderpartiet)	14
Conservative Party (Høyre)	3
Centre Party (Senterpartiet)	3
Common list for Rebbenesøy, Ringvassøy og Reinøy (Fellesliste for Rebbenesøy, Ringvassøy og Reinøy)	7
Western Vannøy non-party list (Vestre Vannøy upolitiske liste)	2
Total number of members:	29

Karlsøy kommunestyre 1983–1987
Party name (in Norwegian)	Number of representatives
Labour Party (Arbeiderpartiet)	15
Conservative Party (Høyre)	3
Christian Democratic Party (Kristelig Folkeparti)	1
Centre Party (Senterpartiet)	3
Liberal Party (Venstre)	1
Common list for Rebbenesøy, Ringvassøy og Reinøy (Fellesliste for Rebbenesøy, Ringvassøy og Reinøy)	5
Socialist Unity List (Sosialistisk enhetsliste)	1
Total number of members:	29

Karlsøy kommunestyre 1979–1983
Party name (in Norwegian)	Number of representatives
Labour Party (Arbeiderpartiet)	16
Conservative Party (Høyre)	5
Christian Democratic Party (Kristelig Folkeparti)	1
Centre Party (Senterpartiet)	6
Liberal Party (Venstre)	1
Total number of members:	29

Karlsøy kommunestyre 1975–1979
Party name (in Norwegian)	Number of representatives
Labour Party (Arbeiderpartiet)	13
Christian Democratic Party (Kristelig Folkeparti)	2
Centre Party (Senterpartiet)	9
Vannøy Non-party List (Vannøy Upolitiske Liste)	2
Independent Voters (Uavhengige Velgere)	3
Total number of members:	29

Karlsøy kommunestyre 1971–1975
Party name (in Norwegian)	Number of representatives
Labour Party (Arbeiderpartiet)	16
Local List(s) (Lokale lister)	13
Total number of members:	29

Karlsøy kommunestyre 1967–1971
Party name (in Norwegian)	Number of representatives
Labour Party (Arbeiderpartiet)	20
Conservative Party (Høyre)	3
Liberal Party (Venstre)	6
Total number of members:	29

Karlsøy kommunestyre 1963–1967
Party name (in Norwegian)	Number of representatives
Labour Party (Arbeiderpartiet)	11
List of workers, fishermen, and small farmholders (Arbeidere, fiskere, småbrukere liste)	9
Local List(s) (Lokale lister)	9
Total number of members:	29
Note: On 1 January 1964, Helgøy Municipality became part of Karlsøy Municipality.

Karlsøy herredsstyre 1959–1963
Party name (in Norwegian)	Number of representatives
Local List(s) (Lokale lister)	21
Total number of members:	21

Karlsøy herredsstyre 1955–1959
Party name (in Norwegian)	Number of representatives
Local List(s) (Lokale lister)	21
Total number of members:	21

Karlsøy herredsstyre 1951–1955
Party name (in Norwegian)	Number of representatives
Local List(s) (Lokale lister)	16
Total number of members:	16

Karlsøy herredsstyre 1947–1951
Party name (in Norwegian)	Number of representatives
Labour Party (Arbeiderpartiet)	5
List of workers, fishermen, and small farmholders (Arbeidere, fiskere, småbrukere liste)	1
Local List(s) (Lokale lister)	10
Total number of members:	16

Karlsøy herredsstyre 1945–1947
Party name (in Norwegian)	Number of representatives
Local List(s) (Lokale lister)	16
Total number of members:	16

Karlsøy herredsstyre 1937–1941*
Party name (in Norwegian)	Number of representatives
Labour Party (Arbeiderpartiet)	7
List of workers, fishermen, and small farmholders (Arbeidere, fiskere, småbrukere liste)	3
Joint List(s) of Non-Socialist Parties (Borgerlige Felleslister)	4
Local List(s) (Lokale lister)	2
Total number of members:	16
Note: Due to the German occupation of Norway during World War II, no elections were held for new municipal councils until after the war ended in 1945.

=== Mayors ===
The mayor (Norwegian: ordfører) of Karlsøy Municipality is the political leader of the municipality and the chairperson of the municipal council. Here is a list of people who have held this position:

- 1838–1841: Nils Jønsberg
- 1841–1845: Ole Ulrich Berg
- 1846–1849: Hans Julius Knudsen
- 1850–1855: Anders Selquist
- 1856–1860: Fredrik Altmann
- 1861–1862: Anders Selquist
- 1863–1864: Ole Rasmussen Bræk
- 1865–1866: Ole Jørgen Falch
- 1867–1867: Hans Martin Høegh
- 1869–1873: Stener Johannes Tandberg
- 1874–1898: Adolf Martin Helberg
- 1899–1903: Alfred Eriksen (V)
- 1904–1919: Martin Simonsen (Ap)
- 1920–1922: Peder Dahl (V)
- 1923–1924: Martin Simonsen (Ap)
- 1925–1928: Anton B. Haugjord (Ap)
- 1929–1931: Mikal Petersen (Ap)
- 1932–1934: Anton B. Haugjord (Ap)
- 1935–1937: Sivert Nordeide (Ap)
- 1937–1941: Arthur Sandvik (V)
- 1941–1944: Sverre Hoel (NS)
- 1945–1945: Alv Gaasland (NS)
- 1945–1947: Arthur Sandvik (V)
- 1947–1950: Olav Simonsen (Ap)
- 1950–1960: Birger Aspenes (Ap)
- 1960–1961: Johannes Johnsen (Ap)
- 1961–1969: Harald Larsen (LL)
- 1969–1983: Otto Klemetsen (Ap)
- 1983–1987: Jan Hugo Sørensen (Ap)
- 1987–1999: Thor Tøllefsen (Sp)
- 1999–2003: Hanny Ditlefsen (Ap)
- 2003–2007: Thor Tøllefsen (Kp)
- 2007–2011: Bent Gabrielsen (Ap)
- 2011–2015: Hanny Ditlefsen (Ap)
- 2015–2019: Mona Pedersen (LL)
- 2019–present: Mona Benjaminsen (Ap)

== Transportation ==
The municipal centre is at Hansnes, which can be reached through an undersea tunnel from Tromsø, and the drive is about one hour. From here ferries depart to Vannøya, Reinøya, and Karlsøya. The Langsund Tunnel is under construction and was planned to be completed by 2015, but it is currently on hiatus. It is expected to connect the islands of Reinøya and Ringvassøya. The few inhabitants of Rebbenesøya are served by a ferry from Mikkelvik on the western side of Ringvassøya.

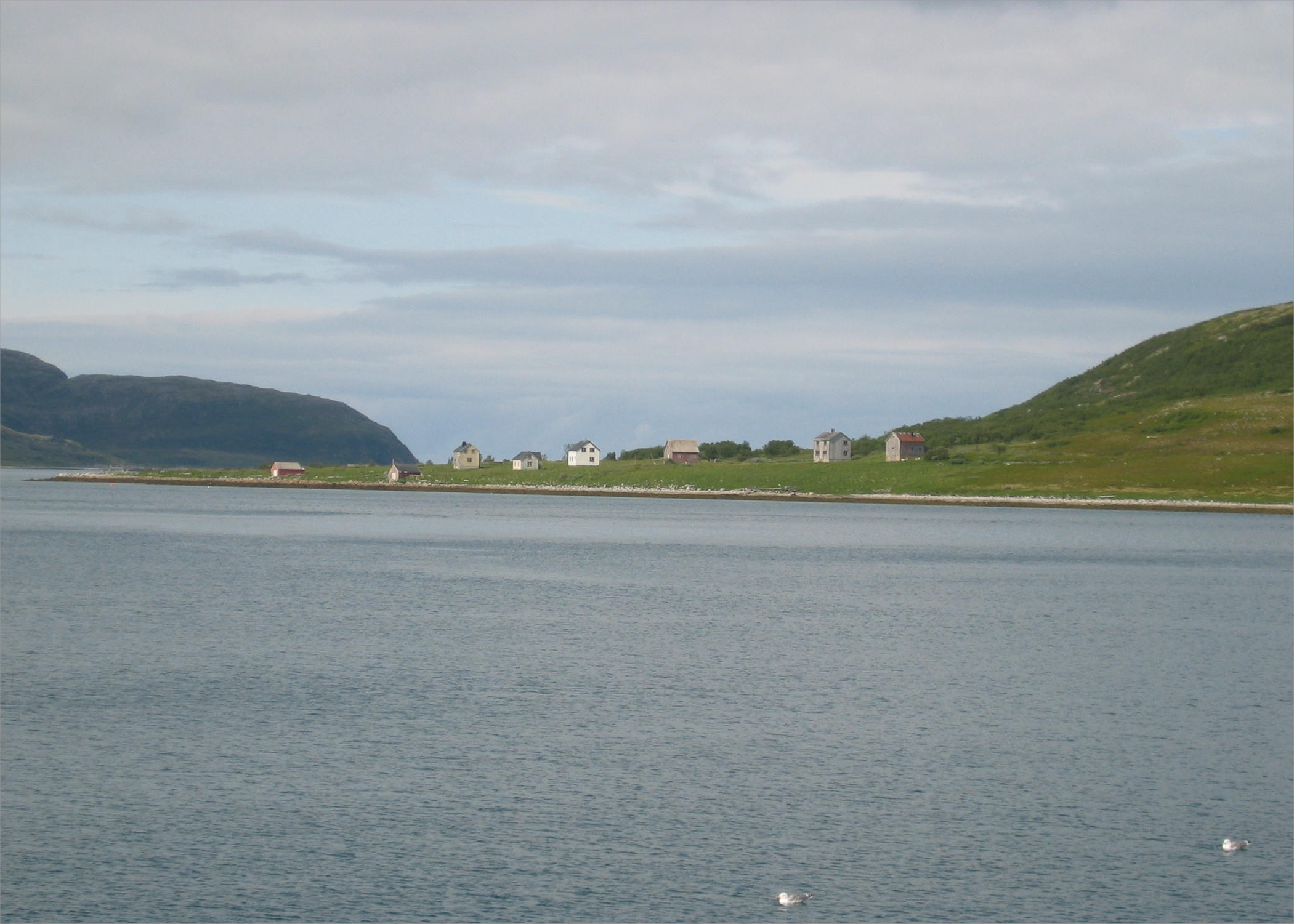
View from Burøysund

== Attractions ==
Karlsøy attractions include:

- The island of Nordfugløya, one of Norway's major bird cliffs, including puffin colonies.
- Fugløykalven Lighthouse, northwest of Nord-Fugløya
- There is a flat high plateau on Nordfugløya, 600 m (2,000 ft) above sea level, where Arctic cloudberries grow. The island can only be reached in the cloudberry season, when picking expeditions are organized from Burøysund.

== Notable people ==
- Karl Marthinsen (1896 in Karlsøy – 1945), the Norwegian commander of Statspolitiet during the Nazi occupation in WWII
- Solvejg Eriksen (1903 in Karlsøy – 1993), a journalist, author, and women's rights activist
- Marthe Kristoffersen (born 1989 in Vannøya), a cross-country skier who competed at the 2010 Winter Olympics
