= Caltexfjellet =

Mountain in Svalbard

Coordinates: 77.9403°N 21.7564°E

Caltexfjellet is a mountain in Edgeøya, Svalbard. It is located east of the plain of Raddesletta. The mountain is named after the petroleum company Caltex which purchased 85% of the mountain in the late 1980s.
