= Ringvassøya =

Island in Troms county, Norway

Ringvassøya (Norwegian) Ráneš (Northern Sami)
- Interactive map of Ringvassøya (Norwegian); Ráneš (Northern Sami)

Geography
- Location: Troms, Norway
- Coordinates: 69.8868°N 19.1729°E
- Area: 663 km^{2} (256 sq mi)
- Area rank: 6th largest in Norway
- Length: 34 km (21.1 mi)
- Width: 37 km (23 mi)
- Highest elevation: 1,051 m (3448 ft)
- Highest point: Soltindan

Administration
- Norway
- County: Troms
- Municipality: Karlsøy and Tromsø

Demographics
- Population: 1,300 (2018)
- Pop. density: 1.98/km^{2} (5.13/sq mi)

Ringvassøya (Norwegian) or Ráneš (Northern Sami) is a large island in Troms county, Norway. It is divided between Tromsø Municipality and Karlsøy Municipality. Several islands surround Ringvassøya including Kvaløya to the south; Reinøya and Karlsøya to the east; Vannøya, Helgøya, and Nordkvaløya to the north; and Rebbenesøya to the north west. The island is connected to the neighboring island (and the rest of mainland Norway) by the Kvalsund Tunnel on the south shore of the island.

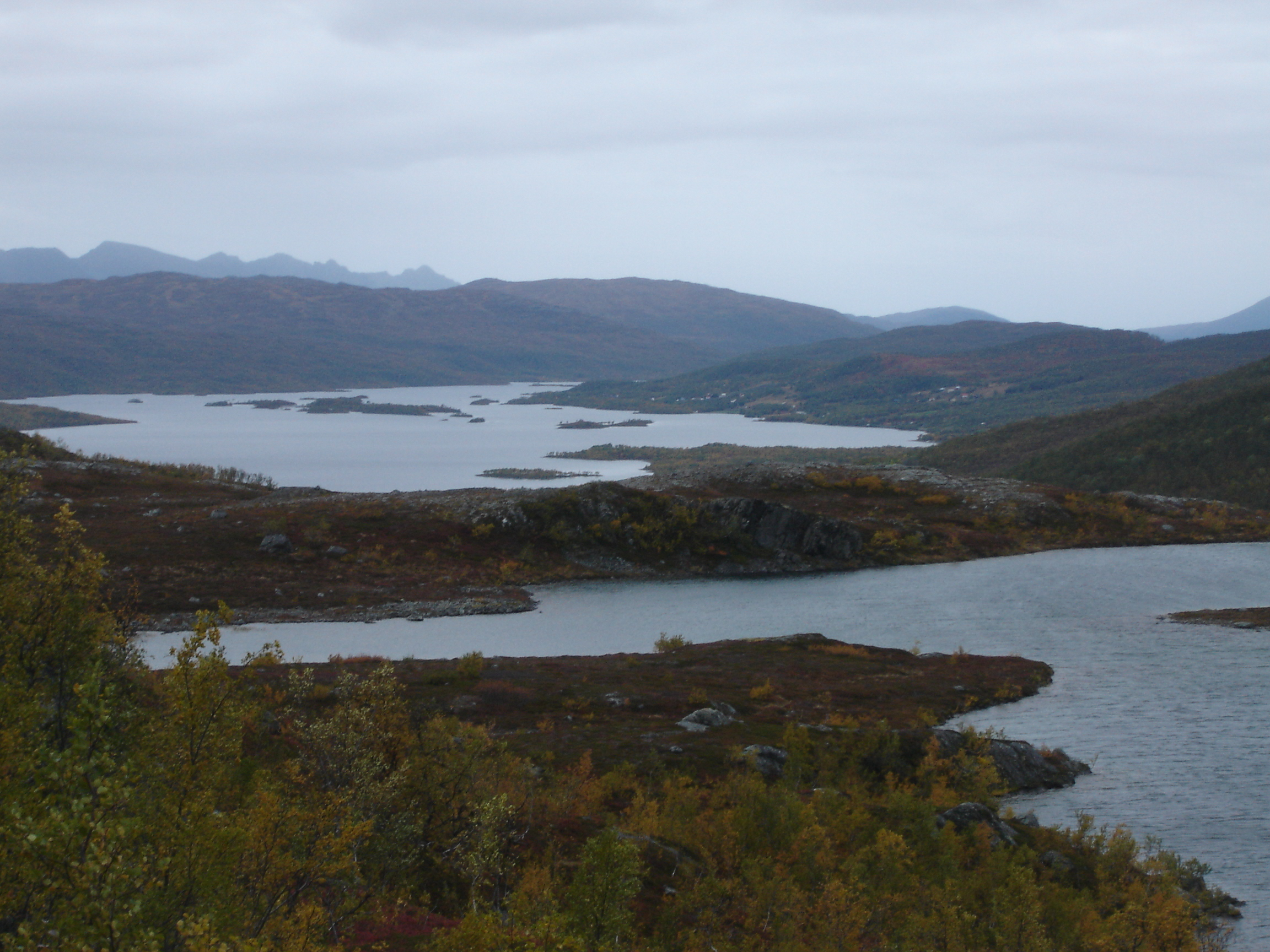
View of Skogsfjordvatn lake on Ringvassøya

With an area of 663 square kilometres (256 sq mi), Ringvassøy is the sixth largest island in mainland Norway. The island's highest point, Soltindan, has a height of 1,051 metres (3,448 ft) above sea level. The 10-kilometre (6.2 mi) long Skogsfjordvatnet is the largest lake on an island in Norway.

The villages of Hansnes (the administrative centre of Karlsøy Municipality), Hessfjord, Indre Kårvik, and Skarsfjord are all located on the island. In 2018, there were about 1,300 people living on the island.

== See also ==
- List of islands of Norway
