= Soltindan =

Mountain in Karlsøy, Norway

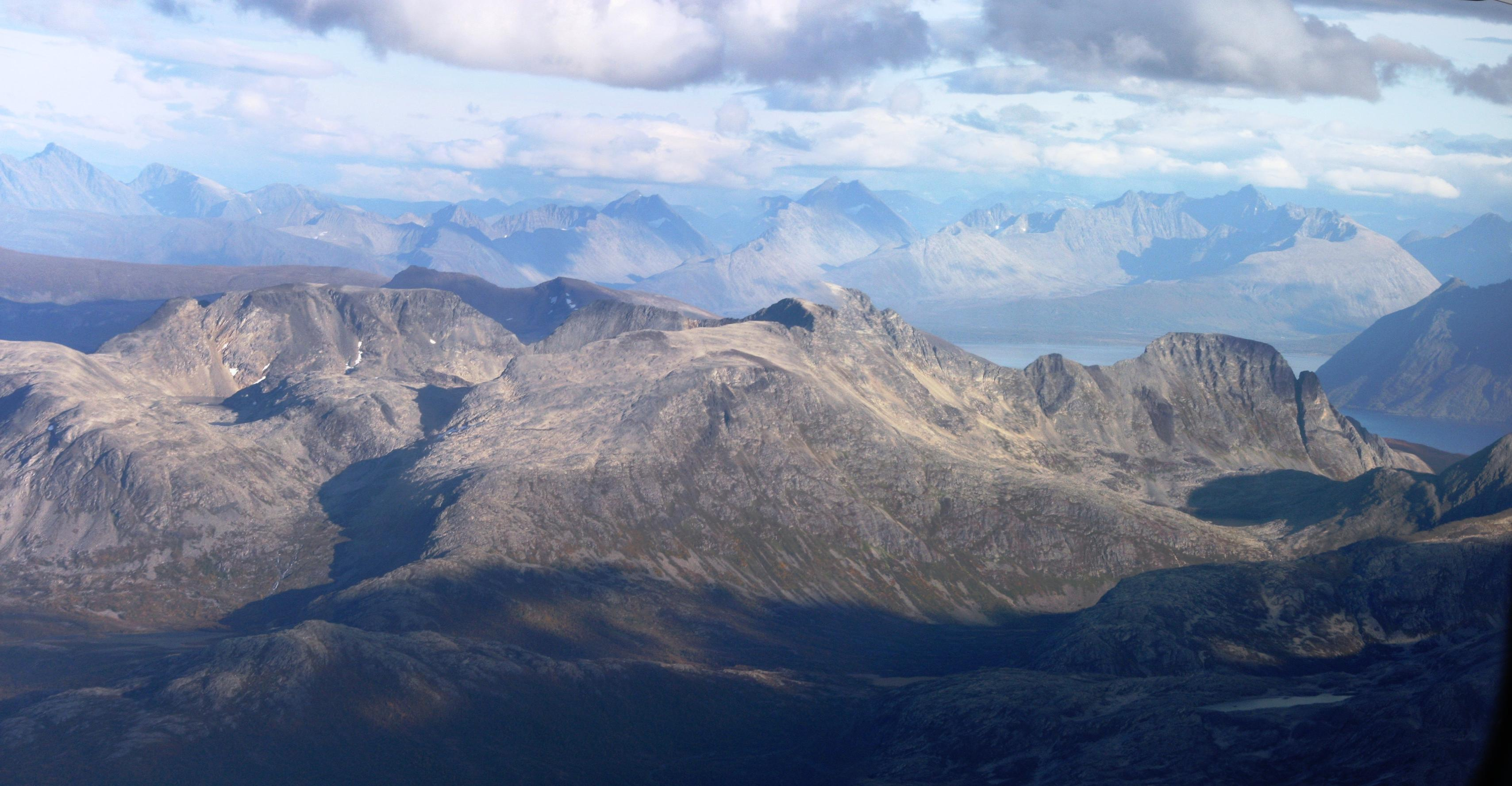
- Panorama of Soltindan

Highest point
- Elevation: 1,049 m (3,442 ft)
- Prominence: 1,049 m (3,442 ft)
- Isolation: 16 km (9.9 mi)
- Coordinates: 69.8895°N 19.3336°E

Geography
- Location of the mountain
- Location: Troms, Norway

Soltindan is the highest mountain on the island of Ringvassøya which is located in Karlsøy Municipality in Troms county, Norway. It is located just north of the border with Tromsø Municipality, about 14 km (8.7 mi) southwest of the village of Hansnes. The 1,051-metre (3,448 ft) mountain has a topographic prominence of 1,051 metres (3,448 ft) and a topographic isolation of 16 kilometres (9.9 mi). Just to the north of the peak is the small glacial lake, Brevatnet.
