= Sverre Blix =

Norwegian footballer (1885-1967)

Personal information
- Date of birth: 29 August 1885
- Place of birth: Kristiania, Norway
- Date of death: 17 February 1967 (aged 81)
- Position: Midfielder

International career
Years	Team	Apps	(Gls)
1910	Norway	1	(0)

Sverre Blix (29 August 1885 – 17 February 1967) was a Norwegian footballer. He played in one match for the Norway national football team in 1910.
