= Karlsøya (Østfold) =

Island in Sarpsborg, Østfold, Norway

Coordinates: 59°08′47″N 11°08′22″E

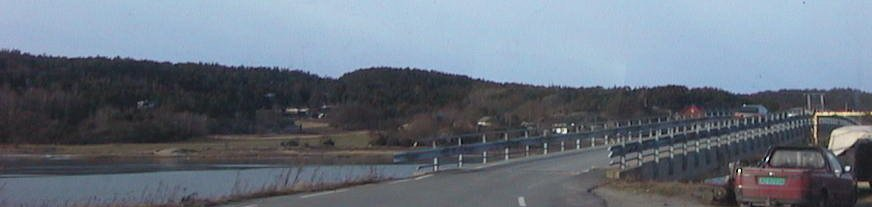
The Karlsøy Bridge.

Karlsøya is an island in the municipality of Sarpsborg, in Østfold county, Norway. Before 1992, Karlsøya was a part of Skjeberg municipality. The island's only connection with the mainland is a bridge that connects the island with the peninsula of Ullerøy.
