= Nordfugløya =

Island in Troms, Norway

Nordfugløya (Norwegian); Nuorta-Vuovlá (Northern Sami)
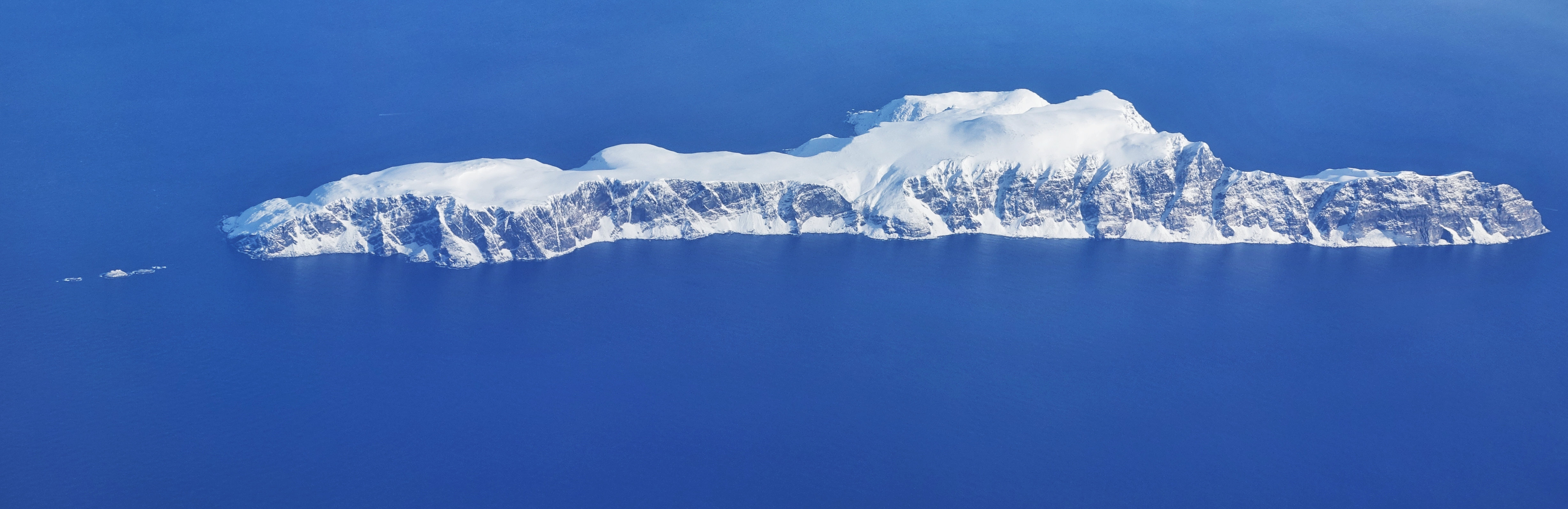
- Nordfugløya
- Interactive map of: Nordfugløya (Norwegian); Nuorta-Vuovlá (Northern Sami)

Geography
- Location: Troms, Norway
- Coordinates: 70.2417°N 20.2270°E
- Area: 21.3 km^{2} (8.2 sq mi)
- Highest elevation: 750 m (2460 ft)
- Highest point: Fugløykallen

Administration
- Norway
- County: Troms
- Municipality: Karlsøy Municipality

Nordfugløya (Norwegian) or Nuorta-Vuovlá (Northern Sami) is an uninhabited island in Karlsøy Municipality in Troms, Norway. The highest mountain is the 750-metre (2,460 ft) tall Fugløykallen. Fugløykalven Lighthouse is located north of the island.

== Nature reserve ==
The whole island is protected as a nature reserve which, along with the adjacent marine waters, has also been designated an Important Bird Area (IBA) by BirdLife International because it supports large breeding colonies of Atlantic puffins and razorbills.

== See also ==
- List of islands of Norway
