= Michael Blix =

Norwegian politician

Michael Blix (23 May 1786 – 1 November 1870) was a Norwegian politician.

He was elected to the Norwegian Parliament in 1842, representing the rural constituency of Finmarkens Amt (today named Finnmark). He worked as a farmer. He served only one term.
