= Vanna (Troms) =

Island in Troms, Norway

Vannøya / Vanna (Norwegian); Várdná (Northern Sami)
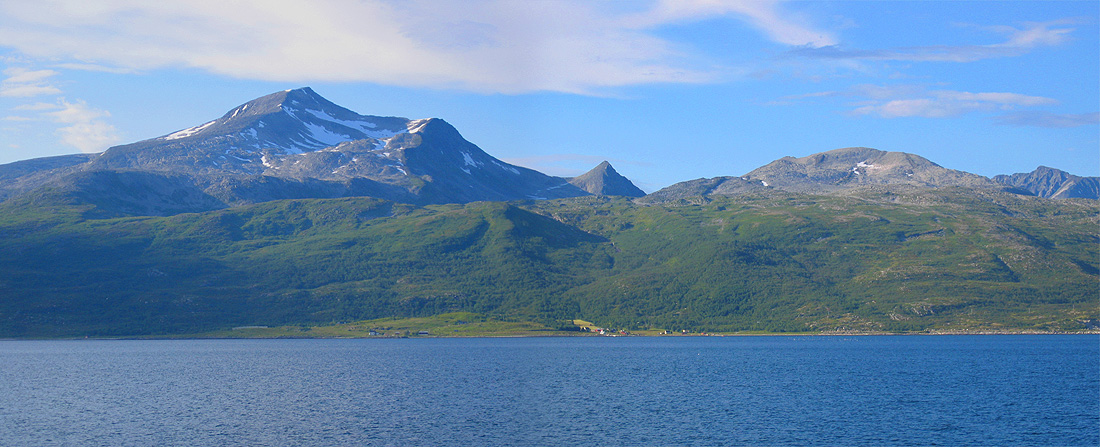
- View of the island
- Interactive map of: Vannøya / Vanna (Norwegian); Várdná (Northern Sami)

Geography
- Location: Troms, Norway
- Coordinates: 70.1819°N 19.7008°E
- Area: 232 km^{2} (90 sq mi)
- Area rank: 17th largest in Norway
- Length: 30 km (19 mi)
- Width: 16 km (9.9 mi)
- Highest elevation: 1,031 m (3383 ft)
- Highest point: Vanntinden

Administration
- Norway
- County: Troms
- Municipality: Karlsøy Municipality

Demographics
- Population: 799 (2017)
- Pop. density: 3.4/km^{2} (8.8/sq mi)

Vannøya or Vanna (Norwegian) or Várdná (Northern Sami) is a rocky island in Karlsøy Municipality in Troms county, Norway. At 232 square kilometres (90 sq mi), Vanna is the 17th largest island in Norway by area. The highest peak is the mountain Vanntinden at a height of 1,031 metres (3,383 ft) above sea level. The population of the island (2017) is 799. Vannvåg and Vannareid are the two main population centres on the island. Sengskroken Church is located on the western coast of the island.

The islands of Nordkvaløya and Helgøya lie to the west of the island, and Nord-Fugløya and Arnøya lie to the east of it. Karlsøya, Reinøya, and Ringvassøya are located to the south of the island. There is ferry service to Karlsøya and Ringvassøya departing from the village of Skanningen on the southern tip of Vanna.

== See also ==
- List of islands of Norway
