= Skarsfjord =

Skarsfjord is a Norwegian surname. Notable people with the surname include:

- Rune Skarsfjord (born 1970), Norwegian football manager
- Terje Skarsfjord (1942–2018), Norwegian footballer and manager
