= Helgøy Church =

- Helgøy kirke
- Helgøy Church
- 70.1127156°N 19.3601149°E
- Location: Karlsøy Municipality, Troms
- Country: Norway
- Denomination: Church of Norway
- Churchmanship: Evangelical Lutheran

History
- Status: Parish church
- Founded: 15th century
- Consecrated: 1889
- Events: 1889: Moved building to Helgøya

Architecture
- Functional status: Active
- Architectural type: Long church
- Completed: 1741 (285 years ago)

Specifications
- Capacity: 350
- Materials: Wood

Administration
- Diocese: Nord-Hålogaland
- Deanery: Tromsø domprosti
- Parish: Karlsøy
- Norwegian Cultural Heritage Site
- Type: Church
- Status: Listed
- ID: 84531

Helgøy Church (Norwegian: Helgøy kirke) is a historic parish church of the Church of Norway in Karlsøy Municipality in Troms county, Norway. It is located on the small unpopulated island of Helgøya. It is a little-used annex church for the Karlsøy parish which is part of the Tromsø domprosti (arch-deanery) in the Diocese of Nord-Hålogaland. The 350-seat church is no longer in regular use since the island of Helgøya is no longer populated. The last confirmation class at the church was confirmed in 1966. The population of the island decreased steadily until it no longer had permanent residents. Today, the island is used for summer vacation homes and the church is now only used on occasion for special services, including one summer service each year.

== History ==
The earliest existing historical records of the church date back to the year 1580, but the church was likely built in the late 1400s and was subject to the priest in Tromsø. The old church was located about 200–250 metres (660–820 ft) northwest of the present church site. A new church was built on the site around the year 1660. This was a timber-framed long church with a west tower, sacristy, and an entry porch.

Around 1889, the old church was torn down and replaced with a church from another location. The new church was built about 200–250 metres (660–820 ft) to the southeast on the island of Helgøya. This new church was not actually new—it had a long history before arriving at Helgøy. The building was originally constructed in 1741 as Hemnes Church in what is now Hemnes Municipality in Helgeland. Then, in 1872, the building was taken down and moved to Hamn in Berg Municipality on the island of Senja. It was rebuilt there as a church by the nickel plant. When the plant closed in 1888, the church was once again dismantled and moved to Helgøya to replace the earlier church building. This newly rebuilt church was consecrated on 7 March 1889 by the Bishop Johannes Skaar. This "new" white, wooden church was built in a long church style with a steeple. The church seats about 350 people.

== See also ==
- List of churches in Nord-Hålogaland
