= Reinøya, Troms =

Island in Norway

Reinøya (Norwegian); Ráidna (Northern Sami)
- Interactive map of: Reinøya (Norwegian); Ráidna (Northern Sami)

Geography
- Location: Troms, Norway
- Coordinates: 69.9056°N 19.6269°E
- Area: 147 km^{2} (57 sq mi)
- Length: 24 km (14.9 mi)
- Width: 10 km (6 mi)
- Coastline: 58 km (36 mi)
- Highest elevation: 872 m (2861 ft)
- Highest point: Sæterelvtinden

Administration
- Norway
- County: Troms
- Municipality: Karlsøy Municipality

Demographics
- Population: 300 (2008)
- Pop. density: 2/km^{2} (5/sq mi)

Reinøya (Norwegian) or Ráidna (Northern Sami) is an island in Karlsøy Municipality in Troms county, Norway. The 147-square-kilometre (57 sq mi) lies directly east of the large island of Ringvassøya, and the small island of Karlsøya lies to the north of the island. The Ullsfjorden lies along the eastern coast of the island.

The southern part of the island was part of Tromsø Municipality until 1 January 2008 when it was transferred to Karlsøy Municipality. The undersea Langsund Tunnel is approved to be built connecting the islands of Reinøya and Ringvassøya. Construction of this tunnel was scheduled to begin in 2019 or 2020, but there have been delays and construction work should begin around 2025.

== See also ==
- List of islands of Norway
