= Nordkvaløya =

Island in Troms, Norway

Nordkvaløya (Norwegian); Fálá (Northern Sami)
- Interactive map of: Nordkvaløya (Norwegian); Fálá (Northern Sami)

Geography
- Location: Troms, Norway
- Coordinates: 70.1777°N 19.1458°E
- Area: 84.4 km^{2} (32.6 sq mi)
- Length: 17 km (10.6 mi)
- Width: 10 km (6 mi)
- Coastline: 65 km (40.4 mi)
- Highest elevation: 736 m (2415 ft)
- Highest point: Storalangen

Administration
- Norway
- County: Troms
- Municipality: Karlsøy Municipality

Demographics
- Population: 3 (2017)
- Pop. density: 0.035/km^{2} (0.091/sq mi)

Nordkvaløya (Norwegian) or Fálá (Northern Sami) is an island in Karlsøy Municipality in Troms county, Norway. The island is situated north of the islands of Ringvassøya and west of Helgøya. The Norwegian Sea borders to the northwest. The 84.4-square-kilometre (32.6 sq mi) island of Nordkvaløya is very rugged and mountainous. The highest point is Storalangen at 736 m (2,415 ft). In 2017, the island had 3 residents.

== See also ==
- List of islands of Norway
