= Karlsøya, Troms =

Island in Troms, Norway

Karlsøya (Norwegian); Gálsá (Northern Sami)
- Interactive map of: Karlsøya (Norwegian); Gálsá (Northern Sami)

Geography
- Location: Troms, Norway
- Coordinates: 70.0065°N 19.9067°E
- Area: 7.91 km^{2} (3.05 sq mi)
- Length: 5 km (3.1 mi)
- Width: 2 km (1.2 mi)
- Highest elevation: 206 m (676 ft)
- Highest point: Veten

Administration
- Norway
- County: Troms
- Municipality: Karlsøy Municipality

Karlsøya (Norwegian) or Gálsá (Northern Sami) is an island in Karlsøy Municipality in Troms county, Norway. The 7.91-square-kilometre (3.05 sq mi) island of Karlsøya lies directly south of the island of Vannøya and northeast of the island of Reinøya, along the western side of the Ullsfjorden. The one village area on the island is known as Karlsøy and in 2001, it had a population of 70.

The island was the centre of the prestegjeld and municipality of Karlsøy for many hundreds of years (hence the name of the municipality). The island is still the location of the historic Karlsøy Church. The name Karlsøy comes from the man's name Kalfr which comes from Kalven, formerly meaning "the little island which lies next to the bigger one" (referring to Vannøya).

== See also ==
- List of islands of Norway
