= Kristina Torbergsen =

Norwegian politician

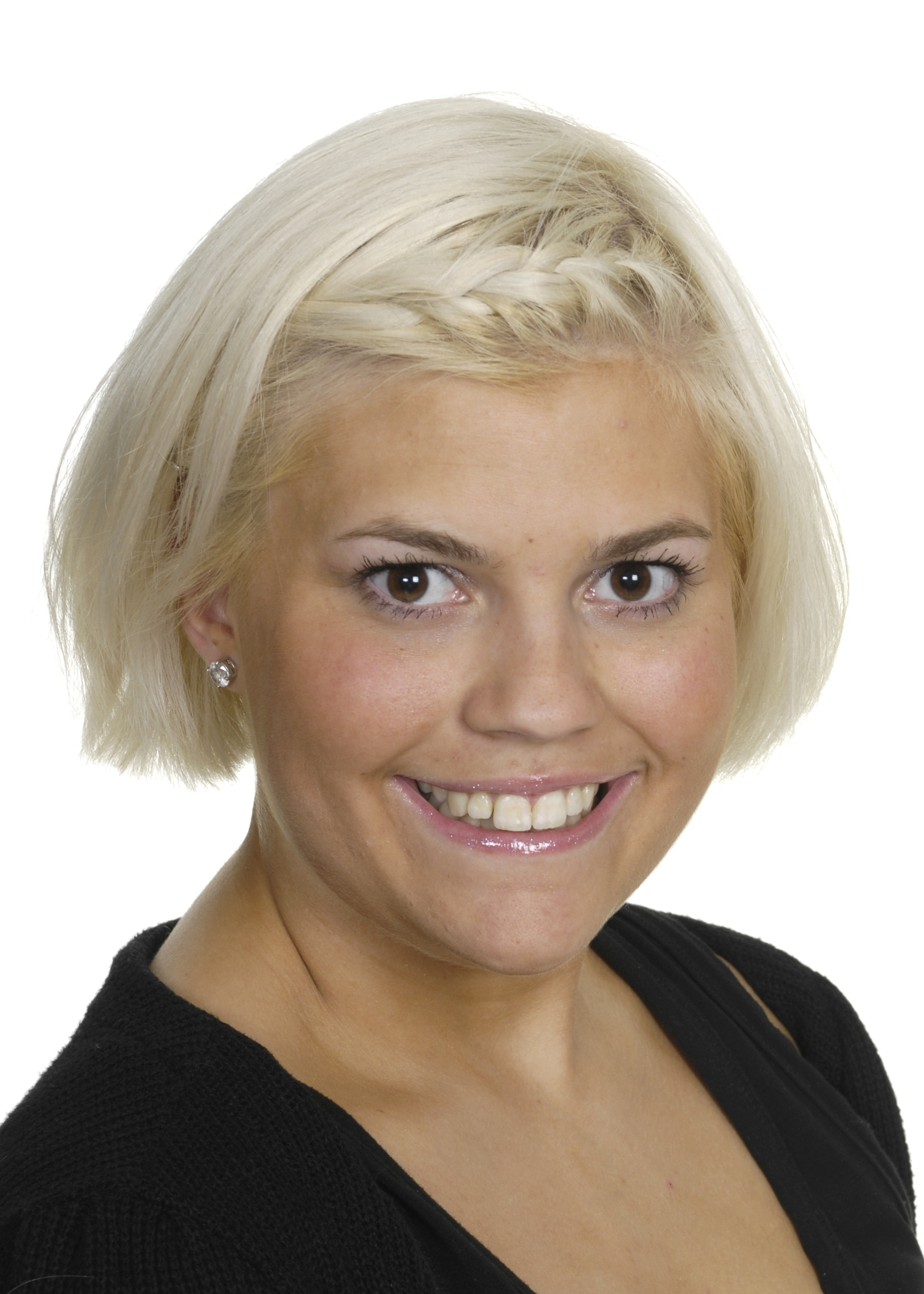

County Mayor of Troms
- Incumbent
- Assumed office 25 October 2023
- Deputy: Benjamin Nordberg Furuly
- Preceded by: Tarjei Jensen Bech (in Troms og Finnmark)

Chairwoman of the County Cabinet in Troms og Finnmark
- In office 1 August 2022 – 25 October 2023
- County Mayor: Tarjei Jensen Bech
- Preceded by: Bjørn Inge Mo
- Succeeded by: Position abolished

Deputy County Mayor of Troms
- In office 16 October 2007 – 18 October 2011
- County Mayor: Terje Olsen
- Preceded by: Ane-Marthe Aasen
- Succeeded by: Christine Bertheussen Killie

Personal details
- Born: 24 January 1987 (age 39) Skjervøy, Troms, Norway
- Party: Labour
- Education: University of Tromsø

Kristina Torbergsen (born 24 January 1987) is a Norwegian politician representing the Labour Party.

Torbergsen was elected to the county council for Troms in the 2007 local elections and served as Deputy County Mayor from 2007 to 2011. She is currently studying to become a teacher at the University of Tromsø. Torbergsen is a former leader of the Workers' Youth League in Troms.

Between 2021 and 2022, she served as state secretary to minister of education Tonje Brenna.

She was appointed chairwoman of the Troms og Finnmark county cabinet in August 2022 following the death of Bjørn Inge Mo.

She was the Labour Party's nominee for county mayor of Troms for the 2023 local elections. Following the election, she was elected county mayor, with the Conservatives' Benjamin Nordberg Furuly as deputy county mayor.
