= Troms County Municipality =

Regional governing administration for Troms county, Norway

Troms County Municipality Troms fylkeskommune Romssa fylkkasuohkan Tromssan fylkinkomuuni
- County
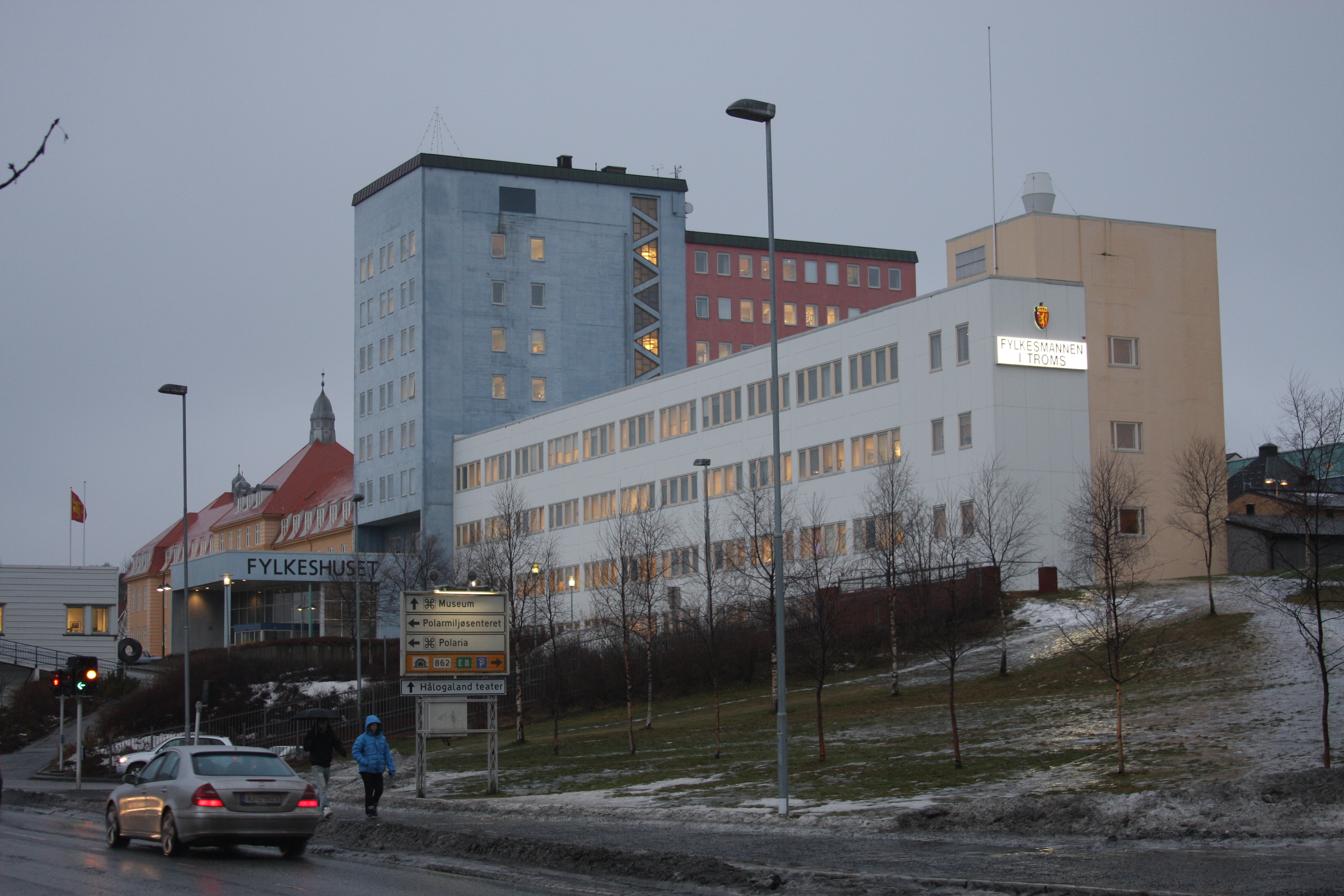
- Troms County Municipality administration building (2010)

- Coat of arms

- Location in Norway
- Coordinates: 69.6557°N 18.9585°E
- Country: Norway
- Established: 1 Jan 1838
- Disestablished: 2020-2024
- Re-established: 1 Jan 2024
- Administrative center: Tromsø

Government
  - County mayor: Kristina Torbergsen
- ISO 3166 code: NO-54
- Website: Official website

Troms County Municipality (Norwegian: Troms fylkeskommune, Kven: Tromssan fylkinkomuuni, Northern Sami: Romssa fylkkasuohkan) is the regional governing administration of Troms county in northern Norway. It was temporarily dissolved from 2020 to 2023 when Finnmark county was merged into Troms og Finnmark county, but that was undone effective 1 January 2024. It has its administration in the city of Tromsø. It consists of a 37-member county council led by a county mayor.

== County government ==
The county municipality's most important tasks include secondary education, recreation (sports and outdoor life), and cultural heritage. The county municipality is also responsible for all county roads (including ferry operations) and public transport (including school busses). The county municipality has further responsibility for regional land-use planning, business development, power production, and environmental management. The county also has responsibility for providing dental health services (in 2002, responsibility for hospitals and public medicine was transferred from the counties to the new regional health authorities).

=== County mayors ===
Since 1963, the county mayor (Norwegian: fylkesordfører) of Troms has been the political leader of the county and the chairperson of the county council. Prior to 1963, the County governor led the council which was made up of all of the mayors of the rural municipalities within the county. Here is a list of people who have held this position:

- 1963-1967: Bjarne Berg-Sæther (Ap)
- 1968-1971: Kåre Nordgård (Ap)
- 1972-1979: Alfred Sagelvmo (Ap)
- 1980-1983: Arne Nic. Sandnes (H)
- 1983-1987: William Engseth (Ap)
- 1987-1991: Kirsten Myklevoll (Ap)
- 1991-1991: Jan Henry T. Olsen (Ap)
- 1991-1992: Kirsten Myklevoll (Ap)
- 1993-1994: Roger Solheim (Ap)
- 1995-2007: Ronald Rindestu (Sp)
- 2007-2011: Terje Olsen (H)
- 2011-2019: Knut Werner Hansen (Ap)
- (2020-2023: none - Troms was part of the Troms og Finnmark County Municipality)
- 2024–present: Kristina Torbergsen (Ap)

=== County council ===
The county council (Norwegian: Fylkestinget) is made up of 37 representatives that are elected by direct election by all legal residents of the county every fourth year. The council is the legislative body for the county. The county council typically meets about six times a year. Council members are divided into standing committees and an executive committee (fylkesutvalg), which meet considerably more often. Both the council and executive committee (with at least 5 members) are led by the county mayor (Norwegian: fylkesordfører). The executive committee carries out the executive funitons of the county under the direction of the whole council. The tables below show the current and historical composition of the council by political party.

Troms fylkesting 2023–2027
Party name (in Norwegian)	Number of representatives
Labour Party (Arbeiderpartiet)	9
Progress Party (Fremskrittspartiet)	6
Green Party (Miljøpartiet De Grønne)	1
Conservative Party (Høyre)	7
Industry and Business Party (Industri‑ og Næringspartiet)	2
Christian Democratic Party (Kristelig Folkeparti)	1
Nordkalottfolket Party (Nordkalottfolket)	1
Red Party (Rødt)	2
Centre Party (Senterpartiet)	3
Socialist Left Party (Sosialistisk Venstreparti)	4
Liberal Party (Venstre)	1
Total number of members:	37
Note: From 2020-2024, Troms county was part of Troms og Finnmark county.

Troms fylkesting 2015–2019
Party name (in Norwegian)	Number of representatives
Labour Party (Arbeiderpartiet)	12
Progress Party (Fremskrittspartiet)	5
Green Party (Miljøpartiet De Grønne)	2
Conservative Party (Høyre)	6
Christian Democratic Party (Kristelig Folkeparti)	2
Red Party (Rødt)	2
Centre Party (Senterpartiet)	4
Socialist Left Party (Sosialistisk Venstreparti)	2
Liberal Party (Venstre)	2
Total number of members:	37
Note: From 2020-2024, Troms county was part of Troms og Finnmark county.

Troms fylkesting 2011–2015
Party name (in Norwegian)	Number of representatives
Labour Party (Arbeiderpartiet)	12
Progress Party (Fremskrittspartiet)	6
Conservative Party (Høyre)	9
Christian Democratic Party (Kristelig Folkeparti)	1
Coastal Party (Kystpartiet)	1
Red Party (Rødt)	1
Centre Party (Senterpartiet)	3
Socialist Left Party (Sosialistisk Venstreparti)	2
Liberal Party (Venstre)	2
Total number of members:	37

Troms fylkesting 2007–2011
Party name (in Norwegian)	Number of representatives
Labour Party (Arbeiderpartiet)	12
Progress Party (Fremskrittspartiet)	8
Conservative Party (Høyre)	5
Christian Democratic Party (Kristelig Folkeparti)	2
Coastal Party (Kystpartiet)	1
Red Party (Rødt)	1
Centre Party (Senterpartiet)	4
Socialist Left Party (Sosialistisk Venstreparti)	3
Liberal Party (Venstre)	1
Total number of members:	37

Troms fylkesting 2003–2007
Party name (in Norwegian)	Number of representatives
Labour Party (Arbeiderpartiet)	10
Progress Party (Fremskrittspartiet)	6
Conservative Party (Høyre)	4
Christian Democratic Party (Kristelig Folkeparti)	3
Coastal Party (Kystpartiet)	1
Red Party (Rødt)	1
Centre Party (Senterpartiet)	5
Socialist Left Party (Sosialistisk Venstreparti)	6
Liberal Party (Venstre)	1
Total number of members:	37

Troms fylkesting 1999–2003
Party name (in Norwegian)	Number of representatives
Labour Party (Arbeiderpartiet)	15
Progress Party (Fremskrittspartiet)	5
Conservative Party (Høyre)	7
Christian Democratic Party (Kristelig Folkeparti)	4
Red Party (Rødt)	1
Centre Party (Senterpartiet)	7
Socialist Left Party (Sosialistisk Venstreparti)	4
Liberal Party (Venstre)	2
Total number of members:	45

Troms fylkesting 1995–1999
Party name (in Norwegian)	Number of representatives
Labour Party (Arbeiderpartiet)	16
Progress Party (Fremskrittspartiet)	3
Conservative Party (Høyre)	8
Christian Democratic Party (Kristelig Folkeparti)	3
Red Party (Rødt)	2
Centre Party (Senterpartiet)	7
Socialist Left Party (Sosialistisk Venstreparti)	3
Liberal Party (Venstre)	2
Solidarity (Solidaritet)	1
Total number of members:	45

Troms fylkesting 1991–1995
Party name (in Norwegian)	Number of representatives
Labour Party (Arbeiderpartiet)	16
Progress Party (Fremskrittspartiet)	2
Conservative Party (Høyre)	10
Christian Democratic Party (Kristelig Folkeparti)	3
Centre Party (Senterpartiet)	6
Socialist Left Party (Sosialistisk Venstreparti)	7
Liberal Party (Venstre)	1
Total number of members:	45

Troms fylkesting 1987–1991
Party name (in Norwegian)	Number of representatives
Labour Party (Arbeiderpartiet)	19
Progress Party (Fremskrittspartiet)	3
Conservative Party (Høyre)	12
Christian Democratic Party (Kristelig Folkeparti)	3
Red Party (Rødt)	1
Centre Party (Senterpartiet)	2
Socialist Left Party (Sosialistisk Venstreparti)	3
Liberal Party (Venstre)	2
Total number of members:	45

Troms fylkesting 1983–1987
Party name (in Norwegian)	Number of representatives
Labour Party (Arbeiderpartiet)	19
Progress Party (Fremskrittspartiet)	2
Conservative Party (Høyre)	12
Christian Democratic Party (Kristelig Folkeparti)	3
Red Party (Rødt)	1
Centre Party (Senterpartiet)	3
Socialist Left Party (Sosialistisk Venstreparti)	3
Liberal Party (Venstre)	2
Total number of members:	45

Troms fylkesting 1979–1983
Party name (in Norwegian)	Number of representatives
Labour Party (Arbeiderpartiet)	17
Conservative Party (Høyre)	13
Christian Democratic Party (Kristelig Folkeparti)	4
Red Party (Rødt)	1
Centre Party (Senterpartiet)	4
Socialist Left Party (Sosialistisk Venstreparti)	3
Liberal Party (Venstre)	3
Total number of members:	45

Troms fylkesting 1975–1979
Party name (in Norwegian)	Number of representatives
Labour Party (Arbeiderpartiet)	18
Conservative Party (Høyre)	9
Christian Democratic Party (Kristelig Folkeparti)	6
New People's Party (Nye Folkepartiet)	1
Centre Party (Senterpartiet)	6
Socialist Left Party (Sosialistisk Venstreparti)	3
Liberal Party (Venstre)	2
Total number of members:	45
Note: Prior to this election, the county councils were not directly elected. Instead, members were chosen by each municipal council within the county - oftentimes it was the municipal mayors who were selected to be on the county council.
