= Ronald Rindestu =

Norwegian politician

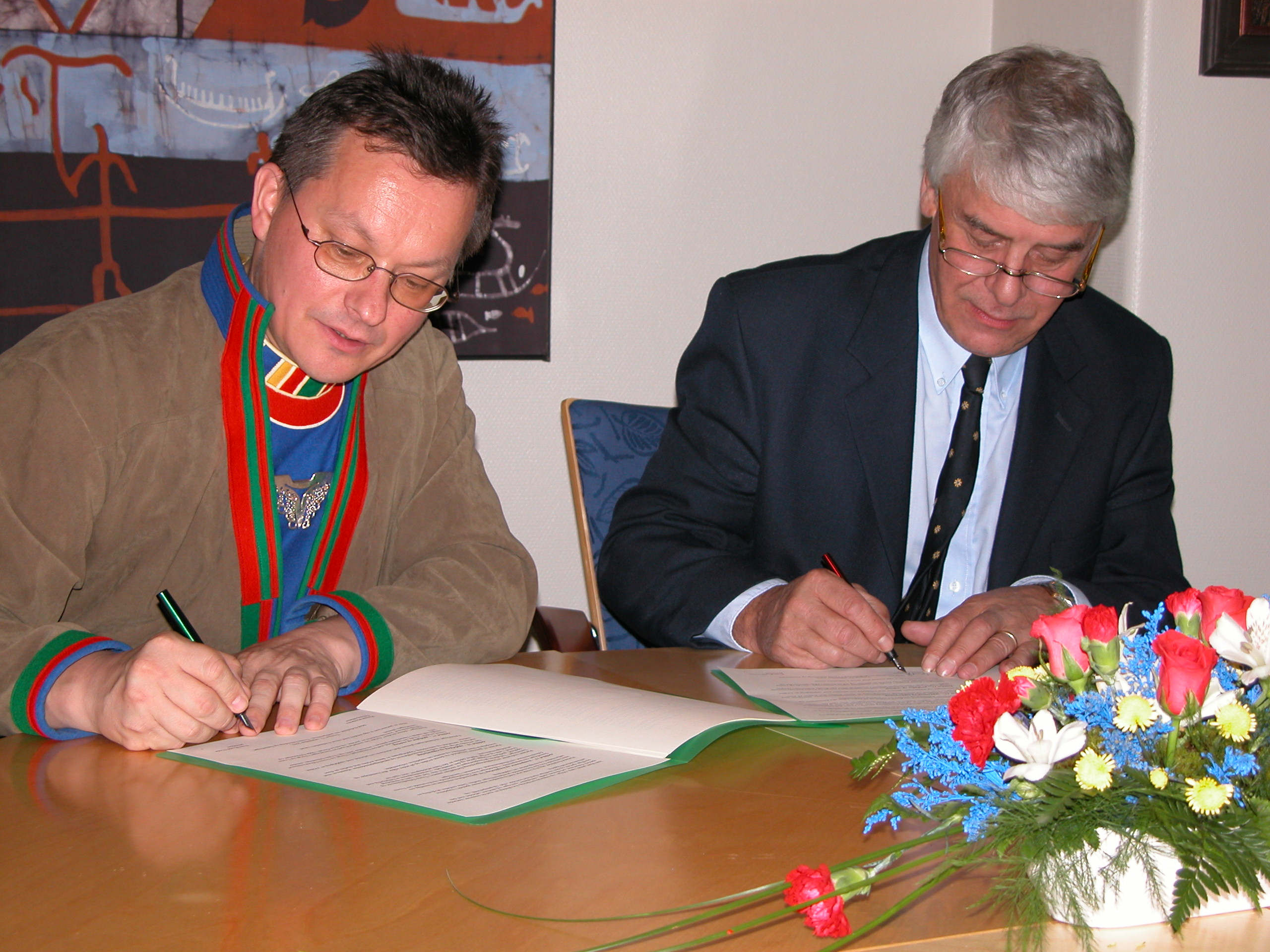
Rindestu (right) and Sven-Roald Nystø, President of the Sami Parliament of Norway, signing a cooperation agreement in 2002

Ronald Rindestu (5 June 1942 – 16 February 2012) was a Norwegian politician for the Centre Party.

He was elected to Troms county council in 1987, and was re-elected in 1991 and 1995. He then became mayor (fylkesordfører) of Troms, which he remained until 2007. He died in 2011.

Political offices
Preceded by	County mayor of Troms; 1995–2007	Succeeded by Terje Olsen
