= Wenneberg =

Wenneberg is a surname. Notable people with the surname include:

- Hans Biørn Wenneberg (1804–1878), Norwegian politician
- Signe Wenneberg (born 1968), Danish politician

== See also ==
- Wennberg
