= Knut Werner Hansen =

Norwegian politician (born 1951)

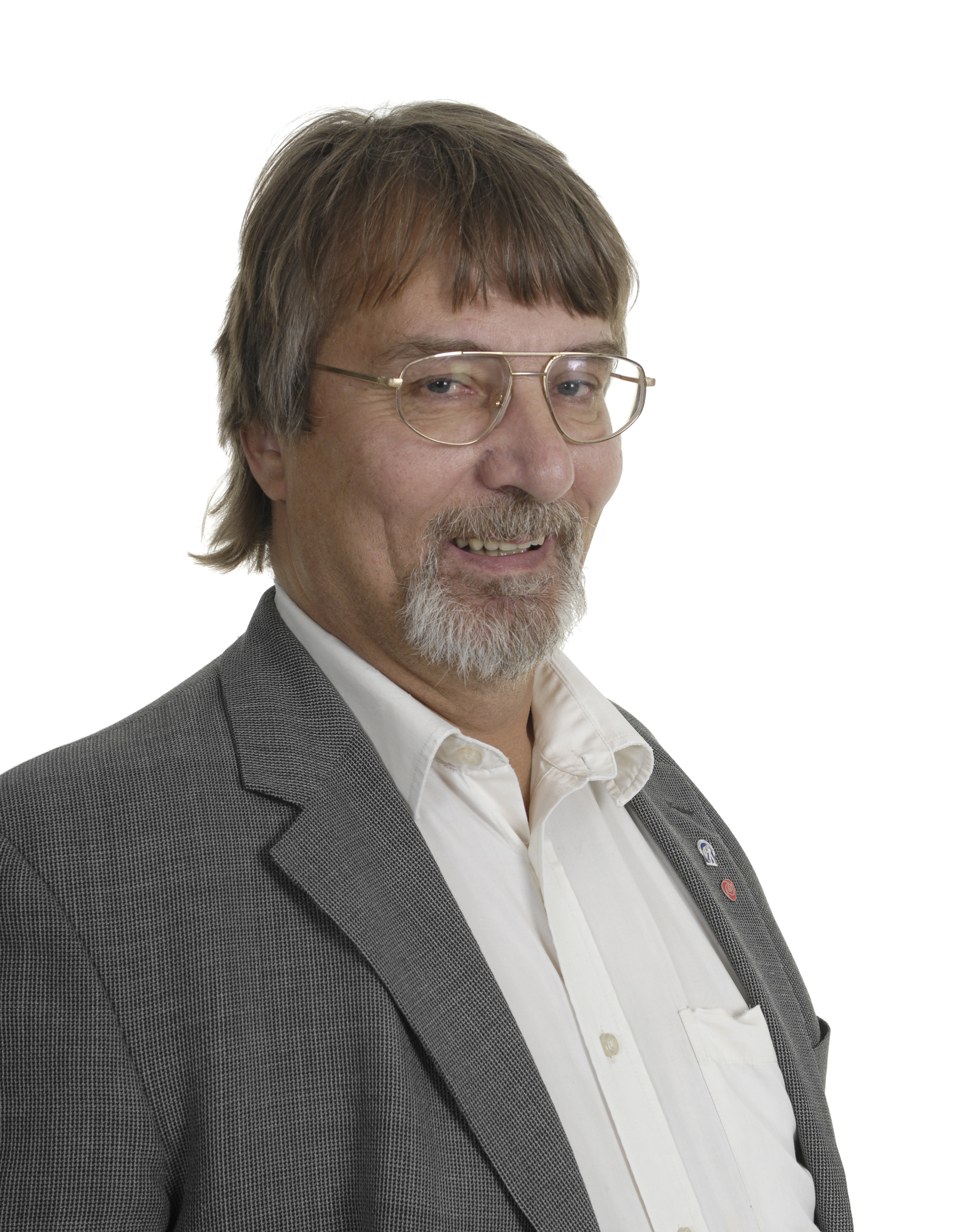

County Mayor of Troms
- In office 18 October 2011 – 28 October 2019
- Deputy: Christine Bertheussen Killie; Irene Dahl
- Cabinet Chair: Pia Svensgaard; Line Fusdahl; Cecilie Myrseth; Willy Ørnebakk
- Preceded by: Terje Olsen
- Succeeded by: Ivar B. Prestbakmo (Troms og Finnmark county)

Personal details
- Born: 22 November 1951 (age 73)
- Political party: Labour

Knut Werner Hansen (born 22 November 1951) is a Norwegian politician for the Labour Party.

He served as a deputy representative to the Storting from Troms between 1997 and 2009. In total he met during 1 year and 46 days of parliamentary session.

He was born in Skjervøy Municipality. He was a member of the municipal council of Karlsøy Municipality. Following the 2011 local elections, he was elected county mayor of Troms and thereby also the Troms County Municipality, with the Conservatives' Christine Bertheussen Killie as deputy. He was re-elected following the 2015 local elections, this time with the Liberals' Irene Dahl as deputy. Following the decision to merge Troms and Finnmark counties and the 2019 local elections, Ivar B. Prestbakmo was elected as county mayor of the new county.

Political offices
| Preceded by Terje Olsen | County Mayor of Troms; 2011–2019 | Position abolished |
