= Wennberg =

Wennberg is a Swedish surname. Notable people with the surname include:

- Alexander Wennberg (born 1994), Swedish ice hockey player
- Erik Wennberg (1910–1982), Swedish middle-distance runner
- John Wennberg (born 1934), American medical scientist
- Lotten Wennberg (1815–1864), Swedish philanthropist
- Paul Wennberg, American atmospheric scientist
- Samuel Georg Simeon Wennberg (1836–1908), Norwegian politician

== See also ==
- Wennerberg
