= Terje Olsen (politician) =

Norwegian politician (born 1951)

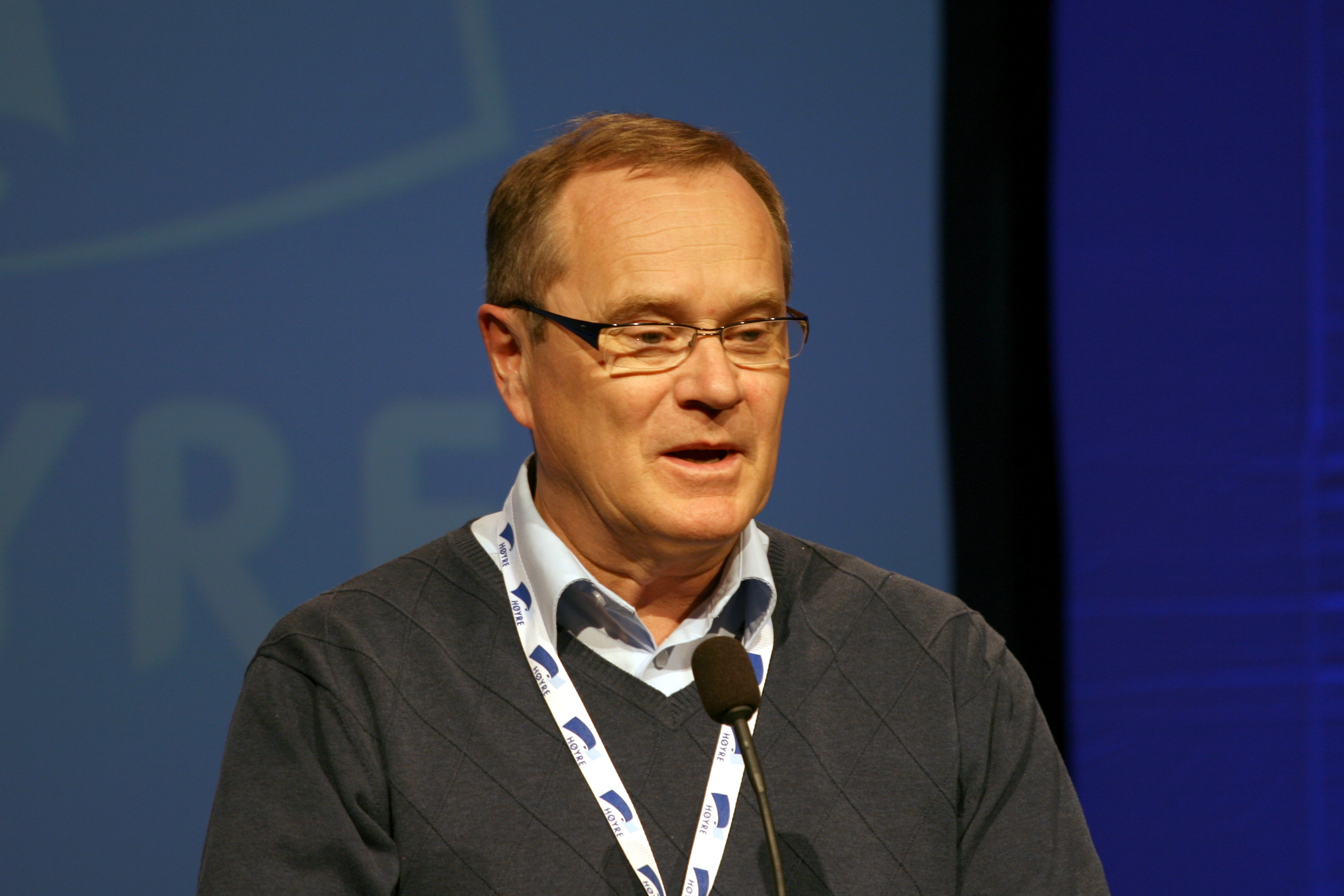
Terje Olsen.

Terje Olsen (born 4 January 1951) is a Norwegian politician for the Conservative Party.

He served as a deputy representative to the Parliament of Norway from Troms during the terms 1993–1997 and 2009–2013. He was a member of the municipal council of Nordreisa Municipality, and from 2007 to 2011 county mayor of Troms.

He has also been a board member of Tromsø University College.

Political offices
| Preceded by Ronald Rindestu | County mayor of Troms; 2007–2011 | Succeeded by Knut Werner Hansen |
