= Wennerberg =

Wennerberg is a Swedish surname that may refer to

- Eric Wennerberg (1917–2001), Swedish bobsledder
- Gunnar Wennerberg (1817–1901), Swedish poet, composer and politician
- Mattias Wennerberg (born 1981), Swedish ice hockey forward
- Sara Wennerberg-Reuter (1875–1959), Swedish organist and composer

== See also ==
- Wennberg
