= Troms og Finnmark =

County of Norway (2020–2024)

Troms og Finnmark County Troms og Finnmark fylke Romssa ja Finnmárkku fylka (Northern Sami) Tromssan ja Finmarkun fylkki (Kven)
- Former County
- Flag Coat of arms

- Location within Troms og Finnmark Location within Norway
- Coordinates: 69.8178°N 18.7819°E
- Country: Norway
- County: Troms og Finnmark
- District: Northern Norway
- Established: 1 January 2020
  - Preceded by: Finnmark and Troms counties
- Disestablished: 1 January 2024
  - Succeeded by: Finnmark and Troms counties
- Administrative centre: Tromsø

Government
  - Body: Troms og Finnmark County Municipality
  - Governor (2019): Elisabeth Aspaker (H)
  - County mayor (2019): Ivar B. Prestbakmo (Sp)

Area (upon dissolution)
  - Total: 74,831 km^{2} (28,892 sq mi)
  - Land: 70,925 km^{2} (27,384 sq mi)
  - Water: 3,908 km^{2} (1,509 sq mi) 5.2%
  - Rank: #1 in Norway

Population (2021)
  - Total: 242,168
  - Rank: #10 in Norway
  - Density: 3.4/km^{2} (8.8/sq mi)
  - Change (10 years): ▲ +4.2%
- Demonym: Tromsing or Finnmarking

Official language
  - Norwegian form: Neutral
- Time zone: UTC+01:00 (CET)
  - Summer (DST): UTC+02:00 (CEST)
- ISO 3166 code: NO-54
- Website: Official website

Troms og Finnmark (Norwegian: [trʊms ɔ ˈfɪ̀nːmɑrk]; Northern Sami: Romsa ja Finnmárku [ˈromːsa ja ˈfinːmaːrku]; Kven: Tromssa ja Finmarkku; Finnish: Tromssa ja Finnmark) was a county in northern Norway that existed from 2020 to 2023. The county was established on 1 January 2020 as the result of a regional reform. It was the largest county by area in Norway, encompassing about 75,000 square kilometres (29,000 mi^{2}), and was formed by the merger of the former Finnmark and Troms counties in addition to Tjeldsund Municipality from Nordland county.

The administrative centre of the county was split between two towns. The political and administrative offices were based in the city of Tromsø (the seat of the old Troms county). The county governor was based in the town of Vadsø (the seat of the old Finnmark county). The two towns are about 800 kilometres (500 mi) apart, approximately a 10-hour drive by car.

On 15 June 2022, the parliament decided to split the county back into Finnmark and Troms beginning on 1 January 2024, with Tjeldsund Municipality assigned to Troms county (Tjeldsund had been part of Nordland county before 2020).

== Geography ==
Troms og Finnmark was the northernmost and easternmost county in Norway (Svalbard, an unincorporated area, is not considered a county). By area, it was Norway's largest county, and also one of the least populated of all Norwegian counties.

== History ==
The merger of Troms County and Finnmark County was not popular, especially in the old Finnmark county. A county-wide non-binding referendum was held in which it was opposed by about 87% of Finnmark residents who voted, but the Storting did not reverse its decision to merge the county. Some political parties campaigned to reverse the merger in the parliamentary term that starts in September 2021. On 28 October 2021, Minister of Local Government Bjørn Arild Gram sent a letter to the county confirming that it will be demerged.

On 17 March 2021, organisations reported that the county council sent an application to Norway's government to have the county split back up.

On 28 October 2021, the Norwegian government confirmed that Troms and Finnmark would become two separate counties again.

== Government ==
A county (fylke) is the chief local administrative area in Norway. The whole country is divided into 11 counties. A county is also an election area, with popular votes taking place every 4 years.

In Troms og Finnmark, the government of the county was the Troms og Finnmark County Municipality. It included 57 members who were elected to form a county council (Fylkesting). Heading the Fylkesting was the county mayor (fylkesordførar), Ivar B. Prestbakmo (as of 2021).

The county also had a fylkesrådsleder, the top executive of the county's administration, Bjørn Inge Mo.

The county also had a County Governor (statsforvalter) who was the representative of the King and Government of Norway. Elisabeth Aspaker was the County Governor of Troms og Finnmark.

On 1 January 2019, Elisabeth Aspaker was appointed as the County Governor of Troms og Finnmark.

The municipalities in Troms og Finnmark were divided among several district courts (tingrett): Alta District Court, Hammerfest District Court, Indre Finnmark District Court, Nord-Troms District Court, Senja District Court, Trondenes District Court, and Øst-Finnmark District Court. All of these courts were subordinate to the Hålogaland Court of Appeal district based in Tromsø.

== Municipalities ==
Municipalities of Troms

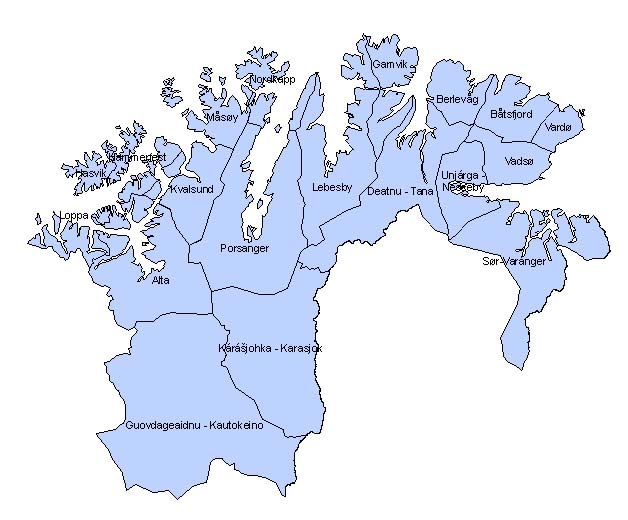
Municipalities of Finnmark

Troms og Finnmark County had a total of 39 municipalities:

Municipal Number	Name	Adm. Centre	Location in the county	Established	Old Municipal No. (before 2020)	Former County (before 2020)
5401	Tromsø	Tromsø		1 Jan 1838	1902 Tromsø	Troms
5402	Harstad	Harstad		1 Jan 1904	1903 Harstad; Bjarkøy	Troms
5403	Alta	Alta		1 Jan 1863	2012 Alta	Finnmark
5404	Vardø	Vardø		1 Jan 1838	2002 Vardø	Finnmark
5405	Vadsø	Vadsø		1 Jan 1838	2003 Vadsø	Finnmark
5406	Hammerfest	Hammerfest		1 Jan 1838	2004 Hammerfest; 2017 Kvalsund	Finnmark
5411	Kvæfjord	Borkenes		1 Jan 1838	1911 Kvæfjord	Troms
5412	Tjeldsund	Evenskjer		1 Jan 1909	1852 Tjeldsund	Nordland
5412	Tjeldsund	Evenskjer		1 Jan 1909	1913 Skånland	Troms
5413	Ibestad	Hamnvik		1 Jan 1838	1917 Ibestad	Troms
5414	Gratangen	Årstein		1 July 1926	1919 Gratangen	Troms
5415	Lavangen	Tennevoll		1 Jan 1907	1920 Lavangen	Troms
5416	Bardu	Setermoen		1 Jan 1854	1922 Bardu	Troms
5417	Salangen	Sjøvegan		1 Jan 1871	1923 Salangen	Troms
5418	Målselv	Moen		1 Jan 1848	1924 Målselv	Troms
5419	Sørreisa	Sørreisa		1 Sep 1886	1925 Sørreisa	Troms
5420	Dyrøy	Brøstadbotn		1 Sep 1886	1926 Dyrøy	Troms
5421	Senja	Finnsnes		1 Jan 2020	1927 Tranøy; 1928 Torsken; 1929 Berg; 1931 Lenvik	Troms
5422	Balsfjord	Storsteinnes		1 Jan 1860	1933 Balsfjord	Troms
5423	Karlsøy	Hansnes		1 Jan 1838	1936 Karlsøy	Troms
5424	Lyngen	Lyngseidet		1 Jan 1838	1938 Lyngen	Troms
5425	Storfjord	Hatteng		1 Jan 1929	1939 Storfjord	Troms
5426	Kåfjord	Olderdalen		1 Jan 1929	1940 Kåfjord	Troms
5427	Skjervøy	Skjervøy		1 Jan 1838	1941 Skjervøy	Troms
5428	Nordreisa	Storslett		1 Jan 1886	1942 Nordreisa	Troms
5429	Kvænangen	Burfjord		1 Jan 1863	1943 Kvænangen	Troms
5430	Kautokeino	Kautokeino		1 Jan 1851	2011 Kautokeino	Finnmark
5432	Loppa	Øksfjord		1 Jan 1838	2014 Loppa	Finnmark
5433	Hasvik	Breivikbotn		1 Jan 1858	2015 Hasvik	Finnmark
5434	Måsøy	Havøysund		1 Jan 1838	2018 Måsøy	Finnmark
5435	Nordkapp	Honningsvåg		1 July 1861	2019 Nordkapp	Finnmark
5436	Porsanger	Lakselv		1 Jan 1838	2020 Porsanger	Finnmark
5437	Karasjok	Karasjok		1 Jan 1866	2021 Karasjok	Finnmark
5438	Lebesby	Kjøllefjord		1 Jan 1838	2022 Lebesby	Finnmark
5439	Gamvik	Mehamn		1 Jan 1914	2023 Gamvik	Finnmark
5440	Berlevåg	Berlevåg		1 Jan 1914	2024 Berlevåg	Finnmark
5441	Tana	Tana bru		1 Jan 1864	2025 Tana	Finnmark
5442	Nesseby	Varangerbotn		1 Jan 1839	2027 Nesseby	Finnmark
5443	Båtsfjord	Båtsfjord		1 Jan 1839	2028 Båtsfjord	Finnmark
5444	Sør-Varanger	Kirkenes		1 Jul 1858	2030 Sør-Varanger	Finnmark
