= Samuel Georg Simeon Wennberg =

Norwegian politician

Samuel Georg Simeon Wennberg (3 October 1836, Trondheim – 19 October 1908, Balsfjord) was a Norwegian politician for the Liberal Party.

He was elected to the Norwegian Parliament in 1877, representing the constituency of Tromsø Amt. He worked as a merchant there, later police sergeant. He was re-elected in 1880 and 1883.
