= Troms og Finnmark County Municipality =

Troms og Finnmark County Municipality Troms og Finnmark fylkeskommune (Norwegian) Romssa ja Finnmarkku fylkkagielda (Northern Sami) Tromssan ja Finmarkun fylkinkomuuni (Kven)
- Former county
- Coat of arms

- Location in Norway
- Country: Norway
- Administrative center: Tromsø, Vadsø

Government
  - County mayor: Ivar Prestbakkmo
  - Chairman of Cabinet: Bjørn Inge Mo
- ISO 3166 code: NO-54
- Website: www.tffk.no

Troms og Finnmark County Council

Troms og Finnmark County Municipality (Troms og Finnmark fylkeskommune (Norwegian), Romssa ja Finnmarkku fylkkagielda (Northern Sami), or Tromssan ja Finmarkun fylkinkomuuni (Kven)) was the regional governing administration of Troms og Finnmark county in northern Norway from 2020 to 2024. It had its administration in the city of Tromsø. It consisted of a 57-member county council and a 5-member county cabinet.

== County government ==
The Troms og Finnmark county council (Norwegian: Fylkestinget) was made up of 57 representatives that were to be elected every four years. The council essentially acted as a Parliament or legislative body for the county. The council was led by a county mayor (Norwegian: Fylkesordfører), and the council elected five members to be in the county cabinet (Norwegian: Fylkesrådet) which carried out the executive functions of the county.

=== County council ===
The party breakdown of the council was as follows:

Troms og Finnmark fylkesting 2020–2024
Party name (in Norwegian)	Number of representatives
Labour Party (Arbeiderpartiet)	14
Progress Party (Fremskrittspartiet)	6
Green Party (Miljøpartiet De Grønne)	3
Conservative Party (Høyre)	8
Christian Democratic Party (Kristelig Folkeparti)	2
Red Party (Rødt)	2
Centre Party (Senterpartiet)	14
Socialist Left Party (Sosialistisk Venstreparti)	6
Liberal Party (Venstre)	1
People of the Cap of the North (Nordkalottfolket)	1
Total number of members:	57
