= Bjørn Inge Mo =

Norwegian politician (1968–2022)

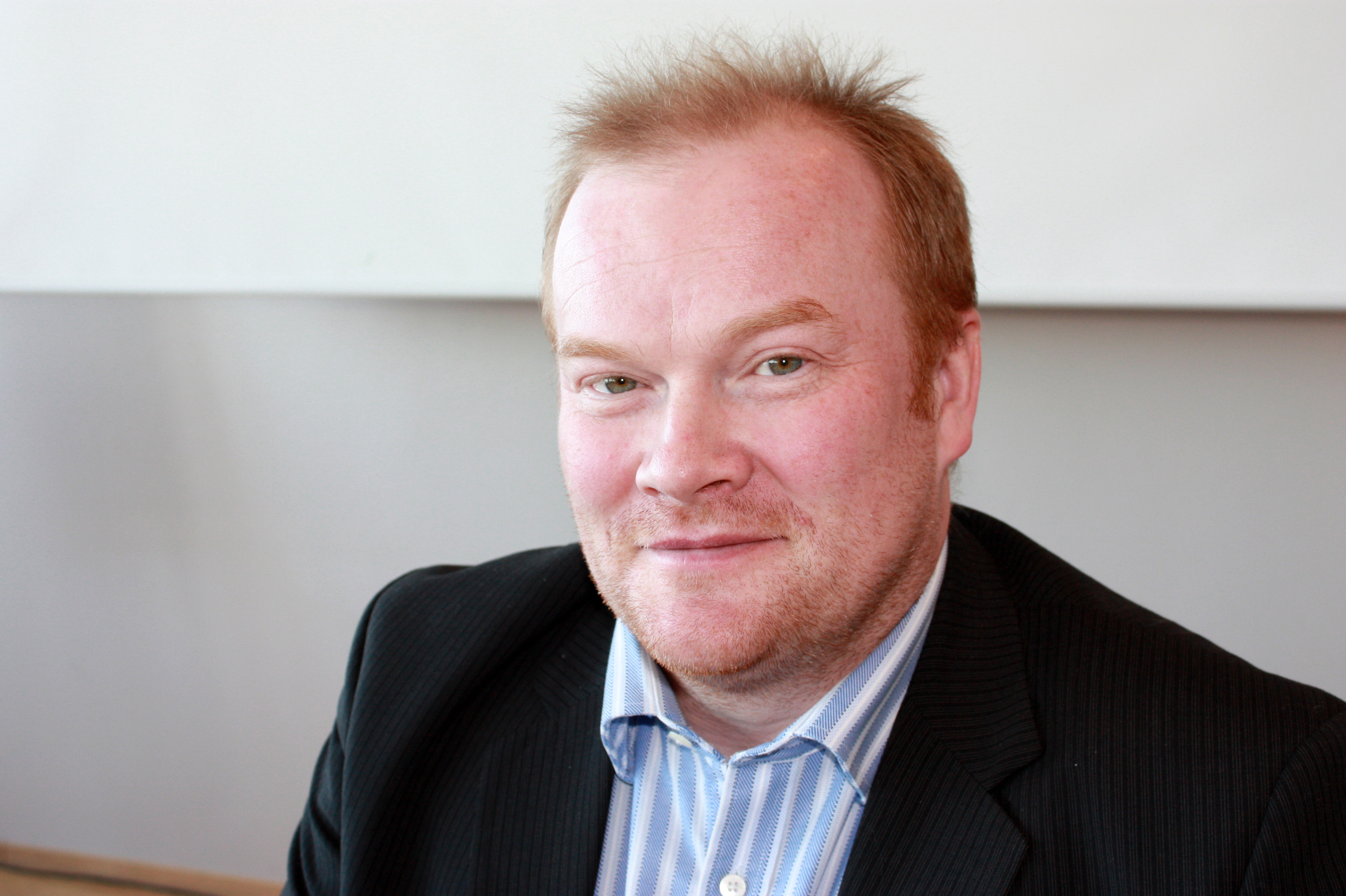
- Mo in 2009

Member of the Sámi Parliament of Norway
- In office 2017–2020
- Constituency: Gáisi valgkrets

Mayor of Kåfjord
- In office 2003–2015
- Preceded by: Kristin Vatnelid Johansen
- Succeeded by: Svein O. Leiros

Personal details
- Born: 16 March 1968 Oslo, Norway
- Died: 10 July 2022 (aged 54) Kåfjord, Norway
- Party: Ap

Bjørn Inge Mo (16 March 1968 – 10 July 2022) was a Norwegian politician. A member of the Labour Party, he was mayor of Kåfjord Municipality from 2003 to 2015 and served in the Sámi Parliament of Norway from 2017 to 2020.

Mo died on 10 July 2022 at the age of 54.
