= Troms =

County in Northern Norway

Troms County Troms fylke Romssa fylka Tromssan fylkki
- County
- Tromsø amt (historic name)
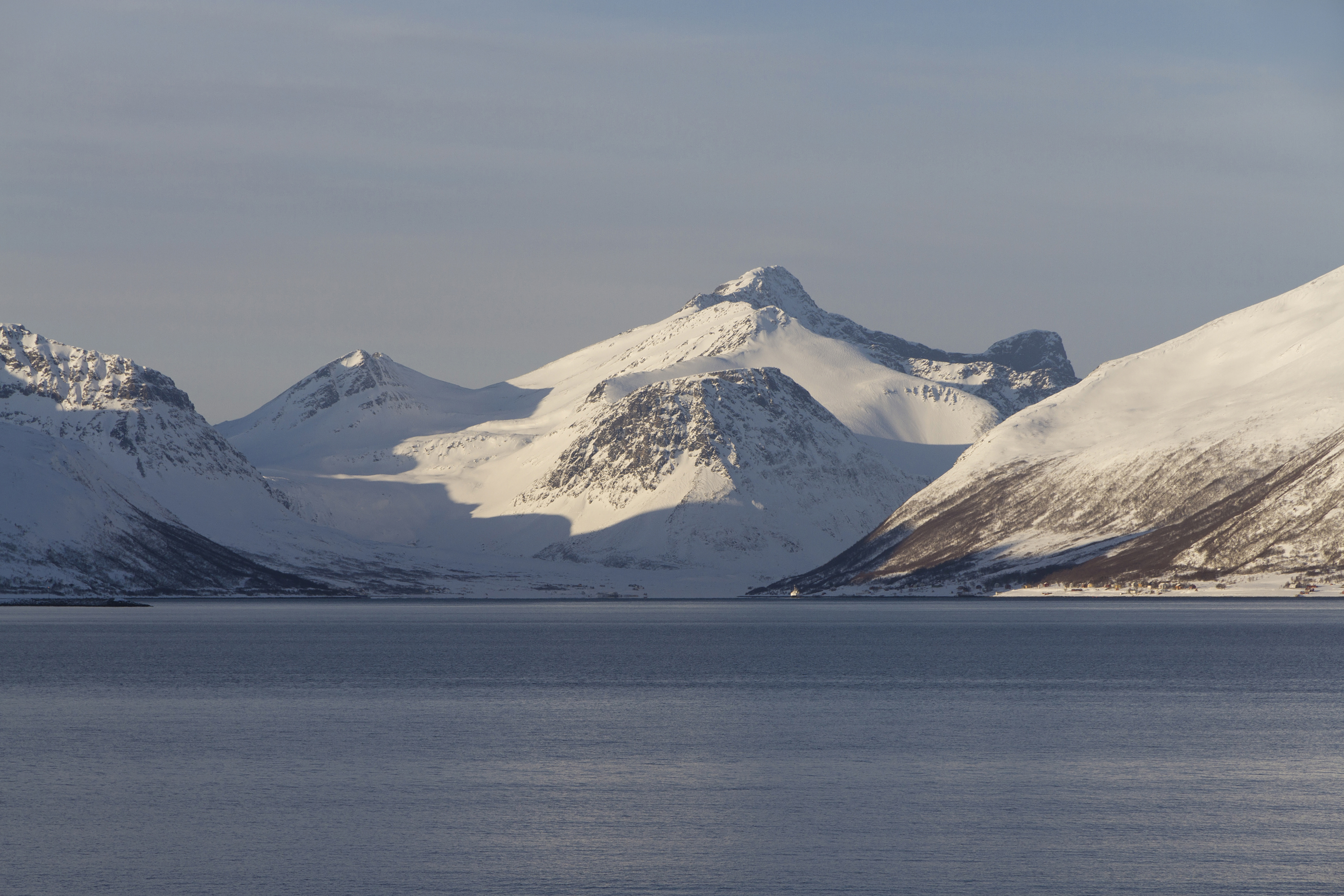
- Arnøyhøgda, Laukslettinden, Tjuvtinden and Rødhetta as seen over Skattørsundet in March 2012

- Flag Coat of arms

- Troms within Norway
- Coordinates: 69.8178°N 18.7819°E
- Country: Norway
- County: Troms
- District: Northern Norway
- Established: 1866
  - Preceded by: Finnmarkens amt
- Disestablished: 1 January 2020
  - Succeeded by: Troms og Finnmark
- Re-established: 1 January 2024
  - Preceded by: Troms og Finnmark
- Administrative centre: Tromsø

Government
  - Body: Troms County Municipality
  - Governor (2017): Elisabeth Aspaker (H)
  - County mayor (2023): Kristina Torbergsen (Ap)

Area
  - Total: 25,877 km^{2} (9,991 sq mi)
  - Land: 24,884 km^{2} (9,608 sq mi)
  - Water: 993 km^{2} (383 sq mi) 3.8%
  - Rank: #4 in Norway

Population (30 September 2019)
  - Total: 166,375
  - Rank: #15 in Norway
  - Density: 6/km^{2} (16/sq mi)
  - Change (10 years): ▲ +2%

Official language
  - Norwegian form: Neutral
- Time zone: UTC+01:00 (CET)
  - Summer (DST): UTC+02:00 (CEST)
- ISO 3166 code: NO-55
- Income (per capita): 133,300 kr (2001)
- GDP (per capita): 211,955 kr (2001)
- GDP national rank: #15 in Norway (2.11% of country)
- Website: Official website

Troms (Norwegian: [trʊms]; Northern Sami: Romsa; Kven: Tromssa; Finnish: Tromssa) is a county in northern Norway. It borders Finnmark county to the northeast and Nordland county in the southwest. Norrbotten Län in Sweden is located to the south and further southeast is a shorter border with Lapland Province in Finland. To the west is the Norwegian Sea (Atlantic Ocean). The county had a population of 169,610 in 2024.

The entire county, which was established in 1866, is located north of the Arctic Circle. The Troms County Municipality is the governing body for the county, elected by the people of Troms, while the Troms county governor is a representative of the King and Government of Norway.

From January 2020 to December 2023, Troms was merged with the neighboring Finnmark county to create the new Troms og Finnmark county. This merger was reversed by the government resulting from the 2021 Norwegian parliamentary election.

== General information ==
=== Name ===
Until 1919, the county was known as Tromsø amt. In July 2006, the Northern Sami name for the county, Romsa, was granted official status along with Troms.

The county, and the city of Tromsø, is named after the island Tromsøya on which it is located, from the Old Norse Trums. Several theories exist as to the etymology of Troms. One theory holds "Troms-" to derive from the old (uncompounded) name of the island (Old Norse: Trums). Several islands and rivers in Norway have the name Tromsa, and the names of these are probably derived from the word straumr which means "(strong) stream". The original form must then have been Strums, for the missing s see Indo-European s-mobile.

Another theory holds that Tromsøya was originally called Lille Tromsøya (Little Tromsøya), because of its proximity to the much bigger island today called Kvaløya, that according to this theory was earlier called "Store Tromsøya" due to a characteristic mountain known as Tromma (the Drum). The mountain's name in Sámi, Rumbbučohkka, is identical in meaning, and it is said to have been a sacred mountain for the Sámi in pre-Christian times.

The Sámi name of the island, Romsa, is assumed to be a loan from Norse – but according to the phonetical rules of the Sami language the frontal t has disappeared from the name. An alternative form – Tromsa – is in informal use. There is a theory that holds the Norwegian name of Tromsø derives from the Sámi name, though this theory lacks an explanation for the meaning of Romsa. A common misunderstanding is that Tromsø's Sámi name is Romssa with a double "s". This is the accusative and genitive form of the noun used when, for example, writing "Tromsø Municipality" (Romssa Suohkan).

=== Coat of arms ===
The coat of arms of Troms was made by Hallvard Trætteberg (1898–1987) and adopted by royal resolution in January 1960. The official blazon in Norwegian ("På rød bunn en gull griff") translates to "On a field Gules a griffin [segreant] Or." Trætteberg chose to have the griffin as charge because that animal was the symbol of the mighty clan of Bjarne Erlingsson on Bjarkøy in the 13th century.

== Geography ==
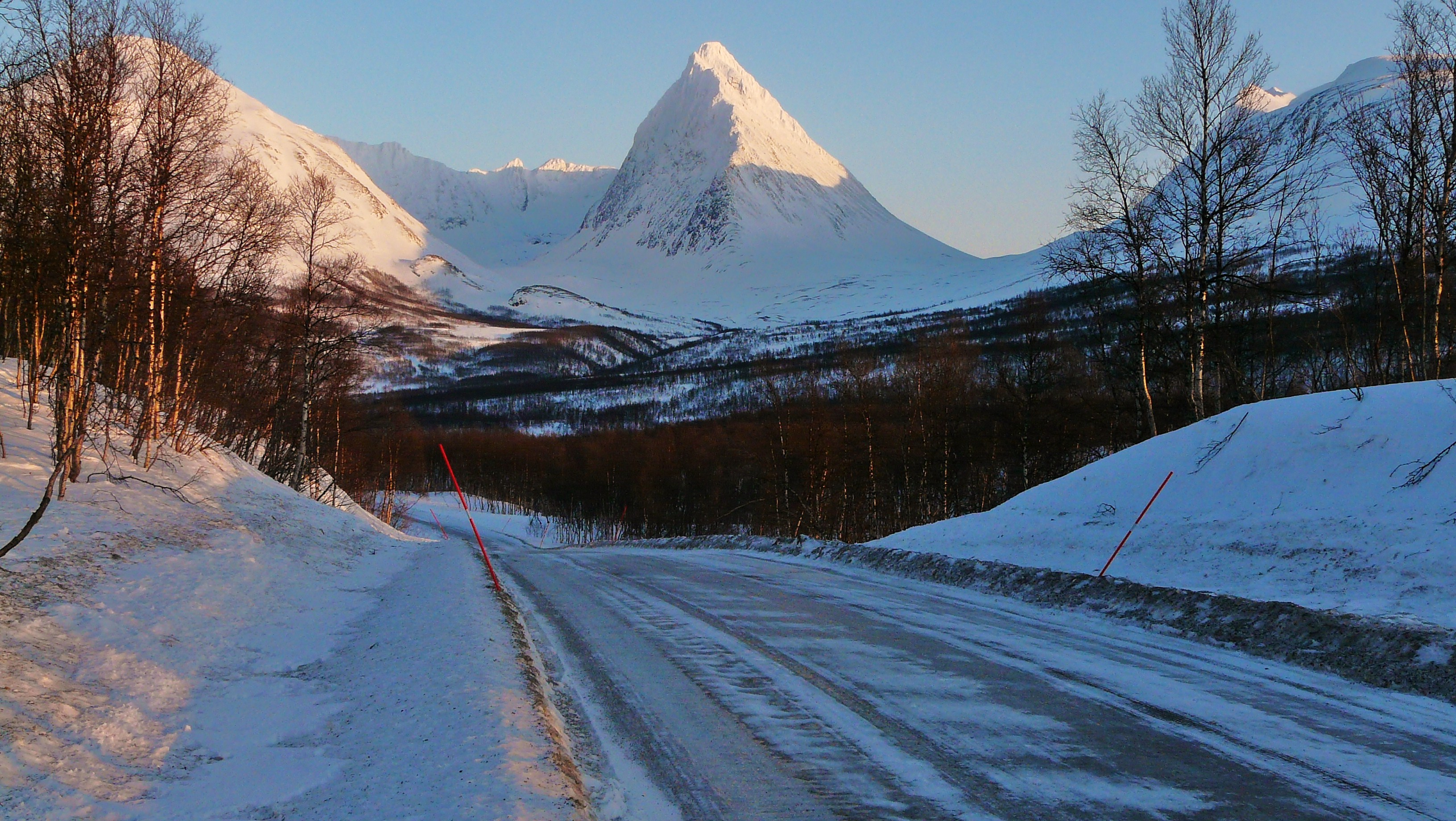
The 1,505 m / 5,000 ft Piggtind in the Lyngen Alps, at the intersection of Tromsø, Balsfjord and Storfjord municipalities.

Troms is located in the northern part of the Scandinavian Peninsula. Due to the long distance to the more densely populated areas of the continent, this is one of the least polluted areas of Europe. Troms has a very rugged and indented coastline facing the Norwegian Sea.

The large and mountainous islands along the coast provide an excellent sheltered waterway on the inside. Starting in the south, the largest islands are: northeastern part of Hinnøya (the southern part is in Nordland), Grytøya, Senja, Kvaløya, Ringvassøya, Reinøy, Vanna, and Arnøy. Some of these islands, most noteworthy Senja, have a rugged outer coast with steep mountains, and a more calm eastern shore.

There are several large fjords that stretch quite far inland. Starting in the south, the largest fjords are Vågsfjorden, Andfjorden (partially in Nordland county), Malangen, Balsfjorden, Ullsfjorden, Lyngen, and Kvænangen. The largest lake is Altevatnet, in the interior of the county.

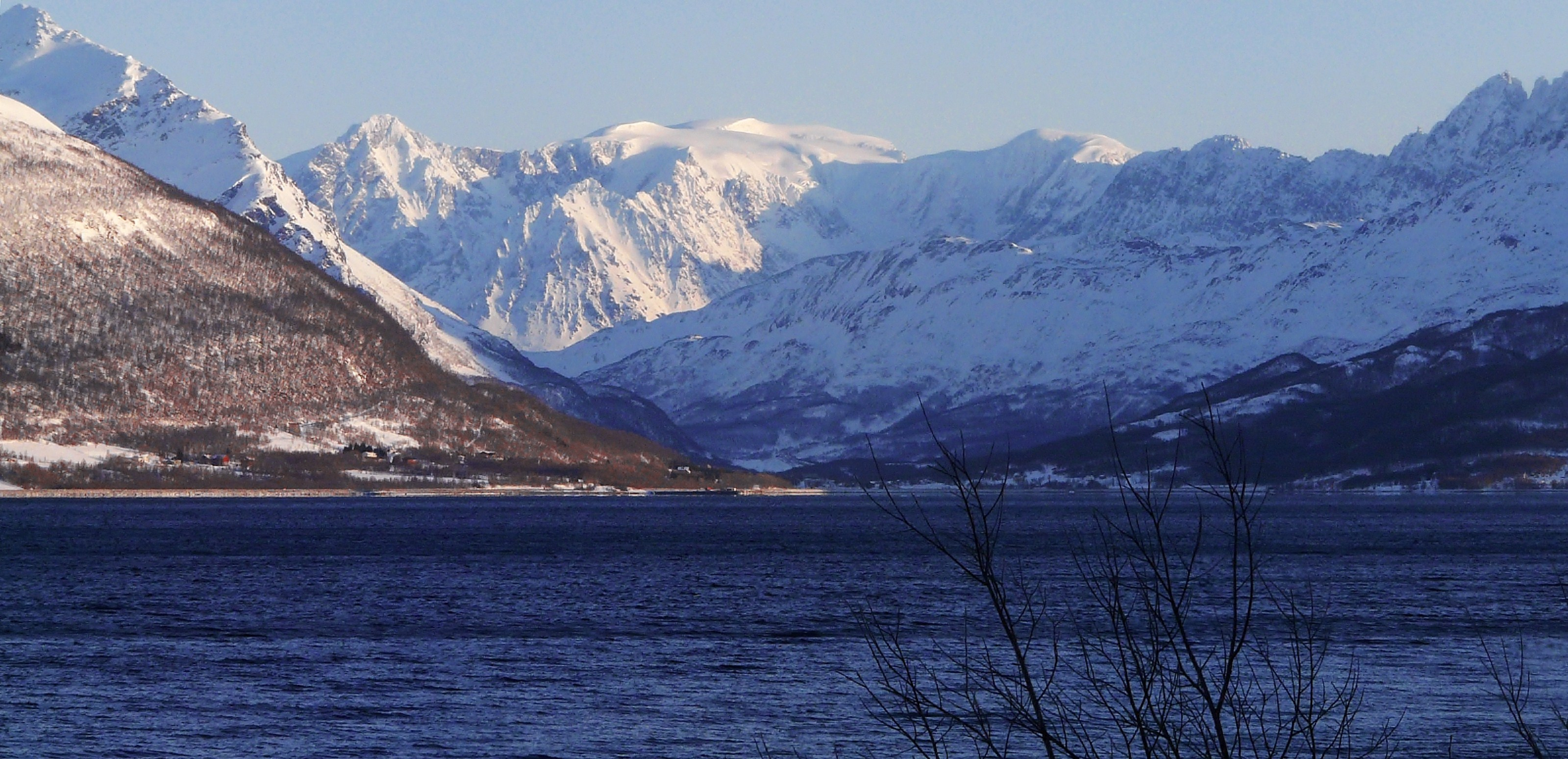
Jiekkevarre reaching more than 1,800 m / 6,000 ft (1,828.80 m) high from Balsfjord Municipality.

There are mountains in all parts of Troms. The most alpine and striking are probably the Lyngen Alps (Lyngsalpene), with several small glaciers and the highest mountain in the county, Jiekkevarre with a height of 1,833 m (6,014 ft). Several glaciers are located in Kvænangen Municipality, including parts of the Øksfjordjøkelen, the last glacier in mainland Norway to drop icebergs directly into the sea, in the Jøkelfjord.

The largest river in Troms by waterflow is Målselva, in Målselv Municipality. The largest waterfall, not the highest, is Målselvfossen at 600 m (2,000 ft) long and 20 m (66 ft) high. Marble is present in parts of Troms, and in numerous caves, in Salangen Municipality and Tjeldsund Municipality.

=== Climate ===
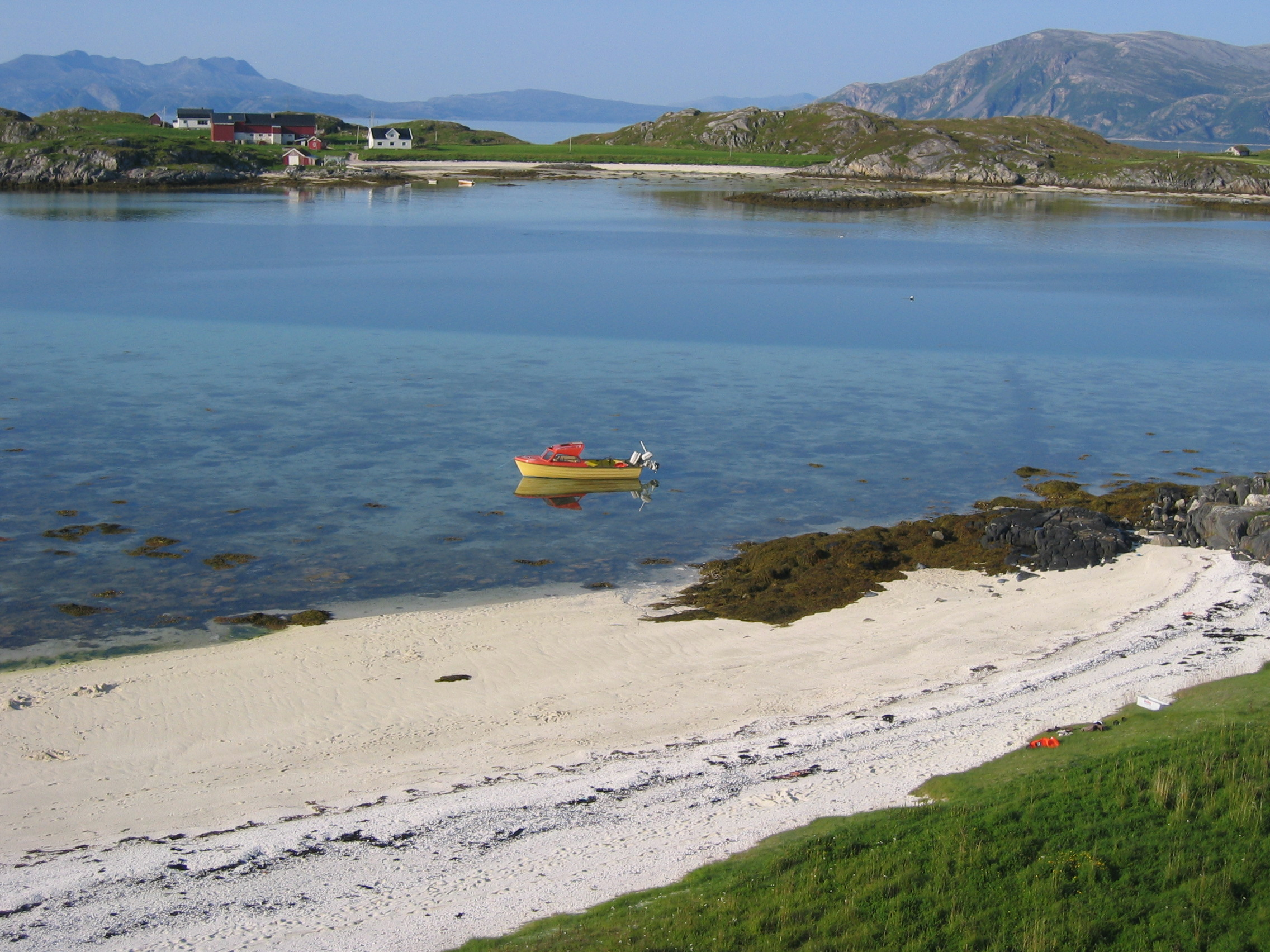
Musvær, islands north of Kvaløya. The coast has fairly mild winters but cool summer days.

Located at a latitude of nearly 70°N, Troms has short, cool summers, but fairly mild winters along the coast due to the temperate sea. Torsvåg Lighthouse in Karlsøy Municipality has a January 24-hr average of −1 °C (30 °F). Tromsø averages −4 °C (25 °F) in January with a daily high of −2 °C (28 °F). July averages 12 °C (54 °F) with a high of 15 °C (59 °F).

Temperatures are typically below freezing for about 5 months (8 months in the mountains), from early November to the beginning of April. Coastal areas are moderated by the sea. With more than 130 years of official weather recordings, the coldest winter temperature ever recorded in Tromsø is −20.1 °C (−4.2 °F) in February 1985.

The all-time high for Troms is 33.5 °C (92.3 °F) recorded in Bardufoss 18 July 2018. Thaws can occur even in mid-winter. There is often snow in abundance, and avalanches were not uncommon in winter. With the prevailing westerlies, lowland areas east of mountain ranges have less precipitation than areas west of the mountains.

Skibotn (elevation: 46 m or 151 ft) in Storfjord Municipality is the location in Norway which has recorded the most days per year with no clouds. Winter temperatures in Målselv Municipality and Bardu Municipality can get down to −35 °C (−31 °F). Summer days can reach 30 °C (86 °F) in inland valleys and the innermost fjord areas, but 15 to 22 °C (59 to 72 °F) is much more common. Along the outer seaboard, a summer day at 15 °C (59 °F) is considered fairly warm.

Climate data for Tromsø, Troms county, Norway 1961-1990
Month	Jan	Feb	Mar	Apr	May	Jun	Jul	Aug	Sep	Oct	Nov	Dec	Year
Mean daily maximum °C (°F)	−2.2 (28.0)	−2.1 (28.2)	−0.4 (31.3)	2.7 (36.9)	7.5 (45.5)	12.5 (54.5)	15.3 (59.5)	13.9 (57.0)	9.3 (48.7)	4.7 (40.5)	0.7 (33.3)	−1.3 (29.7)	5.1 (41.2)
Daily mean °C (°F)	−4.4 (24.1)	−4.2 (24.4)	−2.7 (27.1)	0.3 (32.5)	4.8 (40.6)	9.1 (48.4)	11.8 (53.2)	10.8 (51.4)	6.7 (44.1)	2.7 (36.9)	−1.1 (30.0)	−3.3 (26.1)	2.5 (36.5)
Mean daily minimum °C (°F)	−6.5 (20.3)	−6.5 (20.3)	−5.1 (22.8)	−2.3 (27.9)	2.0 (35.6)	6.1 (43.0)	8.7 (47.7)	7.8 (46.0)	4.5 (40.1)	0.7 (33.3)	−3.0 (26.6)	−5.4 (22.3)	0.1 (32.2)
Average precipitation mm (inches)	95 (3.7)	87 (3.4)	72 (2.8)	64 (2.5)	48 (1.9)	59 (2.3)	77 (3.0)	82 (3.2)	102 (4.0)	131 (5.2)	108 (4.3)	106 (4.2)	1,031 (40.6)
Average precipitation days (≥ 1 mm)	13.7	12.8	11.9	11.2	9.9	11.4	13.4	13.1	15.5	17.1	14.8	15.1	159.9
Mean monthly sunshine hours	3	32	112	160	218	221	205	167	92	49	6	0	1,265
Source: Norwegian Meteorological Institute

=== Sunlight ===
The aurora borealis is a common sight in the whole of Troms, but not in summer as there is no darkness. As with all areas in the polar latitudes, there are extreme variations in daylight between the seasons. As a consequence of this, the length of daylight increases in late winter and spring. It decreases in autumn by 10 minutes from one day to the next.

Sunrise and sunset times on the 15th of each month in Tromsø
Jan	Feb	Mar	Apr	May	Jun	Jul	Aug	Sep	Oct	Nov	Dec
11:31 – 12:17	08:16 – 15:43	06:07 – 17:41	04:43 – 20:48	01:43 – 23:48	Midnight sun	Midnight sun	03:44 – 21:50	05:56 – 19:20	07:54 – 17:04	09:25 – 13:32	Polar night
Source: Almanakk for Norge; University of Oslo, 2010. Note: The sun is below the horizon until 15 January in Tromsø, but the low sun is blocked by mountains and not visible until 21 January.

== Nature ==
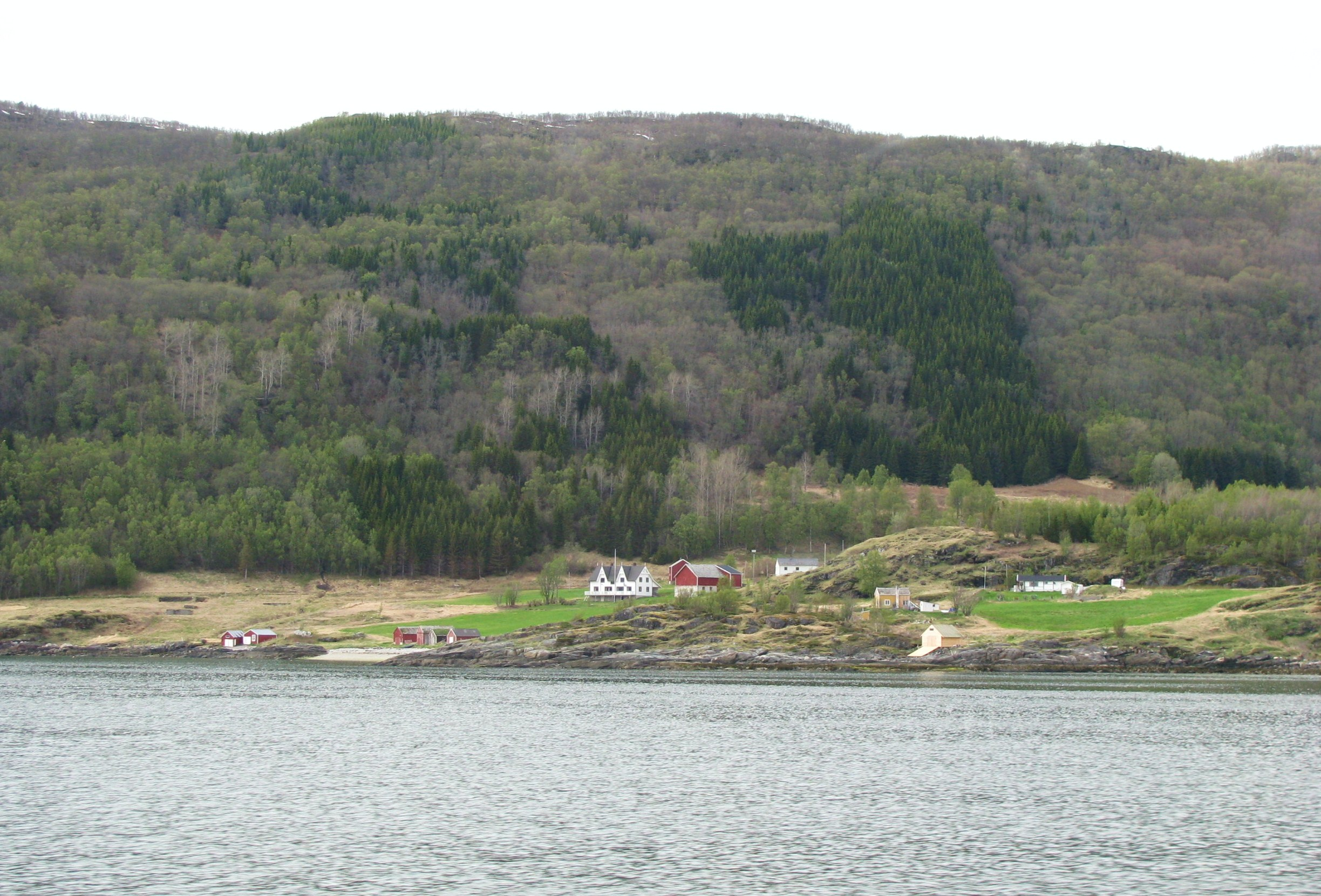
Small farms and planted spruce. Dyrøy Municipality, May 2010

Moose, red fox, hare, stoat, and small rodents are common in all of Troms county. Brown bears are sighted in the interior parts of the county in the summer. Other animals that can be seen are reindeer (interior mountain areas, with Sami owners), wolverine (interior mountain areas), Eurasian otters (along the coast and rivers), Eurasian lynx (in the forests), and harbour porpoises in the fjords. Sperm whales, killer whales and humpback whales are often seen in Andfjorden. Some of the common birds are ptarmigan, sea eagles, European herring gulls, and great cormorants.

The sheltered valleys in the interior of Troms have the highest tree line (summer warmth and length is the limiting factor), with downy birch reaching an elevation of 700 m (2,300 ft) on the southern slope of Njunis. All over Troms county birch trees forms the tree lines, often 200 metres (660 ft) above other trees. Rowan, aspen, willow, grey alder, and bird cherry are common in the lower elevations.

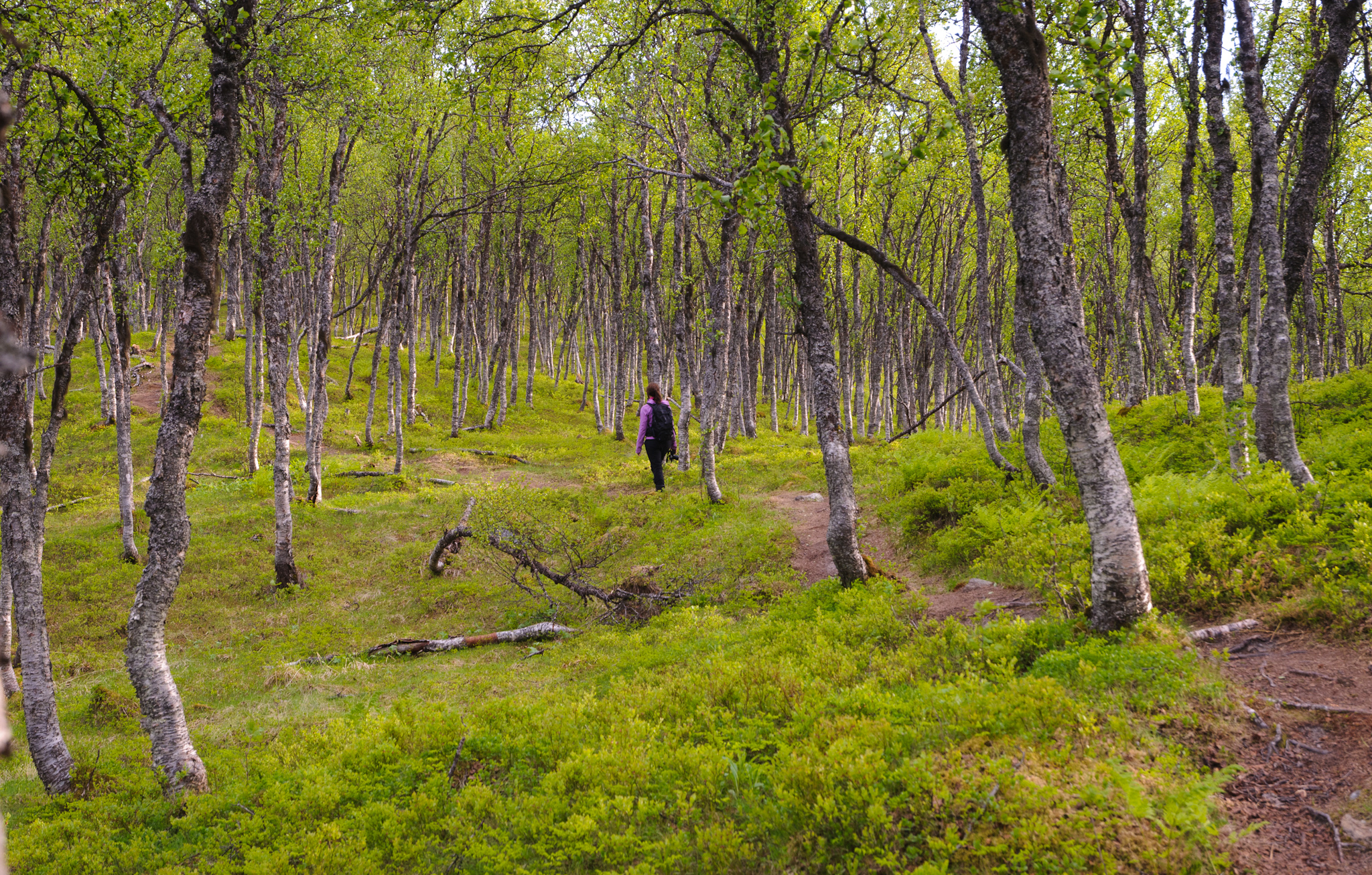
Hiking in early summer

Scots pine reaches an elevation of almost 400 m (1,300 ft) in Dividalen, where some of the largest trees are 500 years old. The upper part of the valley is protected by Øvre Dividal National Park, which was enlarged in 2006. In 2011, the Rohkunborri National Park (571 square kilometres or 220 square miles) was established in Bardu Municipality, bordering Sweden and only a few kilometers south of Øvre Dividal National Park.

The inland valleys, like Østerdalen (with Altevatnet), Kirkesdalen, Dividalen, Rostadalen, Signaldalen, and Skibotndalen, are perfect for summer hiking, with their varied nature, mostly dry climate and not too difficult terrain, although there are many accessible mountains for energetic hikers.

Reisadalen is one of the most idyllic river valleys in Norway. From Storslett in Nordreisa Municipality the valley stretches south-southeast, covered with birch, pine, grey alder, and willow. The northern part of the valley is 5 km (3.1 mi) wide, with 1,200-metre (3,900 ft) high mountains on both sides. The southern part of the valley narrows to a few hundred metres (canyon), with increasingly dry climate. The valley floor is fairly flat with little height difference for 70 km (43 mi) to Bilto. The Reisa river can be navigated by canoe or river boat for much of this distance.

The salmon swim 90 km (56 mi) up the river, and some 137 different species of birds have been observed. Several rivers cascade down into the valley; the Mollisfossen waterfall is 269 m (883 ft). The valley ends 120 km (75 mi) southeast of Storslett, as the vast and more barren Finnmarksvidda plateau takes over. Reisa National Park protects the upper part of the valley.

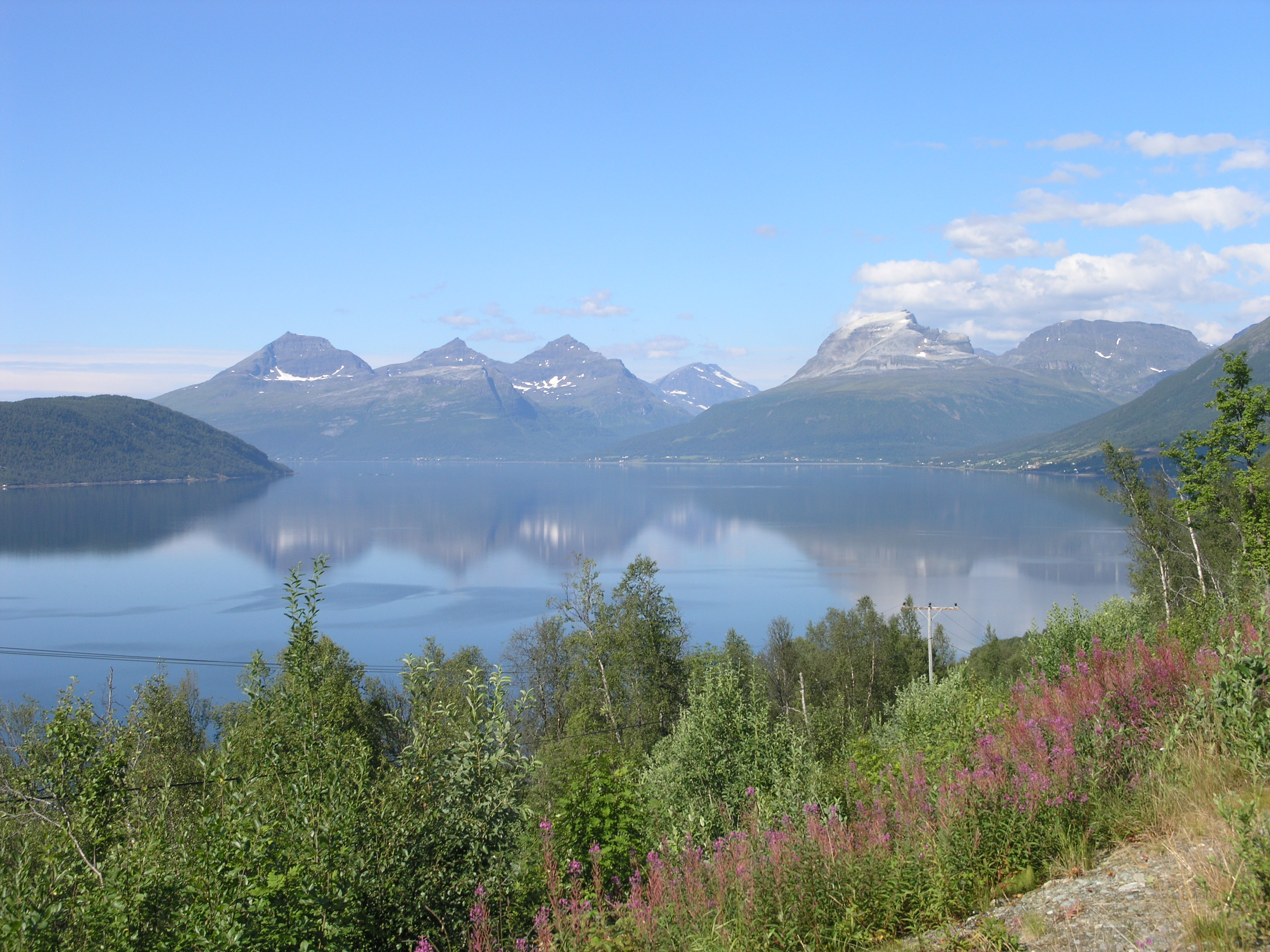
Balsfjord in central Troms

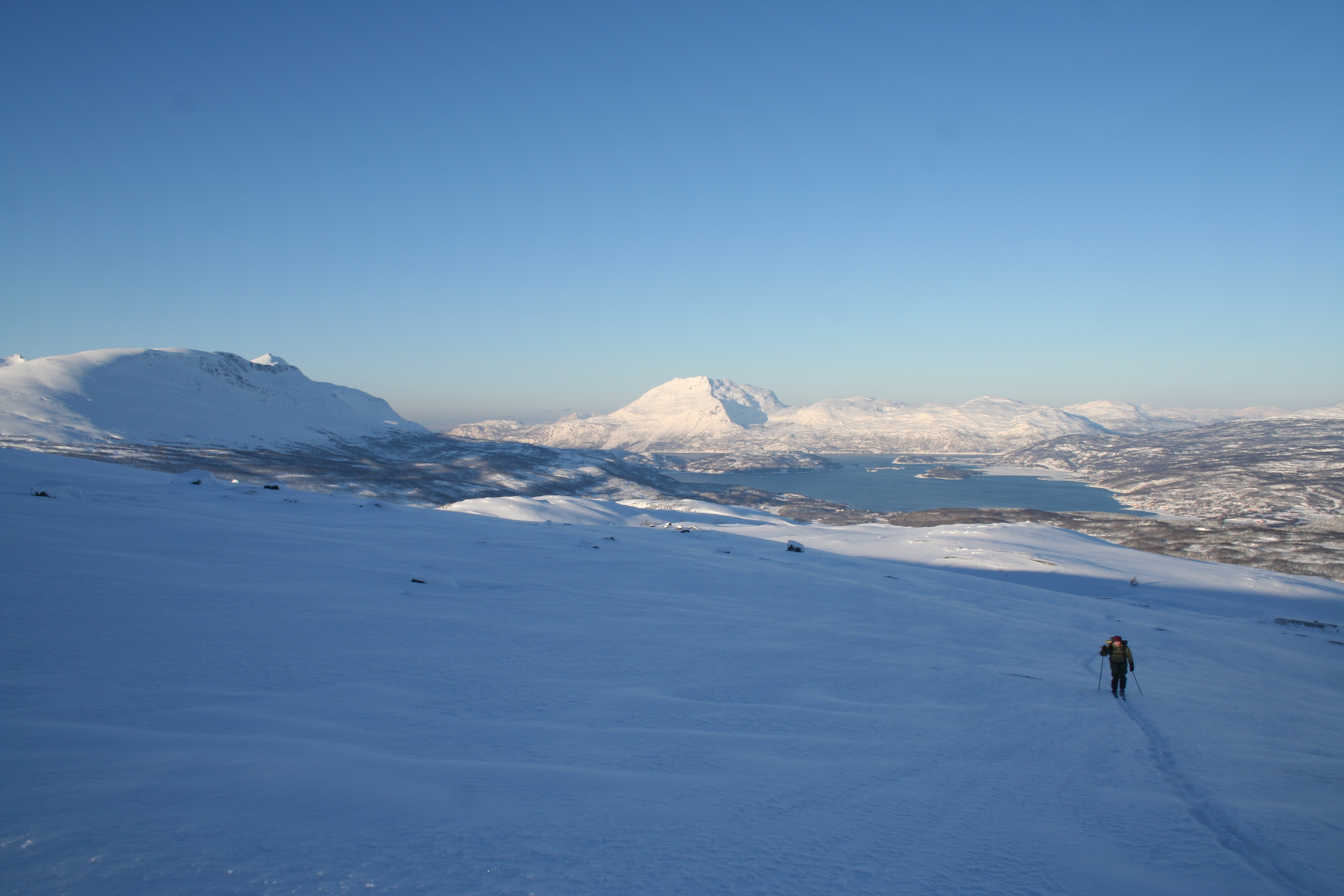
Winter in the mountains of Salangen Municipality. Snow cover lasts usually into late April or early May in the lowlands.

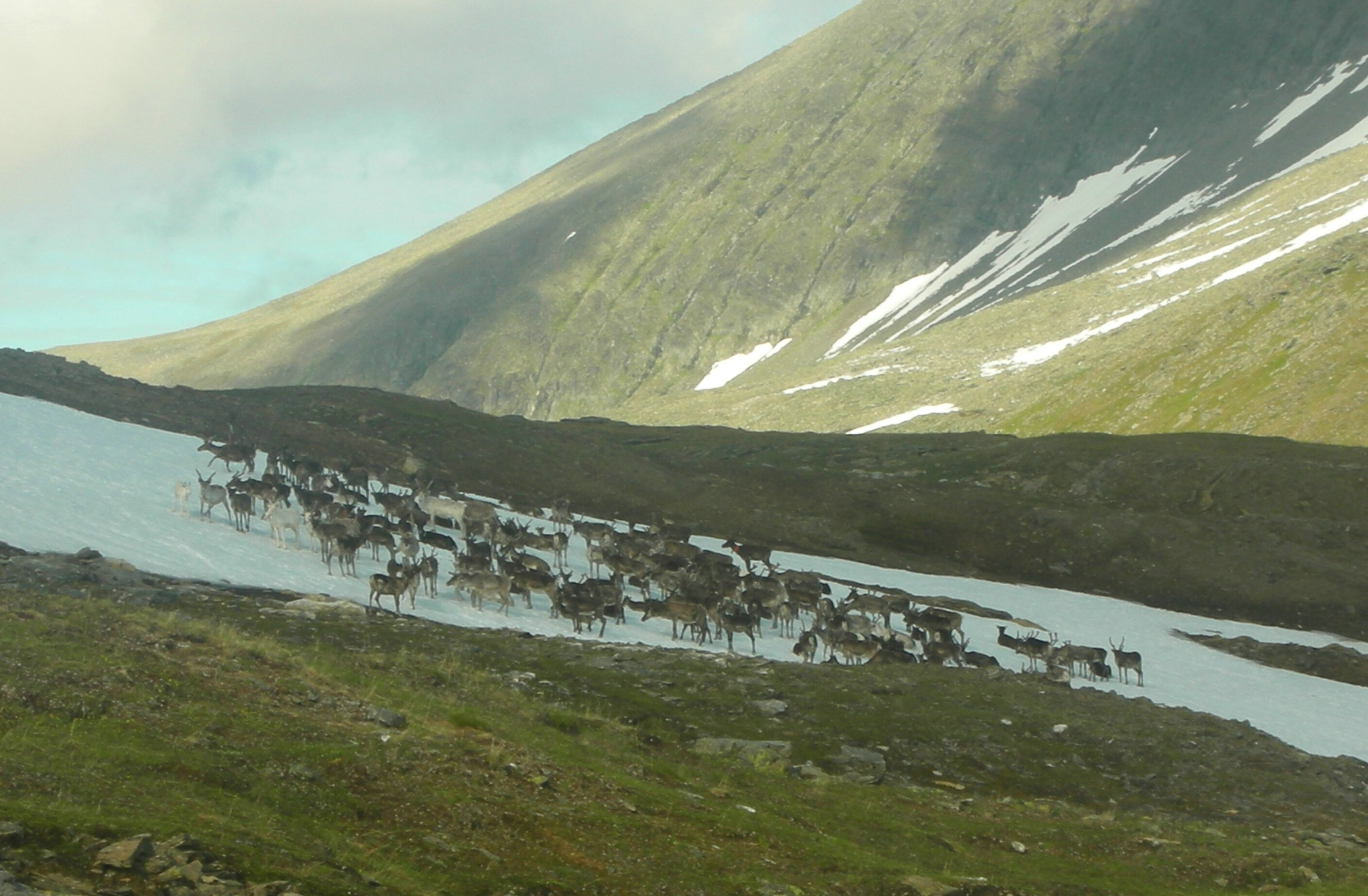
Reindeer near Tromsdalstind

== Economy ==
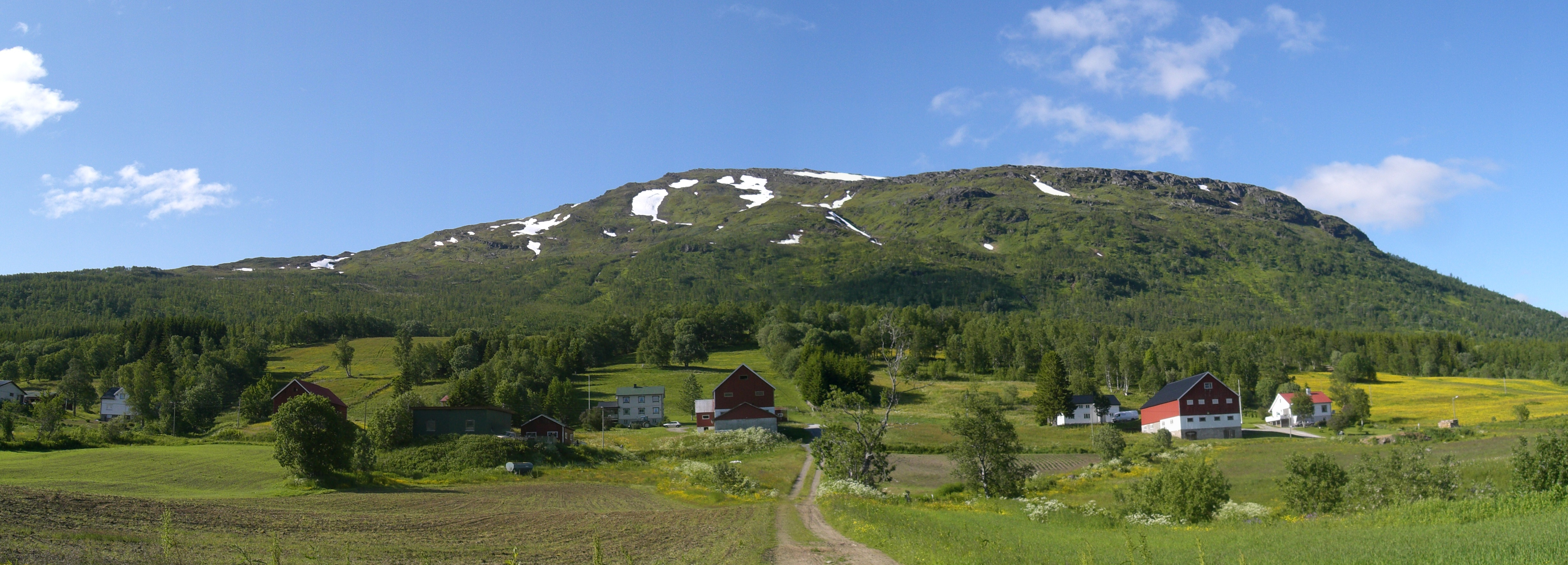
Small farms and mountains in Lenvik Municipality, June 2007.

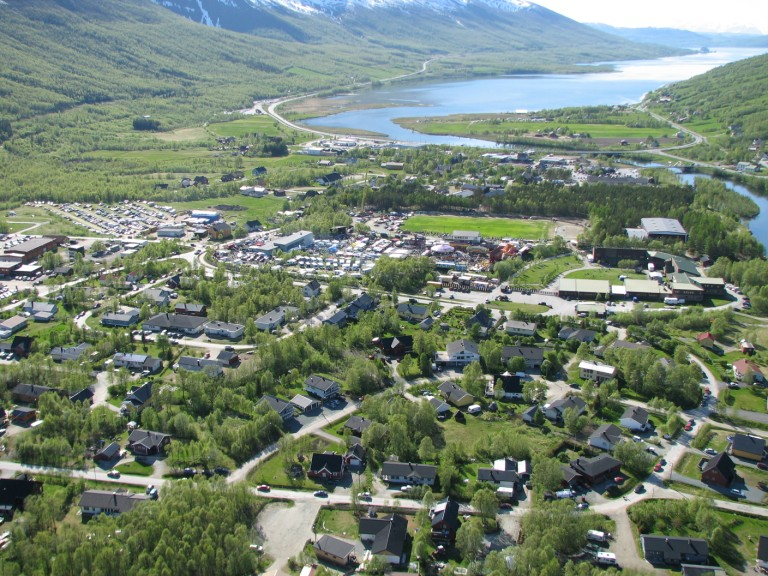
Many villages are located at the head of fjords. This is Nordkjosbotn at the head of Balsfjord, 1-hr drive south of Tromsø.

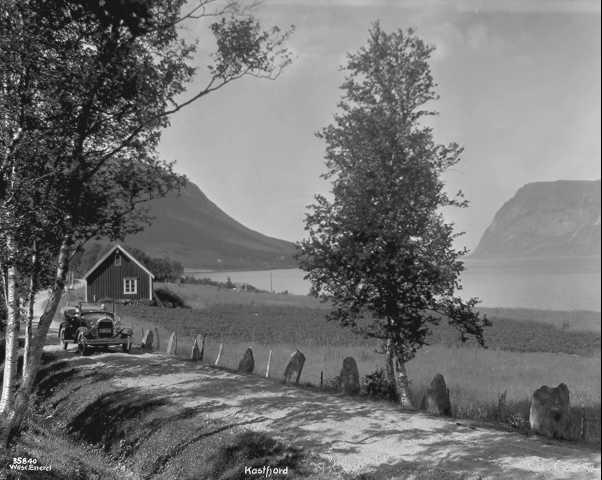
An agricultural area near Harstad in 1930

The city of Tromsø, in the north central part, is the county seat and an Arctic seaport, and seat of the world's northernmost university, renowned for research about the aurora borealis. The University of Tromsø has an astrophysical observatory located in Skibotn.

Tromsø is the only municipality in the county with a strong population growth. Most of the smaller municipalities have decreasing populations as the young and educated moved to the cities, often in the southern part of Norway. Harstad is a commercial centre for the southern part of the county, and has been chosen by Statoil as its main office in Northern Norway.

Along the coast and on the islands, fishing is dominant. Important ports for the fishing fleet are Skjervøy, Tromsø, and Harstad. There is also some agriculture, especially in the southern part of the county, which has a longer growing season (150 days in Harstad). Balsfjord Municipality is often regarded to be the most northern municipality with substantial agricultural activity in Norway, although there is also agriculture further north.

The Norwegian armed forces are vital employers in the Troms, having the seat of the 6th army division, Bardufoss Air Station, helicopter wings and radar stations in the county. There are hospitals in Tromsø (a university hospital and the main hospital for North Norway) and Harstad.

While the busiest airport in Troms is Tromsø Airport, the southern part included Harstad/Narvik Airport, Evenes and Bardufoss Airport, with Sørkjosen Airport in the northeast. The E6 cuts through the county from Nordland into Gratangen Municipality in the south to Kvænangen Municipality in the north and then into Finnmark. The E8 highway runs from Tromsø to Finland via Nordkjosbotn and the Skibotn valley.

There are several large bridges. Some of the largest are Tjeldsund Bridge, Mjøsund Bridge, Gisund Bridge, Tromsø Bridge and Sandnessund Bridge. There are several undersea road tunnels; Rolla to Andørja (in Ibestad Municipality), Tromsøya to the mainland (Tromsø Municipality), Kvaløya to Ringvassøya (also in Tromsø), and Skjervøya to the mainland (in Skjervøy Municipality. The roads are well maintained, but have to go long detours around fjords. For this reason passenger boats are fairly popular, for example between Tromsø and Harstad. There are also commercial flights inside the county of Troms.

There is no railway in Troms. In 2013, the government of Finland expressed interest in building a railway from the Finnish rail network to port facilities at Skibotn, though they also stated that they could not finance much of the cost.

== History ==
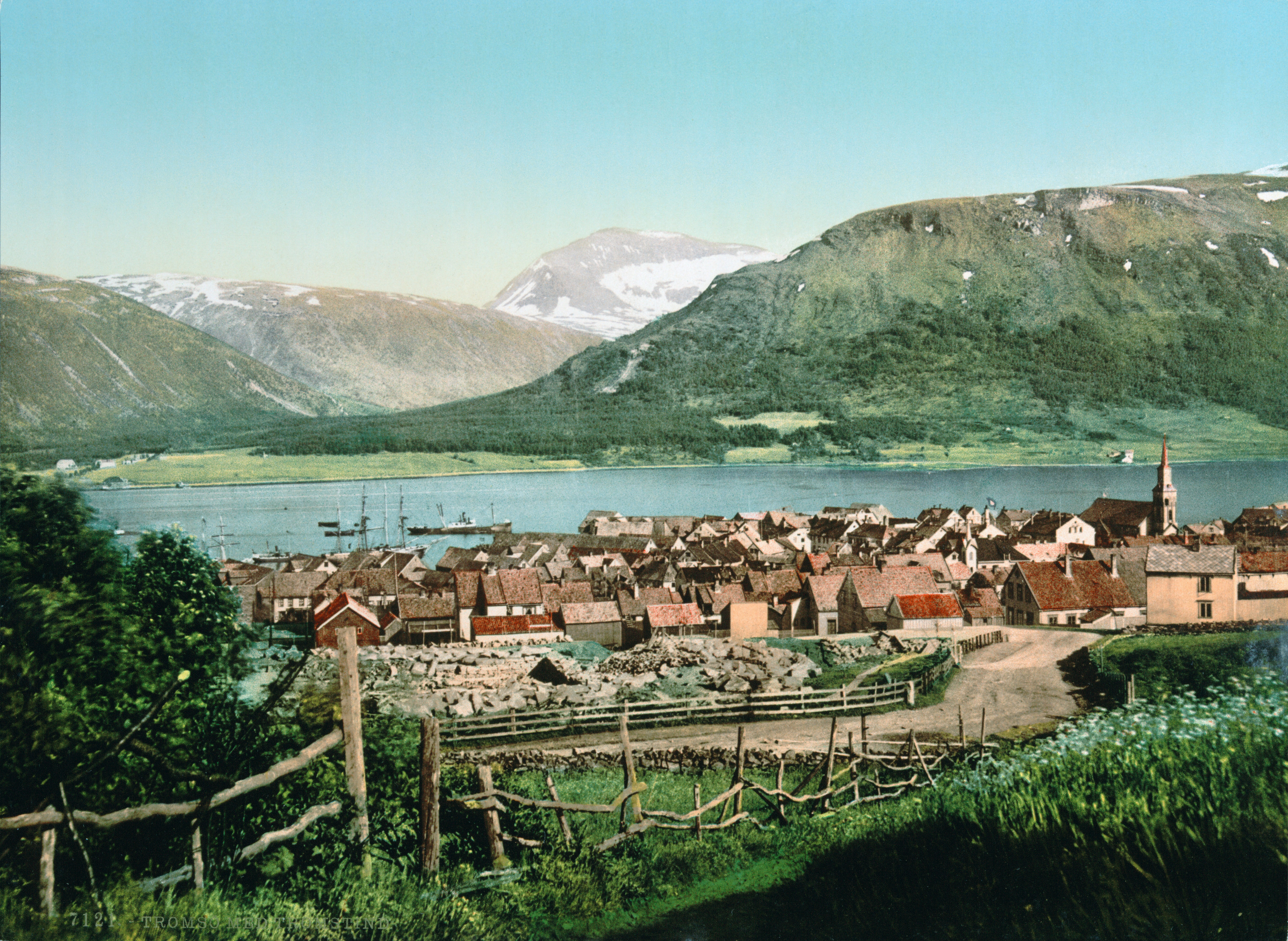
Tromsø in 1900. Tromsø was for many decades an important base for hunting and whaling in the Arctic.

Historical population
Year	Pop.	±%
1951	117,564	—
1961	127,771	+8.7%
1971	136,805	+7.1%
1981	146,818	+7.3%
1991	146,816	−0.0%
2001	151,777	+3.4%
2011	157,554	+3.8%
2021?	168,953	+7.2%
2031?	176,342	+4.4%
Source: Statistics Norway.

Troms has been settled since the early Stone Age, and there are prehistoric rock carvings at several locations (for instance Ibestad and Balsfjord). These people made their living from hunting, fishing and gathering.

The first of the current ethnic groups to settle in the county were the Sami people, who inhabited Sápmi, an area much larger than today's Nordland, Troms and Finnmark counties. Archeological evidence has shown that a Norse iron-based culture in the late Roman Iron Age (200–400 AD), reaches as far north as Karlsøy Municipality (north of today's city of Tromsø), but not further northeast.

The Norse with their iron and agriculture settled along the coast and in some of the larger fjords, while the Sami lived in the same fjord areas, usually just into the fjord and in the interior. From the 10th century, Norse settlements start to appear along the coast further north, reaching into what is today the county of Finnmark.

Southern and Mid-Troms was a petty kingdom in the Viking Age, and considered part of Hålogaland. Ottar from Hålogaland met King Alfred the Great around 890. The Viking leader Tore Hund had his seat at Bjarkøya. According to the sagas, Tore Hund speared King Olav Haraldsson at the Battle of Stiklestad. He also traded and fought in Bjarmaland, today the area of Arkhangelsk in northern Russia. Trondenes (near today's Harstad) was also a central Viking power centre, and seems to have been a gathering place.

== Demographics ==
Religion in Troms
religion	percent
Christianity	88.80%
Islam	0.45%
Buddhism	0.14%
Other	10.61%

The Kven residents of Troms are largely descendants of Finnish immigrants who arrived in the area before the 19th century from Finland because of war and famine. They settled mainly in the northeastern part of Troms, in the municipalities of Kvænangen, Nordreisa, Skjervøy, Gáivuotna-Kåfjord and Storfjord, and some also reached Balsfjord and Lyngen.

== Municipalities ==
Troms county has 21 municipalities.

Map of municipalities in Troms county.

1. Balsfjord Municipality
2. Bardu Municipality
3. Dyrøy Municipality
4. Gratangen Municipality
5. Harstad Municipality
6. Ibestad Municipality
7. Gáivuotna-Kåfjord Municipality
8. Karlsøy Municipality
9. Kvæfjord Municipality
10. Kvænangen Municipality
11. Lavangen Municipality
12. Lyngen Municipality
13. Målselv Municipality
14. Nordreisa Municipality
15. Salangen Municipality
16. Senja Municipality
17. Skjervøy Municipality
18. Sørreisa Municipality
19. Storfjord Municipality
20. Tjeldsund Municipality
21. Tromsø Municipality

== Photo gallery ==
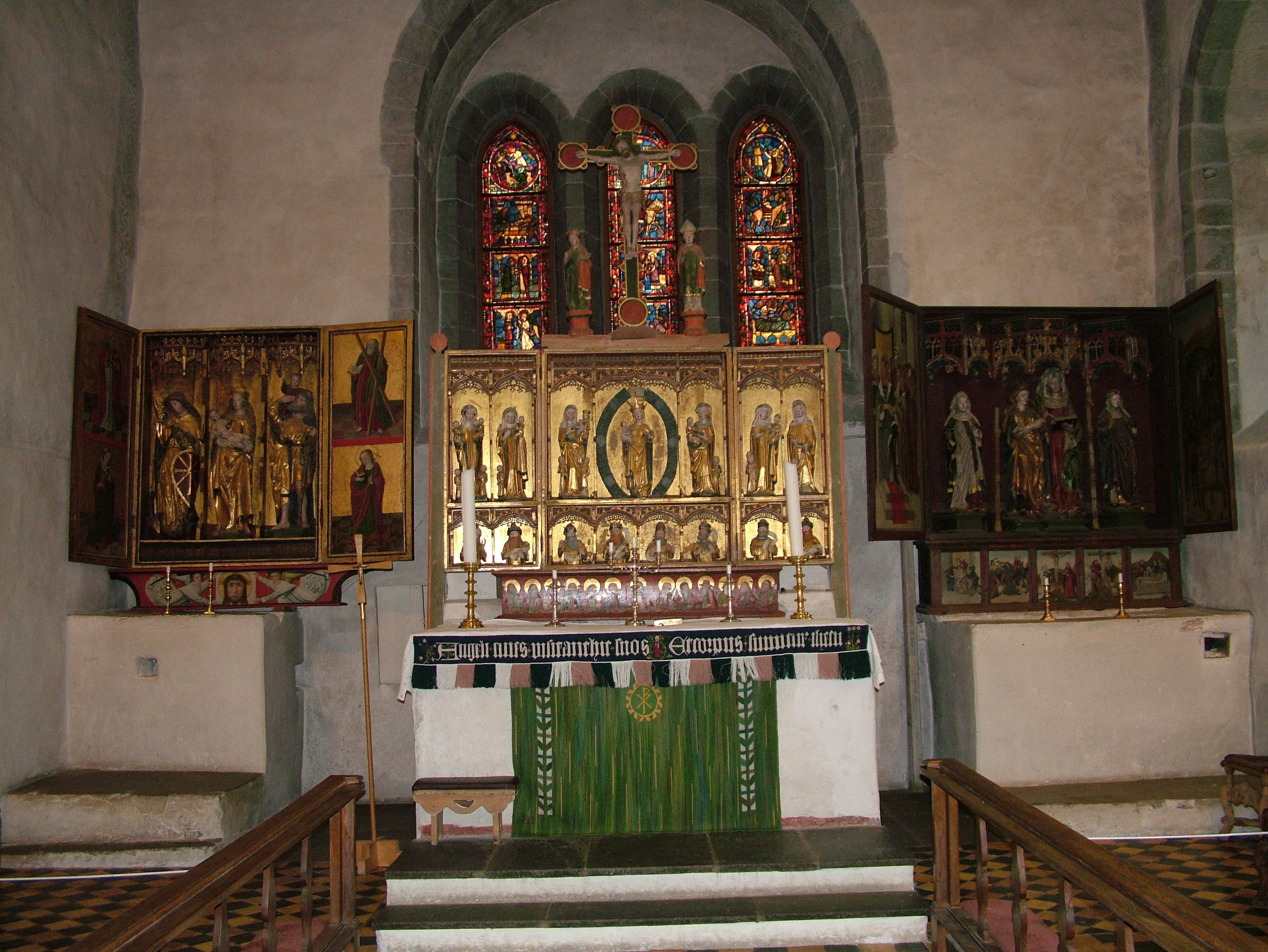
Inside Trondenes Church, the only medieval church in Troms

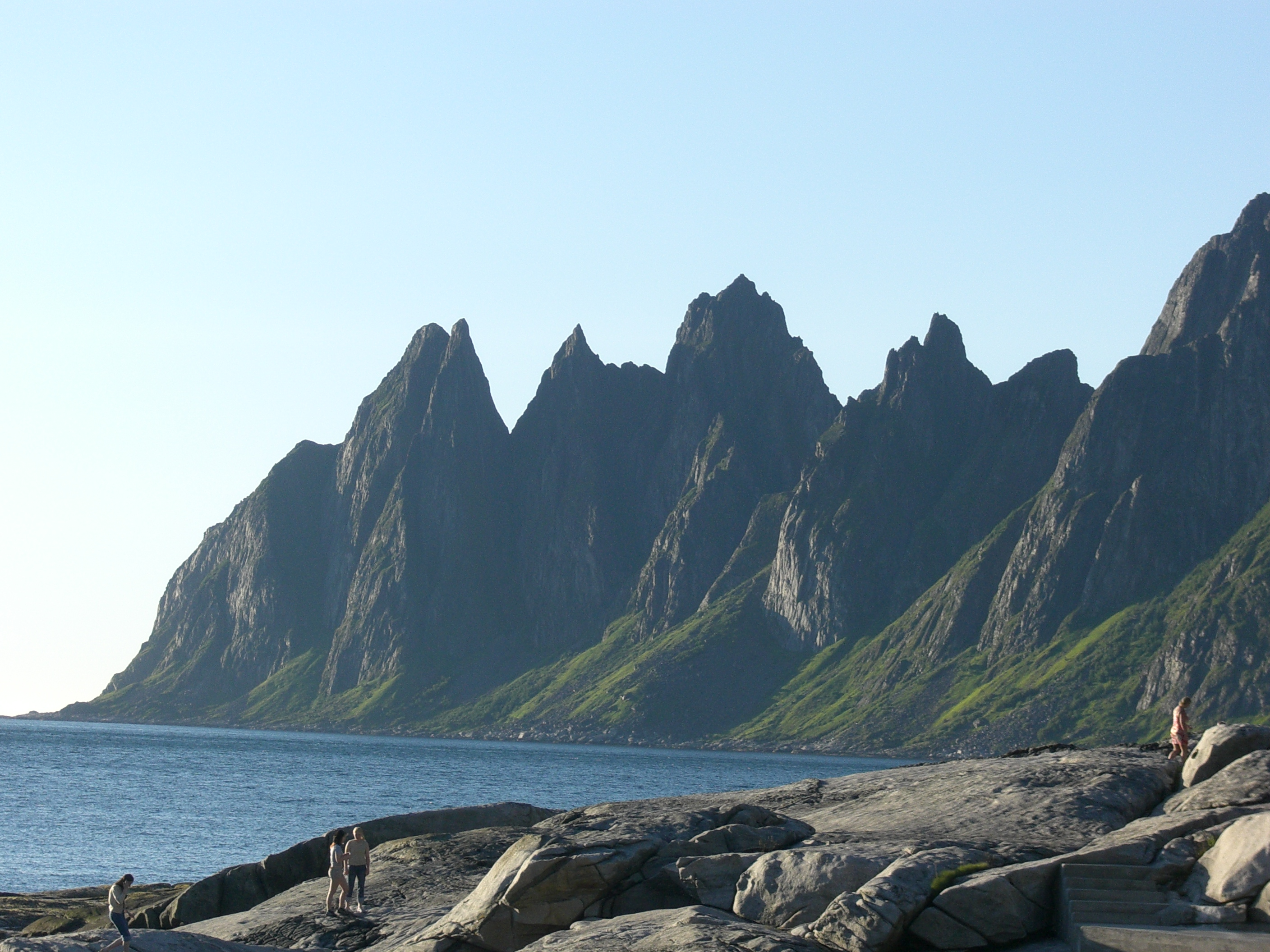
Ersfjorden, Senja island

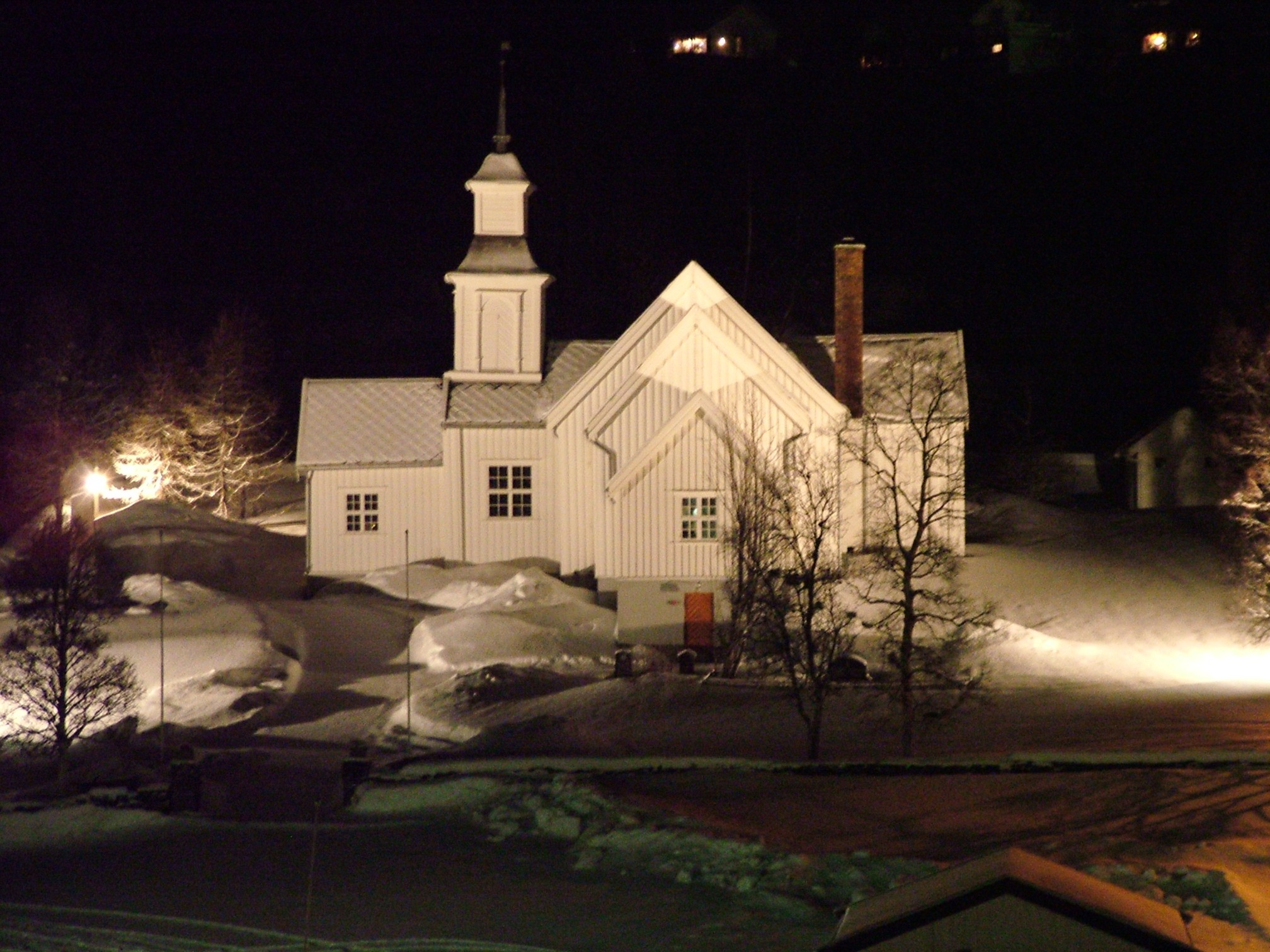
Skjervøy Church in northern Troms at night, February 2004

Sørvik in Harstad is at the southern tip of Troms

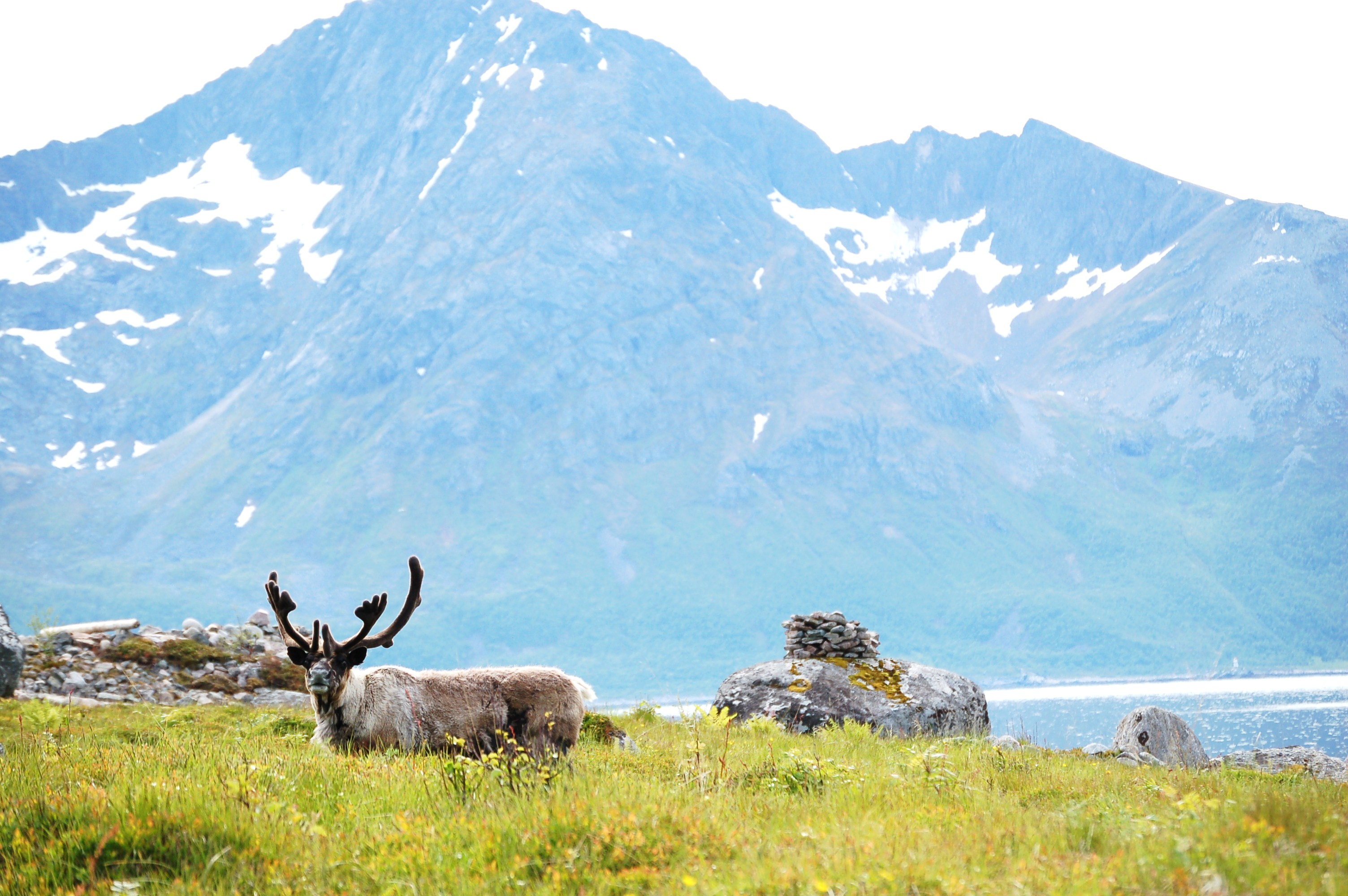
Reindeer in Norway (Rekvika, Troms, Norway)

Summer evening in Jøkelfjord, Kvænangen.

== Notable people ==
- Samuel Georg Simeon Wennberg, member of parliament

== See also ==
- Hålogalandsallmenningen
