= Skjervøy =

Skjervøy or Skjervøya may refer to the following:

== Places ==
- Skjervøy Municipality, a municipality in Troms county, Norway
- Skjervøy (village), a village in Skjervøy Municipality in Troms county, Norway
- Skjervøya, an island in Skjervøy Municipality in Troms county, Norway
- Skjervøy Bridge, a bridge in Skjervøy Municipality in Troms county, Norway
- Skjervøya (Trøndelag), an island group in Osen Municipality in Trøndelag county, Norway

== Other ==
- Skjervøy Church, a church in Skjervøy Municipality in Troms county, Norway
- Skjervøy IK, a sports club based in Skjervøy Municipality in Troms county, Norway
