= Arnøya =

Island in Skjervøy, Norway

Arnøya (Norwegian) Árdni (Northern Sami)
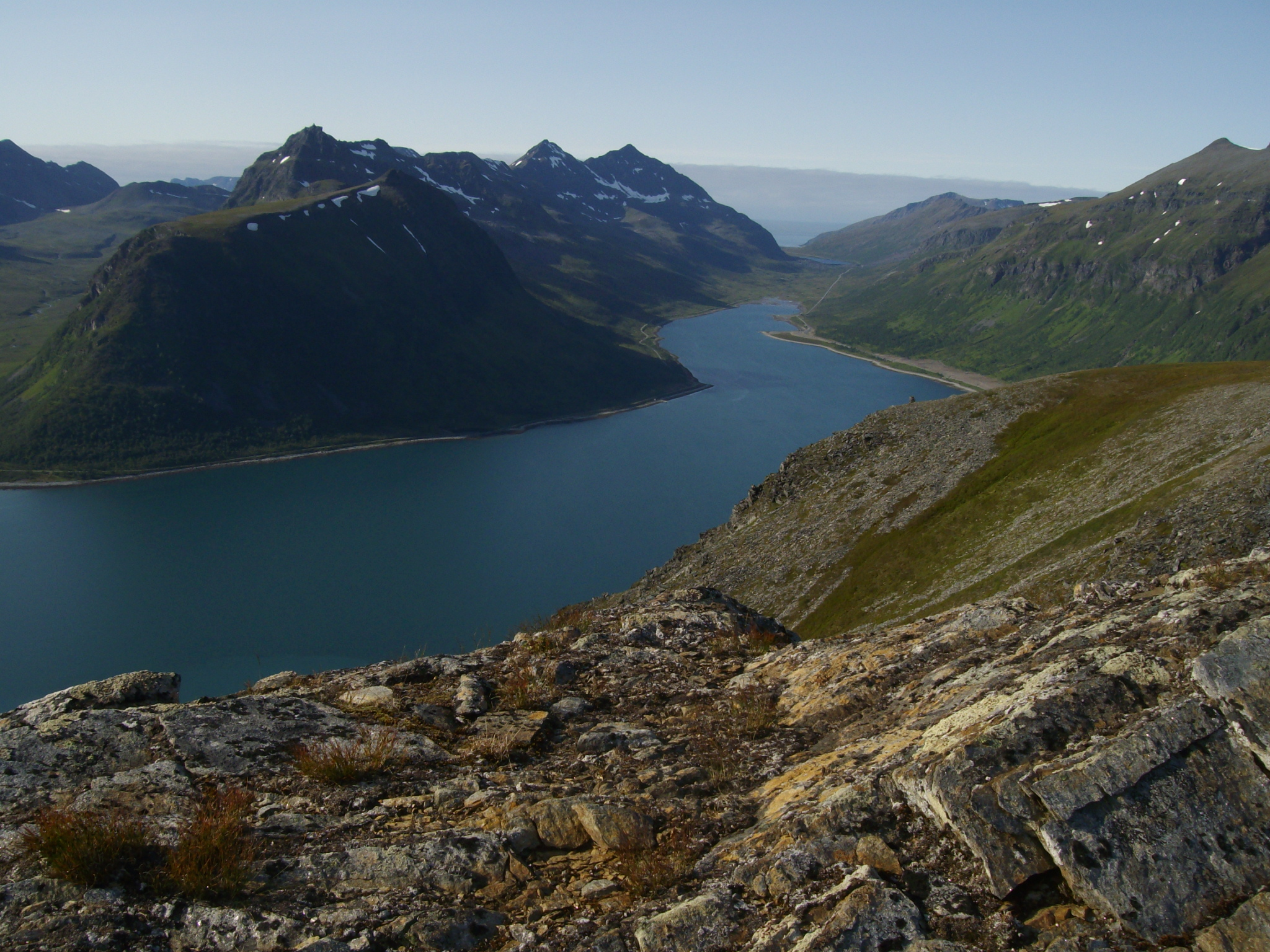
- Langfjorden, Arnøya island
- Interactive map of Arnøya (Norwegian); Árdni (Northern Sami)

Geography
- Location: Troms, Norway
- Coordinates: 70.0634°N 20.7366°E
- Area: 276 km^{2} (107 sq mi)
- Area rank: 15th in Norway
- Length: 23.6 km (14.66 mi)
- Width: 14.4 km (8.95 mi)
- Coastline: 91 km (56.5 mi)
- Highest elevation: 1,170 m (3840 ft)
- Highest point: Arnøyhøgda

Administration
- Norway
- County: Troms
- Municipality: Skjervøy Municipality

Demographics
- Population: 295 (2021)
- Pop. density: 1.1/km^{2} (2.8/sq mi)

Arnøya (Norwegian) or Árdni (Northern Sami) is the 15th largest island in Norway. The 276-square-kilometre (107 sq mi) island is located in Skjervøy Municipality in Troms county. The highest peak is the 1,170-metre (3,840 ft) tall mountain Arnøyhøgda. There are regular ferry connections to the island from the nearby islands of Laukøya and Kågen, but there are no road connections to the island. Arnøy Church is located on the southern shore of the island.

The villages of Årviksand, Arnøyhamn, Akkarvik, and Lauksletta are located on the island. The island of Laukøya is located just to the east, Skjervøya and Kågen are to the southeast, and Vannøya is to the west. The Ullsfjorden lies to the west, the Lyngen fjord lies to the south, the Kvænangen fjord lies to the east, and the Norwegian Sea lies to the north.

The Lyngen Alps are located south of Arnøya and they are a popular place for extreme skiers. Arnøya is also becoming a popular skiing destination.

== See also ==
- List of islands of Norway by area
- List of islands of Norway
