= Små-Hakksteinan =

Islets in Skjervøy, Troms County, Norway

Native name: Northern Sami: Fáŋgasuolu
- Interactive map of Små-Hakksteinan

Geography
- Location: Troms, Norway
- Coordinates: 70°00′40″N 20°56′30″E

Små-Hakksteinan is a small, uninhabited group of islets located in the municipality of Skjervøy, Troms County, Norway.

The islets are legally recognized and documented under both their traditional Norwegian name and their Northern Sámi geographic name by the official Norwegian mapping registry, Kartverket.

== Environmental protection ==
Små-Hakksteinan is fully contained within the Hakstein Nature Reserve, an environmental sanctuary established by the Norwegian government on June 4, 2004. The reserve was created to protect local seabird habitats. To ensure undisturbed breeding cycles for the wildlife, a strict seasonal ban is enforced on all human traffic. Accessing, landing, or traveling on the islets is legally forbidden every year between May 1 and July 15.

== Etymology and language ==
The islets carry official names in both regional languages of northern Norway. The name Små-Hakksteinan is the traditional Norwegian designation, while Fáŋgasuolu is the official Northern Sámi geographic name registry entry.
