= Laukøya =

Island in Skjervøy, Norway

Laukøya (Norwegian) Unna Ártnás (Northern Sami)
- Interactive map of Laukøya (Norwegian); Unna Ártnás (Northern Sami)

Geography
- Location: Troms, Norway
- Coordinates: 70.1061°N 20.8417°E
- Area: 35.8 km^{2} (13.8 sq mi)
- Length: 10.2 km (6.34 mi)
- Width: 5.5 km (3.42 mi)
- Coastline: 25.2 km (15.66 mi)
- Highest elevation: 821 m (2694 ft)
- Highest point: Langnestinden

Administration
- Norway
- County: Troms
- Municipality: Skjervøy Municipality

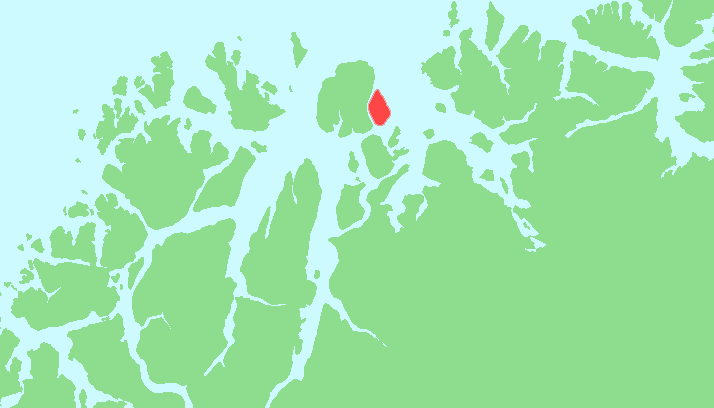
Locator map of Laukøya, Troms, Norway

Laukøya (Norwegian) or Unna Ártnás (Northern Sami) is an island in Skjervøy Municipality in Troms county, Norway. The island of Arnøya is immediately to the west of Laukøya, the Kvænangen fjord lies to the east, and the islands of Kågen and Skjervøya lie to the south. There is a regular ferry connection between Laukøya, Kågen, and Arnøya, but no road connections.

== See also ==
- List of islands of Norway by area
- List of islands of Norway
