= Vorterøya =

Island in Skjervøy, Norway

Vorterøya (Norwegian); Virtá (Northern Sami)
- Interactive map of: Vorterøya (Norwegian); Virtá (Northern Sami)

Geography
- Location: Troms, Norway
- Coordinates: 69.9396°N 20.6462°E
- Highest elevation: 235 m (771 ft)
- Highest point: Viten

Administration
- Norway
- County: Troms
- Municipality: Skjervøy Municipality

Demographics
- Population: 10

Vorterøya (Norwegian)

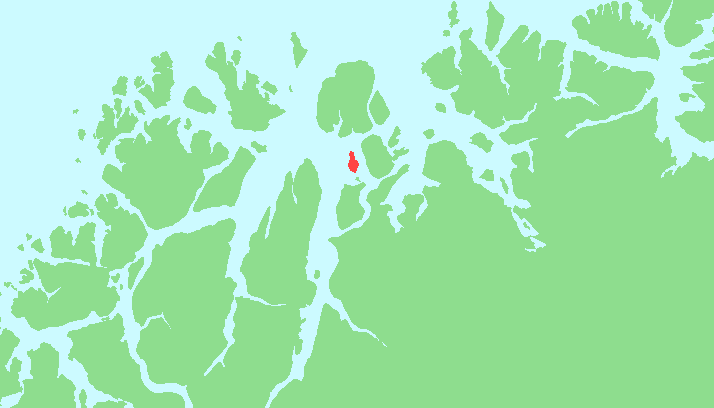

or Virtá (Northern Sami)[1] is an island located in Skjervøy Municipality in Troms county, Norway. Vorterøya is located along the Lyngen fjord to the east of the island of Kågen and to the north of the island of Uløya. There are about 10 residents on the island who live there year-round. Many other residents live there in the summer months, but spend the winters elsewhere.[2]

== See also ==
- List of islands of Norway by area
- List of islands of Norway
