= Akkarvik =

- Village
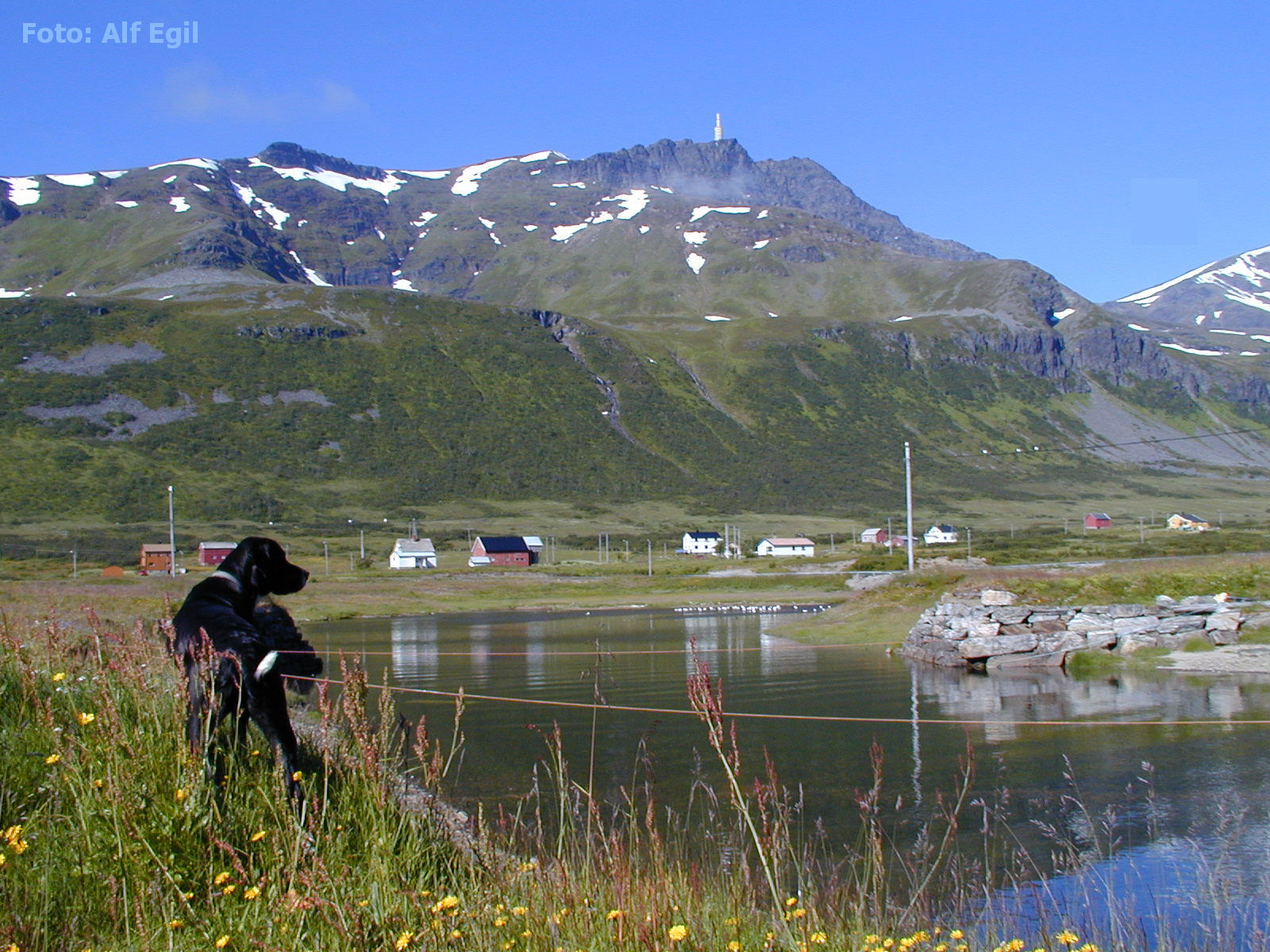
- View of the village
- Interactive map of Akkarvik
- Location within Troms Location within Norway
- Coordinates: 70°03′50″N 20°29′33″E
- Country: Norway
- Region: Northern Norway
- County: Troms
- District: Nord-Troms
- Municipality: Skjervøy Municipality
- Elevation: 1 m (3.3 ft)
- Time zone: UTC+01:00 (CET)
  - Summer (DST): UTC+02:00 (CEST)
- Post Code: 9190 Akkarvik

Akkarvik is a small village along the Langfjorden in Skjervøy Municipality, in the northern part of Troms county, Norway. It is located about 14 km (8.7 mi) south of the village of Årviksand and about 5 kilometres (3.1 mi) west of the village of Arnøyhamn on the south side of the island of Arnøya. It has been populated since the 17th century. At its peak during the 1950s, about 400 people lived there. At that time, there was a shop, post office, and a bakery. By the year 2001, however, the population has dwindled down to 24 people in 14 private homes. In 2021, the population are down to 10.

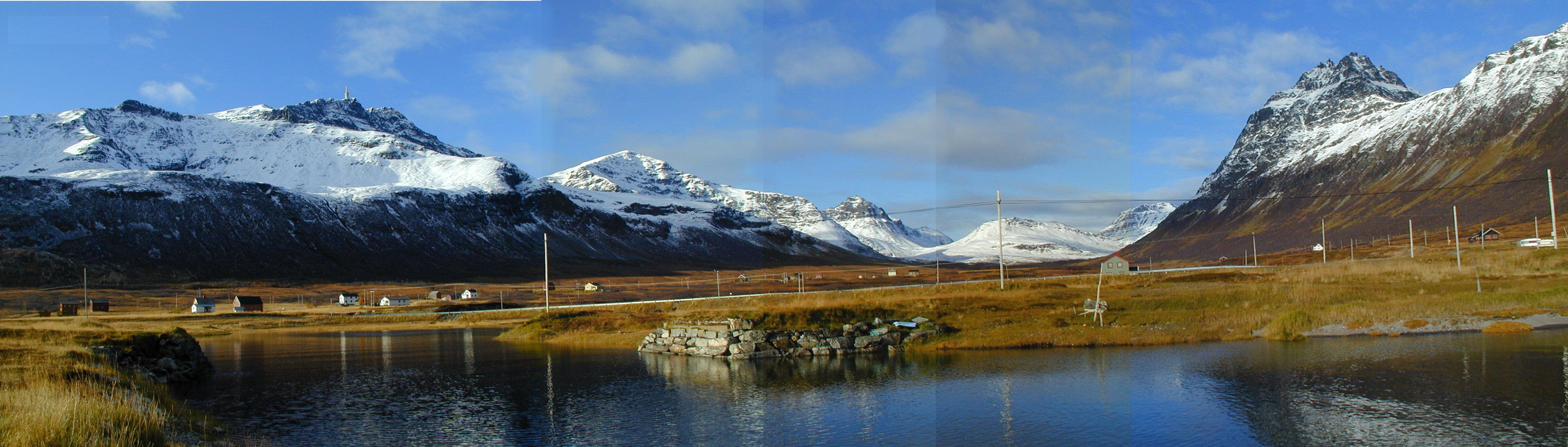
Panorama Akkarvik in Skjervøy, Troms county, Norway. The picture is viewed from the Storelva river with the mountains of Trolltinden to the left and Lappeguden to the right.
