= Arnøy Church =

- Arnøy kirke
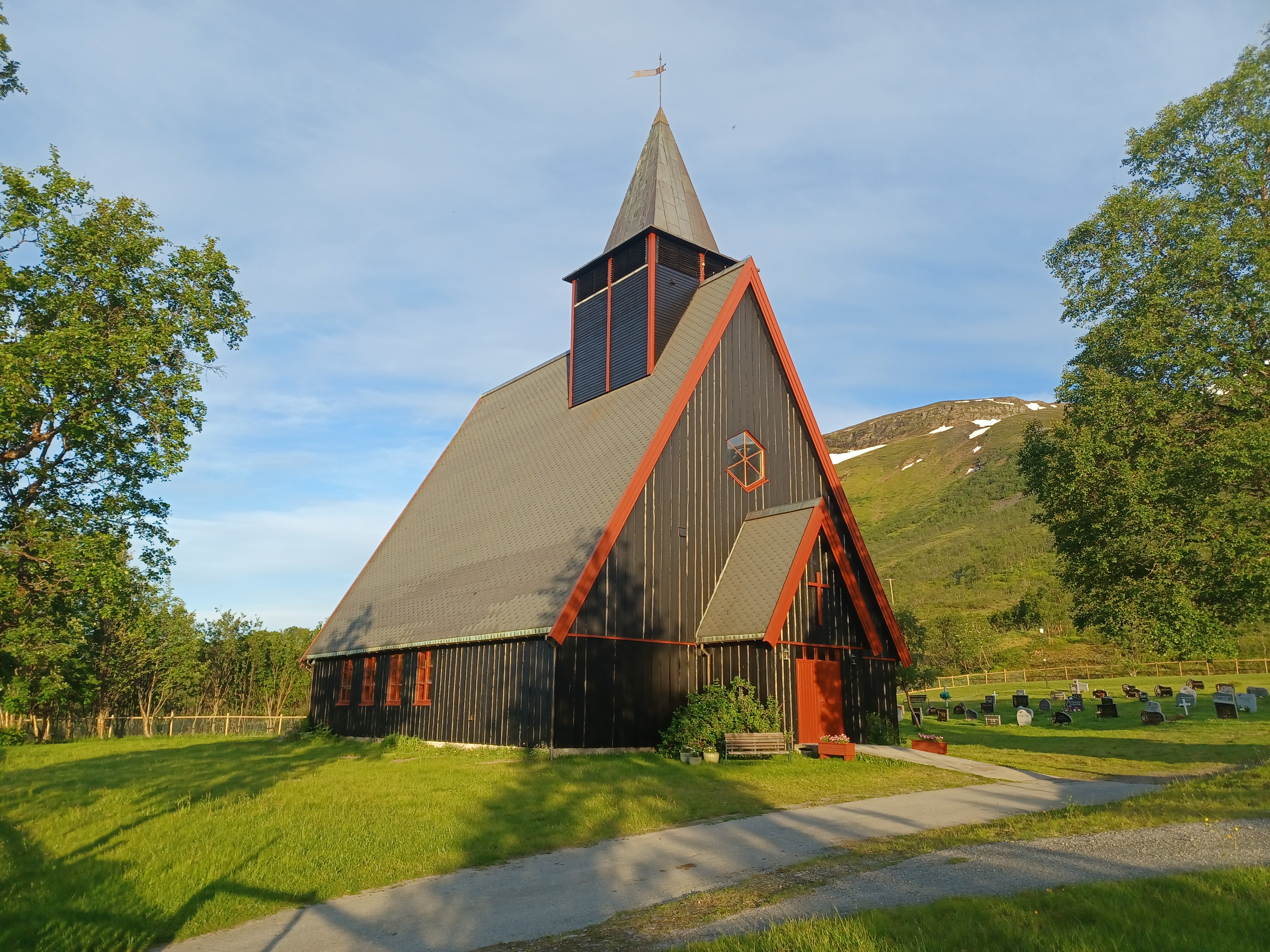
- View of the church
- Arnøy Church
- 70.050304°N 20.629306°E
- Location: Skjervøy Municipality, Troms
- Country: Norway
- Denomination: Church of Norway
- Churchmanship: Evangelical Lutheran

History
- Former name: Arnøyhamn kapell
- Status: Parish church
- Founded: 1978
- Consecrated: 1978

Architecture
- Functional status: Active
- Architect: Harry Gangvik
- Architectural type: Long church
- Completed: 1978 (48 years ago)

Specifications
- Capacity: 250
- Materials: Wood

Administration
- Diocese: Nord-Hålogaland
- Deanery: Nord-Troms prosti
- Parish: Skjervøy

Arnøy Church (Norwegian: Arnøy kirke) is a parish church of the Church of Norway in Skjervøy Municipality in Troms county, Norway. It is located in the village of Arnøyhamn on the island of Arnøya. It is one of the two churches for the Skjervøy parish which is part of the Nord-Troms prosti (deanery) in the Diocese of Nord-Hålogaland. The brown, wooden church was built in a long church style in 1978 using plans drawn up by the architect Harry Gangvik. The church seats about 250 people.

== See also ==
- List of churches in Nord-Hålogaland
