= Arnøyhamn =

- Village
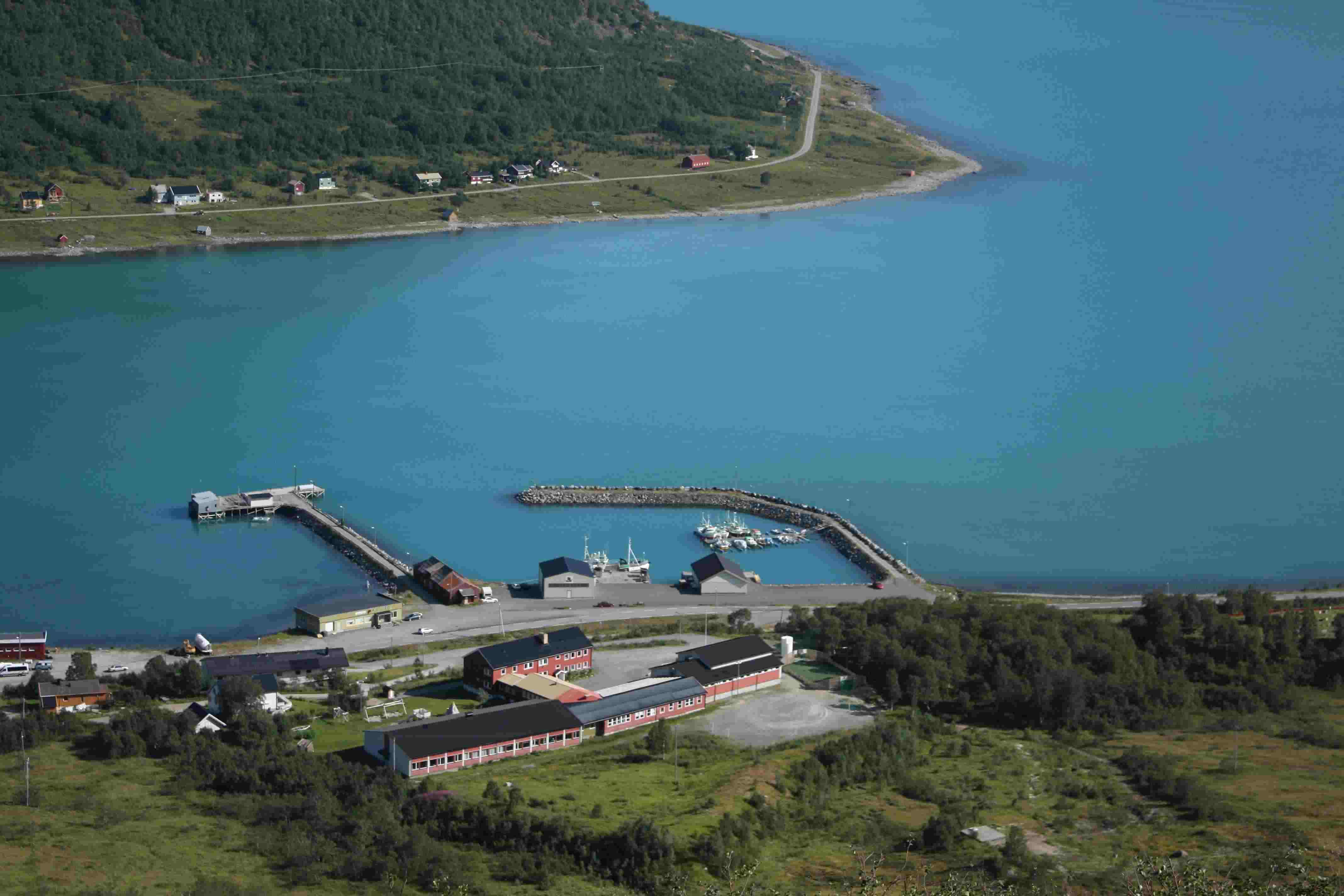
- View of the village harbor
- Interactive map of Arnøyhamn
- Location within Troms Location within Norway
- Coordinates: 70°03′09″N 20°37′56″E
- Country: Norway
- Region: Northern Norway
- County: Troms
- District: Nord-Troms
- Municipality: Skjervøy Municipality
- Elevation: 4 m (13 ft)
- Time zone: UTC+01:00 (CET)
  - Summer (DST): UTC+02:00 (CEST)
- Post Code: 9192 Arnøyhamn

Arnøyhamn is a village in Skjervøy Municipality in Troms county, Norway. The village is located on the southern shore of the island of Arnøya. The village is about 5 kilometres (3.1 mi) east of the village of Akkarvik. Arnøy Church is located in this village.
