= Skjervøy Church =

- Skjervøy kirke
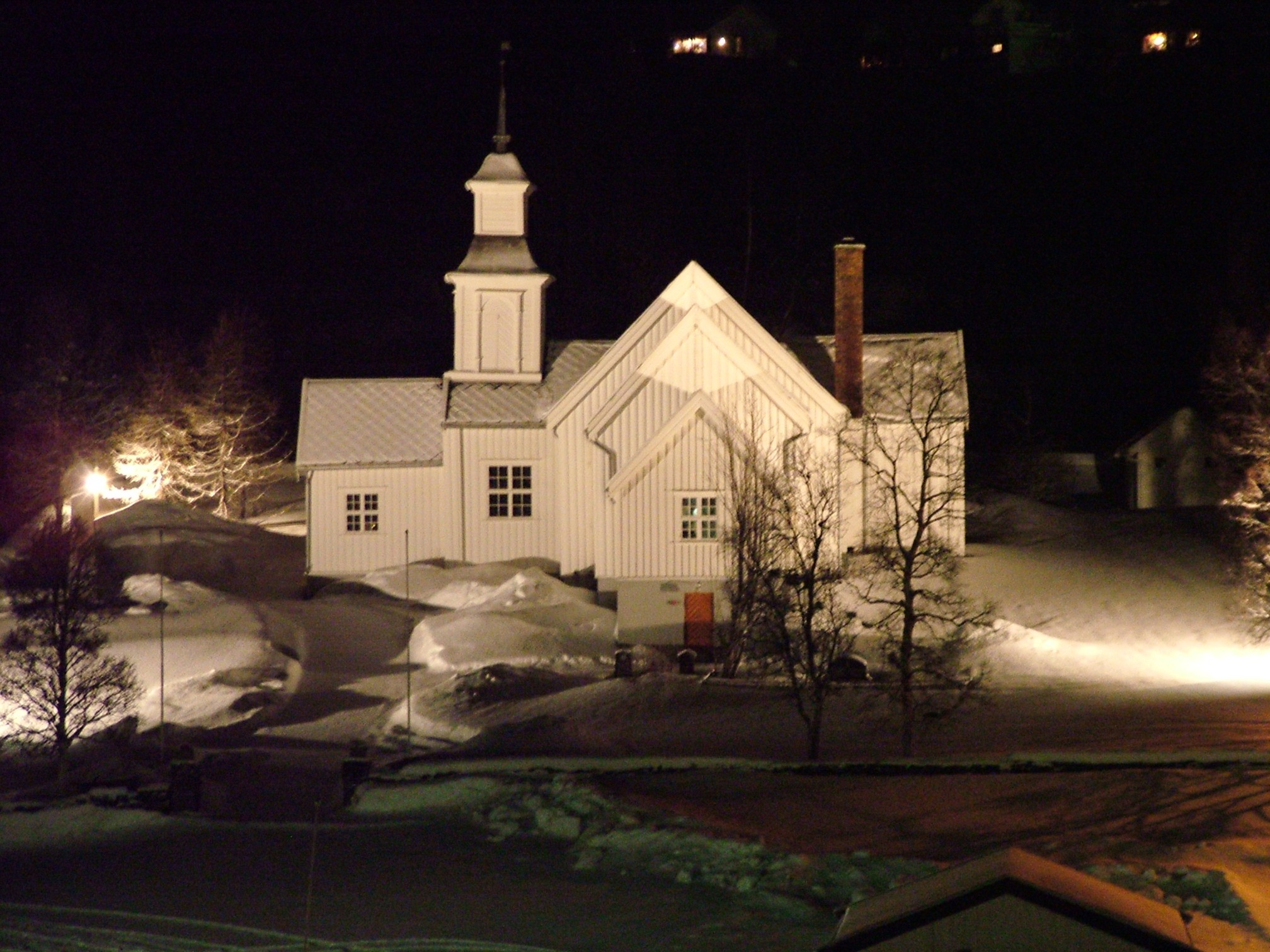
- View of the church
- Skjervøy Church
- 70.035885°N 20.977733°E
- Location: Skjervøy, Troms
- Country: Norway
- Denomination: Church of Norway
- Churchmanship: Evangelical Lutheran

History
- Status: Parish church
- Founded: c. 1500
- Consecrated: 1728

Architecture
- Functional status: Active
- Architect: Hans Michelsen
- Architectural type: Long church
- Completed: 1728 (298 years ago)

Specifications
- Capacity: 225
- Materials: Wood

Administration
- Diocese: Nord-Hålogaland
- Deanery: Nord-Troms prosti
- Parish: Skjervøy
- Norwegian Cultural Heritage Site
- Type: Church
- Status: Protected
- ID: 85462

Skjervøy Church (Norwegian: Skjervøy kirke) is a parish church of the Church of Norway in Skjervøy Municipality in Troms county, Norway. It is located in the village of village of Skjervøy on the island of Skjervøya. It is the main church for the Skjervøy parish which is part of the Nord-Troms prosti (deanery) in the Diocese of Nord-Hålogaland. The white, wooden church was built in 1728 to replace an older church building. It is the oldest preserved wooden church in the whole diocese, so it is a protected historic site. It was designed by the architect Hans Michelsen in a combination of the common long church style and cruciform style. The church seats about 225 people.

== History ==
The earliest existing historical records of the church date back to the year 1589, but the church was not new that year. Historically, the old church was located about 30 metres (98 ft) south of the present site of the church. In 1666, the building was described as being fairly new, so the old church must have been replaced around that time. The church was described as a small church with small windows and a dark-colored exterior.

The Sami missionary Thomas von Westen had a new church built here in 1728. He commissioned Hans Michelsen to build the church. The church was to serve the coastal Sami people and Kven people inhabiting the parish, which at that time encompassed most of Northern Troms county. In that time, attending church was required and if you were absent, you could be fined. Since the parish was so large, many small cabins were built near the shoreline by the church so that people could travel to the church on Saturday, stay over night there and then attend church on Sunday. This in effect made the churchyard a major community gathering center each week. In 1750, the church was described as a low, wooden, cruciform building with a slate roof and no tower. In 1777, a tower was added onto the building.

In 1814, this church served as an election church (Norwegian: valgkirke). Together with more than 300 other parish churches across Norway, it was a polling station for elections to the 1814 Norwegian Constituent Assembly which wrote the Constitution of Norway. This was Norway's first national elections. Each church parish was a constituency that elected people called "electors" who later met together in each county to elect the representatives for the assembly that was to meet in at Eidsvoll Manor later that year.

== Media gallery ==
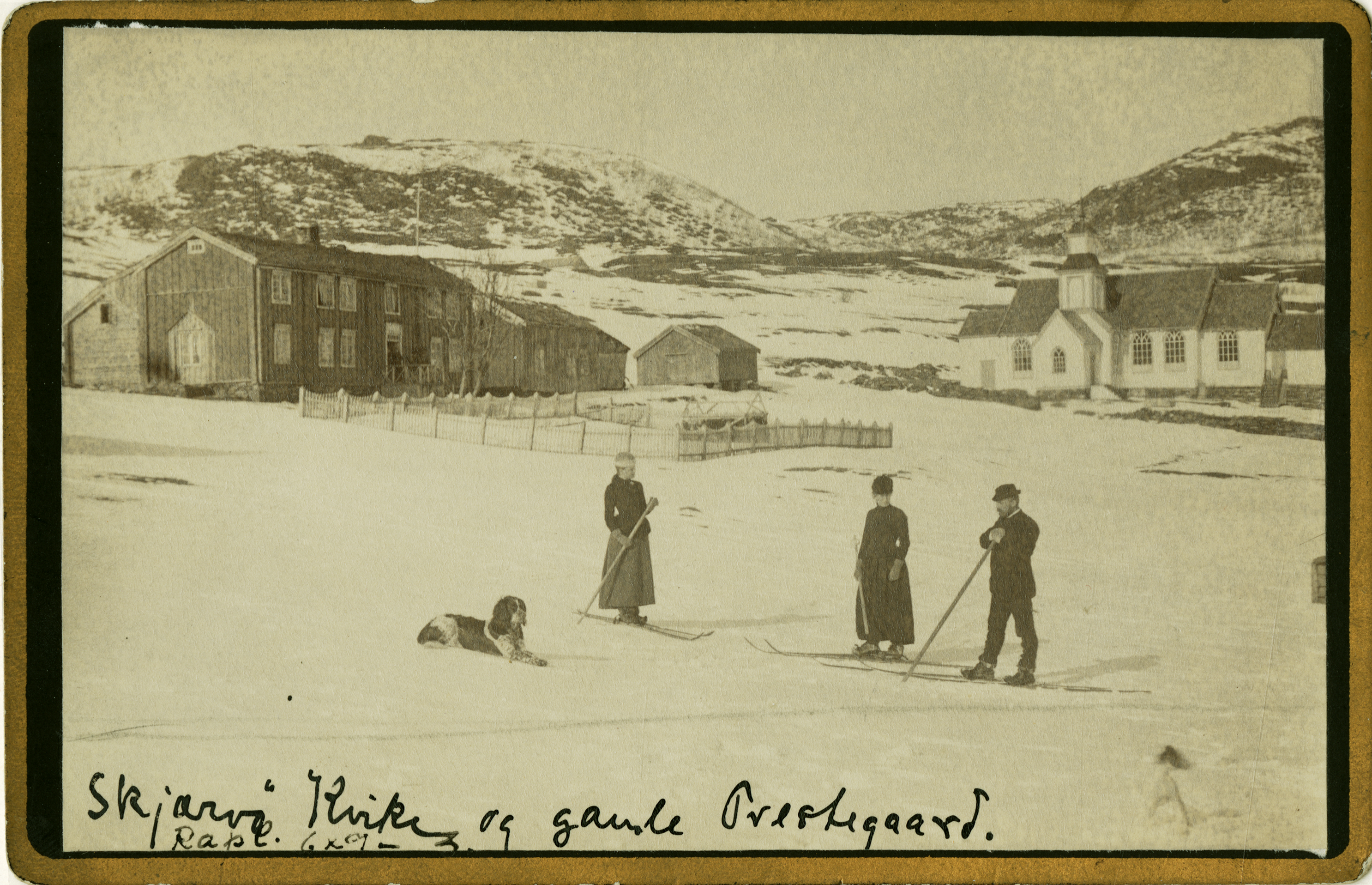

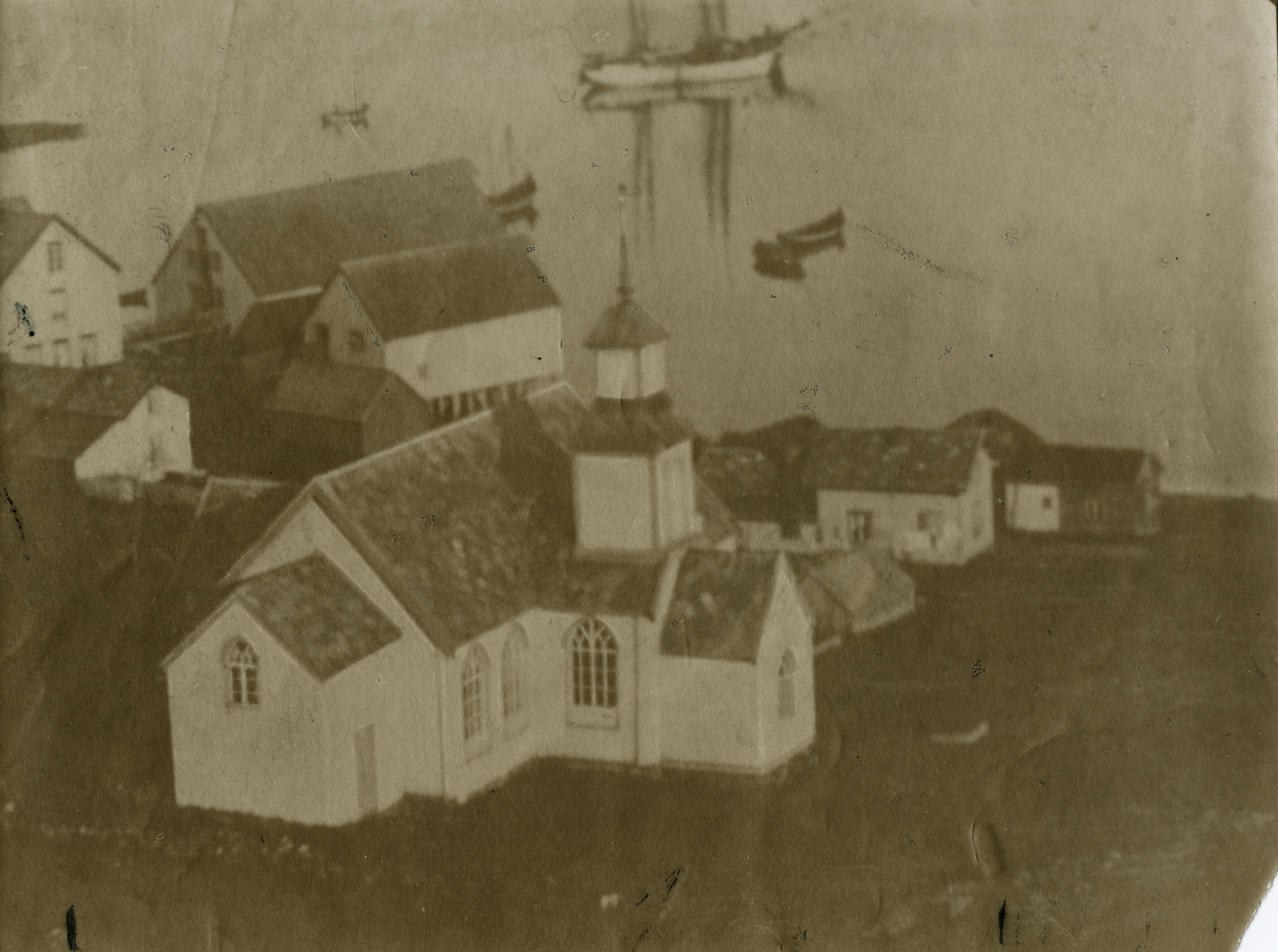

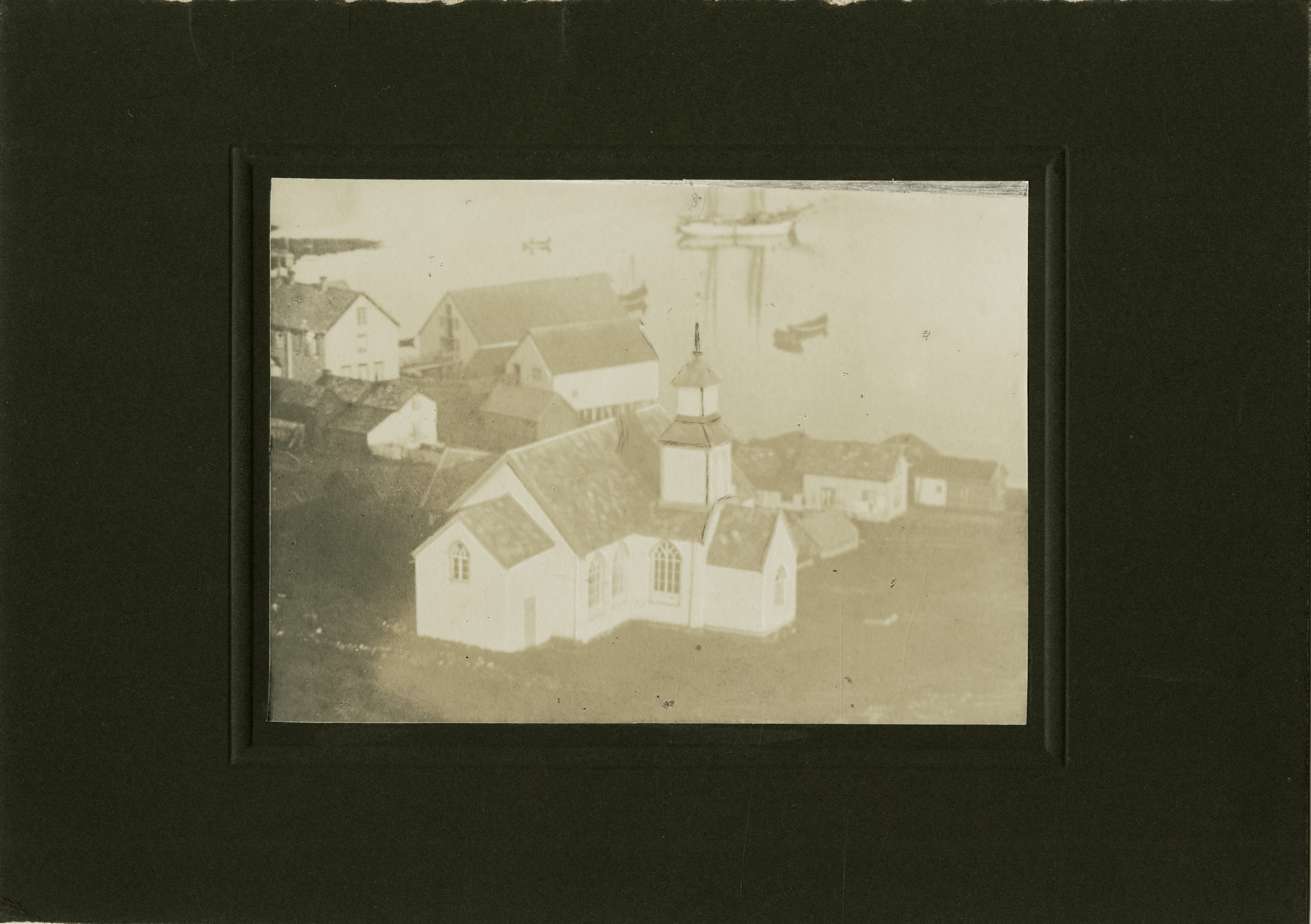

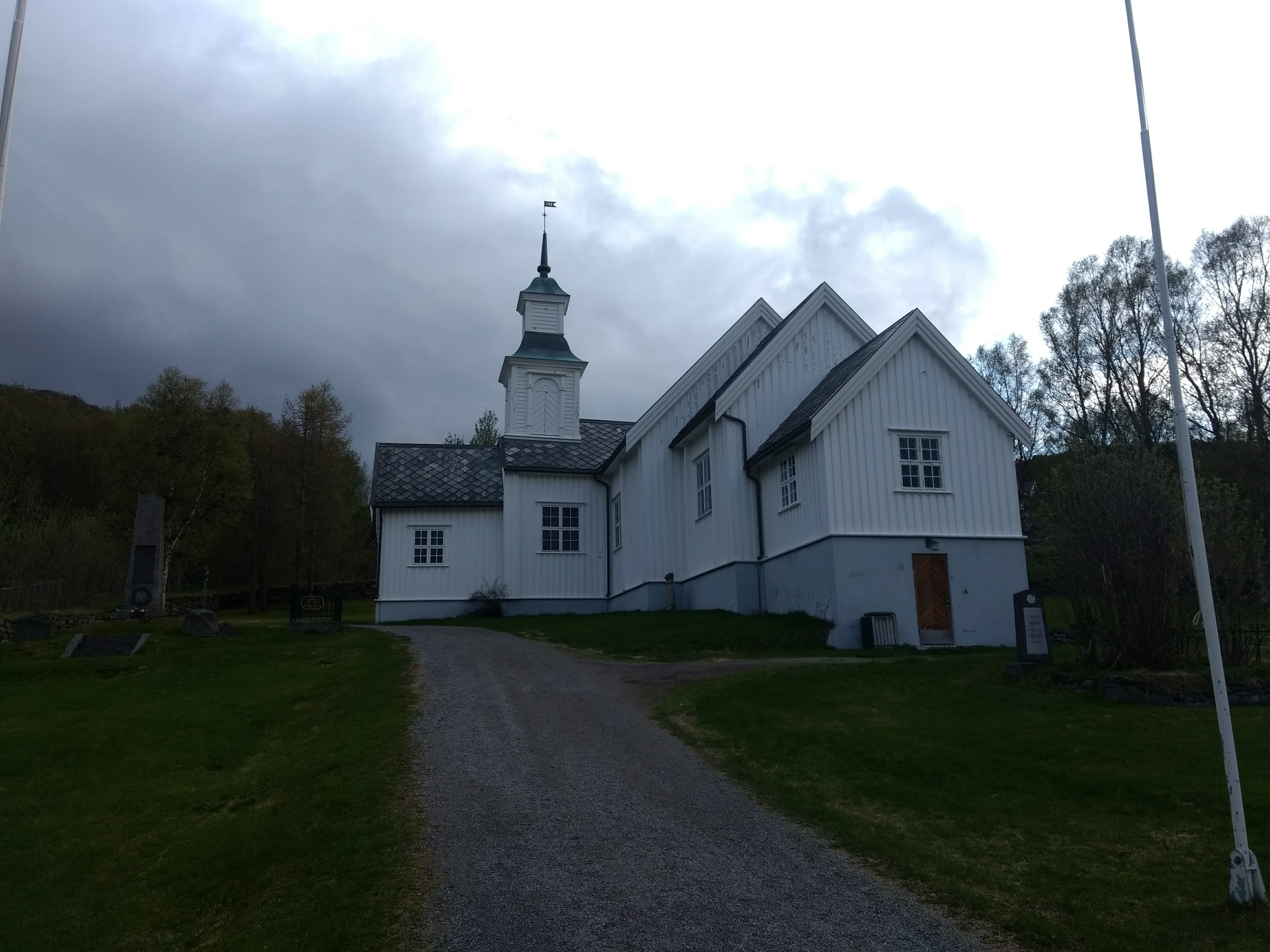

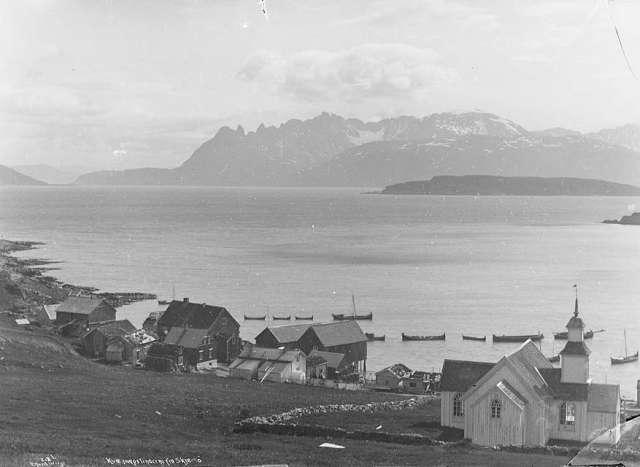

== See also ==
- List of churches in Nord-Hålogaland
