= Skjervøy (village) =

Skjervøy (Norwegian); Skiervá (Northern Sami); Kierua (Kven)
- Village
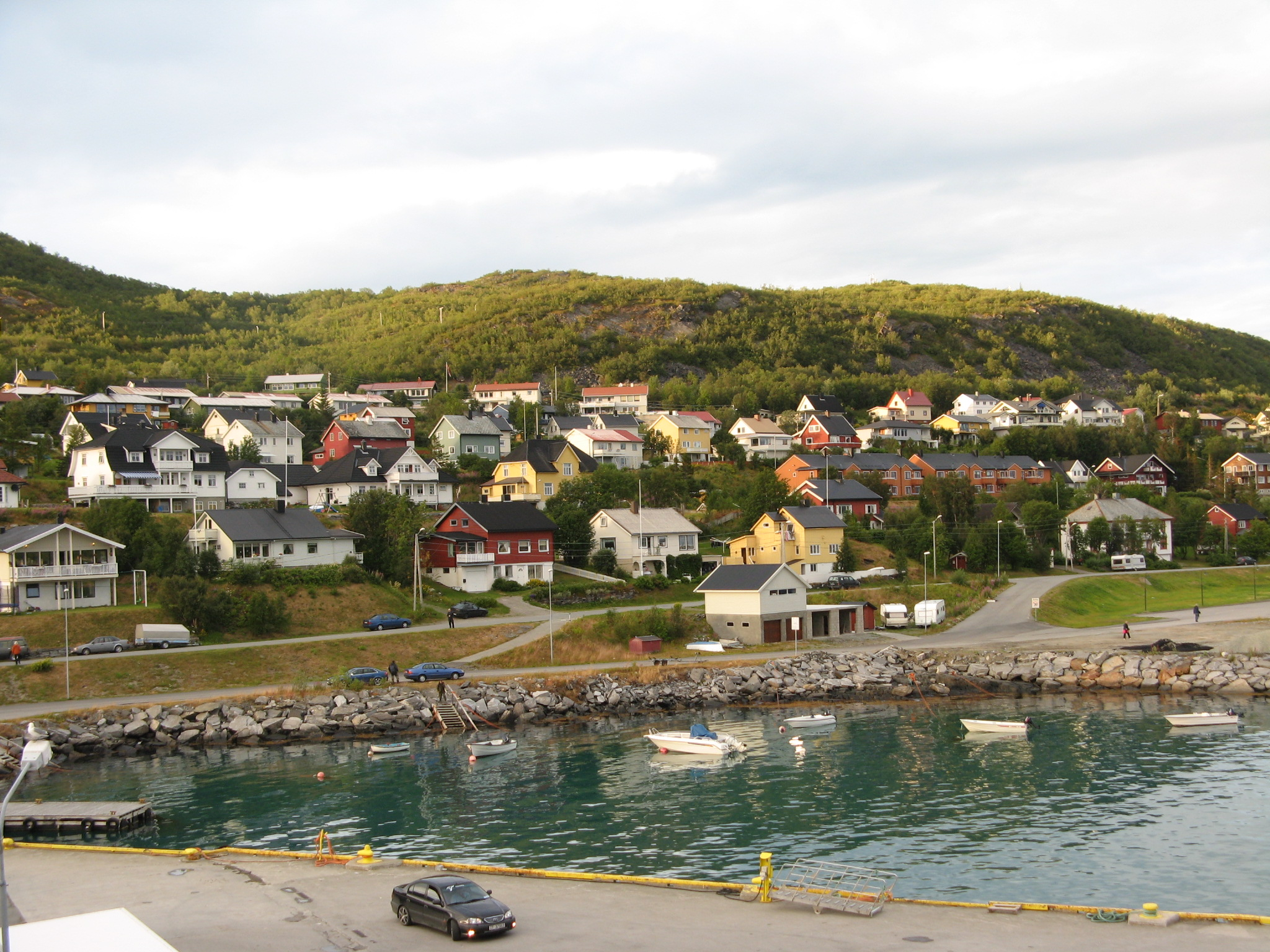
- View of the village
- Interactive map of: Skjervøy (Norwegian); Skiervá (Northern Sami); Kierua (Kven)
- Location within Troms Location within Norway
- Coordinates: 70°01′52″N 20°58′17″E
- Country: Norway
- Region: Northern Norway
- County: Troms
- District: Nord-Troms
- Municipality: Skjervøy Municipality

Area
  - Total: 1.34 km^{2} (0.52 sq mi)
- Elevation: 7 m (23 ft)

Population (2023)
  - Total: 2,437
  - Density: 1,819/km^{2} (4,710/sq mi)
- Time zone: UTC+01:00 (CET)
  - Summer (DST): UTC+02:00 (CEST)
- Post Code: 9180 Skjervøy

Skjervøy (Norwegian), Skiervá (Northern Sami), or Kierua (Kven) is the administrative centre in Skjervøy Municipality in Troms county, Norway. The village is located on the island of Skjervøya along the Kvænangen fjord, near the mouth of the Reisafjorden. The 1.34-square-kilometre (330-acre) village has a population (2023) of 2,437 which gives the village a population density of 1,819 inhabitants per square kilometre (4,710/sq mi).

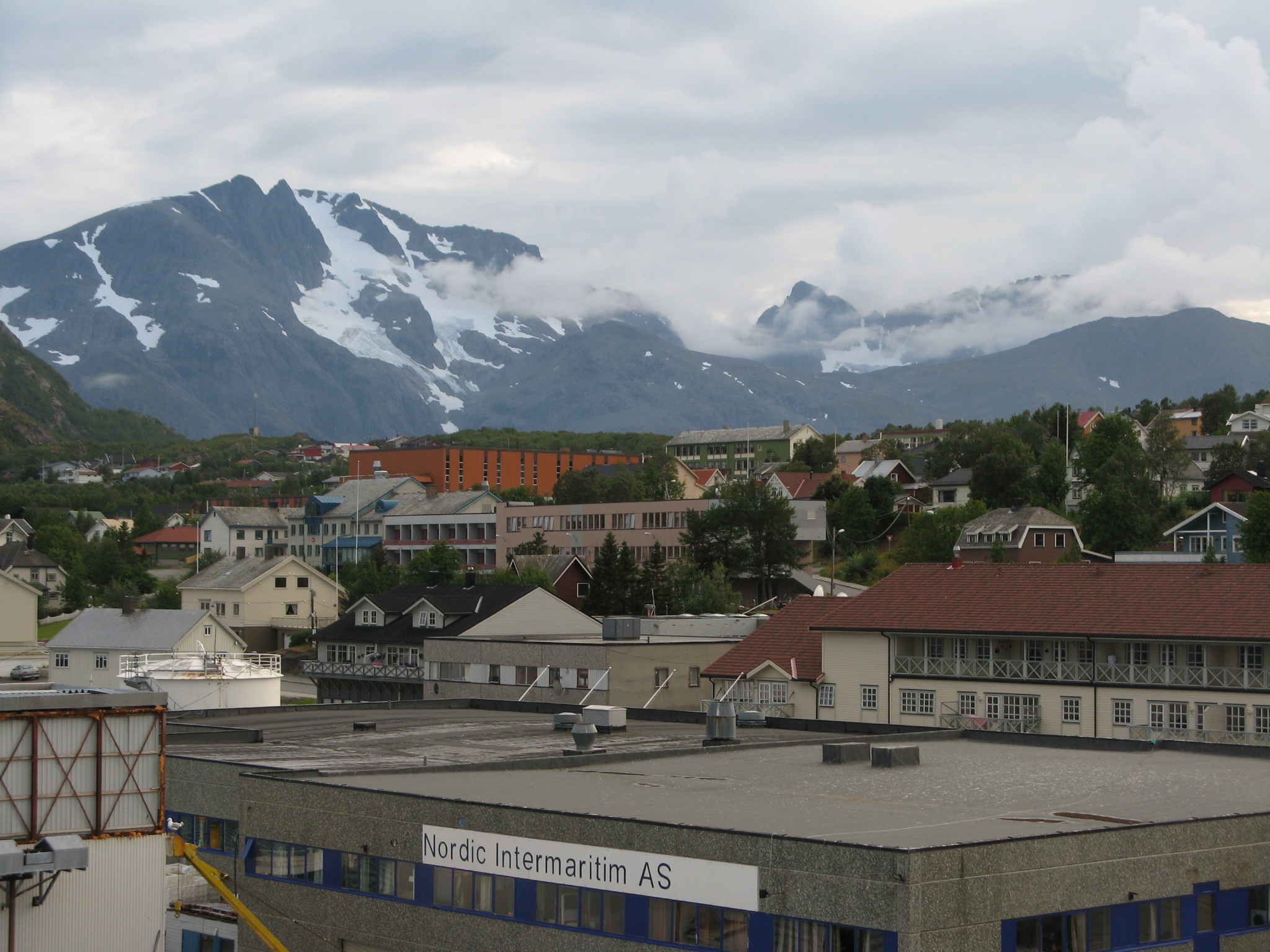
View of the village

The village's economy is based on the fishing industry. The Hurtigruten express boats regularly stop at the village port. The historic Skjervøy Church is also located in this village. The village is connected to the mainland by the Skattørsundet Bridge (which connects to Kågen island) and then the Maursund Tunnel (which connects Kågen to the mainland).
