= Skjervøy Bridge =

Skjervøy Bridge Skattørsundet Bridge Skjervøyabrua / Skattørsundet bru
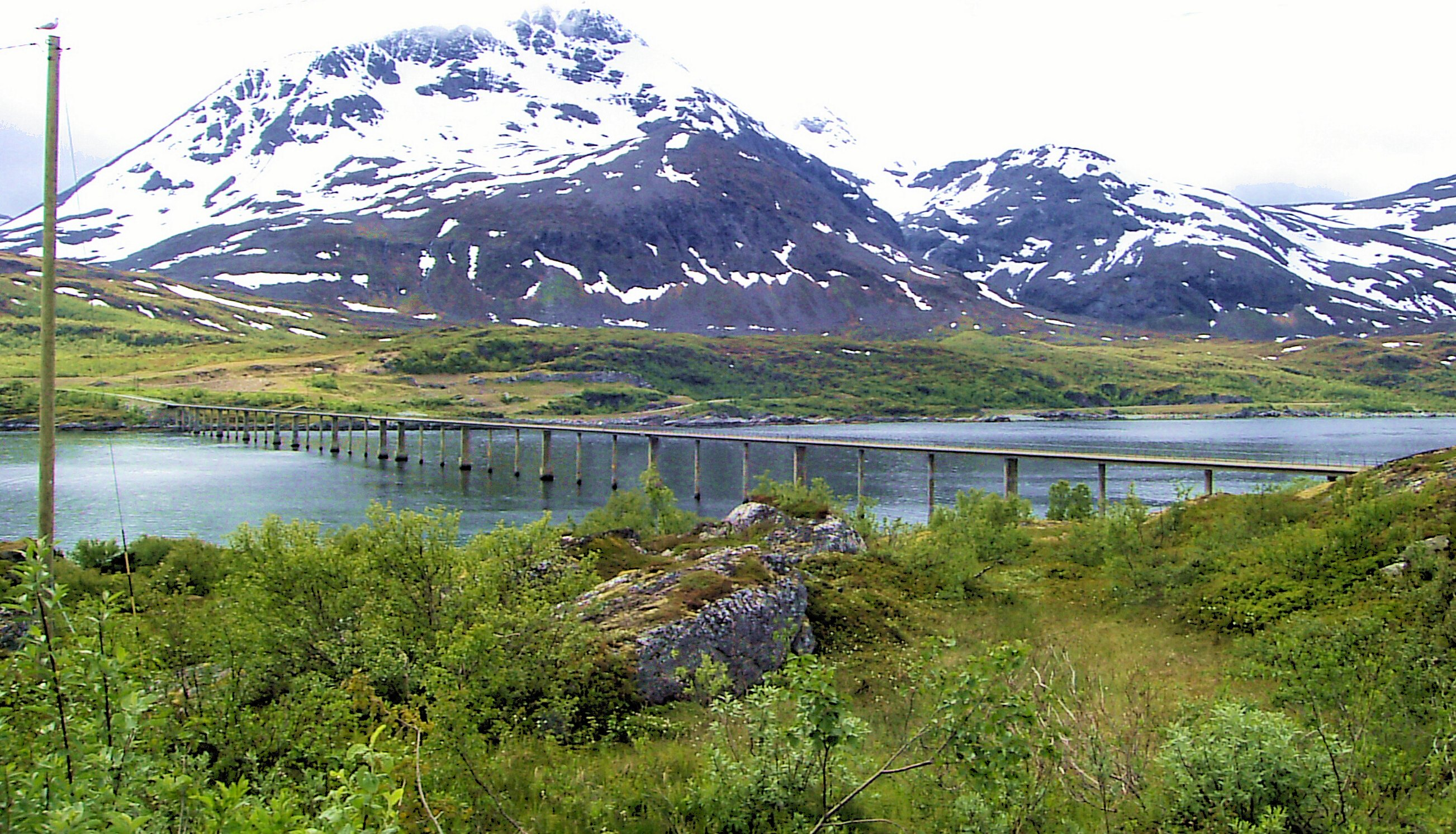
- Coordinates: 70°00′24″N 020°54′37″E
- Carries: Riksvei 866
- Crosses: Skattørsundet
- Locale: Skjervøy, Troms, Norway
- Official name: Skattørsundet Bridge

Characteristics
- Material: Beam bridge
- Total length: 804 m (2,638 ft)
- Longest span: 32 m (105 ft)
- No. of spans: 40

History
- Opened: 1971

The Skjervøy Bridge or Skattørsundet Bridge (Norwegian: Skjervøyabrua / Skattørsundet bru) is a beam bridge in Skjervøy Municipality that crosses the Skattørsundet strait between the islands of Kågen and Skjervøya in Troms county, Norway. The 804-metre-long (2,638 ft) bridge has 40 spans, the longest of which is 32 metres (105 ft). Skjervøy Bridge was opened in 1971. Together with the Maursund Tunnel, it connects the village of Skjervøy to the mainland.
