= Maursund Tunnel =

Undersea road tunnel in Troms, Norway

Maursund Tunnel Maursundtunnelen
- Interactive map of Maursund Tunnel; Maursundtunnelen

Overview
- Location: Troms, Norway
- Coordinates: 69.9261°N 20.9196°E
- Status: In use
- Route: Fv866
- Start: Hamneidet (mainland)
- End: Kågen (island)

Operation
- Opened: 6 July 1991
- Traffic: Automotive

Technical
- Length: 2,122 metres (6,962 ft)
- Min elevation: −92.5 metres (−303 ft)
- Grade: 10%

The Maursund Tunnel (Norwegian: Maursundtunnelen) is an undersea tunnel in Troms county, Norway. The tunnel goes under the Maursundet strait connecting the mainland part of Nordreisa Municipality with the island of Kågen in Skjervøy Municipality. The 2,122-metre (6,962 ft) long tunnel reaches a depth of 92.5 metres (303 ft) below sea level and has a 10% grade in some parts of the tunnel. The tunnel, which was opened in 1991, and the nearby Skattørsundet Bridge connect the large village of Skjervøy to the mainland.
