= Kågen =

Island in Skjervøy, Norway

Kågen (Norwegian) Gávvir (Northern Sami)
- Interactive map of Kågen (Norwegian); Gávvir (Northern Sami)

Geography
- Location: Troms, Norway
- Coordinates: 69.9833°N 20.8291°E
- Area: 85.7 km^{2} (33.1 sq mi)
- Area rank: 52nd in Norway
- Length: 12 km (7.5 mi)
- Width: 12.7 km (7.89 mi)
- Coastline: 50 km (31 mi)
- Highest elevation: 1,228 m (4029 ft)
- Highest point: Store Kågtinden

Administration
- Norway
- County: Troms
- Municipality: Skjervøy Municipality

Demographics
- Population: 27 (2001)
- Pop. density: 0.3/km^{2} (0.8/sq mi)

Kågen (Norwegian) or Gávvir (Northern Sami) is an island in Skjervøy Municipality in Troms county, Norway. The 85.7-square-kilometre (33.1 sq mi) island lies between the Kvænangen fjord (to the east) and the Lyngen fjord to the west. The island is home to 27 inhabitants (2001). The island is mountainous with several peaks over 1,000 metres (3,300 ft) above sea level. The highest point is the 1,228-metre (4,029 ft) tall mountain Store Kågtind. Kågen is the 52nd largest island in Norway.

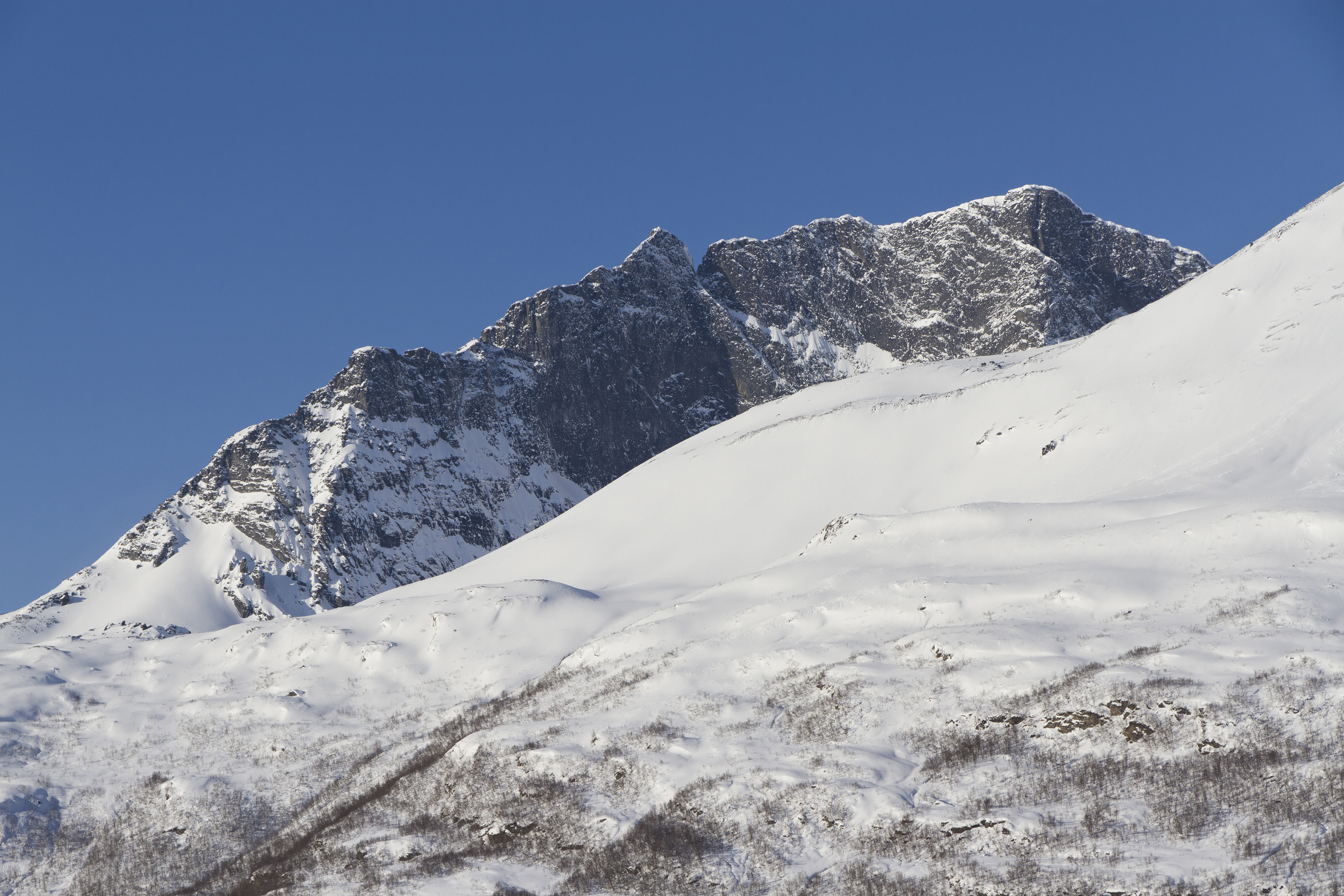
East face of Blåtinden (985 m) as seen from the south coast of Maursundet in 2012 March. The mountain is located in the island of Kågen in the municipality of Skjervøy, Troms, Norway.

There is a ferry connection with the neighboring islands of Arnøya and Laukøya to the north, the Skjervøy Bridge connects to the island Skjervøya to the east, and the undersea Maursund Tunnel connects the island to the mainland to the south.

== See also ==
- List of islands of Norway by area
- List of islands of Norway
