= Skjervøya =

Island in Skjervøy, Norway

Skjervøya (Norwegian); Skiervá (Northern Sami); Kierua (Kven)
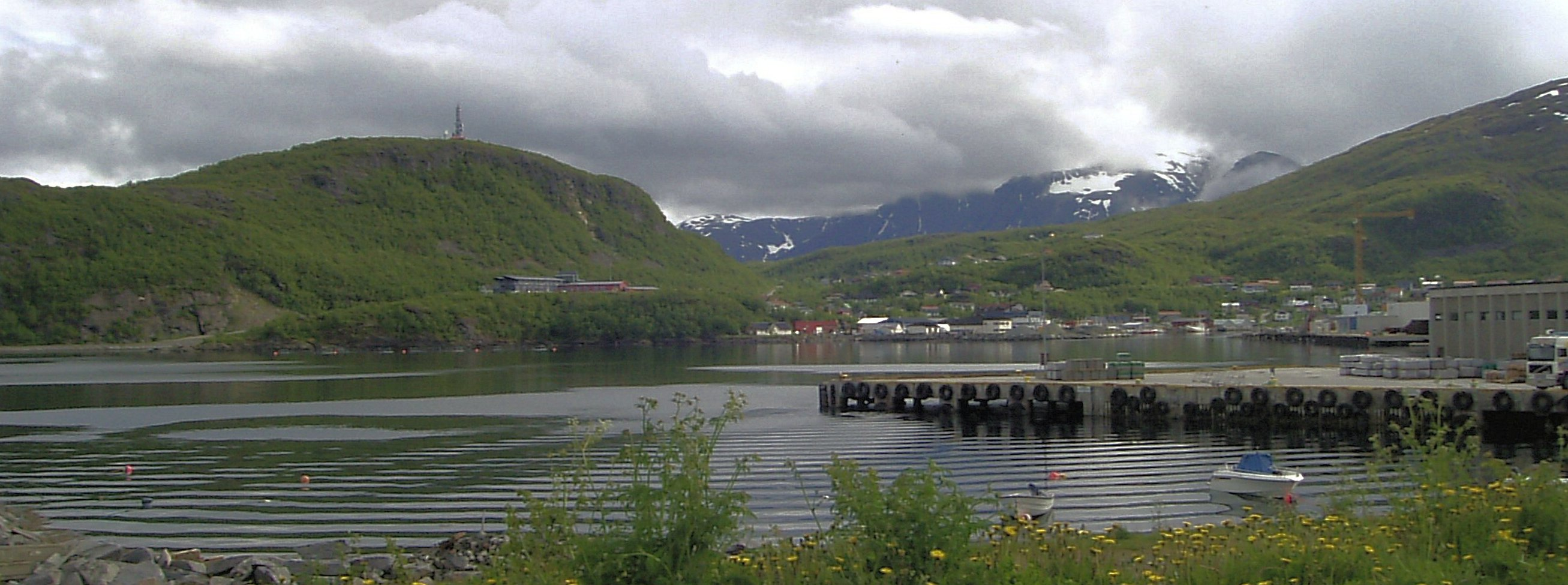
- View of the harbor on Skjervøya
- Interactive map of: Skjervøya (Norwegian); Skiervá (Northern Sami); Kierua (Kven)

Geography
- Location: Troms, Norway
- Coordinates: 70.0234°N 20.9546°E
- Area: 11.73 km^{2} (4.53 sq mi)
- Length: 7 km (4.3 mi)
- Width: 2.5 km (1.55 mi)
- Highest elevation: 345 m (1132 ft)
- Highest point: Skattørfjellet

Administration
- Norway
- County: Troms
- Municipality: Skjervøy Municipality

Skjervøya (Norwegian), Skiervá (Northern Sami), or Kierua (Kven) is an island in Skjervøy Municipality in Troms county, Norway. The 11.7-square-kilometre (4.5 sq mi) island lies to the east of the island of Kågen and south of the island of Laukøya. The Kvænangen fjord lies to the east of the island. The village of Skjervøy is the main population centre on the island (and it is the administrative centre of the whole municipality). Fishing is one of the main industries on the island. Skjervøya is connected to the mainland by a bridge and then a tunnel. The Skjervøy Bridge connects the island to Kågen island to the west. The undersea Maursund Tunnel then connects Kågen to the mainland.

== See also ==
- List of islands of Norway by area
- List of islands of Norway
