= Skjervøy Municipality =

Municipality in Troms, Norway

Skjervøy Municipality Skjervøy kommune Skiervvá suohkan (Northern Sami) Kieruan komuuni (Kven)
- Municipality
- Skjervø herred (historic name)
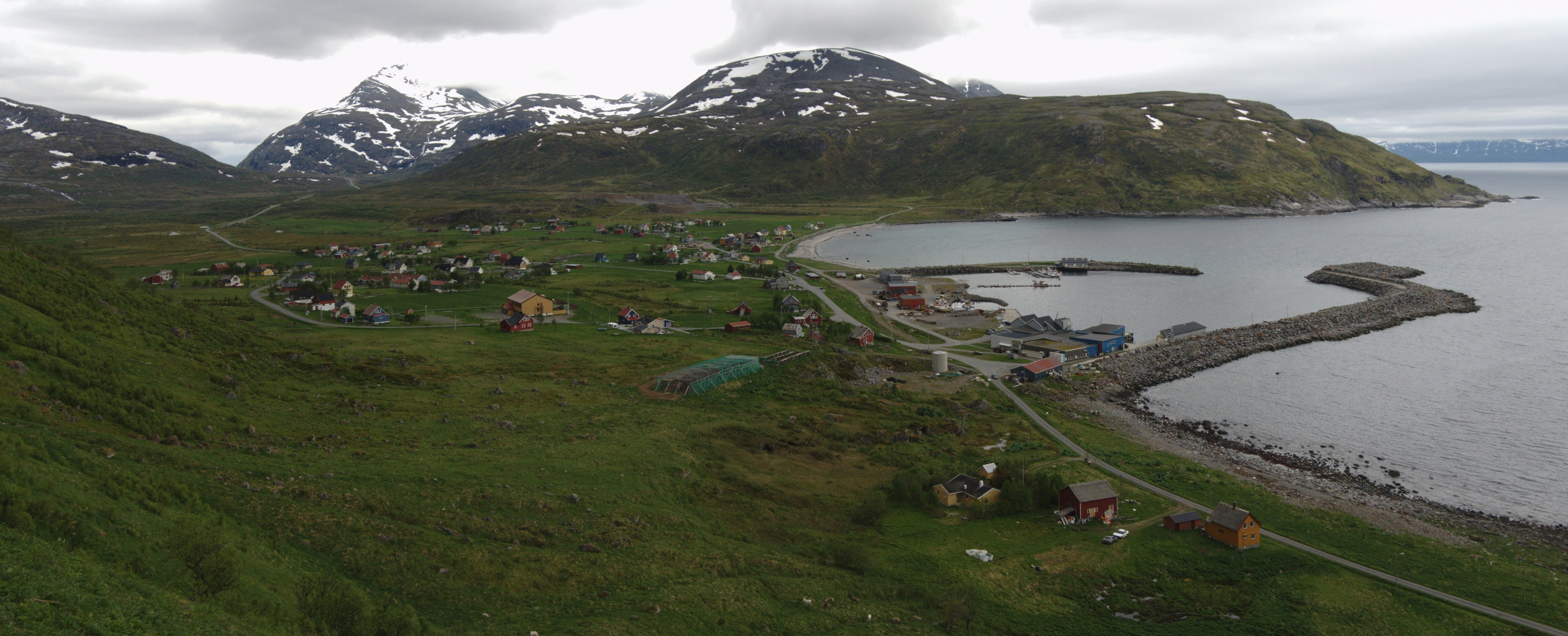
- View of the village of Årviksand

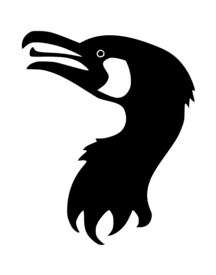
- Flag Coat of arms

- Troms within Norway

- Skjervøy within Troms
- Coordinates: 70°05′07″N 20°39′34″E
- Country: Norway
- County: Troms
- District: Nord-Troms
- Established: 1 Jan 1838
  - Created as: Formannskapsdistrikt
- Administrative centre: Skjervøy

Government
  - Mayor (2015): Ørjan Albrigtsen (KrF)

Area
  - Total: 474.00 km^{2} (183.01 sq mi)
  - Land: 465.33 km^{2} (179.66 sq mi)
  - Water: 8.67 km^{2} (3.35 sq mi) 1.8%
  - Rank: #211 in Norway
- Highest elevation: 1,229.58 m (4,034.1 ft)

Population (2024)
  - Total: 2,794
  - Rank: #240 in Norway
  - Density: 5.9/km^{2} (15/sq mi)
  - Change (10 years): ▼ −3%
- Demonym: Skjervøyværing

Official language
  - Norwegian form: Bokmål
- Time zone: UTC+01:00 (CET)
  - Summer (DST): UTC+02:00 (CEST)
- ISO 3166 code: NO-5542
- Website: Official website

Skjervøy Municipality (Norwegian: Skjervøy kommune, Northern Sami: Skiervvá suohkan; Kven: Kieruan komuuni) is a municipality in Troms county, Norway. The administrative centre of the municipality is the town of Skjervøy on the island of Skjervøya, where most of the inhabitants live. The main industries are fishing, processing of fish and salmon farming. Tourism is an emerging industry. Other villages in the municipality include Akkarvik and Arnøyhamn.

The 474-square-kilometre (183 sq mi) municipality is the 211th largest by area out of the 357 municipalities in Norway. Skjervøy is the 240th most populous municipality in Norway with a population of 2,794. The municipality's population density is 5.9 inhabitants per square kilometre (15/sq mi) and its population has decreased by 3% over the previous 10-year period.

== General information ==
The large municipality of Skjervøe (later spelled Skjervøy) was established on 1 January 1838 (see formannskapsdistrikt law). In 1863, the southeastern (inland) part of the municipality (population: 1,677) was separated to form the new Kvænangen Municipality. This left 2,785 people in Skjervøy. Then on 1 January 1886, the southern part of the municipality (population: 1,057) was separated from Skjervøy to form the new Nordreisa Municipality. This left 2,096 inhabitants in Skjervøy Municipality.

On 1 January 1890, the Trætten and Loppevolden farms (population: 32) were transferred from Skjervøy Municipality to Nordreisa Municipality. On 1 January 1965, the Meilands area (population: 12) was transferred to Kvænangen Municipality. On 1 January 1972, the southern part of the island of Uløya and most of Skjervøy Municipality located on the mainland (population: 1,556) were all transferred from Skjervøy Municipality to Nordreisa Municipality. Also on that date, the uninhabited Mannskarvik farm was transferred from Skjervøy Municipality to Kvænangen Municipality. Then on 1 January 1982, the Hamneidet area on the mainland (population: 128) was transferred from Skjervøy Municipality to Nordreisa Municipality. After this, Skjervøy Municipality only included land on islands and nothing on the mainland.

On 1 January 2020, the municipality became part of the newly formed Troms og Finnmark county. Previously, it had been part of the old Troms county. On 1 January 2024, the Troms og Finnmark county was divided and the municipality once again became part of Troms county.

=== Name ===
The municipality (originally the parish) is named after the small island of Skjervøya (Old Norse: Skerføy) since the first Skjervøy Church was built there. The first element is skerf which means "rocky ground". The last element is øy which means "island". Historically, the name of the municipality was spelled Skjervøe or Skjervø. On 6 January 1908, a royal resolution changed the spelling of the name of the municipality to Skjervøy.

=== Coat of arms ===
The coat of arms was granted on 27 March 1987. The official blazon is "Argent, a cormorant head erased sable" (Norwegian: I sølv et svart skarvehode). This means the arms have a field (background) with a tincture of argent which means it is commonly colored white, but if it is made out of metal, then silver is used. The charge is the head of a cormorant which has a tincture of sable. The arms are partly canting since the Norwegian word skarf means cormorant and that word is similar to the name Skjervøy. The cormorant also symbolizes the coastal municipality, which (like the bird) is dependent on fishing for its living. The cormorant is also a common bird in the area. The arms were designed by Kåre Bondesen and Jan Roald Andreassen.

=== Churches ===
The Church of Norway has one parish (sokn) within Skjervøy Municipality. It is part of the Nord-Troms prosti (deanery) in the Diocese of Nord-Hålogaland.

Churches in Skjervøy Municipality
Parish (sokn)	Church name	Location of the church	Year built
Skjervøy	Arnøy Church	Arnøyhamn	1978
Skjervøy	Skjervøy Church	Skjervøy	1728

== History ==
Skjervøy Church dates back to 1728 and it is the oldest wooden church in Troms county. The village of Maursund is an old trading post with well-preserved 19th-century houses.

== Government ==
Skjervøy Municipality is responsible for primary education (through 10th grade), outpatient health services, senior citizen services, welfare and other social services, zoning, economic development, and municipal roads and utilities. The municipality is governed by a municipal council of directly elected representatives. The mayor is indirectly elected by a vote of the municipal council. The municipality is under the jurisdiction of the Nord-Troms og Senja District Court and the Hålogaland Court of Appeal.

=== Municipal council ===
The municipal council (Kommunestyre) of Skjervøy Municipality is made up of 19 representatives that are elected to four year terms. The tables below show the current and historical composition of the council by political party.

Skjervøy kommunestyre 2023–2027
Party name (in Norwegian)	Number of representatives
Labour Party (Arbeiderpartiet)	2
Progress Party (Fremskrittspartiet)	5
Conservative Party (Høyre)	1
Christian Democratic Party (Kristelig Folkeparti)	6
Red Party (Rødt)	1
Centre Party (Senterpartiet)	3
Socialist Left Party (Sosialistisk Venstreparti)	1
Total number of members:	19

Skjervøy kommunestyre 2019–2023
Party name (in Norwegian)	Number of representatives
Labour Party (Arbeiderpartiet)	2
Progress Party (Fremskrittspartiet)	3
Conservative Party (Høyre)	1
Christian Democratic Party (Kristelig Folkeparti)	6
Centre Party (Senterpartiet)	5
Joint list of the Red Party (Rødt) and the Socialist Left Party (Sosialistisk Venstreparti)	2
Total number of members:	19

Skjervøy kommunestyre 2015–2019
Party name (in Norwegian)	Number of representatives
Labour Party (Arbeiderpartiet)	4
Progress Party (Fremskrittspartiet)	3
Conservative Party (Høyre)	1
Centre Party (Senterpartiet)	4
Socialist Left Party (Sosialistisk Venstreparti)	2
Joint list of the Christian Democratic Party (Kristelig Folkeparti) and the Coastal Party (Kystpartiet)	5
Total number of members:	19

Skjervøy kommunestyre 2011–2015
Party name (in Norwegian)	Number of representatives
Labour Party (Arbeiderpartiet)	3
Progress Party (Fremskrittspartiet)	2
Conservative Party (Høyre)	2
Christian Democratic Party (Kristelig Folkeparti)	1
Coastal Party (Kystpartiet)	7
Centre Party (Senterpartiet)	2
Socialist Left Party (Sosialistisk Venstreparti)	2
Total number of members:	19

Skjervøy kommunestyre 2007–2011
Party name (in Norwegian)	Number of representatives
Labour Party (Arbeiderpartiet)	3
Progress Party (Fremskrittspartiet)	3
Conservative Party (Høyre)	1
Christian Democratic Party (Kristelig Folkeparti)	1
Coastal Party (Kystpartiet)	7
Centre Party (Senterpartiet)	2
Socialist Left Party (Sosialistisk Venstreparti)	2
Total number of members:	19

Skjervøy kommunestyre 2003–2007
Party name (in Norwegian)	Number of representatives
Labour Party (Arbeiderpartiet)	4
Progress Party (Fremskrittspartiet)	2
Conservative Party (Høyre)	1
Christian Democratic Party (Kristelig Folkeparti)	7
Centre Party (Senterpartiet)	2
Socialist Left Party (Sosialistisk Venstreparti)	3
Total number of members:	19

Skjervøy kommunestyre 1999–2003
Party name (in Norwegian)	Number of representatives
Labour Party (Arbeiderpartiet)	4
Conservative Party (Høyre)	3
Christian Democratic Party (Kristelig Folkeparti)	14
Centre Party (Senterpartiet)	1
Socialist Left Party (Sosialistisk Venstreparti)	3
Total number of members:	25

Skjervøy kommunestyre 1995–1999
Party name (in Norwegian)	Number of representatives
Labour Party (Arbeiderpartiet)	12
Conservative Party (Høyre)	9
Christian Democratic Party (Kristelig Folkeparti)	6
Centre Party (Senterpartiet)	2
Socialist Left Party (Sosialistisk Venstreparti)	3
Total number of members:	25

Skjervøy kommunestyre 1991–1995
Party name (in Norwegian)	Number of representatives
Labour Party (Arbeiderpartiet)	5
Conservative Party (Høyre)	8
Christian Democratic Party (Kristelig Folkeparti)	5
Centre Party (Senterpartiet)	3
Socialist Left Party (Sosialistisk Venstreparti)	4
Total number of members:	25

Skjervøy kommunestyre 1987–1991
Party name (in Norwegian)	Number of representatives
Labour Party (Arbeiderpartiet)	9
Conservative Party (Høyre)	6
Christian Democratic Party (Kristelig Folkeparti)	4
Centre Party (Senterpartiet)	2
Socialist Left Party (Sosialistisk Venstreparti)	2
Liberal Party (Venstre)	2
Total number of members:	25

Skjervøy kommunestyre 1983–1987
Party name (in Norwegian)	Number of representatives
Labour Party (Arbeiderpartiet)	11
Conservative Party (Høyre)	6
Christian Democratic Party (Kristelig Folkeparti)	4
Centre Party (Senterpartiet)	2
Socialist Left Party (Sosialistisk Venstreparti)	1
Liberal Party (Venstre)	1
Total number of members:	25

Skjervøy kommunestyre 1979–1983
Party name (in Norwegian)	Number of representatives
Labour Party (Arbeiderpartiet)	9
Conservative Party (Høyre)	4
Christian Democratic Party (Kristelig Folkeparti)	4
Centre Party (Senterpartiet)	3
Socialist Left Party (Sosialistisk Venstreparti)	1
Liberal Party (Venstre)	4
Total number of members:	25

Skjervøy kommunestyre 1975–1979
Party name (in Norwegian)	Number of representatives
Labour Party (Arbeiderpartiet)	11
Conservative Party (Høyre)	2
Christian Democratic Party (Kristelig Folkeparti)	4
Centre Party (Senterpartiet)	4
Socialist Left Party (Sosialistisk Venstreparti)	1
Liberal Party (Venstre)	3
Total number of members:	25

Skjervøy kommunestyre 1971–1975
Party name (in Norwegian)	Number of representatives
Labour Party (Arbeiderpartiet)	13
Conservative Party (Høyre)	2
Centre Party (Senterpartiet)	5
Liberal Party (Venstre)	5
Total number of members:	25

Skjervøy kommunestyre 1967–1971
Party name (in Norwegian)	Number of representatives
Labour Party (Arbeiderpartiet)	18
Conservative Party (Høyre)	3
Socialist People's Party (Sosialistisk Folkeparti)	1
Liberal Party (Venstre)	7
Local List(s) (Lokale lister)	2
Total number of members:	31

Skjervøy kommunestyre 1963–1967
Party name (in Norwegian)	Number of representatives
Labour Party (Arbeiderpartiet)	17
Conservative Party (Høyre)	4
List of workers, fishermen, and small farmholders (Arbeidere, fiskere, småbrukere liste)	4
Joint List(s) of Non-Socialist Parties (Borgerlige Felleslister)	6
Total number of members:	31

Skjervøy herredsstyre 1959–1963
Party name (in Norwegian)	Number of representatives
Labour Party (Arbeiderpartiet)	16
Communist Party (Kommunistiske Parti)	2
List of workers, fishermen, and small farmholders (Arbeidere, fiskere, småbrukere liste)	7
Joint List(s) of Non-Socialist Parties (Borgerlige Felleslister)	6
Total number of members:	31

Skjervøy herredsstyre 1955–1959
Party name (in Norwegian)	Number of representatives
Labour Party (Arbeiderpartiet)	16
Communist Party (Kommunistiske Parti)	2
List of workers, fishermen, and small farmholders (Arbeidere, fiskere, småbrukere liste)	9
Joint List(s) of Non-Socialist Parties (Borgerlige Felleslister)	4
Total number of members:	31

Skjervøy herredsstyre 1951–1955
Party name (in Norwegian)	Number of representatives
Labour Party (Arbeiderpartiet)	12
Joint List(s) of Non-Socialist Parties (Borgerlige Felleslister)	2
Local List(s) (Lokale lister)	6
Total number of members:	20

Skjervøy herredsstyre 1947–1951
Party name (in Norwegian)	Number of representatives
Labour Party (Arbeiderpartiet)	12
Joint List(s) of Non-Socialist Parties (Borgerlige Felleslister)	7
Local List(s) (Lokale lister)	1
Total number of members:	20

Skjervøy herredsstyre 1945–1947
Party name (in Norwegian)	Number of representatives
Labour Party (Arbeiderpartiet)	13
Local List(s) (Lokale lister)	7
Total number of members:	20

Skjervøy herredsstyre 1937–1941*
Party name (in Norwegian)	Number of representatives
Labour Party (Arbeiderpartiet)	9
List of workers, fishermen, and small farmholders (Arbeidere, fiskere, småbrukere liste)	9
Local List(s) (Lokale lister)	2
Total number of members:	20
Note: Due to the German occupation of Norway during World War II, no elections were held for new municipal councils until after the war ended in 1945.

=== Mayors ===
The mayor (Norwegian: ordfører) of Skjervøy Municipality is the political leader of the municipality and the chairperson of the municipal council. Here is a list of people who have held this position:

- 1838–1838: Jens Schmidt
- 1839–1840: Peder Borch Lund
- 1841–1853: Samuel Bugge Giæver
- 1854–1858: Andreas Qvale
- 1859–1860: Peder Borch Lund
- 1861–1866: Andreas Qvale
- 1867–1868: Simon Kildal Giæver
- 1869–1872: Christian Magelssen
- 1873–1874: Bendiks Bæverdahl
- 1875–1878: Christian Magelssen
- 1879–1880: Johannes Holmboe Giæver
- 1881–1892: John Hagen (V)
- 1893–1894: Ivar Lund
- 1895–1896: Peder Martin Blyth Daae
- 1897–1901: Johan Georgsen
- 1902–1913: Marcelius Hansen (V)
- 1914–1922: Thorvald Hoseth Giæver
- 1923–1925: Marcelius Hansen (V)
- 1926–1941: Rønning Østgaard (Bp)
- 1945–1945: Nils Jacobsen
- 1945–1945: Peder Rasmus Dyrkoren
- 1945–1945: Thorvald Hoseth Giæver
- 1946–1963: Lars Hallen (Ap)
- 1964–1971: John Steffensen (Ap)
- 1972–1982: Aksel Jørgensen (V)
- 1983–1995: Kurt Leif Strøm (H)
- 1995–2011: Roy Waage (KrF/K)
- 2011–2015: Torgeir Johnsen (K/Sp)
- 2015–present: Ørjan Albrigtsen (KrF)

== Geography ==
The island municipality is surrounded by the Norwegian Sea to the north, Ullsfjorden to the west, Lyngenfjorden to the southwest, Reisafjorden to the southeast, and Kvænangen fjord to the east. The municipality consists of several islands, the major one being Arnøya, with the villages of Årviksand, Akkarvik, and Arnøyhamn. Most people, however, live on the relatively small island of Skjervøya, where more than 2,316 people live in the central village of Skjervøy with its sheltered harbour. The other islands include Haukøya, Kågen, Laukøya, Vorterøya, and the northern half of Uløya. Kågen and Skjervøya are connected by the Skjervøy Bridge. Kågen is connected to the mainland by the Maursund Tunnel. The highest point in the municipality is the 1,229.58-metre (4,034.1 ft) tall mountain Store Kågtinden on the island of Kågen.

=== Climate ===
Skjervøy has continental subarctic climate. The Köppen Climate Classification subtype for this climate is "Dfc". The Norwegian Meteorological Institute has been operating a weather station in Skjervøy since 1936.

Climate data for Skjervøy, Troms
Month	Jan	Feb	Mar	Apr	May	Jun	Jul	Aug	Sep	Oct	Nov	Dec	Year
Mean daily maximum °C (°F)	−1 (30)	−1 (30)	1 (34)	4 (39)	8 (46)	12 (54)	15 (59)	14 (57)	11 (52)	6 (43)	2 (36)	0 (32)	6 (43)
Daily mean °C (°F)	−4 (25)	−4 (25)	−2 (28)	1 (34)	6 (43)	9 (48)	12 (54)	12 (54)	8 (46)	4 (39)	0 (32)	−2 (28)	3 (38)
Mean daily minimum °C (°F)	−7 (19)	−6 (21)	−4 (25)	−1 (30)	3 (37)	7 (45)	9 (48)	8 (46)	5 (41)	1 (34)	−3 (27)	−5 (23)	1 (33)
Average rainfall mm (inches)	25.7 (1.01)	25.1 (0.99)	25.7 (1.01)	30 (1.2)	42.5 (1.67)	52.8 (2.08)	61 (2.4)	56 (2.2)	63.5 (2.50)	71.2 (2.80)	42.2 (1.66)	32.6 (1.28)	528.3 (20.8)
Average snowfall mm (inches)	330 (13.0)	327 (12.9)	214 (8.4)	120 (4.7)	12 (0.5)	0 (0)	0 (0)	0 (0)	1 (0.0)	71 (2.8)	210 (8.3)	311 (12.2)	1,596 (62.8)
Average precipitation days (≥ 1 mm)	11.4	10.5	9.9	9.3	9.3	9.4	9.8	9.7	11.2	13.7	11.5	12.7	128.4
Average rainy days (≥ 1 mm)	3.1	2.8	3.8	5.9	8.9	9.4	9.8	9.7	11.1	11.1	5.6	4.2	85.4
Average snowy days (≥ 1 mm)	5.1	4.7	3.7	2	.1	0	0	0	0	1	3.1	5.1	24.8
Mean daily daylight hours	1.5	7.3	11.8	16.4	22.5	24	23.7	18	13.2	8.8	3.2	0	12.5
Source 1: WeatherSpark.com
Source 2: Weatherbase.com

== Transportation ==
The Hurtigruten (coastal cruise and cargo ship service) stops at the village of Skjervøy. There is also a scheduled express ferry operated by Boreal Transport Nord AS with intermediate stops between the village of Skjervøy and the city of Tromsø. The undersea Maursund Tunnel connects this island with the mainland to the south. There are also ferry connections between the islands of Arnøya and Laukøya offered by both Boreal Transport Nord AS and Torghatten Nord AS. Sørkjosen Airport offers flights to Tromsø and several destinations in Finnmark.

== Notable people ==
- Leonhard Seppala (1877-1967), a Norwegian-Kven dog musher who was brought up in Skjervøy
- Knut Werner Hansen (born 1951 in Skjervøy), a Norwegian politician and county mayor of Troms
- Hanne Grete Einarsen (born 1966), a Norwegian-Sami artist who was brought up in Skjervøy
- Odd-Karl Stangnes (born 1968 in Skjervøy), a football coach and former player
- Kristina Torbergsen (born 1987 in Skjervøy), a Norwegian politician

== Media gallery ==
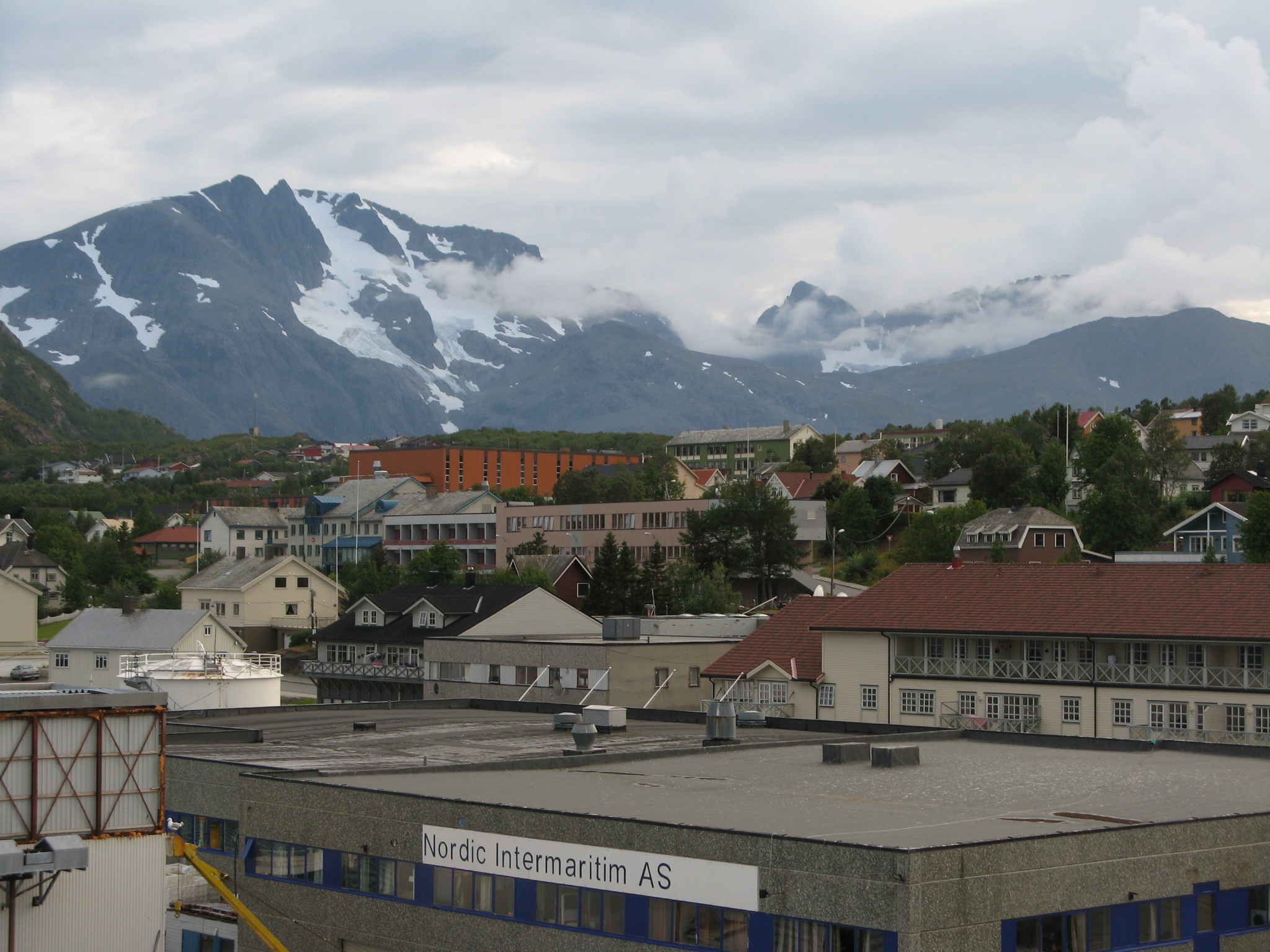
Part of Skjervøy village

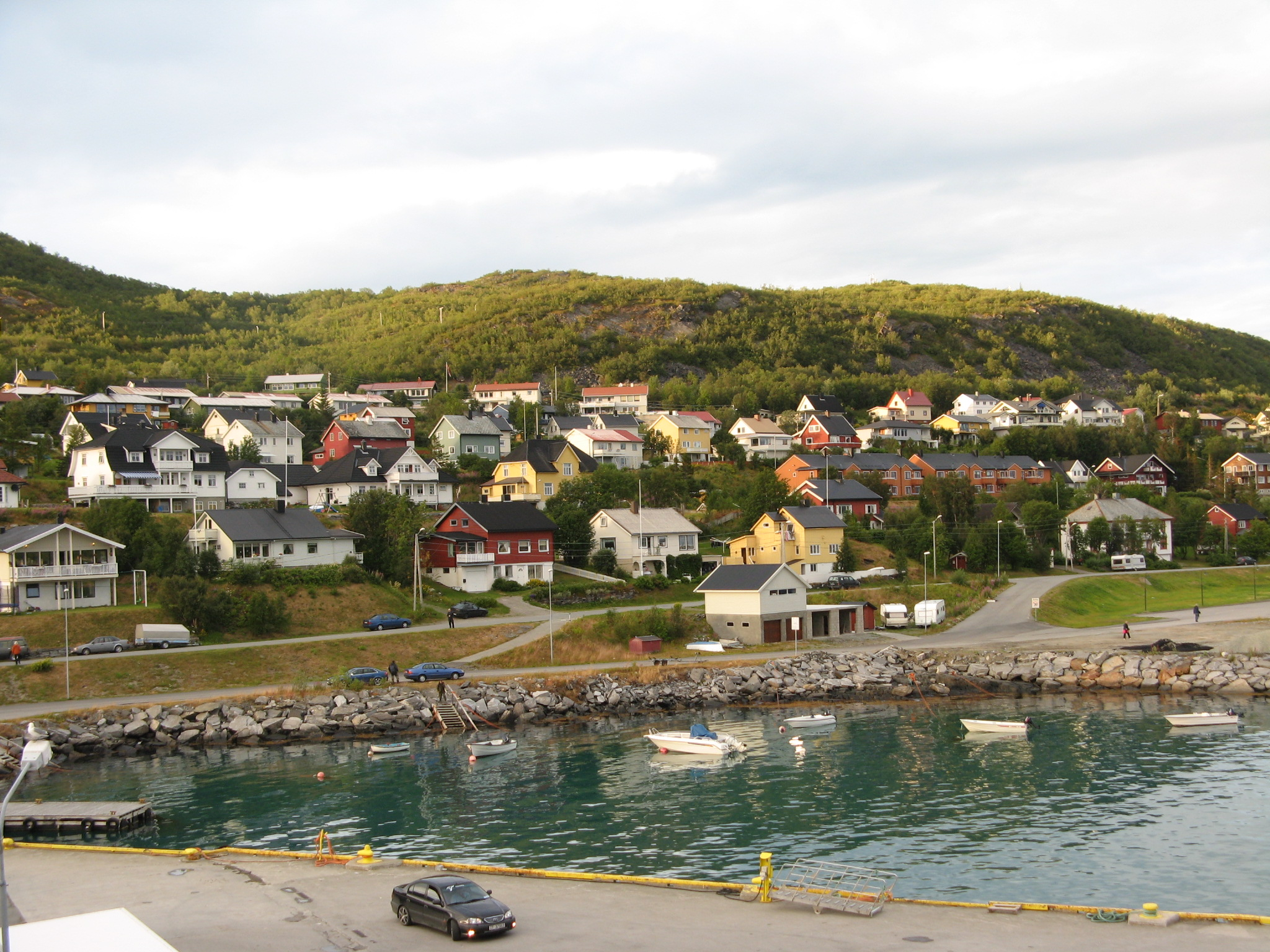
Part of Skjervøy village

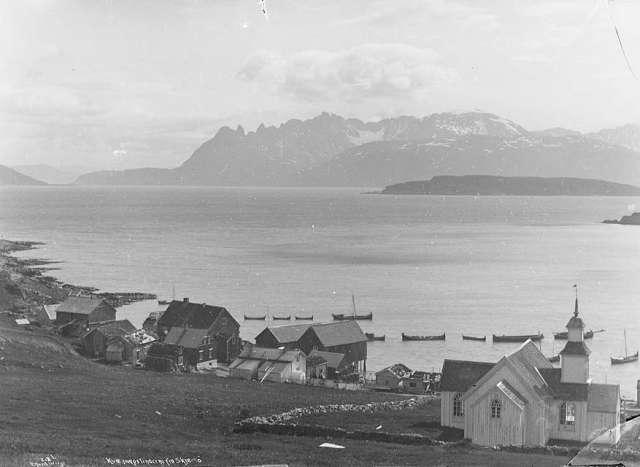
Old photo of Skjervøy Church

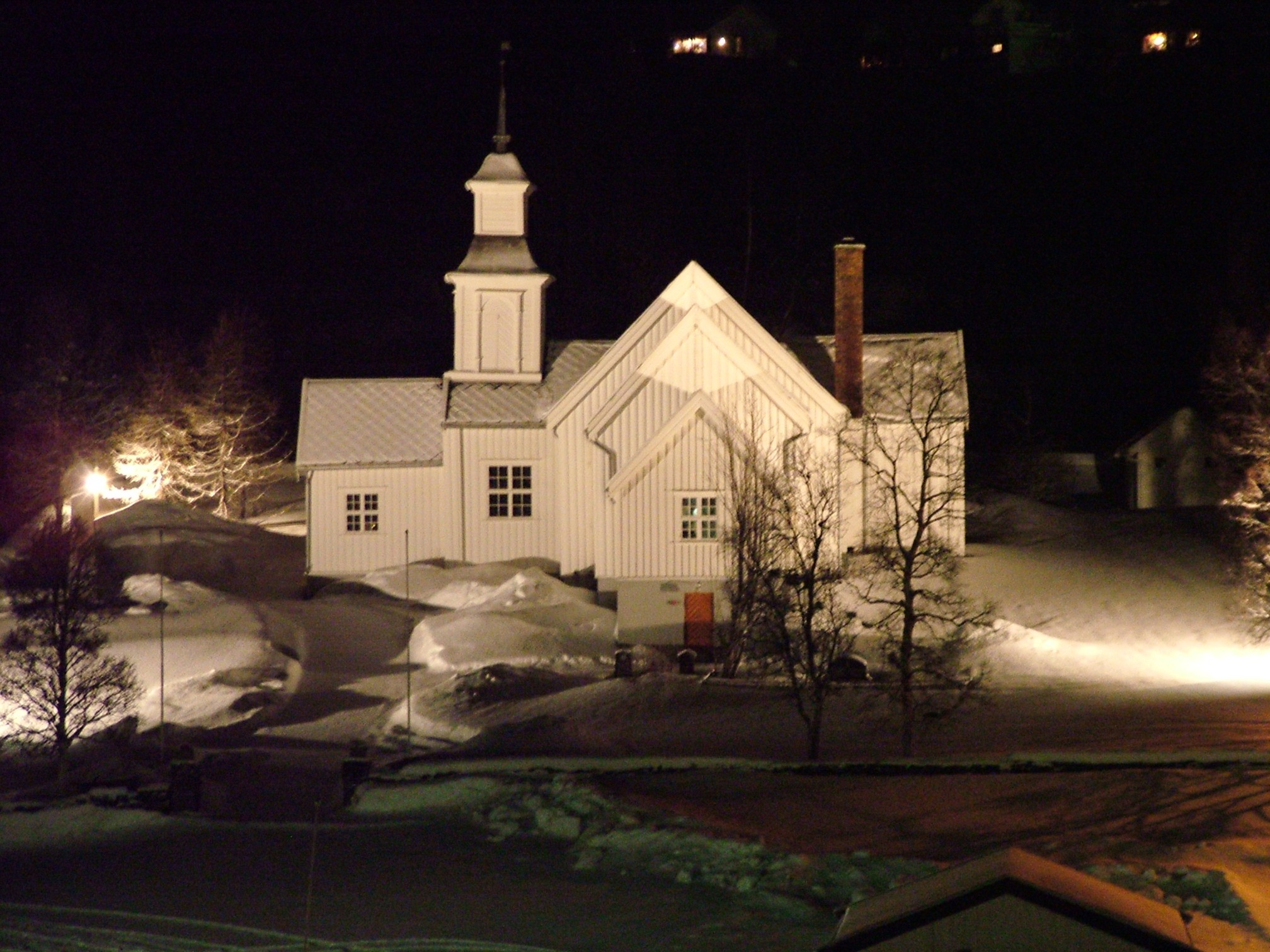
Skjervøy Church
