= Salangen =

Salangen may refer to:

== Places ==
- Salangen Municipality, a municipality in Troms county, Norway
- Salangen (fjord), a fjord in Troms county, Norway
- Salangen Church, a church in Salangen Municipality in Troms county, Norway
- Salangen Airport, Elvenes, an airport in Troms county, Norway

== Other ==
- Salangen IF, a Norwegian alliance sports club from Sjøvegan in Troms county
- MF Salangen, a 1972 ship
