= List of airports in Norway =

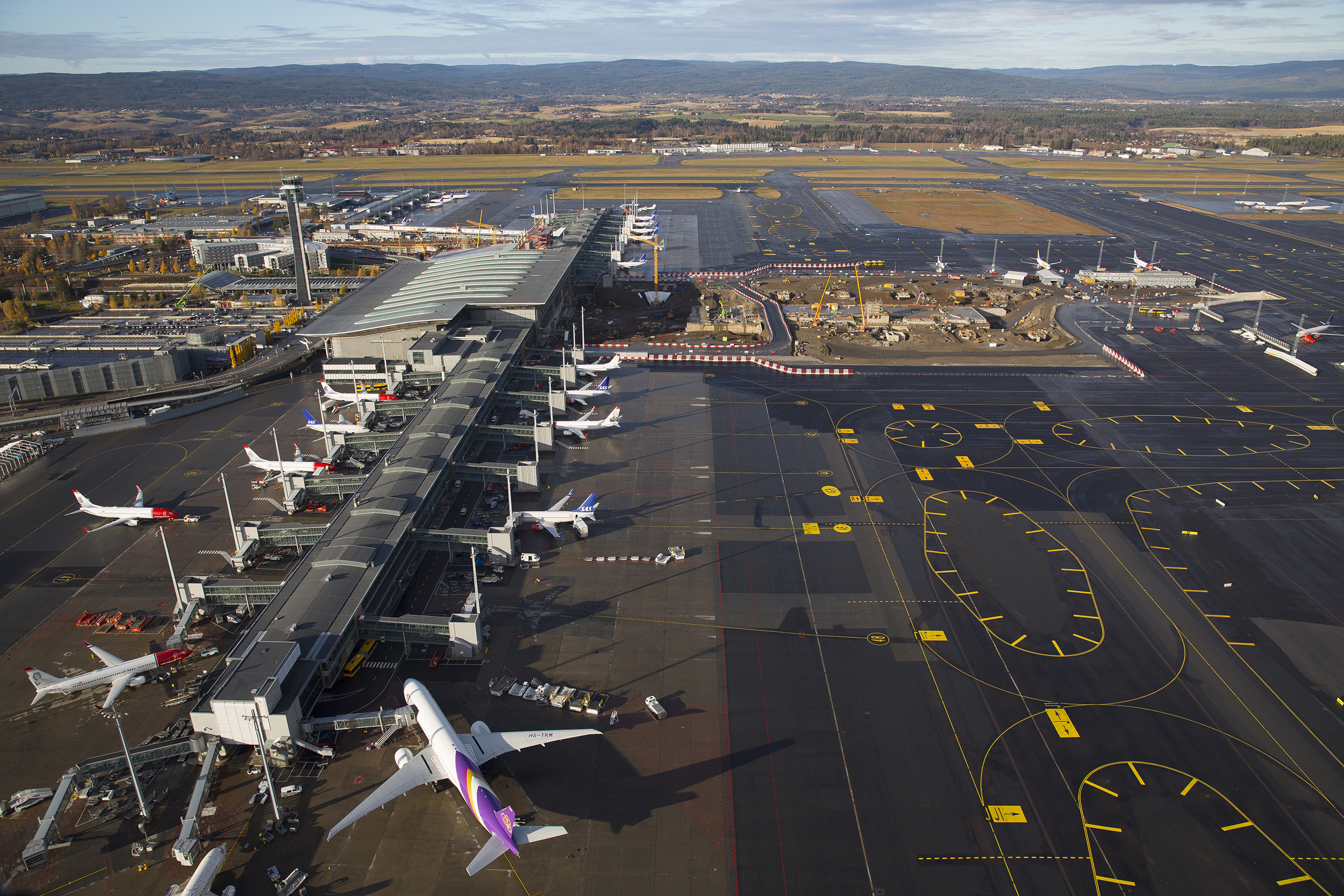
Oslo Airport, Gardermoen is the busiest airport in Norway

Norway has 98 airports which are certified or have been designated an International Civil Aviation Organization airport code (ICAO code). Forty-eight airports facilitate public flights, including one heliport, Værøy Heliport. Forty-five of these are owned by the government through its airport operator, Avinor. Scheduled airports are grouped into primary airports, which are sufficiently large to serve jetliners, and regional airports, which can only handle regional aircraft.

The airports used only for general aviation (GA) are owned by a mix of municipalities, aviation clubs and private companies. The latter include some which are controlled by the state or municipalities. Two are owned by the Norwegian Armed Forces. The Royal Norwegian Air Force has ten air stations which are co-located with primary airports ("joint" airports).

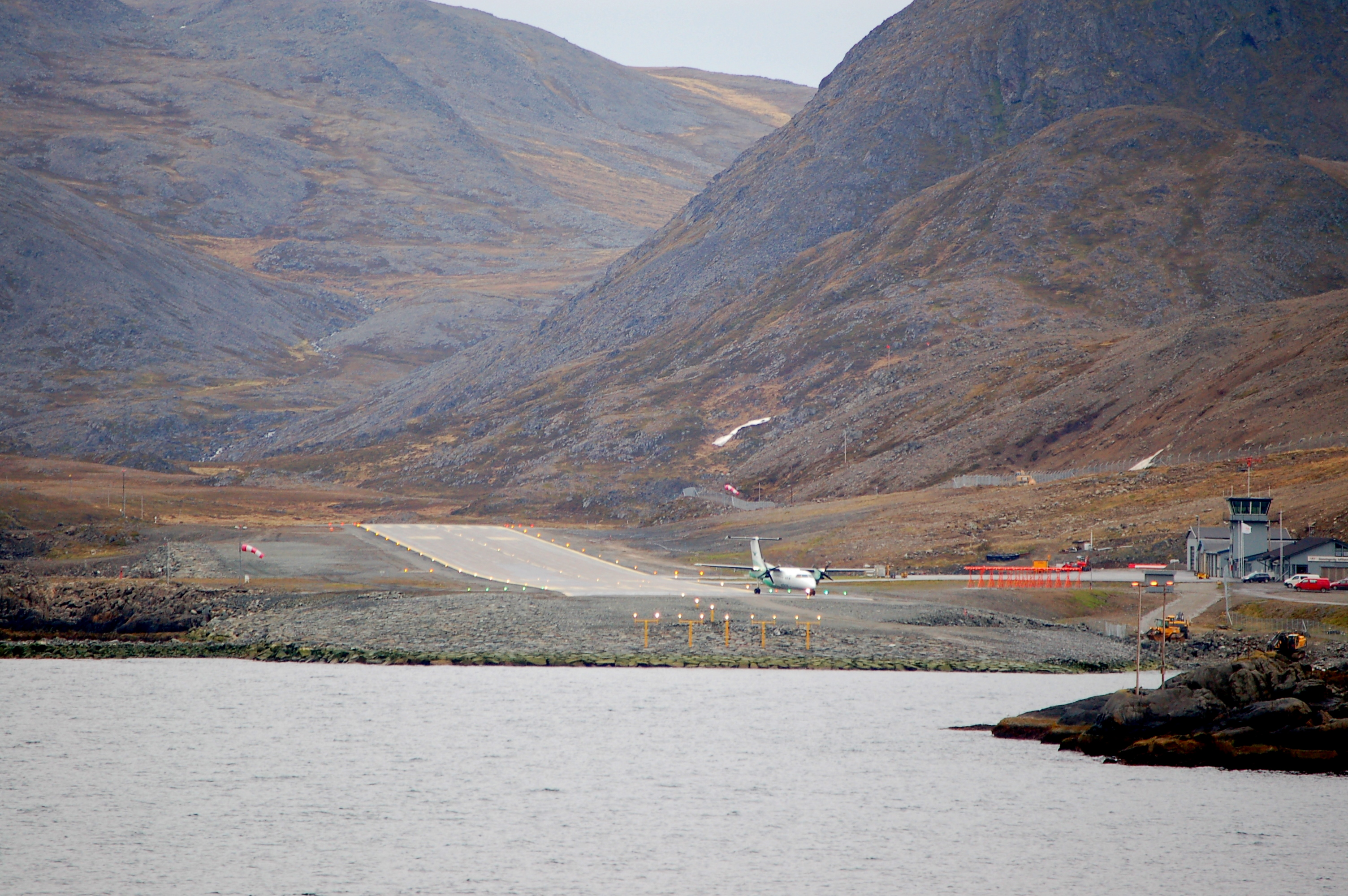
A de Havilland Canada Dash 8-100 of Widerøe at Honningsvåg Airport, Valan, one of 29 regional airports in Norway

Oslo Airport, Gardermoen is by a factor of almost four the busiest airport in the country, about half of which is international services. It opened in 1998—replacing Oslo Airport, Fornebu— and serves as a hub for Norwegian Air Shuttle and Scandinavian Airlines (SAS). It is followed by three other major airports, Bergen Airport, Flesland; Stavanger Airport; and Trondheim Airport, Værnes. These act as focus cities for said airlines. The four next airports are of almost equal size. Sandefjord Airport, Torp serves low-cost airlines in Eastern Norway and is often branded as "Oslo" by airlines such as Ryanair. Bodø Airport and Tromsø Airport act as hubs within Northern Norway, from which Widerøe flies to regional airports. Oslo, Trondheim and Bergen have a similar function in Southern Norway.

Map of current and closed scheduled airports in Norway

Norway is the country in Europe with the most airline trips per capita. The routes from Oslo to Trondheim, Bergen and Stavanger are all amongst the ten busiest in Europe. Contributing causes are a low population density, a rugged geography and limited population in the interior and the north, which combined have resulted in a poor road and rail infrastructure. Many smaller airport have short runways which permit only fairly small aircraft on short routes. Future lack of compatible aircraft has started plans to extending some, close down some (combined with road improvement) and to replace a few with new airports.

== Airports ==
The list includes fixed-wing airports approved by the CAA and those with an ICAO code. In addition, closed land airports are included if they were either issued ICAO codes or they served scheduled flights. Heliports are only included if they have scheduled flights and are part of the regional aviation system. Water aerodromes are excluded.

The list contains the airport name, the city served and the county in which the airport is located (which may differ from the county of the city served). The type of airport is subdivided into primary airports, regional airports (one marked as a heliport), military (used exclusively by the Norwegian Armed Forces), joint (airports with both a civilian airport and a military air base), GA (used exclusively for general aviation) and closed airports. The ownership consists of airports owned by Avinor, municipally owned airports, airports owned by the military, those owned by aviation clubs, and privately owned through a limited company. The list further states the ICAO code and the International Air Transport Association airport code (IATA code). The length of the longest runway (rwy) is stated. Passenger data (pax) is for 2016 and counts both boarding and disembarking passengers. Airport names shown in bold indicate airports with scheduled service on commercial airlines.

Airports in Norway
Airport	City served	County	Type	Owner	ICAO	IATA	Rwy (m)	Rwy (ft)	Pass. (2025)
**Ålesund Airport, Vigra**	Ålesund	Møre og Romsdal	Primary	Avinor	ENAL	AES	2,314	7,592	1,013,280
**Alta Airport**	Alta	Finnmark	Primary	Avinor	ENAT	ALF	2,087	6,847	382,231
**Andøya Airport**	Andenes	Nordland	Joint	Avinor	ENAN	ANX	2,468	8,097	79,193
Arendal Airport, Gullknapp	Arendal	Aust-Agder	GA	Private	ENGK	—	1,199	3,934	—
**Bardufoss Airport**	Bardufoss	Troms	Joint	Avinor	ENDU	BDU	2,443	8,015	199,535
**Båtsfjord Airport**	Båtsfjord	Finnmark	Regional	Avinor	ENBS	BJF	1,000	3,300	18,891
Båtsfjord Airport (former)	Båtsfjord	Finnmark	Closed	Municipal	ENBS	BJF	800	2,600	—
**Bergen Airport, Flesland**	Bergen	Vestland	Joint	Avinor	ENBR	BGO	2,990	9,810	6,704,306
**Berlevåg Airport**	Berlevåg	Finnmark	Regional	Avinor	ENBV	BVG	919	3,015	14,489
Bjorli Airport	Bjorli	Innlandet	GA	Private	ENLB	—	835	2,740	—
**Bodø Airport**	Bodø	Nordland	Joint	Avinor	ENBO	BOO	3,394	11,135	2,006,386
**Brønnøysund Airport**	Brønnøysund	Nordland	Regional	Avinor	ENBN	BNN	1,199	3,934	144,832
Dokka Airport, Tumlevold	Dokka	Innlandet	GA	Private	ENDO	—	740	2,430	—
Elverum Airport, Starmoen	Elverum	Innlandet	GA	Club	ENSM	—	1,000	3,300	—
Engeløy Airport, Grådussan	Engeløya	Nordland	GA	Private	ENEN	—	1,200	3,900	—
Fagernes Airport, Leirin	Fagernes	Innlandet	GA	Avinor	ENFG	VDB	2,060	6,760	—
Farsund Airport, Lista	Farsund	Vest-Agder	GA	Private	ENLI	FAN	2,990	9,810	—
**Florø Airport**	Florø	Vestland	Regional	Avinor	ENFL	FRO	1,199	3,934	131,398
**Førde Airport**	Førde	Sogn og Fjordane	Regional	Avinor	ENBL	FDE	940	3,080	82,922
Førde Airport, Øyrane	Førde	Vestland	Closed	Municipal	ENFD	FDE	800	2,600	—
Frøya Airport, Flatval	Sistranda	Trøndelag	GA	Private	ENFA	—	730	2,400	—
Geilo Airport, Dagali	Geilo	Buskerud	GA	Municipal	ENDI	DLD	1,799	5,902	—
Gol Airport, Klanten	Gol	Buskerud	GA	Club	ENKL	GLL	1,150	3,770	—
Grimsmoen Airport, Folldal	Folldal	Innlandet	GA	Club	ENGN	—	1,000	3,300	—
Hamar Airport, Stafsberg	Hamar	Innlandet	GA	Municipal	ENHA	HMR	944	3,097	—
**Hammerfest Airport**	Hammerfest	Finnmark	Regional	Avinor	ENHF	HFT	882	2,894	191,203
**Harstad/Narvik Airport**	Harstad/Narvik	Nordland	Primary	Avinor	ENEV	EVE	2,815	9,236	922,812
**Hasvik Airport**	Hasvik	Finnmark	Regional	Avinor	ENHK	HAA	970	3,180	18,555
Hattfjelldal Airport	Hattfjelldal	Nordland	GA	Club	ENHT	—	715	2,346	—
**Haugesund Airport**	Haugesund	Rogaland	Primary	Avinor	ENHD	HAU	2,120	6,960	—
Hokksund Airport	Hokksund	Buskerud	GA	Club	ENHS	—	630	2,070	—
Hønefoss Airport, Eggemoen	Hønefoss	Buskerud	GA	Club	ENEG	—	1,765	5,791	—
**Honningsvåg Airport**	Honningsvåg	Finnmark	Regional	Avinor	ENHV	HVG	800	2,600	19,613
Jan Mayensfield	Olonkinbyen	Jan Mayen	Military	Military	ENJA	—	1,500	4,900	—
Kautokeino Airport	Kautokeino	Finnmark	GA	Military	ENKA	QKX	1,200	3,900	—
**Kirkenes Airport**	Kirkenes	Finnmark	Primary	Avinor	ENKR	KKN	1,905	6,250	328,364
Kjeller Airport	Lillestrøm	Akershus	Military	Military	ENKJ	—	1,600	5,200	—
**Kristiansand Airport**	Kristiansand	Agder	Primary	Avinor	ENCN	KRS	1,990	6,530	821,289
**Kristiansund Airport, Kvernberget**	Kristiansund	Møre og Romsdal	Primary	Avinor	ENKB	KSU	2,390	7,840	366,834
**Lakselv Airport**	Lakselv	Finnmark	Joint	Avinor	ENNA	LKL	2,784	9,134	74,377
Larvik Airport, Fritzøe	Larvik	Vestfold	Closed	Club	ENFZ	—	0	0	—
**Leknes Airport**	Leknes	Nordland	Regional	Avinor	ENLK	LKN	878	2,881	164,150
Lunde Airport, Nome	Lunde	Telemark	GA	Club	ENLU	—	700	2,300	—
**Mehamn Airport**	Mehamn	Finnmark	Regional	Avinor	ENMH	MEH	880	2,890	17,372
**Mo i Rana Airport, Røssvoll**	Mo i Rana	Nordland	Regional	Avinor	ENRA	MQN	841	2,759	112,417
**Molde Airport**	Molde	Møre og Romsdal	Primary	Avinor	ENML	MOL	1,980	6,500	335,737
**Mosjøen Airport**	Mosjøen	Nordland	Regional	Avinor	ENMS	MJF	919	3,015	74,639
Moss Airport, Rygge	Moss	Østfold	Military	Military	ENRY	RYG	2,900	9,500	—
**Namsos Airport**	Namsos	Trøndelag	Regional	Avinor	ENNM	OSY	838	2,749	32,270
Narvik Airport, Framnes	Narvik	Nordland	Regional	Avinor	ENNK	NVK	909	2,982	—
Notodden Airport	Notodden	Telemark	Regional	Municipal	ENNO	NTB	1,393	4,570	—
Ny-Ålesund Airport, Hamnerabben	Ny-Ålesund	Svalbard	GA	Private	ENAS	—	800	2,600	—
Oppdal Airport, Fagerhaug	Oppdal	Trøndelag	GA	Private	ENOP	—	1,000	3,300	—
**Ørland Airport**	Brekstad	Trøndelag	Joint	Municipal	ENOL	OLA	2,714	8,904	—
**Ørsta–Volda Airport**	Ørsta/Volda	Møre og Romsdal	Regional	Avinor	ENOV	HOV	866	2,841	160,135
Os Airport, Vaksinen	Osøyro	Vestland	GA	Club	ENUL	—	600	2,000	—
Oslo Airport, Fornebu (former)	Oslo	Akershus	Closed	Avinor	ENFB	FBU	0	0	—
**Oslo Airport, Gardermoen**	Oslo	Akershus	Joint	Avinor	ENGM	OSL	3,600	11,800	27,072,860
Østre Æra Airport	Rena	Innlandet	GA	Club	ENAE	—	730	2,400	—
Rakkestad Airport, Åstorp	Rakkestad	Østfold	GA	Private	ENRK	—	860	2,820	—
Reinsvoll Airport	Reinsvoll	Innlandet	GA	Club	ENRV	—	610	2,000	—
Ringebu Airport, Frya	Ringebu	Innlandet	GA	Club	ENRI	—	800	2,600	—
Rognan Airport	Rognan	Nordland	GA	Club	ENRG	—	580	1,900	—
**Røros Airport**	Røros	Trøndelag	Regional	Avinor	ENRO	RRS	1,720	5,640	18,505
**Rørvik Airport**	Rørvik	Trøndelag	Regional	Avinor	ENRM	RVK	880	2,890	43,626
**Røst Airport**	Røst	Nordland	Regional	Avinor	ENRS	RET	880	2,890	11,441
Salangen Airport, Elvenes	Sjøvegan	Troms	GA	Private	ENLV	—	500	1,600	—
**Sandane Airport**	Sandane	Vestland	Regional	Avinor	ENSD	SDN	840	2,760	49,922
**Sandefjord Airport, Torp**	Sandefjord	Vestfold	Primary	Private	ENTO	TRF	2,950	9,680	—
**Sandnessjøen Airport**	Sandnessjøen	Nordland	Regional	Avinor	ENST	SSJ	1,086	3,563	90,814
Ski Airport	Ski	Akershus	GA	Club	ENSI	—	600	2,000	—
Skien Airport, Geiteryggen	Skien	Telemark	Regional	Municipal	ENSN	SKE	1,400	4,600	—
Snåsa Airport, Grønnøra	Snåsa	Trøndelag	GA	Private	ENGS	—	590	1,940	—
**Sogndal Airport**	Sogndalsfjøra	Vestland	Regional	Avinor	ENSG	SOG	943	3,094	88,923
**Sørkjosen Airport**	Sørkjosen	Troms	Regional	Avinor	ENSR	SOJ	919	3,015	12,620
Stavanger Airport, Forus	Stavanger	Rogaland	Closed	Private	ENFO	—	0	0	—
**Stavanger Airport**	Stavanger	Rogaland	Joint	Avinor	ENZV	SVG	2,556	8,386	3,978,666
**Stokmarknes Airport**	Stokmarknes	Nordland	Regional	Avinor	ENSK	SKN	886	2,907	126,986
**Stord Airport**	Leirvik	Vestland	Regional	Municipal	ENSO	SRP	1,460	4,790	—
Sunndalsøra Airport, Vinnu	Sunndalsøra	Møre og Romsdal	GA	Club	ENSU	—	500	1,600	—
**Svalbard Airport**	Longyearbyen	Svalbard	Primary	Avinor	ENSB	LYR	2,323	7,621	200,401
Svea Airport	Sveagruva	Svalbard	GA	Private	ENSA	—	800	2,600	—
**Svolvær Airport**	Svolvær	Nordland	Regional	Avinor	ENSH	SVJ	857	2,812	118,993
Tønsberg Airport, Jarlsberg	Tønsberg	Vestfold	GA	Private	ENJB	—	800	2,600	—
**Tromsø Airport**	Tromsø	Troms	Primary	Avinor	ENTC	TOS	2,392	7,848	2,973,266
Trondheim Airport, Lade	Trondheim	Trøndelag	Closed	Municipal	—	—	0	0	—
**Trondheim Airport**	Trondheim	Trøndelag	Joint	Avinor	ENVA	TRD	2,759	9,052	4,174,172
Trysil Airport, Sæteråsen	Trysil	Innlandet	GA	Club	ENTS	—	800	2,600	—
Tynset Airport	Tynset	Innlandet	GA	Private	ENTY	—	940	3,080	—
**Vadsø Airport**	Vadsø	Finnmark	Regional	Avinor	ENVD	VDS	877	2,877	80,540
Værøy Airport	Værøy	Nordland	Closed	Municipal	ENVR	—	800	2,600	—
**Værøy Heliport**	Værøy	Nordland	Heliport	Avinor	ENVR	VRY	—	—	9,092
**Vardø Airport**	Vardø	Finnmark	Regional	Avinor	ENSS	VAW	1,130	3,710	25,397
Vest-Telemark Airport, Fyresdal	Fyresdal	Telemark	GA	Private	ENFY	—	800	2,600	—
Voss Airport, Bømoen	Vossevangen	Vestland	GA	Private	ENBM	—	1,000	3,300	—

== See also ==
- List of the busiest airports in the Nordic countries
- List of heliports in Norway
- Scandinavian Mountains Airport (Sälen Trysil Airport)
