= Salangselva =

Salangselva (Norwegian); Salangsdalselva (Norwegian); Njuorjoeatnu (Northern Sami)
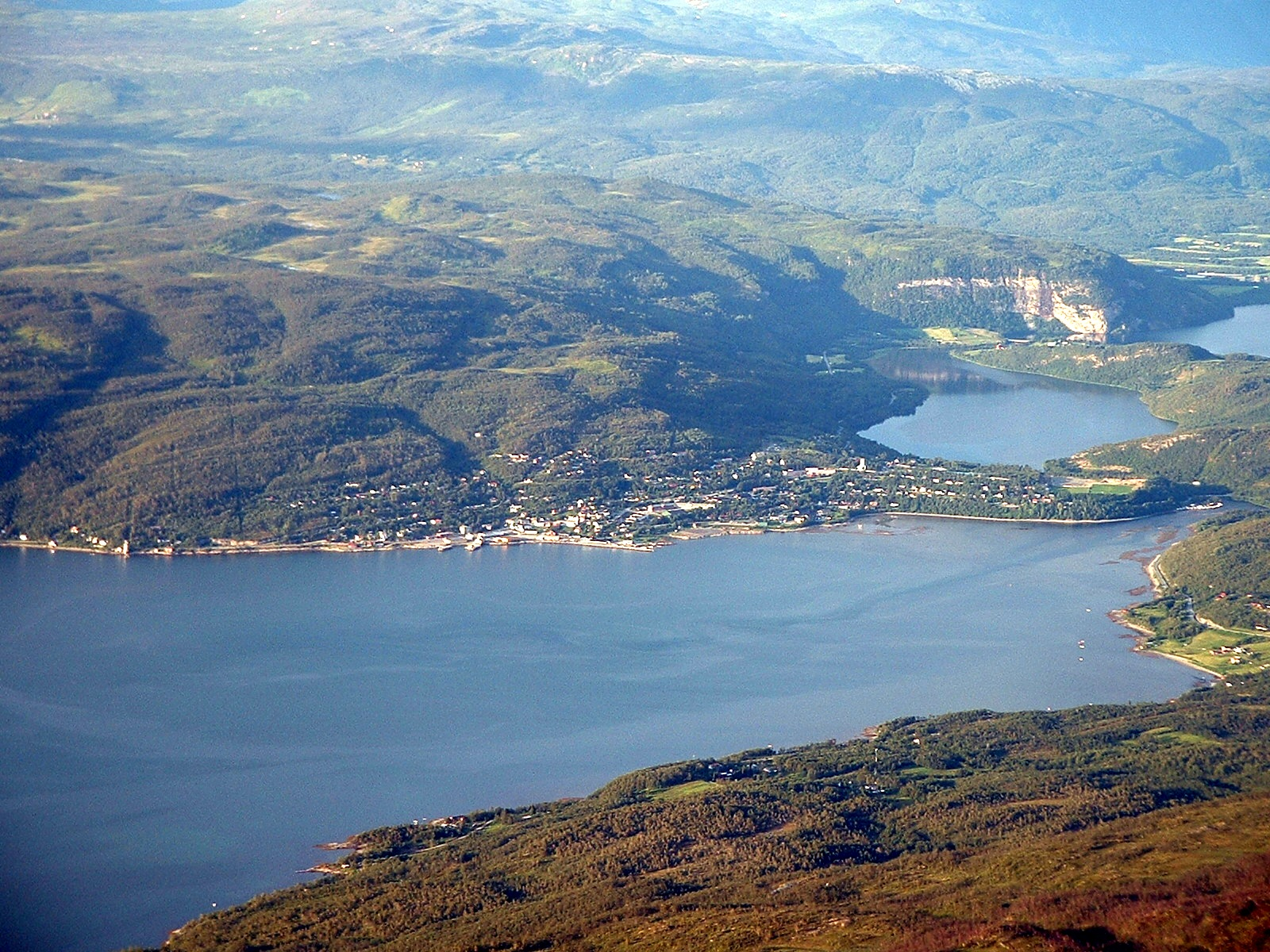
- Sjøvegan and the outlet of Salangselva into Sagfjorden
- Interactive map of the river

Location
- Country: Norway
- County: Troms
- Municipalities: Bardu Municipality; Salangen Municipality

Physical characteristics
- Source: Isvatnet
  - location: Salangsdalen, Bardu Municipality
  - coordinates: 68.5521°N 18.15688°E
  - elevation: 801 metres (2,628 ft)
- Mouth: Salangen fjord
  - location: Sjøvegan, Salangen Municipality
  - coordinates: 68.8657°N 17.8577°E
  - elevation: 0 metres (0 ft)
- Length: 53 km (33 mi)
- Basin size: 580 km^{2} (220 sq mi)

Salangselva or Salangsdalselva (Norwegian) or Njuorjoeatnu (Northern Sami) is a river in Troms county, Norway. The 53-kilometre (33 mi) long river runs through Salangen Municipality and Bardu Municipality. The river originates from the lake Isvatnet, flows through the Salangsdalen valley, the waterfall Kistefoss and the lake Øvrevatnet, and empties into the Sagfjorden at the village of Sjøvegan.
