= Naphtali (name) =

Naphtali is the sixth son of Jacob (and second son with Bilhah) in the Bible and the founder of the Israelite Tribe of Naphtali.

Naphtali, Naftali or Naftoli may also refer to:

== Given name ==
=== Naftali ===
- Naftali Bendavid, Congressional reporter for The Wall Street Journal
- Naftali Bennett (born 1972), Israeli businessman and politician
- Naftali Zvi Yehuda Berlin (1816–1893), Orthodox rabbi, dean of the Volozhin Yeshiva and author
- Naftali Bezem (1924–2018), Israeli painter, muralist and sculptor
- Naftali Blumenthal (1922–2022), Israeli politician
- Naftali Bon (1945–2018), Kenyan track and field runner
- Naftali Hertz ben Yaakov Elchanan, 17th century German rabbi, kabbalist and author
- Naftali Feder (1920–2009), Israeli politician
- Naftali Frankel, 16-year-old killed in the 2014 kidnapping and murder of Israeli teenagers
- Naftaly Frenkel (1883–1960), GULAG creator
- Naftali Halberstam (1931–2005), Grand Rebbe of Bobov
- Naftali Herstik, Hungarian-Israeli chazzan (cantor) and teacher
- Naftali Yehuda Horowitz, Bostoner Rebbe of Boston
- Naftali Herz Imber (1856–1909), Jewish poet, Zionist and writer of the lyrics of the national anthem of Israel
- Naftali Tzvi Labin of Ziditshov (c. 1916 – 2009), Zidichover Rebbe
- Naftali Asher Yeshayahu Moscowitz, Melitzer Rebbe of Ashdod, Israel
- Naftali Nilsen (1890–?), Norwegian newspaper editor and politician
- Naftali Temu (1945–2003), Kenyan long-distance runner and Olympic gold medalist
- Naftali Herz Tur-Sinai (1886–1973), Bible scholar, author and linguist instrumental in the revival of the Hebrew language as a modern, spoken language
- Naftali Zvi of Ropshitz (1760–1827), rabbi and first Ropshitzer Rebbe

=== Naphtali ===
- Naphtali Busnash (assassinated 1805), statesman and chief of the Algerian Jews
- Naphtali Cohen (1649–1718), also known as Naphtali Katz, Russo-German rabbi and kabalist
- Naphtali Daggett (1727–1780), American academic and educator, first professor of Yale University and later university president
- Herz Cerfbeer of Medelsheim (1730–1793), Yiddish birth name Naphtali Ben Dov-Beer, French Jewish philanthropist
- Naphtali Friedman (1863–1921), Jewish Lithuanian lawyer and politician in the Russian Empire and Lithuania
- Naphtali Keller (1834–1865), Austrian Jewish scholar
- Naphtali Tuli Kupferberg (1923–2010), American counterculture poet, author, cartoonist, pacifist anarchist, publisher and co-founder of the band The Fugs
- Naphtali Lewis (1911–2005), American papyrologist and Egyptologist
- Naphtali Luccock (1853–1916), American bishop of the Methodist Episcopal Church
- Naphtali Hirsch Treves, kabbalist and scholar of the 16th century
- Naphtali Hirz Wessely (1725–1805), German Jewish Hebraist, educator and advocate of reform

=== Naftoli ===
- Naftoli Carlebach (1916–2005), German-born American-Israeli Orthodox rabbi
- Naftoli Shapiro (1906–1981), Orthodox Talmudic scholar and rosh yeshiva in Glasgow, Scotland
- Naftoli Trop (1871–1928), Talmudist and rosh yeshiva in Poland

== Surname ==
- ben Naphtali (first name in dispute), a rabbi and Masorete who flourished about 890–940 C.E.
- Peretz Naftali (1888–1961), Zionist activist and Israeli politician
- Timothy Naftali, director of the Richard Nixon Presidential Library and Museum
