= Sigurd Simensen =

Norwegian newspaper editor and politician (1888–1969)

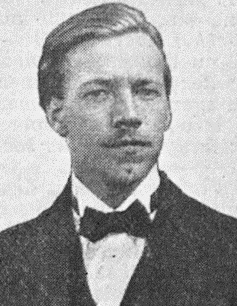
Sigurd Simensen's Portrait

Sigurd Simensen (19 February 1888 – 27 April 1969) was a Norwegian newspaper editor and politician for the Labour and Communist parties.

He was born in Vestfossen. He started his career as an iron and metalworker, working at Thunes Mekaniske Verksted. He first joined the Union of Iron and Metalworkers in 1907, and was politically organized from 1908. He became a leading member of Norges Socialdemokratiske Ungdomsforbund, and was elected to their central board in 1916. He became subeditor of their newspaper Klassekampen in 1917. In 1918 he was elected to the Labour Party central board, and was hired as travelling secretary for Northern Norway. He also chaired the national association of worker's councils which sprang up in the same year, post-Russian Revolution.

He left the Labour Party's central board in 1919. In 1920 he moved on to being subeditor in Folkeviljen. He then edited Vestfinmarkens Social-Demokrat from 1920 to 1922. In 1921 he was the leader of a seamen's and dockworkers' strike in Hammerfest, which saw intervention by the military. "Hammerfest was the only city where something resemblant to a revolutionary situation ensued", wrote historian Per Maurseth. After the strikers had been subdued, Simensen was sentenced to 120 days of prison.

Simensen was hired as editor-in-chief in Folkeviljen in 1922. While he was in prison, Naftali Nilsen was acting editor. He joined the new Communist Party in 1923, and when the Communist Party failed to gain control over the Harstad newspaper Folkeviljen, and also failed to run the Tromsø newspaper Troms Fylkes Kommunistblad, they started their own newspaper Dagens Nyheter in Harstad in 1924. Simensen became editor-in-chief. He was also a member of the city council from 1926 to 1955 (except World War II), serving as deputy mayor of Harstad from 1929 to 1930 and mayor from 1946 to 1947. He unsuccessfully stood for parliamentary election in 1927 and 1933. During the Second World War's German occupation of Norway, Simensen was engaged with forced labour. He died in 1969.
