= Seljeskogen =

Village in Salangen Municipality, Norway

Seljeskogen (Norwegian); Sálljavađđa (Northern Sami); Seljeskog (Norwegian)
- Village
- Interactive map of: Seljeskogen (Norwegian); Sálljavađđa (Northern Sami)
- Location within Troms Location within Norway
- Coordinates: 68°54′19″N 17°51′58″E
- Country: Norway
- Region: Northern Norway
- County: Troms
- District: Central Hålogaland
- Municipality: Salangen Municipality
- Elevation: 174 m (571 ft)
- Time zone: UTC+01:00 (CET)
  - Summer (DST): UTC+02:00 (CEST)
- Post Code: 9350 Sjøvegan

Seljeskogen (Norwegian) or Sálljavađđa (Northern Sami) is a village in Salangen Municipality in Troms county, Norway. It is located north of the village of Sjøvegan and northeast of the village of Skårvika. The village has a sports team, Seljeskog IL.

Canadian ski jumper Nels Nelsen was born here in 1894.
