= Salangsverket =

Village in Salangen Municipality, Norway

- Village
- Interactive map of Salangsverket
- Location within Troms Location within Norway
- Coordinates: 68.91156°N 17.72324°E
- Country: Norway
- Region: Northern Norway
- County: Troms
- District: Hålogaland
- Municipality: Salangen Municipality
- Elevation: 5 m (16 ft)
- Time zone: UTC+01:00 (CET)
  - Summer (DST): UTC+02:00 (CEST)
- Post Code: 9350 Sjøvegan

Salangsverket is a village and industrial site in Salangen Municipality in Troms county, Norway. It was founded to support mining operations in the early 1900s, and is located at the northern shore of the Salangen fjord, about 6 kilometres (3.7 mi) northwest of the village of Sjøvegan.
