= Dagens Nyheter (Norwegian newspaper) =

Norwegian newspaper

Dagens Nyheter was a Norwegian newspaper, published in Harstad in Troms county.

Dagens Nyheter was started on 20 March 1924 as the Communist Party organ in the county—Troms Fylkes Kommunistblad had capsized a month earlier. Dagens Nyheter was first published twice a week, but this was cut to once from early 1925. The newspaper went defunct after its last issue on 7 March 1931.

The first editor was Sigurd Simensen.
