= Naftali Nilsen =

Norwegian newspaper editor and politician

Naftali Nilsen (1890 – 1968) was a Norwegian newspaper editor and politician for the Labour Party.

He was born in Trondenes. He was a brother of Alfred Nilsen and an uncle of Rolf Nilssen, both politicians.

In 1910 he moved to the United States, returning to Trondenes in 1917, and becoming chairman in the local Labour Party. He was a member of Trondenes municipal council from 1920 to 1924, and was a deputy representative to the Parliament of Norway during the term 1922–1924. He was also acting editor of the newspaper Folkeviljen in 1922, while Sigurd Simensen was imprisoned for revolutionary activity. In 1923, when Simensen joined the new Communist Party, the Labour Party retained control over Folkeviljen, and Simensen was replaced by an editing committee of Naftali Nilsen, Kristian Tønder and Alfons Johansen. Johansen took over as sole editor a few weeks later.

From 1924 to 1932, Nilsen was the editor-in-chief of Fremover in Narvik. He chaired the regional party in Nordre Salten, and was a member of Narvik city council. At the 1927 national party convention he was the secretary. In 1931 he was indicted for breach of the Penal Law § 222, in that he had published the names of four strikebreakers. Defended by Theodor Broch, he was acquitted. The editorship in Fremover was resigned in April 1932, but he eventually became chief librarian in Narvik from 1935 to 1937. In 1933 he was acting editor of Folkeviljen while Alfons Johansen was a member of Parliament. He later moved to Lillestrøm where he lived the rest of his life.
