= Laberget =

Village in Salangen Municipality, Norway

Laberget: Laberget (Norwegian); Sáhka (Northern Sami); Laberg (Norwegian)
- Village
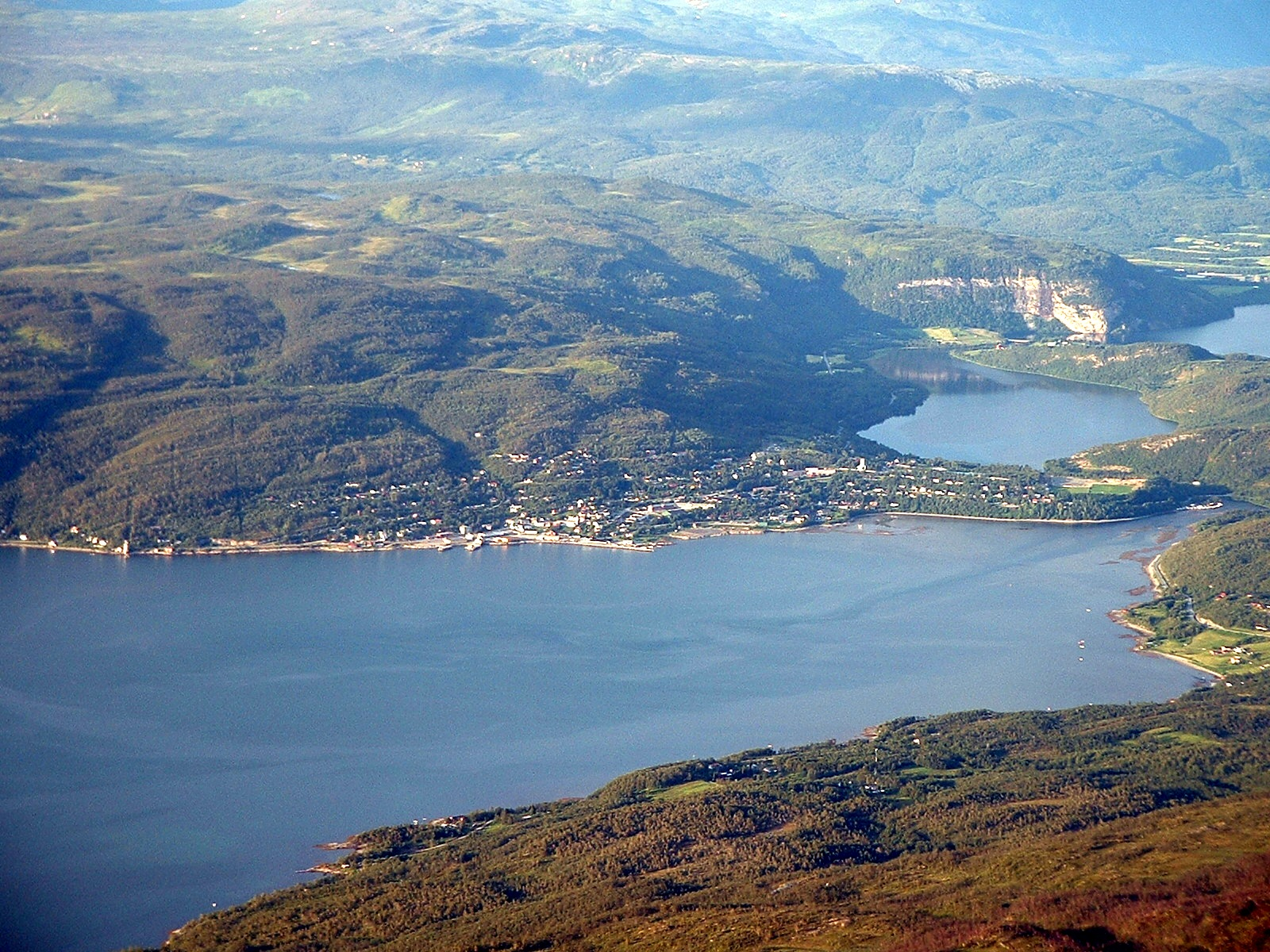
- View of the village (lower right shore)
- Interactive map of Laberget
- Location within Troms Location within Norway
- Coordinates: 68°51′41″N 17°49′11″E
- Country: Norway
- Region: Northern Norway
- County: Troms
- District: Hålogaland
- Municipality: Salangen Municipality
- Elevation: 32 m (105 ft)
- Time zone: UTC+01:00 (CET)
  - Summer (DST): UTC+02:00 (CEST)
- Post Code: 9350 Sjøvegan

Laberget (Norwegian) or Sáhka (Northern Sami) is a village in Salangen Municipality in Troms county, Norway. It is located about 3.5 kilometres (2.2 mi) southwest of the administrative centre of Sjøvegan. Laberget is located at the end of the Sagfjorden where the Sagelva river meets the fjord. The population (2001) of the village is 222.
