= Elvenes Chapel =

- Elvenes kapell
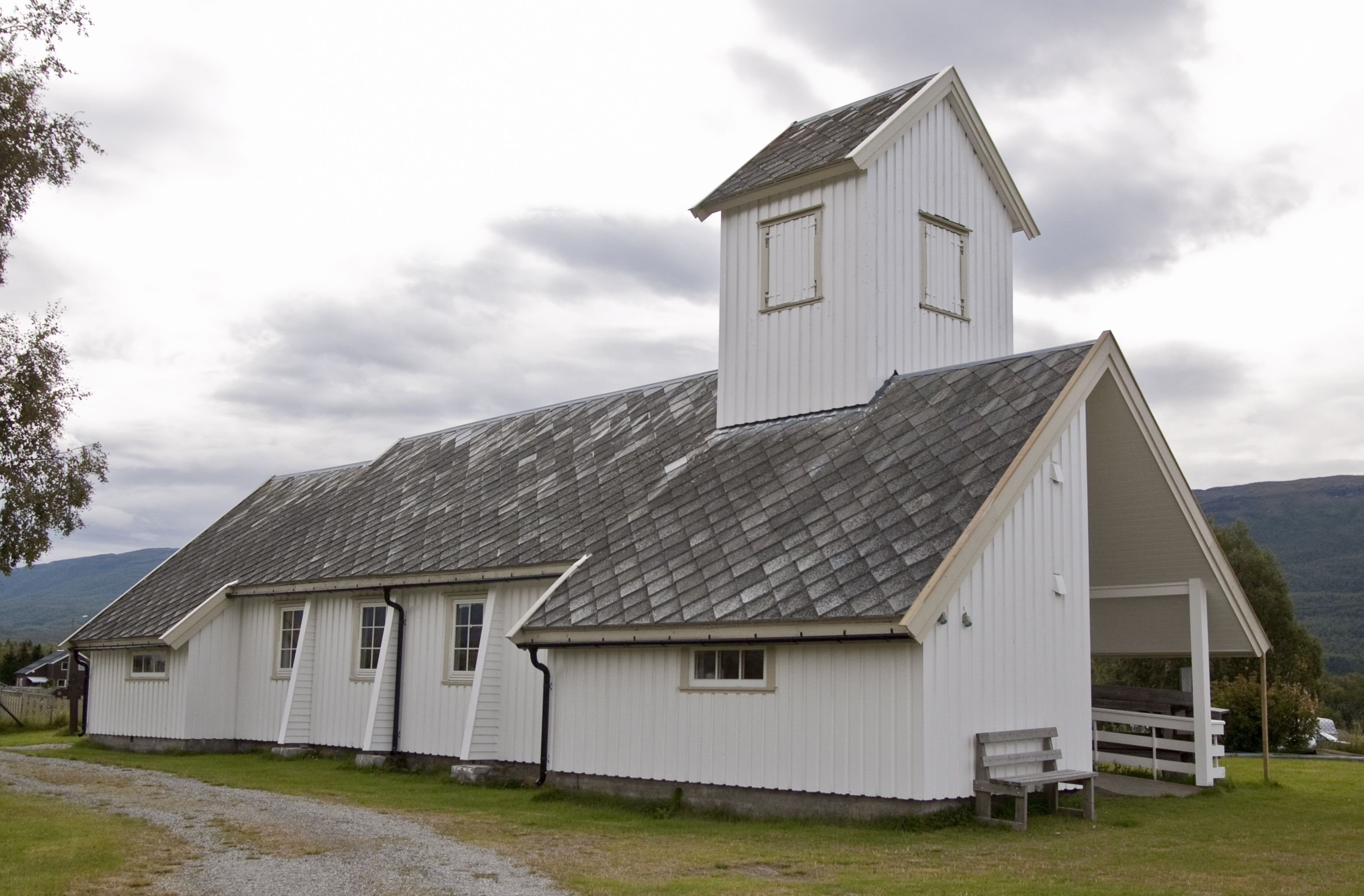
- View of the chapel
- Elvenes Chapel
- 68.869089°N 17.996454°E
- Location: Salangen Municipality, Troms
- Country: Norway
- Denomination: Church of Norway
- Churchmanship: Evangelical Lutheran

History
- Status: Chapel
- Founded: 1959
- Consecrated: 1959

Architecture
- Functional status: Active
- Architect: Svein Rydland
- Architectural type: Long church
- Completed: 1959 (67 years ago)

Specifications
- Capacity: 100
- Materials: Wood

Administration
- Diocese: Nord-Hålogaland
- Deanery: Senja prosti
- Parish: Salangen
- Norwegian Cultural Heritage Site
- Type: Church
- Status: Not protected
- ID: 84090

Elvenes Chapel (Norwegian: Elvenes kapell) is a chapel of the Church of Norway in Salangen Municipality in Troms county, Norway. It is located in the village of Elvenes, about 10 kilometres (6.2 mi) east of the village of Sjøvegan. It is an annex chapel for the Salangen parish which is part of the Senja prosti (deanery) in the Diocese of Nord-Hålogaland. The white, wooden chapel was built in a long church style in 1959 using plans drawn up by the architect Svein Rydland. The church seats about 100 people.

== See also ==
- List of churches in Nord-Hålogaland
