= Per Tønder =

Norwegian politician

Mayor of Salangen Municipality
- In office 1964 – 1984

Personal details
- Born: 6 April 1911 Sjøvegan, Norway
- Died: 18 July 2015 (aged 104) Nøtterøy, Norway
- Party: Labour Party
- Occupation: Priest, politician
- Awards: King's Medal of Merit (gold)

Per Tønder (6 April 1911 – 18 July 2015) was a Norwegian priest and politician for the Labour Party.

Tønder was born at Sjøvegan in Troms, Norway. He served as a deputy representative to the Parliament of Norway from Troms county during the terms 1954–1957, 1958–1961 and 1961–1965. He served as mayor of Salangen Municipality from 1964 to 1984. He spent most of his career there, as vicar for twenty-five years starting in 1957. Prior to the introduction of county elections in Norway, his post mayor also gave him membership in Troms county council.

He was decorated with the King's Medal of Merit in gold. In 2012 he celebrated his 101st birthday and, at the time of his death, resided in Nøtterøy Municipality.
