= Birger Vestermo =

Norwegian cross country skier

Personal information
- Born: 27 February 1930 Salangen, Norway
- Died: 5 April 2025 (aged 95) Grong, Norway

Sport
- Sport: Cross-country skiing

Birger Olaus Vestermo (27 February 1930 – 5 April 2025) was a Norwegian cross-country skier from Salangen Municipality. He competed in 50 km at the 1956 Winter Olympics in Cortina d'Ampezzo.

He was the first winner of Reistadløpet, in 1958.

== Cross-country skiing results ==
=== Olympic Games ===
Year	Age	15 km	30 km	50 km	4 × 10 km relay
1956	25	—	—	DSQ	—
