= Chief Directorate of Railroad Construction Camps =

Soviet directorate in the Gulag system

The Chief Directorate of Railroad Construction Camps (Russian: Главное управление лагерей железнодорожного строительства, ГУЛЖДС, GULZhDS) was a directorate of NKVD (later MVD) in charge of Gulag labor camps which manned railroad construction during 1940–1953. It was created on January 4, 1940, under the title Chief Directorate of Railroad Construction (GULZhD). From 1941 it become known as GULZhDS. Its main task was railroad construction, with other occasional projects, such as construction of highways in Ukraine and Volga Region, some plants, airfields, mines, and housing. Its best known project was the construction of the Baikal–Amur Mainline.

== Ditrectors ==
- January 1940: Naftali Frenkel
- April 1947: major general Ivan Petrenko
- August 1948: major general of engineering Fyodor Gvozdyovsky
- August 1951: subcolonel of engineering (later colonel of engineering) Aleksandr Smolyaninov
