= Bård Tønder =

Norwegian judge (born 1948)

Bård Tønder (born 1 May 1948) is a Norwegian judge.

He was born in Sjøvegan, and graduated as cand.jur. in 1975. He worked in the Ministry of Justice and the Police from 1976 to 1978, as an attorney in Trondenes from 1971 to 1981, in the Office of the Attorney General of Norway from 1985 and as a Supreme Court Justice from 2006 to his retirement at age 70.
