= Peder Kaasmoli =

Norwegian newspaper editor and politician

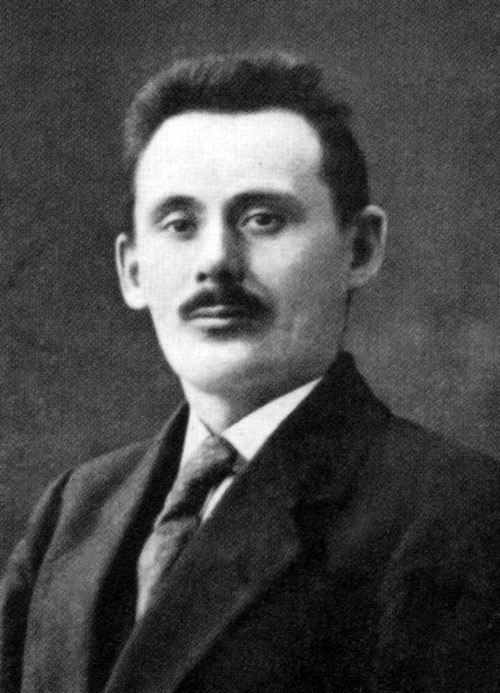
Peder Kaasmoli (1884 – 1931)

Peder Kaasmoli (1884 – 1931) was a Norwegian newspaper editor and politician for the Labour and Communist parties.

He hailed from Misvær. He started his career as a mining worker, with tenures in Sulitjelma and Kirkenes. He edited the newspapers Vest-Finnmarken Socialdemokrat from 1916 to 1917 and Nordlys from 1917. While editing Nordlys he was a member of Tromsø city council for several years.

When the Labour Party split in 1923, Kaasmoli joined the Communist Party. The newspaper situation in the city was complicated. Nordlys first followed the Communist Party, but he was fired as the newspaper came on Labour Party hands with issues on 15 and 17 November 1923. On 17 November, the Communist Party also made a one-off issue of the new newspaper Troms Fylkes Kommunistblad, before Nordlys returned to Communist Party hands from 20 November 1923 to 20 January 1924. Kaasmoli was also re-hired. Then, after Nordlys again became a Labour newspaper, Troms Fylkes Kommunistblad was restarted. Kaasmoli edited it until the newspaper's demise later in 1924. He died in 1931.
