= Folkeviljen =

Norwegian newspaper

Folkeviljen ("People's Will") is a former Norwegian newspaper, Labour Party organization and was established by parish priest and later Member of Parliament Kristian Tønder in Sjøvegan 1911, and published in Harstad from 1917. Among its later editors were Harald Langhelle, Alfred Skar, Sigurd Simensen, Alfons Johansen and Erling Hall-Hofsø. The newspaper ceased publication in 1956.
