= Erling Hall-Hofsø =

Norwegian politician and newspaper editor

Erling Hall-Hofsø (11 January 1917 – 20 May 2010) was a Norwegian newspaper editor and politician for the Labour Party.

In his young days he was a boxer for the workers' sports club Harstad AIF. He became a member of the central board of the Workers' Youth League in 1938. In 1946 he was hired as a journalist in the Labour newspaper in Harstad, Folkeviljen. He was promoted to editor-in-chief already in 1947. He remained here until 1956, when the newspaper was incorporated by Tromsø-based newspaper Nordlys.

Hall-Hofsø became famous in 1953. His newspaper printed a short piece about an attempted rape which had occurred in Harstad. The police demanded that Hall-Hofsø unveil his source for the news story, but he refused. He was sentenced to jail for maximum three months, with the option of being released if he unveiled his source. The case went all the way to the Supreme Court of Norway, who sided with the prosecutors. After seventeen days of imprisonment, Hall-Hofsø was released on 3 March 1953 because the source stood forward. A chapter in Martin Eide's book Den redigerende makt is devoted to the incident.

After Folkeviljen was amalgamated into Nordlys, he became leader of the newspaper's Harstad office. He retired in 1987. He was also involved in politics, as a member of the municipal council of Sandtorg Municipality from 1948 to 1960, the municipal council of Harstad Municipality from 1960 to 1978, and the Troms county council from 1968 to 1972. He also chaired the local school board for four years, and was an honorary member of the Labour Party. He co-founded the Festival of North Norway in 1963, and was chairman of its board for the first six years. He died in January 2010.
