= Kristian Tønder =

Norwegian politician

Kristian Pedersen Tønder (9 November 1860 – 9 March 1934) was a Norwegian priest and politician for the Labour Party.

He was born at Sørli in Nesna Municipality as a son of farmers Peder Mikal Kristoffersen (1819–1885) og Jacobine Kristine Arntsdatter (1830–1896). He graduated from Tromsø Seminary in 1883, and studied theology from 1887 until he graduated with the cand.theol. degree in 1894. At the same time, he also worked as a school teacher in Kristiania. He also taught in the municipalities of Ibestad, Dyrøy and Tranøy during his life. In 1901 he took the practical-theological seminary, and could serve as a clergyman. He was a curate at Ibestad Church from May 1902 to June 1907, and then vicar at Salangen Church from June 1907 to 1931. He chaired the school board for Salangen Municipality from 1903 to 1911, and served as mayor of Salangen Municipality from 1904 to his death in 1934.

He was elected to the Parliament of Norway in the 1915 election, representing the constituency of Trondenes. He was then elected from the constituency Senjen in 1918, and from Troms in 1921, 1924, 1927 and 1930. During the last two terms he chaired the parliamentary temperance group of the Labour Party. He also became known as the person who proposed Christopher Hornsrud as Prime Minister when the Labour Party parliamentary group voted over the question in 1928. The national board had chosen the unwilling Johan Nygaardsvold with 11 against 6 votes for Hornsrud (so the proposal did not origin with Tønder), but in the parliamentary group Hornsrud was chosen with 41 votes against 13 votes for four other candidates.

Tønder established the newspaper Folkeviljen, and was its first editor. He died in March 1934.
