= Naftaly Frenkel =

Soviet security officer (1883–1960)

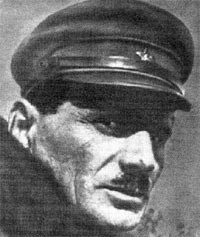
- Born: 1883; Haifa, Ottoman Empire
- Died: 1960 (aged 76–77); Moscow, Russian SFSR, Soviet Union

Naftaly Aronovich Frenkel (Russian: Нафталий Аронович Френкель; 1883–1960) was a Soviet security officer and member of the Soviet secret police. Frenkel is best known for his role in the organisation of work in the Gulag, starting from the forced labor camp of the Solovetsky Islands, which is recognised as one of the earliest sites of the Gulag.

== Origins ==
Naftaly Frenkel's origins are uncertain. The given name Naftaly is of Hebrew origin, but has been a common name amongst Russian Orthodox Christians. The patronymic Aronovich suggests the possibility of a Jewish father. Aleksandr Solzhenitsyn called him a "Turkish Jew born in Constantinople". Another described him as a "Hungarian manufacturer". Yet another claimed that Frenkel came from Odessa. Yet more said he was from Austria, or the land of Israel. His prisoner registration card states clearly that he was born in Haifa, then part of Ottoman Palestine. From Haifa he made his way (perhaps via Odessa, perhaps via Austria-Hungary) to the Soviet Union where he described himself as a 'merchant'.

Finnish communist Arvo Tuominen, who met Frenkel in 1933, claimed in his memoirs that Frenkel was related to the Frenckells, a prominent Swedish-speaking Finnish family of Germanic origins (see, for instance, Erik von Frenckell) and that he spoke Swedish.

== Arrest ==
In 1923 he was arrested for "illegally crossing borders", a label which covered smuggling or for being a merchant who was too successful for the Soviet Union to tolerate. He was sentenced to 10 years' hard labor at Solovki. The Solovetsky Islands, in the White Sea, came to be known as the "first camp of the Gulag". Together the islands were known as 'northern camps of special purpose': Severnye lagerya osobogo naznacheniya or SLON. In Russian слон slon means 'elephant'. "The name was to become a source of humour, of irony and of menace."

== From prisoner to guard ==
He rose rapidly from prisoner to staff member on the strength of his proposal to the camp administration that they link inmates' food rations to their rate of production, the proposal known as nourishment scale (шкала питания).

How exactly Frenkel transformed himself from prisoner to camp commander is also mysterious. The story goes that when he arrived at the camp he found shocking disorganisation and waste of resources (both human and material): he promptly wrote a precise description of what exactly was wrong with every one of the camp's industries (including forestry, farming and brick-making). He placed the letter in the prisoners' 'complaints box' whence it was sent, as a curiosity, to Genrikh Yagoda, the secret police bureaucrat who eventually became leader of the Cheka; it is said that Yagoda immediately demanded to meet with the letter's author. Frenkel himself claimed that he was whisked off to Moscow to discuss his ideas with Joseph Stalin and Lazar Kaganovich, one of Stalin's closest associates. Again, the truth is unclear: records show that Frenkel met Stalin in the 1930s and was protected by Stalin during the Party Great Purge years; however, no record extant has been found of any meeting in the 1920s.

What is clear is that Frenkel was promoted from prisoner to guard in a surprisingly short period, even by the chaotic standards of SLON: by November 1924, having been resident at the camp for less than a year, Frenkel's early release was requested by the SLON administration; the request was finally granted in 1927. Meanwhile, the camp administration submitted regular reports to the OGPU about Frenkel in glowing terms:

"in camp he conducted himself as such an exceptionally talented worker that he has won the confidence of the administration of SLON, and is treated with authority ... he is one of the rare, responsible workers."

== Commandant ==
Frenkel emerged as one of the most influential Solovetsky commanders. His reputation is, however, controversial: Aleksandr Solzhenitsyn claims that Frenkel personally invented the notorious you-eat-as-you-work system, also known as the nourishment scale, which destroyed weaker prisoners in weeks and would later cause uncounted casualties; on the other hand, a wide range of Russian and Western historians dismiss the many stories of Frenkel's omnipotence as legend. Journalist Anne Applebaum states,

"Even if Frenkel did not invent every aspect of the system, he did find a way to turn a prison camp into an apparently profitable economic institution, and he did so at a time, in a place, and in a manner which may well have brought that idea to the attention of Stalin."

Frenkel presided over the development of the nourishment scale, or the "you-eat-as-you-work system", from a careless arrangement by which workers were sometimes 'paid' with food into a very precise method of food distribution and prisoner organisation: he divided the SLON prisoners into (1) those deemed capable of heavy work, (2) those capable of light work and (3) invalids; each group received a different set of tasks and quotas to meet and were fed accordingly, with drastic differences between the prisoners' rations and their fate. Those deemed capable of heavy work were allotted 800 grams of bread and 80 grams of meat; invalids received half those amounts. In practice the system divided prisoners very rapidly into those who would survive and those who would perish.

Under Frenkel the nature of the work undertaken by SLON prisoners changed from such trifles as fur farming and the cultivation of exotic Arctic plants to road building and tree felling: the change in the nature of the work changed the nature of the camp and the regimes which SLON developed beyond the Solovetsky archipelago such as in the Arkhangelsk region of the Russian mainland, thousand of kilometres away from Solovetsky, to which Frenkel despatched prison labourers.

Frenkel ensured that everything that did not contribute to the camp's economic productivity was discarded: all pretence of re-education was dropped; the camp's journals and newspapers were closed; the distinction between those with criminal convictions and those convicted of counter-revolutionary crimes was dropped as both groups were set to work alongside one another simply as labourers; and the meetings of the camp's Solovetsky Society for Local Lore were stopped although, to impress visiting dignitaries, the Solovetsky museum and theatre continued to exist. At the same time random cruelty inflicted by the captors on the captives decreased: such behaviour was now considered inappropriate in an institution which valued trudosposobnost – 'the capacity to work' – above all.

Some remembered him as a dandy who had a good head for figures and, according to Maxim Gorky (who visited and approved Solovetsky Islands in June 1929) and others, a perfect memory.

Others hated and feared him: in 1927 the year of his early release, in one of the first foreign publications about the Solovetsky Islands, it was written by the French anti-communist Raymond Duguet that,

"thanks to his horribly insensitive initiatives, millions of unhappy people are overwhelmed by terrible labour, by atrocious suffering."

He was accused in 1928 by his comrades in the Solovetsky Islands Communist Party cell of organising a personal network of spies "so he knows everything about everybody earlier than everyone else."

== Kommersant ==
Before his early release was granted, Frenkel had organised and then managed the Ekonomicheskaya kommercheskaya chast, the Economic-Commercial Department of SLON, through which he tried to make the Solovetsky camps not merely self-supporting in accordance with the concentration camp decrees but profitable with the result that they began to take work away from other state undertakings: an element of competition remained in the Soviet Union in the 1920s and Frenkel took advantage of this. With Frenkel running its Economic-Commercial Department, SLON had already outbid a civilian forestry undertaking and had won the right to fell 130,000 cubic metres (4,600,000 cu ft) of wood in Karelia. SLON had also become a shareholder in the Karelian Communal Bank, and was tendering for the construction of a road from Kem to the far northern city of Ukhta.

From the outset the Karelian local authorities had been unnerved by all of this activity, not least as they had initially opposed the creation of the camp altogether. The authorities' complaints grew louder as time went by: at a meeting to discuss SLON's expansion, local authorities complained about the unfair access which SLON had to cheap labour which would put ordinary foresters out of work; at a subsequent meeting of the Karelian Council of People's Commissars (being the government of the Karelian Republic) in February 1926 SLON was attacked for overcharging for the Kem to Ukhta road with the following summing up by an indignant Comrade Yuzhnev:

"It has become clear [that] SLON is a kommersant, a merchant with large, grabbing hands, and that its basic goal is to make profits."

The authorities also complained about SLON's special links with the OGPU which allowed SLON to disregard local laws and avoid paying money into the regional budget. Within the camp itself, few doubted that Frenkel was the architect of this alleged success: he was firmly identified with the commercialisation of the camp and hated for it; at an acrimonious meeting of the Solovetsky Communist Party in 1928 – so acrimonious that part of the meeting's conclusions were deemed too secret to be kept in the archive – one camp commander Yashenko complained about the extent of the Economic-Commercial Department's influence and went on to attack Frenkel, admitting that he hated Frenkel so much that he had contemplated murdering him:

"a former prisoner who was freed after three years' work because at that time there were not enough people [guards] to work at the camp [...] when a rumour came round that he might leave, people were saying, 'We can't work without him.'"

Others asked why Frenkel received priority service and cheap prices at SLON shops (one of which had been opened in Kem) as if he were the owner; yet more queried why SLON had become so commercialised that it neglected its other tasks: all re-educational work in the camp had ceased; prisoners were being held to unfair work standards; and when prisoners mutilated themselves in protest at the work norms their cases were not investigated.

Anne Applebaum wrote:

"The argument over the profitability, efficiency and fairness of prison labour was to continue for the next quarter-century [...] in the mid 1920s the Karelian local authorities were not winning [the argument] [... and] although as late as 1929, the camp was in fact running a deficit of 1.6 million roubles – quite possibly because OGPU stole from the till – Solovetsky's supposed economic success was still trumpeted far and wide."

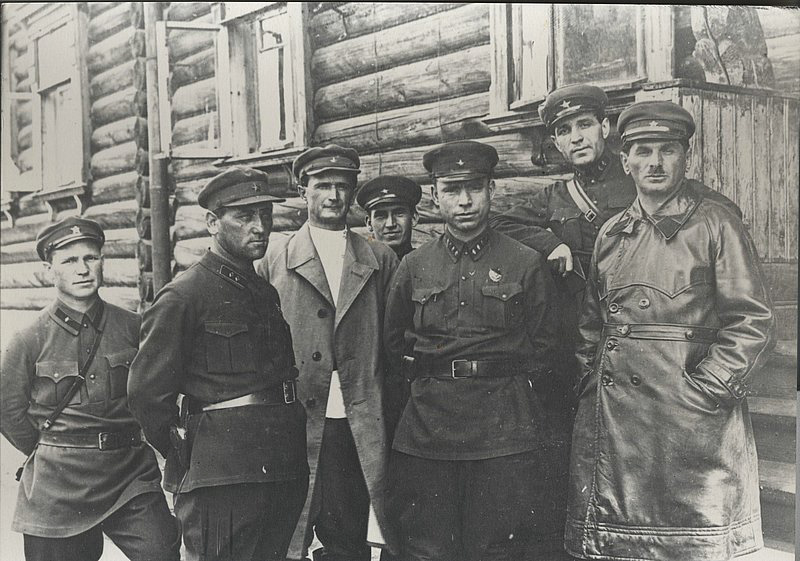
Frenkel (far right) at the White Sea–Baltic Canal works in July 1932 during the visit of Matvei Davidovich Berman (front, second from right), head of the Gulag system

The perception that the Solovetsky camps under Frenkel were profitable was shared by Stalin: Stalin's preference for prison labour over ordinary labor can be found in Stalin's continuing interest throughout his life in the intimate details of camp administration.

== White Sea–Baltic Canal ==
High-level approval of Frenkel's methods quickly led to the duplication of his system around the country and then Frenkel was named chief of construction on the White Sea–Baltic Canal, the first major project of the Stalin-era Gulag and an extremely high post for a former prisoner. Frenkel managed the daily work on the White Sea–Baltic Canal from November 1931 until its completion. He used the same methods as he had in SLON as well as many of the same prisoner-slaves who were brought to the canal works from the Solovetsky camp.

== Later career ==
In his later career, Frenkel was protected from arrest and possible execution by intervention at the very highest level. It is noteworthy that despite the deaths of nearly all of his former colleagues, Frenkel managed to remain alive. By 1937 Frenkel was head of BAMlag, the Baikal Amur Mainline railway camp, one of the most chaotic and lethal camps in the [Soviet] Far East, yet when 48 Trotskyists were arrested in BAMlag in 1938 he was not among them, although the camp newspaper openly accused him of sabotage. Frenkel's case was mysteriously delayed in Moscow, seemingly by Stalin, leading the local BAMlag prosecutor to write to Soviet chief prosecutor Andrei Vyshinsky, "I don't understand why this investigation [into Frenkel] was placed under 'special decree', or from whom this 'special decree' has come. If we don't arrest Trotskyite-diversionist-spies, then whom should we be arresting?"

During 1937–1947 Frenkel was head of the Chief Directorate of Railroad Construction (ГУЖДС) as a protégé of Lavrentiy Beria.

He was awarded the Order of Lenin three times (August 4, 1933, July 22, 1940, September 16, 1943).

On April 28, 1947, Frenkel was discharged from his duties for reasons of health, and was awarded a service pension.

== Later life ==
By the mid-1950s, Frenkel was living a reclusive life in Moscow. His stepdaughter Tamara was the fiancée of Leonid Makhnach, son of Vladimir Makhnach, the former boss of the Mosgaz Trust which controlled Moscow's gas supply, who returned to Moscow in June 1955, after 14 years in the Taishet labour camp. According to Leonid, after his return Vladimir 'was a difficult character' and there were constant arguments between the two. Frenkel took a close interest in his stepdaughter's fiancé. One night after an argument Vladimir struck Leonid on the face: Leonid left home and went to live at Frenkel's house where he remained until his marriage to Tamara in 1958. In 2004, Leonid stated that after his break with Vladimir, Frenkel became the main paternal figure in his life. Opposed to the Khrushchev regime, Frenkel remained closely connected with the MGB which helped Leonid with his movie career and commissioned the first movie he directed, a propaganda piece on Soviet secret agents during the Cold War.
