= Larvik Airport, Fritzøe =

Larvik Airport, Fritzøe Larvik flyplass, Fritzøe
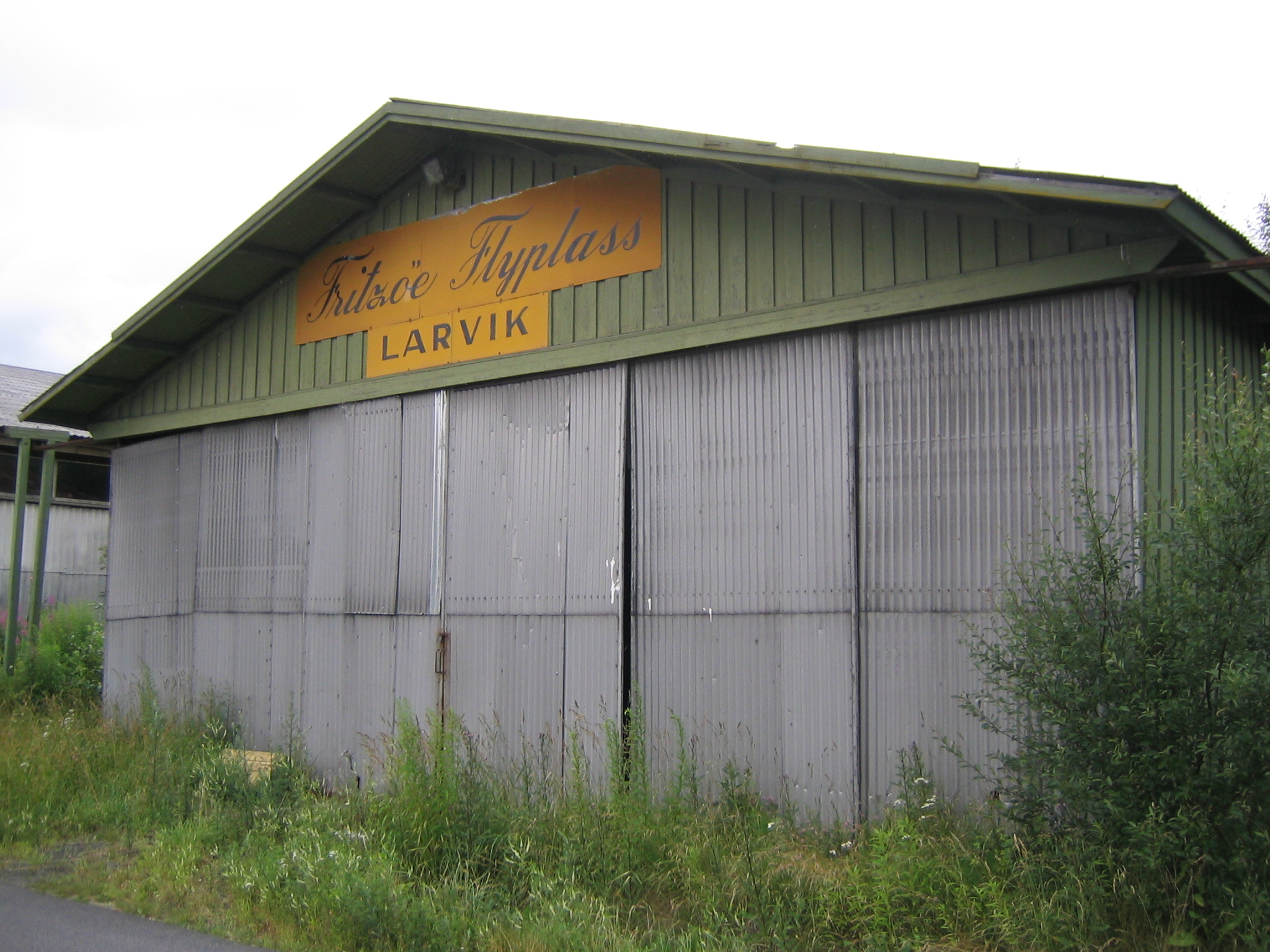
- A disused hangar
- IATA: none; ICAO: ENFZ

Summary
- Airport type: Private
- Owner/Operator: Treschow–Fritzøe
- Serves: Larvik, Norway
- Location: Yttersø, Larvik
- Elevation AMSL: 10 m (33 ft)
- Coordinates: 59°03′04″N 010°03′59″E

Map
- Location within Norway

Runways
Direction	Length		Surface
Direction	m	ft	Surface
01/19	900	2,953	Grass

Larvik Airport, Fritzøe (Norwegian: Larvik flyplass, Fritzøe, ICAO: ENFZ) was a private airport situated at Yttersø in Larvik Municipality, Norway. Straddling the shore of the river of Numedalslågen, the airport featured a 900-meter (3,000 ft) grass runway. The airport was built in 1957.

== History ==
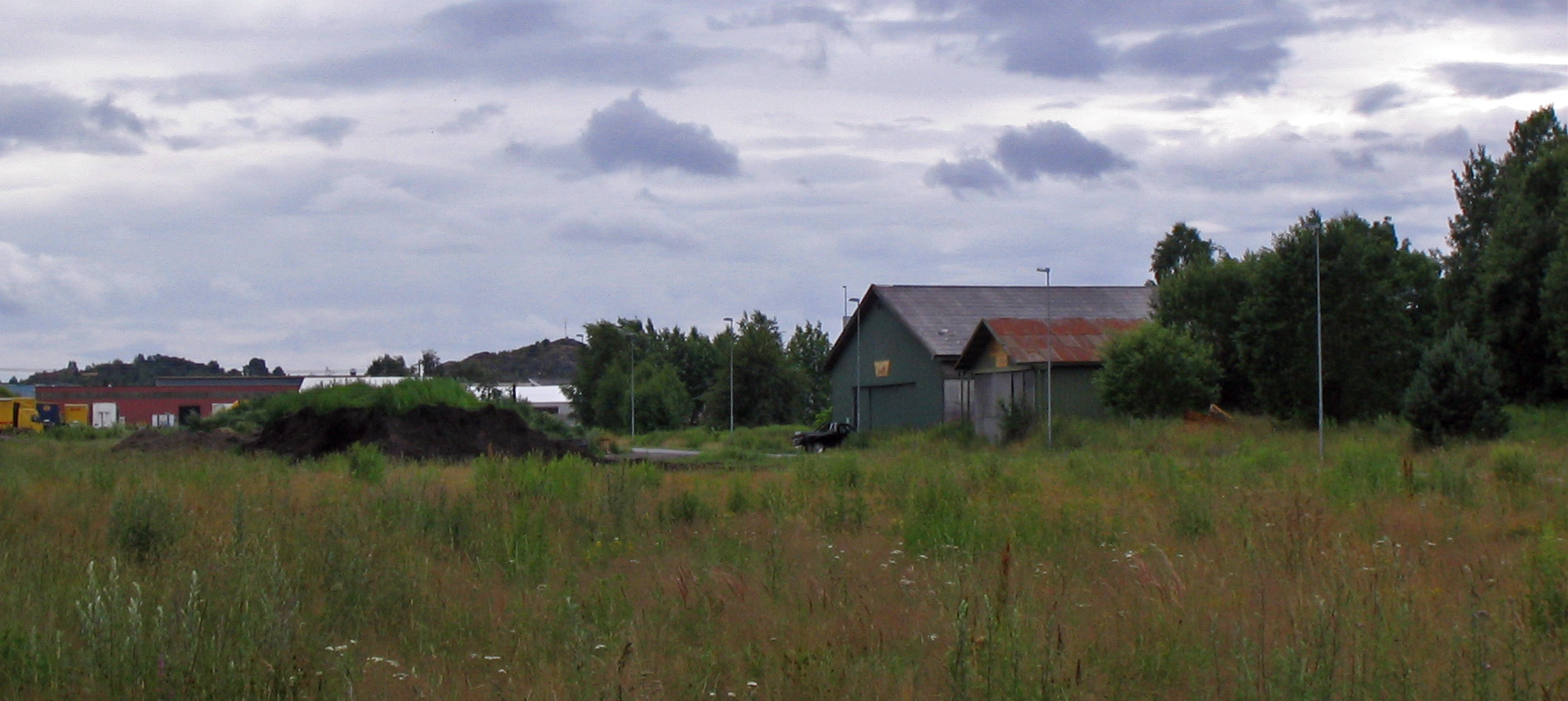
Overview of the airport

The first aviation in Larvik was an air show held at Yttersø in 1914, on the site of the later airport. The first proposal for an airport in Larvik was carried out by the Luftwaffe during the German occupation of Norway. They commenced construction of an airport at Månejordet in Hedrum Municipality in January 1945, although this was never completed.

Larvik Airport, Fritzøe was built by the conglomerate Treschow–Fritzøe under the auspice of director Gerhard Aage Treschow. The site was located close to the company's head office. The only regular commercial flights out of the airport were carried out by Fjellfly. The used it to transport the newspaper Dagbladet to Larvik. The largest aircraft they used on this route was the Scottish Aviation Twin Pioneer.

== Facilities ==
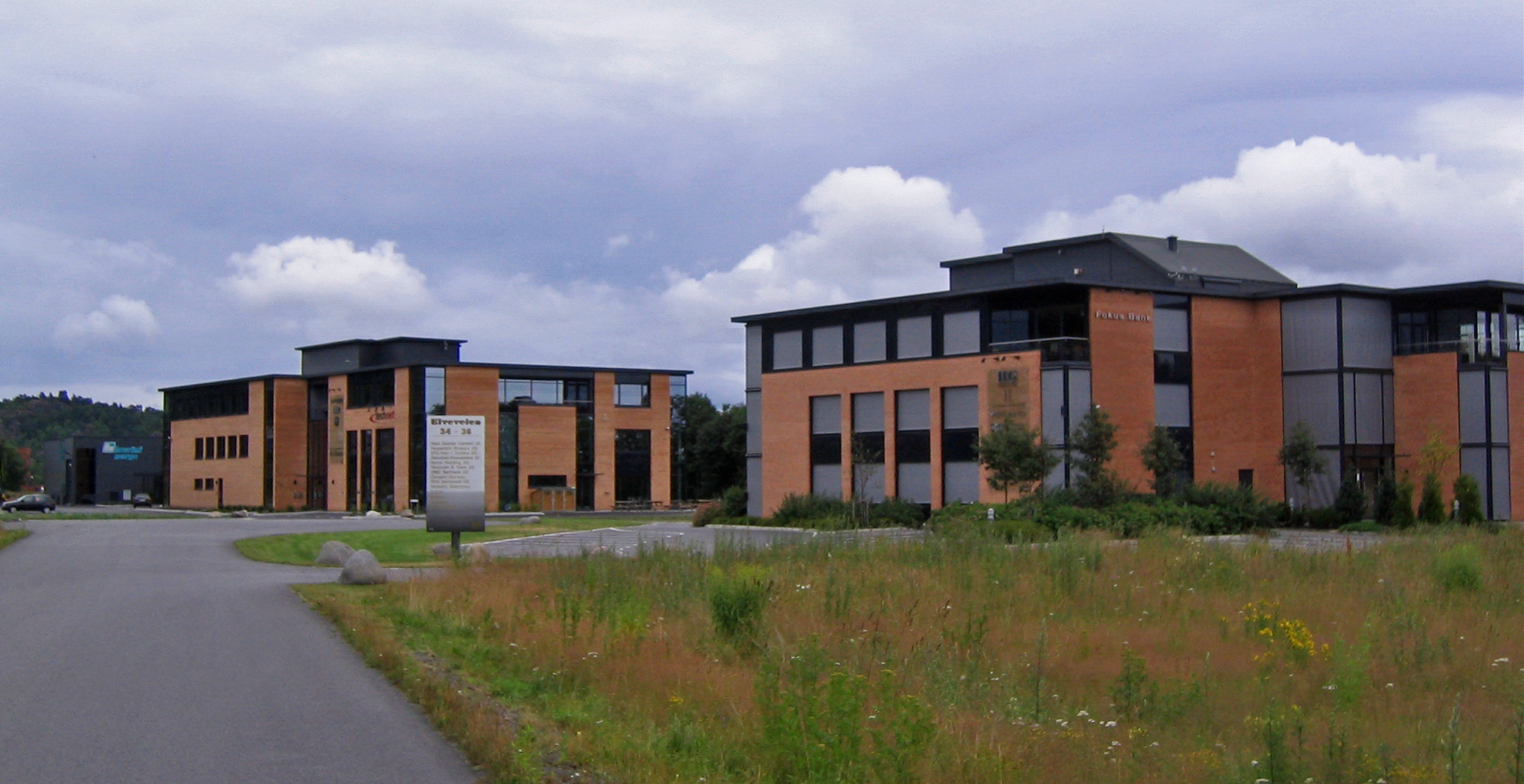
Offices located on the former site of the runway

The aerodrome was situated on the western bank of Numedalslågen on the farm of Yttersø in Larvik. The airport featured a 900-meter (3,000 ft) grass runway, aligned 01/19. The actual width of the runway varied between 20 and 37 meters (66 and 121 ft). It had a reference elevation of 3 meters (9.8 ft). It also had a landslip for seaplanes to reach a water aerodrome on the river. The airport was certified for aircraft with a maximum take-off weight of 4,000 kilograms (8,800 lb).

== Accidents and incidents ==
A Cessna Skymaster slid off the runway into the river upon take-off on 15 August 1994. Although the aircraft was written off, the pilot was not injured.
