= Salangen Airport, Elvenes =

- IATA: none; ICAO: ENLV

Summary
- Airport type: Private
- Owner: Salangen Municipality
- Operator: Salangen Municipality
- Serves: Salangen, Norway
- Location: Elvenes, Salangen
- Elevation AMSL: 8 m / 27 ft
- Coordinates: 68°52′16″N 17°59′04″E

Map
- Location in Norway Elvenes (Norway)

Runways
Direction	Length		Surface
Direction	m	ft	Surface
09/27	800	2,625	Grass

Salangen Airport, Elvenes (Norwegian: Salangen flyplass, Elvenes; ICAO: ENLV) is a general aviation airport located at Elvenes in Salangen Municipality in Troms county, Norway. It features a grass runway measuring 800 by 80 meters (2,620 by 260 ft). It also has a water airport located on Øvrevann. The municipal airport is solely used for air sports.

The first use of the area as an airstrip was by the Norwegian Army Air Service in 1915. A permanent structure was established in 1919 and remained the sole land airport of the Air Service in Northern Norway until it was supplemented by Bardufoss Air Station in 1938. Elvenes was mostly used for aerial support of Norwegian Army exercises. The airfield was upgraded in May 1940 as part of the Norwegian Campaign under the auspice of the Royal Air Force. It was surrendered to Luftwaffe, who used it sparingly as a reserve for Bardufoss. The Royal Norwegian Air Force (RNoAF) took possession in 1945 and used it mostly for Army exercise support. Since 2001 there has been regular civilian use and the municipality bought the facility in 2006.

== History ==
=== Army Air Service ===
Elvenes was first used during a 6,000-man exercise in August 1915. The newly established Army Air Service wanted to test out its Blériot XI, a task given to Tryggve Gran. His first job was to find a suitable landing field near Setermoen, the center of the exercise. This took place at Elvevold. Their task during the exercise was to fly reconnaissance, mark the enemy by dropping smoke bombs and taking aerial photography.

During the period Gran was stationed, he identified Elvenes, about 1-kilometer (0.62 mi) away from Elvevold, as a suitable site for a permanent airfield. A year later, with the increased threat of Norway being brought into the First World War, the Ministry of Defence proposed establishing an army base at Elvenes. A 133-hectare (330-acre) lot was bought for the purpose. In addition to the airfield, the base was to consist of an arsenal and a commissariat.

The Army Air Service inspected the site on 26 August 1918 and found it to be suitable for both land and sea planes. Although they did not at the time operate any seaplanes, they wanted to ensure that facilities were built in such a manner that this option would remain possible. A field was found suitable to be used for a runway and the only initial permanent structure was a hangar, measuring 20 by 14 meters (66 by 46 ft) and 4.5 metres (15 ft) tall. The structure was completed on 10 December.

Elvenes had been proposed as a site for a Northern Norwegian squadron of aircraft and was initially thought to host two flights each of five aircraft. However, the airfield would only serve as a base for one aircraft. A Royal Aircraft Factory B.E.2 was flown to Elvenes in March 1919 and remained there until 1924. It was used during army exercises at Elvenes. Work on the rest of the base continued until 1923, by which time fourteen building with a combined 2,400 square meters (26,000 sq ft) had been built.

The first use of the B.E.2 took place during an exercise from 25 March to 5 April, during which it operated with skis. The next use was during the summer and fall of 1920, when wheels were equipped. The staff consisted of two lieutenants, three sergeants and four privates. The aircraft continued to be used the following years for exercises. A Hansa-Brandenburg W.29 seaplane was used during the exercises in 1924. This used the lake of Øvrevann as a runway. This proved marginally too short and the aircraft could only operate with limited payload. The W.29 was flown back for the winter, but the following summer a new W.29 was flown to Elvenes, and it remained there for the winter. The B.E.2 was retired after the 1924 season.

From 1 January 1928 the Royal Norwegian Navy Air Service took over its army counterpart's operations in Northern Norway. Plans for a further expansion of Salangen Airport was therefore terminated and the aerodrome was mothballed. Interest resumed in the early 1930s, when Elvenes was identified as a potential site for mobilization airfield. Five Fokker C.V-Ds were flown to Elvenes on 22 March 1935. They stayed a few days before continuing northwards, and then stayed on the return flight. However, Bardufoss Air Station was chosen as the land air station for Northern Norway, with construction commencing on 8 April.

=== Second World War ===
Interest for Elvenes resumed in 1938, after the first parts of Bardufoss Air Station were completed. Elvenes was on 8 April approved as a reserve airfield, with forest clearing starting imminently. Work on the runway commenced in 1939. The runway was upgraded and expanded to measure 1,180 by 80 meters (3,870 by 260 ft). This was carried out as relief work. By the German invasion of Norway on 9 April 1940, the base remained fully operational and was fully stocked.

With the continued Norwegian Campaign and Troms remaining under Norwegian control, an air command was established at Elvenes on 19 May 1940. Work commenced immediately on upgrading the airfield. This was under the auspice of the Royal Air Force. The developed both Bardufoss and Elvenes to allow them to land Gloster Gladiators and Hawker Hurricanes. Luftwaffe aircraft attacked the airport daily with machine gun fire. By early June the airfield was in sufficient shape to be used. However, possession passed to Luftwaffe on 10 June with the Norwegian surrender.

Shortly afterwards Luftwaffe resumed the construction work. The runway was extended further, reaching a length of 1,180 meters (3,870 ft). It was also widened to 80 meters (260 ft). Unlike most Luftwaffe airport in Norway, Elvenes was given a grass surface rather than concrete. Runway lights were installed and rudimentary facilities were erected to allow Øvrevann to be used as a water airport. The German forces were, like their Allied counterparts, only interested in keeping Elvenes as a reserve for Bardufoss.

A Junkers Ju 52 seaplane landed on Øvrevann in early 1941. During December a flight of Junkers Ju 87 dive bombers stayed a few days at Elvenes. Similarly, a flight of fifteen Messerschmitt Bf 109 fighters from the 4th Staffel of Jagdgeschwader 5 trained at the airport for a few days during the summer of 1942.

There was no air defense at Elvenes until 1943. A shift in the war caused the German military to become more concerned with an Allied air attack on Troms and two anti-aircraft artilleries were installed. Work on hardened aircraft shelters were also started. At the end of the war armored troops were deployed to defend the airport from a land attack.

=== Post-war ===
Possession of the airport passed to the Royal Norwegian Air Force at the end of the war on 8 May 1945. By then the interest for developing Elvenes had dwindled. Newer aircraft would require longer runways, and there was no feasible way for Elvenes to attain such extensions. This was in contrast to Bardufoss, which was therefore selected as the primary military airport in the area. Part of the German construction had taken place on land which had not been owned by the state and without compensation, and was therefore transferred to their owners.

The RNoAF retained minimal use of the airport. The remaining part of the runway was used for reconnaissance flights in conjunction with Norwegian Army exercises, as well as for helicopters. The airfield was also used by the Home Guard for their exercises.

Civilian use started taking place in 1972, when sailplanes started using it as a landing site for flights based at Bardufoss. This activity lasted until 1974. Civilian interest resumed in 2001, when a local group started using ultralight aircraft. They renovated the runway in 2002, making it 800 by 15 meters (2,625 by 49 ft). Thus was widened to 30 meters (98 ft) the following year and 80 meters (260 ft) in 2007. The centerpiece of the activity has been an annual event hosted by Troms Air Sport District and Bardufoss Aviation Club. Salangen Municipality bought Elvenes Base and the airport from the Norwegian Defence Estates Agency in 2006. Ownership was transferred to a municipal limited company, Arena Elvenes.

== Facilities ==
Salangen Airport, Elvenes is situated at Elvenes in Salangen, Norway. The airport has a grass runway measuring 800 by 80 meters (2,620 by 260 ft) and aligned 09/27. It has a reference elevation of 8 meters (27 ft). The airport also has facilities for seaplanes to land on Øvrevann. The airport is owned by Elvenes Municipality through Arena Elvenes. The operating certificate is held by Troms Air Sport District, which also maintains the facility.

The main activity at the airport is an annual air sports event, which includes motor aircraft, ultralight aircraft, sailplanes, parachute, hanggliding and paragliding. The area has good thermals, making it a favored location for sailplane flights. Hanggliding and paragliding are based on the nearby mountain of Flåget.

During its greatest extent during the Second World War, the air base consisted of a grass runway measuring 1,080 by 80 meters (3,540 by 260 ft), stretching from Bekken to Øvrevann. The runway had landing lights. There were twenty single-aircraft hangars, of which eight were hardened aircraft shelters. There were two air defense positions, one at Elvevoll and one at Heggelund. The armored unit was located at Brattørveita, just northeast of the airport. There were trenches located around the airfield to defend against a land-based attack.

== Accidents and incidents ==
On 6 July 1942 a Bf 109 taking off had its wing impact the wing of a waiting aircraft during a scramble exercise. The aircraft had sufficient velocity to become airborne, but had insufficient maneuverability and crashed into a barn next to the airport. The pilot was severely hurt and died at the hospital the next day.

== Bibliography ==
- Bjørklund, Gunnar; Jensvold, Alvin (2010). Vinger (in Norwegian). Salangen: Arena Elvenes. ISBN 978-82-998386-0-3.
- Hjelmeland, Britt-Elise (2000). Landsverneplan for Forsvaret : verneplan for eiendommer, bygninger og anlegg : Katalog Sør- og Vestlandet, Trøndelag og Nord-Norge (in Norwegian). Oslo: Forsvarets bygningstjeneste.
- Henriksen, Vera (1994). Luftforsvarets historie – Fra opptakt til nederlag (in Norwegian). Oslo: Aschehoug. ISBN 8203220681.
