= Troms Fylkes Kommunistblad =

Norwegian newspaper

Troms Fylkes Kommunistblad was a Norwegian newspaper, published in Tromsø in Troms county.

Troms Fylkes Kommunistblad was started in a complicated situation. It belonged to the Communist Party which broke away from the Labour Party in 1923, but the Communist Party originally managed to usurp the existing Labour newspaper Nordlys. Peder Kaasmoli was the editor-in-chief. However, in mid-November 1923 Nordlys returned to Labour hands, Kaasmoli was fired and it came with two issues on 15 and 17 November. On 17 November, then, Troms Fylkes Kommunistblad came with its first issue. However, from 20 November the Communist Party had regained Nordlys, and published it until 19 January 1924. Nordlys then returned to Labour, and Troms Fylkes Kommunistblad was restarted with Kaasmoli as editor. Troms Fylkes Kommunistblad only lasted until 23 February 1924.
