= Salangen Church =

- Salangen kirke
- Salangen Church
- 68.871803°N 17.85684°E
- Location: Salangen Municipality, Troms
- Country: Norway
- Denomination: Church of Norway
- Churchmanship: Evangelical Lutheran

History
- Status: Parish church
- Founded: 1864
- Consecrated: 13 Dec 1981

Architecture
- Functional status: Active
- Architect: Harald Hille
- Architectural type: Long church
- Completed: 1981 (45 years ago)

Specifications
- Capacity: 420
- Materials: Concrete

Administration
- Diocese: Nord-Hålogaland
- Deanery: Senja prosti
- Parish: Salangen
- Norwegian Cultural Heritage Site
- Type: Church
- Status: Not protected
- ID: 85358

Salangen Church (Norwegian: Salangen kirke) is a parish church of the Church of Norway in Salangen Municipality in Troms county, Norway. It is located in the village of Sjøvegan. It is one of the churches for the Salangen parish which is part of the Senja prosti (deanery) in the Diocese of Nord-Hålogaland. The white concrete church with wood accents was built in a long church style in 1981 using plans drawn up by the architect Harald Hille. The church seats about 420 people.

== History ==
The first church built in Salangen was constructed in 1864 on the same site as the present church. The church burned down on 21 September 1978 in an apparent case of arson (since the nearby Lavangen Church caught fire on the same day). After the fire, there was some local controversy on where to build the church on the south side of the road, next to the cemetery. It was decided to rebuild it on the same site. The new church was completed in 1981 and consecrated on 13 December 1981. The new church contains the main nave, but also a parish hall, kitchen, bathrooms, offices, and other smaller meeting rooms.

== See also ==
- List of churches in Nord-Hålogaland
