= Salangen Municipality =

Municipality in Troms, Norway

Salangen Municipality Salangen kommune Siellága suohkan (Northern Sami)
- Municipality
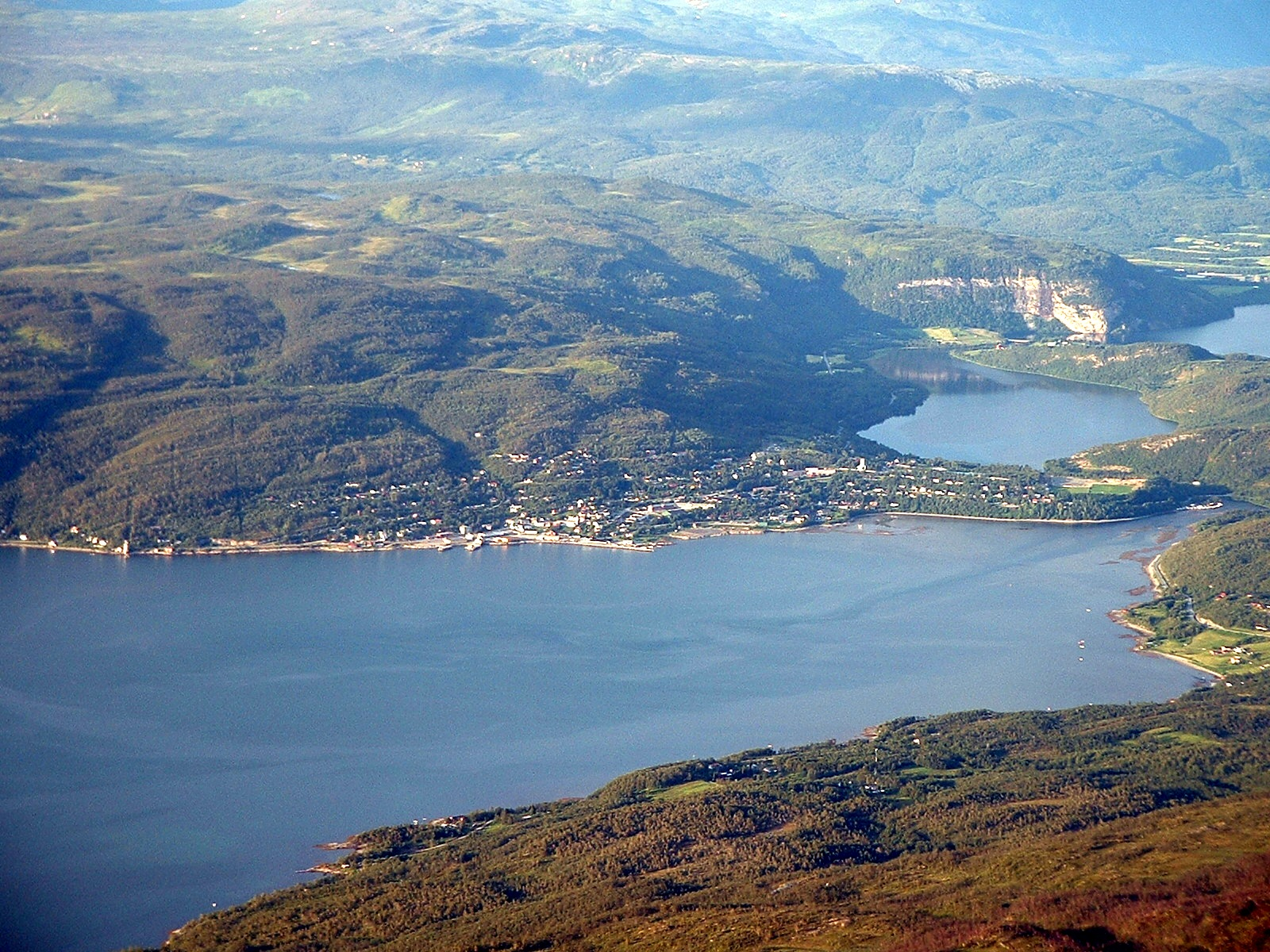
- Village of Sjøvegan

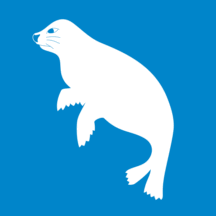
- Flag Coat of arms

- Troms within Norway

- Salangen within Troms
- Coordinates: 68°54′02″N 17°53′35″E
- Country: Norway
- County: Troms
- District: Midt-Troms
- Established: 1 Jan 1871
  - Preceded by: Ibestad Municipality
- Administrative centre: Sjøvegan

Government
  - Mayor (2023): Simon Løvhaug (Sp)

Area
  - Total: 458.07 km^{2} (176.86 sq mi)
  - Land: 438.09 km^{2} (169.15 sq mi)
  - Water: 19.98 km^{2} (7.71 sq mi) 4.4%
  - Rank: #217 in Norway
- Highest elevation: 1,378.52 m (4,522.7 ft)

Population (2024)
  - Total: 2,069
  - Rank: #278 in Norway
  - Density: 4.5/km^{2} (12/sq mi)
  - Change (10 years): ▼ −6.9%
- Demonym: Salangsværing

Official language
  - Norwegian form: Neutral
- Time zone: UTC+01:00 (CET)
  - Summer (DST): UTC+02:00 (CEST)
- ISO 3166 code: NO-5522
- Website: Official website

Salangen is a municipality in Troms county, Norway. The administrative centre of the municipality is the village of Sjøvegan, where most of the people in the municipality live. Other villages include Elvenes, Laberget, Salangsverket, and Seljeskogen.

The municipality is situated along the Sagfjorden in south central Troms county. The municipality is mostly coastal areas around the fjord as well as some inland valleys. Salangen is home to the world's northernmost bat population.

The 458-square-kilometre (177 sq mi) municipality is the 217th largest by area out of the 357 municipalities in Norway. Salangen is the 278th most populous municipality in Norway with a population of 2,069. The municipality's population density is 4.5 inhabitants per square kilometre (12/sq mi) and its population has decreased by 6.9% over the previous 10-year period.

== General information ==
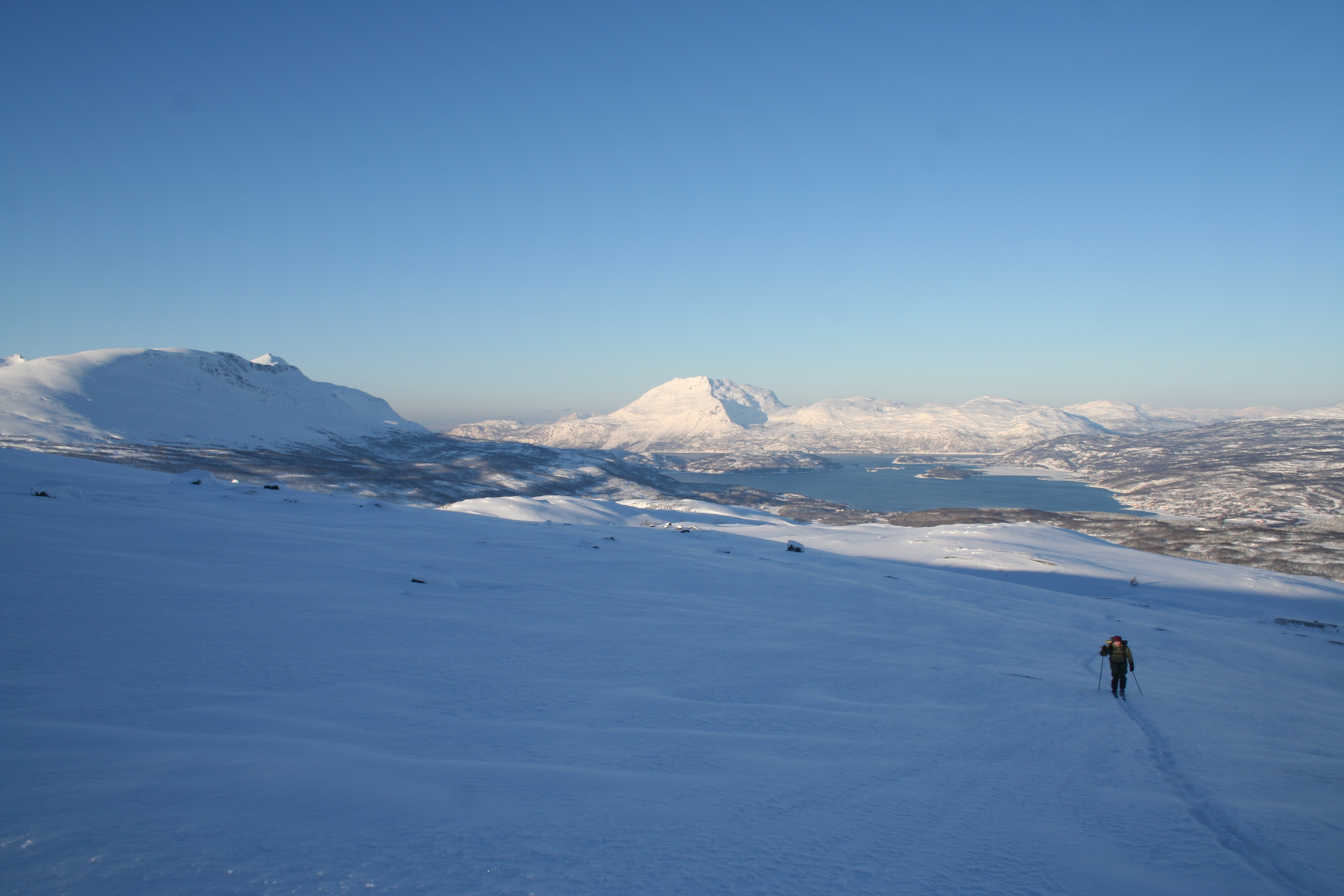
Mountains of Salangen in February

The municipality of Salangen was established on 1 January 1871 when it was separated from the large Ibestad Municipality. The initial population of Salangen Municipality was 1,384.

During the 1960s, there were many municipal mergers across Norway due to the work of the Schei Committee. On 1 January 1964, Lavangen Municipality (population: 1,677) and Salangen Municipality (population: 2,611) were merged to form a new, larger Salangen Municipality with a new population of 4,288.

This merger was not popular and on 1 January 1977, it was mostly undone. Most of the old Lavangen Municipality (except for the Lavangsnes area) was separated from Salangen Municipality to form a separate municipality once again. After the split, the new, smaller Salangen Municipality had 2,611 residents.

On 1 January 2020, the municipality became part of the newly formed Troms og Finnmark county. Previously, it had been part of the old Troms county. On 1 January 2024, the Troms og Finnmark county was divided and the municipality once again became part of Troms county.

=== Name ===
The municipality (originally the parish) is named after the local Salangen fjord (Old Norse: Selangr). The first element is selr which means "seal". The last element is angr which means "fjord".

=== Coat of arms ===
The coat of arms was granted on 2 December 1985. The official blazon is "Azure, a seal hauriant argent" (Norwegian: I blått en skråstilt sølv sel). This means the arms have a blue field (background) and the charge is a seal. The seal has a tincture of argent which means it is commonly colored white, but if it is made out of metal, then silver is used. They are canting arms since the name of the municipality is derived from the old word "Sellanger", meaning "fjord of seals". The arms were designed by Arvid Sveen.

=== Churches ===
The Church of Norway has one parish (sokn) within Salangen Municipality. It is part of the Indre Troms prosti (deanery) in the Diocese of Nord-Hålogaland.

Churches in Salangen Municipality
Parish (sokn)	Church name	Location of the church	Year built
Salangen	Salangen Church	Sjøvegan	1981
Salangen	Elvenes Chapel	Elvenes	1959

== Geography ==
The municipality is located in the southern part of Troms county, at the northeastern end of the Astafjorden. Ibestad Municipality is located west of Salangen, connected by the Mjøsund Bridge; Lavangen Municipality to the south; Bardu Municipality to the east; and Dyrøy Municipality and Sørreisa Municipality are to the north. The highest point in the municipality is the 1,378.52-metre (4,522.7 ft) tall mountain Hjerttinden.

=== Geology ===
The area itself is part of the Caledonian Orogeny formed of part of a series of Nappes that run down the coast of Norway. These nappes were metamorphosed as a result of partial subduction beneath Laurentia during the early to middle Paleozoic. On a smaller scale, the municipality is located mainly on quartzite (known as Sjøvegan quartzite locally and regionally as Bø quartzite). In the hills to the south, there is garnet-rich schist (known as Trollvannet schist).

Across the nearby lake Nervatnet and towards the village of Strokkenes, granite within marble is present (Høglund marble and Strokkenes granite). This granite is Leucratic, an indicative sign of granite intruded within an orogenic mountain building event.

=== Climate ===
Climate data for Sjøvegan
Month	Jan	Feb	Mar	Apr	May	Jun	Jul	Aug	Sep	Oct	Nov	Dec	Year
Daily mean °C (°F)	−6.1 (21.0)	−5.3 (22.5)	−2.5 (27.5)	1.4 (34.5)	6.7 (44.1)	10.7 (51.3)	12.9 (55.2)	11.8 (53.2)	7.2 (45.0)	2.6 (36.7)	−2.0 (28.4)	−4.5 (23.9)	2.7 (36.9)
Average precipitation mm (inches)	88 (3.5)	86 (3.4)	65 (2.6)	57 (2.2)	48 (1.9)	58 (2.3)	69 (2.7)	77 (3.0)	96 (3.8)	121 (4.8)	97 (3.8)	98 (3.9)	960 (37.8)
Source: Norwegian Meteorological Institute

== Government ==
Salangen Municipality is responsible for primary education (through 10th grade), outpatient health services, senior citizen services, welfare and other social services, zoning, economic development, and municipal roads and utilities. The municipality is governed by a municipal council of directly elected representatives. The mayor is indirectly elected by a vote of the municipal council. The municipality is under the jurisdiction of the Midtre Hålogaland District Court and the Hålogaland Court of Appeal.

=== Municipal council ===
The municipal council (Kommunestyre) of Salangen Municipality is made up of 19 representatives that are elected to four year terms. The tables below show the current and historical composition of the council by political party.

Salangen kommunestyre 2023–2027
Party name (in Norwegian)	Number of representatives
Labour Party (Arbeiderpartiet)	7
Conservative Party (Høyre)	4
Centre Party (Senterpartiet)	6
Socialist Left Party (Sosialistisk Venstreparti)	2
Total number of members:	19

Salangen kommunestyre 2019–2023
Party name (in Norwegian)	Number of representatives
Labour Party (Arbeiderpartiet)	5
Conservative Party (Høyre)	3
Centre Party (Senterpartiet)	9
Socialist Left Party (Sosialistisk Venstreparti)	2
Total number of members:	19

Salangen kommunestyre 2015–2019
Party name (in Norwegian)	Number of representatives
Labour Party (Arbeiderpartiet)	8
Conservative Party (Høyre)	2
Christian Democratic Party (Kristelig Folkeparti)	1
Centre Party (Senterpartiet)	7
Socialist Left Party (Sosialistisk Venstreparti)	1
Total number of members:	19

Salangen kommunestyre 2011–2015
Party name (in Norwegian)	Number of representatives
Labour Party (Arbeiderpartiet)	7
Conservative Party (Høyre)	2
Centre Party (Senterpartiet)	9
Socialist Left Party (Sosialistisk Venstreparti)	1
Total number of members:	19

Salangen kommunestyre 2007–2011
Party name (in Norwegian)	Number of representatives
Labour Party (Arbeiderpartiet)	6
Conservative Party (Høyre)	1
Centre Party (Senterpartiet)	11
Socialist Left Party (Sosialistisk Venstreparti)	1
Total number of members:	19

Salangen kommunestyre 2003–2007
Party name (in Norwegian)	Number of representatives
Labour Party (Arbeiderpartiet)	6
Conservative Party (Høyre)	1
Centre Party (Senterpartiet)	7
Socialist Left Party (Sosialistisk Venstreparti)	1
Total number of members:	15

Salangen kommunestyre 1999–2003
Party name (in Norwegian)	Number of representatives
Labour Party (Arbeiderpartiet)	9
Conservative Party (Høyre)	5
Centre Party (Senterpartiet)	6
Socialist Left Party (Sosialistisk Venstreparti)	1
Total number of members:	21

Salangen kommunestyre 1995–1999
Party name (in Norwegian)	Number of representatives
Labour Party (Arbeiderpartiet)	9
Conservative Party (Høyre)	2
Christian Democratic Party (Kristelig Folkeparti)	1
Centre Party (Senterpartiet)	7
Socialist Left Party (Sosialistisk Venstreparti)	2
Total number of members:	21

Salangen kommunestyre 1991–1995
Party name (in Norwegian)	Number of representatives
Labour Party (Arbeiderpartiet)	9
Conservative Party (Høyre)	3
Christian Democratic Party (Kristelig Folkeparti)	1
Centre Party (Senterpartiet)	4
Socialist Left Party (Sosialistisk Venstreparti)	4
Total number of members:	21

Salangen kommunestyre 1987–1991
Party name (in Norwegian)	Number of representatives
Labour Party (Arbeiderpartiet)	12
Conservative Party (Høyre)	4
Christian Democratic Party (Kristelig Folkeparti)	1
Centre Party (Senterpartiet)	2
Socialist Left Party (Sosialistisk Venstreparti)	2
Total number of members:	21

Salangen kommunestyre 1983–1987
Party name (in Norwegian)	Number of representatives
Labour Party (Arbeiderpartiet)	13
Conservative Party (Høyre)	4
Christian Democratic Party (Kristelig Folkeparti)	1
Centre Party (Senterpartiet)	2
Socialist Left Party (Sosialistisk Venstreparti)	1
Total number of members:	21

Salangen kommunestyre 1979–1983
Party name (in Norwegian)	Number of representatives
Labour Party (Arbeiderpartiet)	11
Conservative Party (Høyre)	4
Christian Democratic Party (Kristelig Folkeparti)	2
Centre Party (Senterpartiet)	3
Socialist Left Party (Sosialistisk Venstreparti)	1
Total number of members:	21

Salangen kommunestyre 1975–1979
Party name (in Norwegian)	Number of representatives
Labour Party (Arbeiderpartiet)	17
Christian Democratic Party (Kristelig Folkeparti)	2
Socialist Left Party (Sosialistisk Venstreparti)	1
Joint list of the Conservative Party (Høyre) and the Centre Party (Senterpartiet)	7
Political independents list for Lavangen (Politisk Uavhengig Liste for Lavangen)	1
Total number of members:	29
Note: From 1964 until 1977, Lavangen Municipality was part of Salangen Municipality.

Salangen kommunestyre 1971–1975
Party name (in Norwegian)	Number of representatives
Labour Party (Arbeiderpartiet)	17
Christian Democratic Party (Kristelig Folkeparti)	2
Centre Party (Senterpartiet)	3
Joint List(s) of Non-Socialist Parties (Borgerlige Felleslister)	2
Local List(s) (Lokale lister)	5
Total number of members:	29
Note: From 1964 until 1977, Lavangen Municipality was part of Salangen Municipality.

Salangen kommunestyre 1967–1971
Party name (in Norwegian)	Number of representatives
Labour Party (Arbeiderpartiet)	11
Centre Party (Senterpartiet)	3
Socialist People's Party (Sosialistisk Folkeparti)	2
Joint List(s) of Non-Socialist Parties (Borgerlige Felleslister)	3
Local List(s) (Lokale lister)	10
Total number of members:	29
Note: From 1964 until 1977, Lavangen Municipality was part of Salangen Municipality.

Salangen kommunestyre 1963–1967
Party name (in Norwegian)	Number of representatives
Labour Party (Arbeiderpartiet)	14
Christian Democratic Party (Kristelig Folkeparti)	2
Socialist People's Party (Sosialistisk Folkeparti)	1
Joint List(s) of Non-Socialist Parties (Borgerlige Felleslister)	4
Local List(s) (Lokale lister)	8
Total number of members:	29
Note: From 1964 until 1977, Lavangen Municipality was part of Salangen Municipality.

Salangen herredsstyre 1959–1963
Party name (in Norwegian)	Number of representatives
Labour Party (Arbeiderpartiet)	13
Conservative Party (Høyre)	2
Christian Democratic Party (Kristelig Folkeparti)	2
Centre Party (Senterpartiet)	3
Liberal Party (Venstre)	1
Total number of members:	21

Salangen herredsstyre 1955–1959
Party name (in Norwegian)	Number of representatives
Labour Party (Arbeiderpartiet)	13
Conservative Party (Høyre)	2
Communist Party (Kommunistiske Parti)	1
Christian Democratic Party (Kristelig Folkeparti)	1
Farmers' Party (Bondepartiet)	2
Liberal Party (Venstre)	2
Total number of members:	21

Salangen herredsstyre 1951–1955
Party name (in Norwegian)	Number of representatives
Labour Party (Arbeiderpartiet)	12
Conservative Party (Høyre)	2
Farmers' Party (Bondepartiet)	3
Liberal Party (Venstre)	2
Local List(s) (Lokale lister)	1
Total number of members:	20

Salangen herredsstyre 1947–1951
Party name (in Norwegian)	Number of representatives
Labour Party (Arbeiderpartiet)	11
Conservative Party (Høyre)	2
Joint List(s) of Non-Socialist Parties (Borgerlige Felleslister)	6
Local List(s) (Lokale lister)	1
Total number of members:	20

Salangen herredsstyre 1945–1947
Party name (in Norwegian)	Number of representatives
Labour Party (Arbeiderpartiet)	13
Joint List(s) of Non-Socialist Parties (Borgerlige Felleslister)	5
Local List(s) (Lokale lister)	2
Total number of members:	20

Salangen herredsstyre 1937–1941*
Party name (in Norwegian)	Number of representatives
Labour Party (Arbeiderpartiet)	11
Local List(s) (Lokale lister)	9
Total number of members:	20
Note: Due to the German occupation of Norway during World War II, no elections were held for new municipal councils until after the war ended in 1945.

=== Mayors ===
The mayor (Norwegian: ordfører) of Salangen Municipality is the political leader of the municipality and the chairperson of the municipal council. Here is a list of people who have held this position:

- 1871–1872: Johan Enoksen
- 1873–1876: Christian Strøm
- 1877–1880: Samuel Tollefsen
- 1881–1889: J. B. Markussen
- 1899–1906: Hans Lund
- 1907–1934: Kristian Pedersen Tønder (Ap)
- 1934–1940: Magnus Elvevoll (Ap)
- 1940–1941: Per Olai Prestbakmo (V)
- 1946–1963: Johan A Johansen (Ap)
- 1964–1984: Per Tønder (Ap)
- 1984–1994: Håkon Bendiktsen (Ap)
- 1994–1999: Astrid Tunheim (Ap)
- 1999–2014: Ivar B. Prestbakmo (Sp)
- 2014–2023: Sigrun W. Prestbakmo (Sp)
- 2023–present: Simon Løvhaug (Sp)

== Notable people ==
- Nels Nelsen (1894 in Salangen – 1943), a Canadian ski jumper active from 1916 to 1932
- Dag Tønder (1907 in Salangen – 1989), an editor, lawyer, judge, and acting county governor
- Birger Vestermo (1930 in Salangen – 2025), a cross-country skier who competed at the 1956 Winter Olympics
- Bård Tønder (born 1948 in Salangen), a Norwegian judge and Supreme Court Justice from 2006 to 2018
