= Salangen (fjord) =

Fjord in Salangen Municipality in Troms county, Norway

Salangen (Norwegian) Siellakvuotna (Northern Sami)
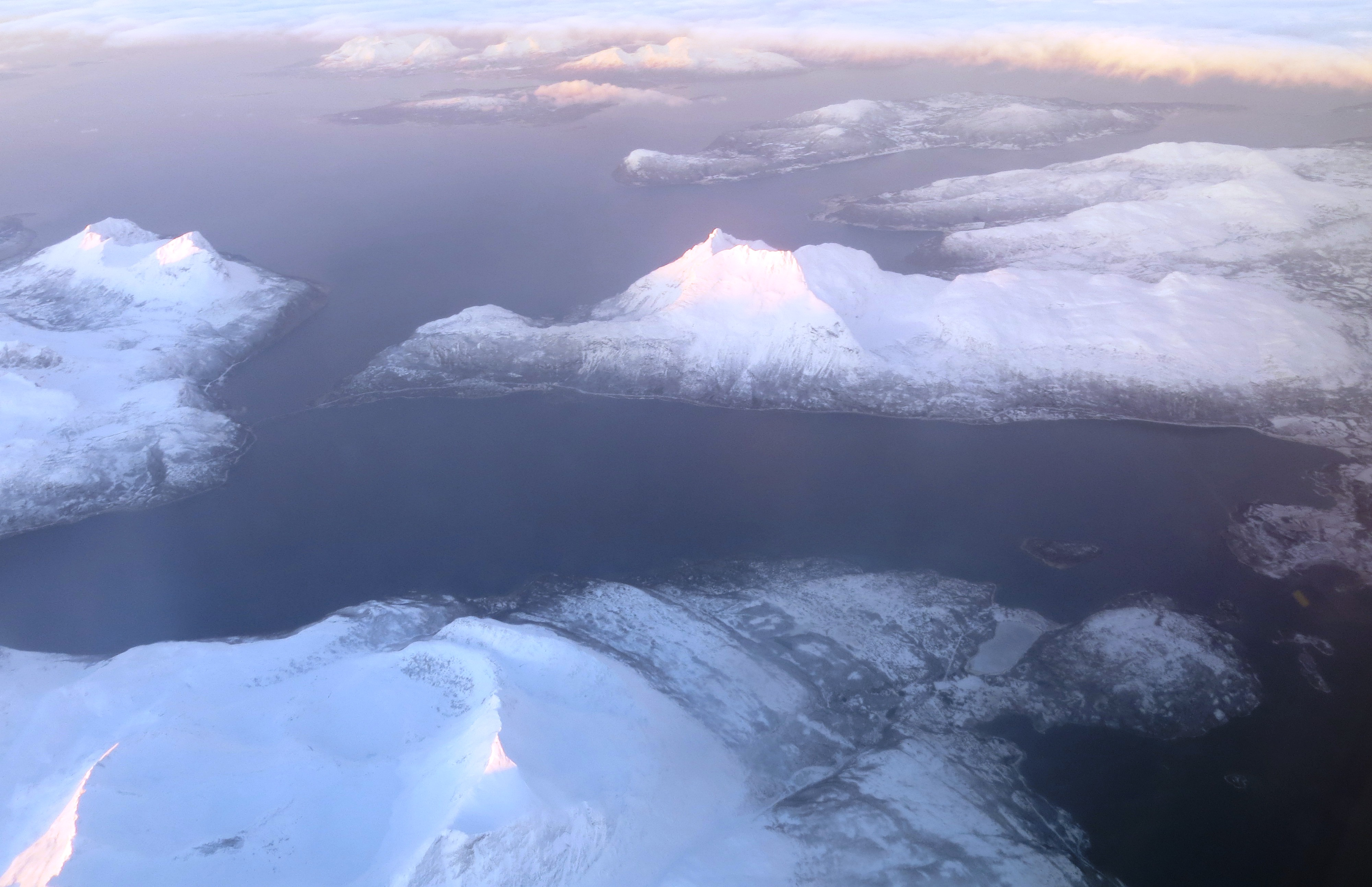
- View of the fjord from Mjøsundet to Salangsverket
- Interactive map of the fjord
- Location: Troms county, Norway
- Coordinates: 68.8970°N 17.5766°E
- Type: Fjord
- Primary outflows: Astafjorden
- Basin countries: Norway
- Max. length: 18 kilometres (11 mi)

Salangen (Norwegian) or Siellakvuotna (Northern Sami) is a fjord in Salangen Municipality and Ibestad Municipality in Troms county, Norway. The 18-kilometre (11 mi) fjord flows to the northeast from the Astafjorden and then turns to the southeast until it reaches the village of Sjøvegan at the head of the fjord. The innermost part of the fjord is also named the Sagfjorden.
