= Sjøvegan =

Village in Salangen Municipality, Norway

- Village
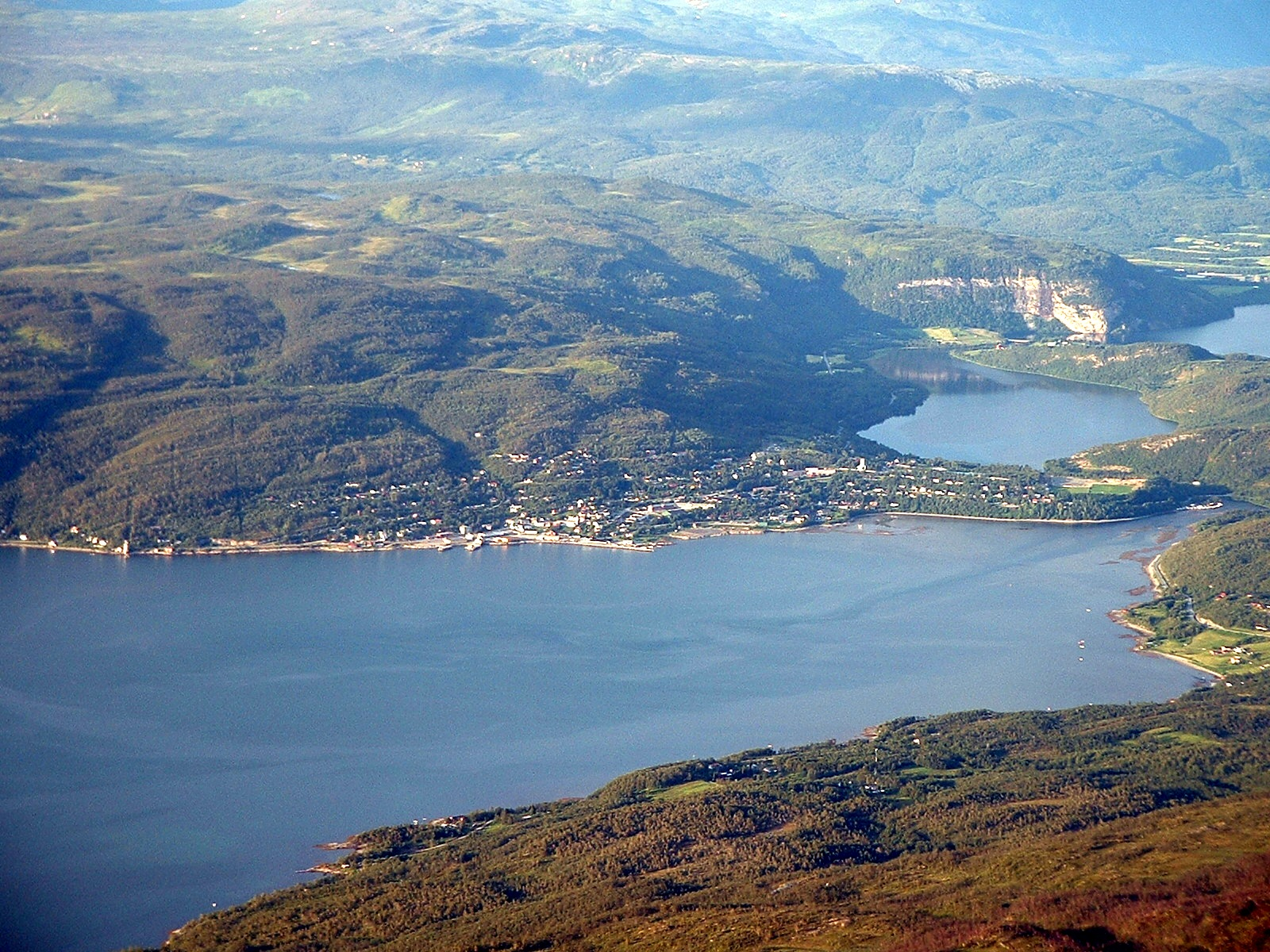
- View of the village
- Interactive map of Sjøvegan
- Location within Troms Location within Norway
- Coordinates: 68°52′25″N 17°50′49″E
- Country: Norway
- Region: Northern Norway
- County: Troms
- District: Hålogaland
- Municipality: Salangen Municipality

Area
  - Total: 0.81 km^{2} (0.31 sq mi)
- Elevation: 38 m (125 ft)

Population (2023)
  - Total: 770
  - Density: 951/km^{2} (2,460/sq mi)
- Time zone: UTC+01:00 (CET)
  - Summer (DST): UTC+02:00 (CEST)
- Post Code: 9350 Salangen

Sjøvegan is the administrative centre of Salangen Municipality in Troms county, Norway. The village is located at the end of the Sagfjorden, a branch of the Salangen fjord. The river Salangselva empties into the fjord at Sjøvegan. The river flows through the lakes Nervatnet and Øvrevatnet just to the east of the village.

The village is located about 17 kilometres (11 mi) east of European route E6. The nearby town of Setermoen in Bardu Municipality is 25 kilometres (16 mi) east of Sjøvegan and the village of Laberget is located about 3.5 kilometres (2.2 mi) southwest of Sjøvegan.

The 0.81-square-kilometre (200-acre) village has a population (2023) of 770 and a population density of 951 inhabitants per square kilometre (2,460/sq mi). The home venue of the Salangen IF team is located in Sjøvegan. Salangen Church is also located in the village.

== Name ==
The name is the plural of "Sjøveg" which means vei ned til sjøen or "the way down to the sea".

== Media gallery ==
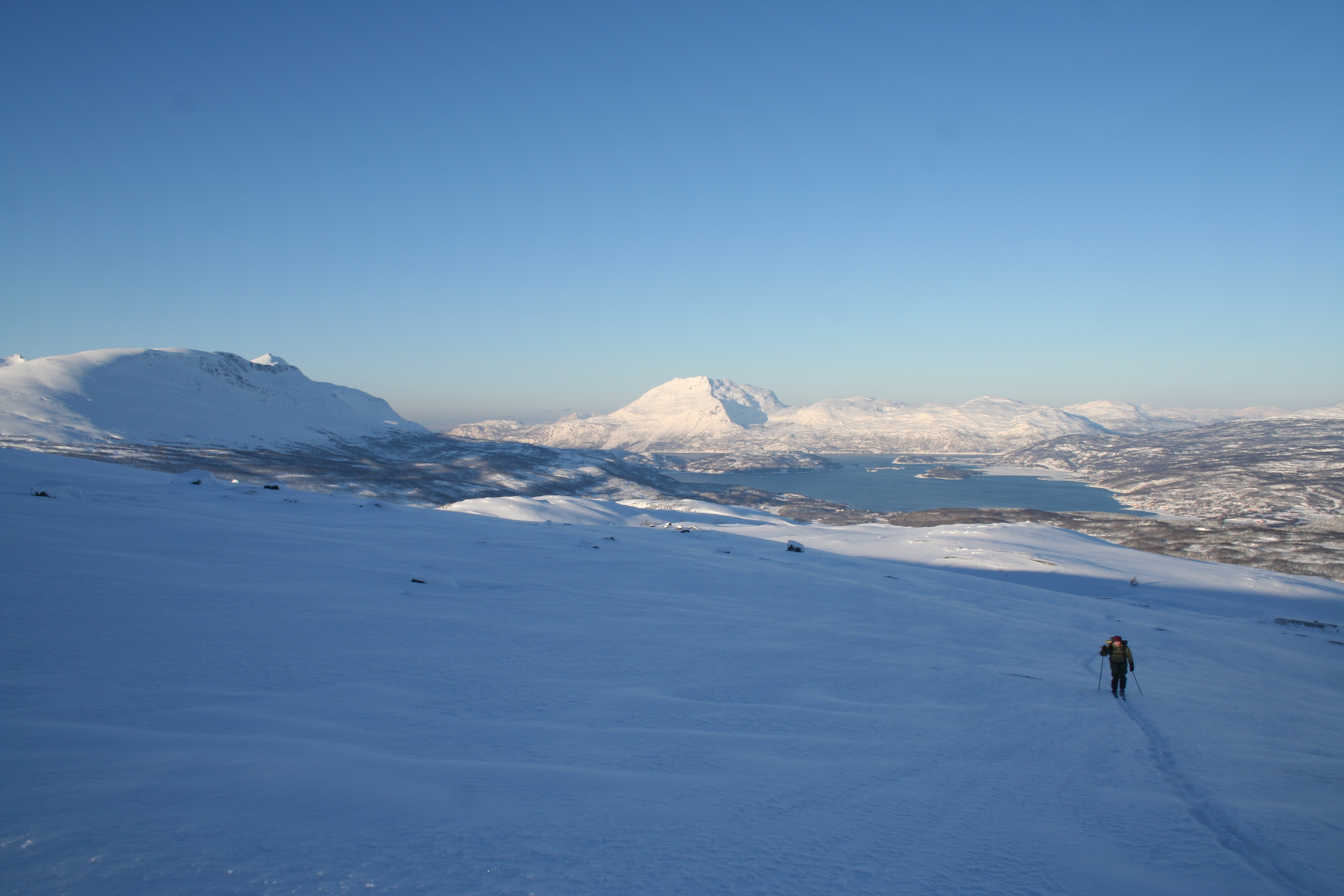
Sjøvegan on the right side

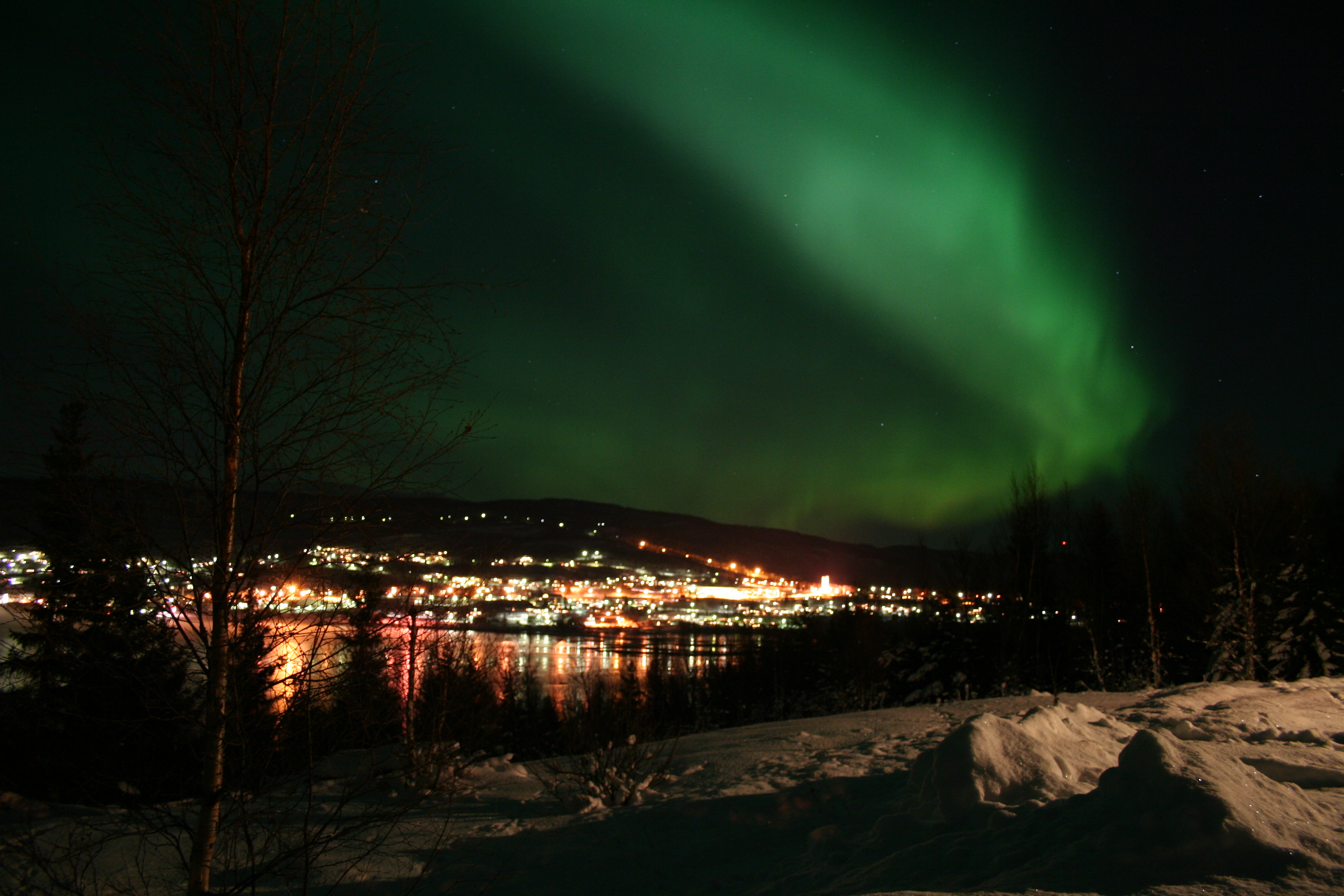
Sjøvegan at night

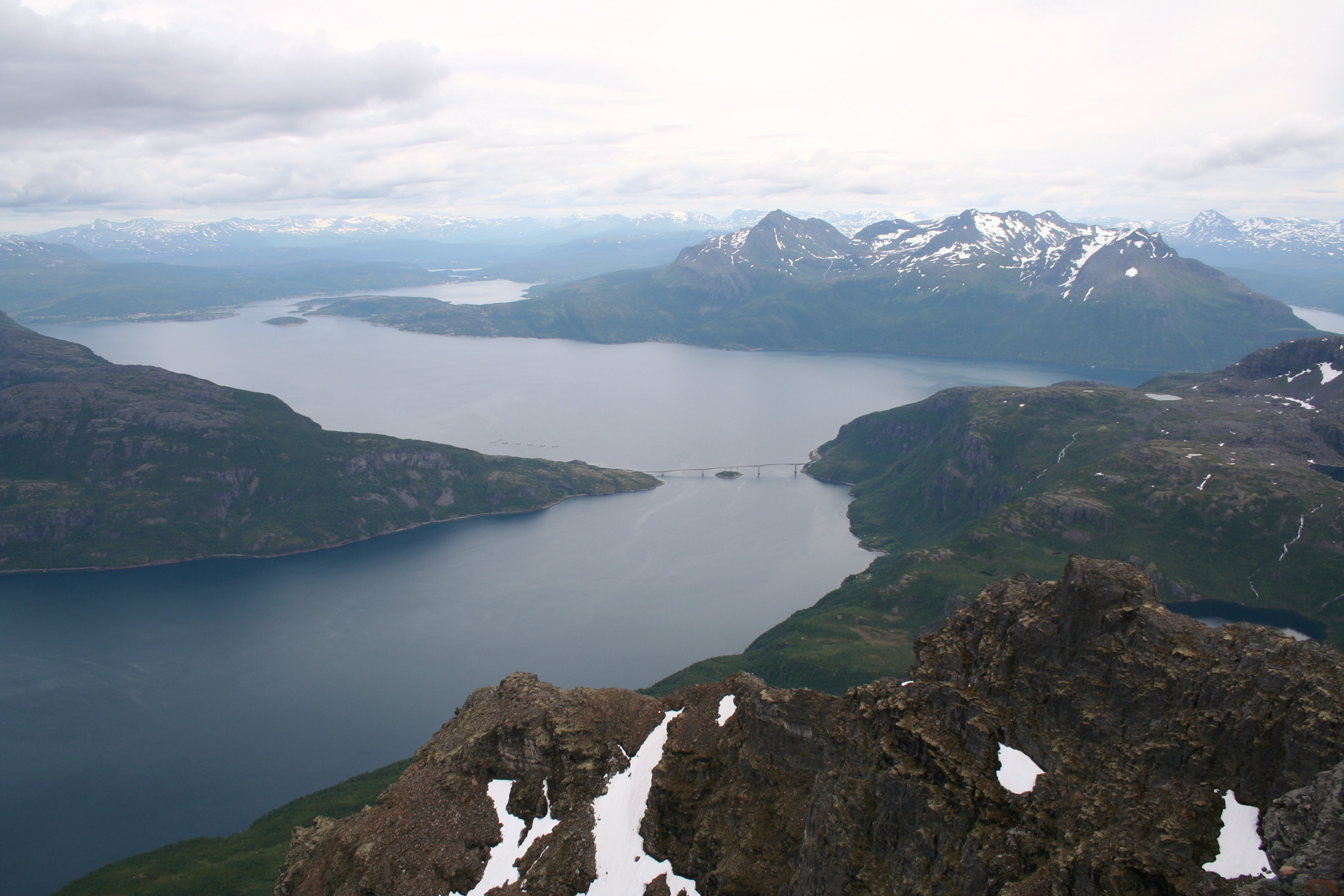
Fjord leading to Sjøvegan (innermost part of the fjord)
