= Geavdnjajávri =

Lake in Bardu, Norway

- Interactive map of the lake
- Location: Troms
- Coordinates: 68.5039°N 19.3481°E
- Primary outflows: Gulmmaeeatnu
- Catchment area: Målselva
- Basin countries: Norway
- Max. length: 13 kilometres (8.1 mi)
- Max. width: 2.5 kilometres (1.6 mi)
- Surface area: 18.85 km^{2} (7.28 sq mi)
- Shore length^{1}: 34.4 kilometres (21.4 mi)
- Surface elevation: 540 metres (1,770 ft)
- References: NVE
- ^{1} Shore length is not a well-defined measure.

Geavdnjajávri is a lake in Bardu Municipality in Troms county, Norway. It is located inside Rohkunborri National Park, just 3.5 km (2.2 mi) from the border with Sweden. The lake has an area of 18.85 km^{2} (7.28 sq mi) and is 540 m (1,770 ft) above sea level.

The lake empties in the river Gulmmaeeatnu, which flows into the lake Leinavatn, then to the lake Altevatnet. Altevatnet empties into the river Barduelva which flows into the river Målselva.
