= Salangsdalen =

Valley in Troms, Norway

Salangsdalen (Norwegian); Njuorjovuopmi (Northern Sami); Njuorjovuovdi (Northern Sami)
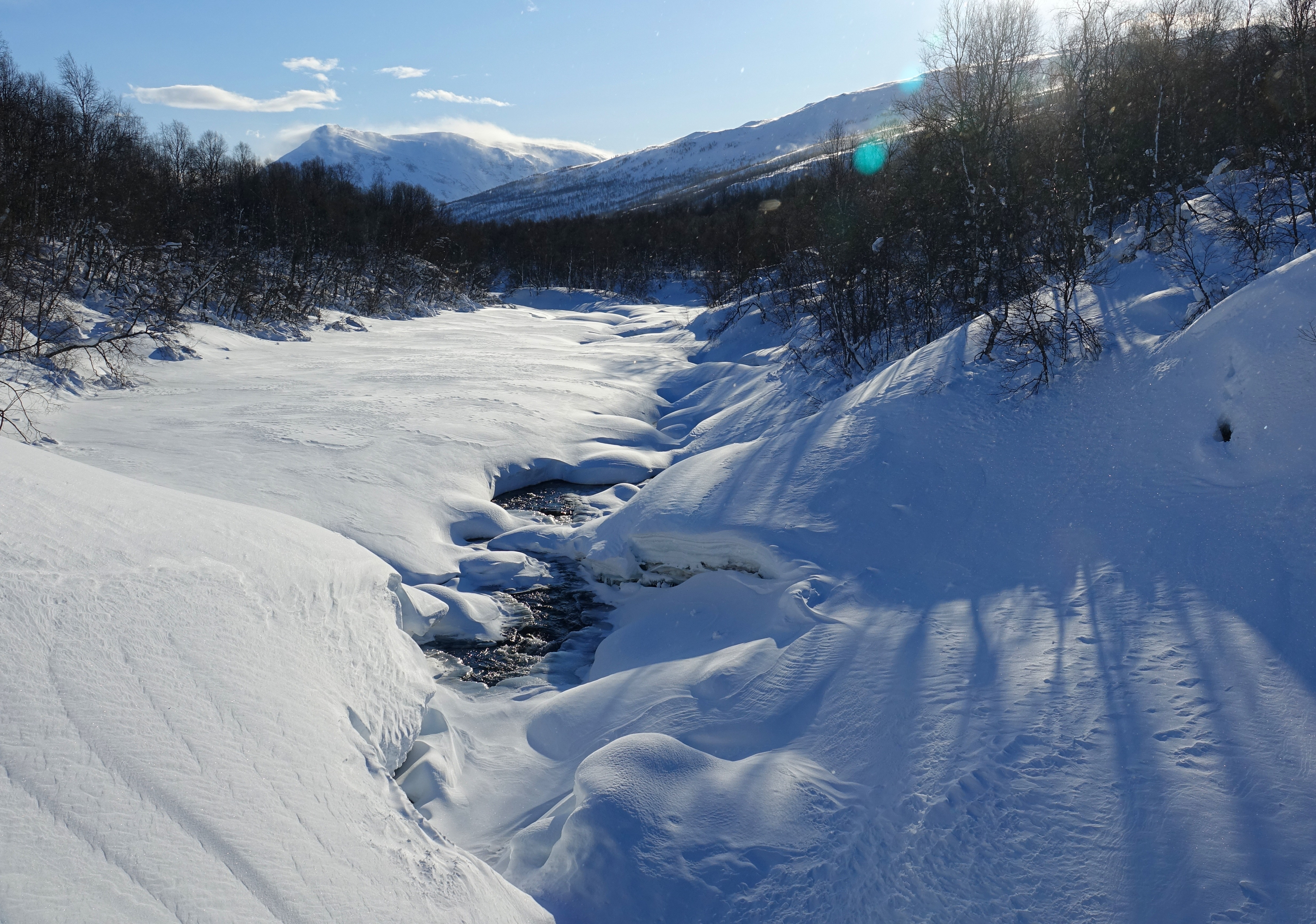
- Salangsdalen in early March
- Floor elevation: 201 m (659 ft)
- Length: 30 kilometres (19 mi) North-South
- Width: 2 to 4 kilometres (1.2 to 2.5 mi)

Geology
- Type: River valley

Geography
- Location: Troms, Norway
- Coordinates: 68°40′45″N 18°07′18″E

Location
- Interactive map of the valley

Salangsdalen (Norwegian) or Njuorjovuopmi or Njuorjovuovdi (Northern Sami) is a river valley in Bardu Municipality in Troms county, Norway. The river Salangselva flows north through the valley. The valley ends in the middle of Bardu, near the town of Setermoen.

The European route E6 highway runs north and south through the valley. The Polar Park is located in Salangsdalen—it is known as the northernmost zoo in the world. The Salangsdalen Chapel is located in the southern part of the valley. Rohkunborri National Park lies just east of the valley.
