= Nedre Bardu Chapel =

- Nedre Bardu kapell
- Nedre Bardu Chapel
- 69.007001°N 18.52560°E
- Location: Bardu Municipality, Troms
- Country: Norway
- Denomination: Church of Norway
- Churchmanship: Evangelical Lutheran

History
- Status: Chapel
- Founded: 1981
- Consecrated: 1981

Architecture
- Functional status: Active
- Architect: Eva Østgård
- Architectural type: Long church
- Completed: 1981 (45 years ago)

Specifications
- Capacity: 120
- Materials: Wood

Administration
- Diocese: Nord-Hålogaland
- Deanery: Senja prosti
- Parish: Bardu

Nedre Bardu Chapel (Norwegian: Nedre Bardu kapell) is a chapel of the Church of Norway in Bardu Municipality in Troms county, Norway. It is located along the Barduelva river in northern Bardu, about 18 kilometres (11 mi) north of Setermoen and about 10 kilometres (6.2 mi) south of Bardufoss. It is an annex chapel for the Bardu parish, part of the Senja prosti (deanery) in the Diocese of Nord-Hålogaland. The brown, wooden chapel was built in a long church style in 1981 using plans drawn up by the architect Eva Østgård. The chapel seats about 120 people.

== See also ==
- List of churches in Nord-Hålogaland
