= Rohkunborri National Park =

National park in Norway

- IUCN category II (national park)
- Interactive map of Rohkunborri National Park
- Location: Troms, Norway
- Nearest city: Setermoen
- Coordinates: 68°33′54″N 18°51′56″E
- Area: 571 km^{2} (220 sq mi)
- Established: 2011

Rohkunborri National Park (Norwegian: Rohkunborri nasjonalpark, Northern Sami: Rohkunborri álbmotmeahcci) is a national park in Troms county, Norway, that was established in 2011. The park consists of a 571-square-kilometre (220 sq mi) protected area, and is located in Bardu Municipality along the border with Sweden, about 30 kilometres (19 mi) southeast of the village of Setermoen and about 50 kilometres (31 mi) northeast of the town of Narvik.

Rohkunborri borders on the Swedish Vadvetjåkka National Park to the south, and it is located less than 10 kilometres (6.2 mi) south of Øvre Dividal National Park. The park includes parts of the Sørdalen valley (canyon), the large lake Geavdnjajávri, and the mountain Rohkunborri. The large lakes Altevatnet and Leinavatnet both lie just north of the park boundary.

The nature varies from rich boreal deciduous forest on the lower elevations to alpine tundra higher up. The park is home to brown bears, wolverines, and lynx, as well as the snowy owl, gyrfalcon, and reindeer (with Sami owners). There are also wetlands and alpine vegetation on bedrock rich in lime, as well as bogs. The Arctic rhododendron (no:Lapprose) is present. The lakes in the eastern part have Arctic char. The mountains on both sides of the canyon reach up to 1,500 metres (4,900 ft) above sea level.

== Gallery ==
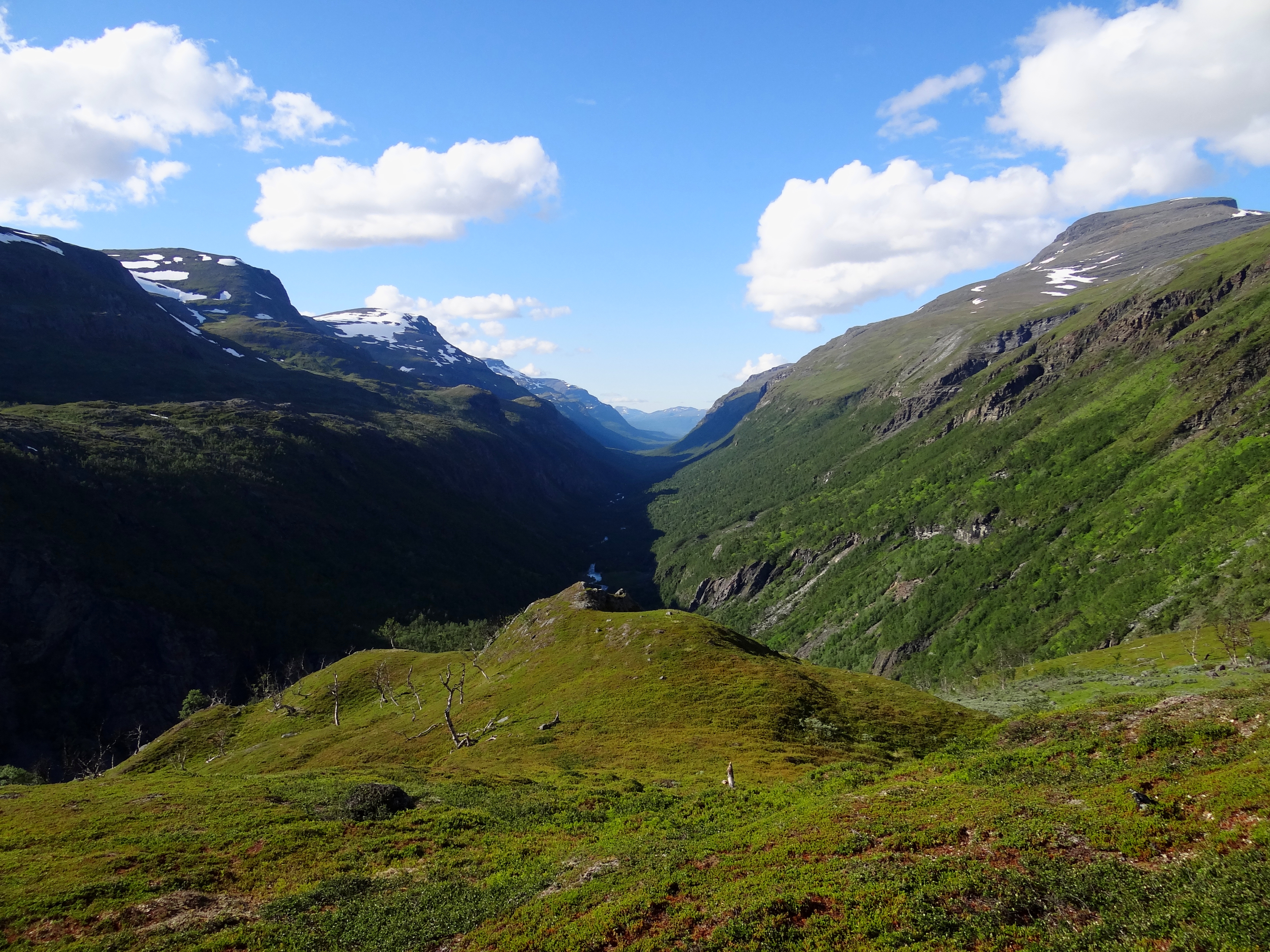
Sørdalen valley (canyon)

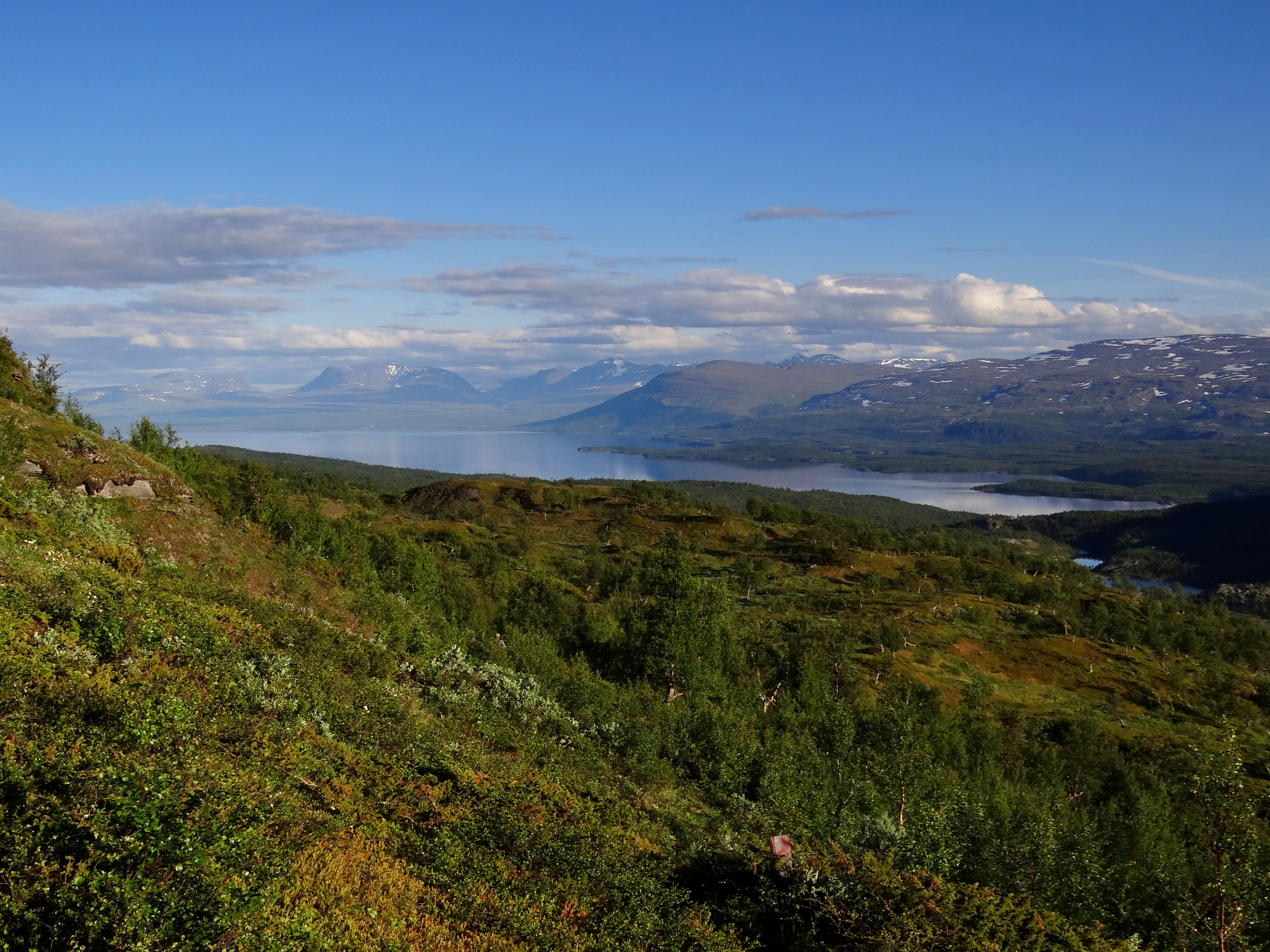
Rohkunborri is located adjacent to Sweden, near the large lake Torneträsk

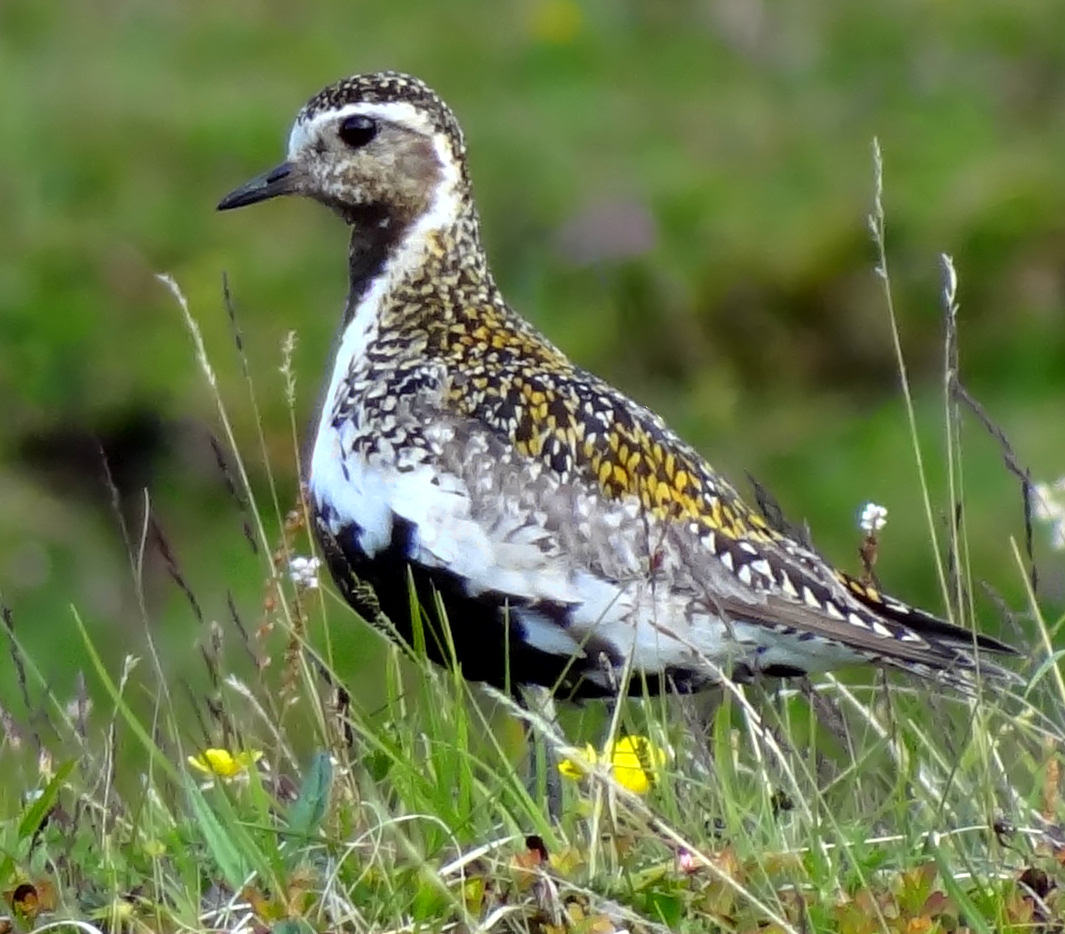
Golden Plover in Rohkunborri
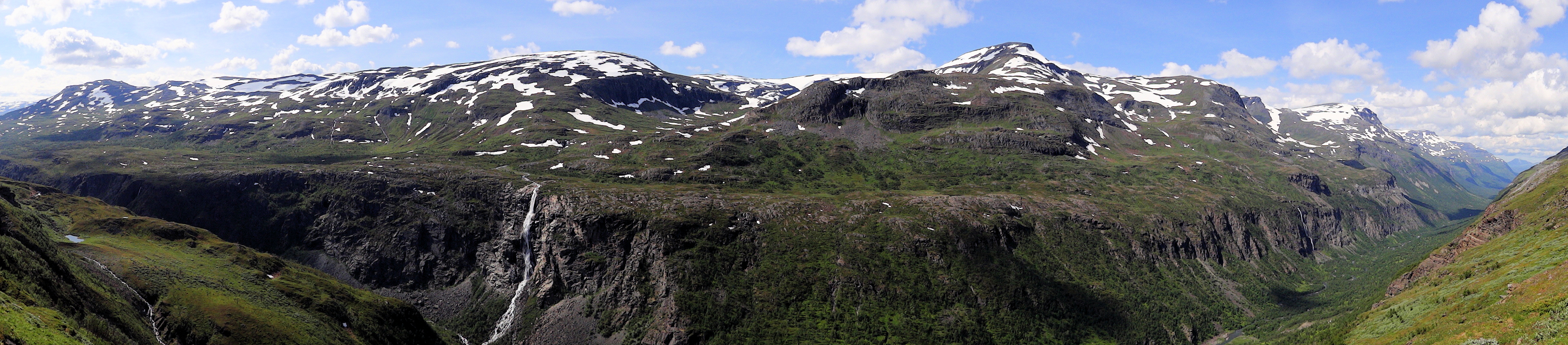
Panorama showing much of the Sørdalen canyon seen from the east
