= Salangsdalen Chapel =

- Salangsdalen kapell
- Salangsdalen Chapel
- 68.697972°N 18.1056752°E
- Location: Bardu Municipality, Troms
- Country: Norway
- Denomination: Church of Norway
- Churchmanship: Evangelical Lutheran

History
- Status: Chapel
- Founded: 1981
- Consecrated: 1981

Architecture
- Functional status: Active
- Architect(s): Dalsbø and Østgård
- Architectural type: Long church
- Completed: 1981 (45 years ago)

Specifications
- Capacity: 110
- Materials: Wood

Administration
- Diocese: Nord-Hålogaland
- Deanery: Senja prosti
- Parish: Bardu
- Norwegian Cultural Heritage Site
- Type: Church
- Status: Not protected
- ID: 85359

Salangsdalen Chapel (Norwegian: Salangsdalen kapell) is a chapel of the Church of Norway in Bardu Municipality in Troms county, Norway. It is located in the southern part of Bardu in the Salangsdalen valley, just east of the European route E06 highway and not far from the Polar Park. It is an annex chapel for the Bardu parish which is part of the Senja prosti (deanery) in the Diocese of Nord-Hålogaland. The brown, wooden church was built in 1981 using plans drawn up by the architects Dalsbø and Østgård. The church seats about 110 people.

== See also ==
- List of churches in Nord-Hålogaland
