= Alfred Henningsen =

Norwegian politician (1918–2012)

Alfred Meyer Henningsen (26 April 1918 – 12 September 2012) was a Norwegian military officer and politician for the Labour Party. He was introduced to spying and military service in World War II, and made this his career path after the war as well. He was mayor of Bardu Municipality and a three-term member of the Parliament of Norway.

== Early life ==
He was born in Sør-Varanger Municipality as a son of fisherman Martin Henningsen (1873–1954) and his wife Hilda Marie Rydning (1888–1964). He had a politicized childhood, and Ellisif Wessel was a family friend. He became politically active in the interwar period and joined the Workers' Youth League. He finished middle school in 1937, and enrolled at the Norwegian 6th Division Under-Officers' Training School in 1938. From 1943 he attended a teacher's college in Tromsø.

== World War II ==
At that time Norway was occupied by Germany as a part of World War II. Together with Torstein Raaby, Henningsen was recruited as a Soviet spy with connections to Murmansk. It only took a few months before the Gestapo tracked them down, and they both had to flee the country. Via Sweden, Henningsen went to England where he received telegraphy training as well as commando-style training in melee combat.

In total he had four stays in Norway. One time he barely survived a submarine wrecking. On the last journey he participated in the liberation of Northern Norway, where Norwegian troops cooperated with the Red Army. The Germans used the scorched earth tactic as they retreated south. One day, Henningsen travelled down the Porsangerfjord in a small boat, which German troops managed to board. After discarding the radio transmitter, Henningsen plunged into the water, was shot, managed to swim ashore but was captured here and taken prisoner-of-war. He spent some weeks imprisoned at Akershus Fortress before Victory in Europe Day. In 1945 he was decorated with the Defence Medal 1940–1945, the St. Olav's Medal With Oak Branch and British decorations. Two Russian decorations followed in 1968 and 1994.

== Post-war life ==
After the war his career took a military path. He served as aide-de-camp in Finnmark from 1947 to 1948 and captain in Troms from 1948 to 1954, except for 1950 to 1951 when he served in the Independent Norwegian Brigade Group in Germany. He headed Infantry Regiment 16 (IR16) from 1954 to 1956, and was then promoted to lieutenant colonel and head of the local Home Guard. He retired from that position in 1974.

Henningsen became acquainted with Thor Heyerdahl during the liberation of Northern Norway, and in 1947 he was asked to join the Heyerdahl-led Kon-Tiki expedition. He declined due to his forthcoming marriage. Torstein Raaby was chosen instead.

=== Politics ===
Henningsen was mayor of Bardu Municipality during the terms 1955–1959, 1959–1962 and 1975–1979. From 1955 to 1962 he was also a member of Troms county council. He was elected to the Parliament of Norway from Troms in 1961, and was re-elected on two occasions. His main political interest lay in improving the communication systems in Troms county. He received some attention in his 1961 electoral campaign when he fell off a wharf on the island of Senja.

Henningsen has stated that he originally was uninterested in Parliament, but accepted the party nomination when it came. He has referred to the Parliament as "the loony bin", and was reputed for not following the political mainstream. In 1972 he supported the possible Norwegian membership in the European Communities, against the overwhelming opinion of his county Troms. His reasoning was grounded in uniting Europe to avoid more conflicts. In 1983 he resigned his membership in the Labour Party.

He also had a rather unsuccessful attempt to import muskox to Troms, serving as board chairman of the company Norsk Moskus from 1969 to 1980. He was also a board member of Nordisk Polarinvest from 1983 to 1988 and executive of the Svea-based company Tundra from 1984 to 1988. In 1989 the book Partisan og politiker was released; told by Alfred Henningsen and penned by Hans Christian Finstad. He has resided in Setermoen since 1951. He died at Barduheimen in September 2012.
