= Ingeborg Arvola =

Norwegian novelist and children's writer

- Born: 7 July 1974 (age 52); Honningsvåg, Norway
- Occupation: Writer
- Mother: Liv Lundberg
- Awards: Cappelen Prize (2004); Brage Prize (2022)

Ingeborg Arvola (born 7 July 1974) is a Norwegian novelist and children's writer.

== Career ==
Arvola made her literary debut in 1999 with the novel Korallhuset. Among her later novels are Straffe from 2003, Forsiktig glass from 2004, and 40 postkort from 2007. She was awarded the Cappelen Prize in 2004, and Havmannprisen in 2009. She received the Brage Prize in 2022, for her book Kniven i ilden. Ruijan rannalla – Sanger fra Ishavet.

== Books ==
- 1999 - The Coral House - Novel
- 2000 - Blood, Snot, and Tears - Children's book
- 2000 - Life in a Turtle Shell and Other Stories - Stories
- 2003 - Punishment - Novel
- 2004 - Fragile Glass - Novel
- 2006 - Monster Rider - Short story collection
- 2007 - 40 Postcards - Prose
- 2008 - No Days Without Rain - Children's book
- 2009 - Comet Companions and Moon Smiles - Children's book
- 2011 - Pig Hearts - Novel
- 2012 - Carla, My Carla - Young adult book
- 2013 - Over All Obstacles - Children's book
- 2014 - Inghill + Carla = True - Young adult novel
- 2015 - The Rumor - Young adult novel
- 2015 - Neiden 1970 - Novel
- 2018 - Conditions for Life - Novel
- 2019 - Buffy By Is Talented - Young adult novel
- 2019 - Sudden Warm Temperatures - Short story collection
- 2020 - Buffy By Is Inspired - Young adult novel
- 2020 - Vodka, Water, and Glasnost - Stage scripts
- 2021 - Buffy By Is Adventurous - Young adult novel
- 2022 - Kniven i ilden. Ruijan rannalla – Sanger fra Ishavet - Novel

== Personal life ==
Arvola was born in Honningsvåg on 7 July 1974. She is a daughter of poet and translator Liv Lundberg.
