= Bardu Municipality =

Municipality in Troms, Norway

Bardu Municipality Bardu kommune Beardu suohkan (Northern Sami) Perttulan komuuni (Kven)
- Municipality
- Bardo herred (historic name); Bardodalen herred (historic name)
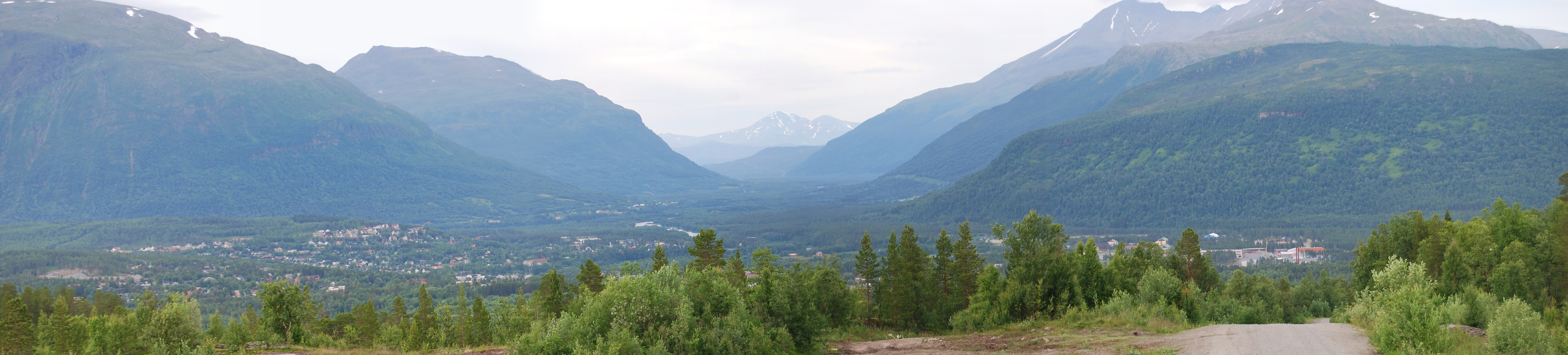
- Panorama of the village of Setermoen

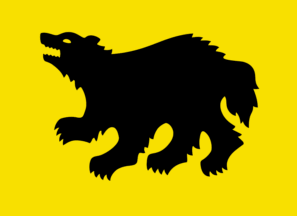
- Flag Coat of arms

- Troms within Norway

- Bardu within Troms
- Coordinates: 68°51′51″N 18°21′10″E
- Country: Norway
- County: Troms
- District: Midt-Troms
- Established: 1854
  - Preceded by: Ibestad Municipality
- Administrative centre: Setermoen

Government
  - Mayor (2015): Toralf Heimdal (Sp)

Area
  - Total: 2,703.89 km^{2} (1,043.98 sq mi)
  - Land: 2,513.62 km^{2} (970.51 sq mi)
  - Water: 190.27 km^{2} (73.46 sq mi) 7%
  - Rank: #18 in Norway
- Highest elevation: 1,660.61 m (5,448.2 ft)

Population (2024)
  - Total: 3,986
  - Rank: #203 in Norway
  - Density: 1.5/km^{2} (3.9/sq mi)
  - Change (10 years): ▲ +0.03%
- Demonym: Bardudøl

Official language
  - Norwegian form: Neutral
- Time zone: UTC+01:00 (CET)
  - Summer (DST): UTC+02:00 (CEST)
- ISO 3166 code: NO-5520
- Website: Official website

Bardu (Northern Sami: Beardu suohkan and Kven: Perttulan komuuni) is a municipality in Troms county, Norway. The administrative centre of the municipality is the village of Setermoen, the largest urban area in the municipality.

The 2,704-square-kilometre (1,044 sq mi) municipality is the 18th largest by area out of the 357 municipalities in Norway. Bardu is the 203rd most populous municipality in Norway with a population of 3,986. The municipality's population density is 1.5 inhabitants per square kilometre (3.9/sq mi) and its population has increased by 0.03% over the previous 10-year period.

Norway's largest military garrison is located at Setermoen. The military is the municipality's largest employer and more than 1,000 young soldiers perform their duty service here each year. The world's most northern zoo, Polar Park, is located in the southern part of the municipality.

== General information ==
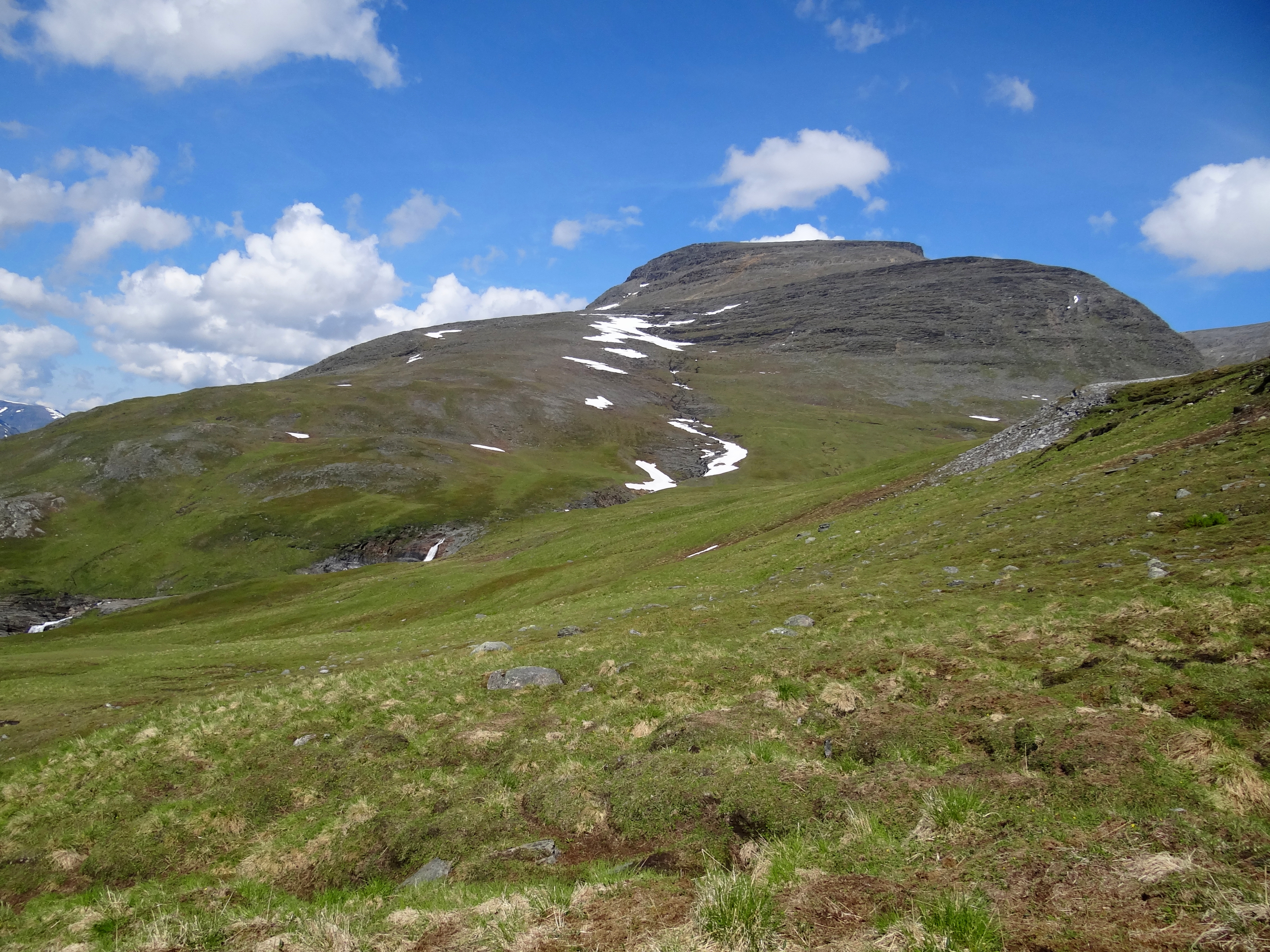
View of the Kjeleelvtinden mountain

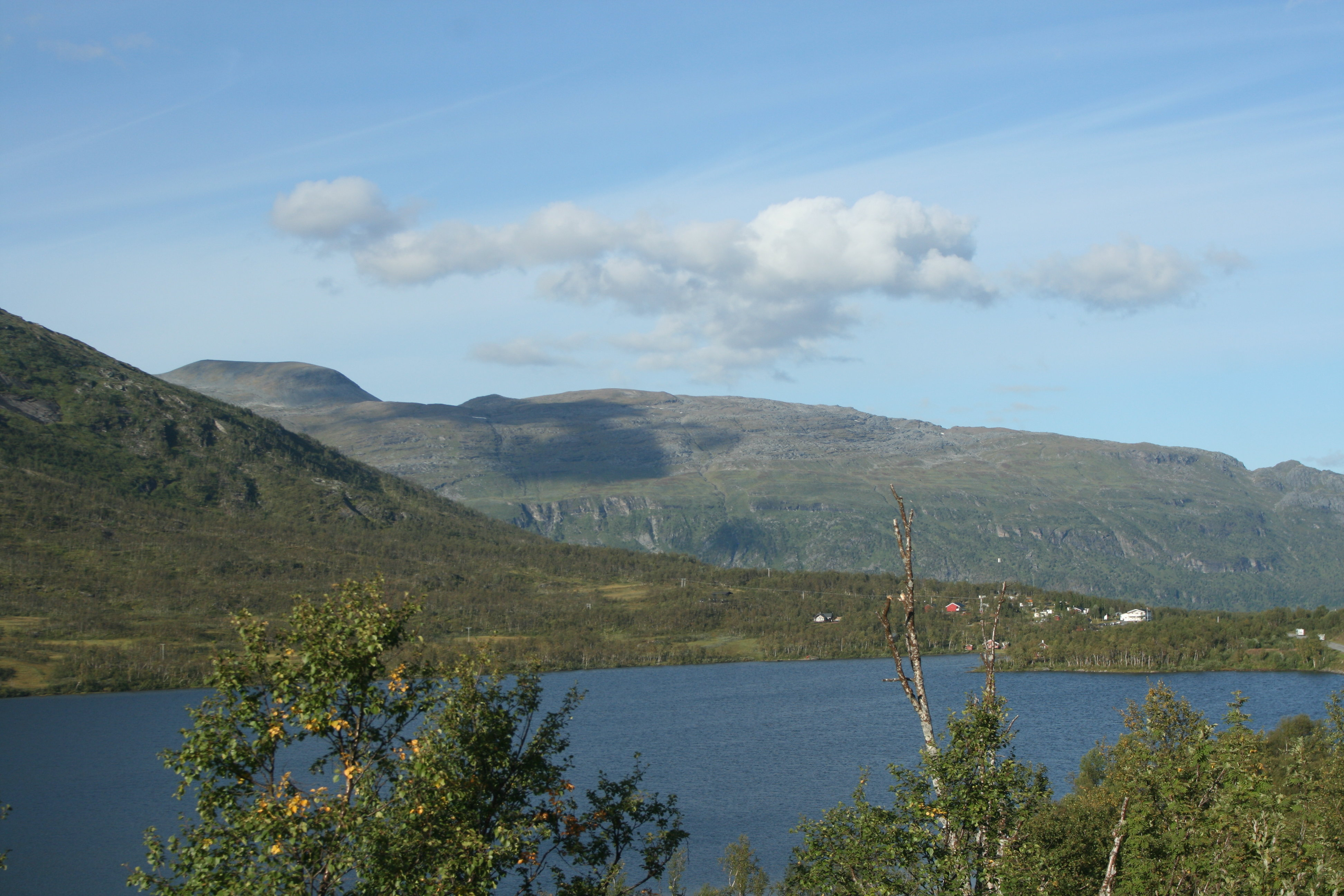
View of Bardu

The municipality of Bardodalen was established in 1854 when the eastern part of the old Ibestad Municipality was separated to form the new municipality. The initial population of the new municipality was 757. The municipal borders have not changed since then, although the name was later changed to Bardu.

On 1 January 2020, the municipality became part of the newly formed Troms og Finnmark county. Previously, it had been part of the old Troms county. On 1 January 2024, the Troms og Finnmark county was divided and the municipality once again became part of Troms county.

=== Name ===
The municipality has had several name variations since its establishment in 1854. Initially, the name was Bardodalen from 1854 until 1889. In 1889, the name was shortened to Bardo. On 6 January 1908, a royal resolution changed the spelling of the name of the municipality to Bardu. The root of the name is possibly a Norwegianized form of the Sámi name Beardu. The meaning of the Sámi name is probably "long and steep mountain side". The original suffix of the name, dalen means "the valley", thus the name was "the valley of Bardo". An alternate explanation is that "Bardo" is a corruption of the old Norwegian male name Berto or Berdo (Old Norse: Bergþórr).

=== Coat of arms ===
The coat of arms was granted on 6 June 1980. The official blazon is "Or, a wolverine statant sable" (Norwegian: I gull en gående svart jerv.). This means the arms have a charge that is a wolverine which has a tincture of sable. The field (background) has a tincture of Or which means it is commonly colored yellow, but if it is made out of metal, then gold is used. The wolverine was chosen as a symbol for the large forests and the rich wildlife in the municipality. There is a permanent population of wolverines living in the extensive forests and mountain areas of Bardu. The motif also expresses strength and continuity. The arms were designed by Arvid Sveen.

=== Churches ===
The Church of Norway has one parish (sokn) within Bardu Municipality. It is part of the Indre Troms prosti (deanery) in the Diocese of Nord-Hålogaland.

Churches in Bardu Municipality
Parish (sokn)	Church name	Location of the church	Year built
Bardu	Bardu Church	Setermoen	1829
Bardu	Nedre Bardu Chapel	Brandmoen	1981
Bardu	Øvre Bardu Chapel	Sørdalen	1971
Bardu	Salangsdalen Chapel	Salangsdalen	1981

== Government ==
Bardu Municipality is responsible for primary education (through 10th grade), outpatient health services, senior citizen services, welfare and other social services, zoning, economic development, and municipal roads and utilities. The municipality is governed by a municipal council of directly elected representatives. The mayor is indirectly elected by a vote of the municipal council. The municipality is under the jurisdiction of the Nord-Troms og Senja District Court and the Hålogaland Court of Appeal.

=== Municipal council ===
The municipal council (Kommunestyre) of Bardu Municipality is made up of 19 representatives that are elected to four year terms. The tables below show the current and historical composition of the council by political party.

Bardu kommunestyre 2023–2027
Party name (in Norwegian)	Number of representatives
Labour Party (Arbeiderpartiet)	3
Progress Party (Fremskrittspartiet)	1
Conservative Party (Høyre)	3
Centre Party (Senterpartiet)	9
Socialist Left Party (Sosialistisk Venstreparti)	2
Liberal Party (Venstre)	1
Total number of members:	19

Bardu kommunestyre 2019–2023
Party name (in Norwegian)	Number of representatives
Labour Party (Arbeiderpartiet)	4
Conservative Party (Høyre)	2
Centre Party (Senterpartiet)	12
Liberal Party (Venstre)	1
Total number of members:	19

Bardu kommunestyre 2015–2019
Party name (in Norwegian)	Number of representatives
Labour Party (Arbeiderpartiet)	7
Progress Party (Fremskrittspartiet)	1
Conservative Party (Høyre)	4
Centre Party (Senterpartiet)	6
Liberal Party (Venstre)	1
Total number of members:	19

Bardu kommunestyre 2011–2015
Party name (in Norwegian)	Number of representatives
Labour Party (Arbeiderpartiet)	13
Progress Party (Fremskrittspartiet)	1
Conservative Party (Høyre)	7
Centre Party (Senterpartiet)	3
Liberal Party (Venstre)	1
Total number of members:	25

Bardu kommunestyre 2007–2011
Party name (in Norwegian)	Number of representatives
Labour Party (Arbeiderpartiet)	7
Progress Party (Fremskrittspartiet)	3
Conservative Party (Høyre)	4
Centre Party (Senterpartiet)	9
Socialist Left Party (Sosialistisk Venstreparti)	1
Liberal Party (Venstre)	1
Total number of members:	25

Bardu kommunestyre 2003–2007
Party name (in Norwegian)	Number of representatives
Labour Party (Arbeiderpartiet)	8
Progress Party (Fremskrittspartiet)	2
Conservative Party (Høyre)	4
Centre Party (Senterpartiet)	7
Socialist Left Party (Sosialistisk Venstreparti)	2
Liberal Party (Venstre)	1
Bardu Independent Election List (Bardu Uavhengige Folkevalgte)	1
Total number of members:	25

Bardu kommunestyre 1999–2003
Party name (in Norwegian)	Number of representatives
Labour Party (Arbeiderpartiet)	8
Conservative Party (Høyre)	8
Centre Party (Senterpartiet)	6
Socialist Left Party (Sosialistisk Venstreparti)	1
Liberal Party (Venstre)	1
Bardu local list (Bardu bygdeliste)	1
Total number of members:	25

Bardu kommunestyre 1995–1999
Party name (in Norwegian)	Number of representatives
Labour Party (Arbeiderpartiet)	9
Conservative Party (Høyre)	8
Centre Party (Senterpartiet)	6
Socialist Left Party (Sosialistisk Venstreparti)	1
Bardu local list (Bardu Bygdeliste)	1
Total number of members:	25

Bardu kommunestyre 1991–1995
Party name (in Norwegian)	Number of representatives
Labour Party (Arbeiderpartiet)	8
Progress Party (Fremskrittspartiet)	1
Conservative Party (Høyre)	8
Centre Party (Senterpartiet)	6
Socialist Left Party (Sosialistisk Venstreparti)	2
Total number of members:	25

Bardu kommunestyre 1987–1991
Party name (in Norwegian)	Number of representatives
Labour Party (Arbeiderpartiet)	10
Conservative Party (Høyre)	9
Centre Party (Senterpartiet)	5
Socialist Left Party (Sosialistisk Venstreparti)	1
Total number of members:	25

Bardu kommunestyre 1983–1987
Party name (in Norwegian)	Number of representatives
Labour Party (Arbeiderpartiet)	11
Conservative Party (Høyre)	5
Christian Democratic Party (Kristelig Folkeparti)	1
Centre Party (Senterpartiet)	7
Socialist Left Party (Sosialistisk Venstreparti)	1
Total number of members:	25

Bardu kommunestyre 1979–1983
Party name (in Norwegian)	Number of representatives
Labour Party (Arbeiderpartiet)	10
Conservative Party (Høyre)	7
Christian Democratic Party (Kristelig Folkeparti)	1
Centre Party (Senterpartiet)	6
Socialist Left Party (Sosialistisk Venstreparti)	1
Total number of members:	25

Bardu kommunestyre 1975–1979
Party name (in Norwegian)	Number of representatives
Labour Party (Arbeiderpartiet)	12
Conservative Party (Høyre)	5
Christian Democratic Party (Kristelig Folkeparti)	1
Centre Party (Senterpartiet)	6
Socialist Left Party (Sosialistisk Venstreparti)	1
Total number of members:	25

Bardu kommunestyre 1971–1975
Party name (in Norwegian)	Number of representatives
Labour Party (Arbeiderpartiet)	11
Conservative Party (Høyre)	2
Centre Party (Senterpartiet)	7
Liberal Party (Venstre)	1
Total number of members:	21

Bardu kommunestyre 1967–1971
Party name (in Norwegian)	Number of representatives
Labour Party (Arbeiderpartiet)	11
Conservative Party (Høyre)	3
Centre Party (Senterpartiet)	6
Liberal Party (Venstre)	1
Total number of members:	21

Bardu kommunestyre 1963–1967
Party name (in Norwegian)	Number of representatives
Labour Party (Arbeiderpartiet)	12
Conservative Party (Høyre)	3
Centre Party (Senterpartiet)	5
Liberal Party (Venstre)	1
Total number of members:	21

Bardu herredsstyre 1959–1963
Party name (in Norwegian)	Number of representatives
Labour Party (Arbeiderpartiet)	12
Conservative Party (Høyre)	2
Centre Party (Senterpartiet)	5
Liberal Party (Venstre)	1
Local List(s) (Lokale lister)	1
Total number of members:	21

Bardu herredsstyre 1955–1959
Party name (in Norwegian)	Number of representatives
Labour Party (Arbeiderpartiet)	11
Conservative Party (Høyre)	2
Joint List(s) of Non-Socialist Parties (Borgerlige Felleslister)	8
Total number of members:	21

Bardu herredsstyre 1951–1955
Party name (in Norwegian)	Number of representatives
Labour Party (Arbeiderpartiet)	7
Joint List(s) of Non-Socialist Parties (Borgerlige Felleslister)	9
Total number of members:	16

Bardu herredsstyre 1947–1951
Party name (in Norwegian)	Number of representatives
Labour Party (Arbeiderpartiet)	8
Joint List(s) of Non-Socialist Parties (Borgerlige Felleslister)	8
Total number of members:	16

Bardu herredsstyre 1945–1947
Party name (in Norwegian)	Number of representatives
Labour Party (Arbeiderpartiet)	9
Local List(s) (Lokale lister)	7
Total number of members:	16

Bardu herredsstyre 1937–1941*
Party name (in Norwegian)	Number of representatives
Labour Party (Arbeiderpartiet)	7
Joint List(s) of Non-Socialist Parties (Borgerlige Felleslister)	9
Total number of members:	16
Note: Due to the German occupation of Norway during World War II, no elections were held for new municipal councils until after the war ended in 1945.

=== Mayors ===
The mayor (Norwegian: ordfører) of Bardu Municipality is the political leader of the municipality and the chairperson of the municipal council. Here is a list of people who have held this position:

- 1854–1875: Peder Andersen
- 1875–1883: Morten O. Lundberg
- 1883–1888: Erik Forsæth
- 1888–1890: Peder P. Strømsmo
- 1890–1911: Ole M. Hansen Kroken
- 1911–1916: Peder M. Hasvold
- 1916–1922: Ludvig Lande
- 1922–1929: Olav Foshaug (Bp)
- 1929–1943: Johan P. Hasvold (Bp)
- 1943–1945: Olaf Aspelund
- 1945–1950: Ingebrigt M. Riise (Ap)
- 1950–1954: Einar Bjørnsen (V)
- 1955–1961: Alfred Henningsen (Ap)
- 1961–1967: Ola Tønseth (Ap)
- 1967–1975: Peder J. Evensgård (Ap)
- 1975–1979: Alfred Henningsen (Ap)
- 1980–1988: Reidar Kroken (Sp)
- 1988–1991: Bjørn Espenes (H)
- 1991–1995: Bjarne Kollstrøm (H)
- 1995–1999: Ragnhild Movinkel (Sp)
- 1999–2003: Roald Linaker (Ap)
- 2003–2011: Oddvar Bjørnsen (Sp)
- 2011–2015: Arne Nysted (Ap)
- 2015–present: Toralf Heimdal (Sp)

== Geography ==
Bardu borders Lavangen Municipality and Salangen Municipality to the west, Målselv Municipality to the north, Narvik Municipality (in Nordland county) to the south, and Sweden to the east. The Barduelva river runs through the municipality from south to north along the Bardudalen valley. The Salangsdalen valley is located along the western part of the municipality. The largest lake in the county, Altevatnet, is located in the eastern part of the municipality, near the smaller lakes Geavdnjajávri and Leinavatn. These lakes lie in and near Rohkunborri National Park. The highest point in the municipality is the 1,660.61-metre (5,448.2 ft) tall mountain Rohkunborri, also located within Rohkunborri National Park.

=== Climate ===
Bardu, although not far from the coast, is known for its cold winters compared to the coastal areas. This is caused by mountains usually blocking the milder, coastal air from reaching the Bardu valley. In summer, however, it is usually warmer than the coastal areas.

Climate data for Setermoen
Month	Jan	Feb	Mar	Apr	May	Jun	Jul	Aug	Sep	Oct	Nov	Dec	Year
Daily mean °C (°F)	−10.3 (13.5)	−8.8 (16.2)	−5.3 (22.5)	−0.2 (31.6)	5.6 (42.1)	10.6 (51.1)	13.1 (55.6)	11.5 (52.7)	6.4 (43.5)	1.2 (34.2)	−5.2 (22.6)	−8.8 (16.2)	0.8 (33.4)
Average precipitation mm (inches)	73 (2.9)	67 (2.6)	45 (1.8)	42 (1.7)	35 (1.4)	49 (1.9)	69 (2.7)	79 (3.1)	79 (3.1)	106 (4.2)	75 (3.0)	78 (3.1)	797 (31.4)
Average precipitation days (≥ 1 mm)	11.2	11.8	9.6	8.8	8.0	9.7	12.4	13.2	13.7	13.9	11.8	12.6	136.7
Source: Norwegian Meteorological Institute

== Notable people ==
- Alfred Henningsen (1918–2012), a military officer, spy, politician, and Mayor of Bardu for over nine years; lived in Setermoen
- Liv Lundberg (1944 – 2022) a poet, novelist, essayist and translator
- Sissel Solbjørg Bjugn (1947 in Bardu – 2011), a poet and children's writer
- Regina Alexandrova (born 1967), a Norwegian politician and Bardu municipal councillor from 2007 to 2015

=== Sport ===
- Ole Hegge (1898 – 1994), a cross-country skier and ski jumper who was a silver medallist at the 1928 Winter Olympics
- Fred Børre Lundberg (born 1969), a Nordic combined performer won two team silver medals and one team gold medal at the 1992, 1994 and 1998 Winter Olympics and an individual gold at the 1994 Winter Olympics; raised in Bardufoss
- Kristian Hammer (born 1976), a Nordic combined skier who grew up in Setermoen
- Lars Erik Bjørnsen (born 1982), a handball player. He has played 75 matches for the Norway men's national handball team between 2003 and 2011.

== Media gallery ==
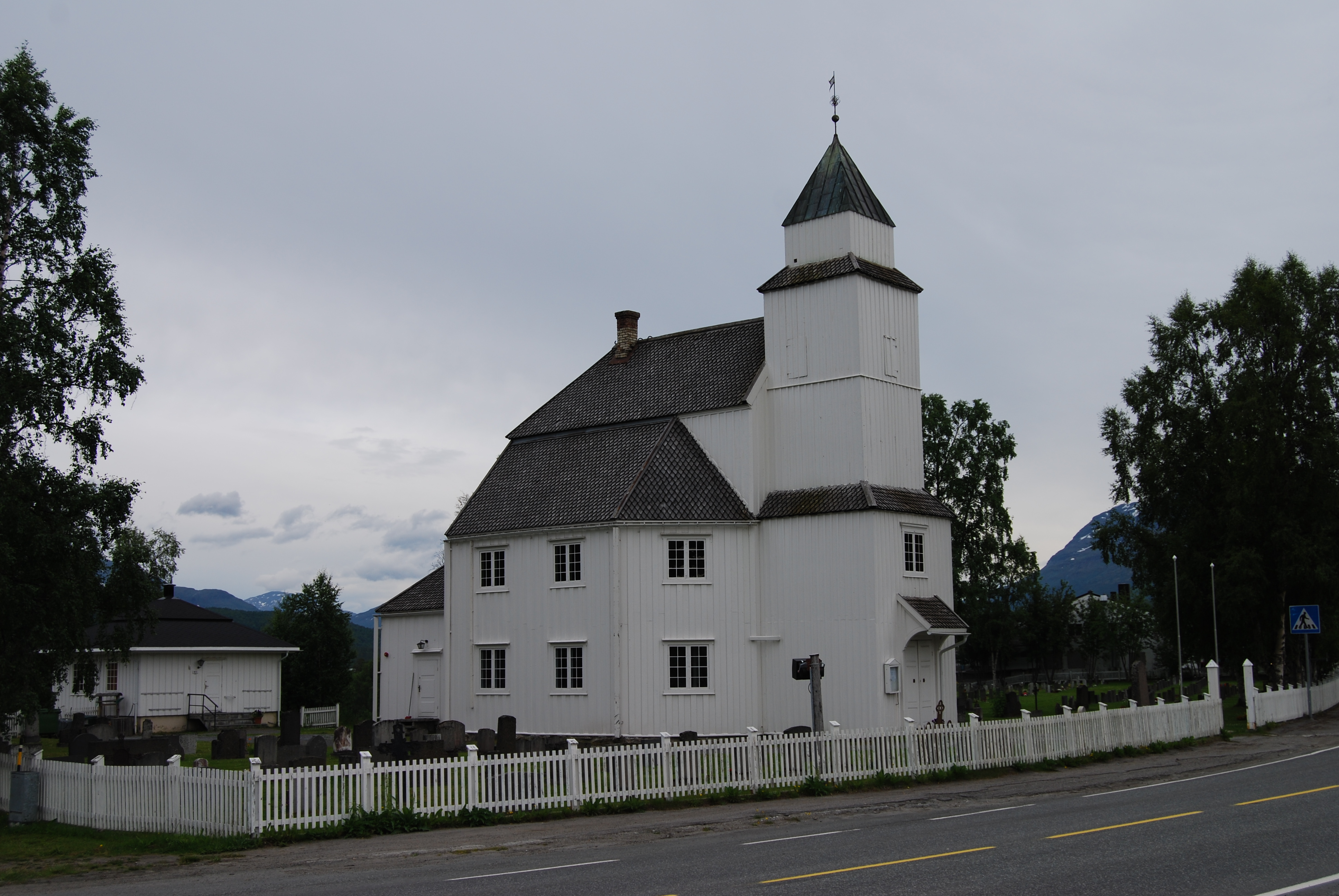
Bardu Church

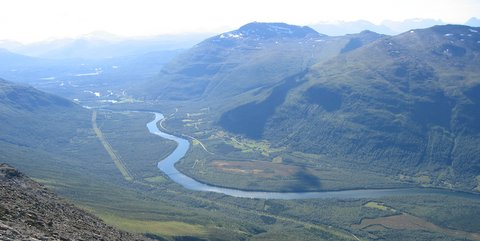
The Bardu valley and river seen from Istind in the direction of Setermoen

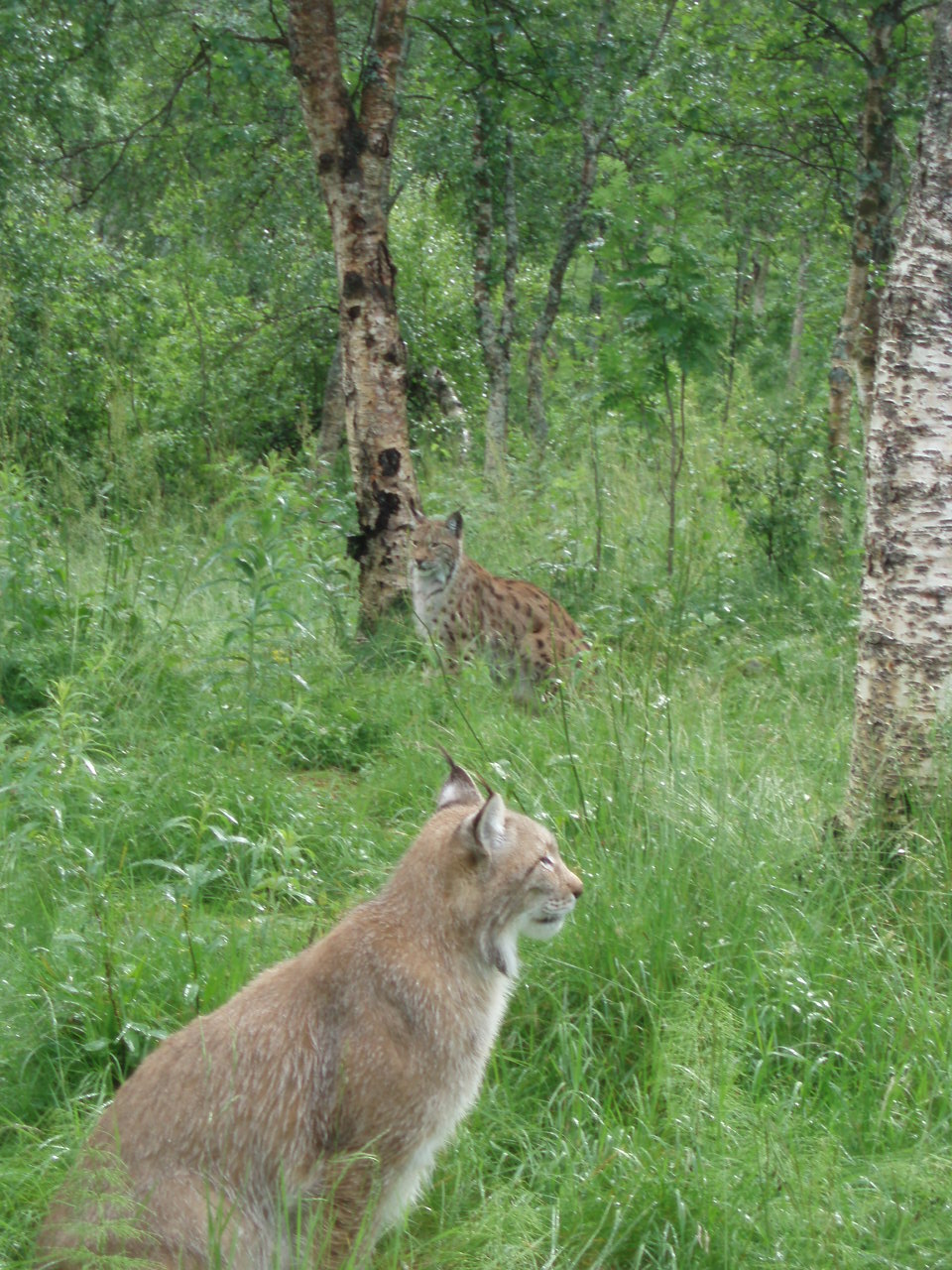
Lynx at the Polar Park in Bardu.
