= Øvre Bardu Chapel =

- Øvre Bardu kapell
- Øvre Bardu Chapel
- 68.7431026°N 18.552097°E
- Location: Bardu Municipality, Troms
- Country: Norway
- Denomination: Church of Norway
- Churchmanship: Evangelical Lutheran

History
- Status: Chapel
- Founded: 1971
- Consecrated: 1971

Architecture
- Functional status: Active
- Architect: Petter Bratli
- Architectural type: Long church
- Completed: 1971 (55 years ago)

Specifications
- Capacity: 200
- Materials: Wood

Administration
- Diocese: Nord-Hålogaland
- Deanery: Senja prosti
- Parish: Bardu
- Norwegian Cultural Heritage Site
- Type: Church
- Status: Not protected
- ID: 85924

Øvre Bardu Chapel (Norwegian: Øvre Bardu kapell) is a chapel of the Church of Norway in Bardu Municipality in Troms county, Norway. It is located along the Sørdalselva river in the Sørdalen valley in eastern Bardu. It is an annex chapel for the Bardu parish which is part of the Senja prosti (deanery) in the Diocese of Nord-Hålogaland. The white, wooden church was built in a long church style in 1971 using plans drawn up by the architect Petter Bratli. The church seats about 200 people.

== See also ==
- List of churches in Nord-Hålogaland
