= Bardu Church =

- Bardu kirke
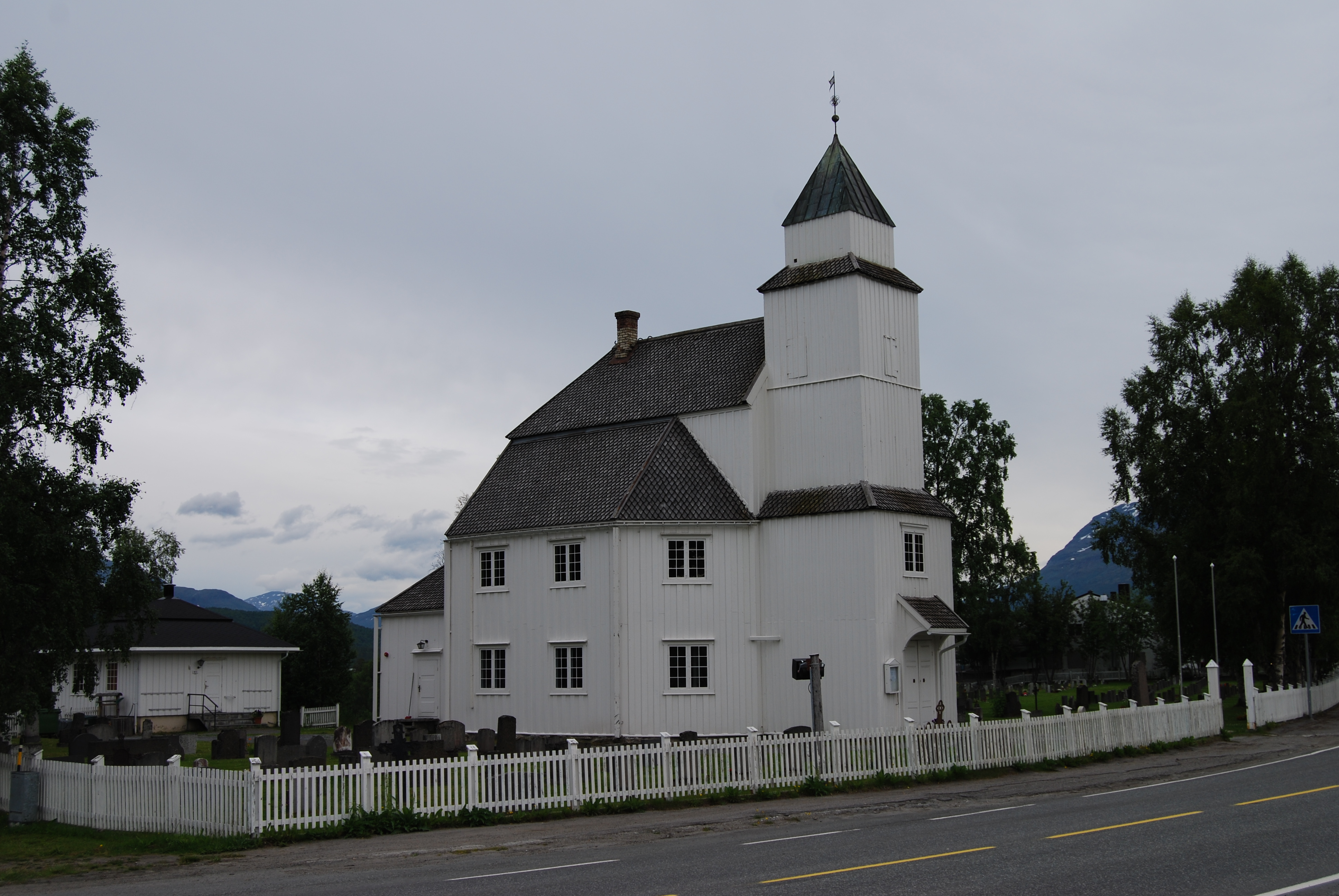
- View of the church
- Bardu Church
- 68.865059°N 18.346326°E
- Location: Bardu Municipality, Troms
- Country: Norway
- Denomination: Church of Norway
- Churchmanship: Evangelical Lutheran

History
- Status: Parish church
- Founded: 1829
- Consecrated: 1829

Architecture
- Functional status: Active
- Architect: Ole Olsen Lundberg
- Architectural type: Octagonal
- Completed: 1829 (197 years ago)

Specifications
- Capacity: 220
- Materials: Wood

Administration
- Diocese: Nord-Hålogaland
- Deanery: Senja prosti
- Parish: Bardu
- Norwegian Cultural Heritage Site
- Type: Church
- Status: Listed
- ID: 83853

Bardu Church (Norwegian: Bardu kirke) is a parish church of the Church of Norway in Bardu Municipality in Troms county, Norway. It is located in the village of Setermoen. It is the main church for the Bardu parish which is part of the Senja prosti (deanery) in the Diocese of Nord-Hålogaland. The white, octagonal, wooden church was built in a octagonal style in 1829 using plans drawn up by the architect Ole Olsen Lundberg. The church seats about 220 people.

Bardu Church was constructed from 1825-1829 and it was modeled after the Tynset Church in Hedmark county, but this one was built to a smaller scale. The church has an octagonal floor plan, a large square tower to the west, and a choir to the east. The exterior of the church is clad with vertical, white painted panels. The tower, which was not completed until 1840, has a pyramid-shaped roof.

== Media gallery ==
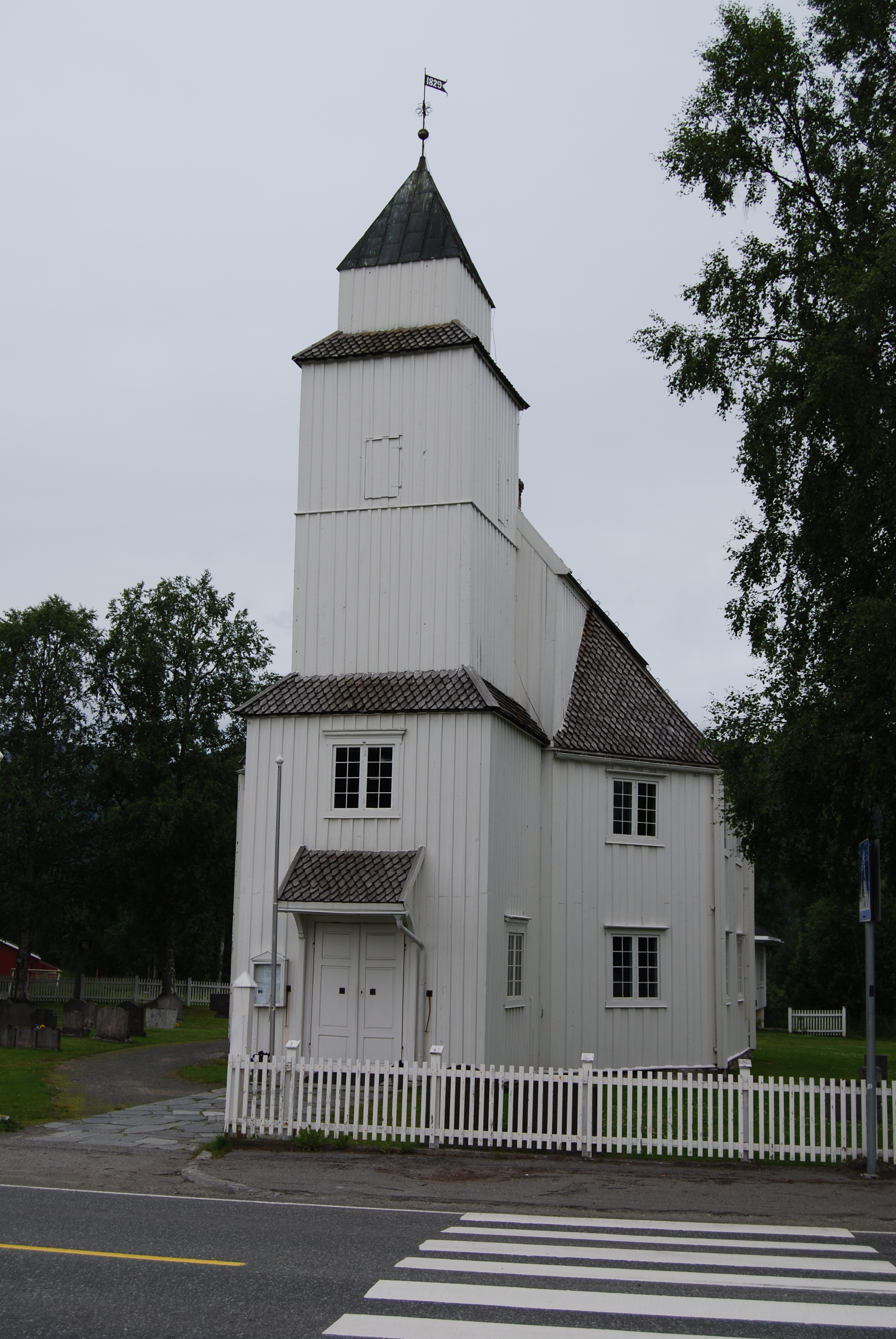

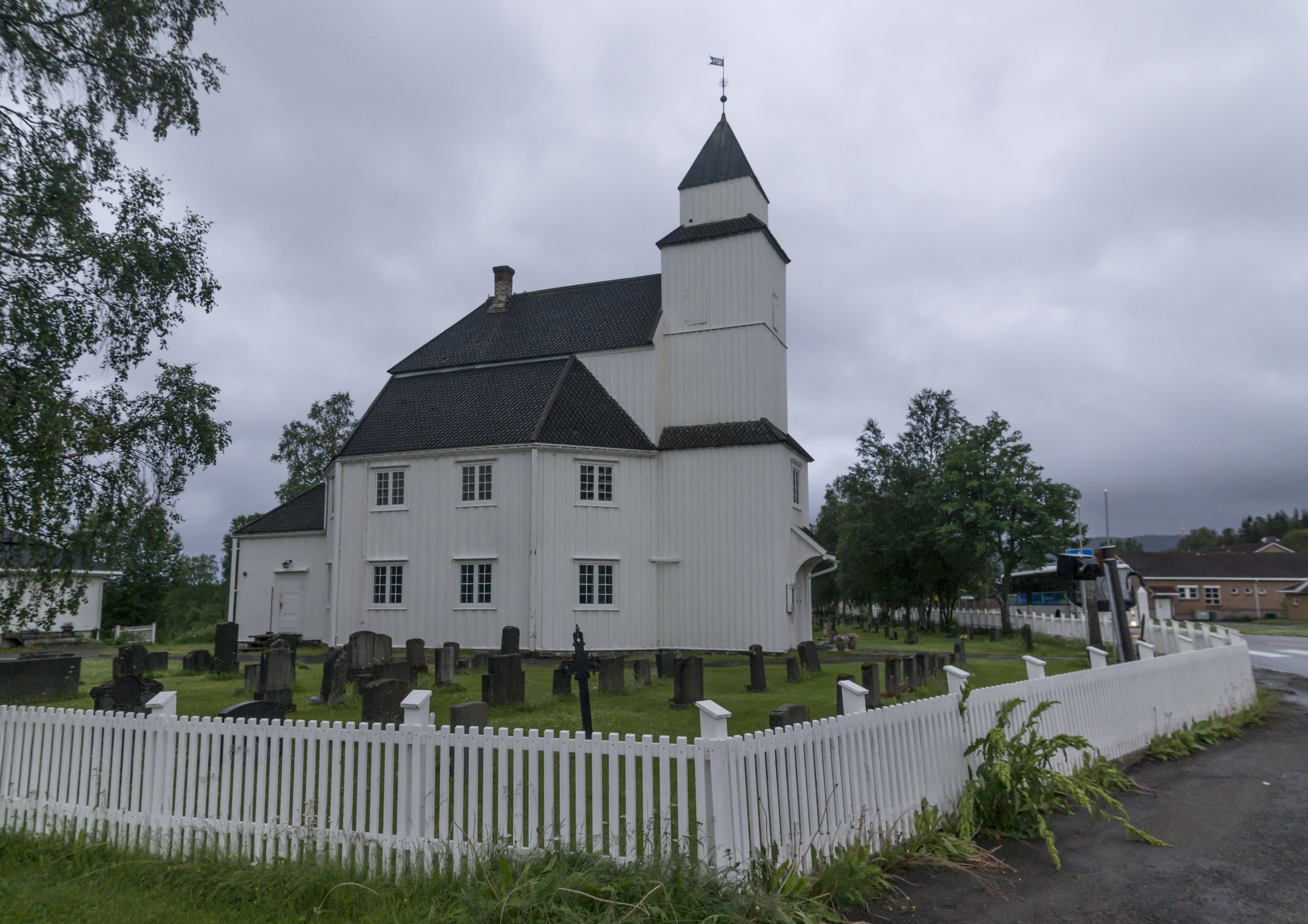

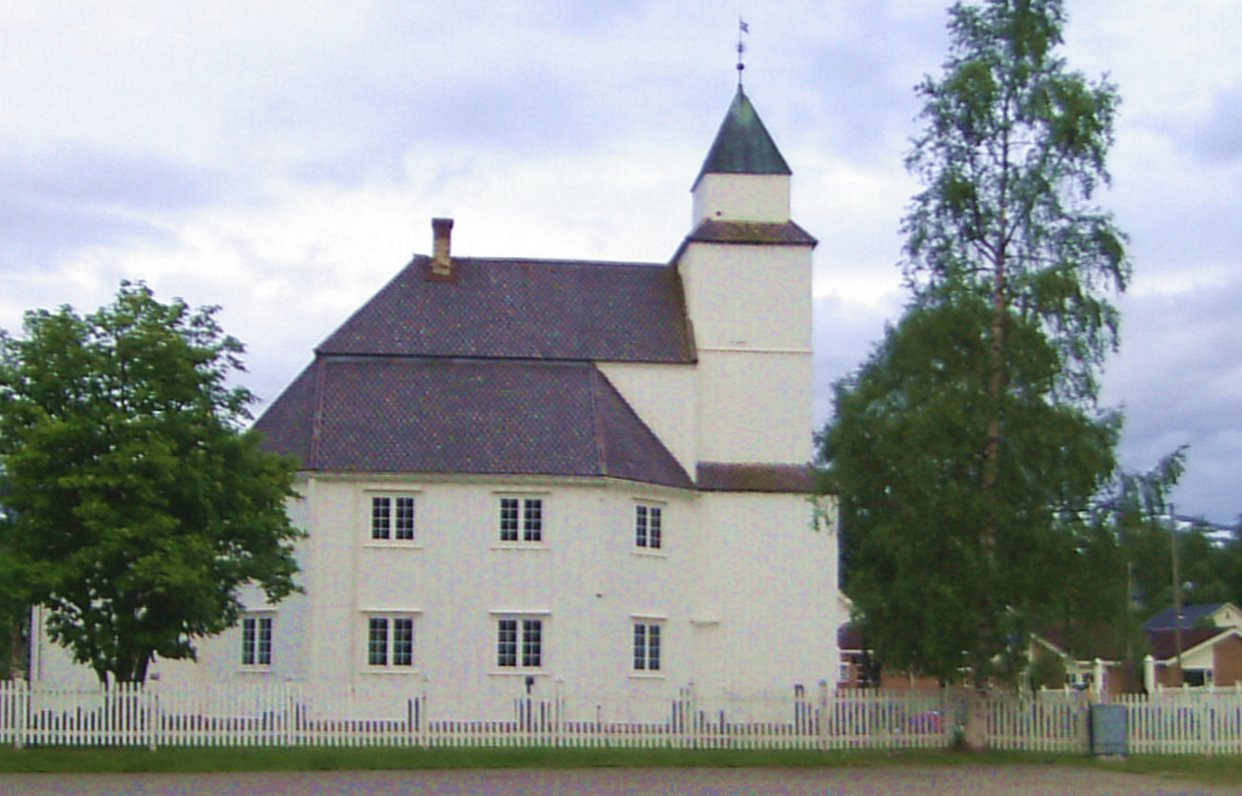

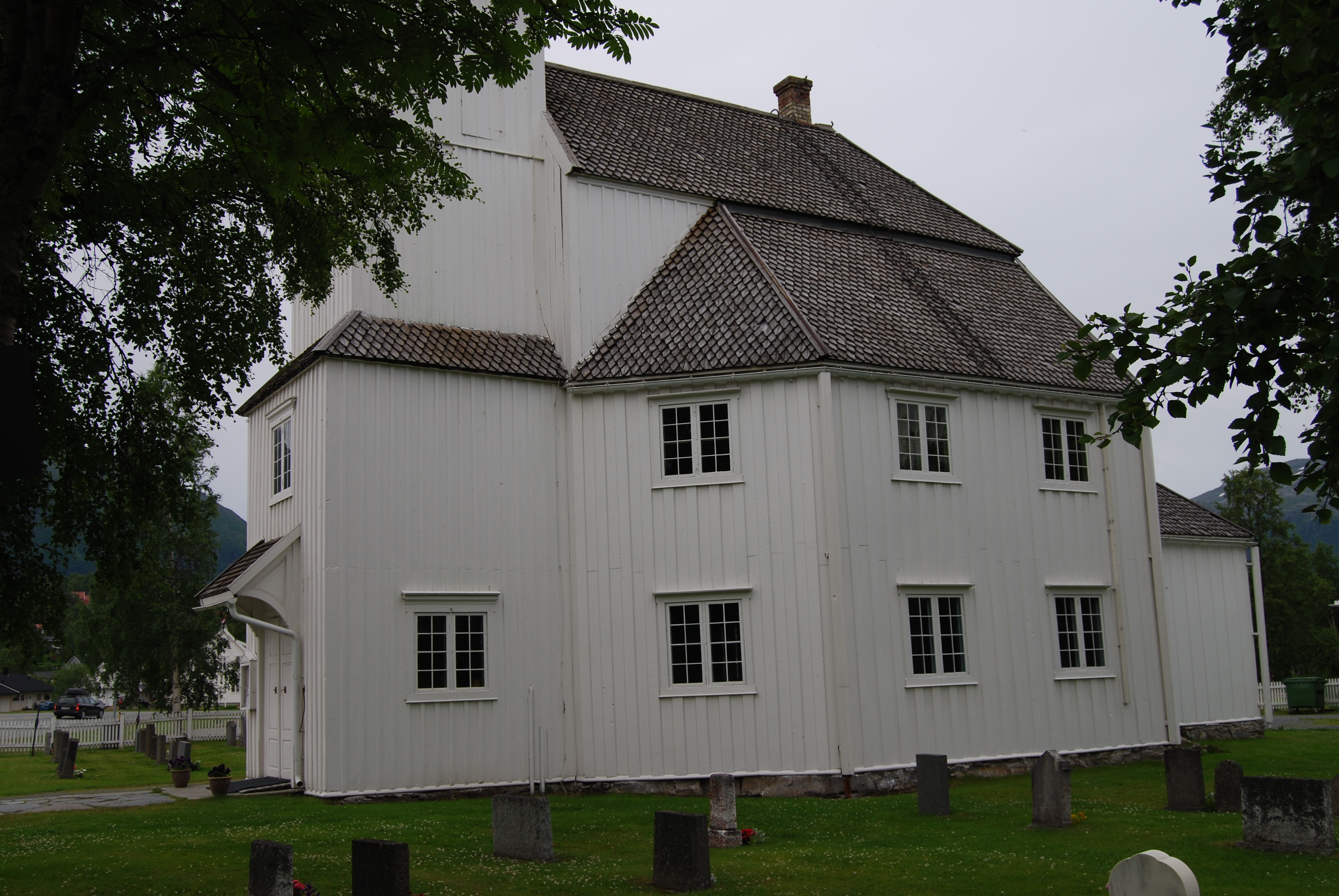

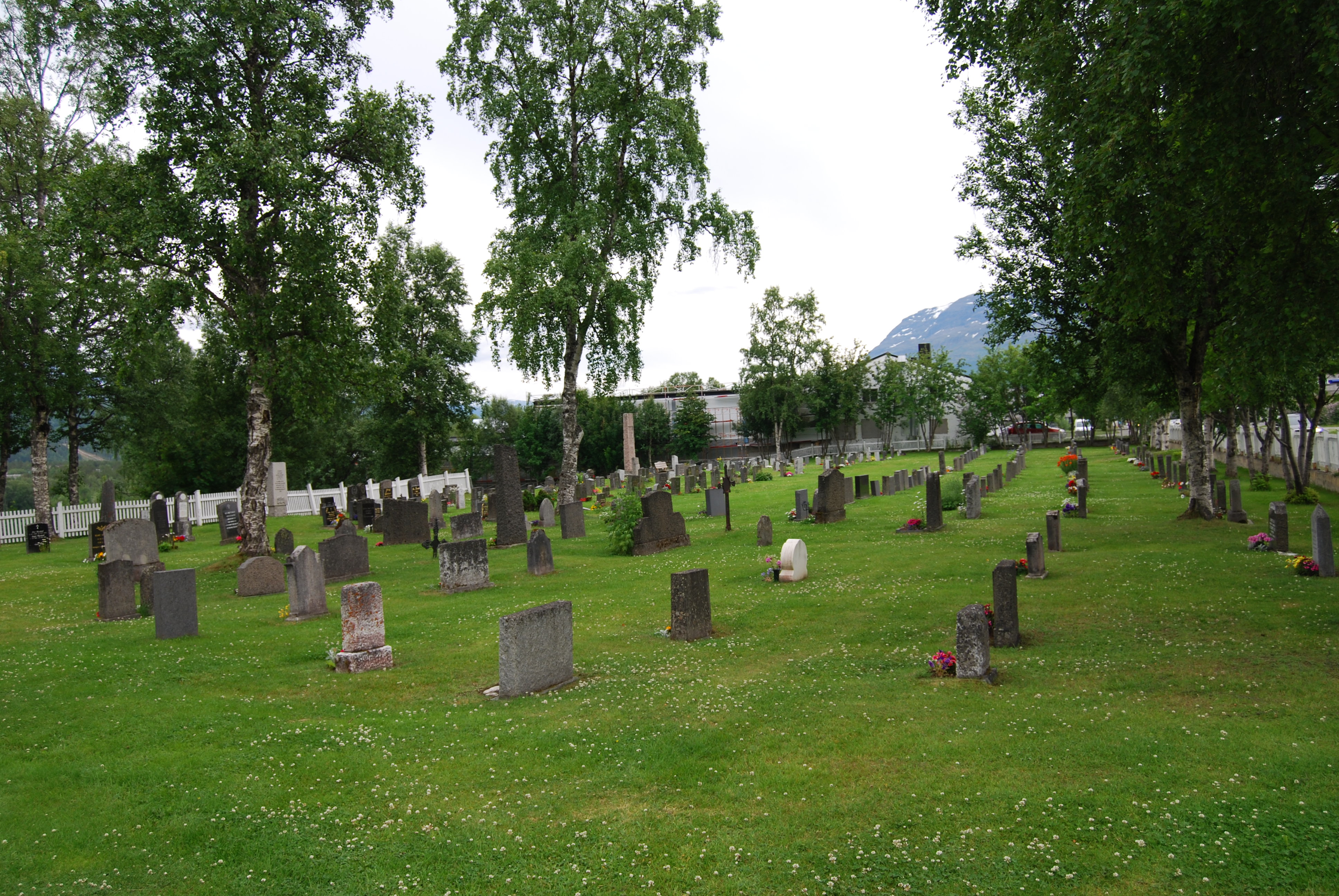

== See also ==
- List of churches in Nord-Hålogaland
- Octagonal churches in Norway
