= Liv Lundberg =

Norwegian poet and professor (1944–2022)

- Born: 23 October 1944; Bardu, Norway
- Died: 11 January 2022 (aged 77); Oslo
- Occupations: Writer; Educator
- Employer: University of Tromsø
- Children: Ingeborg Arvola
- Awards: Utdanningsprisen (2012)

Liv Lundberg (23 October 1944 – 11 January 2022) was a Norwegian poet, novelist, essayist and translator. She was also a professor at the University of Tromsø.

== Literary career ==
Lundberg made her literary debut in 1979 with the poetry collection Den klare tonen. Further collections are Hjertespeil (1981), Språkets hus har åpninger (1982) and Steindrømt (1985). In 1986 she published Sylvia Plath: Lady Lazarus, a translation of works by Sylvia Plath into Norwegian language. Her poetry collection Tveegget engel from 1988 was also influenced by Plath. In the 1990s she wrote two novels,Vinterens hjerte (1990) and Nybegynnerens forutsetningsløshet (1996). In 1997 she translated Inger Christensen's Alfabet into Norwegian language. She then returned to poetry, with the collection Afrika from 1998. In his treatment of Norwegian literature, Øystein Rottem characterized Lundberg as at the same time "ecstatic and erotic" and "analytic rational".

Lundberg further issued the poetry collections Iverksatt (1999) and Harlekins hud (2001). Her essays collection Tekstens etiske øyeblikk og andre essays was published in 2005, and the poetry collection Når jeg ikke hører hjemme in 2008. She also translated works by Nina Cassian, Ingrid Jonker and Shuntarō Tanikawa into Norwegian language.

Lundberg was also assigned professor at the University of Tromsø, and was awarded Utdanningsprisen in 2012 for her academic contributions.

== Personal life ==
Lundberg was born in Bardu Municipality on 23 October 1944. She was the mother of Ingeborg Arvola.

She was diagnosed with breast cancer in 2020, and died in Oslo on 11 January 2022.
