= Altevatnet =

Reservoir in Bardu, Norway

Altevatnet (Norwegian); Álddesjávri (Northern Sami)
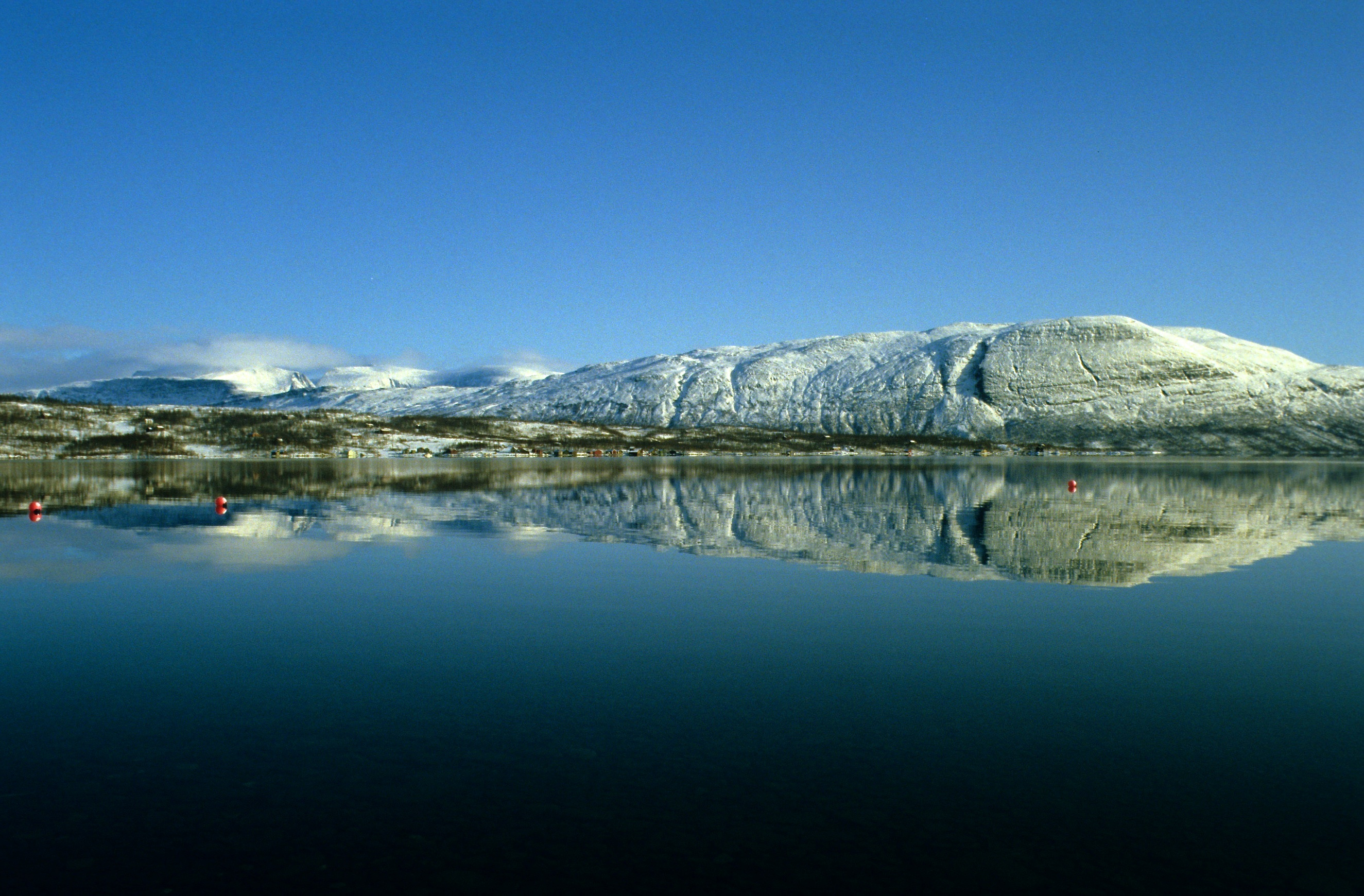
- View of the lake
- Interactive map of: Altevatnet (Norwegian); Álddesjávri (Northern Sami)
- Location: Troms
- Coordinates: 68.6424°N 19.0859°E
- Type: glacier lake
- Primary inflows: Fiskløyselva, Gamasjohka, Geadgejohka, Jordbruelva, Koievasselva, Krokelva, Leinavasselva, Luotnajohka and Suttesgaldojohka
- Primary outflows: Barduelva
- Catchment area: 1,249 km^{2} (482 sq mi)
- Basin countries: Norway
- Max. length: 45 km (28 mi)
- Max. width: 3 km (1.9 mi)
- Surface area: 79.65 km^{2} (30.75 sq mi)
- Average depth: 28 m (92 ft)
- Max. depth: 111 m (364 ft)
- Water volume: 2.23 km^{3} (0.54 cu mi)
- Surface elevation: 473–489 m (1,552–1,604 ft)
- References: NVE

Altevatnet (Norwegian) or Álddesjávri (Northern Sami) is Norway’s 11th largest lake. The 79.65-square-kilometre (30.75 sq mi) lake lies in Bardu Municipality in Troms county, Norway.

== Overview ==
=== Geography ===
Altevatnet is the largest lake in the county. It is approximately 38 kilometres (24 mi) long and about 2.5 kilometres (1.6 mi) wide. The lake is regulated by a dam on the northwestern end of the lake. The surface lies 489 metres (1,604 ft) above sea level and reaches a maximum depth of 99 metres (325 ft) below the surface of the lake.

=== Location ===
The lake lies about 10 kilometres (6.2 mi) from the Norwegian border with Sweden and it is located right between the two national parks: Øvre Dividal National Park and Rohkunborri National Park. The water discharges to the north into the Barduelva river, which empties into Målselva river, which in turn empties into the Malangen fjord.
