= Polar Park (animal park) =

- Interactive map of Polar Park
- 68.6917°N 18.1098°E
- Date opened: 18 June 1994
- Location: Bardu, Norway
- Land area: 110 ha (270 acres)
- No. of animals: 41 (as of July 2019)
- No. of species: 8
- Website: polarpark.no

Polar Park is an animal park in Bardu Municipality in Troms county, Norway. The park opened on 18 June 1994, displaying animals in their natural habitat. With only 12 enclosures on 110 hectares (270 acres), the park claims to have one of the world's biggest area-per-animal ratio. It also notes that it is the world's "most northern animal park."

The park specializes in Nordic fauna, including Norway's four largest predators: brown bear, Eurasian lynx, wolf, and wolverine. There are also moose, muskox, red deer, and reindeer. In October 2015, hunters accidentally wandered into the park's area and shot two red deer. As of July 2024, the number of each species resident in the park are listed on the park's website as follows:

| Species | Population |
|---|---|
| Brown bear | 9 |
| Eurasian Lynx | 4 |
| Elk | 3 |
| Muskox | 3 |
| Red deer | 4 |
| Reindeer | 13 |
| Wolf | 7 |
| Wolverine | 1 |

== Gallery ==
Photos from the park:

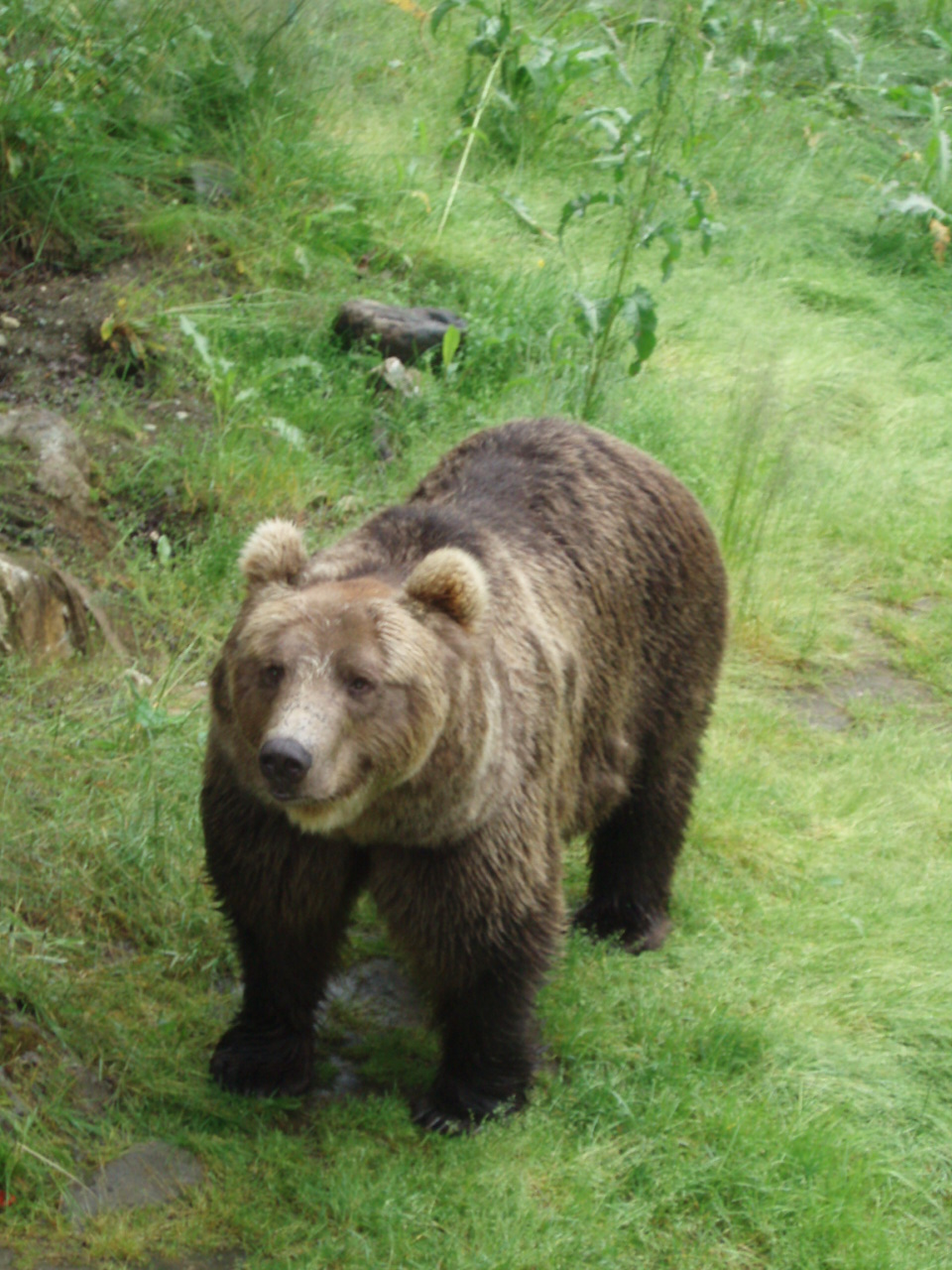
Brown bear

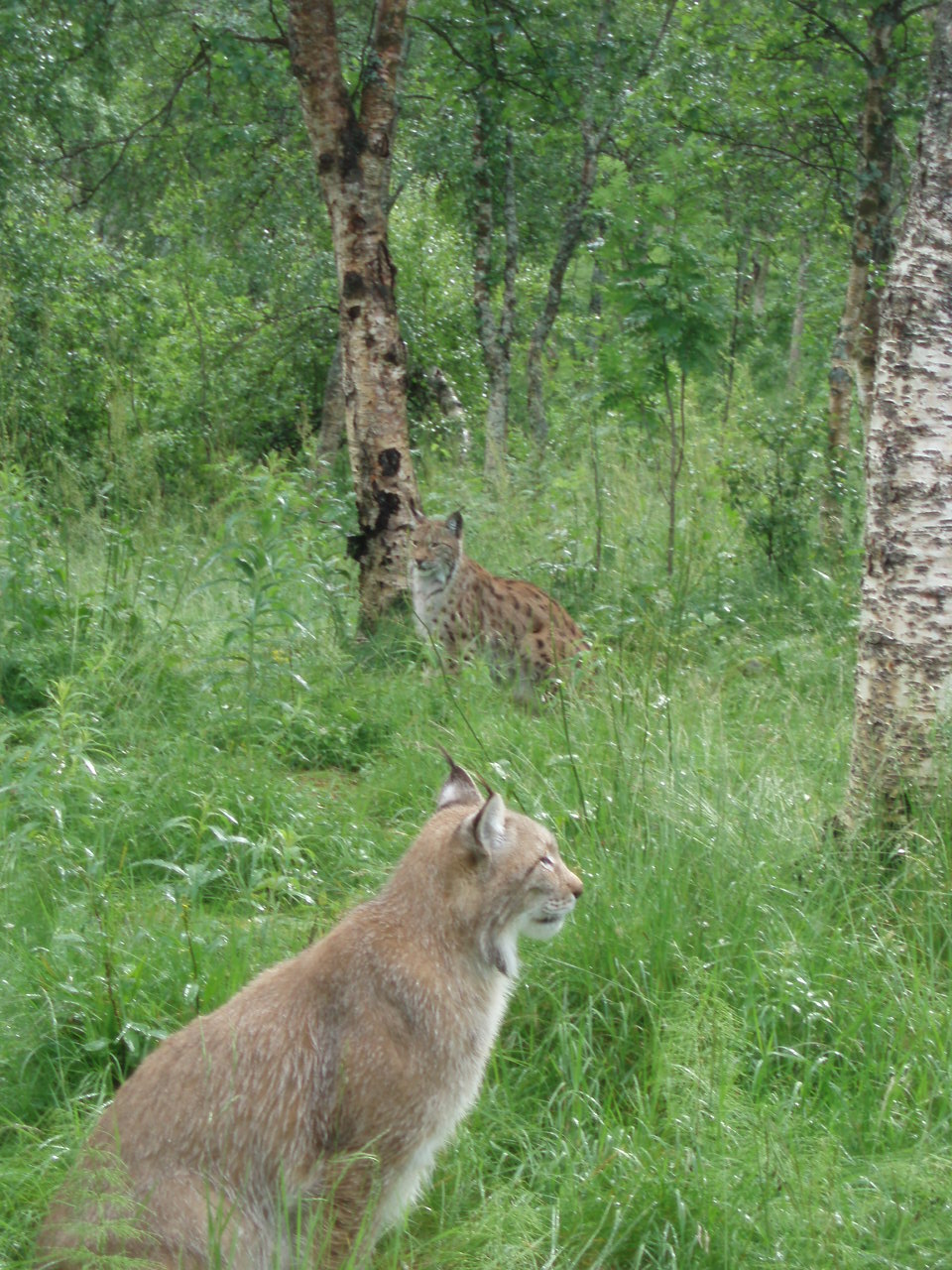
Lynx

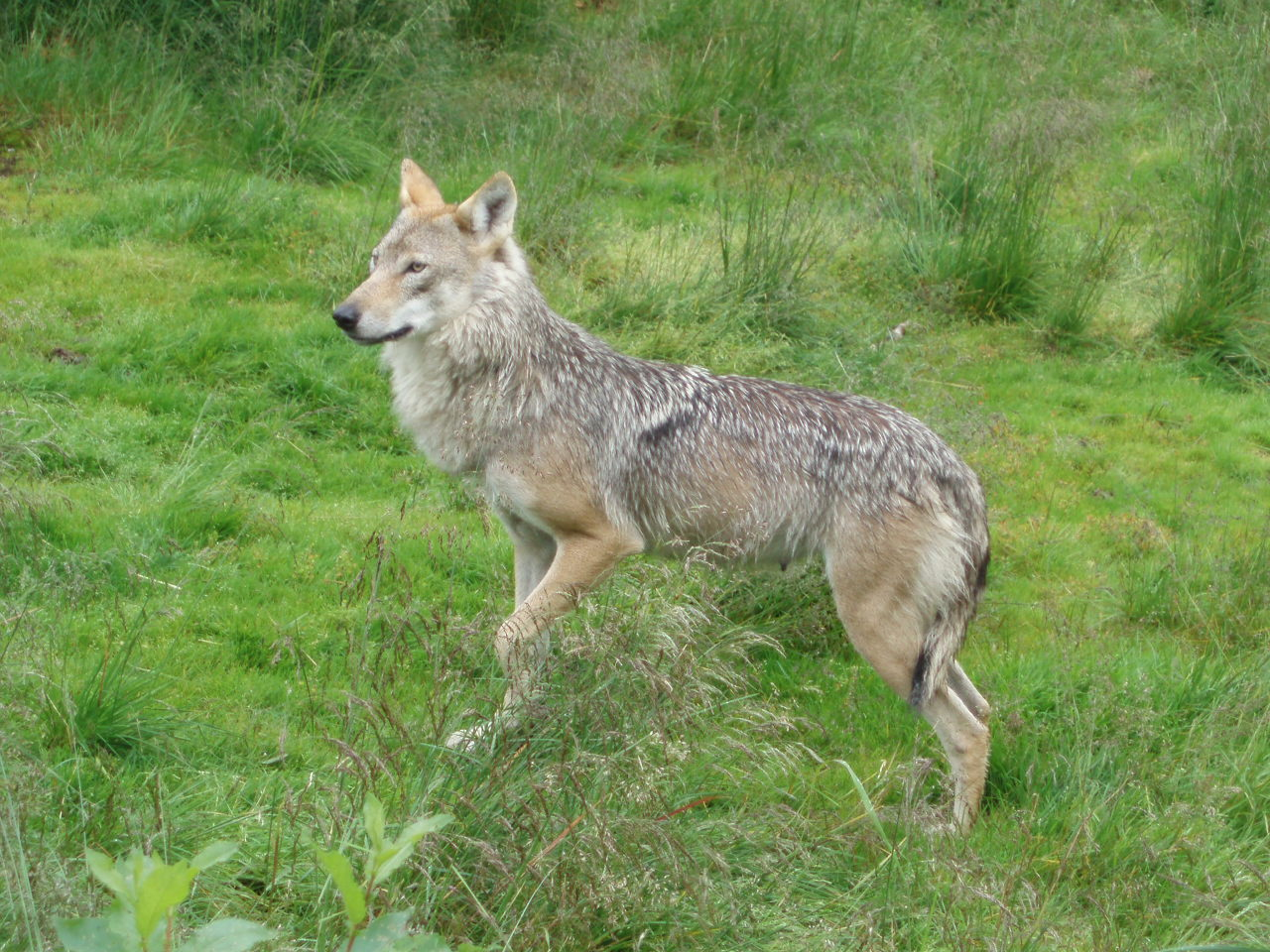
Wolf
