= Barduelva =

River in Troms, Norway

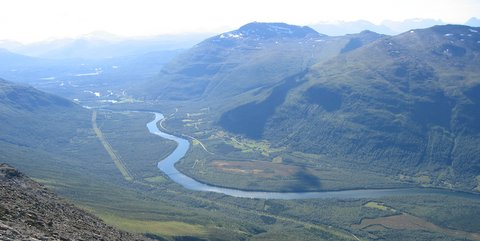
- Bardu river, looking to the north

Location
- Country: Norway
- County: Troms
- Municipalities: Bardu, Målselv

Physical characteristics
- Source: Altevatnet
  - location: Slåttmoberget, Bardu, Troms
  - coordinates: 68.6559°N 18.8838°E
  - elevation: 473 metres (1,552 ft)
- Mouth: Målselva
  - location: Fossmoen, Målselv, Troms
  - coordinates: 69.0452°N 18.6198°E
  - elevation: 0 metres (0 ft)
- Length: 70 km (43 mi)
- Basin size: 2,769 km^{2} (1,069 sq mi)

Basin features
- River system: Målselvvassdraget

Barduelva (Norwegian; lit. 'Bardu River') or Álddesjohka (Northern Sami) is a river in Troms county, Norway. The 70-kilometre (43 mi) long river is located in Bardu Municipality and Målselv Municipality. The river flows from the lake Altevatnet northwest to the town of Setermoen, then north to the municipal border with Målselv Municipality (with the river forming part of the border) before finally emptying into the river Målselva, just outside the village of Bardufoss and the Bardufoss Airport.

Barduelva is the largest source of hydroelectricity in all of Troms county. There are three power plants on the river: Innset, Straumsmo, and Bardufoss. Combined, they generate 1,235 gigawatt-hours (4,450 TJ) of power annually.

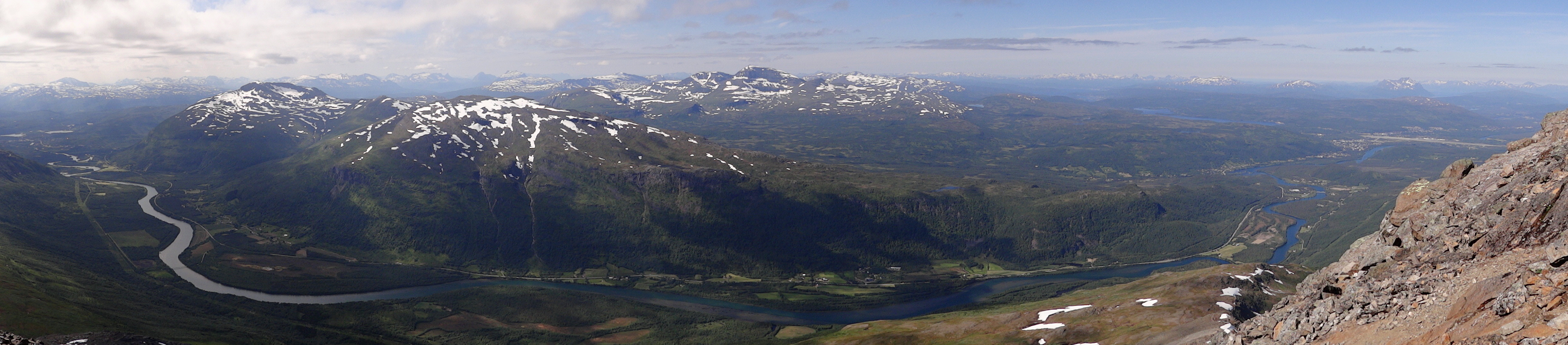
The stretch of the river between Setermoen and Andselv seen from near the top of Istinden.
