= Leinavatnet =

Lake between Kiruna Municipality, Sweden and Bardu, Norway

Leinavatnet (Norwegian); Davit Lenesjávri (Northern Sami)
- Interactive map of the lake
- Location: Bardu, Troms and Kiruna, Norbotten
- Coordinates: 68.4623°N 19.7676°E
- Basin countries: Norway and Sweden
- Max. length: 16 kilometres (9.9 mi)
- Max. width: 3.8 kilometres (2.4 mi)
- Surface area: 28.32 km^{2} (10.93 sq mi)
- Shore length^{1}: 62.83 kilometres (39.04 mi)
- Surface elevation: 491 metres (1,611 ft)
- References: NVE
- ^{1} Shore length is not a well-defined measure.

Leinavatnet (Norwegian) or Davit Lenesjávri (Northern Sami) is a lake on the border between Norway and Sweden. It is almost entirely located in Bardu Municipality in Troms county in Norway, but a very small area crosses over into Kiruna Municipality in Norrbotten County in Sweden. The lake's area is 28.32 square kilometres (10.93 sq mi) and it sits at an elevation of 491 metres (1,611 ft) above sea level. Its shoreline measures 62.83 kilometres (39.04 mi).
