= Setermoen =

Village in Bardu Municipality, Norway

- Village
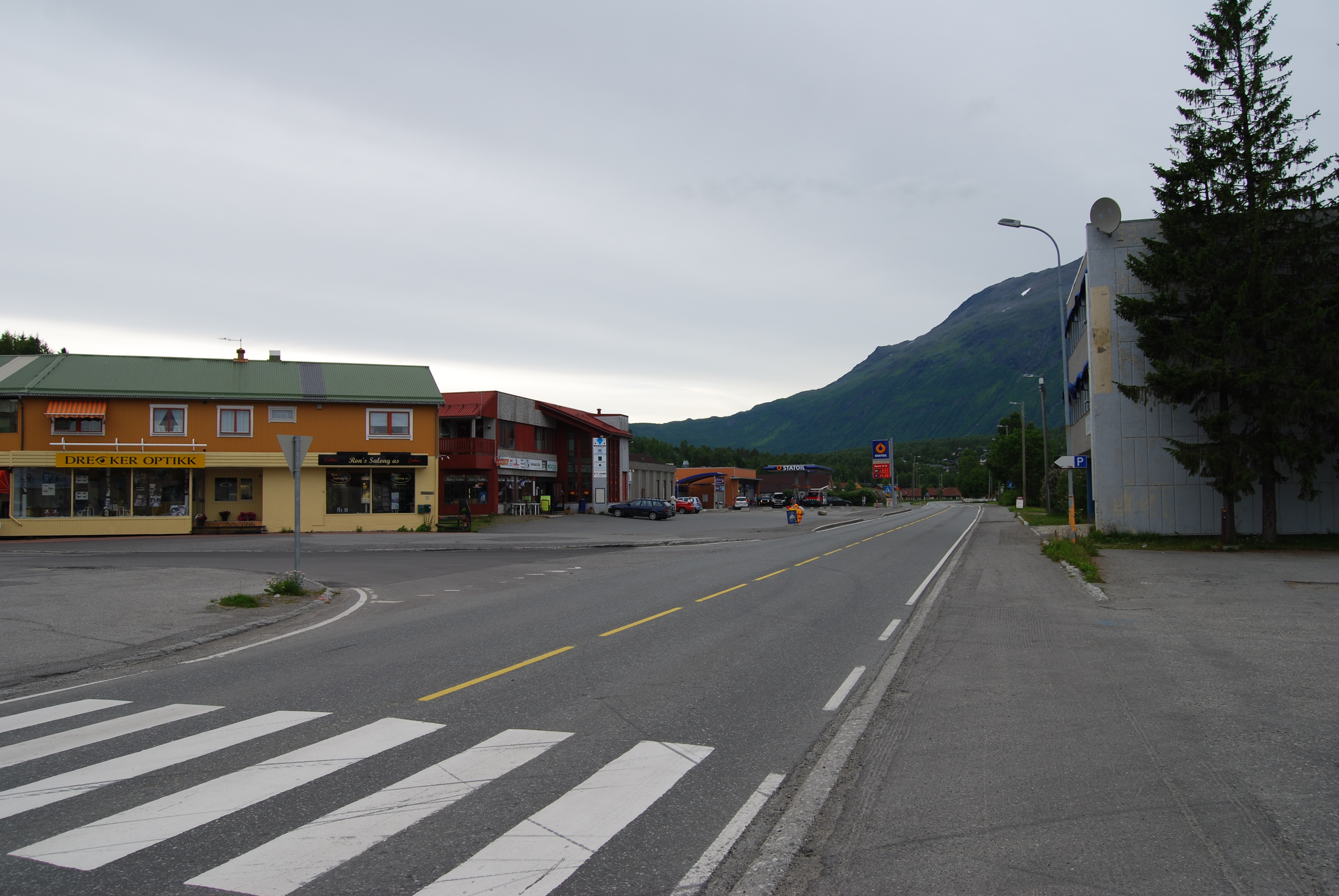
- View of the main road of the village
- Interactive map of Setermoen
- Location within Troms Location within Norway
- Coordinates: 68.8609°N 18.3483°E
- Country: Norway
- Region: Northern Norway
- County: Troms
- District: Hålogaland
- Municipality: Bardu

Area
  - Total: 2.87 km^{2} (1.11 sq mi)
- Elevation: 83 m (272 ft)

Population (2023)
  - Total: 2,505
  - Density: 873/km^{2} (2,260/sq mi)
- Time zone: UTC+01:00 (CET)
  - Summer (DST): UTC+02:00 (CEST)
- Post Code: 9360 Bardu

Setermoen is the administrative centre of Bardu Municipality in Troms county, Norway. The village is located along the Barduelva river, about 25 kilometres (16 mi) east of the village of Sjøvegan and about 25 kilometres (16 mi) south of Bardufoss.

In 1999, the municipal council of Bardu Municipality passed a resolution declaring town status for the village of Setermoen, but this was rejected by the government of Norway since the municipality has less than 5,000 inhabitants. The 2.87-square-kilometre (710-acre) village has a population (2023) of 2,505 and a population density of 873 inhabitants per square kilometre (2,260/sq mi).

== Location ==
Setermoen is located along the river Barduelva, and on the shores of Sætervatnet lake in the middle of the Bardudalen valley. It is about 23 km (14 mi) south of the town of Bardufoss and the Bardufoss Airport and about 75 km (47 mi) east of the town of Harstad. The European route E6 highway runs right through the center of Setermoen. Both the Bardu Church and the Setermoen military camp are located in Setermoen.

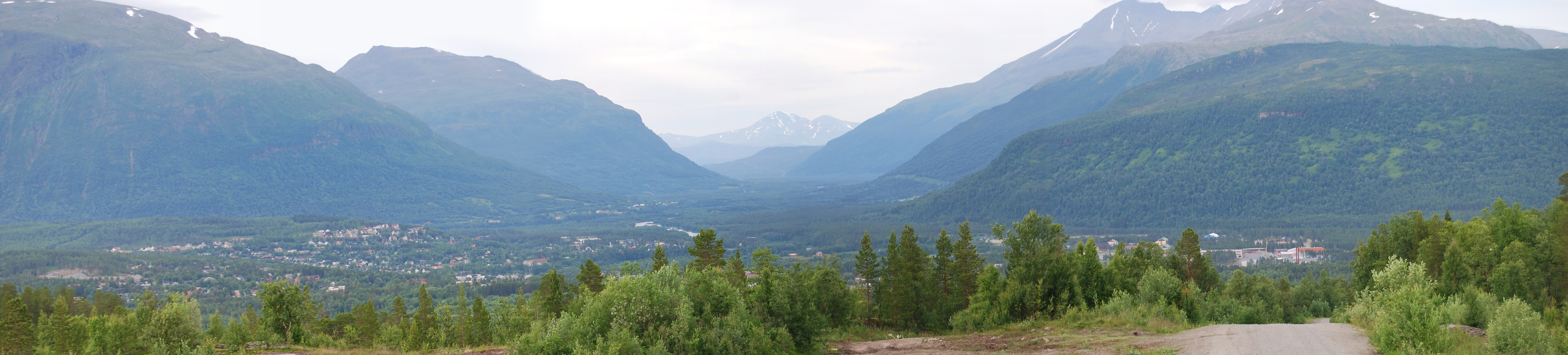
Setermoen is located among the inland valleys and mountains.

== Setermoen Camp ==
Military education was established at Setermoen in 1898 because of its strategic location in the midst of the mountains, and is one of the oldest army camps in Norway today. In many ways, the Norwegian Armed Forces has shaped Setermoen and the community through its presence.

Altogether, about 1,000 soldiers and 500 officers are stationed here, making it the largest garrison in Norway. Stationed at Setermoen are the following battalions, which are part of Brigade Nord:

- Artilleribataljonen (artillery battalion)
- Panserbataljonen (armoured battalion)
- Sanitetsbataljonen (medical battalion)
- Etteretningsbataljonen (intelligence battalion)

In 2007, the government began a massive renovation program at Setermoen. Most of the main buildings and barracks were torn down and new ones built. Costs of the project were nearly 1 billion kr (about US$155 million). The reason for the project was the end of the Cold War and the reorganization of the Norwegian Army from a mere mobilization force into a modern professional force, as this requires a lot more follow-up to the troops and better standards to attract more volunteers.
