= List of compositions by Richard D. James =

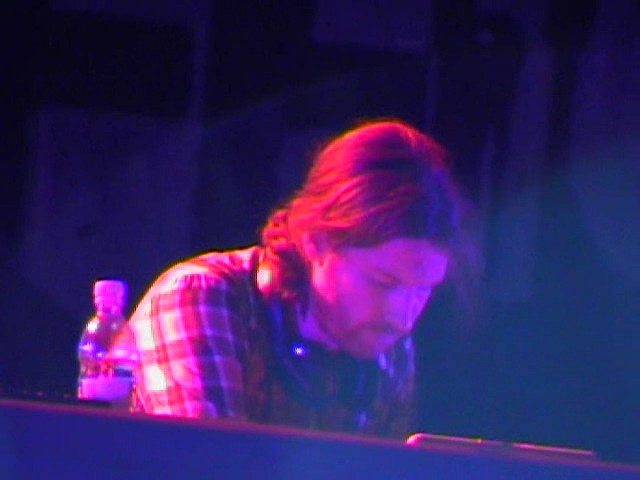
James performing in 2007

Richard D. James is an English musician who has recorded music since 1985. Over the course of his career, he has released tracks under many aliases, his most well-known being Aphex Twin. James has also released music under the pseudonyms, AFX, Blue Calx, Polygon Window, Analogue Bubblebath, Dice Man, GAK, Caustic Window, Power-Pill, Bradley Strider, The Tuss, Mike & Rich (with Mike Paradinas), and Universal Indicator (with Mike Dred).

All music written and produced by Richard D. James, except where noted.

Name of track, pseudonym, original release, length, and year of release
Track	Pseudonym	Original release	Length	Year	Ref.
".000890569"	AFX	Analogue Bubblebath Vol 3 (EP)	4:31	1993	
".0180871a"	AFX	Analogue Bubblebath Vol 3 (EP)	3:45	1993	
".0180871b"	AFX	Analogue Bubblebath Vol 3 (EP)	4:10	1993	
".1993841"	AFX	Analogue Bubblebath Vol 3 (EP)	5:43	1993	
".215061"	AFX	Analogue Bubblebath Vol 3 (EP)	4:16	1993	
".38"	AFX	Analogue Bubblebath Vol 3 (EP)	0:38	1993	
".55278037732581"	AFX	Analogue Bubblebath Vol 3 (EP)	4:18	1993	
".942937"	AFX	Analogue Bubblebath Vol 3 (EP)	4:31	1993	
"0035 1-Audio"	Aphex Twin	Computer Controlled Acoustic Instruments pt2 (EP)	0:26	2015	
"101 Rainbows Ambient Mix"	Caustic Window	Caustic Window	8:52	2014	
"15 c7"	Universal Indicator	Red	2:50	1992	
"180db_" [130] (Note: The album lists beats per minute for each song after each title)	Aphex Twin	Syro	3:11	2014	
"1st 44"	Aphex Twin	Collapse (EP)	6:10	2018	
"1st rushup m,+3" (Note: Credited to Karen Tregaskin)	The Tuss	Rushup Edge (2017 reissue)	2:17	2017	
"2 Analogue Talks"	AFX	Analord 6 (EP)	1:45	2005	
"28 organ 1.1 [ru,ec,+9]"	Aphex Twin	Come to Daddy (2017 reissue)	6:40	2017	
"24 TSIM 2"	Aphex Twin	Non-album single	6:08	2017	
"25 c14"	Universal Indicator	Green	6:38	1995	
"2X202-ST5"	Aphex Twin	Cheetah (EP)	8:13	2016	
"3 Gerald Remix"	Aphex Twin	Non-album single	5:24	2017	
"3 Notes Con"	AFX	Analord 11 (EP) (2009 reissue)	4:54	2009	
"4 bit 9d api+e+6" [126.26]	Aphex Twin	Syro	4:28	2014	
"4"	Aphex Twin	Richard D. James Album	3:37	1996	
"42DIMENSIT10"	AFX	London 03.06.17 (EP)	3:06	2017	
"42DIMENSIT3 e3"	AFX	London 03.06.17 (EP)	4:40	2017	
"46 Analord-Masplid"	AFX	Untitled (AFX / LFO) (EP)	4:41	2005	
"4x Atlantis take1"	AFX	orphans	3:49	2017	
"54 Cymru Beats"	Aphex Twin	Drukqs	5:59	2001	
"73-Yips"	Aphex Twin	On (EP)	4:14	1993	
"Abundance10edit[2 R8's, FZ20m & a 909]"	Aphex Twin	Collapse (EP)	6:20	2018	
"Acid Test 901"	Universal Indicator	Yellow	5:52	1993	
"Acrid Avid Jam Shred"	Aphex Twin	...I Care Because You Do	7:38	1995	
"Actium"	Aphex Twin	Selected Ambient Works 85–92	7:32	1992	
"Afx237 v.7"	Aphex Twin	Drukqs	4:15	2001	
"AFX 114" (Note: Track titles courtesy of Compilation (1998))	Caustic Window	Joyrex J4 EP (EP)	1:20	1992	
"AFX 2"	Aphex Twin	Analogue Bubblebath Vol I (EP)	5:26	1991	
"AFX 6/b"	AFX	Analogue Bubblebath Vol 3 (EP)	0:31	1993	
"AFX Acid 04"	AFX	Analord 7 (EP)	5:37	2005	
"afxfm e"	Aphex Twin	Barcelona 16.06.23 (EP)	2:53	2023	
"AFX Tribal Kik"	Caustic Window	Caustic Window	1:06	2014	
"Ageispolis"	Aphex Twin	Selected Ambient Works 85–92	5:23	1992	
"Airflow"	Caustic Window	Caustic Window	5:06	2014	
"aisatsana" [102]	Aphex Twin	Syro	5:21	2014	
"Akunk" (Note: Credited to Brian Tregaskin)	The Tuss	Confederation Trough (EP) (LP release)	4:42	2007	
"Alberto Balsalm"	Aphex Twin	...I Care Because You Do	5:11	1995	
"Alien Fanny Farts"	Aphex Twin	Analog Bubblebath Vol 2 (EP)	3:59	1991	
"Alspacka"	The Tuss	Confederation Trough (EP)	4:56	2007	
"Analogue Bubblebath" (Note: Later released on Classics as "Analogue Bubblebath 1")	Aphex Twin	Analogue Bubblebath Vol I (EP)	4:41	1991	
"Analoggins" (Note: Written by Captain Voafose and Smojphace)	AFX	Analord 6 (EP)	7:17	2005	
"Analord 158b"	AFX	Analord 1 (EP)	1:40	2005	
"Arched Maid via RDJ"	AFX	Hangable Auto Bulb EP.2 (EP)	5:23	1995	
"Astroblaster"	Caustic Window	Joyrex J5 EP (EP)	5:27	1992	
"At the Heart of It All"	Aphex Twin	26 Mixes for Cash	3:49	2003	
"Audax Powder"	Polygon Window	Surfing on Sine Waves	4:36	1993	
"Aussois"	Aphex Twin	Drukqs	0:07	2001	
"Avril 14th"	Aphex Twin	Drukqs	2:05	2001	
"avril 14th half speed alternative version [re-recorded 2009 Nagra]"	Aphex Twin	Drukqs (2017 reissue)	5:07	2017	
"avril 14th reversed music not audio [re-recorded 2009 Nagra]"	Aphex Twin	Drukqs (2017 reissue)	2:12	2017	
"Backdoor.Berbew.Q"	AFX	Analord 8 (EP)	4:57	2005	
"Backdoor.Netshadow"	AFX	Analord 9 (EP)	4:49	2005	
"Backdoor.Ranky.S"	AFX	Analord 11 (EP)	6:00	2005	
"Backdoor.Spybooter.A"	AFX	Analord 8 (EP)	5:06	2005	
"bank lullaby"	Aphex Twin	Come to Daddy (2017 reissue)	1:49	2017	
"Batine Acid"	AFX	Analord 6 (EP)	5:26	2005	
"Bbydhyonchord"	Aphex Twin	Drukqs	2:21	2001	
"The Beauty of Being Numb (Section B)"	Aphex Twin	26 Mixes for Cash	3:27	2003	
"Beetles"	Aphex Twin	Girl/Boy (EP)	1:31	1996	
"Beskhu3epnm"	Aphex Twin	Drukqs	1:58	2001	
"Bike Pump Meets Bucket"	Polygon Window	Quoth (EP)	5:58	1993	
"Bit"	AFX	Hangable Auto Bulb EP (EP)	0:06	1995	
"Bit 4"	Aphex Twin	Drukqs	0:18	2001	
"Blackbox Life Recorder 21f"	Aphex Twin	Blackbox Life Recorder 21f / in a room7 F760 (EP)	4:26	2023	
"Blue Calx"	Blue Calx	The Philosophy Of Sound And Machine	7:15	1992	
"Blur" (Note: All tracks, except "Blue Calx", on Selected Ambient Works Volume II are officially untitled, instead representing them with picture's in the album's artwork. Unofficial titled based on the pictures were given to them by fan Greg Eden and are listed here. The titles are supported by AllMusic.)	Aphex Twin	Selected Ambient Works Volume II	5:08	1994	
"Bodmin 1"	AFX	Analord 6 (EP) (2009 reissue)	4:36	2009	
"Bodmin 2"	AFX	Analord 6 (EP) (2009 reissue)	4:17	2009	
"Bodmin 3"	AFX	Analord 6 (EP) (2009 reissue)	5:26	2009	
"Body Pads"	Aphex Twin	London 19.08.2023 (EP)	2:45	2023	
"bonus EMT beats"	AFX	Orphaned Deejay Selek 2006–08 (EP)	4:46	2015	
"Boxing Day"	AFX	Analord 3 (EP)	6:36	2005	
"Bradley's Beat Part One"	Bradley Strider	Bradley's Beat (EP)	6:10	1995	
"Bradley's Beat Part Two" [Side X track]	Bradley Strider	Bradley's Beat (EP)	3:32	1995	
"Bradley's Beat Part Two" [Side Z track]	Bradley Strider	Bradley's Beat (EP)	5:52	1995	
"Breath March"	AFX	Analord 4 (EP)	3:46	2005	
"Brivert & Muonds" (Note: Written and composed by Mike Paradinas and Richard D. James)	Mike & Rich	Expert Knob Twiddlers (2016 reissue)	6:17	2016	
"Btoum-Roumada"	Aphex Twin	Drukqs	1:56	2001	
"Bu Bu Bu Ba"	Mike & Rich	Expert Knob Twiddlers	6:51	1996	
"Bubble 'n' Squeek 2"	AFX	Analord 1 (EP)	1:31	2005	
"Bucephalus Bouncing Ball"	Aphex Twin	Come to Daddy (EP)	5:46	1997	
"Bummy"	AFX	Mealtime	3:12	1997	
"Bwoon Dub"	AFX	Analord 2 (EP)	5:56	2005	
"Canticle Drawl"	AFX	Analord 1 (EP)	1:45	2005	
"Carn Marth"	Aphex Twin	Richard D. James Album	2:33	1996	
"Carnival Acid"	AFX	Analord 2 (EP) (2009 reissue)	3:32	2009	
"CHEETA1b ms800"	Aphex Twin	Cheetah (EP)	0:27	2016	
"CHEETA2 ms800"	Aphex Twin	Cheetah (EP)	0:37	2016	
"CHEETAHT2 [Ld spectrum]"	Aphex Twin	Cheetah (EP)	5:53	2016	
"CHEETAHT7b"	Aphex Twin	Cheetah (EP)	6:43	2016	
"Children Talking"	AFX	Hangable Auto Bulb EP (EP)	5:19	1995	
"choirDrilll"	AFX	Hangable Auto Bulb - Extras (EP)	4:12	2017	
"Cilonen"	AFX	Analord 5 (EP)	5:34	2005	
"CIRCLONT14" [152.97] (syrobonkus mix)	Aphex Twin	Syro	7:21	2014	
"CIRCLONT6A" [141.98] (syrobonkus mix)	Aphex Twin	Syro	6:00	2014	
"CIRKLON3 [Колхозная mix]"	Aphex Twin	Cheetah (EP)	8:13	2016	
"CIRKLON 1"	Aphex Twin	Cheetah (EP)	7:17	2016	
"Clayhill Dub"	Caustic Window	Joyrex J9ii (EP)	3:23	1993	
"Cliffs"	Aphex Twin	Selected Ambient Works Volume II	7:27	1994	
"clissold 101[dat28 otari] 48k"	Polygon Window	Surfing on Sine Waves (2017 reissue)	5:43	2017	
"Clissold Bathroom"	Mike & Rich	Expert Knob Twiddlers (2016 reissue)	0:54	2016	
"Cock/Ver10"	Aphex Twin	Drukqs	5:17	2001	
"Cock/Ver10 (Delco Freedom Mix)"	Aphex Twin	Drukqs Two Track Promo	5:08	2001	
"Come On You Slags!"	Aphex Twin	...I Care Because You Do	5:45	1995	
"Come to Daddy" (Note: Three different mixes appear on the Come to Daddy EP. Single release is the Pappy Mix.)	Aphex Twin	Come to Daddy (EP)	4:42 (Note: Length of the Pappy Mix. Length of Little Lord Faulteroy Mix and Mummy Mix is 3:50 and 3:54, respectively.)	1997	
"computerband 2000 m,+3"	The Tuss	Rushup Edge (2017 reissue)	2:22	2017	
"consciousness utopia"	Aphex Twin	...I Care Because You Do (2017 reissue)	7:18	2017	
"consta-lume"	Aphex Twin	...I Care Because You Do (2017 reissue)	7:04	2017	
"Cordialatron"	Caustic Window	Joyrex J4 EP (EP)	4:43	1992	
"Cornish Acid"	Aphex Twin	Richard D. James Album	2:14	1996	
"Cow Cud Is a Twin"	Aphex Twin	...I Care Because You Do	5:34	1995	
"Crying in Your Face"	AFX	Analord 4 (EP)	4:23	2005	
"Cunt"	Caustic Window	Caustic Window	4:16	2014	
"Curtains"	Aphex Twin	Selected Ambient Works Volume II	8:51	1994	
"Custodian Discount"	AFX	Hangable Auto Bulb EP (EP)	4:25	1995	
"D-Scape"	Aphex Twin	On (EP)	6:54	1993	
"Death Fuck" (Note: Labeled "H949" on 2017 reissue)	The Tuss	Rushup Edge	6:38	2007	
"Delphium"	Aphex Twin	Selected Ambient Works 85–92	5:26	1992	
"Dgitne Tst1e"	Aphex Twin	London 19.08.2023 (EP)	2:50	2023	
"Digeridoo" (Note: Later released on the compilation album Classics (1994))	Aphex Twin	Digeridoo (EP)	7:11	1992	
"disk aud1_12"	Aphex Twin	Computer Controlled Acoustic Instruments pt2 (EP)	0:10	2015	
"disk prep calrec2 barn dance [slo]"	Aphex Twin	Computer Controlled Acoustic Instruments pt2 (EP)	4:22	2015	
"diskhat1"	Aphex Twin	Computer Controlled Acoustic Instruments pt2 (EP)	2:26	2015	
"diskhat2"	Aphex Twin	Computer Controlled Acoustic Instruments pt2 (EP)	0:38	2015	
"diskhat ALL prepared1mixed 13"	Aphex Twin	Computer Controlled Acoustic Instruments pt2 (EP)	5:22	2015	
"DISKPREPT1"	Aphex Twin	Computer Controlled Acoustic Instruments pt2 (EP)	3:30	2015	
"DISKPREPT4"	Aphex Twin	Computer Controlled Acoustic Instruments pt2 (EP)	1:53	2015	
"dmx acid test"	AFX	Orphaned Deejay Selek 2006–08 (EP)	1:17	2015	
"Dodeccaheedron"	Aphex Twin	Xylem Tube EP	5:48	1992	
"Domino"	Aphex Twin	Selected Ambient Works Volume II	7:18	1994	
"Donkey Rhubarb"	Aphex Twin	Donkey Rhubarb (EP)	6:08	1995	
"dRuQks Prepared uN 1"	Aphex Twin	Drukqs (2017 reissue)	3:01	2017	
"efil pearls ,e,+4"	Aphex Twin	...I Care Because You Do (2017 reissue)	5:57	2017	
"Eggy Toast"	Mike & Rich	Expert Knob Twiddlers	4:07	1996	
"em2500 M253X"	AFX	London 03.06.17 (EP)	1:50	2017	
"end E2"	Aphex Twin	Syro (2017 reissue)	5:19	2017	
"En Trance to Exit" (Note: Co-produced by Schizophrenia)	Aphex Twin	Analogue Bubblebath Vol I (EP)	4:22	1991	
"Every Day"	AFX	Hangable Auto Bulb EP.2 (EP)	3:44	1995	
"Fantasia"	Caustic Window	Joyrex J9i (EP)	6:01	1993	
"Father"	Aphex Twin	Drukqs	0:51	2001	
"Fenix Funk 5"	Aphex Twin	Analord 10 (EP)	8:52	2005	
"Flim"	Aphex Twin	Come to Daddy (EP)	2:57	1997	
"Fingerbib"	Aphex Twin	Richard D. James Album	3:48	1996	
"Fingertrips"	Caustic Window	Caustic Window	4:17	2014	
"Fingry"	Caustic Window	Caustic Window	4:51	2014	
"Flap Head"	Aphex Twin	Digeridoo (EP)	6:41	1992	
"Flutey"	Caustic Window	Caustic Window	8:20	2014	
"Flutternozzle"	AFX	Analord 4 (EP) (2009 reissue)	6:28	2009	
"forgotten life path"	Aphex Twin	Come to Daddy (2017 reissue)	2:28	2017	
"[Formula]" (Note: Official title is "$\Delta M_i^{-1} = - \alpha \sum_{n=1}^N D_i \left[ n \right] \left[ \sum_{j \in C \left[ i \right]}^{} F_{ji} \left[ n -1 \right] + Fext_i \left[ n^{-1} \right] \right]$". Known as "[Formula]" according to Warp.)	Aphex Twin	Non-album single B-side to "Windowlicker"	5:43	1999	
"Fredugolon 6"	The Tuss	Confederation Trough (EP)	5:34	2007	
"Freeman Hardy & Willis Acid"	AFX (with Squarepusher)	We Are Reasonable People	5:42	1998	
"Funny Little Man"	Aphex Twin	Come to Daddy (EP)	4:22	1997	
"fz pseudotimestretch+e+3" [138.85]	Aphex Twin	Syro	0:58	2014	
"GAK 1"	GAK	GAK (EP)	6:35	1994	
"GAK 2"	GAK	GAK (EP)	6:14	1994	
"GAK 3"	GAK	GAK (EP)	5:22	1994	
"GAK 4"	GAK	GAK (EP)	6:03	1994	
"gak5 e, +3"	GAK	GAK (EP) (2017 reissue)	1:37	2017	
"gak6 e, +3"	GAK	GAK (EP) (2017 reissue)	5:25	2017	
"gak7 e, +3"	GAK	GAK (EP) (2017 reissue)	6:00	2017	
"gak bass,e, +2"	GAK	GAK (EP) (2017 reissue)	3:29	2017	
"gak police er,2"	GAK	GAK (EP) (2017 reissue)	4:28	2017	
"The Garden of Linmiri"	Caustic Window	Joyrex J9ii (EP)	6:08	1993	
"get a baby"	AFX	Hangable Auto Bulb - Extras (EP)	2:27	2017	
"Giant Deflating Football"	Mike & Rich	Expert Knob Twiddlers	6:22	1996	
"Girl/Boy" (Note: Three different mixes appear on the Girl/Boy EP. The NLS Mix (titled "Girl/Boy Song" appears on Richard D. James Album)	Aphex Twin	Girl/Boy (EP)	4:52 (Note: Length of NLS Mix. Lengths of £18 Snarerush Mix and Redruth Mix are 1:57 and 1:40, respectively.)	1996	
"Gong Acid"	AFX	Analord 5 (EP) (2009 reissue)	3:05	2009	
"Goon Gumpas"	Aphex Twin	Richard D. James Album	2:02	1996	
"goodbye jo [original live mixdown]"	The Tuss	Rushup Edge (2017 reissue)	4:05	2017	
"Goodbye Rute"	The Tuss	Rushup Edge	5:21	2007	
"Grass"	Aphex Twin	Selected Ambient Works Volume II	8:55	1994	
"Green Calx"	Aphex Twin	Selected Ambient Works 85–92	6:05	1992	
"Grey Stripe"	Aphex Twin	Selected Ambient Works Volume II	4:45	1994	
"Growth Inst. [Blonder]+6,Ru"	Aphex Twin	Girl/Boy (EP) (2017 reissue)	2:37	2017	
"Grumpy Acid"	AFX	Analord 1 (EP)	3:21	2005	
"Gwarek2"	Aphex Twin	Drukqs	6:38	2001	
"Gwely Mernans"	Aphex Twin	Drukqs	5:00	2001	
"GX1 Solo"	The Tuss	Confederation Trough (EP) (CD release)	5:01	2007	
"Halibut Acid"	AFX	Analord 4 (EP)	6:07	2005	
"Hangable Auto Bulb"	AFX	Hangable Auto Bulb EP (EP)	6:48	1995	
"Hankie"	Aphex Twin	Selected Ambient Works Volume II	4:39	1994	
"HAT 2B 2012B"	Aphex Twin	Computer Controlled Acoustic Instruments pt2 (EP)	1:25	2015	
"HAT5C 0001 rec-4"	Aphex Twin	Computer Controlled Acoustic Instruments pt2 (EP)	4:46	2015	
"Hedphelym"	Aphex Twin	Selected Ambient Works 85–92	6:00	1992	
"Heliosphan"	Aphex Twin	Selected Ambient Works 85–92	4:51	1992	
"Hexagon"	Aphex Twin	Selected Ambient Works Volume II	5:58	1994	
"Home Made Polysynth"	AFX	Analord 4 (EP)	4:07	2005	
"Humanoid Must Not Escape"	Caustic Window	Joyrex J9i (EP)	5:41	1993	
"Hy a Scullyas Lyf Adhagrow"	Aphex Twin	Drukqs	2:10	2001	
"I'm Self Employed"	AFX	Analord 6 (EP)	4:26	2005	
"i"	Aphex Twin	Selected Ambient Works 85–92	1:17	1992	
"Icct Hedral (edit)"	Aphex Twin	...I Care Because You Do	6:07	1995	
"If It Really Is Me"	Polygon Window	Surfing on Sine Waves	7:01	1993	
"Iketa"	Polygon Window	Quoth (EP)	4:30	1993	
"In A Room7 F760"	Aphex Twin	Blackbox Life Recorder 21f / in a room7 F760 (EP)	3:53	2023	
"In the Maze Park"	AFX	Analord 4 (EP) (2009 reissue)	1:31	2009	
"Inkey$"	Aphex Twin	Girl/Boy (EP)	1:24	1996	
"Isopropophlex"	Aphex Twin	Analogue Bubblebath Vol I (EP)	5:20	1991	
"Italic Eyeball"	Caustic Window	Joyrex J4 EP (EP)	4:24	1992	
"IZ-US"	Aphex Twin	Come to Daddy (EP)	2:57	1997	
"Jazzphase"	Caustic Window	Caustic Window	4:23	2014	
"Jelly Fish"	Mike & Rich	Expert Knob Twiddlers	6:30	1996	
"Jelly Fish (Mix 2)"	Mike & Rich	Expert Knob Twiddlers (2016 reissue)	5:21	2016	
"Joyrex J4"	Caustic Window	Joyrex J4 EP (EP)	4:27	1992	
"Joyrex J5"	Caustic Window	Joyrex J5 EP (EP)	6:54	1992	
"Jynweythek"	Aphex Twin	Drukqs	2:14	2001	
"Kesson Dalek"	Aphex Twin	Drukqs	1:18	2001	
"Kladfvgbung Micshk"	Aphex Twin	Drukqs	2:00	2001	
"Klopjob"	AFX	Analord 3 (EP)	5:24	2005	
"korg 1b"	AFX	Korg Trax+Tunings for falling asleep	3:00	2017	
"korg funk 5"	AFX	Korg Trax+Tunings for falling asleep	3:27	2017	
"ktpa1"	AFX	Smojphace (EP)	7:29	2003	
"ktpa2"	AFX	Smojphace (EP)	3:38	2003	
"Laricheard"	AFX	Analord 2 (EP)	2:15	2005	
"Last Rushup 10"	The Tuss	Rushup Edge	6:35	2007	
"Laughable Butane Bob"	AFX	Hangable Auto Bulb EP (EP)	2:58	1995	
"Leaving Home"	Bradley Strider	Bradley's Robot (EP)	7:40	1993	
"Lichen"	Aphex Twin	Selected Ambient Works Volume II	4:15	1994	
"Linmiri"	Bradley Strider	Bradley's Robot (EP)	5:53	1993	
"Liptons B Acid"	AFX	Analord 9 (EP) (2009 reissue)	5:47	2009	
"Lisbon Acid"	AFX	Analord 7 (EP)	8:29	2005	
"Logan Rock Witch"	Aphex Twin	Richard D. James Album	3:33	1996	
"Lornaderek"	Aphex Twin	Drukqs	0:30	2001	
"Love 7"	AFX	Analord 11 (EP) (2009 reissue)	4:45	2009	
"M12 6 Omc Zeq"	Aphex Twin	Blackbox Life Recorder 21f / in a room7 F760 (EP)	6:00	2023	
"Mangle 11"	Aphex Twin	Drukqs (2017 reissue)	5:55	2017	
"MARCHROMT30A edit 2b 96" [104.98]	Aphex Twin	Syro (Japanese edition)	7:19	2014	
"MARCHROMT38 fast"	Aphex Twin	Non-album single B-side to "MARCHROMT30A edit 2b 96"	5:36	2015	
"Matchsticks"	Aphex Twin	Selected Ambient Works Volume II	5:41	1994	
"MC-4 Acid"	AFX	Analord 1 (EP)	3:47	2005	
"Meltphace 6"	Aphex Twin	Drukqs	6:14	2001	
"merry maidens e,ru,ec +4"	Aphex Twin	...I Care Because You Do (2017 reissue)	2:18	2017	
"Metapharstic"	Aphex Twin	Mayday - A New Chapter Of House And Techno '92	4:36	1992	
"Midievil Rave"	AFX	Analord 3 (EP)	2:44	2005	
"midi pipe2c edit,+3"	AFX	Orphaned Deejay Selek 2006–08 (EP) (2017 reissue)	4:09	2017	
"midi pipe1c sds3time cube/klonedrm"	AFX	Orphaned Deejay Selek 2006–08 (EP)	2:27	2015	
"Midievil Rave 2"	AFX	Analord 3 (EP)	4:00	2005	
"Milkman Bonus Beets"	Aphex Twin	Girl/Boy (EP) (2017 reissue)	1:33	2017	
"Milkman Instrumentil"	Aphex Twin	Girl/Boy (EP) (2017 reissue)	1:35	2017	
"minipops 67" [120.2] (source field mix)	Aphex Twin	Syro	4:47	2014	
"Mookid"	Aphex Twin	...I Care Because You Do	3:51	1995	
"Mould"	Aphex Twin	Selected Ambient Works Volume II	3:31	1994	
"Mr. Frosty"	Mike & Rich	Expert Knob Twiddlers	6:51	1996	
"MT1 T29R2"	Aphex Twin	Collapse (EP)	6:04	2018	
"MT1T1 bedroom microtune"	AFX	London 03.06.17 (EP)	3:47	2017	
"MT1T2 olpedroom"	AFX	London 03.06.17 (EP)	1:57	2017	
"Mt Saint Michel + Saint Michaels Mount"	Aphex Twin	Drukqs	8:02	2001	
"Mumbly"	Caustic Window	Caustic Window	5:31	2014	
"Naks 11 [Mono]"	AFX	Untitled (AFX / LFO) (EP)	2:56	2005	
"My Teapot"	Polygon Window	Artificial Intelligence II	3:58	1994	
"Naks Acid" (Note: ”Naks Acid” is an extended version of “Naks 11 [Mono]” that appeared on the untitled (AFX / LFO) EP the same year.)	Aphex Twin	Wipeout Pure: The Official Soundtrack	3:36	2005	
"Nannou"	Aphex Twin	Non-album single B-side to "Windowlicker"	4:13	1999	
"Nanou2"	Aphex Twin	Drukqs	3:22	2001	
"NEOTEKT72"	AFX	Orphaned Deejay Selek 2006–08 (EP)	6:10	2015	
"Next Heap With"	Aphex Twin	...I Care Because You Do	4:43	1995	
"NgaiModu"	Bradley Strider	Bradley's Robot (EP)	5:54	1993	
"Nightmail 1"	AFX	orphans	5:02	2017	
"no cares [48k]"	Aphex Twin	...I Care Because You Do (2017 reissue)	2:49	2017	
"no stillson 6 cirk"	Aphex Twin	Houston, TX 12.17.16 (EP)	10:43	2016	
"no stillson 6 cirk mix2"	Aphex Twin	Houston, TX 12.17.16 (EP)	10:13	2016	
"Not Disturbing Mammoth 1 [Mono]"	AFX	Analord 11 (EP) (2009 reissue)	2:05	2009	
"Not Disturbing Mammoth 2 [Mono]"	AFX	Analord 11 (EP) (2009 reissue)	2:00	2009	
"oberheim blacet1b"	AFX	Orphaned Deejay Selek 2006–08 (EP)	3:25	2015	
"Omgyjya-Switch7"	Aphex Twin	Drukqs	4:46	2001	
"On"	Aphex Twin	On (EP)	7:03	1993	
"On the Romance Tip"	Caustic Window	Joyrex J5 EP (EP)	5:04	1992	
"Orban Eq Trx 4"	Aphex Twin	Drukqs	1:27	2001	
"Organ Plodder"	Mike & Rich	Expert Knob Twiddlers (2016 reissue)	4:15	2016	
"oslo 2 +6.1"	The Tuss	Rushup Edge (2017 reissue)	2:52	2017	
"Pac-Man" (Note: Four different mixes appear on the EP: Original Mix, Ghost mix, Choci's Hi-Score Mix, and Mickey Finn's Yum Yum Mix)	Power-Pill	Pac-Man (EP)	3:32 (Note: Length of original mix)	1992	
"Pancake Lizard"	Aphex Twin	Donkey Rhubarb (EP)	4:31	1995	
"PAPAT4" [155] (pineal mix)	Aphex Twin	Syro	4:18	2014	
"Parallel Stripes"	Aphex Twin	Selected Ambient Works Volume II	8:00	1994	
"Peek 824545201"	Aphex Twin	Richard D. James Album	3:05	1996	
"Petiatil Cx Htdui"	Aphex Twin	Drukqs	2:05	2001	
"Phlange Phace"	Aphex Twin	Xylem Tube EP	5:02	1992	
"Phlaps"	Caustic Window	Caustic Window	3:50	2014	
"Phloam"	Aphex Twin	Digeridoo (EP)	5:31	1992	
"Phonatacid"	AFX	Analord 2 (EP)	9:47	2005	
"Phone Pranks"	Caustic Window	Caustic Window	2:16	2014	
"piano un1 arpej"	Aphex Twin	Computer Controlled Acoustic Instruments pt2 (EP)	0:50	2015	
"piano un10 it happened"	Aphex Twin	Computer Controlled Acoustic Instruments pt2 (EP)	1:48	2015	
"Pigeon Street"	Caustic Window	Joyrex J4 EP (EP)	0:21	1992	
"Pissed Up in SE1"	AFX	Analord 2 (EP)	5:14	2005	
"Pitcard"	AFX	Analord 7 (EP)	6:18	2005	
"Polygon Window" (Note: Later released on Surfing on Sine Waves with a duration of 5:24.)	The Dice Man	Artificial Intelligence	5:12	1992	
"Polynomial-C"	Aphex Twin	Xylem Tube EP	4:44	1992	
"Pop Corn"	Caustic Window	Joyrex J4 EP (EP)	3:38	1992	
"Popeye"	Caustic Window	Caustic Window	1:19	2014	
"Portamento Gosh"	Mike & Rich	Expert Knob Twiddlers (2016 reissue)	2:02	2016	
"Portreath Harbour"	Polygon Window	Surfing on Sine Waves (2001 reissue)	4:44	2001	
"Prep Gwarlek 3b"	Aphex Twin	Drukqs	1:13	2001	
"pretend analog extmix 2b,e2,ru"	AFX	Orphaned Deejay Selek 2006–08 (EP) (2017 reissue)	5:25	2017	
"produk 29" [101]	Aphex Twin	Syro	5:03	2014	
"Pthex"	Aphex Twin	Collapse (EP)	4:57	2018	
"Ptolemy"	Aphex Twin	Selected Ambient Works 85–92	7:10	1992	
"Pulsewidth"	Aphex Twin	Selected Ambient Works 85–92	3:46	1992	
"PWSteal.Bancos.Q"	AFX	Analord 9 (EP)	4:50	2005	
"PWSteal.Ldpinch.D"	AFX	Analord 8 (EP)	3:44	2005	
"QKThr"	Aphex Twin	Drukqs	1:27	2001	
"Quino – phec"	Polygon Window	Surfing on Sine Waves	4:42	1993	
"Quixote"	Polygon Window	Surfing on Sine Waves	6:00	1993	
"Quoth" (Note: "Original Mix" and "Wooden Thump Mix" appear on Quoth (EP).)	Polygon Window	Surfing on Sine Waves	5:34	1993	
"r8m neotek beat"	AFX	Orphaned Deejay Selek 2006–08 (EP)	1:42	2015	
"Radiator"	Aphex Twin	Selected Ambient Works Volume II	6:34	1994	
"Redruth School"	Polygon Window	Surfing on Sine Waves (2001 reissue)	2:43	2001	
"Reg"	Mike & Rich	Expert Knob Twiddlers	5:57	1996	
"Reunion 2"	AFX	Analord 5 (EP)	5:10	2005	
"Revpok"	Caustic Window	Caustic Window	3:43	2014	
"rfc pt8"	Aphex Twin	Barcelona 16.06.23 (EP)	4:13	2023	
"Rhubarb"	Aphex Twin	Selected Ambient Works Volume II	7:44	1994	
"rozzboxv2mam+4"	AFX	Orphaned Deejay Selek 2006–08 (EP) (2017 reissue)	4:35	2017	
"Ruglen Holon"	Aphex Twin	Drukqs	1:45	2001	
"Run the Place Red (AFX Mix)"	AFX	Smojphace (EP)	5:06	2003	
"Rushup i Bank 12"	The Tuss	Rushup Edge	4:40	2007	
"[S770/SCI 3000,powertran] beautiful Japanese people"	The Tuss	Rushup Edge (2017 reissue)	4:57	2017	
"s950tx16wasr10" [163.97] (earth portal mix)	Aphex Twin	Syro	6:01	2014	
"SAW2 CD1 TRK2 (Original Mix)"	Aphex Twin	26 Mixes for Cash	6:30	2003	
"Schottkey 7th Path"	Aphex Twin	Selected Ambient Works 85–92	5:08	1992	
"sekonda e,+2"	Aphex Twin	...I Care Because You Do (2017 reissue)	10:44	2017	
"serge fenix Rendered 2"	AFX	Orphaned Deejay Selek 2006–08 (EP)	3:16	2015	
"Shiny Metal Rods"	Aphex Twin	Selected Ambient Works Volume II	5:33	1994	
"Shiz Ko E"	The Tuss	Rushup Edge	3:08	2007	
"simple slamming b 2"	AFX	Orphaned Deejay Selek 2006–08 (EP)	3:51	2015	
"sk8 littletune HS-PC202"	AFX	London 03.06.17 (EP)	2:26	2017	
"snar2"	Aphex Twin	Computer Controlled Acoustic Instruments pt2 (EP)	0:20	2015	
"Snivel Chew"	AFX	Analord 6 (EP)	4:02	2005	
"Soog E"	Aphex Twin	London 19.08.2023 (EP)	3:20	2023	
"Soundlab20"	Aphex Twin	London 14.09.2019 (EP)	6:57	2019	
"The Sound of Beady Eyes"	Mike & Rich	Expert Knob Twiddlers	7:46	1996	
"Spots"	Aphex Twin	Selected Ambient Works Volume II	7:09	1994	
"Squidge in the Fridge"	Caustic Window	Caustic Window	4:09	2014	
"Stabbij"	AFX	Analord 3 (EP) (2009 reissue)	4:21	2009	
"Start as You Mean to Go On"	Aphex Twin	...I Care Because You Do	6:05	1995	
"Steppingfilter 101"	AFX	Analord 1 (EP)	4:45	2005	
"Stomper 101mod Detunekik"	Caustic Window	Caustic Window	7:26	2014	
"Stone in Focus"	Aphex Twin	Selected Ambient Works Volume II (LP release)	10:11	1994	
"stride portugal"	The Tuss	Rushup Edge (2017 reissue)	3:33	2017	
"Strotha Tynhe"	Aphex Twin	Drukqs	2:03	2001	
"Supremacy II"	Polygon Window	Surfing on Sine Waves	4:04	1993	
"Synthacon 9"	The Tuss	Rushup Edge	6:21	2007	
"syro u473t8+e" [141.98] (piezoluminescence mix)	Aphex Twin	Syro	6:32	2014	
"T03 delta 1"	AFX	London 03.06.17 (EP)	4:01	2017	
"T08 dx1+5"	AFX	London 03.06.17 (Expanded edition)	4:41	2017	
"T13 Quadraverbia N+3"	AFX	London 03.06.17 (Expanded edition)	3:14	2017	
"T16.5 MADMA with nastya+5.2"	AFX	London 03.06.17 (Expanded edition)	4:56	2017	
"T17 Phase out +3"	AFX	London 03.06.17 (Expanded edition)	4:24	2017	
"T18A pole1"	AFX	London 03.06.17 (EP)	3:44	2017	
"T20A eve 441"	AFX	London 03.06.17 (EP)	2:37	2017	
"T23 441"	AFX	London 03.06.17 (EP)	2:51	2017	
"T47 smodge"	AFX	London 03.06.17 (EP)	1:41	2017	
"T63 neotek 2h949 +3 [bonus beats]"	AFX	London 03.06.17 (Expanded edition)	1:32	2017	
"T69T07 stasspa+3"	AFX	London 03.06.17 (Expanded edition)	5:16	2017	
"T69 Collapse"	Aphex Twin	Collapse (EP)	5:22	2018	
"Taking Control"	Aphex Twin	Drukqs	7:08	2001	
"talkin2u mix2 +9"	The Tuss	Rushup Edge (2017 reissue)	3:08	2017	
"Tamphex (Hedphuq Mix)"	Aphex Twin	Xylem Tube EP	6:31	1992	
"TARDIS"	Universal Indicator	Yellow	5:57	1993	
"Tassels"	Aphex Twin	Selected Ambient Works Volume II	7:30	1994	
"th1 [evnslower]"	Aphex Twin	Selected Ambient Works Volume II (2017 reissue)	11:07	2017	
"Tha"	Aphex Twin	Selected Ambient Works 85–92	9:06	1992	
"To Cure a Weakling Child"	Aphex Twin	Richard D. James Album	4:03	1996	
"To Cure a Weakling Child, Contour Regard"	Aphex Twin	Come to Daddy (EP)	5:09	1997	
"Tree"	Aphex Twin	Selected Ambient Works Volume II	9:58	1994	
"Trojan.KILLAV.E"	AFX	Analord 9 (EP)	3:03	2005	
"tuning1"	AFX	Korg Trax+Tunings for falling asleep	0:49	2017	
"tuning2"	AFX	Korg Trax+Tunings for falling asleep	1:07	2017	
"tuning3"	AFX	Korg Trax+Tunings for falling asleep	0:49	2017	
"tuning4"	AFX	Korg Trax+Tunings for falling asleep	1:19	2017	
"tuning5"	AFX	Korg Trax+Tunings for falling asleep	0:53	2017	
"tuning seq1"	AFX	Korg Trax+Tunings for falling asleep	1:03	2017	
"tuning seq1 ph2"	AFX	Korg Trax+Tunings for falling asleep	1:49	2017	
"tuning seq2"	AFX	Korg Trax+Tunings for falling asleep	1:35	2017	
"tuning seq2 ph2"	AFX	Korg Trax+Tunings for falling asleep	1:52	2017	
"tuning seq3"	AFX	Korg Trax+Tunings for falling asleep	2:17	2017	
"tuning seq4"	AFX	Korg Trax+Tunings for falling asleep	2:10	2017	
"tuning seq5"	AFX	Korg Trax+Tunings for falling asleep	1:21	2017	
"umil 25-01"	AFX	Orphaned Deejay Selek 2006–08 (EP) (2017 reissue)	4:48	2017	
"Untitled"	Aphex Twin	Analog Bubblebath Vol 2 (EP)	3:44	1991	
"(untitled)" ("Elephant Song")	AFX	Analogue Bubblebath 4 (EP)	6:22	1994	
"(untitled)" ("Gibbon")	AFX	Analogue Bubblebath 4 (EP)	5:08	1994	
"(untitled)" ("Cuckoo")	AFX	Analogue Bubblebath 4 (EP)	6:04	1994	
"(untitled)" ("Sloth")	AFX	Analogue Bubblebath 4 (EP)	8:21	1994	
"(untitled)" ("Knievel")	AFX	Analogue Bubblebath 4 (EP) (2003 CD reissue)	0:27	2003	
"(untitled)"	Bradley Strider	Bradley's Robot (EP)	5:50	1993	
"(untitled)"	Caustic Window	Joyrex J5 EP (EP)	3:42	1992	
"(untitled)"	Polygon Window	Surfing on Sine Waves	6:24	1993	
"Upright Kangaroo"	Mike & Rich	Expert Knob Twiddlers	3:31	1996	
"UT1 – dot"	Polygon Window	Surfing on Sine Waves	5:17	1993	
"Vaz Deferenz"	Aphex Twin	Donkey Rhubarb (EP)	5:49	1995	
"VBS.Redlof.B"	AFX	Analord 11 (EP)	4:39	2005	
"Ventolin" (Note: Appears in six different mixes on Ventolin (EP). A version subtitled the "video version" appears on ...I Care Because You Do.)	Aphex Twin	Ventolin (EP)	4:29 (Note: Length on ...I Care Because You Do. Length varies between two and six minutes on the Ventolin EP.)	1995	
"Vodka"	Mike & Rich	Expert Knob Twiddlers	4:12	1996	
"Vodka (Mix 2)"	Mike & Rich	Expert Knob Twiddlers (2016 reissue)	4:22	2016	
"Vordhosbn"	Aphex Twin	Drukqs	4:42	2001	
"W32.Aphex@mm"	AFX	Analord 9 (EP)	3:52	2005	
"W32.Deadcode.A"	AFX	Analord 8 (EP)	6:18	2005	
"W32.Mydoom.AU@mm"	AFX	Analord 11 (EP)	8:47	2005	
"Wabby Acid"	AFX	Analord 7 (EP) (2009 reissue)	3:33	2009	
"Wabby Legs"	AFX	Hangable Auto Bulb EP (EP)	5:29	1995	
"Waltz"	Mike & Rich	Expert Knob Twiddlers (2016 reissue)	5:24	2016	
"Wax the Nip"	Aphex Twin	...I Care Because You Do	4:19	1995	
"The Waxen Pith"	Aphex Twin	...I Care Because You Do	4:50	1995	
"We Are the Music Makers"	Aphex Twin	Selected Ambient Works 85–92	7:43	1992	
"We Are the Music Makers (Hardcore Mix)"	Caustic Window	Joyrex J9ii (EP)	3:59	1993	
"We Have Arrived (Aphex Twin QQT Mix)"	Aphex Twin	Classics	4:23	1994	
"We Have Arrived (Aphex Twin TTQ Mix)"	Aphex Twin	Classics	4:23	1994	
"Weathered Stone"	Aphex Twin	Selected Ambient Works Volume II	6:54	1994	
"Wet Tip Hen Ax"	Aphex Twin	...I Care Because You Do	5:17	1995	
"Where's Your Girlfriend?"	AFX	Analord 1 (EP)	5:06	2005	
"White Blur 1"	Aphex Twin	Selected Ambient Works Volume II	2:43	1994	
"White Blur 2"	Aphex Twin	Selected Ambient Works Volume II	11:27	1994	
"winding road ,e,+4.1"	Aphex Twin	...I Care Because You Do (2017 reissue)	3:15	2017	
"Windowlicker"	Aphex Twin	Non-album single	6:07	1999	
"Windowlicker (Acid Edit)"	Aphex Twin	26 Mixes for Cash	4:15	2003	
"Windowsill"	Aphex Twin	Selected Ambient Works Volume II	7:16	1994	
"Winner Takes All"	Mike & Rich	Expert Knob Twiddlers	5:44	1996	
"with my family [48k]"	Aphex Twin	...I Care Because You Do (2017 reissue)	4:11	2017	
"Xepha"	Aphex Twin	On (EP)	5:42	1993	
"XMAS_EVET1 N"	Aphex Twin	Non-album single B-side to "MARCHROMT30A edit 2b 96"	5:09	2015	
"XMAS_EVET10" [120] (thanaton3 mix)	Aphex Twin	Syro	10:31	2014	
"Xmd 5a"	Aphex Twin	Analord 10 (EP)	7:55	2005	
"Xtal"	Aphex Twin	Selected Ambient Works 85–92	4:54	1992	
"Yellow Calx"	Aphex Twin	Richard D. James Album	3:04	1996	
"Z Twig"	Aphex Twin	Selected Ambient Works Volume II	2:05	1994	
"Ziggomatic 17"	Aphex Twin	Drukqs	8:28	2001	
"Zin2 Test5"	Aphex Twin	Blackbox Life Recorder 21f / in a room7 F760 (EP)	2:39	2023	
