= Come to Daddy =

Come to Daddy may refer to:

- Come to Daddy (EP), 1997 extended play by Aphex Twin
  - Come to Daddy (song), it's title track
- Come to Daddy (film), 2019 film
