= Come to Daddy (EP) =

1997 double EP by Aphex Twin

EP by Aphex Twin
- Released: 6 October 1997
- Genre: IDM; drum and bass; drill 'n' bass
- Length: 33:22
- Label: Warp
- Producer: Aphex Twin a.k.a. Richard D. James

Richard D. James chronology
Analogue Bubblebath 3.1 (1997)	Come to Daddy (1997)	Caustic Window Compilation (1998)

Singles from Come to Daddy
- 1. "Come to Daddy" Released: 6 October 1997

Professional ratings
Review scores
Source	Rating
AllMusic	4/5 stars
Almost Cool	8/10
Pitchfork	7.2/10
The Rolling Stone Album Guide	4/5 stars
Spin	7/10

Come to Daddy is a double EP by the British electronic music artist Aphex Twin. The EP's lead single, and the first track on the EP, "Come to Daddy (Pappy Mix)"—often simply called "Come to Daddy"—is one of Aphex Twin's best-known songs; it peaked at number 36 on the UK Singles Chart.

== Composition ==
Come to Daddy has been described as featuring drum and bass beats throughout. Each mix of "Come to Daddy" is seemingly unrelated, with the "Little Lord Faulteroy" and "Mummy" mixes bearing no noticeable resemblance to the original "Pappy" mix. "To Cure a Weakling Child (Contour Regard)" is a remix of the song "To Cure a Weakling Child" from Richard D. James Album. Six of Come to Daddy's eight tracks feature vocals.

According to Sean Booth of Autechre, James' track "Bucephalus Bouncing Ball" is a reaction to their track "Drane", to which they then replied with the track "Drane2".

== Packaging ==
Come to Daddy's packaging features stark black letters against a white background. All the information, track listings and lyrics are printed the same way, and only two images are present, both photographed by Stefan DeBatselier and digitally altered by Chris Cunningham, using James' face on children. James has used his likeness as the artwork on five of his releases: The ...I Care Because You Do and Richard D. James Album albums, Donkey Rhubarb, Come to Daddy and the "Windowlicker" single.

The cover of the out-of-print second CD, with its white lettering against an orange background, makes reference to the fact that "To Cure a Weakling Child" had been used in a television advertisement for Orange. However, the advertisement used an edit of the album version, whilst the version that appears on the EP is the radically different "Contour Regard" mix.

== Track listing ==
All tracks written, produced and engineered by Richard D. James.

No.	Title	Length
1.	"Come to Daddy" (Pappy mix)	4:22
2.	"Flim"	2:57
3.	"Come to Daddy" (Little Lord Faulteroy mix)	3:50
4.	"Bucephalus Bouncing Ball"	5:44
5.	"To Cure a Weakling Child" (Contour Regard)	5:10
6.	"Funny Little Man"	3:58
7.	"Come to Daddy" (Mummy mix)	4:24
8.	"IZ-US"	2:57
Total length:		33:22

2017 re-release bonus tracks
No.	Title	Length
9.	"forgotten life path"	2:28
10.	"bank lullaby"	1:49
11.	"28 organ 1.1 [ru,ec,+9]"	6:40
Total length:		44:17

All vinyl editions of Come to Daddy (excluding a promotional double LP limited to 500 copies) exclude tracks 5–8.

The tracks were originally released on two separate CDs, WAP94CD and WAP94CDR, with the first four tracks on the former and the rest on the latter. These have since been replaced by one EP containing all eight tracks (WAP94CDX).

== Personnel ==
- Aphex Twin – vocals, keyboards, synthesizers, piano, drum machine, percussion
- Chris Cunningham – images
- Stefan de Batselier – photography

== Charts ==
Chart (1997)	Peak Position
US Heatseekers Albums (Billboard)	37

== Certifications ==
Region	Certification	Certified units/sales
United Kingdom (BPI)	Silver	60,000^{^}
^{^} Shipments figures based on certification alone.
