= Hangable Auto Bulb =

EP by AFX
- Released: EP1: 16 October 1995; EP2: 11 December 1995
- Recorded: August–October 1995
- Genres: IDM, drill 'n' bass
- Length: EP1: 25:05; EP2: 9:04; CD: 34:47
- Label: Warp
- Producer: Richard D. James

Richard D. James chronology
Bradley's Beat (1995)	Hangable Auto Bulb (1995)	Expert Knob Twiddlers (1996)

Original covers
- EP1

Alternative cover
- EP2

Hangable Auto Bulb is a series of two 1995 EPs by electronic musician Richard D. James, under his alias AFX. The two were re-released by Warp Records as a single album on 31 October 2005. They marked James's first foray into rapid drill 'n' bass style beat programming.

== Overview ==
Split across two 12" EPs, the second released eight weeks after the first, and each were limited to 1000 pressings. The records marked a significant change in sound from previous AFX and Aphex Twin releases. Moving away from the analogue sounds of ...I Care Because You Do (1995), the tracks show James experimenting with computer-arranged breakbeat programming and timestretched samples inspired by drum and bass; this style would become known as "drill 'n' bass", and would become the dominant sound in his work up until the Analord releases of 2005.

The records were influenced by the early EPs of fellow Cornish producer Plug (Luke Vibert), as well as other drum and bass movements of the day. The CD cover is by The Designers Republic.

== Reception ==
Hangable Auto Bulb EP
Review scores
Source	Rating
AllMusic	4.5/5 stars

Hangable Auto Bulb EP.2
Review scores
Source	Rating
AllMusic	4/5 stars

CD release
Review scores
Source	Rating
AllMusic	4.5/5 stars
The Guardian	4/5 stars
Pitchfork	8.9/10
PopMatters	7/10
Release Magazine	8/10

In 2005 The Guardian called the reissued EPs "pioneering sonically" and stated that "this music still sounds utterly alien as James morphs the fractured volatile beats with ambient melody." Mark Richardson of Pitchfork stated that the reissue's "tension, between the otherworldly yet effortlessly tuneful melodies purring along beneath drums that constantly struggle to frame them, is what the ensuing era of James' music is all about, and Hangable Auto Bulb is a hell of an intro."

== Track listing ==
=== 12" EPs ===
Hangable Auto Bulb EP (1995)
No.	Title	Length
1.	"Children Talking"	5:19
2.	"Hangable Auto Bulb"	6:48
3.	"Laughable Butane Bob"	2:58
4.	"Bit"	0:06
5.	"Custodian Discount"	4:25
6.	"Wabby Legs"	5:29
Total length:		25:05

Hangable Auto Bulb EP.2 (1995)
No.	Title	Length
1.	"Every Day"	3:44
2.	"Arched Maid Via RDJ"	5:20
Total length:		9:04

=== CD ===
No.	Title	Length
1.	"Children Talking"	5:22
2.	"Hangable Auto Bulb"	6:52
3.	"Laughable Butane Bob"	3:02
4.	"Bit"	0:11
5.	"Custodian Discount"	4:30
6.	"Wabby Legs"	5:35
7.	"Every Day"	3:50
8.	"Arched Maid Via RDJ"	5:25
Total length:		34:47

=== 2017 digital bonus tracks ===
No.	Title	Length
9.	"get a baby"	2:27
10.	"choirDrilll"	4:12
Total length:		41:26

The CD lengths are slightly different from the original EPs. On some pressings, tracks 7 and 8 are erroneously reversed.

== Samples ==
The tracks "Children Talking," "Every Day," and "get a baby" feature samples from the 1961 BBC Radio series titled "Children Talking", in which Harold Williamson traveled the United Kingdom asking children questions about aspects of their lives.

== Anagrams ==
The album's title is an anagram of "Analogue Bublbath", a reference to James' previous AFX release series, Analogue Bubblebath.

Also, as on James' previous album …I Care Because You Do, a number of the track titles are anagrams or near-anagrams:

- of Analogue Bubblebath: "Laughable Butane Bob"
- of Analogue Bublbath [sic]: "Hangable Auto Bulb"
- of Richard David Jame [sic]: "Arched Maid Via RDJ"
- of Caussttic Ouinnddo [sic] (correctly spelled "Caustic Window"): "Custodian Discount"
