= Classics (Aphex Twin album) =

1995 compilation album by the Aphex Twin

Compilation album by Aphex Twin
- Released: 30 January 1995
- Genres: Acid techno, hardcore techno
- Length: 74:03
- Label: R&S Records
- Producer: Richard D. James

Richard D. James chronology
Analogue Bubblebath 4 (1994)	Classics (1995)	Ventolin E.P (1995)

Aphex Twin album chronology
Selected Ambient Works Volume II (1994)	Classics (1995)	...I Care Because You Do (1995)

Alternative cover
- Reissue cover

Professional ratings
Review scores
Source	Rating
AllMusic	4/5 stars
The Rolling Stone Album Guide	3/5 stars

Classics is a 1995 compilation album by the electronic music artist and producer Richard D. James, more commonly known by his pseudonym of Aphex Twin.

The album collects James's early releases, including the Analogue Bubblebath, Digeridoo, and Xylem Tube EPs with a handful of other songs, including remixes of Mescalinum United's "We Have Arrived". It was released by R&S Records following James' success on Warp Records. James was not involved in the release of this compilation.

A remastered version of the album was released on 2 June 2008. The cover for this reissue resembles that of Selected Ambient Works 85–92, albeit with the black and white inverted.

== Background ==
James' first release was the 1991 12-inch EP Analogue Bubblebath on Mighty Force Records. In 1991 James and Grant Wilson-Claridge founded Rephlex Records to promote "innovation in the dynamics of Acid — a much-loved and misunderstood genre of house music forgotten by some and indeed new to others, especially in Britain". From 1991 to 1993 James released two Analogue Bubblebath EPs as AFX and an EP, Bradley's Beat, as Bradley Strider. Although he moved to London to take an electronics course at Kingston Polytechnic, he admitted to David Toop that his electronics studies were slipping away as he pursued a career in the techno genre. After leaving school James remained in the city, releasing albums and EPs on Warp Records and other labels under a number of aliases (including AFX, Polygon Window and Power-Pill); several of his tracks, released under aliases including Blue Calx and The Dice Man, appeared on compilations. Although he allegedly lived on the roundabout in Elephant and Castle, South London during his early years there, he actually resided in a nearby unoccupied bank.

In 1992 James also released the Xylem Tube EP and Digeridoo (first played by DJ Colin Faver on London's Kiss FM) as Aphex Twin, the Pac-Man EP (based on the arcade game) as Power-Pill, and two of his four Joyrex EPs (Joyrex J4 EP and Joyrex J5 EP) as Caustic Window. "Digeridoo" reached #55 on the UK Singles Chart, and was later described by Rolling Stone as foreshadowing drum and bass. He wrote "Digeridoo" to clear up his audience after a rave. These early releases were on Rephlex Records, Mighty Force of Exeter and R&S Records of Belgium.

James had no creative input and was against the release of this compilation, accusing R&S of "milking as much money as they can out of me, because they know I'm not going to give them any more records."

== Track listing ==
All tracks are written by Richard David James unless noted.

No.	Title	Remix of	Length
1.	"Digeridoo"		7:12
2.	"Flaphead"		7:00
3.	"Phloam"		5:33
4.	"Isopropanol"		6:23
5.	"Polynomial-C"		4:46
6.	"Tamphex" (Hedphuq mix)		6:31
7.	"Phlange Phace"		5:22
8.	"Dodeccaheedron"		6:08
9.	"Analogue Bubblebath"		4:46
10.	"Metapharstic"		4:33
11.	"We Have Arrived" (Aphex Twin QQT mix)	"We Have Arrived" by Mescalinum United	4:23
12.	"We Have Arrived" (Aphex Twin TTQ mix)	"We Have Arrived" by Mescalinum United	5:06
13.	"Digeridoo" (live in Cornwall, 1990)		6:21
Total length:			74:09

== Notes ==
- "Isopropanol" is an extended mix of "Isopropophlex" from James's Analogue Bubblebath. The track time, 6:23, matches that of "Isopropophlex" from the original Digeridoo EP.
- "Analogue Bubblebath 1" is extended by a few seconds from its original version, with a different ending. It was the track included on some versions of the Digeridoo EP instead of "Isopropanol".
- "Tamphex" contains looping samples from a television advertisement for Tampax.
- This album was chosen as one of Q magazine's 50 heaviest albums of all time in July 2001 and noted for its crunching, metallic malevolence.
- "We Have Arrived (Aphex Twin QQT mix)" was later re-released on the remix compilation 26 Mixes for Cash.
- A 3rd remix of We Have Arrived appeared on his 2015/2016 SoundCloud dump (a collection of 275+ "leftover" tracks from all eras of his career) under the title "Pcp 2 (unreleased version)".

== Personnel ==
- Richard D. James (Aphex Twin) – synthesizer, producer
- The Mover – producer

== Charts ==
Chart (1995)	Peak position
UK Albums Chart	24
