= Richard D. James Album =

1996 studio album by Aphex Twin

Studio album by Aphex Twin
- Released: 4 November 1996
- Genres: Drill 'n' bass; IDM; electronica; jungle; experimental; art pop
- Length: 32:51
- Label: Warp
- Producer: Richard D. James

Richard D. James chronology
Girl/Boy EP (1996)	Richard D. James Album (1996)	Analogue Bubblebath Vol 3.1 (1997)

Aphex Twin album chronology
...I Care Because You Do (1995)	Richard D. James Album (1996)	Drukqs (2001)

Richard D. James Album is a studio album by the British electronic music artist and producer Aphex Twin. It was released on 4 November 1996 through Warp Records. It was composed by James on his Macintosh computer, and took longer to complete than his previous albums. It features fast breakbeats and intricate drum programming which draw from jungle and drum and bass. James' percussion is paired with lush string arrangements, and ambient melodies reminiscent of his earlier work, as well as modulated vocals from James.

Richard D. James Album entered the Dance Albums Chart at No. 7, and reached No. 62 on the Albums Chart. In the US it charted at No. 20 on Billboard's Top Heatseekers Albums chart. It had sold over 100,000 units by 1997, making it Warp's most commercially successful release at the time. It received critical acclaim, with much of the praise going to its production. It has since been described as one of the best albums of 1996 and the 1990s overall by music critics.

== Background and production ==
James's experimentation with faster breakbeats was inspired by Luke Vibert.

In 1995, Richard James released the two Hangable Auto Bulb EPs under his AFX moniker, experimenting with exaggerated rhythms inspired by drum and bass in a style that came to be called "drill 'n' bass". This faster style of drum programming was inspired by James' friend Luke Vibert, also known as Plug. James stated that while he worked with triplets and complicated beats in the past, that Vibert "got me into doing it a faster pace. He gave me the spark to do it faster, but now I'm trying to take it to all extremes". This rapid, computer-based approach would become the dominant style of James's work through the end of the decade. In the following year, James released the Aphex Twin EP Girl/Boy.

James has stated that most of the album was composed on his Macintosh computer and that the album took longer to create than any of his previous albums. Describing his approach to drum programming, he stated that "sometimes I just hit the keyboard in a way I'd like the rhythm of the tracks to sound. Then I'll spend four hours moving all the notes where I want them to go." Some tracks on the album include James' vocals modulated on a computer; in "To Cure a Weakling Child", James manipulated his voice to sound like a child giving a lecture about their arms and legs. For the orchestral arrangements on the album, James bought a violin at a car boot sale. He used the instrument by placing it on a table, playing a note, and sampling the note.

== Composition ==
Richard D. James Album is a work of electronica that has been characterised as James's "swan dive into jungle and drill'n'bass" by Vice's Dan Weiss, and labeled as a work of IDM by Pitchfork, working with jungle, drum and bass and ambient and acid techno in some tracks. Andrew Spiess of PopMatters noted that '[w]hat makes Richard D. James Album stand out among James' previous works is the synthesis of delicate, symphonic sounds and hard, jackhammering beats," noting that the album consolidated his 1995 entry into the short-lived drill 'n' bass subgenre. James has claimed the influence of jungle music came from "any of the drum 'n' bass and breakbeat artists" and that he has "always been into nicking other things [...] and making something different". Patric Fallon of Stereogum noted the album heavily relies on drum programming, sampling, and "other digital intricacies that would've been otherwise unthinkable without computers". It also features lush string arrangements and simple keyboard textures built over quadruple time breakbeats. A reviewer for Spectrum Culture wrote that the album used unstable time signatures. Steve Taylor found the record Aphex Twin's "most terrifying" one, with "weird stop-start beats, white noise and tough melodies."

"4"
A sample of "4", a track that features slower melodies underneath faster paced breakbeats.

John Bush of AllMusic noted that the album continued James's "forays into acid-jungle and experimental music," noting that the album was "more extreme than virtually all jungle being made at the time", with beats layered over slower melodies that characterised James' earlier ambient works. Eric Carr of Pitchfork opined that the album was one of the "aggressive combinations of disparate electronic forms", with "almost-brutal contrast between its elements". Exclaim! commented that tracks such as "Girl/Boy Song", "Yellow Calx", and "Peek 824545201" were "loosely based on jungle". Spin's Will Hermes linked the album's use of vocals, both sung and sampled, its cover artwork and title, stating that "Richard D. James might be the first electronica LP that not only gropes for narrative but also aspired to an abstract sort of autobiography."

== Release ==
Richard D. James Album was released through Warp on 4 November 1996. It was released on compact disc, cassette and LP; early copies of the album were distributed with a plastic sachet containing James' hair. The American version included the Girl/Boy EP as bonus tracks. The album entered at number 7 on the Dance Albums Chart and at number 62 on the Albums Chart in the UK, on 16 November 1996. It was released in the United States through Sire Records on 28 January 1997 and charted at number 20 on Billboard's Top Heatseekers Albums chart. By November 1997, it had sold over 100,000 copies and became Warp's most commercially successful release at the time, the former of which surprised James.

Along with ...I Care Because You Do (1995), Richard D. James Album was reissued on vinyl on 18 September 2012 by record label 1972. Warp announced their own re-issue of the album on 180-gram vinyl for 8 October 2012.

== Critical reception ==
Professional ratings
Review scores
Source	Rating
AllMusic	4.5/5 stars
Entertainment Weekly	A−
Future Music	4/5 stars
Muzik	4.5/5
NME	8/10
Pitchfork	8.4/10 (1996); 9.3/10 (2026)
Rolling Stone	3.5/5 stars
The Rolling Stone Album Guide	4/5 stars
Spin	7/10
The Village Voice	B+

Richard D. James Album received acclaim from music critics. In the United Kingdom, The Independent's Ben Thompson wrote that "The intuitive sense of melody [James has] been striving so hard to suppress over the last few years has come to the fore too, and the result is the most magical pop record of the year: the year in question being AD 2001." NME reviewer Ted Kessler praised its sense of "fresh musical perception" and called it "a record that's absorbed the rhythmic advances made by drum'n'bass in places ... yet scribbles furiously over its roots with sparkly chemical melodies and splintered clanging". Martin James of Muzik remarked on the album's "Squarepusher-esque rhythmical assaults" and deviation from previous Aphex Twin records, finding that Richard D. James Album "succeeds because you get the feeling that this time round, he's laughing with you rather than at you." In Future Music, Andy Jones summarised it as sounding "like a list of sparky ideas all taped as one-offs ... From genius to sheer madness. Sometimes unlistenable but never dull."

In North America, Pitchfork's Ryan Schreiber stated that "The Richard D. James Album is 43.5 minutes of pure electronic genius" and "just when your brain starts to comprehend a rhythmic pattern, the beat shifts, turns left and crushes your torso under the steering wheel." Rolling Stone's Jason Fine commented that "Aphex Twin coaxes great emotional resonance from his machines" and combines "jolting beats, pristine melodic fragments and random noises into elegant – if at times unnerving – futuristic pop." However, he also commented that "not all of Richard D. James goes down easy." Marc Widenbaum of Pulse! called the album, "quite simply, the strongest art-pop record to appear since Laurie Anderson's Mr. Heartbreak", defined by a "series of lovely tunes atop a decisive, rhythmically fascinating girding of rapid-fire, turn-on-a-dime percussion." Entertainment Weekly writer David Browne called it James' "quirkiest, most personal work" and said that "4" and "Girl/Boy Song" revealed "a new warmth and wistfulness". Mark Jenkins of The Washington Post gave the album a negative review, referring to the music as "sloppy", "offhand", "a noisy mess" and sounding "like a private joke".

Richard D. James Album was placed in numerous best-of lists. NME placed the album at number 20 on their list of the best albums of 1996. The Wire also listed the album among their top 50 albums of the year for 1996. In 2003 Pitchfork listed their top albums of the 1990s, with Richard D. James Album ranking at 40. Pitchfork stated that RDJ is not "easily dated by [its] technology", and doesn't "sound stale compared to modern variations." Also in 2003, NME ranked it 55th in their list of the top 100 albums of all time. Slant Magazine placed the album at number 91 on their list of the top 100 albums of the 1990s, describing it as "more fascinated by textures than almost any other electronic album ever crafted". In 2015 Spin placed the album at number 71 on their list of the best albums of the past 30 years. In the same year, Exclaim! listed Richard D. James Album on their list of Essential Richard D. James albums. The review opined that the album was "not necessarily a release that you immediately fall in love with", but that it was "endlessly rewarding". Evening Standard named it among "the most influential electronica albums of the past 20 years." In 2019, Reverb called the album "perhaps the best-known IDM release of all time" and a "highwater mark" for the genre.

== Track listing ==
All tracks are credited as being written and produced by "Me" (Richard D. James).

Physical (UK) and digital editions
No.	Title	Length
1.	"4"	3:37
2.	"Cornish Acid"	2:14
3.	"Peek 824545201"	3:05
4.	"Fingerbib"	3:48
5.	"Carn Marth"	2:33
6.	"To Cure a Weakling Child"	4:03
7.	"Goon Gumpas"	2:02
8.	"Yellow Calx"	3:04
9.	"Girl/Boy Song" (NLS mix)	4:52
10.	"Logan Rock Witch"	3:33
Total length:		32:51

American, Australian, and Japanese edition bonus tracks (Girl/Boy EP)
No.	Title	Length
11.	"Milkman"	4:09
12.	"Inkey$"	1:24
13.	"Girl/Boy" (£18 Snare Rush mix)	1:57
14.	"Beetles"	1:31
15.	"Girl/Boy" (Redruth mix)	1:37
Total length:		43:29

== Personnel ==
Credits from the back cover of the album.

- Aphex Twin (credited as "Me") – writer, producer, sleeve
- Johnny Clayton – sleeve

== Charts ==
Chart performance for Richard D. James Album
Chart (1996–1997)	Peak position
UK Albums (Official Charts)	62
UK Dance Albums (Official Charts)	7
US Top Heatseekers (Billboard)	20
Chart (2023)	Peak position
UK Dance Albums (Official Charts)	39

== Sales ==
Sales for Richard D. James Album
Region	Certification	Certified units/sales
United Kingdom	—	30,000
United States	—	50,000
Summaries
Worldwide	—	100,000

== See also ==
- 1996 in music
- Music of the United Kingdom (1990s)

== Footnotes ==
=== Bibliography ===
- Larkin, Colin (2011). "Aphex Twin". The Encyclopedia of Popular Music (5th concise ed.). Omnibus Press. ISBN 978-0-85712-595-8.
- Kirn, Peter (2011). "12". Keyboard Presents the Evolution of Electronic Dance Music. Backbeat Books. ISBN 978-1-61713-446-3.
- Taylor, Steve (2006). "Aphex Twin". The A to X of Alternative Music. A&C Black. ISBN 978-0-82-648217-4 – via Internet Archive.
- Thompson, Ben (1998). "Aphex Twin". Seven Years of Plenty (Paperback ed.). Phoenix Press. pp. 138–142. ISBN 0-75380-854-4.
