= London 03.06.17 =

EP by AFX
- Released: 3 June 2017
- Genre: Electronic
- Length: 1:10:03
- Label: Warp
- Producer: Richard D. James

AFX chronology
Orphaned Deejay Selek 2006–08 (2016)	London 03.06.17 (2017)	Orphans (2017)

London 03.06.17 (alternatively titled London 03.06.17 [field day]) is an extended play (EP) by English electronic musician Richard D. James, released under the pseudonym AFX on 3 June 2017 through Warp. The EP contained eleven songs and was made available for sale in limited numbers at the Field Day 2017 music festival. The record sold out soon after its announcement. On 20 July 2017, the EP was re-released with ten extra tracks on James' Bleep store.

== Background ==
On 27 November 2016, Richard D. James was revealed to be a headlining act for the Field Day 2017 music festival, being his first public performance in four years. Field Day 2017 was scheduled to take place on 3 June 2017, with James performing on the same day. London 03.06.17 was not previously announced to be released prior to Field Day. Instead, it was surprise-released and sold exclusively at the on-site merchandise stand. By 2:00pm that day, the vinyl record was entirely sold out.

== Release ==
London 03.06.17 was originally released exclusively on vinyl on 3 June 2017. It was packaged in an Aphex Twin branded bag. After Field Day concluded, many fans were outraged due to scalpers and other attendees reselling the record for extremely high prices.

On 20 July 2017, with the launch of James' Bleep store, London 03.06.17 was re-released digitally. It originally launched with six bonus tracks, however this was later expanded to eleven as of April 2024. This digital re-release was now titled London 03.06.17 [field day].

On 17 December 2024 the tracks of London 03.06.17 were re-released onto streaming platforms as a part of a new compilation album, Music from the Merch Desk (2016–2023).

== Track listing ==
No.	Title	Length
1.	"42DIMENSIT3 e3"	4:40
2.	"MT1T1 bedroom microtune"	3:47
3.	"T18A pole1"	3:44
4.	"T03 delta t"	4:01
5.	"em2500 M253X"	1:50
6.	"T23 441"	2:51
7.	"42DIMENSIT10"	3:06
8.	"T20A ede 441"	2:37
9.	"MT1T2 olpedroom"	1:57
10.	"T47 smodge"	1:41
11.	"sk8 littletune HS-PC202"	2:26
Total length:		32:40

aphextwin.warp.net exclusive tracks
No.	Title	Length
12.	"T13 Quadraverbia N+3"	3:14
13.	"T17 Phase out +3"	4:24
14.	"T63 neotek 2h949 +3 [bonus beats]"	1:32
15.	"T16.5 MADMA with nastya+5.2"	4:56
16.	"T08 dx1+5"	6:41
17.	"T69T07 stasspa+3"	5:16
18.	"T05 tx16w marion MT***,e [sketches]"	4:04
19.	"T46 se70 rinseout2 [sketches]"	2:19
20.	"ZT01 [sketch1]"	3:10
21.	"TXT1+4 ds8 flngchrods[sketch0.1b]"	3:47
Total length:		1:10:03
