= Xylem Tube EP =

EP by Aphex Twin
- Released: 1 June 1992
- Genre: Acid techno
- Length: 22:38
- Label: R&S Records
- Producer: Richard D. James

Richard D. James chronology
Pac-Man (1992)	Xylem Tube EP (1992)	Joyrex J4 EP (1992)

Xylem Tube EP is an extended play record by the electronic music artist and producer Aphex Twin. It was released on 1 June 1992 through the Belgian label R&S Records. All songs on the EP can be found on the 1994 compilation album Classics. The EP consists of four acid techno tracks, including "Polynomial-C" which features a complex arpeggio, and "Tamphex", a hardcore techno track featuring a looping sample of a Tampax television advert.

This was the first Aphex Twin release to feature his signature logo, designed by Paul Nicholson.

== Track listing ==
All tracks are written by Richard David James.

Side A
No.	Title	Length
1.	"Polynomial-C"	4:42
2.	"Tamphex" (Hedphuq Mix)	6:28
Total length:		11:10

Side B
No.	Title	Length
3.	"Phlange Phace"	5:18
4.	"Dodeccaheedron"	6:05
Total length:		22:38
