= Expert Knob Twiddlers =

Studio album by Mike & Rich
- Released: June 24, 1996
- Recorded: 1994
- Genre: IDM; electro-funk; easy listening
- Length: 57:51
- Label: Rephlex

Richard D. James chronology
Hangable Auto Bulb (1995)	Expert Knob Twiddlers (1996)	Girl/Boy EP (1996)

Expert Knob Twiddlers is a 1996 studio album by Mike Paradinas and Richard D. James. It was released in 1996 on Rephlex Records and is the only release credited to the two as Mike & Rich.

On 14 July 2016 Planet Mu announced that a reissued version would be released with seven bonus tracks in September 2016.

== Production ==
Mike Paradinas described the sound of the album as "an updated version of easy listening and funk". James had heard the music Paradinas had made under the name of Jake Slazenger and invited him to create tracks. Paradinas noted James had invited other artists to collaborate with him, including Luke Vibert, Squarepusher and Cylob and was honoured that his collaborative tracks were chosen for the release. Both artists were getting drunk while developing tracks, something that Paradinas stated that neither artist regularly did.

The track "Giant Deflating Football" was written during the 1994 FIFA World Cup. Paradinas noted that the two "were able to quite quickly write a large amount of material. 'Giant Deflating Football' is named because it had some quite weird percussion sounds made by scraping and blowing in a microphone. It sounded like a big wheezing football. We took a bit of acid afterwards to listen to it, and we were coming out with some imagery like 'Beady Eyes,' which is mentioned in one of the tracks."

== Release ==
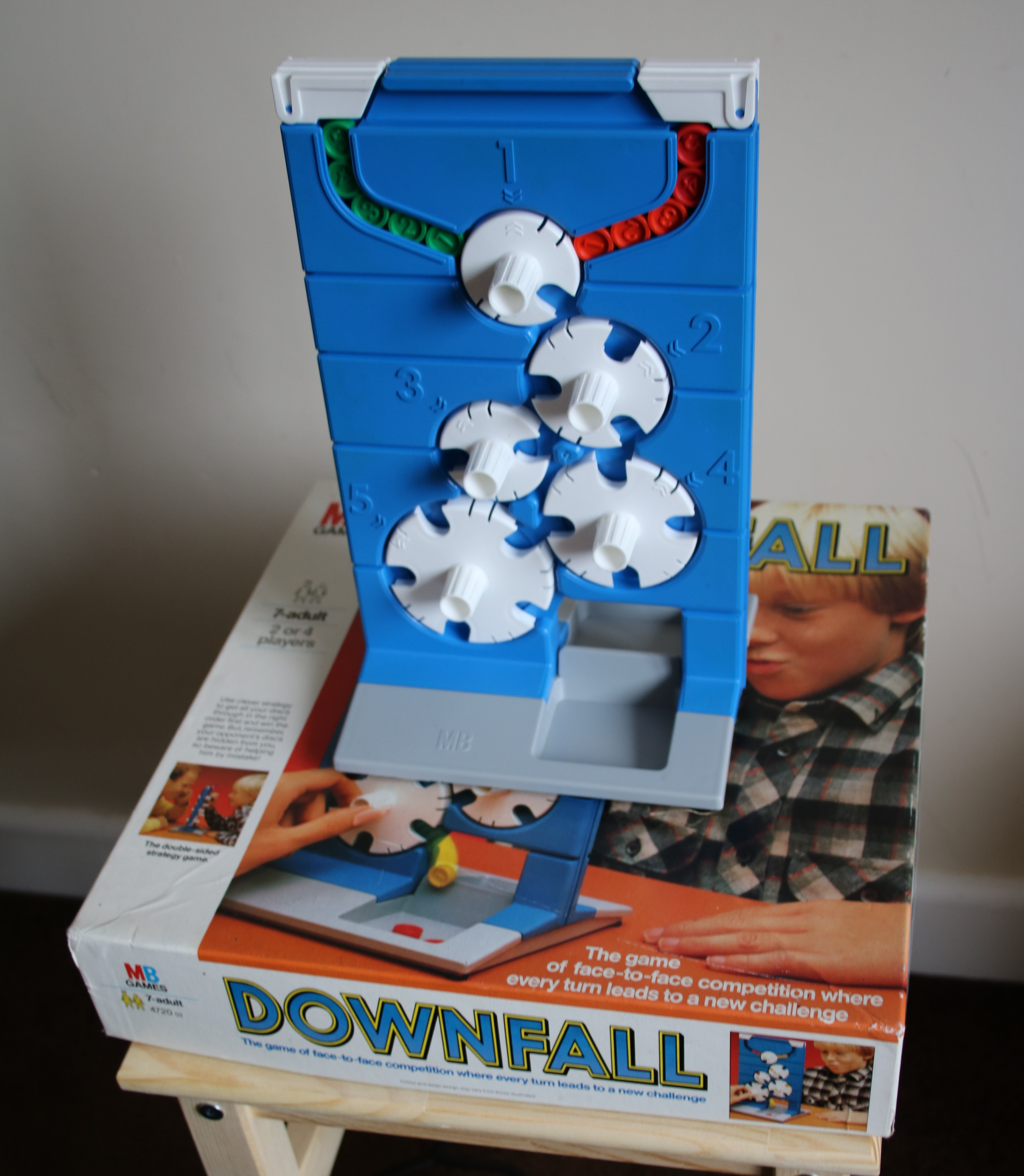
The cover of the album features Paradinas and James playing the Milton Bradley game Downfall, whilst also parodying the box art of the original game.

Expert Knob Twiddlers was released by Rephlex Records on 24 June 1996 on audio cassette, compact disc and vinyl. Paradinas felt the album should have been released as early as 1994, stating that "At that time, that style was something that no one else had done [...] It wasn't like anything anyone heard before really. By the time it did come out, a lot of things came out like Carbon Trio and there was a lot of revived interest in easy listening. Neither of us was prepared for it."

On 19 July 2016 the song "Vodka (Mix 2)" was released with the announcement of the album's 2016 reissue.

== Reception ==
Professional ratings
Review scores
Source	Rating
AllMusic	4/5 stars
Clash	8/10
Exclaim!	8/10
The Guardian	3/5 stars
Pitchfork	6.6/10
PopMatters	8/10

The Guardian gave the album three stars, calling it "a lovingly kitsch collaboration" and that the album "might easily have been a loathsomely ironic exercise." stating that the track "Mr. Frosty" made the album "worth owning". The review concluded that "much of the rest is indulgent piffle." AllMusic gave the album four stars, while noting that the mixed styles of James and Paradinas "cancels out the particular attractions of both artists, and the listener is left with a somewhat bland album. Fans of Aphex and μ-Ziq will be excited, but newcomers should go elsewhere before they dig this deep." In retrospective reviews, Pitchfork described it as "just a playful, occasionally inspired time capsule of the 1990s."

== Track listing ==
1996 release
No.	Title	Length
1.	"Mr. Frosty"	6:51
2.	"Jelly Fish"	6:30
3.	"Eggy Toast"	4:07
4.	"Reg"	5:57
5.	"Vodka"	4:12
6.	"Winner Takes All"	5:44
7.	"Giant Deflating Football"	6:22
8.	"Upright Kangaroo"	3:31
9.	"The Sound of the Beady Eyes"	7:46
10.	"Bu Bu Bu Ba"	6:51

=== 2016 CD reissue ===
Disc one
No.	Title	Length
1.	"Mr. Frosty"	6:53
2.	"Reg"	5:56
3.	"Jelly Fish"	6:01
4.	"Eggy Toast"	4:32
5.	"Vodka"	4:12
6.	"Winner Takes All"	5:44
7.	"Upright Kangaroo"	3:32
8.	"Giant Deflating Football"	6:21
9.	"The Sound of the Beady Eyes"	7:46
10.	"Bu Bu Bu Ba"	6:52

Disc two
No.	Title	Length
11.	"Vodka" (Mix 2)	4:22
12.	"Portamento Gosh"	2:02
13.	"Waltz"	5:24
14.	"Brivert & Muonds"	6:17
15.	"Clissold Bathroom"	0:54
16.	"Jelly Fish" (Mix 2)	5:21
17.	"Organ Plodder"	4:15

Digital exclusive track
No.	Title	Length
18.	"Upright Kangaroo" (Mix 2)	4:33

== Personnel ==
Adapted from the Expert Knob Twiddlers liner notes:

- Performers [Everything By] – Michael Paradinas, Richard James
- Cover – Johnny Clayton, Richard James

== Footnotes ==
=== References ===
- Buckley, Peter, ed. (2003). The Rough Guide to Rock. Rough Guides. ISBN 1843531054.
