= Mighty Force Records =

UK record label and shop

Mighty Force Records was a record shop and techno label based in Exeter, Devon, South West England. It was founded by ex-punk, free festival activist (having briefly worked with the Stonehenge Free Festival Campaign in 1983) and warehouse party organiser Mark Darby and his partner, journalist Jess Shortis, after they had visited visiting various club-based events in Plymouth and realised there was no focal point for the burgeoning rave scene in Somerset, Devon and Cornwall.

The store soon became a regular stop-off point for many internationally known DJs including, Sasha, Andrew Weatherall, Lee Burridge, Jon DaSilva and Felix Buxton later of Basement Jaxx and was the catalyst for the fledgling West Country techno movement.

The record label is best known for releasing Analogue Bubblebath by the Aphex Twin, and works of Tom Middleton later of Global Communication, Jedi Knights, Cosmos and AMBA. Later releases included Middleton's own "My Splendid Idea" and the hard to find Fog City EP by Darby and Matthew Herbert.

Middleton, his Global Communication and Jedi Knights partner Mark Pritchard and Herbert met through the patronage of the Mighty Force store. All three also DJ'ed regularly at the weekly promotional club night run by the label along with the likes of Weatherall, Judge Jules and ex-Haçienda resident Graeme Park. Another regular DJ at these events was Dominic Jacobson then studying at Exeter University, later a member of Phil Asher's Restless Soul crew and who now produces deep jazz inflected house under the name Modaji and Harvey Lindo. Middleton and Jacobson were often to be seen working behind the shop counter.

Although the store ceased to trade in 1995, the label relocated to London and continued to release music by deep house artists such as Peach Palf and the Classic / Music For Freaks recording artists, Luke Solomon and Justin Harris under the alias Robotic Movement until 1998. Label design was by Ben Drury, known for his innovative work with James Lavelle's Mo' Wax label and collaborations with former graffiti artist and The Clash's sometime sleeve designer, Futura 2000.

Other releases included a series of white label breakbeat EPs under the name of Old Skool Flava, nominally produced by Darby and "H" Warren, label manager of Global Communication's now defunct Universal Language Productions imprint.

Darby's connections with the early 1980s festival scene and involvement in organising free acid house parties led to an informal partnership between a DJ and sound system collective based around the shop and Nottingham's DiY Sound System, with whom they collaborated to stage free parties throughout the South West during the early to mid 1990s.

== See also ==
- Lists of record labels
