= Ventolin (EP) =

EP / Single by Aphex Twin
- Released: 27 March 1995
- Genres: Industrial hip hop; noise; IDM
- Length: 26:27
- Label: Warp
- Producer: Aphex Twin

Richard D. James chronology
Classics (1995)	Ventolin (1995)	...I Care Because You Do (1995)

Professional ratings
Review scores
Source	Rating
AllMusic	2/5 stars

"Ventolin" is a 1995 EP by the electronic music artist and producer Aphex Twin. It is noted for its harsh, abrasive sound. James recorded numerous versions of the piece. The record entered the Dance Singles Chart at number 15 in April 1995.

The piece is named after a trade name for the drug salbutamol, which is prescribed for the treatment of asthma. A reported side effect of this drug is tinnitus, a high-pitched ringing in the ears. James utilised this effect in "Ventolin", incorporating a piercing high-pitched ringing sound throughout the track. The music also incorporates heavily distorted techno beats. The resulting effect has been cited as "one of the harshest singles ever recorded".

The song is sampled by the Vancouver industrial band Front Line Assembly in the song "Retribution" on their 1999 album Implode.

== Album/video version ==
The first recording of "Ventolin" (the "video version") appeared on a music video produced to accompany the track. The video consists of a woman being trapped in an elevator with other industrial images interspersed. The "video version" of the track was released a month later on the 1995 Aphex Twin album ...I Care Because You Do.

== Single releases ==
In 1995 Warp Records released "Ventolin" as a single in the United Kingdom, on 12-inch vinyl and CD in two parts, Ventolin and Ventolin Remixes. Between them, these EPs have a further 12 tracks, ostensibly versions of "Ventolin". The record entered the Dance Singles Chart at number 15 on 8 April 1995.

Designed by Dan Parkes (who also designed the artwork for On), the single's artwork has Renaissance-style anatomical drawings of a human head and upper torso, together with an asthma inhaler and the Aphex Twin logo.

== Notes on the various "remixes" ==
Whilst all twelve versions of "Ventolin" on these singles are labelled as ostensible remixes, in many cases they appear to be almost entirely new pieces of music, bearing only nominal relation to the original. The "Wheeze" mix is the only remix that utilises the high-pitched ringing and sounds from the original "Ventolin".

- The "Salbutamol Mix" is an extended version of the "video version".
- Several of the apparently bizarre remix names are actually Cornish place names: Praze-An-Beeble, Marazanvose, Carharrack and Probus are all Cornish villages. There is a Coppice Inn in the village of Lanner, near Redruth. Plain-An-Gwarry is an area within Redruth and also the generic name for a Cornish medieval amphitheatre used for the performance of mystery plays and sports.
- Other mix names refer to the medicinal Ventolin: "asthma beats", "wheeze" (a symptom of asthma) and Salbutamol.
- The "Praze-An-Beeble mix" ends with manipulated samples of James' mother Lorna laughing, whilst the "Marazanvose mix" ends with a child counting in Afrikaans mixed with manipulated animal sounds.
- "Crowsmengegus mix" closes with a speech synthesizer (MacinTalk "Whisper") intoning an MC's toast to a list of names ("Respect going out to..."), almost all of whom were collaborators with James. This was later issued as a separate track on 51/13 Aphex Singles Collection, named "Respect List".
- The "Plain-An-Gwarry Mix" was partly used in the making of the song "Cow Cud Is a Twin" from the …I Care Because You Do album. They have very similar drum beats and similar infrequent bass lines.

== Track listing ==
All tracks are written by Richard David James unless noted.

Ventolin
No.	Title	Length
1.	"Ventolin" (Salbutamol Mix)	5:46
2.	"Ventolin" (Praze-An-Beeble Mix)	3:21
3.	"Ventolin" (Marazanvose Mix)	2:10
4.	"Ventolin" (Plain-An-Gwarry Mix)	4:37
5.	"Ventolin" (The Coppice Mix)	4:35
6.	"Ventolin" (Crowsmengegus Mix)	5:52
Total length:		26:27

2017 re-release digital bonus tracks
No.	Title	Length
7.	"hilow [ru,ec,+3]"	2:55
8.	"ventolin1 un e,ru,ec+2"	1:21
Total length:		30:43

Ventolin Remixes
No.	Title	Remix by	Length
1.	"Ventolin" (Wheeze Mix)		7:07
2.	"Ventolin" (Carharrack Mix)		2:49
3.	"Ventolin" (Probus Mix)		4:14
4.	"Ventolin" (Cylob Mix)	Cylob	5:02
5.	"Ventolin" (Deep Gong Mix)	Luke Vibert	6:18
6.	"Ventolin" (Asthma Beats Mix)		1:39
Total length:			27:09
