= Cheetah (EP) =

EP by Aphex Twin
- Released: 8 July 2016
- Genres: Techno; IDM; acid techno
- Length: 33:49
- Label: Warp
- Producer: Richard D James

Aphex Twin chronology
Orphaned Deejay Selek 2006–08 (2015)	Cheetah (2016)	Collapse EP (2018)

Singles from Cheetah
- 1. "CIRKLON3 [Колхозная mix]" Released: 21 June 2016; 2. "CHEETAHT7b" Released: 1 July 2016

Cheetah is an extended play record by the electronic music artist and producer Aphex Twin. It was released on 8 July 2016 on Warp. The name is a reference to Cheetah Marketing, a British manufacturer of microcomputer peripherals and electronic musical instruments in the 1980s (such as the MS800 namechecked in two of the EP's track titles).

== Release ==
In 2015 Richard D. James uploaded several tracks with names like "Cheetah3 Teac" and "CHEETAHT7" to his SoundCloud 'user18081971' account; these have since been removed.

A flyer teasing the EP release was sent to various record shops in the UK in early June 2016. The flyer parodies the luxurious writing style of 1970s adverts. The album was announced on 9 June, with James tweeting a link to a website for the EP.

The Cheetah EP was made available on vinyl, CD, cassette and a digital download in various digital formats, including MP3, WAV and FLAC.

A video for "CIRKLON3 [Колхозная mix]" was released on 21 June. The video was James' first since the Chris Cunningham-directed video for "Windowlicker" in 1999 and was directed by 12-year-old Ryan Wyer. James and Warp commissioned Wyer to direct the video after James discovered Wyer's "Ryan Wyer" YouTube channel.

== Reception ==
Professional ratings
Aggregate scores
Source	Rating
Metacritic	74/100
Review scores
Source	Rating
AllMusic	3/5 stars
Consequence of Sound	B
Exclaim!	6/10
Louder than War	8/10
NME	3/5 stars
Pitchfork	8.2/10
PopMatters	8/10
Release Magazine	6/10
Spin	7/10
Tom Hull - on the Web	B+

At Metacritic, which assigns a normalised rating out of 100 to reviews from mainstream critics, Cheetah received an average score of 74, based on 11 reviews. Writing for Exclaim!, Daryl Keating gave the album muted praise, calling it "fine but unremarkable, especially when pitted against the behemoths of his back catalogue".

=== Accolades ===
Accolades for Cheetah
Publication	Accolade	Year	Rank	Ref.
Pitchfork	The 20 Best Electronic Albums of 2016	2016	—N/a	

== Track listing ==
All tracks were written & produced by Richard D. James.

Cheetah track listing
No.	Title	Length
1.	"CHEETAHT2 [Ld spectrum]"	5:53
2.	"CHEETAHT7b"	6:43
3.	"CHEETA1b ms800"	0:27
4.	"CHEETA2 ms800"	0:37
5.	"CIRKLON3 [Колхозная mix]"	8:13
6.	"CIRKLON 1"	7:17
7.	"2X202-ST5"	4:39
Total length:		33:49

aphextwin.warp.net 2018 bonus track
No.	Title	Length
8.	"CIRKLON3 (concentrate edit)"	2:37
Total length:		36:26

- "2X202-ST5" is contained on the CD, cassette and digital download editions and is included as a download available with the vinyl editions.

== Personnel ==
Credits adapted from Cheetah liner notes

- Richard D. James – producer, writer
- Beau Thomas – mastering
- The Designers Republic – artwork

== Charts ==
Chart performance for Cheetah
Chart (2016)	Peak position
Australian Albums (ARIA)	63
Irish Albums (IRMA)	48
Italian Albums (FIMI)	97
New Zealand Heatseeker Albums (RMNZ)	5
Scottish Albums (Official Charts)	11
Swiss Albums (Schweizer Hitparade)	63
UK Albums (Official Charts)	14
US Billboard 200	140
US Top Dance Albums (Billboard)	1
