= Computer Controlled Acoustic Instruments pt2 =

EP by Aphex Twin
- Released: 23 January 2015
- Genres: Breakbeat; avant-garde jazz
- Length: 27:56
- Label: Warp
- Producer: Richard D James

Aphex Twin chronology
| Syro (2014) | Computer Controlled Acoustic Instruments pt2 (2015) | Orphaned Deejay Selek 2006–08 (2015) |

Computer Controlled Acoustic Instruments pt2 is an extended play record by the British electronic music artist and producer Aphex Twin. It was released on 23 January 2015 on Warp. It is meant as a companion piece to his fifth studio album, Drukqs (2001).

It received mixed reviews and placed in several international record charts, including the United States Billboard Dance/Electronic Albums chart, where it peaked at number one.

== Background ==
Computer Controlled Acoustic Instruments pt.2 features acoustic sounds such as prepared piano, drums, and wood and metal percussion, controlled electronically. James considers it the successor to his 2001 album Drukqs:

Part 1 is Drukqs, as that was the first thing I released that utilised computer controlled instruments, namely a modified Yamaha Disklavier, 2nd gen and a couple of midi controlled solenoid based drum mechanisms I made just after I got the Disklavier.

The EP extends the ideas of its predecessor, according to Mark Richardson of Pitchfork, who noted that "where James used to offer his electro-acoustic pieces as a showcase for lyrical melodies, about half the music here consists of crisply arranged beats, with loping drum lines that occasionally veer toward funk". Much of the album features breakbeat backing. Exclaim! stated that most tracks "fall under the label of avant-garde jazz — some of it experimental and way out there — while other parts are coherent enough to sneak into the darker corners of Ninja Tune's back catalogue."

== Release ==
Computer Controlled Acoustic Instruments pt2 was announced for release on 9 January 2015 on Warp's official website. The track listing, worldwide release date and a list of available release formats were published on Bleep.com alongside pre-orders of the EP. Released worldwide on 23 January, Computer Controlled Acoustic Instruments pt2 was made available as a 12-inch record pressed on 140-gram vinyl, a Digipak CD and a digital download in various digital formats, including MP3, WAV and FLAC. An alternative mix of the EP's opening track—"Diskhat ALL Prepared1mixed [snr2mix]"—was made available for stream and MP3 download on Richard D James' official SoundCloud account a day prior.

In Japan, Computer Controlled Acoustic Instruments pt2 was released on Beat Records and sold 3,627 physical copies in its first week of release. The EP was particularly successful on the independent charts in Ireland and the United Kingdom; it peaked at number 8 on both the Irish Independent Albums Chart and the UK Independent Albums Chart, as well as entering at number 7 on the UK Official Record Store Albums Chart, where it peaked at number 4 in its third week of release. Computer Controlled Acoustic Instruments pt2 placed in three separate Billboard charts in the US. It fared well on the Dance/Electronic Albums chart, entering at number 4 in its first week of release and peaking at number 1 the following week; the EP also entered the Tastemakers Albums chart at number 24 and placed at number 10 in its second week.

== Reception ==
Professional ratings
Aggregate scores
| Source | Rating |
|---|---|
| Metacritic | 64/100 |
Review scores
| Source | Rating |
| AllMusic | 2/5 stars |
| Clash | 7/10 |
| Drowned in Sound | 8/10 |
| Exclaim! | 6/10 |
| Fact | 2/5 discs |
| The Guardian | 2/5 stars |
| NME | 6/10 |
| Pitchfork | 8.3/10 |
| Resident Advisor | 3.3/5 |
| Spin | 7/10 |

At Metacritic, which assigns a normalised rating out of 100 to reviews from mainstream critics, Computer Controlled Acoustic Instruments pt2 received an average score of 64, based on 17 reviews, indicating "generally favorable reviews".

Felicity Martin of Clash called the EP "a difficult but enriching document [that is] compiled of often-jarring, disjointed instruments," noting the "really interesting part of this extended play—it's not about making the robots feel human, but feeling as though you're in the room with them, whirring about around you." In his review for the NME Louis Pattison referred to the EP as "true, manufactured pop music" due to the instrumentation being "played not by human hands, but by signals zipping around circuit boards." He added that "as a challenge—to his audience, and to himself [...] it succeeds admirably.". For Drowned in Sound, Benjamin Bland referred to the EP as "a welcome reminder of James's ability to utilise decidedly avant-garde ideas in a manner that, although acutely alien to our idea of musical normality, is nevertheless engaging and inspiring." Bland also regarded the EP as "highly listenable, no less so than Syro". Pitchfork writer Mark Richardson praised the EP but called it "a release for established fans."

Exclaim! writer Daryl Keating offered a mixed review, describing the EP as "the compositional scribblings of a sleepless man". Resident Advisor's Jordan Rothlein's review described the EP as "a moody set that sounds a bit like either Tom Waits instrumentals, a gamelan ensemble going pop, or maybe just some bits from Syro played back at a fraction of their original speed." Rothelin added that "though there's a certain pleasure in listening to an artist figure things out, a full 28 minutes feels like overkill." Writing for The Guardian, Ben Beaumont-Thomas was highly critical of the EP, saying that "if Syro was an inquisitive artificial intelligence ... then [this EP] is like the organic consciousness it was drawn from, its owner now tinkering with jigsaws in a retirement home." AllMusic was almost entirely negative; reviewer Andy Kellman wrote that "nothing is particularly energizing ... the EP should be approached like a sequel—with low expectations."

== Track listing ==
All tracks are written by Richard D James.

Computer Controlled Acoustic Instruments pt2 track listing
| No. | Title | Length |
|---|---|---|
| 1. | "diskhat ALL prepared1mixed 13" | 5:22 |
| 2. | "snar2" | 0:20 |
| 3. | "diskhat1" | 2:26 |
| 4. | "piano un1 arpej" | 0:50 |
| 5. | "DISKPREPT4" | 1:53 |
| 6. | "hat 2b 2012b" | 1:25 |
| 7. | "disk aud1_12" | 0:10 |
| 8. | "0035 1-Audio" | 0:26 |
| 9. | "disk prep calrec2 barn dance [slo]" | 4:22 |
| 10. | "DISKPREPT1" | 3:30 |
| 11. | "diskhat2" | 0:38 |
| 12. | "piano un10 it happened" | 1:48 |
| 13. | "hat5c 0001 rec-4" | 4:46 |
| Total length: | | 27:56 |

The track length above is valid for CD, digital download and vinyl played on 33 rpm.

2017 re-release bonus tracks
| No. | Title | Length |
|---|---|---|
| 14. | "diskhat ALL prepared1mixed [snr2mix]diskhat ALL prepared1bmixed [snr2mix],e,ru,+4" | 5:22 |
| 15. | "diskhat ALL [snr2mix] [fast],e,+3" | 4:52 |
| 16. | "DISKLVPRPT1 Equinox barn dance[fast]" | 2:20 |
| Total length: | | 40:30 |

== Personnel ==
All personnel credits adapted from Computer Controlled Acoustic Instruments pt2's album notes.

Performer

- Richard D James – keyboards, percussion, programming, production

Technical personnel

- Beau Thomas – mastering

Design personnel

- The Designers Republic (credited as "MITDR™") – design, cover art
- Atsushi Sasaki – liner notes (Japanese CD edition only)

== Chart positions ==
Chart performance for Computer Controlled Acoustic Instruments pt2
| Chart (2015) | Peak position |
|---|---|
| Belgian Albums Chart (Flanders) | 80 |
| Belgian Albums Chart (Wallonia) | 166 |
| Irish Albums Chart | 32 |
| Irish Independent Albums Chart | 8 |
| Japanese Albums Chart | 24 |
| UK Albums Chart | 36 |
| UK Independent Albums Chart | 8 |
| UK Official Record Store Albums Chart | 4 |
| US Billboard Dance/Electronic Albums | 1 |
| US Billboard Independent Albums | 24 |
| US Billboard Tastemaker Albums | 10 |

== Release history ==
Release history and formats for Computer Controlled Acoustic Instruments pt2
| Region | Date | Format(s) | Label | Catalogue |
|---|---|---|---|---|
| Various | 23 January 2015 | 12-inch, CD, digital download | Warp | WAP375 |
| Japan | 23 January 2015 | CD, digital download | Beat | BRE-50 |
