= Come to Daddy (song) =

Single by Aphex Twin

from the EP Come to Daddy
- A-side: "Come to Daddy" (Pappy Mix); "Flim"
- B-side: "Bucephalus Bouncing Ball"; "Come to Daddy" (Little Lord Fauntleroy Mix)
- Released: 6 October 1997
- Genre: Drill 'n' bass; breakbeat; drum and bass; noise
- Length: 4:21 (Pappy Mix); 3:50 (Little Lord Fauntleroy Mix)
- Label: Warp
- Songwriter: Richard D. James
- Producer: Richard D. James

Aphex Twin singles chronology
"Girl/Boy" (1996)	"Come to Daddy" (1997)	"Windowlicker" (1999)

Music video
- "Come to Daddy" on YouTube

"Come to Daddy" is a track by the British electronic music producer Richard D. James, released under his main pseudonym Aphex Twin. It was released as a single through Warp Records on 6 October 1997, coinciding with the lengthier extended play release of the same name. A music video for the song was released, which ranked at number one on Pitchfork's Top 50 Music Videos of 1990s list.

NME made the song Single of the Week, and in October 2011 placed the song at number 42 on its "150 Best Tracks of the Past 15 Years" list. The song peaked at number 10 on the Danish Singles Chart and number 36 on the UK Singles Chart.

== Background ==
James noted his thoughts on the song in a 2001 interview with Index Magazine, notably being uninterested in its popularity.

"'Come to Daddy' came about while I was just hanging around my house, getting pissed and doing this crappy death metal jingle. Then it got marketed and a video was made, and this little idea that I had, which was a joke, turned into something huge. It wasn't right at all."

After its successful release, James claimed that he removed the record from circulation for one week, hoping to prevent it from reaching number one; it peaked at 36.

"Come to Daddy" has been interpreted as a parody of the Prodigy's hit single "Firestarter".

== Music video ==
The music video for "Come to Daddy" (released in October 1997) was directed by Chris Cunningham and filmed on the Thamesmead council estate, which is also where Stanley Kubrick shot a lot of the scenes in A Clockwork Orange. The scene is shot around Tavy Bridge Shopping centre, which was demolished in 2007. Much of the dark underground car parking is now gone.

=== Description ===
The video opens with an old woman (played by Coral Lorne) walking a dog in a grimy, industrial setting. The dog urinates on an abandoned television lying on the pavement, causing it to sputter unexpectedly into life, and a distorted and warping headshot of Richard D. James chants the lyrics. This unleashes a spirit, accompanied by a gang of small children, all of whom bear James' grinning face and who appear to inhabit the abandoned buildings. The children go around wreaking havoc, trashing an alley and chasing a man into his car. The thin man (played by Al Stokes) emerges from the television, screams in the woman's face, then gathers the children around him.

=== Distinctions and awards ===
The video is included on the Directors Label volume, The Work of Director Chris Cunningham. The video was also named the number one video of the 1990s by Pitchfork. The video won the Golden Nica (main award) in the Digital Musics category at the Prix Ars Electronica in 1999.

== The Dillinger Escape Plan version ==
The Dillinger Escape Plan covered Come to Daddy on their 2002 EP Irony is a Dead Scene with Mike Patton on vocals.

== Use in media ==
"Come to Daddy" was used in the television series Master of None in a scene where Aziz Ansari's character Dev imagines himself as a parent to two bratty children. The song was also used at the end of the Joel Schumacher film 8mm. Earlier in the film, the music video is seen playing in the background on a television set. The song (and/or album) is mentioned in Frank Ocean's 2017 single "Provider" following the line "Stiff smile just like I'm Aphex Twin".

The song was also featured in 2005 racing game Project Gotham Racing 3 as well as being featured in 2008 racing game MotorStorm: Pacific Rift and in the video CKY2K.

Christian Bale cited the "Come to Daddy" music video as an inspiration for his portrayal of Gorr the God Butcher in Thor: Love and Thunder (2022).

== Track listing ==
- Warp – WAP94

Side A
No.	Title	Length
1.	"Come to Daddy" (Pappy Mix)	4:21
2.	"Flim"	2:57

Side B
No.	Title	Length
1.	"Bucephalus Bouncing Ball"	5:45
2.	"Come to Daddy" (Little Lord Faulteroy Mix)	3:50

== Charts ==
Chart (1997)	Peak position
Denmark (Tracklisten)	10
UK Singles (Official Charts)	36
UK Dance (Official Charts)	5
UK Indie (Official Charts)	9
