= Polynomial-C =

Song by Aphex Twin

from the EP Xylem Tube EP
- Released: 1 June 1992
- Genre: IDM, Acid techno
- Length: 4:46
- Label: R&S
- Songwriter: Richard D. James (Aphex Twin)
- Producer: Richard D. James

"Polynomial-C" is a song by English IDM artist Aphex Twin.

It has been stated to have "a captivating melody in haste that is punctuated frequently, which is soaked in simplistic harmonic goodness and feels otherworldly"

The song debuted and peaked at No. 39 upon its reissue in 2025.

It is featured on the compilation album Classics.

== Charts ==
Chart (2025)	Peak position
UK Indie Singles (MRIB)	53
