= Collapse EP =

EP by Aphex Twin
- Released: 14 September 2018
- Genre: Electronic; footwork; jungle; techno
- Length: 28:52
- Label: Warp
- Producer: Richard D. James

Aphex Twin chronology
Cheetah (2016)	Collapse EP (2018)	Blackbox Life Recorder 21f / in a room7 F760 (2023)

Singles from Collapse EP
- 1. "T69 Collapse" Released: 7 August 2018

Collapse EP is an EP by the British electronic music artist Richard D. James under the pseudonym Aphex Twin. It was released on 14 September 2018 on Warp. The record received universal acclaim from music critics, who praised James for returning to his signature "Aphex Twin" sound.

== Release ==
In late July 2018 stylised Aphex Twin logo posters appeared in London's Elephant and Castle station. By August, the same logo was found in various cities, such as Los Angeles, New York City, and Tokyo. At the same time, a since-removed Amazon listing for Collapse stated the release date to be 14 September 2018.

On 5 August 2018 Warp Records issued a press release via Twitter; an image of a document digitally obscured with the same Aphex Twin logo found days earlier. When edited, the document contained nonsensical, rambling sentences, such as "Y'wd Aphex Twin The legendary summer for this summer of love! love epoch, global phenomlomenamental", including words written in Cornish, similar to track titles from James' 2001 album Drukqs.

On 7 August 2018 Adult Swim was scheduled to broadcast a track from Collapse, but ultimately cancelled as the track's music video failed the Harding test. The music video for "T69 collapse" was released later that day through the Aphex Twin YouTube channel, with Warp Records stating the music video, as well as the metropolitan logo posters, were created by London-based video designer Weirdcore. Weirdcore told Fast Company's DJ Pangburn that to make the "T69 Collapse" video, he processed collaged 3D scans of Cornwall using Transfusion.AI, an After Effects plugin with machine learning algorithms that recompose images or video based on another media's style. Pre-orders for vinyl, CD and cassette copies of Collapse were made available on this day via the Aphex Twin store page, and online store Bleep. The music was leaked on the internet on 13 August 2018.

== Critical reception ==
Professional ratings
Aggregate scores
Source	Rating
Metacritic	82/100
Review scores
Source	Rating
AllMusic	4/5 stars
Consequence of Sound	A−
Drowned in Sound	8/10
Exclaim!	8/10
The Line of Best Fit	8/10
NME	4/5 stars
Pitchfork	8.1/10
PopMatters	8/10
Resident Advisor	4/5 stars
Slant Magazine	3.5/5 stars

Collapse was met with universal acclaim from music critics. At Metacritic, which assigns a normalised rating out of 100 reviews from mainstream critics, the extended play received an average score of 82, based on 15 reviews. Most critics noted the release for incorporating trademark Aphex Twin sounds similar to his previous releases. Paul Simpson from AllMusic lauded the "ironically titled" record which showcases a return to Aphex Twin's signature "ultra-glitchy beats and childlike melodies", contrary to Robert Ham from Consequence of Sound who was less impressed with the familiarity and lack of surprise and shock in the songs. Alternatively, he praised the element of control within the tracks which came to "recognizable signatures at the center of the entropic sound that seems to be coming apart in real time."

The individual tracks on Collapse were received positively by critics, with Daryl Keating of Exclaim! labelling the songs as "absolute gems" and Carlos Hawthorn from Resident Advisor feeling that each track had "moments abstract enough to grab your attention and human enough to keep it." Writing for NME, Tom Connick described the record as "music for Mad Max's post-apocalyptic parties [...] a mad-hatter's box of tricks, blown up and reconstructed" and called it Aphex Twin's "most essential" release in years. Slant Magazine's Josh Geller was surprised with how "warm and inviting" Collapse sounds, whose "dense bursts of intricate glitch to expansive, ambient soundscapes" makes it feel like a "more elaborate musical journey than its mere five tracks."

Critics also compared the record to Aphex Twin's 2014 album, Syro: Andy Cush from Spin found Collapse matching closely to the ambition and structural shifts found in the album, while Spyros Statis of PopMatters wrote that the record "interchanges the Syro sound with a range of dissonant ideas and disfigured rhythmic patterns." Cush later acknowledged that Collapse is more willing to "follow those shifts to even more hazardous locales"; most songs start at "relative normalcy" before moving "growing out of control" and breaking down. The Line of Best Fit's Jack Bray instead compared Collapse to Aphex Twin's Cheetah EP, feeling that Collapse was a more confident release than the latter despite lasting for a shorter period. He particularly praised the musical arrangement on the record, which he observed was "packed with ideas" and "represents some of the finest and most varied to be found across any of [Aphex Twin's] projects". Pitchfork's Philip Sherburne saw that unlike Aphex Twin's previous releases, the music on Collapse "moves on a wider scale" with a "real sense of violence", but manages to stay "relatively unscathed" due to Twin's mastery of "juggling precision and chaos".

== Track listing ==
Collapse EP track listing
No.	Title	Length
1.	"T69 Collapse"	5:22
2.	"1st 44"	6:09
3.	"MT1 t29r2"	6:04
4.	"abundance10edit[2 R8's, FZ20m & a 909]"	6:20
5.	"pthex (Note: "pthex" does not appear on the vinyl version of Collapse.)"	4:57
Total length:		28:52

aphextwin.warp.net exclusive track
No.	Title	Length
6.	"t69 collapse [durichroma]"	6:39
Total length:		35:31

== Charts ==
Chart performance for Collapse EP
Chart (2018)	Peak position
Japanese Albums (Oricon)	28
Scottish Albums (OCC)	7
Swiss Albums (Schweizer Hitparade)	88
UK Albums (OCC)	11
UK Dance Albums (OCC)	4
US Billboard 200	113
US Top Dance Albums (Billboard)	2
