= GAK (EP) =

EP by GAK
- Released: 6 June 1994
- Genre: Electronic music
- Length: 24:11
- Label: Warp
- Producer: Richard D. James

Richard D. James chronology
| Selected Ambient Works Volume II (1994) | GAK (1994) | Analogue Bubblebath 4 (1994) |

Professional ratings
Review scores
| Source | Rating |
|---|---|
| Allmusic | 1.5/5 stars |

GAK is an extended play by the British electronic music artist Richard D. James, also known as Aphex Twin. It was released in 1994 under the pseudonym "GAK", which was used only for this release. The record is sourced from demos Richard D. James sent to Warp Records in 1990 prior to his signing. The album is rumored to be an imitation of the classic Warp artist LFO. James recorded the songs possibly around 1989–1990.

GAK 1 is an example of early techno, mainly structured around a repetitive CR-78 pattern with a piano melody. GAK 2 is similar but has a more ambient techno sound than any other tracks on the EP. GAK 3, however is a much darker, track with racing synths and a hard 4–4 beat, one of James' attempts to create a more rave type of sound. This album was released both in CD, digital and 12" formats. The cover artwork features GAK written on the top and the Warp logo at the bottom on a purple background. The cover artwork is by The Designers Republic. On the official Aphex Twin website, there are 5 bonus tracks added, which were previously included in James' free SoundCloud releases, and were played live at his shows occasionally.

== Track listing ==
Original release
| No. | Title | Length |
|---|---|---|
| 1. | "GAK 1" | 6:36 |
| 2. | "GAK 2" | 6:10 |
| 3. | "GAK 3" | 5:23 |
| 4. | "GAK 4" | 6:02 |

2017 aphextwin.warp.net bonus tracks
| No. | Title | Length |
|---|---|---|
| 5. | "gak police er,2" | 4:28 |
| 6. | "gak bass, e, +2" | 3:29 |
| 7. | "gak5 e, +3" | 1:37 |
| 8. | "gak6 e, +3" | 5:25 |
| 9. | "gak7 e, +3" | 6:00 |
