= Drill 'n' bass =

Subgenre of electronic music

- Other names: Fungle, spunk jazz
- Stylistic origins: IDM; breakbeat; jungle; drum and bass; techno
- Cultural origins: Mid-1990s, United Kingdom
- Derivative forms: Breakcore

Drill 'n' bass is a subgenre of drum and bass which developed in the mid-1990s as IDM artists began experimenting with elements of jungle and breakbeat music. Artists utilized powerful audio software to program frenzied, irregular beats that often discouraged dancing. The style was often interpreted as having a lightly parodic relationship with the dance styles that inspired it.

== Characteristics ==
AllMusic referred to the genre as "a spastic form of breakbeat jungle that relied on powerful audio software and patient programming to warp old midtempo beats and breaks into a frenzied, experimental potpourri of low-attention-span electronic music." Critic Simon Reynolds described it as "jungle by non-junglists for non-junglists," stating that producers are "free to take the idiomatic features of jungle — fucked-up breakbeats, mutant bass, sampladelic collage —and exacerbate them away beyond any conceivable use-value to DJ or dancer." Author Peter Shapiro called it "double-time drum 'n' bass with impossible-to-dance-to rhythms and toilet humor."

== History ==
Early exponents of drill 'n' bass included Luke Vibert, Aphex Twin, and Squarepusher. The style was pioneered by Vibert on his 1995 EPs under the name Plug, beginning with Plug 1: Visible Crater Funk. Other pioneering releases included Aphex Twin's Hangable Auto Bulb EPs (1995) (under his AFX moniker) and Squarepusher's Conumber E:P (1995). In 1996, the style appeared on long-form LPs such as Squarepusher's Feed Me Weird Things. Aphex Twin continued working in the style on his projects Richard D. James Album (1996), Come to Daddy (1997), and Drukqs (2001). The μ-Ziq album Lunatic Harness (1997) was described by The Quietus as an "immaculate example" of the style.

Subsequent artists like Witchman, Animals on Wheels, Amon Tobin, Mung, and Plasmalamp also explored the style. By the end of the 1990s, it had largely dissipated. Later artists such as Kid606 drew on the style. It would help produce the IDM spin-off genre breakcore, which took a more earnest and frenetic approach to the jungle sound.

== See also ==
- Intelligent dance music
- Jungle
- Drum and bass
- Glitch (music)
