= Surfing on Sine Waves =

Studio album by Polygon Window
- Released: 11 January 1993
- Studio: Llannerlog Studios, Cornwall
- Genre: Acid techno; ambient techno; IDM
- Length: 49:02 (Standard); 74:54 (Expanded Edition)
- Label: Warp
- Producer: Richard D. James

Richard D. James chronology
Analogue Bubblebath Vol 3 (1992)	Surfing on Sine Waves (1993)	Quoth (1993)

Artificial Intelligence series chronology
Artificial Intelligence (1992)	Surfing on Sine Waves (1993)	Bytes (1993)

Surfing on Sine Waves is a studio album by the British musician and producer Richard D. James under the alias Polygon Window. The record was released on 11 January 1993 through Warp Records. It entered the Dance Albums Chart at No. 2 on 23 January 1993. James' previous album, Selected Ambient Works 85‍–‍92, was then at No. 9 on the chart, and James briefly had two records in the Dance Albums Top 10 under different pseudonyms. The 2001 reissue edition includes the previously unreleased tracks "Portreath Harbour" and "Redruth School".

== Background ==
The cover of the album features a photograph of Chapel Porth beach in Cornwall, where James spent time with his sisters as a child; James thanks the seaside village in the liner notes. The title Surfing on Sine Waves was chosen by Warp founder Rob Mitchell after James mentioned that "loads of people I knew growing up in Cornwall were poser surfers and I didn't wanna hang around with them." The record is the second release in Warp's Artificial Intelligence series.

== Reissues ==
In 2000, the album was reissued with two extra tracks placed before "Quino - phec"; "Redruth School", which shares the name of James' alma mater and "Portreath Harbour". In August 2025, an extended edition further added the tracks "Iketa", "Quoth (Wooden Thump Mix)" and "Bike Pump Meets Bucket" from Quoth.

== Reception ==
Professional ratings
Review scores
Source	Rating
AllMusic	4.5/5 stars
Pitchfork	8.1/10
The Rolling Stone Album Guide	3/5 stars
Select	5/5
Spin Alternative Record Guide	7/10

Ned Raggett of AllMusic praised Surfing on Sine Waves as "a great collection of abstract electronic/dance madness, caught somewhere between the driftiness of his more ambient works at the time and the rave-minded nuttiness of Digeridoo." Mark Richard-San of Pitchfork wrote, "Catchy, melodic and memorable tracks are what made the Aphex Twin so wonderful at his best; Surfing on Sine Waves has a handful of these, albeit in rough, embryonic form." By September 1993, the record had sold 50,000 copies.

In 2012, Fact placed Surfing on Sine Waves at number 26 on its list of the "100 Best Albums of the 1990s". In 2017, Pitchfork placed it at number 26 on its list of the "50 Best IDM Albums of All Time". Writing for Pitchfork, Andrew Nosnitsky said, "These days, Surfing doesn't get mentioned as often as the louder, more ambitious, 'proper' Aphex records that would follow, but it's easily as refined on a technical level—and maybe even more emotionally rewarding."

== Track listing ==
All tracks are written by Richard D. James.

1993 original edition
No.	Title	Length
1.	"Polygon Window"	5:24
2.	"Audax Powder"	4:36
3.	"Quoth"	5:34
4.	"If It Really Is Me"	7:01
5.	"Supremacy II"	4:04
6.	"UT1 – dot"	5:17
7.	"Untitled"	6:24
8.	"Quixote"	6:00
9.	"Quino – phec"	4:42
Total length:		49:02

2025 expanded edition
No.	Title	Length
10.	"Portreath Harbour"	4:44
11.	"Redruth School"	2:43
12.	"Iketa"	4:30
13.	"Quoth" (Wooden Thump Mix)	7:57
14.	"Bike Pump Meets Bucket"	5:58
Total length:		74:54

== Personnel ==
Credits adapted from liner notes.

- Richard D. James – writing, production, arrangement, programming, engineering, location recording
- The Designers Republic – design
- Samantha Robinson – photography

== Charts ==
Chart performance for Surfing on Sine Waves
Chart (2025)	Peak position
Australian Vinyl Albums (ARIA)	19
Belgian Albums (Ultratop Flanders)	23
Dutch Vinyl Albums (GfK Dutch Charts)	9
Irish Independent Albums (IRMA)	17
Japanese Dance & Soul Albums (Oricon)	11
Scottish Albums (OCC)	9
Swiss Albums (Schweizer Hitparade)	72
UK Albums (OCC)	43
UK Dance Albums (OCC)	1
UK Independent Albums (OCC)	1
