= Analogue Bubblebath =

First record by the musician Aphex Twin

EP by The Aphex Twin
- Released: September 1991
- Genres: Acid; hardcore; ambient techno
- Length: 19:53
- Label: Mighty Force
- Producer: Richard D. James

Richard D. James chronology
Analogue Bubblebath (1991)	Analog Bubblebath Vol 2 (1991)

Analogue Bubblebath, also released as Aphex Twin ep, is the first record by the British musician and producer Richard D. James. The EP was released under his alias The Aphex Twin through Mighty Force Records in September 1991. It was the inaugural release for the label, which at the time was a record shop in Exeter. The record was hugely influential on the development of electronic music, particularly techno and ambient techno. Its release has been described as a key event in the history of dance music. It is the first release in what became the Analogue Bubblebath series.

James previously had little inclination to release his music, though it had long circulated on tapes amongst his friends, and he would include his tracks in his set when DJing. His reluctance was eventually overcome while he was tripping on acid at a rave where he was performing, where he finally agreed to release the record.

The initial pressing of 1000 copies sold out in less than a week; it was followed by further pressings of several thousand each. The title track was later described as "one of the most perfect tracks ever written" by the influential publication Mixmag, and is often called one of the best tracks in James' catalogue.

On release it was frequently played by London pirate radio stations and by the then newly-legal station Kiss FM. The record quickly gained James a cult following in the techno underground, and one of the early white label copies was heard by the head of R&S Records, leading to James' releases on that label.

== Background ==
James had been making tapes of his music since his school days, which then circulated amongst his friends. He also included tracks of his own music in his early DJ performances. He has often said that during this period he had little inclination to release his music. James preferred to keep his music exclusively for playing at his performances, similar to the use of dubplates in sound system culture.

Mark Darby, a free party organiser and rave promoter, opened the Mighty Force record shop in Exeter in January 1991. Like many independent record shops, it became an unofficial place for musicians and DJs to hang out, and was a focal point for the rave scene in the south west. James' friend Tom Middleton frequented the shop, and played Darby a C90 tape of James' music over the shop's sound system. Darby was eager to release music from it. He later commented: "I couldn’t believe it: it was like nothing I’d ever heard before." James was very reluctant to release a record on Darby's fledgling label. Darby stated that it took "around three months" to convince James to release it.

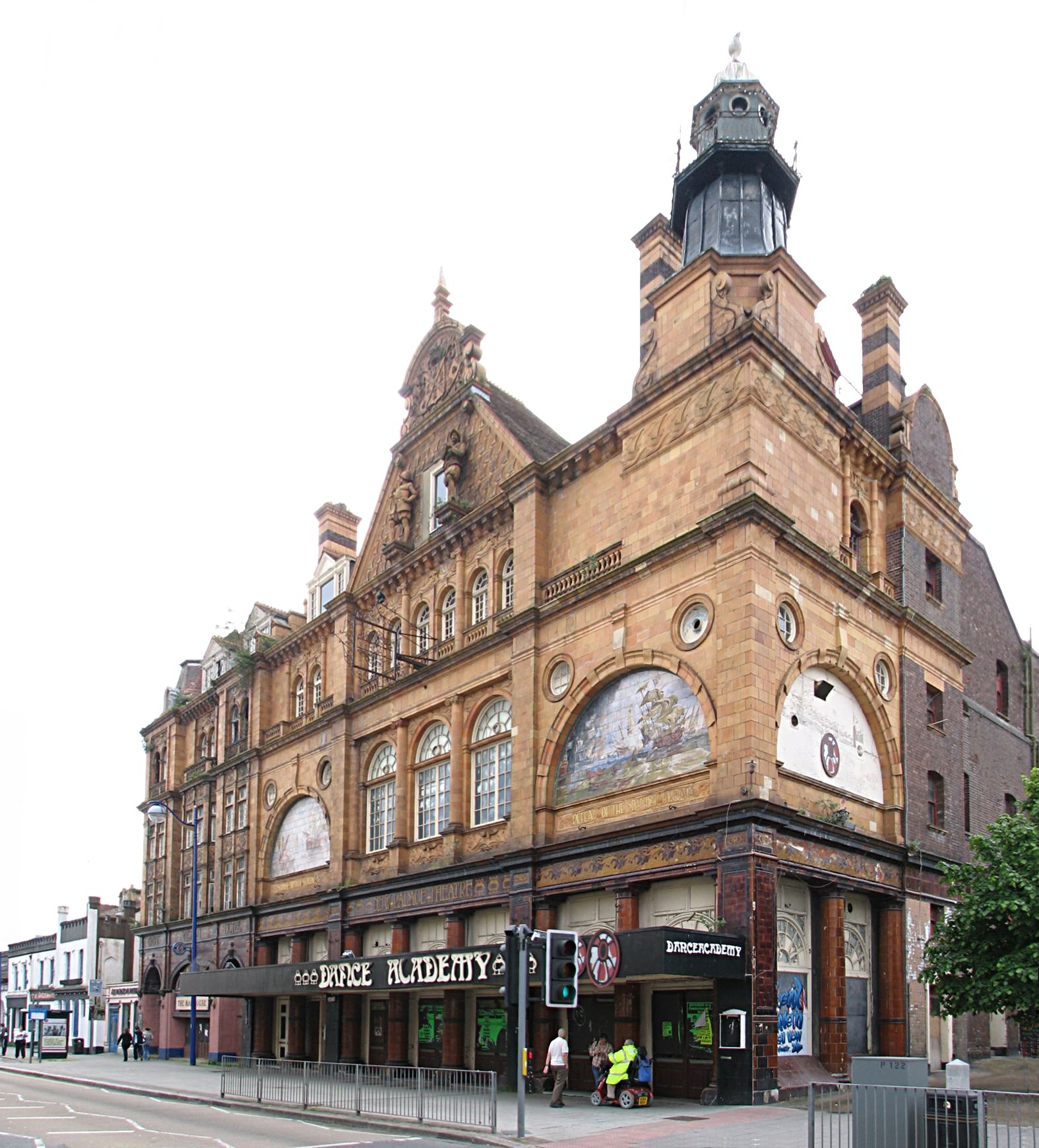
The Academy in Plymouth. The agreement to release the record was made during a rave at the venue.

Darby had booked James to perform at a rave at the Academy in Plymouth. During the rave James started tripping on acid. While James was tripping backstage after his set, Darby and Middleton were able to convince James to release the record. Darby later said "I think if he had not done that trip that night there may have never been any Aphex Twin." James has given a similar account: "they made me sign the contract when I was off my face. I was tripping and they're waving this money and a pen at me. It’s a bit clichéd but it's the way they got me to sign."

The original record was mastered from the C90 tape onto a Betamax F1 tape. The initial pressing of one thousand (12" vinyl) records was distributed by Darby's friends, taking copies to record shops around London, and it quickly sold out. Further pressings of several thousand each followed soon after.

== Music ==
Professional ratings
Review scores
Source	Rating
AllMusic	2.5/5 stars
The Rolling Stone Album Guide	4/5 stars

The music varies from Detroit-influenced ambient techno to intense acid and hardcore. The track "Isopropophlex" uses samples from the arcade game Berzerk, along with a flanged and filtered voice sample. The musician and producer Tom Middleton collaborated on "En Trance to Exit" under the pseudonym Schizophrenia.

Berlin DJ Ellen Allien called the track "Analogue Bubblebath" "a classic tune by the best electronic producer in the world." The author and critic Simon Reynolds writes of its "fluttery, diaphanous riff-pattern and hazy yet crystalline production". James' friend and fellow producer Tom Middleton considers it as "like pure emotion in sound". The influential publication Mixmag calls it "one of the most perfect tracks ever written". The Guardian describes it as "one of those timeless tracks that convey incredible emotional depth" and notes that "it still stands as a gold standard for electronic music nearly 30 years after its initial release." It is often cited as one of the best compositions in James' extensive discography.

Simon Reynolds observes that the rest of the EP "revealed that James was no slouch when it came to industrial-strength hardcore." In contrast to the ambient sound of the title track, the industrial, menacing sound of "Isopropophlex" is described as "astringent" and suggestive of "a nasty corrosive fluid". Critic Ira Robbins, writing in 1997, refers to its "aggressively sequenced dance rhythms". In an examination of James' work, The A.V. Club describes the track as "restless, a pounding bass line fighting it out with synths that stab through the arrangement with purposeful malice."

The tracks "Analogue Bubblebath" and "Isopropophlex" can also be found on the R&S Records compilation Classics. The EP was reissued by TVT Records in the US in 1994 on both CD and 12" vinyl format.

== Impact ==
The record created a buzz in the UK about Aphex Twin, and on release won immediate acclaim, quickly earning the artist a cult following. It was heavily played on the many pirate radio stations in London. It also had playlist support from influential London radio station Kiss FM, and was played frequently by DJ Colin Dale. The original white label release found distribution in continental Europe. Renaat Vandepapeliere, head of the Belgian label R&S Records, heard the record and then contacted James, which led to the releases James put out on that label in 1992.

The record went on to be hugely influential. Its title track is described as a "redrawing of ambient techno aesthetics" by Rolling Stone. The author Simon Reynolds writes that its sound "announced a new... direction in techno". The musician and Planet Mu founder Mike Paradinas said the record "was like a completely new English techno, completely inspired by his own influences." In 2011 The Guardian named its release one of the "key events in the history of dance music". In 2022, Rolling Stone ranked "Analogue Bubblebath" number 62 in their list of the "200 Greatest Dance Songs of All Time".

== Track listing ==
Side A
No.	Title	Length
1.	"Analogue Bubblebath"	4:40
2.	"Isopropophlex"	5:19

Side B
No.	Title	Length
3.	"En Trance to Exit" (with Schizophrenia)	4:22
4.	"AFX 2"	5:25
Total length:		19:53
