= Donkey Rhubarb (EP) =

EP by Aphex Twin
- Released: 14 August 1995
- Genre: Electronica
- Length: 24:10
- Label: Warp
- Producers: Richard D. James; Kurt Munkasci; Michael Reisman

Richard D. James chronology
| ...I Care Because You Do (1995) | Donkey Rhubarb (1995) | Bradley's Beat (1995) |

Donkey Rhubarb is a 1995 extended play record by the electronic music artist Aphex Twin. It was released on 14 August 1995 by Warp. The EP contains a version of the song "Icct Hedral" from James' album ...I Care Because You Do by Philip Glass.

== Release ==
Donkey Rhubarb was released on 14 August 1995 by Warp on 12" vinyl and compact disc. Donkey Rhubarb charted for one week in the United Kingdom at number 78 on the UK Singles Chart. A music video for "Donkey Rhubarb" directed by David Slade was made in 1995. The video was released on DVD by Warp in September 2003.

== Reception ==
Professional ratings
Review scores
| Source | Rating |
|---|---|
| AllMusic | 4/5 stars |

Spin referred to the track "Donkey Rhubarb" as a "silly steeldrum reverie". Ned Raggett of AllMusic gave the EP a four star rating, praising "Donkey Rhubarb" for its "lovely main melody dressed up with quick beats, bleeps, and the like" and stating about Philip Glass' version of "Icct Hedral" that "the original's chilly melody made even more serenely beautiful and disturbing all at once thanks to Glass' fine orchestration".

== Track listing ==
All tracks are written by Richard D. James except where otherwise noted

| No. | Title | Writer(s) | Length |
|---|---|---|---|
| 1. | "Donkey Rhubarb" | | 6:08 |
| 2. | "Vaz Deferenz" | | 5:49 |
| 3. | "Icct Hedral (Philip Glass Orchestration)" | Richard D. James, Philip Glass | 8:05 |
| 4. | "Pancake Lizard" | | 4:31 |
| Total length: | | | 24:10 |

2017 re-release bonus track
| No. | Title | Writer(s) | Length |
|---|---|---|---|
| 5. | "icct hedral [phillip glass dry version+bonus DAT glitches]" | Richard D James, Glass | 7:55 |
| Total length: | | | 32:05 |

== Credits ==
Credits adapted from Donkey Rhubarb disc.

- Richard D. James – producer (on tracks 1, 2 and 4), writer
- Philip Glass – writer (on track 3)
- Kurt Munkasci – producer (on track 3)
- Michael Reisman – producer (on track 3)
- Anne Pope – recording and mix engineer (on track 3)
- Rich Costey – additional engineer (on track 3)

== See also ==
- 1995 in music
- Music of the United Kingdom (1990s)
