= Bradley's Beat =

EP by Bradley Strider
- Released: 1995
- Genre: Techno; acid techno
- Length: 10:53; 12:02
- Label: Rephlex Records CAT 001

Richard D. James chronology
Donkey Rhubarb (1995)	Bradley's Beat (1995)	Hangable Auto Bulb (1995)

Additional covers
- 1995 pressing with sleeve

Alternative cover
- 1996 pressing

Bradley's Beat is an EP by Richard D. James, under the alias Bradley Strider, released by Rephlex Records in 1995.

The record has a 1991 copyright date, but there is no reference to it on any Rephlex promotional copy until its 1995 press release. The Rephlex label often put out misinformation about their release catalogue, which may explain this. Three pressings of the single are known to exist. Although all three have the same A-side track, the B-sides vary on the first two pressings and the third pressing has a grooveless B-side.

== Reception ==
In 2014, Andy Beta of Pitchfork listed Bradley's Beat as one of James's "10 Essential Releases", referring to its mix of dance techno and world music.

== 1995 pressings ==
On the below pressing, side A plays at 45 rpm and side B plays at 33 1/3 rpm.

Rephlex Records, CAT 001 EP
No.	Title	Length
1.	"Bradley's Beat (Part One)"	6:10
2.	"Bradley's Beat (Part Two)"	4:43
Total length:		10:53

On the below pressing, both sides play at 45 rpm.

Rephlex Records, CAT 001 EP
No.	Title	Length
1.	"Bradley's Beat (Part One)"	6:10
2.	"Bradley's Beat (Part Two)"	5:53
Total length:		12:02

== 1996 pressing ==
Xtra Nova, XN 4711 LTD
No.	Title	Length
1.	"Bradley's Beat (Part One)"	6:07
Total length:		6:07
