= Caustic Window (album) =

Studio album by Caustic Window
- Released: 2014
- Recorded: 1988–94
- Genres: IDM; acid house; acid techno; ambient techno
- Length: 69:25
- Label: Rephlex
- Producer: Richard D. James

Richard D. James chronology
Chosen Lords (2006)	Caustic Window (2014)	Syro (2014)

Caustic Window (also known as Caustic Window LP) is a studio album by Richard D. James under the alias Caustic Window. It was planned for release in 1996 but only a few test pressings were produced. After one copy surfaced for sale on Discogs in 2014, it was bought and digitally distributed through a Kickstarter campaign. It was eventually sold on eBay for $46,300 ($66,700 in 2026).

== Release ==
Although the tracks "Phlaps" and "Cunt" appeared on compilations in the 1990s, the album release was canceled. At least five copies were pressed in 1994. At least one was sold through the Record & Tape Exchange in Camden in the late 1990s. One of the copies surfaced on Discogs in 2014 priced at $13,500. In response, We Are the Music Makers, an electronic music forum, negotiated with Rephlex Records and initiated a Kickstarter project in which backers received a digital copy of the album. More than $47,000 ($66,894 in 2026) was raised.

After the Kickstarter campaign, the copy was sold on an eBay auction. Money raised from the sale was split evenly between the Kickstarter contributors, Richard D. James and Doctors Without Borders. The copy was bought by Markus "Notch" Persson, the creator of Minecraft, for $46,300 ($66,009 in 2026).

== Critical reception ==
Professional ratings
Review scores
Source	Rating
Consequence of Sound	C+
Pitchfork	8.1/10
Resident Advisor	4/5
The Rolling Stone Album Guide	3/5 stars

Mark Richardson of Pitchfork named Caustic Window the week's "best new reissue", and wrote: "Caustic Window LP probably wouldn’t have left a significant mark, and would have been heard as second-tier James. Twenty years later, though, we’re hearing it with that aura, that extra bit of longing that comes from how scarce music from James has become. And in that light, second tier is still very good indeed." Derek Staples of Consequence of Sound wrote that "the greatest gems within this collection highlight James’ foresight into electronic dance music", with "early examples of now trending tech-house ... This release might not have lived up to the lofty standards of the label, yet it remains relevant in a community of constant transition."

== Track listing ==
No.	Title	Length
1.	"Flutey"	8:20
2.	"Stomper 101mod Detunekik"	7:26
3.	"Mumbly"	5:31
4.	"Popeye"	1:19
5.	"Fingertrips"	4:17
6.	"Revpok"	3:43
7.	"AFX Tribal Kik"	1:06
8.	"Airflow"	5:06
9.	"Squidge in the Fridge"	4:09
10.	"Fingry"	4:51
11.	"Jazzphase"	4:23
12.	"101 Rainbows Ambient Mix"	8:52
13.	"Phlaps"	3:50
14.	"Cunt"	4:16
15.	"Phone Pranks"	2:16
