= Analogue Bubblebath Vol 3 =

- Cover for the 2002 vinyl reissue of Analogue Bubblebath vol. 3

EP by AFX
- Released: 1992
- Genres: Acid techno; techno
- Length: 32:23 (Vinyl); 54:32 (CD); 52:37 (Vinyl reissue)
- Label: Rephlex
- Producer: Richard D. James

Richard D. James chronology
Selected Ambient Works 85-92 (1992)	Analogue Bubblebath Vol 3 (1992)	Surfing on Sine Waves (1993)

Professional ratings
Review scores
Source	Rating
AllMusic	3.5/5 stars
The Rolling Stone Album Guide	4/5 stars

Analogue Bubblebath Vol 3 is an EP by the electronic music artist and producer Richard D. James, under the pseudonym of AFX, released in 1992 on Rephlex Records. It is the third release in the Analogue Bubblebath series, and his first release to use the AFX variation of his pseudonym Aphex Twin.

The original EP consists of nine songs distributed across eight tracks. It was originally released on 12" vinyl, then some months later (in early 1993) on compact disc, with five additional tracks. It entered the dance singles chart at number 40 on 13 February 1993.

In 1997 Rephlex Records released Analogue Bubblebath Vol 3.1 containing a selection of the CD only tracks on 12" vinyl.

Due to its myriad reissues and re-releases with additional tracks, omitted tracks and shuffled tracklisting across the different versions, Analogue Bubblebath Vol 3 is one of Richard D. James' most perplexing releases.

== Releases ==
=== Original vinyl release (1992) ===
The original vinyl release came in a brown paper bag, enclosed with liner notes describing Rephlex Records and various places of interest in Cornwall, England. The liner notes also contain instructions for playing the final track of side one (".0180871"), which is two songs running simultaneously, each panned to the left and right channels. All songs except for ".38" appeared on future re-releases. The original vinyl release is the only format of Analogue Bubblebath Vol 3 that is presented with a track listing.

=== Original CD release (1993) ===
The original CD release was sparse in its packaging; it came in a clear slimline jewel case, wrapped in bubble wrap. The case contained no liner notes whatsoever, save for a sticker affixed to the front, referring to the third release in the Analogue Bubblebath series and the mailing address for Rephlex Records. The sticker is subtitled with "66% more bubbles" and decorated with images of soap bubbles. The disc has no print or label on it. There is no indication of a track listing anywhere on the package; eight out of thirteen of the songs are identical to (or are edited versions of) those that appear on the vinyl format, but five of the songs (tracks 8, 9, 11, 12 and 13) have never been released with an official title. Of these five untitled songs, tracks 8, 9 and 13 would later appear in vinyl form on Analogue Bubblebath Vol 3.1 and the vinyl reissue of Analogue Bubblebath vol. 3, and track 11 would also appear on the vinyl reissue. The twelfth track is exclusive to the CD release. The playing order of the songs are also altered from the vinyl. The two songs entitled ".0180871" are the same as those that appear combined on the vinyl version, but are split into their own separate tracks.

=== Analogue Bubblebath 3.1 vinyl reissue (1997) ===
This release was an attempt to capture the tracks previously only available on the 1993 CD release but now on 12" vinyl. Confusingly, however, only three of the five CD tracks reappeared (tracks 8, 9 and 13 from the 1993 CD). This release also introduces a new hidden track of Richard D. James and his friends talking.

=== CD Reissue (1997) ===
The CD version was reissued in 1997 with minor differences in appearance and presentation. The "66% more bubbles" subtitle is replaced with composing and producing credits to Richard D. James, and the accompanying images of bubbles are replaced with Aphex Twin logos. The reissue has an additional sticker affixed to the back detailing legal information and other AFX releases available, such as Analogue Bubblebath 4. The CD version has since been released as a digital download.

=== Vinyl Reissue (2002) ===
The vinyl version saw a reissue in 2002. It was released as a double EP on 2 x 12" vinyl with updated artwork and featuring most of the tracks from the 1993 CD release. The cover art features pictograms of a woman and a man. The playing order of the songs differ to those of both the original vinyl version and CD version and the tracklisting is, again, technically incomplete. Notably missing is "AFX 6/b", the 12th CD track "untitled", and the hidden track of Richard D. James and his friends talking.

== Track listing ==
All songs written and composed by Richard D. James.

=== Original vinyl version (1992) ===
==== Side one ====
1. ".215061" – 4:16
2. ".000890569" – 4:31
3. ".38" – 0:38
4. ".0180871"
  - Left channel – 3:45
  - Right channel – 4:10

==== Side two ====
1. ".55278037732581" – 4:18
2. ".942937" – 4:31
3. ".1993841" – 5:43
4. "AFX 6/b" – 0:31

=== Compact Disc version (1993 & 1997) ===
1. ".215061" – 3:53 (sample)
2. ".1993841" – 8:02
3. ".0180871a" – 4:16
4. ".942937" – 4:37
5. ".0180871b" – 3:52
6. ".000890569" – 4:48
7. ".55278037732581" – 4:20
8. "(CAT 00897-AA1)" – 4:05
9. "(CAT 00897-A1)" – 5:06
10. "Afx 6/b" – 0:36
11. (untitled) – 4:41
12. (untitled) – 0:53
13. "(CAT 00897-A2)" – 5:14

=== Analogue Bubblebath 3.1 vinyl reissue (1997) ===
==== Side one ====
1. Untitled (CD track 9) - 5:06
2. Untitled (CD track 13) - 5:05

==== Side two ====
1. Untitled (CD track 8) - 4:14
2. Untitled - 2:26

=== Vinyl reissue (2002) ===
==== Side one ====
1. ".215061" – 3:50
2. ".000890569" – 4:48
3. ".0180871R" – 4:11

==== Side two ====
1. ".942937" – 4:31
2. ".55278037732581" – 4:19
3. ".0180871L" – 3:52

==== Side three ====
1. ".1993841" – 8:03
2. "(CAT 00897-AA1)" – 4:06

==== Side four ====
1. "(CAT 00897-A1)" – 5:07
2. "(CAT 00897-A2)" – 5:15
3. "(CD Only Track #1)"-4:42
