= Orphaned Deejay Selek 2006–08 =

EP by AFX
- Released: 21 August 2015
- Recorded: 2006–08
- Length: 26:51 / 45:49
- Label: Warp
- Producer: Richard D. James

AFX chronology
Computer Controlled Acoustic Instruments pt2 (2015)	Orphaned Deejay Selek 2006–08 (2015)	Cheetah (2016)

Professional ratings
Aggregate scores
Source	Rating
Metacritic	79/100
Review scores
Source	Rating
AllMusic	4/5 stars
Drowned in Sound	7/10
Exclaim!	8/10
The Music	3.5/4 stars
Pitchfork	8.1/10
Release Magazine	6/10
Tiny Mix Tapes	3.5/5 stars

Orphaned Deejay Selek 2006–08 is an extended play record by the musician and producer Richard D. James under his alias AFX. It is the first EP using that moniker since 2005's Analord. It was announced by Warp Records on 2 July 2015 and a listing appeared on Bleep.com on the same day. An announcement for the EP also appeared on the Aphex Twin Twitter account on that date. Along with Warp Records' announcement, "serge fenix Rendered 2", the first track on the EP, was made available for streaming on SoundCloud.

The EP was re-released with extra tracks and different sequencing via James' Bleep Store on 20 July 2017. The cover is by The Designers Republic, and bears notable similarity to that of Warp's first release, Forgemasters' "Track With No Name" from 1989.

The four bonus tracks included on the 2017 re-release were also issued separately in 2019 as Manchester 20.09.2019, a limited edition 12" and digital EP release.

== Track listing ==
Original release

All tracks are written by Richard D. James.

No.	Title	Length
1.	"serge fenix Rendered 2"	3:16
2.	"dmx acid test"	1:17
3.	"oberheim blacet1b"	3:25
4.	"bonus EMT beats"	4:46
5.	"simple slamming b 2"	3:51
6.	"midi pipe1c sds3time cube/klonedrm"	2:27
7.	"NEOTEKT72"	6:10
8.	"r8m neotek beat"	1:42
Total length:		26:51

2017 re-release

No.	Title	Length
1.	"serge fenix Rendered 2"	3:16
2.	"dmx acid test"	1:17
3.	"bonus EMT beats"	4:46
4.	"simple slamming b 2"	3:51
5.	"midi pipe1c sds3time cube/klonedrm"	2:26
6.	"oberheim blacet1b"	3:25
7.	"r8m neotek beat"	1:42
8.	"NEOTEKT72"	6:10
9.	"midi pipe2c edit,+3"	4:09
10.	"rozzboxv2mam+4"	4:35
11.	"pretend analog extmix 2b,e2,ru"	5:25
12.	"umil 25-01"	4:48
Total length:		45:49

== Charts ==
Chart (2015)	Peak position
Scottish Albums (Official Charts)	78
UK Albums (Official Charts)	34
UK Dance Albums (Official Charts)	12
UK Album Downloads (Official Charts)	82
UK Independent Albums (Official Charts)	3
US Independent Albums (Billboard)	38
US Heatseekers Albums (Billboard)	10
