= Analogue Bubblebath 4 =

EP by AFX
- Released: August 1994
- Genre: Electronic music
- Length: 26:22
- Label: Rephlex
- Producer: Richard D. James

Richard D. James chronology
GAK (1994)	Analogue Bubblebath 4 (1994)	Classics (1995)

Professional ratings
Review scores
Source	Rating
AllMusic	2.5/5 stars

Analogue Bubblebath 4 (also titled Analogue Bubblebath IV) is an EP by Richard D. James under his alias AFX. It is the fourth release in the Analogue Bubblebath series.

The EP consists of four tracks (plus one hidden track on CD releases). It was released in 1994 on Rephlex Records in both CD and 12" vinyl formats.

With the exception of Cuckoo, the tracks are officially untitled. The fifth track of the CD reissue is actually a heavily modulated snippet from a press conference with Evel Knievel, sometime after the Snake River Canyon incident. It is often nicknamed "Knievel."

== 12" track listing ==
1. untitled – 6:22
2. Cuckoo – 5:08
3. untitled – 6:04
4. untitled – 8:21

=== 2003 CD reissue ===
1. untitled – 6:22
2. Cuckoo – 6:04
3. untitled – 5:08
4. untitled – 8:21
5. untitled (aka Knievel) – 0:27
