= ...I Care Because You Do =

1995 studio album by Aphex Twin

Studio album by Aphex Twin
- Released: 24 April 1995
- Recorded: 1990–1994
- Genres: IDM; techno; avant-garde; trip hop; ambient; classical; acid techno
- Length: 63:49
- Label: Warp
- Producer: Richard D. James

Richard D. James chronology
Ventolin E.P (1995)	...I Care Because You Do (1995)	Donkey Rhubarb (1995)

Aphex Twin album chronology
Classics (1995)	...I Care Because You Do (1995)	Richard D. James Album (1996)

...I Care Because You Do is a studio album by the British electronic music artist and producer Aphex Twin. It was released on 24 April 1995 through Warp Records and contains material recorded between 1990 and 1994. It marked James's return to a beat-driven sound following the mostly ambient album Selected Ambient Works Volume II (1994), and combines abrasive rhythms with symphonic and ambient elements. The cover artwork is a self-portrait of James.

I Care Because You Do entered the Dance Albums Chart at No. 4 and the Albums Chart at No. 24. It was supported by the single and Extended Play (EP) release of the track "Ventolin". The album received positive reviews. It garnered comparisons to the work of composer Philip Glass, who later created an orchestral version of the track "Icct Hedral", and John Cage. The reviewers for Entertainment Weekly, Spin, and Rolling Stone preferred it to his two previous albums. In 2017 Pitchfork ranked ...I Care Because You Do the 13th best IDM album of all time.

== Composition ==
Each track on ...I Care Because You Do is annotated with a date; the tracks were created between 1990 and 1994. It was James' final album to be recorded with mostly analogue technology before he began using digital production methods.

According to AllMusic, the album finds James "pairing his hardcore experimentalism with more symphonic ambient material, aligned with the work of many post-classical composers" such as Philip Glass. Writer Dave Thompson described the album as "pulling together calm, serene moments then launching into battering and bruising beat-heavy tracks", and said the rhythms shift "from trancey to hip-hoppish". Thompson also noted the influence of modern composers such as Glass. Rolling Stone stated the music has "little to do with techno in any of its more popular guises", and compared it to the work of Glass and John Cage, and said the album draws "most strongly from hip-hop ... James' trademark is to put rhythm and percussion above all else; his beautiful, haunting melodies are relegated to the back of the mix."

According to Exclaim!, ...I Care Because You Do has been described as "occupying a middle-ground between Philip Glass and the Wu-Tang Clan". Spin wrote the album "showed up trip-hop laziness", while Dummy Mag said James was taking trip hop and "refashioning [the] voguish genre in his own image". Entertainment Weekly wrote: "By adding layers of soft, warm synthesizer chords over skull-grinding electronic percussion, James creates sounds that are simultaneously comforting and scary". In 2003 NME summarized the album as "a shotgun wedding of analogue rave and ambient porridge." In 2004 Rolling Stone stated the increasingly active drum backing on the album was inspired by the presence of drum and bass music in the United Kingdom.

== Release ==
...I Care Because You Do was released on 24 April 1995 on vinyl record, compact disc, and cassette. It entered the CIN's Dance Albums Chart at number 4 and the Albums Chart at number 24, remaining on the latter for two weeks. The label 1972 re-released the album on vinyl on 18 September 2012. Warp also re-issued the album in vinyl with a download card on 8 October 2012. In 2017, the album was re-released in digital format with eight bonus tracks.

The album's cover artwork is a self-portrait painted by James using Adobe Photoshop, a software his friend Johnny Clayton taught him how to use when he received his first Apple Mac. It was the first of several Aphex Twin releases to feature an image of James' grinning face on the cover.

Following the album's release, composer Philip Glass contributed an orchestral arrangement to "Icct Hedral" that was included on the 1995 EP Donkey Rhubarb.

== Reception ==
Professional ratings
Review scores
Source	Rating
AllMusic	4/5 stars
Entertainment Weekly	A−
The Guardian	3/4 stars
Tom Hull – on the Web	A−
The Philadelphia Inquirer	3/4 stars
Rolling Stone	4/5 stars
The Rolling Stone Album Guide	3.5/5 stars
Select	4/5
Spin	8/10
The Sydney Morning Herald	3.5/5 stars

Select ranked ...I Care Because You Do at 42 on its 1995 "Top 50 Albums of the Year" list, saying the album is "Leftfield, sound-pop brilliance" and James' "most coherent work to date". Another review in Select stated James had the ability to "make the avant-garde sound pop" and that he "delivers complex contemporary systems music in the most deliciously simple forms". The Sydney Morning Herald gave the album a positive review, stating: "As ever, [James'] palette of sound is astonishing, his arrangements effective and deliberate". Rolling Stone described the album as "classical music for a generation raised on samplers", stating James was "making some of the most engaging and important music of our time".

Entertainment Weekly praised ...I Care Because You Do and called it superior work to Selected Ambient Works Volume II, writing it "reintroduces tension, more beats per minute, and sonic grime into his music", and that it "creates sounds that are simultaneously comforting and scary – a fitting metaphor for the contemporary clash of technology and the humans befuddled by it". Spin also stated that album is superior to Selected Ambient Works Volume II because ...I Care Because You Do "cut the middle of [techno]'s kitchen-sink aesthetic without sacrificing melody coherence or rhythm". Spin also described it as "a real album with its own gestalt", in which capacity it betters the "truly great" Aphex Twin albums Selected Ambient Works 85–92 (1992) and Classics (1995).

In a retrospective of James' work in The Rolling Stone Album Guide, Sasha Frere-Jones said the album's more-recent tracks were its best ones. Justin Boreta from the group The Glitch Mob reviewed the album in 2015, praising it for "the juxtaposition between heavy darkness and gentle depth". The A.V. Club reviewer Kyle Fowle described ...I Care Because You Do as "a perfect bridge between James' implementation of experimental techno and glossy ambient". In 2017, Pitchfork ranked it the 13th-best intelligent dance music (IDM) album of all time.

== Track listing ==
Each track on ...I Care Because You Do is annotated with the year of its recording.

...I Care Because You Do track listing
No.	Title	Length
1.	"Acrid Avid Jam Shred" (1994)	7:38
2.	"The Waxen Pith" (1993)	4:50
3.	"Wax the Nip" (1990)	4:19
4.	"Icct Hedral (edit)" (1994)	6:07
5.	"Ventolin (video version)" (1994)	4:29
6.	"Come On You Slags!" (1990)	5:45
7.	"Start as You Mean to Go On" (1993)	6:05
8.	"Wet Tip Hen Ax" (1994)	5:17
9.	"Mookid" (1994)	3:51
10.	"Alberto Balsalm" (1994)	5:11
11.	"Cow Cud Is a Twin" (1994)	5:34
12.	"Next Heap With" (1993)	4:43
Total length:		63:49

On 20 February 2017, James uploaded the album to his website with 8 additional tracks.

...I Care Because You Do aphextwin.warp.net track listing
No.	Title	Length
1.	"Acrid Avid Jam Shred" (1994)	7:38
2.	"The Waxen Pith" (1993)	4:50
3.	"Wax the Nip" (1990)	4:19
4.	"Icct Hedral (edit)" (1994)	6:07
5.	"Ventolin (video version)" (1994)	4:29
6.	"Come On You Slags!" (1990)	5:45
7.	"Start as You Mean to Go On" (1993)	6:05
8.	"Wet Tip Hen Ax" (1994)	5:17
9.	"Mookid" (1994)	3:51
10.	"Alberto Balsalm" (1994)	5:11
11.	"Cow Cud Is a Twin" (1994)	5:34
12.	"efil pearls, e,+4"	5:57
13.	"winding road, e,+4.1"	3:15
14.	"with my family [48k] *"	4:11
15.	"consta-lume"	7:04
16.	"merry maidens e,ru,ec +4"	2:18
17.	"no cares [48k ] *"	2:49
18.	"consciousness utopia"	7:18
19.	"sekonda e,+2"	10:44
20.	"Next Heap With" (1994)	4:43
Total length:		107:25

== Personnel ==
The album credits only state: "Everything by Richard D. James. Self portrait painted by me. Design help from John."

== Charts ==
Chart performance for ...I Care Because You Do
Chart (1995)	Peak position
Scottish Albums (Official Charts)	70
UK Albums (Official Charts)	24
UK Dance Albums Chart (CIN)	4

== See also ==
- 1995 in music
- Music of the United Kingdom (1990s)
