= Music from the Merch Desk (2016–2023) =

Compilation album by Aphex Twin
- Released: 17 December 2024
- Recorded: 2016–2023
- Genre: Electronic; experimental; dance
- Length: 155:56
- Label: Warp
- Producer: Richard D. James

Aphex Twin chronology
Selected Ambient Works Volume II (Expanded Edition) (2024)	Music from the Merch Desk (2016–2023) (2024)

Music from the Merch Desk (2016–2023) is a compilation album by British electronic music artist and producer Richard D. James, released under the alias of Aphex Twin. The album was released without announcement on 17 December 2024 through Warp Records. It compiles a number of James' tracks released only on vinyl at his concerts. The album's artwork came from a bootleg T-shirt, which was later resold as official merchandise.

== Background ==
=== 2016–2017 ===
The first release that would make up Music from the Merch Desk came from an Aphex Twin concert at Day for Night in Houston. James was announced to perform at the festival on 13 September 2016, leading to him performing on 17 December. A 12-inch vinyl record with white artwork, Aphex Twin and Warp Records logos and the text Houston, TX 12.17.16 was sold as merchandise at the concert. The record had two tracks; while originally untitled, the tracks were named "no stillson 6 cirk" and "no stillson 6 cirk mix2" on James' webstore and on Music from the Merch Desk.

On 27 November 2016, James was announced as a headliner at Field Day 2017. The concert was scheduled to take place on 3 June 2017. Similarly, another 12-inch vinyl record was being sold at the concert. The record came in a green unmarked sleeve, an Aphex Twin branded bag and contained 11 tracks. The record sold out by 2pm.

An official webstore that hosted James' music was opened on 20 July 2017. In addition to releasing London 03.06.17 and other bonus tracks from the release, a digital 4-track EP titled Orphans was made available. Two mixes of "Spiral Staircase" by Luke Vibert were included, along with "Nightmail" and "4x Atlantis take1".

=== 2019–2023 ===
James was announced to be performing at Printworks on 14 September 2019. Another vinyl record was being sold at the concert, containing songs from Orphans and a new track titled "Soundlab20". James later performed at The Warehouse Project on 20 September; a four-track vinyl record was made available as merchandise. On 16 June 2023, James performed during the Sónar festival in Barcelona. A 10-inch vinyl record with two tracks was released at the festival; "rfc pt8" and "afxfm e". On 19 September, James performed at 2023's Field Day festival. A limited 12-inch in a pink record sleeve was sold as merchandise; the record had five tracks.

== Composition ==
"Nightmail"
A track originating from Orphans and London 14.09.2019. "Nightmail" features repetitive vocal loops and melodies reminiscent of acid music.

Music from the Merch Desk (2016–2023) has been described as electronic, experimental and dance. In a review for The Guardian, John Doran discussed tracks such as "Nightmail", calling it a "late-90s hardcore battle weapon" and commenting on its "hypnotic vocal loop". Doran commented on the track "T13 Quadraverbia N+3", saying it contained "very jolly, extremely flanged hyperpop". The review also noted the track "Soundlab20" and its resemblance to Syro, and "em2500 M253X" having resemblance to the composition of Drukqs.

In a review for Pitchfork, Andrew Ryce commented on tracks such as "T20A ede 441", calling it "as hyperactive as something off Drukqs". The track "rfc pt8", taken from Barcelona 16.06.2023, was described by Ryce as a "psychedelic acid odyssey". "Nightmail" contains acid lines and "feverish" vocal loops, which Ryce compared to earlier music published by James under the AFX alias. A review of the compilation by Alex Hudson of Exclaim! discussed tracks such as "T16.5 MADMA with nastya", calling it a "mellow" track and commenting on its use of reverb, reminiscent of Selected Ambient Works 85-92. The "free time echoes" of "sk8 littletune HS-PC202" were also reminiscent of Selected Ambient Works Volume II, Hudson stated.

== Release ==
Music from the Merch Desk (2016–2023) was listed on streaming platforms on 16 December 2024, before officially being released on 17 December 2024, with no prior announcement, through Warp Records. The compilation was made available on streaming services such as Spotify and Apple Music, making it the first time the tour material has been available on these services.

The artwork for the release was based on a bootleg T-shirt design. This design was later taken by Warp and sold during Aphex Twin concerts as official merchandise.

== Track listing ==
All tracks written and produced by Richard D. James.

Music from the Merch Desk (2016–2023) track listing
No.	Title	Original release	Length
1.	"no stillson 6 cirk"	Houston, TX 12.17.16	10:49
2.	"no stillson 6 cirk mix2"	Houston, TX 12.17.16	9:59
3.	"42DIMENSIT3 e3"	London 03.06.17	4:42
4.	"MT1T1 bedroom microtune"	London 03.06.17	3:48
5.	"T18A pole1"	London 03.06.17	3:44
6.	"T03 delta t"	London 03.06.17	4:01
7.	"em2500 M253X"	London 03.06.17	1:52
8.	"T23 441"	London 03.06.17	2:52
9.	"42DIMENSIT10"	London 03.06.17	3:07
10.	"T20A ede 441"	London 03.06.17	2:38
11.	"MT1T2 olpedroom"	London 03.06.17	1:57
12.	"T47 smodge"	London 03.06.17	1:41
13.	"sk8 littletune HS-PC202"	London 03.06.17	2:28
14.	"T13 Quadraverbia N+3"	London 03.06.17	3:17
15.	"T16.5 MADMA with nastya"	London 03.06.17	4:58
16.	"T17 Phase out +3"	London 03.06.17	4:25
17.	"15T63 neotek 2h949 +3 [bonus beats]"	London 03.06.17	1:36
18.	"T08 dx1+5"	London 03.06.17	6:43
19.	"T69T07 stasspa+3"	London 03.06.17	5:15
20.	"T05 tx16w marion MT***,e [sketches]"	London 03.06.17	4:04
21.	"T46 se70 rinseout2 [sketches]"	London 03.06.17	2:22
22.	"ZT01 [sketch1]"	London 03.06.17	3:08
23.	"21TXT1+4 ds8 flngchrods[sketch0.1b]"	London 03.06.17	3:49
24.	"Spiral Staircase (AFX Remix)" (featuring Luke Vibert, AFX)	London 14.09.2019	5:05
25.	"4x Atlantis Take 1"	London 14.09.2019	3:49
26.	"Nightmail"	London 14.09.2019	5:04
27.	"Soundlab20"	London 14.09.2019	6:57
28.	"pretend analog extmix 2b,e2,ru"	Manchester 20.09.2019	5:26
29.	"rozzboxv2mam+4"	Manchester 20.09.2019	4:33
30.	"umil 25-01 (Note: "umil 25-01" was previously released as a bonus track for Orphaned Deejay Selek 2006–08.)"	Manchester 20.09.2019	4:47
31.	"midi pipe2c edit, +3"	Manchester 20.09.2019	4:09
32.	"rfc pt8"	Barcelona 16.06.2023	4:16
33.	"afxfm e"	Barcelona 16.06.2023	2:57
34.	"korg funk5"	London 19.08.2023	3:21
35.	"korg 1b ru,ec,e"	London 19.08.2023	3:02
36.	"SOOG e"	London 19.08.2023	3:28
37.	"body pads"	London 19.08.2023	2:53
38.	"dgitne tst1e"	London 19.08.2023	2:54
Total length:			155:56
