= Acoustica: Alarm Will Sound Performs Aphex Twin =

Acoustica

Studio album by Alarm Will Sound
- Released: 12 July 2005
- Recorded: 2005
- Genre: Contemporary classical; electronic
- Length: 68:23
- Label: Cantaloupe Music
- Producer: Lawson White

Alarm Will Sound chronology
Tehillim / The Desert Music (2002)	Acoustica (2005)	Reich at the Roxy (2006)

Acoustica is a 2005 album by the American chamber orchestra Alarm Will Sound. The album consists of acoustic arrangements of electronic tracks originally composed by Richard D. James (also known as Aphex Twin), and originally appearing on his albums Selected Ambient Works Volume II, Richard D. James Album and Drukqs.

== Track listing ==
All tracks are written by Richard D. James

No.	Title	Arranged by	Length
1.	"Cock/Ver 10" (from Drukqs, 2001)	Stefan Freund	5:14
2.	"Logan Rock Witch" (from Richard D. James Album, 1996)	Jonathan Newman	3:28
3.	"Meltphace 6" (from Drukqs, 2001)	Payton MacDonald	6:20
4.	"Blue Calx" (from Selected Ambient Works Volume II, 1994)	Caleb Burhans	7:14
5.	"Fingerbib" (from Richard D. James Album, 1996)	Newman	3:49
6.	"Gwely Mernans" (from Drukqs, 2001)	Ken Thomson	4:57
7.	"4" (from Richard D. James Album, 1996)	Jessica Johnson, MacDonald	3:31
8.	"Prep Gwarlek 3b" (from Drukqs, 2001)	Courtney Orlando	1:08
9.	"Omgyjya-Switch7" (from Drukqs, 2001)	Evan Hause	5:08
10.	"Cliffs" (from Selected Ambient Works Volume II, 1994)	Burhans	7:20
11.	"Jynweythek Ylow" (from Drukqs, 2001)	John Orfe	2:29
12.	"Mt Saint Michel + Saint Michaels Mount" (from Drukqs, 2001)	MacDonald, Orfe	3:41
13.	"Avril 14th" (from Drukqs, 2001)	John Pickford Richards	1:58
14.	"Prep Gwarlek 3B Remix" (from Drukqs, 2001)	Dennis DeSantis	6:00
15.	"Cliffs Remix" (from Selected Ambient Works Volume II, 1994)	DeSantis	5:46
Total length:			1:08:03

Professional ratings
Review scores
Source	Rating
AllMusic	4/5 stars
Pitchfork	5.9/10
PopMatters	9/10
Prefix Magazine	7/10
Tiny Mix Tapes	4/5 stars
