= Blackbox Life Recorder 21f =

Single by Aphex Twin

from the EP Blackbox Life Recorder 21f / In a Room7 F760
- Released: 21 June 2023
- Genre: IDM; ambient techno; breakbeat; ambient
- Length: 4:23; 3:32 (Parallax mix)
- Label: Warp
- Songwriter(s): Richard D. James

Aphex Twin singles chronology
"3 Gerald Remix / 24 TSIM 2" (2017)	"Blackbox Life Recorder 21f" (2023)	"#19" (2024)

Music video
- "Blackbox Life Recorder 21f" on YouTube

"Blackbox Life Recorder 21f" is a track by the British electronic music artist and producer Aphex Twin. It was first released as the lead single in promotion of the EP Blackbox Life Recorder 21f / In a Room7 F760, his first new music under the Aphex Twin alias in five years since 2018's Collapse EP. The EP also contains an alternate "Parallax mix" as the final track on the record.

== Background ==
The track was initially teased on SoundCloud on the day of its release, before being officially released on streaming services before quickly being removed, only for it to gain popularity on major demand-side platforms; a YouTuber's upload was quickly taken down. Around the same time, streaming service Deezer posted details for the EP the track will be on, which was also deleted; the EP and track was officially announced through Bandcamp through Warp Records.

== Reception ==
Pitchfork described the track as having some of the most gentle synth-work Aphex Twin has made in "ages", with "analog-sounding drum machines", "snares and rimshots so dry they're practically vacuum-sealed", and noting that "nagging breakbeats poke and prod" with crash symbols and soft, ruminative synths being found throughout the track, with the ending of the track being described as "somber ambience". Overall it was called similar to the track "T69 Collapse" from the Collapse EP.

According to Stereogum, the track is a "heady, lovely, blur of a song" with drum programming that encourages dancing.

BrooklynVegan noted the track featured many of the "glitchy" trademarks of Richard D. James music but "is almost poppy, with an infectious, danceable beat that never flies off the rails."

== Music video ==
The official music video was released on 31 July 2023 on YouTube, directed by visual artist Weirdcore. There is a dedication at the end of the video to James' late parents, Derek and Lorna.

== Charts ==
Chart performance for "Blackbox Life Recorder 21f"
Chart (2023)	Peak position
UK Singles (OCC)	79
UK Dance (OCC)	30
UK Indie (OCC)	32
US Hot Dance/Electronic Songs (Billboard)	25
