= Selected Ambient Works Volume II =

Studio album by Aphex Twin
- Released: 7 March 1994
- Recorded: 1992–1993
- Genres: Ambient; dark ambient; electronic; drone; minimalism
- Length: 156:42 (CD); 166:53 (LP/MC); 184:53 (Expanded Edition)
- Label: Warp
- Producer: Richard D. James

Richard D. James chronology
On (1993)	Selected Ambient Works Volume II (1994)	GAK (1994)

Aphex Twin album chronology
Selected Ambient Works 85–92 (1992)	Selected Ambient Works Volume II (1994)	Classics (1995)

Selected Ambient Works Volume II (abbreviated as SAW II) is a studio album by the British electronic music artist and producer Aphex Twin. It was released on 7 March 1994 through Warp Records. Its title follows James's ambient techno debut Selected Ambient Works 85–92, but Volume II largely features purely ambient music. James was inspired by lucid dreaming and likened the album to "standing in a power station on acid." Most of the tracks on Selected Ambient Works Volume II were untitled and represented with abstract photographs and pie charts. Fan-named, unofficial titles are still widely used today.

The record entered the CIN's Dance Albums Chart at No. 1 and the Albums Chart at No. 11. The album had a polarised reception from critics upon release. Contemporary critical reviews focus on its largely beatless composition and the repetition throughout. Retrospective reviews of the album are positive, and have described its major role in the evolution of ambient music and electronica. In 2016, Pitchfork picked Selected Ambient Works Volume II as the second greatest ambient album of all time, after Brian Eno's Ambient 1: Music for Airports. A remastered and expanded reissue of the album was released in October 2024 with two bonus tracks.

== Background ==
Richard D. James, known professionally as Aphex Twin, is an electronic music producer from Cornwall. After his first release, the 1991 acid techno EP Analogue Bubblebath, his first studio album, Selected Ambient Works 85–92, released to critical acclaim in 1992 with R&S Records. The ambient techno album was a defining factor in the evolution of electronic music and immediately garnered James an underground following. Arriving at the peak of the "house explosion", the album was in contrast to the era's "hardcore" and "aggressive" electronica and "proved that techno could be more than druggy dance music". James signed with Warp Records, where he released albums such as Surfing on Sine Waves under different aliases. He also pursued his own record label, Rephlex Records. James's EP, On, directly preceded Volume II's release.

== Recording and composition ==
James's enigmatic persona, marked by reticent interviews and outlandish, unverifiable claims, has deepened the mystique around his life and music and blurred facts about his recording process with fiction. James has stated that most of Selected Ambient Works Volume II had been recorded in 1993, a year before the album's official release, in his London and Cornwall home studios. The track "Blue Calx" was recorded sometime between 1988 and 1990; James has said that it was the last he recorded in his older Cornwall home studio at his parents' house, during a visit back from his studies at Cornwall College. His North London home studio, built in 1993, contained a variety of old EMS, Moog, ARP, and Oberheim Matrix synthesizers. James once specified that track 23 ("Tassels") had been recorded with an EMS Synthi A Mk1 and a Studiomaster Star System. A Yamaha CS-5 was also used in the recording of the album, and was later auctioned with the album's liner notes inscribed.

"#3"
The third track on the album, known as "Rhubarb". #3 is a soft ambient piece made up of a repeating chord progression.

Volume II differs significantly from Selected Ambient Works 85–92. Rather than featuring tracks driven by ambient techno and soft breakbeats, Volume II features both quiet and minimal compositions and "chilly" textured soundscapes that have been described as "dark", "forboding" and "empty". GQ India assessed: "Not at all strictly ambient pieces, [the album's tracks were] a new kind of electronic pastoral music that spoke to the shape-shifting producer's deep relationship with the Cornish landscape and its mythology." The album makes liberal use of microtonal musical tunings, an interest of James's at the time.

James credited the album to his lucid dreaming. He said upon waking from sleep in his studio, he would attempt to recreate and record the sounds, though he struggled to fully replicate them. James compared the album with "standing in a power station on acid", feeling the hum and dreamlike presence of the surrounding electricity.

"I'd go to sleep for ten minutes and write three tracks – only small segments, not 100 per cent finished tracks. I'd wake up and I'd only been asleep for ten minutes. That's quite mental."

— Richard D. James, 1995

Simon Reynolds commented that, on Volume II, James changed styles "from the idyllic, Satie-esque naïveté of early tracks like 'Analogue Bubblebath' to clammy, foreboding sound-paintings." Reynolds stated that, along with other artists such as Seefeel, David Toop and Max Eastley, James had moved from "rave" into the vicinity of "isolationism", a term coined by Kevin Martin to label music that "breaks with all of ambient's feel-good premises. Isolationism is ice-olationist, offering cold comfort. Instead of pseudopastoral peace, it evokes an uneasy silence: the uncanny calm before catastrophe, the deathly quiet of aftermath." Critics elsewhere have referred to the record as dark ambient, as well as drone.

Writer Mark J. Prendergast discussed Volume II for his 2000 book The Ambient Century. Prendergast noted how the general effect of the album on the listener was one that "evoked a sense of awe". Prendergast described the overall composition of Volume II as "waking dreams, replete with muffled cooing voices and phantom rhythms". He commented on a variety of tracks of Volume II. Track 3 ("Rhubarb") was described as one that emerged from a "dense fog". Track 5 ("Grass") was highlighted for its "slow, tribal" beat; Prendergast also noted it had a "kind of discreet Soviet atmosphere". Track 17 ("Z Twig") contained "keyboard splashes set to various sound frequencies" that Prendergast described as "lovely".

In a later discussion about the album, Dan Carr of Reverb called the composition of track 3 ("Rhubarb") a "rhythmically shapeless piece" which is based around a "beautiful-sounding chord progression that is repeated throughout the entire song". Carlos Hawthorn writing for Resident Advisor noted the chilling atmosphere of track 22 ("Spots"), which featured a sample taken from a stolen police interview tape with a woman who had murdered her husband. In a piece for The Quietus, John Doran noted how track 8 ("Blur") and track 9 ("Weathered Stone") featured a "quantized pulse". A retrospective review for Pitchfork described track 16 ("Grey Stripe") as "pure filtered white noise", like "the dying breath of a distant star". Track 19 ("Stone in Focus") is a slow track that contains a ticking metronome and a "slow swell" fading in and out.

== Artwork ==
An example of the photography seen throughout Volume II to represent its tracks. This image represents track 2 ("Radiator").

The artwork for the album was designed by Paul Nicholson, who was credited as Prototype 21 in the liner notes.

Most of the tracks on Volume II were not given official titles; rather, each track was instead represented by a photograph in the album's artwork. Nicholson stated in an interview with Resident Advisor that the photographs were taken by James's girlfriend at the time, known only as "Sam", and that most of the photographs were taken in a flat that all three were living in together. According to James, the reason for tracks remaining untitled was due to his synesthesia. Rather than trying to affix tracks with titles, James would opt to identify each composition with colour instead; this was reflected within the artwork.

While most of the tracks were officially untitled, unofficial titles created by fan Greg Eden were adapted and are widely used today. These fan titles were derived from the photography seen throughout the record. Eden simply "wrote what the pictures looked like" with little hesitation, i.e., all within a few minutes, and no additional contemplation. Eden would later go on to work for Warp Records in 1995, before leaving in 2005.

The front cover of Volume II was the result of James scratching the Aphex Twin logo onto the back of a leather travel case using a razor and a compass, which Sam photographed. Nicholson said that the pie charts and size of the photographs that represented each track in the artwork corresponded to their duration. The timecodes of a track would be converted into a decimal, then into the percentage of the total length of the side of the record the track is on, and then into a degree to be used on the pie chart.

Discussing the artwork for Bandcamp Daily, Andy Beta described the cover of the album as unfamiliar and alien, and compared the sepia tones seen within the cover art to it being affected by solar radiation exposure. Beta described the blurry and unfocused nature of the photography and compared the pictures to them being taken on a "distant planet". Philip Sherburne of Pitchfork called the logo on the cover a relic from "some strange future-past", and compared the cover to markings that had been "discovered on some weathered desert pyramid". He also discussed the mysterious nature of the photography seen throughout the album.

== Release ==
Warp released Selected Ambient Works Volume II on double CD, double cassette and triple LP on 7 March 1994 in the United Kingdom, followed by 12 April on double CD through Sire in Australia, Japan and the United States. The 19th track is omitted from all versions of the original release's CD pressings due to space limitations. It entered the CIN's Dance Albums Chart at No. 1 and remained in the top five for six weeks. It entered the Albums Chart at No. 11. By July 1994 the album had sold more than 60,000 copies outside the United States.

Before its release on Volume II, the track "Blue Calx" had been featured on a 1992 compilation titled The Philosophy of Sound and Machine, published by Rephlex Records. An original version of track 2 ("Radiator") with added percussion was released as a part of 26 Mixes for Cash, under the title of "SAW2 CD1 TRK2, Original Mix". The track was later officially named "Radiator (Original Mix)" within Peel Session 2.

On 6 March 2012 Selected Ambient Works Volume II was reissued on vinyl by record label 1972 Records. The master for this release was made from a US CD copy however, which omitted both the 4th and 19th tracks. James added the album to his own web store in 2017 with a 26th track, "th1 [evnslower]", and the 19th track, which was its first digital availability since its inclusion on the 1994 ambient music CD compilation Excursions in Ambience: The Third Dimension.

=== Expanded edition ===
In June 2024 Warp announced an expanded edition of the album on digital, triple CD, 4xLP and double cassette formats, remastered by Matt Colton. A 4xLP deluxe boxset came in a hinged oak case topped with an etched copper plate and accompanied by a booklet of design sketches. The cassettes were originally released as type II chrome cassettes, which were limited to 250 total copies.

In September 2024, James released "th1 [evnslower]" for streaming platforms. It had previously appeared in James's SoundCloud archive in 2015, and on the digital rerelease on James's Website. The composition of "th1 [evnslower]" was described as both slow and dark. On the same day of the release, Warp Records and James announced that listening parties for Selected Ambient Works Volume II (Expanded Edition) would take place at record shops across the United States, Canada, United Kingdom and Ireland. After the success of the chrome cassettes, Warp began production of a cassette variant made with ferric tape instead. In October 2024, James released the single "#3 / Rhubarb Orc. 19.53 Rev" onto streaming platforms.

On 4 October 2024, Selected Ambient Works Volume II (Expanded Edition) was officially released and included both bonus tracks and the previously excluded 19th track. James dedicated the re-release to his mother, Lorna, who had died in 2022. Another listening party took place at the Tate Modern in late October.

== Reception ==
Professional ratings
Review scores
Source	Rating
Entertainment Weekly	C
Rolling Stone	4/5 stars
Select	4/5
The Village Voice	B−

Volume II received mixed reviews from critics upon release. Spin gave the album a positive review, with critic Simon Reynolds acknowledging the album's "euphoric" and "majestically melancholy" tracks, but also describing the album's eerie aspect and that it could leave listeners "spooked out". Rolling Stone's Jon Wiederhorn wrote about how artists similar to James in sound had been producing music that lacked emotion akin to elevator music, while James was able to use the ambient genre to explore "spooky, textured sound" and to confront his "shadowy demons". Wiederhorn concluded that the album played a significant part in the evolution of ambient electronic music. Clark Collis of Select pointed out how listeners expecting an album in the style of Selected Ambient Works 85–92 would be surprised due to Volume II's beatless structure. Collis noted the album did not give into typical conventions of electronica, but worked well as an ambient album and was a record that required attention from the listener.

Other reviews were less favourable. Robert Christgau, writing in The Village Voice, negatively expressed how James's music was incomparable to that of Brian Eno, Jon Hassell or Harold Budd and commented on the lack of richness in Volume II's composition. Entertainment Weekly critic Charles Aaron stated that Volume II resembled an avant-garde soundtrack to a "postapocalyptic" piece of theater, similar to the compositions of Philip Glass. However, Aaron also wrote about how the album often times contained "chamber music for humorless cyber-nerds".

Selected Ambient Works Volume II was discussed by David Toop in 1995's Ocean of Sound: Aether Talk, Ambient Sound and Imaginary Worlds. Toop called the album a "serene, disembodied, episodic collection", and compared the album to an auditory equivalent of "a photo album filled with Polaroids of sunsets and seascapes". Mark Prendergast's The Ambient Century on the history of ambient music, said that Volume II managed to remain enjoyable and exciting throughout.

== Legacy ==
=== Retrospective reviews ===
Professional ratings
Retrospective reviews
Review scores
Source	Rating
AllMusic	4/5 stars
The Encyclopedia of Popular Music	3/5 stars
Tom Hull - on the Web	B
Pitchfork	10/10
Q	4/5 stars
Resident Advisor	5/5
The Rolling Stone Album Guide	3/5 stars
Spin Alternative Record Guide	8/10

At the end of the decade Selected Ambient Works Volume II was included on several publications' lists of top albums of the 1990s, including Rolling Stone and Spin. Hyperreal.org, a rave culture site which hosted an influential IDM mailing list, conducted polls that ranked the all-time ambient records; Volume II was placed as the first in 1996, and the second in 2001. Commenting on the audience's reaction of the album in 1999, Simon Reynolds stated that many fans of James were confused by Volume II, and that fans continually divided in discussion about the album. David Fricke, Rob Sheffield and Ann Powers of Rolling Stone stated that James had created a perfect soundtrack for recuperating after a loud night at a club, and that it was a dance album that focused on rhythm within one's head. Within the Spin Alternative Record Guide, Simon Reynolds gave Volume II a positive review, acknowledging that while the album wasn't as engaging as Selected Ambient Works 85–92, it was still as impressive. Reynolds also stated that the tracks within Volume II had a "petrified and petrifying beauty". Philip Sherburne of Pitchfork gave the album a 10/10, discussing the album's long-term influence on electronica and stating how it "changed ambient music forever". Q gave the album 4/5 stars, discussing how James doubled down on his enigmatic persona with the release of Volume II.

Spin and Pitchfork both placed the album in their lists of the 1990s best albums; Pitchfork placed Volume II at number 62, while Spin placed Volume II and its previous volume both at number 56, calling it "an awe-inspiring feat of avant-techno texturology". Alex Linhardt of Pitchfork discussed how Volume II was responsible for one of the great trajectories of pop music in the 1990s, influencing the sound of artists such as Radiohead, notably for their album Kid A, and Timbaland. It was later ranked second on the website's 2016 list of the best ambient music albums, after Brian Eno's Ambient 1: Music for Airports. Carlos Hawthorn of Resident Advisor gave the album a 5/5 for its 25th anniversary, writing that Volume II created atmospheres made up of vivid textures and sounds.

Critics such as Tom Hull and Sasha Frere-Jones criticised the repetitive nature of the composition of tracks within the album. Frere-Jones wrote about how the album could be beautiful at points, but was generally repetitive throughout. In a biography discussing James in the 2001 edition of the All Music Guide to Electronica, John Bush referred to the album multiple times as a "joke on the electronic community" due to its minimal composition and its difference in sound from Selected Ambient Works 85–92 and On. In the same guide, reviewer Stephen Thomas Erlewine wrote about the album's mysterious and difficult nature for most listeners, while also stating that many would find it fascinating. Marc Weidenbaum discussed how there were continued rumours of Volume II being a joke or prank, and that it was used supposedly to exploit the popularity of Selected Ambient Works 85–92.

=== Influence ===
Mark Richardson of Pitchfork noted that Selected Ambient Works Volume II was "a very early example of a record being anticipated, experienced, and, ultimately, analyzed in minute detail through online communication." Pitchfork noted that the electronic mailing list titled IDM had a profound influence on how the album would be received in the future, noting the community's influence in relation to the album's mysterious non-titles. Weidenbaum noted how the fan titles coined by Greg Eden still see mass use today, with the titles being used within the iTunes store listening for Volume II and being used throughout publications and James's fanbase. Simon Reynolds wrote that the album signalled a shift in techno and ambient music toward a darker sound reminiscent of Brian Eno's notion of "environmental music".

Track 19, unofficially titled "Stone in Focus", became one of the most best known tracks from Volume II. The Guardian ranked the track halfway among James's 20 best songs. Geeta Dayal noted how a YouTube upload of the track had gained a large number of views, as well as thousands of comments that discussed "everything from the vastness of the universe to monoliths and existential despair". Fact ranked the track at 41 in a list of the 50 best songs by James, calling it one of the "most disarming and memorable tracks" from Volume II.

Music from Volume II has been used in various pieces of media, such as in the 2002 documentary film, Devil's Playground. Tracks such as "Cliffs" were used for the intro and outro of the documentary. Reid W. Dunn, known by the alias Wisp, released a selection of remixes of tracks from Volume II in 2004 for the album's tenth anniversary. Weidenbaum discussed how the composition of the "Cliffs" mix in particular was enhanced by "the clanking of what seems to be a manual typewriter". In 2008, the orchestra Alarm Will Sound released a live performance album, Acoustica: Alarm Will Sound Performs Aphex Twin, featuring two tracks from Volume II: "Blue Calx" and "Cliffs".

The album's influence has been observed in the work of musical acts such as Four Tet, Caribou, Kanye West and Radiohead. Several tracks from the album were featured as background music on the late night radio show Blue Jam, created by satirist Chris Morris. The music added to the disturbing nature of some of the sketches.

James drifted from ambient music after Volume II with his subsequent EP Ventolin and other releases. One critic likened James's following album, ...I Care Because You Do, to an "industrial scream" against the "pastoral whisper" of Volume II.

== Track listing ==
All tracks are written by Richard D. James

Selected Ambient Works Volume II track listing
No.	Title	Unofficial title	Length
1.	Untitled	cliffs	7:27
2.	Untitled	radiator	6:34
3.	Untitled	rhubarb (Note: Track 3, "Rhubarb", was officially named within the Expanded Edition liner notes.)	7:44
4.	Untitled ( (Note: Track 4, "Hankie", is omitted from all original US CD pressings and the 2017 vinyl repress. It is present in the 2024 Expanded Edition.))	hankie	4:39
5.	Untitled	grass	8:55
6.	Untitled	mould	3:31
7.	Untitled	curtains	8:51
8.	Untitled	blur	5:08
9.	Untitled	weathered stone	6:54
10.	Untitled	tree	9:58
11.	Untitled	domino	7:18
12.	Untitled	white blur 1	2:43
13.	"Blue Calx"		7:20
14.	Untitled	parallel stripes	8:00
15.	Untitled	shiny metal rods	5:33
16.	Untitled	grey stripe	4:45
17.	Untitled	z twig	2:05
18.	Untitled	windowsill	7:16
19.	Untitled ( (Note: Track 19, "Stone in Focus", is omitted from all original CD pressings due to capacity limits of the format and the 2017 vinyl repress because the masters for the pressing were based on the US CD release. It is present in the 2024 Expanded Edition.))	stone in focus	10:14
20.	Untitled	hexagon	5:58
21.	Untitled	lichen	4:15
22.	Untitled	spots	7:10
23.	Untitled	tassels	7:30
24.	Untitled	white blur 2	11:27
25.	Untitled	matchsticks	5:41
Total length:			166:53

2024 Expanded Edition bonus tracks
No.	Title	Length
26.	"th1 [evnslower]"	11:07
27.	"Rhubarb Orc. 19.53 Rev" ( (Note: "Rhubarb Orc. 19.53 Rev" is a reversed orchestral rendition of track 3, ("Rhubarb").))	6:41
Total length:		184:53

== Personnel ==
Credits adapted from liner notes unless noted.

- Richard D. James – writer, producer, liner notes, photography
- Prototype 21 [Paul Nicholson] – designer
- "Sam" – photography [uncredited]

Expanded Edition credits:

- Marek Moś – conductor, arranger (on "Rhubarb Orc. 19.53 Rev")
- AUKSO Tychy Chamber Orchestra – performer (on "Rhubarb Orc. 19.53 Rev")
- Octava Ensemble – performer (on "Rhubarb Orc. 19.53 Rev")
- Matt Colton – remastering

== Charts ==
Chart performance for Selected Ambient Works Volume II
Chart (1994)	Peak position
UK Albums (Official Charts)	11
UK Dance Albums Chart (CIN)	1

2024 chart performance for Selected Ambient Works Volume II
Chart (2024)	Peak position
Australian Albums (ARIA)	46
Belgian Albums (Ultratop Flanders)	5
Belgian Albums (Ultratop Wallonia)	26
Dutch Albums (Album Top 100)	14
German Albums (Offizielle Top 100)	13
Irish Albums (IRMA)	97
Japanese Albums (Oricon)	37
Japanese Hot Albums (Billboard Japan)	50
Scottish Albums (Official Charts)	7
Swedish Physical Albums (Sverigetopplistan)	14
UK Albums (Official Charts)	21
UK Dance Albums (Official Charts)	1
UK Independent Albums (Official Charts)	5
US Billboard 200	135
US Top Dance Albums (Billboard)	3

== Certifications ==
Certifications for Selected Ambient Works Volume II
Region	Certification	Certified units/sales
United Kingdom (BPI)	Silver	60,000^{‡}
^{‡} Sales+streaming figures based on certification alone.

== Bibliography ==
- Weidenbaum, Marc (2014a). Selected Ambient Works Volume II. 33⅓. London/New York: Bloomsbury Publishing. ISBN 9781623567637. Archived from the original on 30 May 2022.
- Toop, David (1995). Ocean of Sound: Aether Talk, Ambient Sound and Imaginary Worlds. London: Serpent's Tail. ISBN 9781852423827.
- Prendergast, Mark J. (2000). The Ambient Century: From Mahler to Moby – The Evolution of Sound in the Electronic Age. New York: Bloomsbury Publishing. ISBN 978-1-58234-134-7.
