= Drukqs =

Studio album by Aphex Twin
- Released: 22 October 2001
- Genres: Drill 'n' bass; classical; IDM; impressionism; jungle; acid; electroacoustic; ambient
- Length: 100:41
- Label: Warp
- Producer: Aphex Twin

Richard D. James chronology
2 Remixes by AFX (2001)	Drukqs (2001)	26 Mixes for Cash (2003)

Aphex Twin album chronology
Richard D. James Album (1996)	Drukqs (2001)	26 Mixes for Cash (2003)

Drukqs (sometimes styled as drukQs) is a studio album by the British electronic music artist and producer Aphex Twin. It was released on 22 October 2001 through Warp Records. It is a double album that includes a variety of contrasting styles, from meticulously programmed beats inspired by jungle and drum and bass, to classical-style, prepared piano, ambient, and electroacoustic pieces. It features the piano composition "Avril 14th", one of James's best known recordings.

James released Drukqs to pre-empt a potential leak after he accidentally left an MP3 player containing his music on a plane. It was intended to be his final release with Warp, in accordance with his label contract. The record entered the Dance Albums Chart at No. 1, remaining in the top 10 for five weeks, and entered at No. 22 on the Albums Chart. It received polarised reviews from critics: many dismissed it, focusing on its perceived lack of innovation and similarity to James's previous works, while others praised it as an accomplished work.

On 13 November 2026, an expanded edition of Drukqs was released, following the 25th anniversary reissue on Warp Records. It featured five new tracks.

== Background and release ==
James released Drukqs to circumvent a potential leak after he accidentally left an MP3 player containing 180 unreleased tracks on a plane while travelling to Scotland. According to James: "I thought, 'They're gonna fucking come on the internet sooner or later so I may as well get an album out of it first.'" James had no intent to release any of the record's tracks to the public prior to the incident. He intended it to be his final release as part of his contractual obligation to Warp. The album was mastered in early July 2001. It was released as a double CD album on 22 October 2001. The record entered the Dance Albums Chart at No. 1, remaining in the top 10 for five weeks, (Note: Attributed to multiple sources:) and entered at No. 22 on the Albums Chart. In 2015, James released the EP Computer Controlled Acoustic Instruments pt2, featuring further computer-controlled instrumental tracks, as a sequel to Drukqs.

A 25th anniversary edition of the album was reissued in 2026 in vinyl, CD, cassette, and digital formats.

Many track names are written in Cornish—for example, "Jynweythek" ('Machine')—or are coded titles. James has stated that the title is not related to drugs, and is "just a word [he] made up." About the album's two-disc length, James said "the way I listen to music now is that I buy a CD, put it on the computer and just take the tracks I want anyway. I'd hope that people would do the same with this CD." The album is almost entirely instrumental with a few spoken samples, including a momentary shout of "Come on you cunts, let's have some Aphex acid!" A censored version of this line was used as an advertising slogan to promote the album, being sighted stickered on various Central London Underground stations in the weeks before the album's release.

== Music ==
The LP is a double album featuring a variety of styles: rapid, meticulously programmed tracks utilising exaggerated drum 'n' bass breakbeats, ambient, electroacoustic, and piano and prepared piano pieces inspired by classical music made using computer-controlled instruments such as a modified Yamaha Disklavier and several MIDI-controlled, solenoid-based drum mechanisms made by James. Drukqs includes music in the genres of drill 'n' bass, jungle, classical, electroacoustic, acid, drum and bass, techno, IDM and ambient. It contains tracks dating back "seven or eight years", according to James, though most of the album was relatively new. Keymag described it as "switching restlessly from his most acidic drill 'n' bass yet to incredibly lavish prepared piano pieces inspired by John Cage." NME noted that the album moves through techno, drum 'n' bass, and early-90s rave, while the piano interludes were compared to the work of Erik Satie. Pitchfork also noted "several purely electro-acoustic excursions".

James said that "A lot of [the tracks] are quite old-style sounding, I reckon. I've done loads of tracks which are really new in style and which don't sound like anything else but I didn't want to release those tracks." While acknowledging similarities with his records, James said that "I haven't done something in so much detail before." Of the album's complex drum programming, he said "it's quite similar to guitar solos, only with programming you have to use your brain. The most important thing is that it should have some emotional effect on me, rather than just, 'Oh, that's really clever.'"

== Reception ==
Professional ratings
Aggregate scores
Source	Rating
Metacritic	66/100
Review scores
Source	Rating
AllMusic	4.5/5 stars
Alternative Press	8/10
Dotmusic	10/10
The Guardian	2/5 stars
Los Angeles Times	3/4 stars
NME	9/10
Pitchfork	5.5/10 (2001); 9.5/10 (2026)
Playlouder	4.5/5 stars
Q	2/5 stars
Rolling Stone	1/5 stars
The Rolling Stone Album Guide	4/5 stars
Spin	5/10

Drukqs is among James's most divisive releases, with Oli Warwick of Crack noting that it provoked "widespread indignation amongst music critics, whose primary criticism seemed to be that James had delivered something reminiscent of previous releases, rather than some bold new mode of electronic expression." At Metacritic, which assigns a normalised rating out of 100 to reviews from mainstream critics, the album has an average score of 66 based on 21 reviews.

On its 2001 release, Alex Needham of NME called it "beautiful" and "bulging with goodies". The review for Playlouder called it "probably his best album to date". For Spin, Simon Reynolds criticised the album as "unimpressive" and "trapped by the potential for infinitesimal tweakage," stating that it "sounds merely like a slight extension of the Aphex sound circa 1996's Richard D. James Album and 1997's Come to Daddy." Pitchfork described the album's "drill'n'bass" tracks as "throwbacks to the past rather than prospects on the future; and for all of their compositional strength, there's an element of the Aphex Twin mystique missing." Dave Simpson of The Guardian stated that "much of Drukqs sounds like weaker echoes of things Aphex Twin has done before, which no manner of hyperactive drum machines or daft titles can disguise." Pat Blashill of Rolling Stone called Drukqs Aphex's "most irrelevant album to date", and added "rumor has it that James merely loaded this record with outtakes that have been eating up space on his hard drive for years, then released the album as a deal-breaker with his label, Warp." In The Rolling Stone Album Guide (2004), critic Sasha Frere-Jones wrote "weirdly dismissed by many, Drukqs is often spectacular".

The piano composition "Avril 14th" became one of James's most popular tracks, later being used in a Saturday Night Live skit and the Kanye West song "Blame Game". As of April 2017 the track was James's most streamed track on Spotify, with approximately 124 million streams. By this metric, it is his best-known composition. It has also been used in films such as Marie Antoinette (2006).

=== Social media use ===
In 2024, "QKThr" has seen widespread use as a TikTok sound, primarily in relation to the "subtle foreshadowing" trend, where a video's unfortunate ending is slowed down and spliced throughout the video itself. The viral popularity of "QKThr" on TikTok, Instagram Reels, and YouTube Shorts contributed to an increase in the popularity of James's music online; in January 2026, reports noted that Aphex Twin had surpassed Taylor Swift in monthly YouTube Music listeners (448 million vs 399 million monthly listeners), which was largely attributed to the track's use in short-form content. The Guardian described James as having become "the soundtrack to gen Z life online", noting that "QKThr" had been used in nearly eight million TikTok posts, while other tracks from Drukqs, including "Avril 14th" and "Jynweythek", also became widely used in "-core" and aesthetic-edit videos.

== Track listing ==
All songs composed by Richard D. James.

Drukqs track listing
No.	Title	Length
1.	"Jynweythek" (also known as "Jynweythek Ylow")	2:23
2.	"Vordhosbn"	4:51
3.	"Kladfvgbung Micshk"	2:06
4.	"Omgyjya-Switch7"	4:52
5.	"Strotha Tynhe"	2:12
6.	"Gwely Mernans"	5:08
7.	"Bbydhyonchord"	2:33
8.	"Cock/Ver10"	5:18
9.	"Avril 14th"	2:05
10.	"Mt Saint Michel + Saint Michaels Mount"	8:10
11.	"Gwarek2"	6:46
12.	"Orban Eq Trx 4"	1:35
13.	"Aussois"	0:13
14.	"Hy a Scullyas Lyf Adhagrow"	2:14
15.	"Kesson Dalef"	1:21
16.	"54 Cymru Beats"	6:06
17.	"Btoum-Roumada"	1:58
18.	"Lornaderek"	0:31
19.	"QKThr" (also known as "Penty Harmonium")	1:27
20.	"Meltphace 6"	6:24
21.	"Bit 4"	0:25
22.	"Prep Gwarek 3b"	1:19
23.	"Father"	0:57
24.	"Taking Control"	7:14
25.	"Petiatil Cx Htdui"	2:11
26.	"Ruglen Holon"	1:49
27.	"Afx237 v.7"	4:23
28.	"Ziggomatic 17"	8:35
29.	"Beskhu3epnm"	2:10
30.	"Nanou2"	3:25
Total length:		100:41

aphextwin.warp.net/Expanded edition tracks
No.	Title	Length
31.	"dRuQks Prepared uN 1"	3:01
32.	"avril 14th half speed alternative version [re-recorded 2009 Nagra]"	5:07
33.	"avril 14th reversed music not audio [re-recorded 2009 Nagra]" ( (Note: Released on SoundCloud as "avril 14th, notes played backwards, not the audio."))	2:12
34.	"avril 14th doubletempo,half speed"	2:16
35.	"Mangle 11"	5:55
Total length:		119:11

== Personnel ==
- Aphex Twin – music, photographs

== Charts ==
2001 chart performance for Drukqs
Chart (2001)	Peak position
Australian Albums (ARIA)	87
French Albums (SNEP)	43
Irish Albums (IRMA)	14
Norwegian Albums (VG-lista)	36
Scottish Albums (Official Charts)	16
Swedish Albums (Sverigetopplistan)	47
UK Albums (Official Charts)	22
UK Dance Albums (OCC)	1
UK Independent Albums (Official Charts)	2
US Billboard 200	154
US Top Dance Albums (Billboard)	6
US Heatseekers Albums (Billboard)	2

2026 chart performance for Drukqs
Chart (2026)	Peak position
Australian Albums (ARIA)	14
Belgian Albums (Ultratop Flanders)	8
Belgian Albums (Ultratop Wallonia)	37
Dutch Albums (Album Top 100)	36
German Albums (Offizielle Top 100)	9
Irish Albums (IRMA)	75
Irish Independent Albums (IRMA)	9
Japanese Albums (Oricon)	52
Swiss Albums (Schweizer Hitparade)	47

== Certifications ==
Certifications for Drukqs
Region	Certification	Certified units/sales
United Kingdom (BPI)	Silver	60,000^{‡}
^{‡} Sales+streaming figures based on certification alone.
