= Neurotech =

Slovenian industrial metal band

- Origin: Ljubljana, Slovenia
- Genres: Industrial, industrial metal, cyber metal, electronic, symphonic metal
- Years active: 2007–2017, 2020–present
- Members: Wulf (Andrej Vovk)
- Past members: Luka Čadež; Siph; Naur; Sophis

Neurotech is a Slovenian one-man industrial/electronic music project based in Ljubljana, known for its stylistic blend of electronics and metal.

== History ==
Formed by multi-instrumentalist/vocalist Wulf (real name: Andrej Vovk) in 2007, Neurotech started off as a full band with a heavier sound than their later albums in their debut EP Transhuman, released in 2008, and their debut album Antagonist, released in 2011, both stylistically compared to Sybreed and melodic death metal bands Disarmonia Mundi and Insomnium. Those two releases were followed by a string of EPs; Blue Screen Planet (2011), Decipher Vol. 1, Decipher Vol. 2 (2012), Decipher Vol. 3 (then-unreleased), and The Elysian Symphony (2013). The Decipher volumes were compiled in an album titled The Decipher Volumes, released in 2013. Several singles were released from those albums including "Inject Me Now" from Antagonist on 27 December 2010, "Unconditional" (featuring Tanja Ravljen) from Decipher Vol. 2 on 25 June 2012, and "Triumph" from Decipher Vol. 3 on 22 April 2013. "The Elysian Symphony" was released on 25 December 2013, a 17-minute instrumental composition which "combines several musical genres into a coherent whole. A unique mixture of metal, orchestral, electronic and ambient music." A six-year anniversary re-recording of the title track for the Transhuman EP was released on 15 January 2014.

A solo project at this point, Wulf started working on his next Neurotech album in February 2014. "Unleashing the Dead" was released as a single on 27 September 2014 and serves as a sneak preview for the album Infra Versus Ultra. The album was released on 27 October 2014. Infra Versus Ultra has been given a more mixed reception, due to the tracks alternating between symphonic/industrial metal and "acid euro-dance electronica." The album was followed up by another single, "The Halcyon Symphony", released on 25 December 2014.

The project's next album Stigma was released on 8 June 2015. The song "Of Adversity" was released in advance on 22 May 2015. The album was followed by Evasive, an instrumental electronic album, released on 13 November 2015. Several singles from the album were released in the two weeks before its release, including "I Desensitize" on 2 November, "Maelstrom" on 4 November, and "The Resurface" and "Compass" on 7 November 2015.

After releasing two albums in 2016, In Remission and Symphonies (the latter compiling the four "Symphony" singles released so far), another album, The Catalyst, was released on 23 June 2017, announced as Wulf's final album under the Neurotech moniker at the time. In 2018, Wulf started a different project focused on trance music, NeuroWulf. In 2020, Wulf reformed Neurotech and released two singles for a new album; "Waking Silence" on 28 December 2020 and "Light Betides" on 5 March 2021. The album Solace was released on 18 March 2021. The album has received slightly more positive feedback despite the metal elements being considered "undeveloped".

A new single, "The Messianic Symphony" was released on 20 December 2021, to be part of the project's next album Symphonies II, released on 4 March 2022, which consists of four "symphony" tracks in a similar vein to the first Symphonies album, with each track lasting exactly 10 minutes in length. It was followed up by another single from the album, "The Draconic Symphony", released on 7 January 2022. Symphonies II has been given a better review as the album has been noted to solve most of the issues pointed out in Solace. The album was followed by Ave Neptune released on 21 April 2023. The song "Mundane Entropy" was released in advance on 28 March 2023. The next album Memory Eternal was released on 15 March 2024. The song "Invictus" was released in advance on 1 March 2024. The next album Exo Escapism was released on 30 May 2025, with its single "Cast Into Shadow" released in advance. On 10 April 2026, two new songs, "Anomaly" and "In Delta Negative" were released, as part of the new album In Delta Negative, released on 15 May.

== Musical style ==
Neurotech and its albums have been described as a variety of genres including industrial, industrial metal, cyber metal, electronic, symphonic metal, pop metal, melodic death metal, and electronic metal. It has been noted in a review that the project "encompasses cyber metal, industrial, ebm, ambient, experimental, new age, trance, futurepop, and symphonic that confounds expectation at every turn."

== Members ==
Current

- Wulf (Andrej Vovk) – vocals, guitars, programming, keyboards, synths, piano, orchestrations (2007–present), drum programming (2009–present), bass (2012–present)

Former

- Luka Čadež – drums (2007–2008)
- Naur – bass (2007–2012)
- Sophis – guitars (2007–2012)
- Siph – drums (2008–2009)

== Discography ==
=== Studio albums ===
- Antagonist (20 March 2011)
- The Decipher Volumes (EP compilation) (23 June 2013)
- Infra Versus Ultra (27 October 2014)
- Stigma (8 June 2015)
- Evasive (13 November 2015)
- In Remission (6 June 2016)
- Symphonies (27 December 2016)
- The Catalyst (23 June 2017)
- Solace (18 March 2021)
- Symphonies II (4 March 2022)
- Ave Neptune (21 April 2023)
- Memory Eternal (15 March 2024)
- Exo Escapism (30 May 2025)
- In Delta Negative (15 May 2026)

=== EPs ===
- Transhuman (15 January 2008)
- Blue Screen Planet (11 December 2011)
- Decipher Vol. 1 (22 April 2012)
- Decipher Vol. 2 (30 September 2012)
- Decipher Vol. 3 (2013)
- Unreleased Demos (2011–2016) (compilation EP) (4 September 2020)

=== Singles ===
- "The Angst Zeit" (2009)
- "Unconditional" (25 June 2012)
- "Triumph" (21 April 2013)
- "The Elysian Symphony" (25 December 2013)
- "Unleashing the Dead" (27 September 2014)
- "The Halcyon Symphony" (25 December 2014)
- "Of Adversity" (22 May 2015)
- "I Desensitize" (2 November 2015)
- "Maelstrom" (4 November 2015)
- "The Resurface" (7 November 2015)
- "Compass" (7 November 2015)
- "The Ophidian Symphony" (25 December 2015)
- "Waking Silence" (24 December 2020)
- "Light Betides" (3 March 2021)
- "Deceive" (Solace B-side) (18 May 2021)
- "The Messianic Symphony" (9 December 2021)
- "The Draconic Symphony" (7 January 2022)
- "The Seraphic Symphony" (3 February 2022)
- "The Prophetic Symphony" (4 March 2022)
- "Below These Scars (Tenth Anniversary Remix)" (23 June 2023)

=== Boxed set ===
- A Decade of Futurism (November 2017)

Contains remastered editions of all albums and EPs released by Neurotech up to that point: Transhuman, Antagonist, Blue Screen Planet, The Decipher Volumes, Infra Versus Ultra, Stigma, Evasive, In Remission, Symphonies, and The Catalyst.
