= On (EP) =

EP by Aphex Twin
- Released: 15 November 1993
- Recorded: 1993
- Length: 23:54
- Label: Warp
- Producer: Aphex Twin

Richard D. James chronology
Joyrex J9ii (1993)	On (1993)	Selected Ambient Works Volume II (1994)

Professional ratings
Review scores
Source	Rating
AllMusic	3/5 stars

On is an extended play record by the electronic music producer Aphex Twin released on 15 November 1993 by Warp. On Remixes, featuring remixes by James, Reload and μ-Ziq, was released on the same day.

The record entered the Dance Singles Chart at number 3 on 27 November. It also peaked at number 32 on the main Singles Chart.

== Track listing ==
All tracks are written by Richard D. James.

No.	Title	Length
1.	"On"	7:03
2.	"73-Yips"	4:14
3.	"D-Scape"	6:54
4.	"Xepha"	5:42
Total length:		23:54

The Sire Records (US) version of On contains only "On", "73-Yips", and "Xepha" with early fade-outs, followed by the Reload Mix of "On", and it is housed in an Ecopak case instead of the standard slimline jewel case in which the Warp (UK) release was packaged.

On Remixes
No.	Title	Length
1.	"On" (D-Scape Mix)	10:40
2.	"On" (Reload Mix)	7:06
3.	"On" (μ-Ziq Mix)	8:43
4.	"On" (28 Mix)	6:47
Total length:		33:16

The "D-Scape Mix", in actuality a remix of "D-Scape" from On, features mostly harsh sucking noises.

== Production ==
In the 2015 SoundCloud dump, James states that he produced some of the sounds in "Xepha" by modifying a DAT player to play back tapes that he purposefully damaged. He claims that he created distorted sounds by stretching tapes, spraying them with hair spray, as well as changing the playback speed of the motor.

== Music video ==
The music video for the title track was directed by Jarvis Cocker and Martin Wallace, and features a stop-motion sequence filmed on a beach involving numerous props (including an old fashioned diving suit and a cardboard cutout of James), and images of the tide. Drips of water are synchronized with the piano. The film was shot on location in Hilbre Island, West Kirby, Wirral, UK. James was hands-off from the video's making, apart from insisting that it did not feature any computer graphics. He was however satisfied with the result, stating that it "does the job". It is available on the Come to Viddy (VHS, 1997) and WarpVision: The Videos 1989–2004 (DVD, 2004) compilations.
