= Blame Game =

2010 song by Kanye West

Song by Kanye West featuring John Legend and Chris Rock

from the album My Beautiful Dark Twisted Fantasy
- Released: November 22, 2010
- Recorded: 2010
- Genre: Hip hop; R&B; spoken word
- Length: 7:49
- Label: Roc-A-Fella; Def Jam
- Songwriters: Kanye West; Justin Franks; Chloe Mitchell; Mike Dean; John Stephens; Richard D. James
- Producers: Kanye West; DJ Frank E; Mike Dean

"Blame Game" is a song by American hip-hop recording artist Kanye West from his fifth studio album, My Beautiful Dark Twisted Fantasy (2010). The song features recording artist John Legend and was produced by West, DJ Frank E, and Mike Dean. The song features a hip hop skit provided by comedian Chris Rock. It uses the piano composition "Avril 14th" by Aphex Twin. Lyrically, the song contains West's thoughts on past break-ups and explores themes of unrequited love, heartbreak, and spousal abuse. Midway through the song, Rock delivers an extended monologue as the new boyfriend of West's past lover.

Critics were generally complimentary and praised Legend's vocal delivery. The appearance by Rock was widely noted as a surprising element of the song and received mixed criticism, though some critics described it as a highlight. It charted on the South Korean Gaon Chart at position 81. West and Legend performed "Blame Game" together on Vevo Presents GOOD Music at SXSW. The song was featured in West's 2010 short film Runaway. West planned to produce a music video for the song featuring Amber Rose but she declined and West scrapped the video.

== Background ==
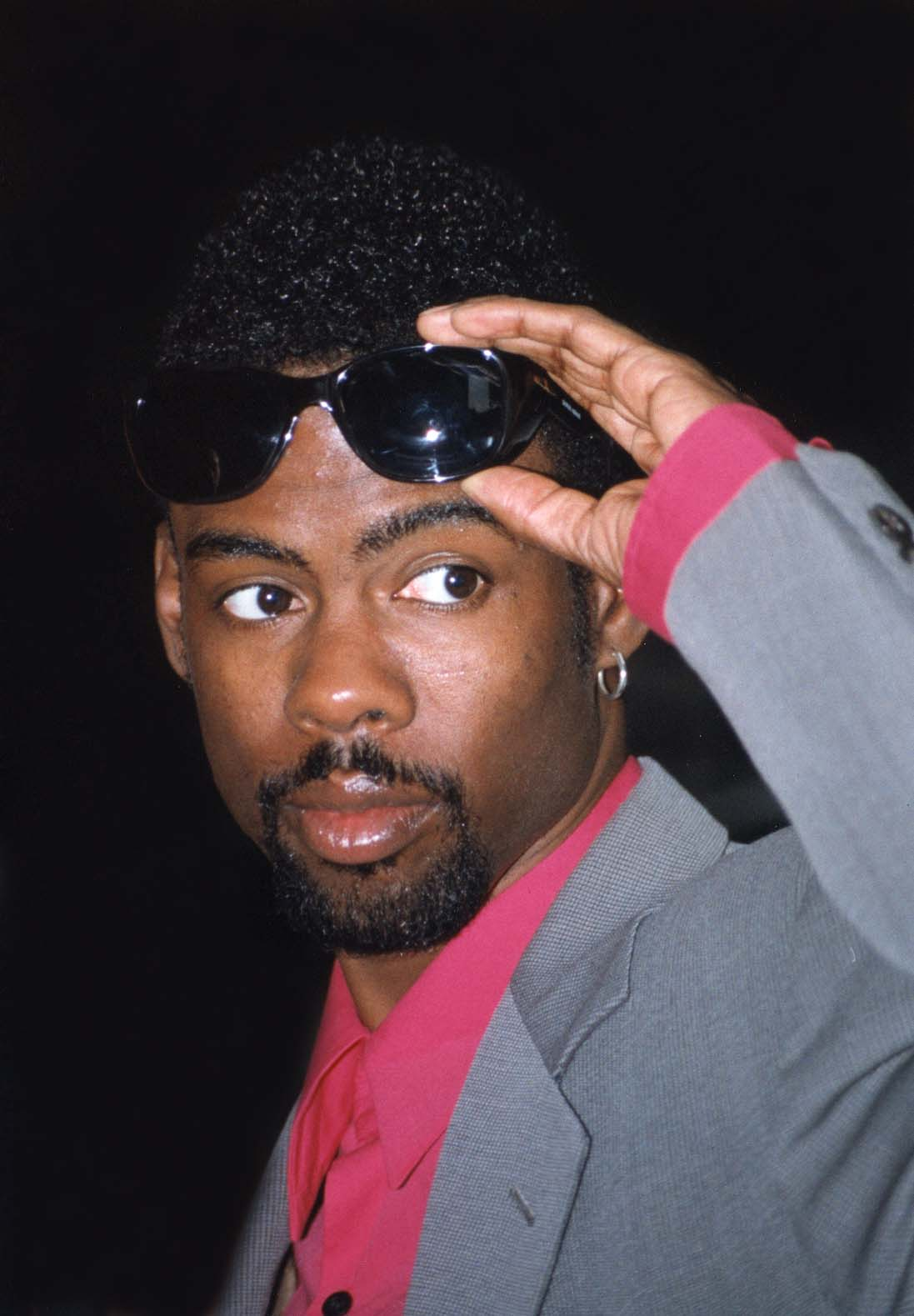
West asked comedian Chris Rock to appear on the song.

"Blame Game" was recorded in Oahu, Hawaii, where most of the sessions for My Beautiful Dark Twisted Fantasy took place. West opted to work with more familiar songwriters to maintain artistic privacy and keep a low profile after several of his publicized controversies. West recorded the song with vocalist John Legend, a frequent collaborator of his since West's 2004 debut album The College Dropout. During an appearance on Ustream, West announced that Legend was set to appear on a song from his currently upcoming album, titled "Blame Game". During the announcement, West cited "Blame Game" as his favorite song from the album, which was at the time unfinished. The song developed from Legend and West's brainstorming, which also led to several other tracks, including "All of the Lights".

West asked comedian Chris Rock to appear on the song. Rock, a fan of West's, mused that he was more than happy to collaborate with West, and said, "you'd be amazed at how many people want to work with you if you just ask, if you just make a call." He had previously collaborated on other hip hop songs, such as with rappers Ludacris, Ol' Dirty Bastard, and Ice Cube on the track "You Ain't Gotta Lie (Ta Kick It)". Rock described his collaboration with West as exciting in nature, commenting that he was always open to working on unusual ventures. In an interview with The New York Times, Rock went into detail about the composition of the song:

I did that quicker than I read scripts that they offer me money to do ... I thank [Kanye] so much it probably freaks him out. Especially at this late date, to get on something, the album of the moment, that stuff is priceless, you can't put a price tag on that. I felt invigorated by it. I've still got my fastball.

The song is partly inspired by West's relationship with model Amber Rose. West originally met Rose in 2008, and they subsequently developed a romantic relationship, before having a dramatic break-up in 2010; Rose cited allegations of adultery. Rose also said that West had written the song about their relationship, commenting that West "talked reckless about me on his album".

"Blame Game" uses the composition "Avril 14th" by Aphex Twin (Richard D. James). According to James, after he was sent an early version of "Blame Game" with a heavily timestretched sample of "Avril 14th", he offered to rerecord the piece at a different tempo; West's team replied with "It's not yours, it's ours, and we're not even asking you any more", and tried to avoid paying for its use. The final "Blame Game" may have used a rerecorded version of "Avril 14th" rather than a sample, and James received credit.

The use of the Aphex Twin sample may have been inspired by a song for the SNL Digital Short 'Iran So Far'. The song first aired in episode 625, September 29, 2007, during Saturday Night Live season 33, in which West was the musical guest and also appeared in a sketch co-written by Akiva Schaffer of The Lonely Island. In a 2024 episode of The Lonely Island and Seth Myers Podcast, Schaffer argued that "'Blame Game'" is the exact same basic beat of ‘Iran So Far,’ and Jorma Taccone, who produced the track, agrees that "I think I influenced Kanye.”

== Composition ==
"Blame Game"
A sample featuring West repeatedly confessing "I can't love you this much" over the soulful, cello-driven production.

"Blame Game" is built on the piano composition "Avril 14th" by Aphex Twin. The song begins with a minute long introduction sung by Legend. "Blame Game" has a lush, cello-driven production with predominant piano. After Legend's introduction, West raps his verses in a highly melodic manner, almost singing his lines. West's forceful delivery expresses hurt and contempt. The song's soulful sound juxtaposes West's angry lyrics: "been a long time since I spoke to you in a bathroom, ripping you up, fuckin' and chokin' you". He subsequently raps less antagonistically and repeatedly confesses "I can't love you this much".

West's vocals are substantially manipulated throughout the song from "naturally clear-sounding and ominously pitched-down as it pans back and forth", as they are slowed down, sped up, edited substantially, and altered in various ways, giving the song a brooding, ominous mood. Pitchfork writer Ryan Dombal wrote that this effect "bottoms out with a verse in which Kanye's voice is sped up, slowed down and stretched out ... The effect is almost psychotic, suggesting three or four inner monologues fighting over smashed emotions." AbsolutePunk's Drew Beringer commented that the vocal altercations gives the sense of the "multiple personalities and paranoia he tries to overcome."

On "Blame Game", West attempts to call his past lover, but he receives a call back instead and he hears a conversation between her and Chris Rock, who begins an extended monologue approximately five minutes into the song. Chris Rock performs a vulgar, profanity-ridden sketch in which he compliments his lover's dress sense and sexual technique, and asks her who taught her these skills. Each time he asks, the answer is the same: "Yeezy taught me." Rock proceeds to thank 'Yeezy', stating that he will support him by buying the album and threatens to 'shoot a bootlegger'. Rock finishes the skit by telling West's past lover that "Yeezy taught you well". Andy Gill of The Independent commented that a similar "alliance of aristocratic piano and cello with less rarefied elements underpins 'Blame Game', a brutal rumination on West's sexual appetite".

== Promotion ==
The song was also featured in Runaway, a 35-minute music video directed by West set to music from My Beautiful Dark Twisted Fantasy. After a traumatic dinner sequence, the song is played during a tense moment between West and the phoenix. At the Vevo Presents GOOD Music musical presentation, the song was performed by both West and Legend together. The two performed a few songs together before Legend performed his own single "Ordinary People" separately.

A planned music video for the song was going to feature an appearance by Amber Rose, however she declined the offer. Rose commented that she passed on the video because she "just felt like Chris Rock's part was disrespectful", believing that the song painted her in a negative light. Another reason for her declining to appear in the video because of her then-current relationship with rapper Wiz Khalifa, feeling that appearing in an ex-boyfriend's musical venture would be disrespectful to Khalifa. West told Rose that both "Blame Game" and the Runaway film were partially inspired by his relationship with her.

== Reception ==
"Blame Game" received mostly positive reviews. The Village Voice's Sean Fennessey said that it is "not the flashiest or most forward-thinking song on the album, but certainly the most earthbound. And therefore the most important." Chicago Sun-Times writer Thomas Conner complimented Rock's "hilarious, X-rated spiel" and cited the song as the best example of West's ability "to contrast the light and dark pieces against each other, the profane and the sacred", writing that it utilizes "Legend's soft, pretty voice to sing a smooth, troubling refrain." Rolling Stone writer Rob Sheffield called it one of the funniest of West's career, a "confessional" song where he "honestly struggles to figure out why he has to be such a douchebag." Steve Jones of USA Today cited the song as the album's pièce de résistance that "plays out with growing hostility over John Legend's moody piano work." Nitsuh Abebe of New York mused that the song successfully showcased a "gloomy and elegiac" presentation.

David Browne of Time called it "that rare, effortless fusion of penthouse-boudoir R&B and hip hop grit", but was ambivalent about its segue "into an interminable, decidedly unfunny skit in which a guy keeps asking a woman how she learned such mind-boggling bedroom moves." In contrast, Kitty Empire of The Guardian felt that "comedian Chris Rock is hilariously foul-mouthed at the end of Blame Game." Becky Bain of Idolator called the song epic, but felt that Rock's appearance served as a detriment to the song, writing; "we'd kill the last two minutes with Rock's unfocused, not-as-funny-as-we-think-it's-supposed-to-be rambling, but otherwise, this is quite a beautiful track." "Blame Game" charted on South Korean Gaon Chart at position 81.

== Personnel ==
Credits adapted from liner notes for My Beautiful Dark Twisted Fantasy (2010).

- Kanye West – composer, producer, primary artist
- John Legend – composer, featured artist
- Chris Rock – additional vocals
- Mike Dean – additional production, bass, composer, mixing, piano
- DJ Frank E – composer, producer
- Richard D. James – composer (sample)
- Salma Kenas – additional vocals
- Chloe Mitchell – composer (poem)
- Chris "Hitchcock" Chorney – cello
- Andrew Dawson – engineer, mixing
- Ryan Gilligan – engineer
- Phil Joy – engineer
- Anthony Kilhoffer – mixing

== Charts ==
Chart (2011)	Peak position
South Korean Gaon Chart	81
