= Blackbox Life Recorder 21f / In a Room7 F760 =

EP by Aphex Twin
- Released: 28 July 2023
- Genre: Electronic
- Length: 14:30
- Label: Warp
- Producer: Richard D. James

Aphex Twin chronology
Collapse EP (2018)	Blackbox Life Recorder 21f / In a Room7 F760 (2023)	Barcelona 16.06.2023 (2023)

Singles from Blackbox Life Recorder 21f / In a Room7 F760
- 1. "Blackbox Life Recorder 21f" Released: 21 June 2023

Blackbox Life Recorder 21f / In a Room7 F760 is an extended play record by the British electronic music artist Aphex Twin. It was released on 28 July 2023 on Warp. It was preceded by the release of the first track and single "Blackbox Life Recorder 21f" on 21 June 2023. The EP contains four tracks, including an alternate "Parallax mix" of "Blackbox Life Recorder 21f" as the final track.

== Background ==
The EP was first teased during Aphex Twin's performance at Sonar 2023, as well as on posters with QR codes littered throughout Los Angeles on 20 June 2023, which when scanned brought fans to an app called YXBoZXh0d2lu, which played Aphex Twin's music over visuals. The EP was announced alongside the release of the single "Blackbox Life Recorder 21f" on 21 June 2023.

== Critical reception ==
Professional ratings
Aggregate scores
Source	Rating
Metacritic	79/100
Review scores
Source	Rating
AllMusic	3.5/5 stars
The Arts Desk	4/5 stars
Beats Per Minute	75%
Exclaim!	8/10
Pitchfork	7.4/10
Tom Hull - on the Web	B+

Blackbox Life Recorder 21f / In a Room7 F760 received a score of 79 out of 100 on review aggregator Metacritic based on eight reviews, indicating "generally favorable" reception. Guy Oddy of The Arts Desk wrote that the EP "stays within James' long marked-out territory of electronic uneasy listening but remains inventive and innovative", noting the "cinematic drone" of "Blackbox Life Recorder 21f", the "ambient breakbeat" of "Zin2 Test5", the "livelier and more beat-heavy" sound of "In a Room7 F760", and the Parallax mix of "Blackbox" for being "particularly claustrophobic with a grubby atmosphere". Paul Simpson of AllMusic remarked that "while it felt like the veteran musician was pushing his sound forward on Collapse, here he's essentially in his comfort zone" and the EP "isn't a game changer, but it bears enough of Aphex Twin's unmistakable personality to be worthwhile".

Pitchfork's Philip Sherburne stated that the EP "might seem relatively modest" but described its tracks as "big, bruising, and percussion-forward" and found that they share "a certain inscrutable mood". Daryl Keating of Exclaim! called it "solid tungsten all the way through" and wrote that it "sounds simply fantastic". Keating characterised "Blackbox Life Recorder 21f" as "an absolute masterclass in percussion" and the other three tracks "pure oddball IDM".

Todd Gilchrist of Variety called the EP "disappointingly slight [...] yet its arrival is a comfort, offering sounds that will ring familiar to longtime fans — and to everyone else serve as an atmospheric Rorschach test, alternately primitive and futuristic, beautiful and menacing, propulsive and ethereal". John Doran of The Quietus found that "as well as a return of a certain kind of melodic sensibility to his music", that "three of the tracks feel like the living embodiment of a very large house with a huge variety of rooms" and "that there are several tracks' worth of musical ideas hidden in these [tracks'] abyssal depths".

== Track listing ==
Blackbox Life Recorder 21f / In a Room7 F760 track listing
No.	Title	Length
1.	"Blackbox Life Recorder 21f"	4:26
2.	"Zin2 Test5"	2:39
3.	"In a Room7 F760"	3:53
4.	"Blackbox Life Recorder 22" (Parallax mix)	3:32
Total length:		14:30

On release day, four extra tracks were uploaded onto the Aphex Twin store with the note "BBLR [driven harder] Exact same 4 trax but processed/mastered differently by afx with specialist analogue h/w [sic]". On August 3rd, another track "M12 6 omc zeq" was uploaded.

aphextwin.warp.net exclusive tracks
No.	Title	Length
5.	"Blackbox Life Recorder 21f 760 omc"	4:31
6.	"Zin2 Test5 omc ma2"	2:39
7.	"In a Room7 F760 omc s"	3:50
8.	"Blackbox Life Recorder 22 Parallax mix 760 omc ma2"	3:33
9.	"M12 6 omc zeq"	5:59
Total length:		35:02

On 19 November 2024, two bonus tracks originating from stems of the title track were uploaded onto streaming services and James' own store.

November 2024 bonus tracks
No.	Title	Length
10.	"Blackbox Life Recorder 20 [Ambient 760]"	6:04
11.	"Blackbox Life Recorder 21 [drumreesapella 760]"	4:23
Total length:		45:29

== Charts ==
Chart performance for Blackbox Life Recorder 21f / In a Room7 F760
Chart (2023)	Peak position
Japanese Albums (Oricon)	38
Japanese Digital Albums (Oricon)	31
Japanese Hot Albums (Billboard Japan)	32
Swiss Albums (Schweizer Hitparade)	90
