= Brian Behlendorf =

American computer programmer and executive (born 1973)

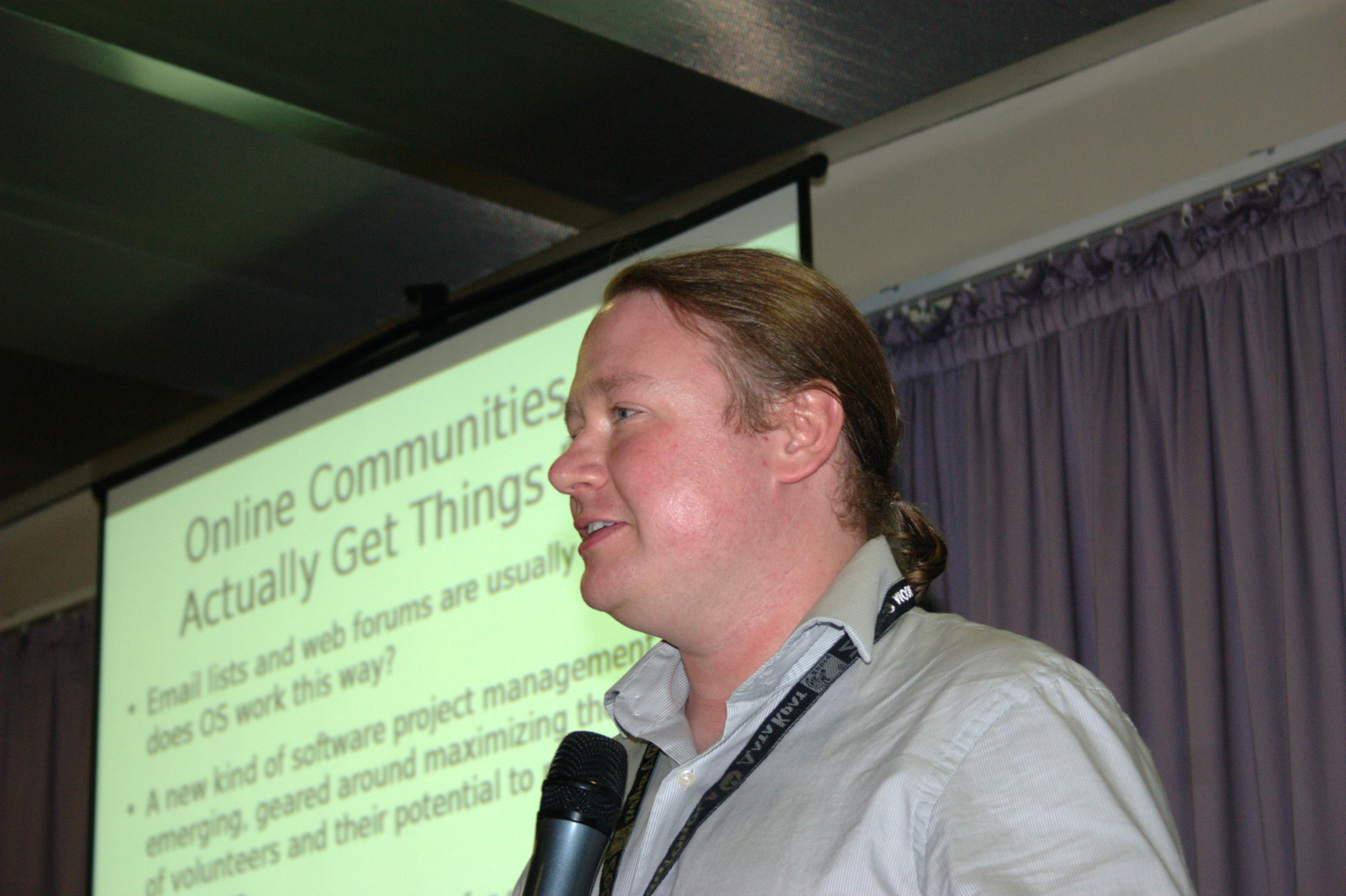
- Brian Behlendorf in Moscow, 2007
- Born: March 30, 1973 (age 53)
- Education: University of California, Berkeley
- Employer: Open Source Security Foundation
- Known for: Apache HTTP server
- Title: Chief Technology Officer
- Website: brian.behlendorf.com

Brian Behlendorf (born March 30, 1973) is an American technologist, executive, computer programmer and leading figure in the open-source software movement. He was a primary developer of the Apache Web server, the most popular web server software on the Internet, and a founding member of the Apache Group, which later became the Apache Software Foundation. Behlendorf served as president of the foundation for three years. He has served on the board of the Mozilla Foundation since 2003, Benetech since 2009, and the Electronic Frontier Foundation since 2013. Behlendorf served as the General Manager of the Open Source Security Foundation (OpenSSF) from 2021 to 2023 and is currently the Chief Technology Officer of the OpenSSF.

== Career ==
Behlendorf, raised in Southern California, became interested in the development of the Internet while he was a student at the University of California, Berkeley, in the early 1990s. One of his first projects was an electronic mailing list and online music resource, SFRaves, which a friend persuaded him to start in 1992. This would soon develop into the Hyperreal.org website, an online resource devoted to electronic music and related subcultures.

In 1993, Behlendorf, Jonathan Nelson, Matthew Nelson and Cliff Skolnick co-founded Organic, Inc., the first business dedicated to building commercial web sites. While developing the first online, for-profit, media project—the HotWired web site for Wired magazine—in 1994, they realized that the most commonly used web server software at the time (developed at the National Center for Supercomputing Applications at the University of Illinois at Urbana-Champaign) could not handle the user registration system that the company required. So, Behlendorf patched the open-source code to support HotWired's requirements.

It turned out that Behlendorf wasn't the only one busy patching the NCSA code at the time, so he and Skolnick put together an electronic mailing list to coordinate the work of the other programmers. By the end of February 1995, eight core contributors to the project started Apache as a fork of the NCSA codebase. Working loosely together, they eventually rewrote the entire original program as the Apache HTTP Server. In 1999, the project incorporated as the Apache Software Foundation. Behlendorf served as president of the Foundation for three years.

Behlendorf was the CTO of the World Economic Forum. He is also a former director and CTO of CollabNet, a company he co-founded with O'Reilly & Associates (now O'Reilly Media) in 1999 to develop tools for enabling collaborative distributed software development. CollabNet used to be the primary corporate sponsor of the open source version control system Subversion, before it became a project of the Apache Software Foundation. He continues to be involved with electronic music community events such as Chillits, and speaks often at open-source conferences worldwide.

In 2003, he was named to the MIT Technology Review TR100 as one of the top 100 innovators in the world under the age of 35.

Behlendorf has served on the board of the Mozilla Foundation since 2003, Benetech since 2009 and the Electronic Frontier Foundation since 2013. He was a managing director at Peter Thiel's Mithril Capital, a global technology investment firm based in San Francisco, from 2014 until he joined the Linux Foundation. In 2016, he was appointed executive director of the open source Hyperledger project at the Linux Foundation to advance blockchain technology.

Behlendorf became the General Manager of the Open Source Security Foundation in October 2021. The appointment was shared publicly at KubeCon, along with the announcement of $10m in investments to secure open source supply chains.
