= Organic, Inc. =

American advertising agency

- Founded: 1993
- Founder: Jonathan Nelson, Brian Behlendorf, Cliff Skolnick, Matthew Nelson
- Fate: Subsidiary of Omnicom (2003)
- Headquarters: New York City
- Website: organic.com

Organic, Inc. is a digitally-led advertising agency that is a member of DAS Group of Companies, a division of Omnicom Group Inc.

In addition to its headquarters in New York City, Organic, Inc. has established offices in Detroit and Los Angeles, expanding its presence to key markets across the United States.

== History ==
Organic was one of the original digital agencies, and was founded in 1993 by Jonathan Nelson, Brian Behlendorf, Cliff Skolnick and Matthew Nelson.

The firm completed an IPO in February 2000 under the ticker OGNC. Due to the economic effects of the Dot-com bubble, Organic was re-privatized in 2001, and became a subsidiary of Omnicom in 2003.
