= London 19.08.2023 =

EP by Aphex Twin
- Released: 19 August 2023
- Genre: Electronic; techno
- Length: 15:41
- Label: Warp
- Producer: Richard D. James

Aphex Twin chronology
Barcelona 16.06.2023 (2023)	London 19.08.2023 (2023)	Bristol 02.09.23 (2023)

London 19.08.2023 is an extended play by the electronic music artist and producer Richard D. James, released under the alias of Aphex Twin. It was released on 19 August 2023 through Warp, to coincide with James' performance at the Field Day 2023 festival. The EP was released only as a vinyl record. Both songs on side A were previously released on James' Bleep store, under the name "Korg Trax+Tunings for falling asleep", which was credited to the alias AFX.

== Background ==
On 24 January 2023 it was announced that James would be a headliner for the Field Day 2023 festival. This was James' first performance after a five year hiatus from both live performances and music releases. James was scheduled to perform on 19 August 2023. As the festival started and the merchandise stall opened, it was revealed that a screen printed version of the record would be sold only at Field Day, which was limited to 100 copies. However, attendees could also purchase a card with a redemption code on it if they did not wish to carry the record with them. Records that were purchased with these code cards carried a non-screen printed cover, with 450 of these being available.

== Release ==
Both versions of the record were priced at £5 and were sold out extremely quickly, before James had even started his performance. After the festival ended, many fans were outraged due to the presence of scalpers purchasing the record and reselling it on online marketplaces for large amounts. They were able to do this as the venue had no limits on how many records an attendee could purchase.

On 2 September 2023, as a part of James' performance at Forwards Festival in Bristol, London 19.08.2023's track list was combined onto a limited cassette tape, Bristol 02.09.23. This cassette was limited to 500 copies and also included another limited release's track list, Barcelona 16.06.2023. This release included two songs and was only available at Sónar 2023, where James had previously played.

On 28 November 2023, three months after Field Day 2023, Warp announced that London 19.08.2023 along with other Aphex Twin merchandise would be sold in limited amounts through James' Bleep store. All of the merchandise including the record sold out quickly after the announcement.

On 17 December 2024 the tracks of London 19.08.2023 were re-released onto streaming platforms as part of a new compilation album, Music from the Merch Desk (2016–2023).

== Track listing ==
All tracks written by Richard D. James.

Side one
No.	Title	Length
1.	"Korg funk5"	3:22
2.	"Korg 1B RU,EC,E"	3:03
Total length:		6:25

Side two
No.	Title	Length
3.	"Soog E"	3:30
4.	"Body Pads"	2:52
5.	"Dgitne Tst1e"	2:54
Total length:		9:16
