= Aphex Twin =

British electronic musician (born 1971)

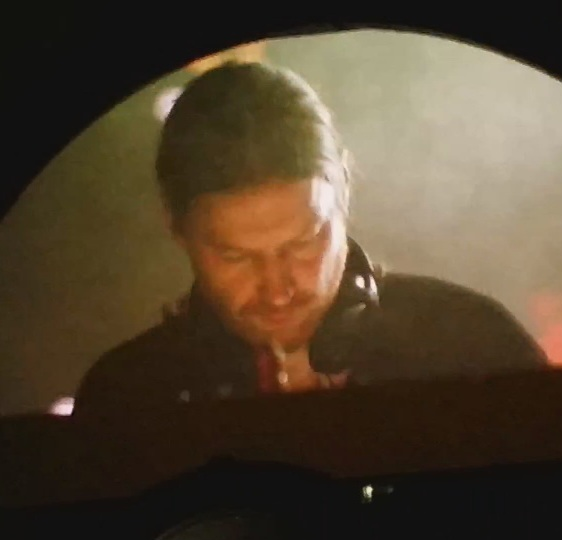
- James performing in Houston Texas on December 17, 2016
- Born: Richard David James; 18 August 1971 (age 55); Limerick, Ireland
- Musical career
- Also known as: AFX; Caustic Window; Polygon Window; The Tuss; Bradley Strider; Phonic Boy on Dope; Karen/Brian Tregaskin; Power-Pill; The Aphex Twin
- Origin: Cornwall, England
- Genres: Electronic; techno; acid; ambient; IDM; jungle; experimental; drill 'n' bass
- Occupations: Musician; record producer; composer; DJ
- Instruments: Synthesiser; piano; turntables; drum machine; sequencer; sampler; laptop
- Works: Discography; compositions
- Years active: 1988–present
- Labels: Warp; Rephlex; Apollo; R&S
- Formerly of: Universal Indicator
- Website: aphextwin.warp.net

Richard David James (born 18 August 1971), known professionally as Aphex Twin, (Note: James has recorded under a wide number of lesser known aliases, including AFX, Caustic Window, Polygon Window, and the Tuss.) is a British musician, composer and DJ active in electronic music since 1988. His idiosyncratic work has drawn on many styles, including techno, ambient, acid, and jungle, and he is closely associated with the intelligent dance music genre. (Note: James has dismissed the IDM label as "nasty," and his label Rephlex Records coined the alternate term "braindance," though IDM became the more widely-known term.) Journalists from publications including Mixmag, The New York Times, NME, Fact, Clash and The Guardian have called James one of the most influential and important artists in contemporary electronic music.

James was raised in Cornwall and began DJing at free parties and clubs around the South West in the late 1980s. His debut EP Analogue Bubblebath, released in 1991 on Mighty Force Records, brought James an early following; he began to perform across the UK and continental Europe. James co-founded the independent label Rephlex Records the same year. His 1992 debut album Selected Ambient Works 85–92, released by Belgian label Apollo, garnered wider critical and popular acclaim. James signed to Warp in late 1992 and subsequently released a sequel, Selected Ambient Works Volume II, the Richard D. James Album (1996), and Top 40 singles such as "Come to Daddy" (1997) and "Windowlicker" (1999); the latter two were accompanied by music videos directed by Chris Cunningham and brought James wider international attention.

After releasing Drukqs in 2001 and completing his contract with Warp, James spent several years releasing music on his own Rephlex label, including the 2005 Analord EP series under his AFX alias and a pair of 2007 releases as the Tuss. In 2014 he made available a previously unreleased 1994 LP as Caustic Window. He returned later that year with the Aphex Twin album Syro on Warp, winning the Grammy Award for Best Dance/Electronic Album. He has since released charting EPs including Cheetah (2016) and Collapse (2018). His 2023 single "Blackbox Life Recorder 21f" was nominated for the Grammy Award for Best Dance/Electronic Recording. Since 2015 he has been sporadically releasing music on SoundCloud.

== Early life ==
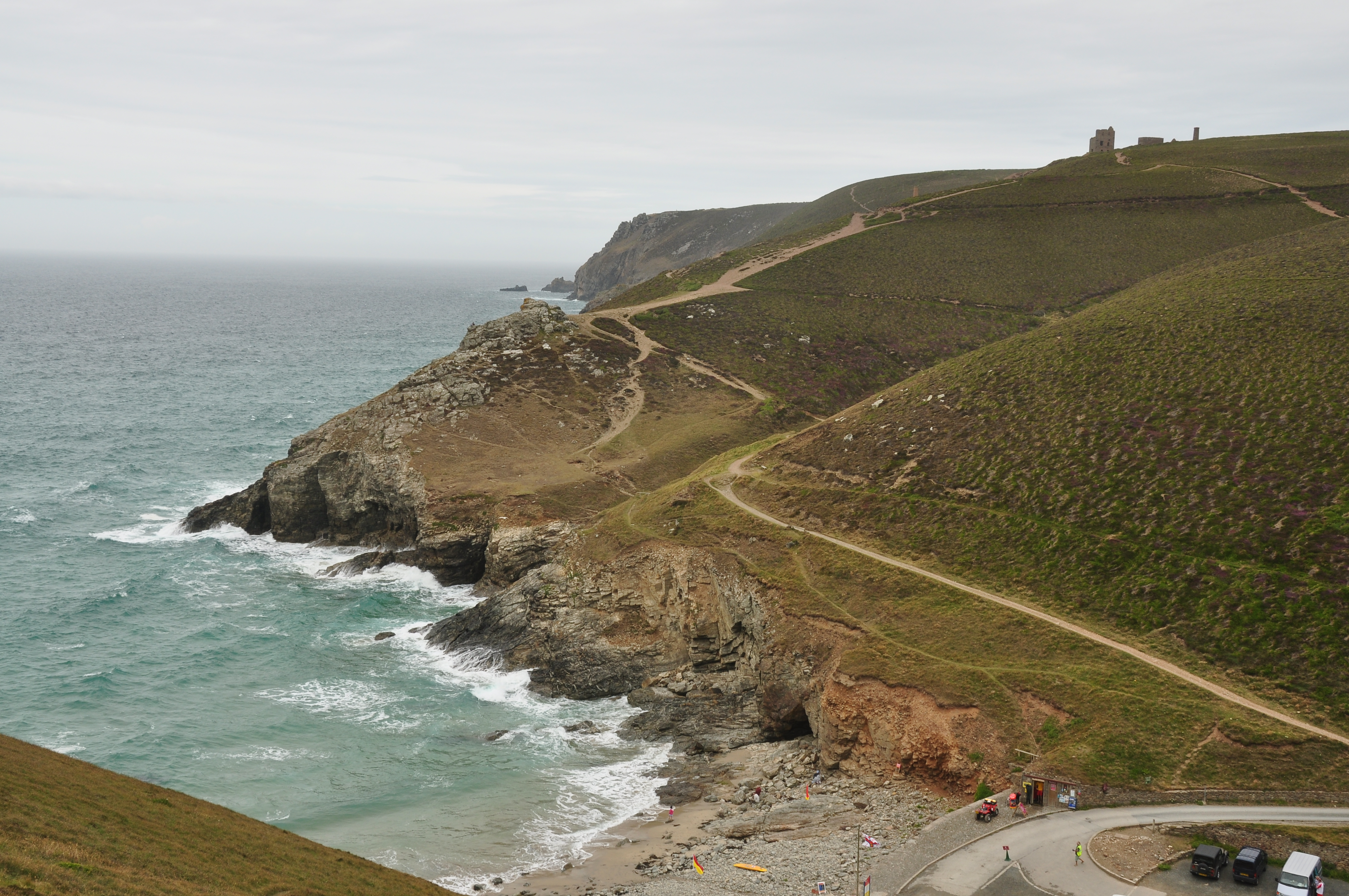
James grew up in Cornwall; Chapel Porth appeared on the cover of his 1993 Polygon Window album Surfing on Sine Waves and is referenced in its liner notes.

James was born on 18 August 1971 in Limerick, Ireland, to Welsh parents. He has said that he had a stillborn older brother, also named Richard, and was later given the same name. In a 1997 interview, James said his brother had died in Canada in 1968, where his parents had moved for his father's mining work, and that his mother kept the name because she could not accept the death.

James was raised in Cornwall, living in Lanner and attending Redruth School in Redruth. He later described Cornwall as isolated from cities, a quality he said he enjoyed. Before writing music, he became interested in making sounds: as a child he played with the strings inside the family piano, experimented with tape recorders, and later began modifying electronic equipment.

In a 2001 interview, James said that when he was 11 he won £50 in a competition for producing sound on a Sinclair ZX81, a home computer with no dedicated sound hardware. Fact questioned this story in 2017, citing a similar program published in Your Computer Magazine in 1982 under the name G. N. Owen, for which the author was paid £6.

James bought his first synthesizer at age 12 and began making music at age 14. Cornwall had few record shops, but acid house was popular in its nightlife; James later said he had been making music similar to acid and techno before encountering the genres and then sought out records in those styles. He studied at Cornwall College from 1988 to 1990, graduating with a National Diploma in engineering. One of his lecturers recalled that James often wore headphones during practical lessons and already had a "kind of mystique" among other students.

== Career ==
=== 1988–1991: Cornish free parties, Rephlex Records and first releases ===
In the late 1980s James became involved in the Cornish free party scene, putting on raves at "secret coves along the coast and behind sand dunes". The first party he DJed at was in a barn in 1988. Parties were also known to take place at Gwennap Pit. They mainly attracted local youths and travellers, with entrance donations taken in cannabis. The community also held events at small clubs in towns around the county, including St. Ives, Porthtowan, and St Austell. James later referred to this scene as the "best he's ever been involved in".

James started a regular DJ slot in 1989, playing alternate weeks at the Bowgie nightclub in Crantock. There he met Tom Middleton and Grant Wilson-Claridge. James incorporated his own tracks, recorded on tape, into his DJ sets. Impressed by James's music, Middleton played a tape James had given him to a free party organiser in Exeter, Mark Darby, who eventually convinced James to release a record on his fledgling record label Mighty Force Records. James was initially resistant, but while he was tripping on acid backstage at a DJ gig, Darby and Middleton convinced him to release the record. Darby later said: "I think if he had not done that trip that night there may have never been any Aphex Twin." James has given a similar account: "...they made me sign the contract when I was off my face. I was tripping and they're waving this money and a pen at me. It's a bit clichéd but it's the way they got me to sign." Similarly impressed by James's music, Wilson-Claridge suggested they use some money he inherited to create a record label to release it. He and James founded Rephlex Records in 1991.

James's first release was the 12" EP Analogue Bubblebath, released on Mighty Force in September 1991. The EP made the playlist of Kiss FM, an influential London radio station, giving it wide exposure in the dance music scene. In 2015 The Guardian called the release one of the key moments in the history of dance music. The record caught the ear of Renaat Vandepapeliere, the head of R&S Records, at that time one of the leading European rave labels. James visited him in Belgium, bringing a box full of cassettes of his music. From these cassettes they picked out tracks for two records, including James's first album Selected Ambient Works 85-92.

In 1992, as word of his 12" records spread, James started performing at London techno events like the formative club Knowledge, held at the SW1 nightclub in London's Victoria, and the influential night Lost.

Through 1991 and 1992 James released three Analogue Bubblebath EPs, two EPs as Caustic Window, the Red EP as part of the Universal Indicator collective, along with the Digeridoo and Xylem Tube EPs on the R&S label. Although he moved to London to take an electronics course at Kingston Polytechnic, he admitted to David Toop that his electronics studies were slipping away as he pursued a career in electronic music.

=== 1992–1994: Selected Ambient Works and early success ===
The first full-length Aphex Twin album, Selected Ambient Works 85–92, comprised material dating to James's teen years. It was released in November 1992 by Apollo Records, a subsidiary of Belgian label R&S. John Bush of Allmusic later described it as a watershed moment in ambient music. In a 2002 Rolling Stone record review Pat Blashill wrote that Aphex Twin had "expanded way beyond the ambient music of Brian Eno by fusing lush soundscapes with oceanic beats and bass lines," demonstrating that "techno could be more than druggy dance music". Writing for Pitchfork in 2002, David Pecoraro called it "among the most interesting music ever created with a keyboard and a computer". DJ Mag's Ben Murphy named it "a seminal record in the IDM, ambient and experimental canon".

In 1992 James also released the EPs Digeridoo and Xylem Tube EP as Aphex Twin, the Pac-Man EP (an album of remixes of Pac-Man music) as Power-Pill, two of his four Joyrex EPs (Joyrex J4 EP and Joyrex J5 EP) as Caustic Window, and Analogue Bubblebath 3. "Digeridoo" reached No. 55 on the UK Singles Chart, and was later described by Rolling Stone as foreshadowing drum and bass. That year, he also appeared as the Dice Man on the Warp Records compilation Artificial Intelligence with the track "Polygon Window". The compilation helped create the genre later known as "intelligent dance music", and helped launch James's career alongside Autechre and Richie Hawtin. As Polygon Window, in 1993, James released his first records on Warp: Surfing on Sine Waves (the second in the Artificial Intelligence series) and the EP Quoth. Later that year he released the EP On, which entered the top 40 on the UK chart. Rephlex also released an EP by James under the alias Bradley Strider, Bradley's Robot, and two more Caustic Window records.

James was part of several tours in 1993. He supported the Orb on several dates, and joined the "Midi Circus" tour at venues across the UK, co-headlining with Orbital, the Orb, and Drum Club. Later in the year, he was part of the NASA "See the Light" tour with Orbital, Moby, and Vapourspace at venues across the United States. In 1993, James also formed a duo with Mike Dred called Universal Indicator and released two albums within the year, Blue and Red.

Warp released the second Aphex Twin album, Selected Ambient Works Volume II, in March 1994. It explored a more ambient sound, inspired by lucid dreams and James's experience of synaesthesia. It reached number 11 in the UK chart, but was not particularly well received critically; critic Simon Reynolds later noted that "many in the Aphex cult were thrown for a loop" and that "Aphex aficionados remain divided". Other 1994 releases were a fourth Analogue Bubblebath, GAK (derived from early demos sent to Warp), and Classics a compilation album.

=== 1995–2000: ...I Care Because You Do, Richard D. James Album and Come to Daddy ===
Aphex Twin in an interview in 1995

For his charting 1995 album ...I Care Because You Do, composed between 1990 and 1994 in a range of styles, James used a self-portrait of his face for the cover, which became a motif on his later releases. He commissioned Western classical-music composer Philip Glass to create an orchestral version of the ...I Care Because You Do track "Icct Hedral", which appeared on the Donkey Rhubarb EP. In the same year, James released his Hangable Auto Bulb EP under the name AFX, which spearheaded the short-lived drill 'n' bass style. This rapid, computer-based drum programming became the dominant approach of James's work through the end of the decade. In 1996, James and Michael Paradinas (μ-Ziq) collaborated for the album Expert Knob Twiddlers under the one-off side project Mike & Rich, which was released by James' Rephlex label.

Richard D. James Album, James's fourth studio album as Aphex Twin, was released on Warp in 1996. It features software synthesisers and unconventional rhythms. Will Hermes of Spin discussed James's use of jungle elements, writing that "by applying junglist strategies to his own obsessive sound creation - his gorgeous weirdo palette of modernist strings, whirring crib toys, and agitated machines - he remakes drum'n'bass in his own image". In a Pitchfork list of the best albums of the 1990s, Eric Carr wrote that Richard D. James Album demonstrated "aggressive combinations of disparate electronic forms", with an "almost-brutal contrast between its elements" that has ensured its relevance. In 2003 NME named it the 55th greatest album of all time, and in 2009 Pitchfork named it the 40th greatest album of the 1990s.

James garnered attention the following year after the release of his charting Come to Daddy EP. The title track was conceived as a death metal parody. Accompanied with a successful music video directed by Chris Cunningham, James became disenchanted by its success: "This little idea that I had, which was a joke, turned into something huge. It wasn't right at all." It was followed by "Windowlicker", a charting single promoted with another Cunningham music video, nominated for the Brit Award for Best British Video in 2000.

=== 2001–2009: Drukqs, Analord and the Tuss ===
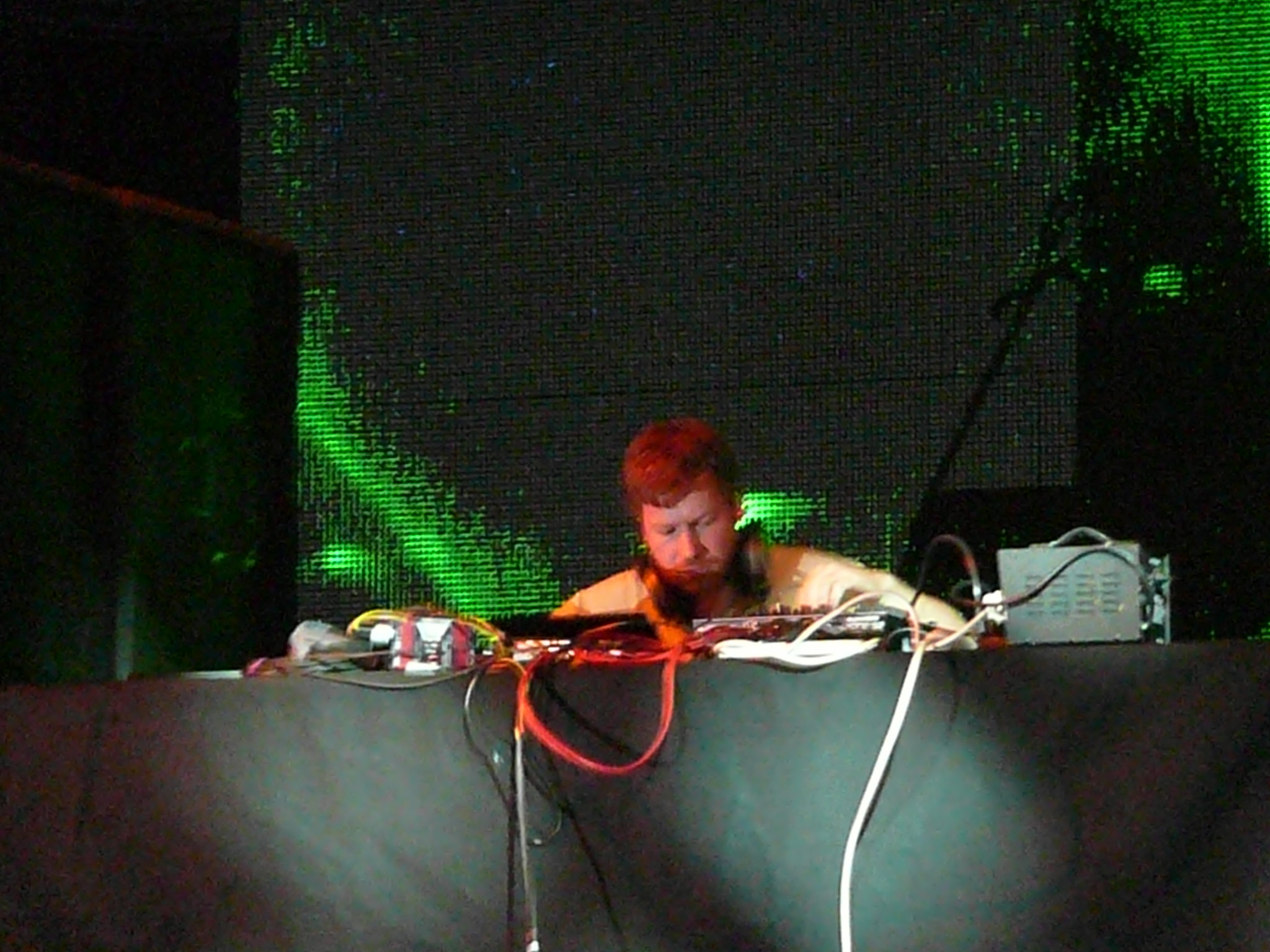
James performing in 2008

In 2001 Aphex Twin released Drukqs, an experimental double album featuring abrasive, meticulous programming and computer-controlled piano influenced by Erik Satie and John Cage. It features the piano composition "Avril 14th", which remains perhaps James' best known work. The album polarised reviewers. James told interviewers he had accidentally left an MP3 player with new tracks on a plane, and had rushed the album release to preempt an internet leak.

In 2001 James also released a short EP, 2 Remixes By AFX, with remixes of songs by 808 State and DJ Pierre. It also had an untitled third track, consisting of a SSTV image with high-pitched sounds which can be decoded to a viewable image with appropriate software. In 2002 James was nominated for the Brit Award for Best British Male. In 2003 Warp released 26 Mixes for Cash, collecting many of James's remixes for other artists.

In 2005 James released a series of vinyl EPs under the AFX name, Analord, created entirely with analogue equipment. These were followed in 2006 by a compilation album of Analord tracks, Chosen Lords. In 2007 James released two records on Rephlex, Confederation Trough and Rushup Edge, under the alias the Tuss, Cornish slang for "erection". Media sources speculated about James's involvement, but his identity was not confirmed until 2014.

In 2009 Rephlex Records released digital versions (in the FLAC file format) of the 11 Analord EPs. Each of them (except for Analord 10) had bonus tracks, totalling 81 minutes of new music between them all. Richard later disbanded Rephlex Records and gave up on the website.

This same year, James began working with the visual artist Weirdcore for graphics for his live shows, debuting at Bloc Festival in Minehead. Weirdcore has continued to work with James on live graphics and music videos.

In 2010 James said he had completed six new albums, including a new version of the unreleased Melodies from Mars. In September 2011 he performed a live tribute to the Polish composer Krzysztof Penderecki; he performed his remix of Penderecki's "Threnody to the Victims of Hiroshima" and a version of "Polymorphia". The following month, he performed at the Paris Pitchfork Music Festival.

=== 2014–present: Caustic Window, Syro, and return as Aphex Twin ===
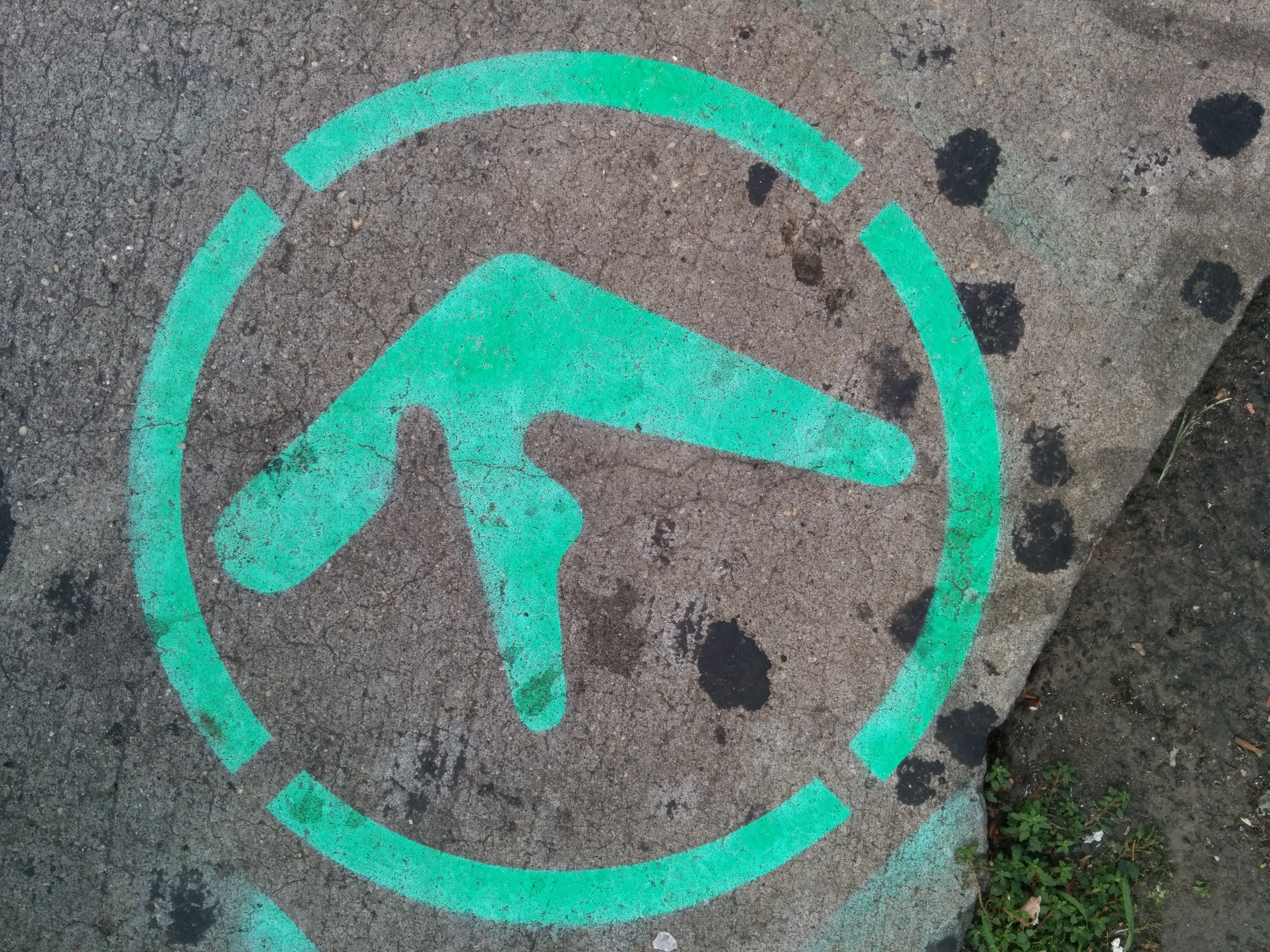
Street art promoting the Syro album in New York City.

In 2014 a test pressing of a 1994 album recorded under James's pseudonym Caustic Window appeared for sale on Discogs. The album was once intended for sale on James's label Rephlex, but went unreleased. With the consent of James and Rephlex, fans organised a Kickstarter campaign to purchase the record and distribute copies.

Syro, the first album released under the Aphex Twin name since Drukqs in 2001, was released through Warp on 23 September 2014. It was marketed by a teaser campaign including graffiti, a blimp flown over London, and an announcement made via a .onion address accessible through the darknet browser Tor.

In November 2014 James released a set of 21 tracks, Modular Trax, on the audio platform SoundCloud. The tracks were later removed. Over several months in 2015 James anonymously uploaded 230 demo tracks, some dating to the 1980s, to SoundCloud. He said he had released the demos to relieve his family of the pressure to release his archives after he dies. He has continued to occasionally release tracks on the account.

On 23 January 2015 James released Computer Controlled Acoustic Instruments pt2, created with robotic instruments including the Disklavier, a computer-controlled player piano. On 8 July 2016 he released the Cheetah EP, backed by a music video for "CIRKLON3 [Колхозная mix]", the first official music video for an Aphex Twin track in 17 years. On 17 December, James performed in Houston, Texas at the Day for Night festival, his first American appearance in eight years. A 12-inch vinyl was sold exclusively at the festival, containing two 10-minute tracks, entitled Houston, TX 12.17.16 [Day For Night]. On 3 June 2017 James performed at the Field Day festival and released a limited edition EP, London 03.06.17. The performance was livestreamed on NTS Radio's Youtube channel. On 19 June 2017 a Michigan record store sold an exclusive Aphex Twin record comprising two tracks released on SoundCloud in 2015, entitled 3 Gerald Remix / 24 TSIM 2. On 27 July, Aphex Twin opened an online store with expanded versions of previous albums and new tracks. On 29 July, at the Fuji Rock Festival, a tape limited to 500 copies was released.

Aphex Twin released an EP, Collapse, on 14 September 2018. The EP was announced on 5 August in a garbled press release written in broken English and visually distorted with the same Aphex Twin 3D graphic found in London, Turin, and Hollywood. A promotional video for the Collapse EP was to be broadcast on Adult Swim, but was cancelled after failing the Harding test. It was made available online instead, and the video for "T69 Collapse" was uploaded to YouTube.

During James' September 2019 tour two 12-inch records were released at performances at Printworks, London, and Warehouse Project, Manchester, entitled "London" and "Manchester" on James' warp.net site. Official recordings of the sets were released on 15 September and 26 December 2019 on Youtube.

Speculations of James's return started after a mysterious website featuring the Aphex Twin logo inside of the word "London" was discovered by fans. Its title alluded to 19 August 2023, the same day that the Field Day festival takes place on in London, teasing a possible performance. His return was confirmed on 24 January 2023, when Aphex Twin was announced as a headliner for the festival. Over the next few weeks, several other performances were announced for Europe. At a performance at Sónar on 16 June, an exclusive 12-inch vinyl was released entitled Barcelona 16.06.23. During this festival, large QR code displays with Aphex Twin branding were spotted. This, coupled with posters found in Los Angeles, led to the discovery of an augmented reality app named YXBoZXh0d2lu. It was created to tease James' upcoming EP. On 21 June James announced the EP Blackbox Life Recorder 21f / In a Room7 F760, which was released on 28 July 2023.

After the release of the EP, the app was updated again. Using the app to scan the front cover, inner sleeves, trifold insert, and vinyl label of Blackbox Life Recorder 21f / In a Room7 F760 reveals a variety of artwork and visuals, such as a 3D version of the cover, and makes the EP's songs playable in the app. On 19 August, James performed at Field Day and released another exclusive vinyl EP, London 19.08.2023. NTS Radio released a 360-degree video recording of the set on 27 August. On 2 September, at a performance at Forwards Bristol, a cassette combining the Barcelona and London releases was released, Bristol 02.09.23.

On 18 June 2024, James announced an expanded edition of Selected Ambient Works Volume II would be released later in the year. The re-issue was confirmed to be releasing on digital, triple CD, 4xLP standard and box set editions and double cassette formats. This re-issue included two bonus tracks, "th1 [evnslower]" and "Rhubarb Orc. 19.53 Rev", as well as the 19th track being released on all formats. The tracks were gradually released onto streaming platforms, with "No. 19" releasing on the day of the announcement, "th1 [evnslower]" releasing on 4 September 2024 and "Rhubarb Orc. 19.53 Rev" being released on 2 October 2024. Selected Ambient Works Volume II (Expanded Edition) officially released on 4 October 2024.

On 17 December 2024 a compilation album featuring a variety of music exclusively released during James' live performances was released without announcement, titled Music from the Merch Desk (2016–2023).

== Musical style and influences ==
Writing for AllMusic, John Bush describes James as a "pioneer of experimental techno" who has "constantly pushed the limits of what can be accomplished with electronic equipment, resulting in forward-thinking and emotionally engaging work that ranges from sublime, pastoral ambience to manic head-rush acid techno". In a 1996 review, The Independent's Angela Lewis called him a "maverick of 1990s electronica [who] exemplifies the finest traditions of British pop mischief". According to Fact magazine, James has "carved out his own space in the history of electronic music" across several genres, with his unique melodies being "the reason he's talked about as not just an electronic innovator but as the sphere's definitive artist". In 2014 review in the Financial Times, Ludovic Hunter-Tilney described James as a "musical maverick" noted for "yoking different elements together in unpredictable formulations" and blending "hard beats and uncanny tones; difficult abstraction and populist melodies". Music publications have described James variously as "the Mozart of" both techno and ambient. Writing in The Guardian in 2001 Paul Lester identified James's lineage as "electronic greats" including Karlheinz Stockhausen, John Cage, Kraftwerk, Brian Eno, and Derrick May.

I could just lock myself away for days and get inspired by myself. That's my favorite way to do it. It's more like a pure form of motivation when it's all on your own. But you have to wait until you're really bored and you've got nothing to do. That's when it comes out. That's when I reckon it gets good.

— James in a 1997 interview with Perfect Sound Forever.

James has no formal music training and is largely self-taught. Prior to becoming a producer, James spent his teens modifying analogue synthesisers and became "addicted to making noises," only later becoming "interested in listening to other people's stuff". James states that he spent his initial years "ignorant of music, apart from acid and techno, where I bought just about everything". He said he had been independently making music similar to acid and techno before encountering the styles, and subsequently became enthusiastic about them. He has cited 808 State's 1988 debut album Newbuild as a major early inspiration. In a 1993 interview, James identified voluntary sleep deprivation as an influence on his productions at that time. He also said he had recorded more than one thousand unreleased tracks. He later said he experienced synaesthesia and used lucid dreaming to develop compositional ideas. James's early work was compared to the ambient music of Brian Eno, but James said he had not heard Eno before he began recording.

In a 1993 interview, Simon Reynolds noted that James had only recently explored avant-classical and left-field rock artists including Cage, Stockhausen, Eno, Steve Reich, Terry Riley, and Can, and had spent a couple of years "catching up" on other genres outside techno and house. In 1997 James described himself as a fan of "old tape and avant-garde music" such as Stockhausen's "Song for the Youth" and the work of the American composer Tod Dockstader. He also named works by Erik Satie, Drexciya, Ween, Serge Gainsbourg, and Les Baxter among his favourite albums. When James began programming faster, jungle-inspired breakbeats in the mid-1990s, he named friends and fellow musicians Luke Vibert and Tom Jenkinson as influences. In a 2014 interview, James said of jungle that "I still think it's the ultimate genre, really, because the people making it weren't musicians," and noted that "for years, I could listen to jungle and nick things from them, but they didn't know I existed." Along with Vibert and Jenkinson, James helped to spearhead the short-lived drill 'n' bass style, which exaggerated elements of drum and bass, on his Hangable Auto Bulb EP (1995). Acknowledging another influence, James's Rephlex label released Music from the BBC Radiophonic Workshop, a compilation of music recorded by the pioneers of the BBC Radiophonic Workshop. In 2019 he described Kraftwerk as a major influence. Although he said he disliked "rock and roll", he appreciates Led Zeppelin (as a source of "great breakbeats"), and Pink Floyd (for their psychedelic music). Asked in 2011 about an artist he would like to work with, James named Kate Bush.

Rephlex Records, which James co-owned with Grant Wilson-Claridge, coined the word "braindance" to describe Aphex Twin's music. According to the label: "Braindance is the genre that encompasses the best elements of all genres, e.g. traditional, classical, electronic music, popular, modern, industrial, ambient, hip-hop, electro, house, techno, breakbeat, hardcore, ragga, garage, drum and bass, etc." According to Pitchfork's Paul Cooper braindance "escaped the mind/body binary opposition of electronic music" while retaining its club roots.

James has been characterised as a figurehead of intelligent dance music (IDM). IDM is mentioned on the home page of the IDM mailing list at Hyperreal.org about the music of Aphex Twin and the Artificial Intelligence Series released by Warp Records. The series features James's recordings as Polygon Window and early productions from artists including Autechre, Black Dog, Richie Hawtin's FUSE project, and Speedy J. The term spread to the United States and internet message boards. James responded to the IDM term in a 1997 interview:

I just think it's really funny to have terms like that. It's basically saying, "this is intelligent and everything else is stupid." It's really nasty to everyone else's music. (laughs) It makes me laugh, things like that. I don't use names. I just say that I like something or I don't.

== Image and pseudonyms ==
Logo used on several Aphex Twin records, designed by Paul Nicholson in 1991.

James's face, grinning or distorted, is a theme of his album covers, music videos and songs. James said it began as a response to techno producers who concealed their identities:

I did it because the thing in techno you weren't supposed to do was to be recognised and stuff. The sort of unwritten rule was that you can't put your face on the sleeve. It has to be like a circuit board or something. Therefore I put my face on the sleeve. That's why I originally did it. But then I got carried away.

The cover of ...I Care Because You Do features a self-portrait painted by James, and that of Richard D. James Album has a close-up photograph. His face is superimposed on the bodies of other people in the music videos for "Come to Daddy" and "Windowlicker". Near the end of the second track of the "Windowlicker" single (known as "Formula"), a photo of James's face is a steganogram which is revealed as a spectrogram. Another image of James and collaborator Tom Jenkinson is embedded (in SSTV format) with text in the third track of 2 Remixes by AFX, "Bonus High Frequency Sounds".

James has recorded as AFX, Blue Calx, Bradley Strider, Universal Indicator, Caustic Window, GAK, PBoD (Phonic Boy on Dope), Polygon Window, Power-Pill, Q-Chastic, Dice Man, the Tuss, Soit-P.P and user18081971. In a 1997 interview, he said: "There's really no big theory. It's just things that I feel right in doing at the time and I really don't know why. I select songs for certain [names] and I just do it. I don't know what it means." In 2001 he commented on the speculation connected to many anonymous electronic artists: "A lot of people think everything electronic is mine. I get credited for so many things, it's incredible. I'm practically everyone, I reckon—everyone and nobody."

== Influence and legacy ==
Writing in The Guardian in 2001 journalist Paul Lester described James as "the most inventive and influential figure in contemporary electronic music". Rolling Stone described James as a "hugely influential electronic musician whose ambient washes of sound and freakishly twisted beats have gone on to inform artists of all genres." AllMusic's John Bush wrote that "unlike most artists who emerged from the '90s techno scene, James established himself as a genuine personality, known for his cheeky grin and nightmare-inducing music videos as much as his groundbreaking albums and EPs," which helped to "expand his audience from ravers and critics to rock fans, with numerous non-electronic musicians citing him as an inspiration".

In 2001 Thomas Bangalter of Daft Punk cited Aphex Twin (particularly "Windowlicker") as an influence on their 2001 album Discovery. Bangalter said he liked it because "it wasn't a big club beat, but it also wasn't a laid back, quiet one". Other artists to have expressed admiration or cited Aphex Twin as an influence include Steve Reich, Wes Borland of Limp Bizkit, Skrillex, Mike Shinoda of Linkin Park, Red Hot Chili Peppers guitarist John Frusciante, Matty Healy of the 1975, Kevin Parker of Tame Impala, C418, Nick Zammuto of the Books, Grimes and Charli XCX.

James influenced Radiohead's transition to electronic music for their 2000 album Kid A. In 2013, the Radiohead singer, Thom Yorke, said Aphex Twin was his biggest influence: "He burns a heavy shadow ... Aphex opened up another world that didn't involve my fucking electric guitar ... I hated the Britpop thing and what was happening in America, but Aphex was totally beautiful, and he's kind of my age too." In 2002, asked if he would tour with Radiohead, James said "I wouldn't play with them since I don't like them". However, he said in 2011 that his dislike of Radiohead had been exaggerated by the press and that he had contacted Yorke to explain this.

In 2005 Alarm Will Sound released Acoustica: Alarm Will Sound Performs Aphex Twin, featuring acoustic arrangements of James's electronic tracks. The London Sinfonietta performed arrangements of Aphex Twin songs in 2006. The animator David Firth sampled Aphex Twin in his animated series Salad Fingers. In 2012 Fact named Selected Ambient Works 85–92 the best album of the 1990s.

== Personal life ==
James has made "wild and essentially unverifiable claims" about his personal life in interviews. He has described himself as "just some irritating, lying, ginger kid from Cornwall who should have been locked up in some youth detention centre. I just managed to escape and blag it into music." In a 1993 interview, he said he slept two to three hours per night. In the mid-1990s, James bought a disused bank in the Elephant & Castle area of London, where he said he lived in a converted bank vault. He falsely claimed in a 2001 interview to have bought the steel structure in the centre of the Elephant Square roundabout, though this is in fact the Michael Faraday Memorial which houses an electricity substation for the London Underground. In the 1990s, James bought a 1950s Ferret armoured car, complete with a working machine gun, which he said he would drive around Cornwall in lieu of a car.

In a 2010 interview with Fact, James said he was living in Scotland after relocating from London. As of 2014, he lived in a village near Glasgow in Scotland with his two sons from his first marriage and his second wife, Anastasia, a Russian art student. His sister Julie James is a Welsh Labour politician who was appointed the Welsh Minister for Climate Change in 2021. In a 2014 interview, James mentioned that he finds it challenging to live in a small village: "You have to speak to everybody, and everybody knows your business. For someone like me, who's a little bit autistic or something, it can be quite intense." He also mentioned he does not own a smartphone.

On 17 January 2020, James's father died. He later stated in his user18081971 SoundCloud profile bio that "it was not related to COVID-19". His mother died on 13 April 2022. In 2025, James posted two new songs on SoundCloud. The art featured a photo of James on a beach with a woman, thought to be his girlfriend Cordelia Angel Clarke.

== Awards ==
Year	Awards	Category	Work	Result
1998	MTV Video Music Awards	Best Special Effects	"Come to Daddy"	Nominated
1998	D&AD Awards	Pop Promo Video with a budget over £40,000	"Come to Daddy"	Yellow Pencil
1998	D&AD Awards	Direction	"Come to Daddy"	Yellow Pencil
1998	MTV Europe Music Awards	Best Video	"Come to Daddy"	Nominated
1999	MTV Europe Music Awards	Best Video	"Windowlicker"	Nominated
1999	Prix Ars Electronica	Digital Music	Himself	Won
1999	Online Music Awards	Best Electronic Fansite	Himself	Nominated
2000	Brit Awards	Best British Video	"Windowlicker"	Nominated
2000	D&AD Awards	Direction	"Windowlicker"	Yellow Pencil
2000	D&AD Awards	Editing	"Windowlicker"	Yellow Pencil
2000	NME Awards	Single of the Year	"Windowlicker"	Won
2000	NME Awards	Best Dance Act	Himself	Nominated
2002	NME Awards	Best Dance Act	Himself	Nominated
2002	Brit Awards	British Male Solo Artist	Himself	Nominated
2002	Shortlist Music Prize	Album of the Year	Drukqs	Nominated
2005	Antville Music Video Awards	Best Video	"Rubber Johnny"	Nominated
2010	DJ Mag Best of British Awards	Best Live Act	Himself	Nominated
2010	UK Festival Awards	Critics' Choice Award	L.E.D. Festival	Nominated
2012	UK Festival Awards	Best Headline Performance	Himself	Nominated
2014	DJ Mag Best of British Awards	Outstanding Contribution	Himself	Won
2014	Rober Awards Music Poll	Best Male Artist	Himself	Nominated
2014	Rober Awards Music Poll	Comeback of the Year	Himself	Nominated
2014	Rober Awards Music Poll	Best Electronica	Himself	Won
2015	Grammy Awards	Best Dance/Electronica Album	Syro	Won
2015	International Dance Music Awards	Best Full Length Studio Recording	Syro	Nominated
2015	IMPALA Awards	Album of the Year	Syro	Nominated
2015	Mercury Prize	Album of the Year	Syro	Nominated
2015	Libera Awards	Album of the Year	Syro	Nominated
2015	Libera Awards	Creative Packaging Award	Syro	Won
2015	Libera Awards	Marketing Genius	Syro album release campaign	Nominated
2016	Brit Awards	British Male Solo Artist	Himself	Nominated
2018	Rober Awards Music Poll	Best EP	Collapse	Nominated
2018	Best Art Vinyl	Best Art Vinyl	Collapse	Nominated
2018	UK Video Music Awards	Best Dance Video	"T69 Collapse"	Nominated
2018	UK Video Music Awards	Best Visual Effects in a Video	"T69 Collapse"	Nominated
2018	UK Video Music Awards	Best Animation in a Video	"T69 Collapse"	Nominated
2019	Classic Pop Reader Awards	Video of the Year	"T69 Collapse"	Nominated
2019	Brit Awards	British Male Solo Artist	Himself	Nominated
2019	Libera Awards	Marketing Genius	Collapse	Won
2019	Libera Awards	Video of the Year	"T69 Collapse"	Nominated
2024	Grammy Awards	Best Dance/Electronic Recording	"Blackbox Life Recorder 21f"	Nominated
2024	AIM Independent Music Awards	Best Creative Campaign	Himself	Won

== Discography ==
Studio albums

- Selected Ambient Works 85–92 (1992)
- Selected Ambient Works Volume II (1994)
- ...I Care Because You Do (1995)
- Richard D. James Album (1996)
- Drukqs (2001)
- Syro (2014)

Compilations

- Classics (1995)
- Music from the Merch Desk (2016–2023) (2024)

EPs

- Digeridoo (1992)
- Xylem Tube (1992)
- On (1993)
- Ventolin (1995)
- Donkey Rhubarb (1995)
- Girl/Boy (1996)
- Come to Daddy (1997)
- Windowlicker (1999)
- Computer Controlled Acoustic Instruments pt2 (2015)
- Cheetah (2016)
- Collapse (2018)
- Blackbox Life Recorder 21f / In a Room7 F760 (2023)

== See also ==
- List of ambient music artists
- List of British Grammy winners and nominees
