= Hyperreal.org =

Rave culture website

- The Hyperreal website in 1996
- Website type: Rave scene, dance music, club drugs
- Headquarters: San Francisco, California, United States
- Editor: Brian Behlendorf
- Website: hyperreal.org
- Commercial: No
- Launched: 1994; 32 years ago

Hyperreal.org, also known as Hyperreal, was a rave culture website founded by Brian Behlendorf in 1994. It is based in San Francisco.

== History ==
It was founded by Brian Behlendorf and originated as the SFRaves mailing list in 1992, before launching as Hyperreal in 1994. The present website has been active since 1997.

Having already discovered early newsgroups and online mailing lists such as alt.rave and UK-Dance, Behlendorf set out to create a list of rave parties happening in the US, particularly in the San Francisco area. Hyperreal would soon expand into a collection of articles about dance music and club drugs, when at the time very few resources existed online. The site name originated from The Shamen track of the same name.

In its earliest incarnation, Hyperreal hosted the IDM List, a mailing list dedicated to discussion of the music from artists such as Aphex Twin and Mu-Ziq, and associated labels Rephlex Records and Warp. It also hosted an ambient music mailing list.

Hyperreal would also at one time host the first official home page for Brian Eno.
