= Avril 14th =

Instrumental by Aphex Twin

Instrumental by Aphex Twin

from the album Drukqs
- Released: 22 October 2001
- Genre: Contemporary classical
- Length: 2:05
- Label: Warp
- Songwriter: Richard D. James

Audio sample
- "Avril 14th": file; help

"Avril 14th" is a piano instrumental by the English electronic musician Richard D. James, released under his name Aphex Twin on his 2001 album Drukqs. It was recorded using a Disklavier, a computer-controlled piano.

== Composition ==
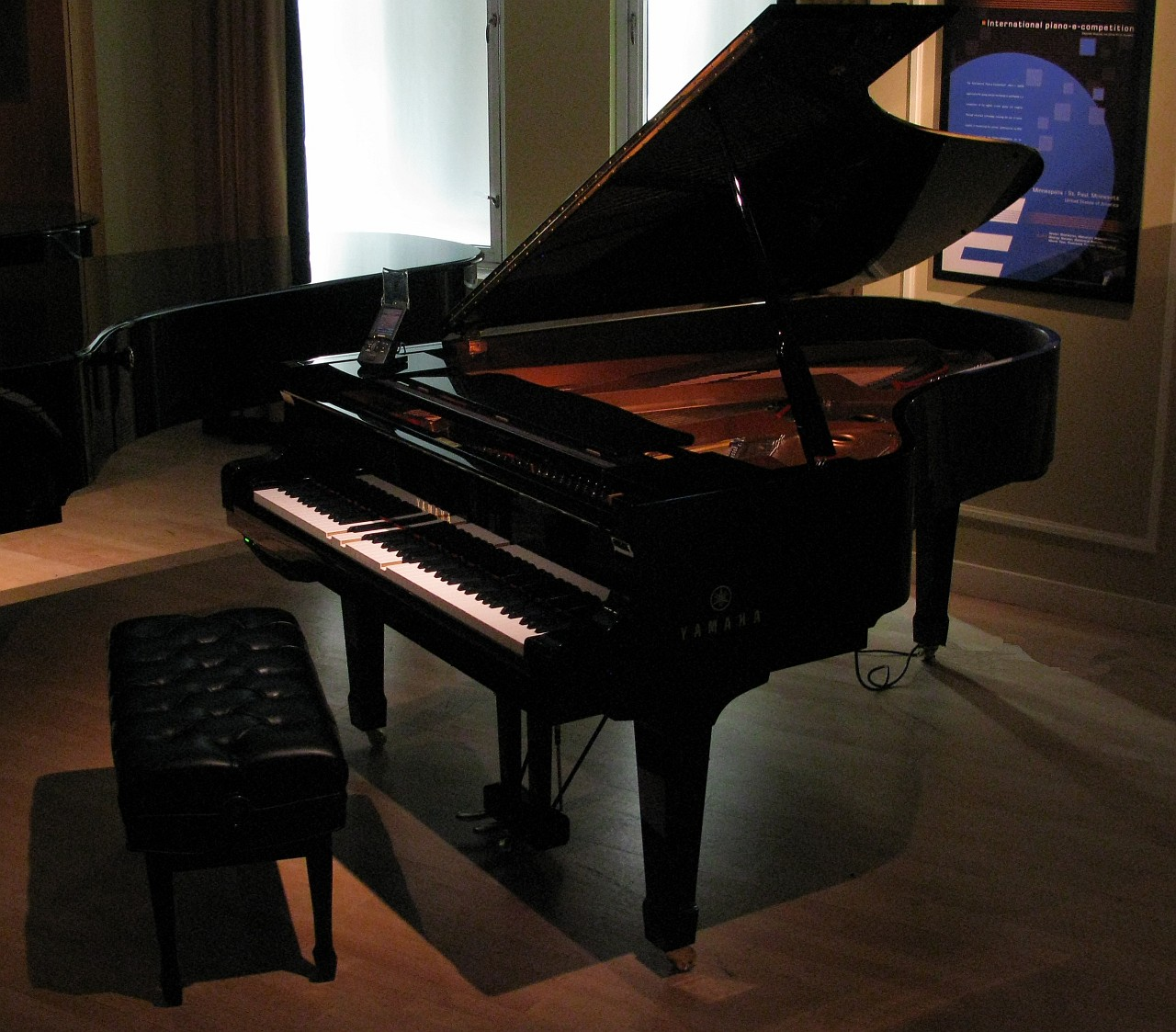
A Disklavier piano

Whereas most of James's music is electronic, "Avril 14th" is a piano composition. It was recorded using a Disklavier, a piano with a mechanism that reads MIDI data and plays the keyboard without human input. The clicking of the mechanism is audible on the recording. According to the Fact writer Scott Wilson, "The result is something that sounds human but not quite." Another Fact writer, Al Horner, described it as a "a butterfly-fragile float" of "piano calm". Several critics likened it to the works of Erik Satie.

== Reception ==
Reviewing Drukqs in 2001, Pitchfork wrote that "'Avril 14th' [...] rove dangerously close to the Windham Hill new age aesthetic of the 80s". It surprised some listeners expecting more electronic work, though Fact wrote in 2017 that it was "a perfect embodiment of Aphex and the line he constantly treads between the mechanical and the human". As of April 2017, "Avril 14th" had been streamed 124 million times on Spotify, 106 million more than Aphex Twin's 1999 single "Windowlicker".

== Appearances ==
"Avril 14th" has been used in films including Marie Antoinette (2006), Four Lions (2010), and the international trailer for Her (2013). For Four Lions, James rerecorded the track with a minor edit. In 2007, "Avril 14th" was sampled for a song used in the SNL digital short "Iran So Far". As NBC had not obtained the rights to use the track, the short was removed from YouTube. The short was reuploaded to Saturday Night Live's official YouTube channel on August 14, 2013.

The American rapper Kanye West used elements of "Avril 14th" for his 2010 track "Blame Game". According to James, after he was sent an early version of "Blame Game" with a heavily timestretched sample of "Avril 14th", he offered to rerecord it at a different tempo, but West's team said it belonged to them and tried to avoid paying for its use. The final version of "Blame Game" used a rerecorded version of "Avril 14th" rather than a sample, and James received credit.

On December 4, 2018, James released two alternative versions of "Avril 14th" on his webstore, subtitled "reversed music not audio" and "half speed alternative version". A third version, subtitled "doubletempo half speed", was removed from the store the same day.

== Certifications ==
Region	Certification	Certified units/sales
United Kingdom (BPI)	Silver	200,000^{‡}
^{‡} Sales+streaming figures based on certification alone.
