= Selected Ambient Works 85–92 =

Studio album by Aphex Twin
- Released: 9 November 1992
- Recorded: 1985–1992
- Genres: Ambient techno; IDM; electronica
- Length: 74:40
- Label: Apollo
- Producer: Richard D. James

Richard D. James chronology
Joyrex J5 EP (1992)	Selected Ambient Works 85–92 (1992)	Analogue Bubblebath Vol 3 (1992)

Aphex Twin album chronology
Selected Ambient Works 85‍–‍92 (1992)	Selected Ambient Works Volume II (1994)

Selected Ambient Works 85–92 is the debut album by the British electronic music artist and producer Aphex Twin, whose real name is Richard D. James. It was released on 9 November 1992 through Apollo Records, a subsidiary of the Belgian label R&S Records. The album consists of ambient techno recorded to cassette as early as 1985, when James was 13–14 years old. It received acclaim and entered the Dance Albums Chart at No. 6 in December 1992.

Selected Ambient Works 85–92 is considered a classic, defining work of electronica. Music journalists have credited it with expanding the scope of ambient music and introducing techno to fans of indie music. The website AllMusic described it as "a masterpiece of ambient techno". Selected Ambient Works 85–92 has appeared on best-of lists; in 2012 the UK magazine Fact named it the greatest album of the 1990s.

== Background ==
James began experimenting with musical instruments, such as his family's piano, at an early age. He later created music using a ZX Spectrum home computer and a sampler, and began reassembling and modifying his own synthesisers. James said he composed ambient music the following year. In an interview with Q in 2014, James said the ambient track "i" emerged from these early recordings. As a teenager, James gained a cult following as a DJ at the Shire Horse Inn in St Ives, Cornwall, with Tom Middleton at the Bowgie Inn in Crantock, and on Cornish beaches.

James's first release was the 12" EP Analogue Bubblebath, released on Mighty Force in September 1991. It was played on the influential London radio station Kiss FM, giving it wide exposure in the dance music scene. It gained distribution in continental Europe, and was heard by Renaat Vandepapeliere, the head of R&S Records, at that time one of the leading European rave labels. James visited him in Belgium, bringing a box full of cassettes of his music. From these cassettes they picked tracks for two records, including Selected Ambient Works 85–92.

== Composition ==
"Xtal"
The opening track

According to James, Selected Ambient Works 85–92 was recorded between 1985 and 1992, beginning when he was 13/14, using homemade equipment constructed from synthesisers and drum machines. The website AllMusic described the sound quality as poor due to it being recorded onto a cassette that was damaged by a cat. The album differs from ambient music by musicians such as Brian Eno. According to The Independent, it pays homage to the "refracted minimalism" of the composers Philip Glass and Karlheinz Stockhausen. James said the songs "were just tracks that my mates selected; ones that they like to chill out to".

Commentators categorised Selected Ambient Works 85–92 as ambient techno, intelligent dance music (IDM), electronica and ambient. According to AllMusic's Anthony Tognazzini, the album draws from the club rhythms of techno and acid house, but adds melodic elements "of great subtlety, beauty, and atmospheric texture". Ben Murphy of DJ Mag described its synthesis of elements from techno, house, hip-hop, hardcore and ambient, and characterised it as a "somnambulist dreamscape that melted heavenly shoe-gaze melodies into slow-burn beats and ice-clear techno, often with a suggestion of menace lurking at the peripheries". He likened the "fuzzy melodies and blurred female vocal" of the opening track, "Xtal", to the shoegaze artists Seefeel and My Bloody Valentine. Kris Needs of Record Collector said the album "demonstrated a mysterious, calmer side" of James's music in contrast to his abrasive earlier releases, calling attention to the presence of "unearthly, gorgeous melodies" on much of the album. Barney Hoskyns described the album as a "schizoid mix of sonic assault and melodic melancholia". Rolling Stone's Pat Blashill said the album combined "lush soundscapes with oceanic beats and bass lines". Jon Savage wrote that it "trashed the boundaries between acid, techno, ambient, and psychedelic".

David M. Pecoraro of Pitchfork wrote: "Despite the simplicity of his equipment and approach, the songs here are both interesting and varied, ranging from the dancefloor-friendly beats of 'Pulsewidth' to the industrial clanks and whirs of 'Green Calx'." In The Guardian, Geeta Dayal wrote that "Ageispolis" progresses in a "grand, cinematic sweep". Simon Reynolds described its melody as "Satie-esque" with an "incongruously strident, unrelenting beat". "Tha" features a "murk[y]" beat and "underwater" sound, according to Dayal. Writing for Slant Magazine, Sal Cinquemani noted the use of "diffusive synth chords" throughout, and the "pop sensibility" on tracks such as "Pulsewidth" and "Ptolemy".

"Green Calx" uses a sample from the 1987 film RoboCop; "Xtal" samples "Evil At Play" by Steve Jeffries, Mary Carewe and Donald Greig; and "We Are the Music Makers" samples dialogue from the 1971 film Willy Wonka & the Chocolate Factory. They were probably sampled using James's Casio FZ-10M, which allows the user to record and load sounds via floppy disk.

== Release ==
Selected Ambient Works 85‍–‍92 was released on 9 November 1992 through Apollo, an ambient imprint of the Belgian record label R&S Records. In the UK, it was initially available only via import because a licensing deal between R&S and Outer Rhythm had collapsed earlier in the year. The import release was priced as high as £20 (equivalent to £44 in 2025). The album was the first record released by R&S in the UK after it started its own operations in the country instead of licensing their releases to another label. James left R&S after the release as he had signed to Warp Records and also wanted to focus on his own label, Rephlex Records.

Selected Ambient Works 85‍–‍92 entered the CIN's Dance Albums Chart at number 6 on 26 December 1992. It was still in the top 10 when James's next album, Surfing on Sine Waves (using the alias Polygon Window), was released in January 1993, and he briefly had two records in the Dance Top 10 under different pseudonyms. By June 1993 Selected Ambient Works 85–92 had sold 30,000 copies.

The album sleeve displays the Aphex Twin symbol, which was designed by Paul Nicholson, who was also a stage dancer at several of James's live gigs around this period. Nicholson said they wanted the logo to be an "amorphic and soft" form with "no sharp lines". According to James, the design was a collaborative effort:

He designed it all but I was guiding, like "nah more like this, yeah more like that" etc. [It was] my idea to put the circle around it. There were quite a few iterations before I was happy. I was also astute enough to buy the rights off him, with my last pounds, I was still a student, as I knew it would be very important to me and I also didn't want any arguments down the road.

== Reception and legacy ==
Professional ratings
Review scores
Source	Rating
AllMusic	5/5 stars
The Encyclopedia of Popular Music	5/5 stars
Mojo	4/5 stars
Pitchfork	9.4/10
Q	5/5 stars
Record Collector	5/5 stars
Rolling Stone	4/5 stars
The Rolling Stone Album Guide	4/5 stars
Slant Magazine	4/5 stars
Spin Alternative Record Guide	9/10

Selected Ambient Works 85‍–‍92 received acclaim and almost immediately acquired a "huge underground reputation". Andrew Smith, reviewing the album for Melody Maker, wrote: "Not since Kraftwerk has an artist understood texture in this way, made electronic music sound so organic and resonant, so full of life." The author and critic Simon Reynolds, writing in Melody Maker at the end of 1993, called it "the most sheerly beautiful album of '93 [and] also the most significant", and said it "gave credibility to the then emergent genre of ambient techno" and "singlehandedly won over many indie fans who hadn't really listened to much techno, thus encouraging them to seek out more".

The album's stature grew in the decades following. It has been described as a defining electronica and ambient record that showcased electronic music as a work of "nuance and ambition" that took advantage of the LP format. Neil Mason, the editor of Electronic Sound, said the album arrived "at exactly the right time. The acid house explosion of 1988 had ushered in an entirely new genre of music, but by 1992 it was beginning to settle and this sort of music was starting to cross over." Reviewing the 2002 reissue, Rolling Stone's Pat Blashill called it a "gorgeous, ethereal album" in which James "proved that techno could be more than druggy dance music". David M. Pecoraro of Pitchfork described "the creeping basslines, the constantly mutating drum patterns, the synth tones which moved with all the grace and fluidity of a professional dancer"; he described the album as "among the most interesting music ever created with a keyboard and a computer" despite its "primitive origins". In 2012 Reynolds said it "infuses everyday life with a perpetual first flush of spring". Peter Manning, in his book Electronic and Computer Music, wrote that James "managed finally to elevate [electronic music's] status to the mainstream consciousness of the general public". Selected Ambient Works 85–92 expanded the scope of ambient music and, according to Savage, it "defined a new techno primitive romanticism". AllMusic's John Bush called it "a masterpiece of ambient techno" and a "work of brilliance".

Selected Ambient Works 85‍–‍92 has appeared on several best-of lists. In 2003 it was at placed at number 92 in NME's "100 Best Albums" poll. Ten years later NME included it in their list of the 500 Greatest Albums of All Time at No. 121. In 2012 Fact named it the greatest album of the 1990s. Selected Ambient Works 85‍–‍92 re-entered the dance chart after the release of Aphex Twin's 2014 album Syro. In 2015 Spin placed Selected Ambient Works 85–92 the 204th-best album released in the preceding 30 years. In 2017 Pitchfork named it the best IDM album. It was also included in the 2018 edition of the book 1001 Albums You Must Hear Before You Die. In 2022 The Independent described it as a landmark 1990s record. In 2024 Uncut ranked it the 32nd-greatest album of the 1990s. The editor, John Robinson, highlighted its "succinct, mysterious ambiences" and "soft and oddly nostalgic tunes", adding: "If this collected Richard James's past, it suggests everyone else's future."

== Track listing ==
All tracks are written by Richard D. James except where noted.

Selected Ambient Works 85–92 track listing
No.	Title	Writer(s)	Length
1.	"Xtal"	Richard D. James; Donald Grieg; Mary Carewe; Steve Jeffries	4:51
2.	"Tha"		9:01
3.	"Pulsewidth"		3:47
4.	"Ageispolis"		5:21
5.	"i"		1:13
6.	"Green Calx"		6:02
7.	"Heliosphan"		4:51
8.	"We Are the Music Makers"		7:42
9.	"Schottkey 7th Path"		5:07
10.	"Ptolemy"		7:12
11.	"Hedphelym"		6:02
12.	"Delphium"		5:36
13.	"Actium"		7:35
Total length:			74:40

== Personnel ==
Credits adapted from Selected Ambient Works 85‍–‍92 liner notes.

- Richard D. James – writing, production

== Charts ==
1992 weekly chart performance for Selected Ambient Works 85–92
Chart (1992)	Peak position
UK Dance Albums (CIN)	6

2022 weekly chart performance for Selected Ambient Works 85–92
Chart (2022)	Peak position
UK Dance Albums (Official Charts)	5

2026 weekly chart performance for Selected Ambient Works 85–92
Chart (2026)	Peak position
Scottish Albums (Official Charts)	18
UK Albums Sales (OCC)	19
UK Independent Albums (Official Charts)	10

== Certifications ==
Certifications for Selected Ambient Works 85–92
Region	Certification	Certified units/sales
United Kingdom (BPI) sales since 2011	Silver	60,000^{‡}
^{‡} Sales+streaming figures based on certification alone.
