= Aphex Twin SoundCloud demos =

Electronic music demos

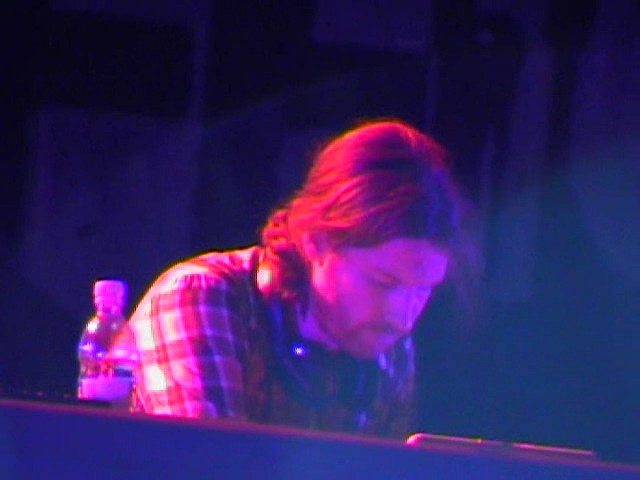
James performing in 2007

In 2015, Richard D. James, who releases music under aliases including Aphex Twin, anonymously uploaded hundreds of demos and unreleased tracks to the music sharing site SoundCloud. The tracks were uploaded under a variety of pseudonyms. James said he released the music to relieve his family of the pressure to release his archives after he dies. He added more tracks in 2020, 2023 and 2025.

== History ==
In January 2015, James began anonymously uploading demos to the music sharing site SoundCloud. Some tracks dated to the late 1980s or early 1990s. He tagged the first track with the comment: "like early aphex but I'd never heard of him when I wrote all these tracks im going to be uploading".

Over the course of several days, James deleted and relaunched the page several times with different URLs, possibly after reaching the upload limit for free SoundCloud accounts. Over the course of several months he uploaded 269 tracks, including early versions of tracks later included on the 2016 EP Cheetah. The user page briefly read "I AM NOT RICHARD", with a link to a YouTube channel containing all the tracks. In May, the tracks were removed. In 2017, the tracks "3 GERALD REMIX" and "24 TSIM 2" were compiled on a record sold exclusively at a Michigan record store.

In 2018, James explained his reasons for the releases: "I've got all this music and I thought if I died what the fuck would my kids do? What would my wife do? They'd get really stressed out and they wouldn't know what to do with it all. So I just thought I'd give it away, then they don't have to think about it." He said his record label, Warp, responded with confusion and that this "made me think it was even a better idea at that point. If the suits are getting annoyed then it's definitely a good idea."

In April 2020, James uploaded "m11st lon", "prememory100N pt2", "tha2", "s8v1 [brooklyn]", "Tha2 [world scam mix]", and "qu 1". In 2023, he uploaded eight additional tracks. The descriptions of "Short Forgotten Produk Trk Omc" and "2nd Neotek Test Trac Omc" stated they were recorded between 2006 and 2007. In 2025, James uploaded "Zahl am1 live track 1" and "Zahl am1 live track 1c f760m1 unfinshd', writing: "Got many requests for this one from a few years back. [...] Mixed down on the Zähl, think there are better mixes, will upload them if I find them."

== Reception ==
In 2015, the Pitchfork journalist Philip Sherburne wrote that the tracks were made in different periods with different equipment, but bore the hallmarks of James' work: "You can hear the same machines, the same processes, and above all, the same ideas—if this isn't James, then it's a musician who's every bit his peer, and what are the chances of one of those going undiscovered for all these years?" Mike Paradinas, one of James' collaborators, vouched for the music's authenticity on his Facebook account. The Guardian journalist Stuart Aitken argued that James' experiments with SoundCloud and other digital media should encourage musicians to explore the creative opportunities of the internet.
