= Acid techno =

Music genre

- Stylistic origins: Acid house; techno; trance; hardcore
- Cultural origins: Late 1980s, UK and US

Regional scenes
- Germany; United Kingdom; United States

Acid techno, sometimes known as "acid", is a genre of techno that was derived from acid house and developed in Europe in the late 1980s to early 1990s. It saw younger artists apply the "squelching" synthesizer sound of Chicago acid house to harder-edged techno material.

== Characteristics ==
The acid style was obtained largely through Roland instruments, most prominently the TB-303 bass synthesizer. The term Acid specifically refers to the harsh "acidic" squelching sound of the Roland 303. The acid sound is achieved by turning up the filter resonance and turning down the cutoff frequency parameters of the synthesizer, along with programming the 303's accent, slide, and octave parameters.

In addition to acid records imported from the US, the style was influenced by sources such as hardcore, German trance, and Belgian rave music.

== History ==
Early proponents of the style included Richie Hawtin (aka Plastikman), Aphex Twin, Dave Clarke and Hardfloor. Other mainstays included London acts such as Liberators, Henry Cullen (aka D.A.V.E. The Drummer), Guy McAffer (aka The Geezer), and DDR. In London, the acid techno scene developed via illegal network of parties; the 1997 compilation It's Not Intelligent…And It's Not From Detroit…But It's F**king 'Avin It was subtitled "The Sound of London's Acid Techno Underground" and helped to solidify the genre in the underground consciousness.

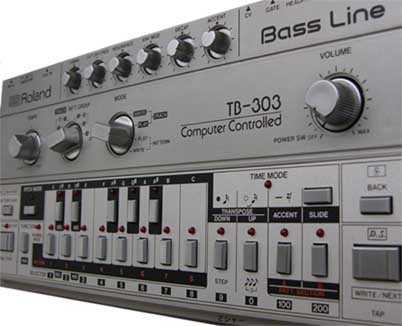
The Roland TB-303 bass synthesizer provided the electronic squelch sounds often heard in acid tracks.

== See also ==
- Acid breaks
