= Acid (electronic music) =

Subgenre of electronic dance music

- Stylistic origins: Chicago house; techno; trance
- Cultural origins: Mid-1980s, US

Subgenres
- Acid house; acid techno; acid trance; acid breaks

Acid is an umbrella term for styles of electronic music—such as acid house, acid trance, acid techno, and acid breaks—which employ the "squelching" sounds of the Roland TB-303 synthesizer. The acid sound became popular in the mid-1980s in connection with the Chicago house scene, including artists such as Phuture and labels like Trax Records.

The term acid specifically refers to the harsh squelching sound of the Roland 303. The acid sound is achieved by turning up the filter resonance and turning down the cutoff frequency parameters of the synthesizer, along with programming the 303's accent, slide, and octave parameters. The term acid has also been suggested to refer to the psychedelic qualities of the music, which may resemble elements of 1960s acid rock.

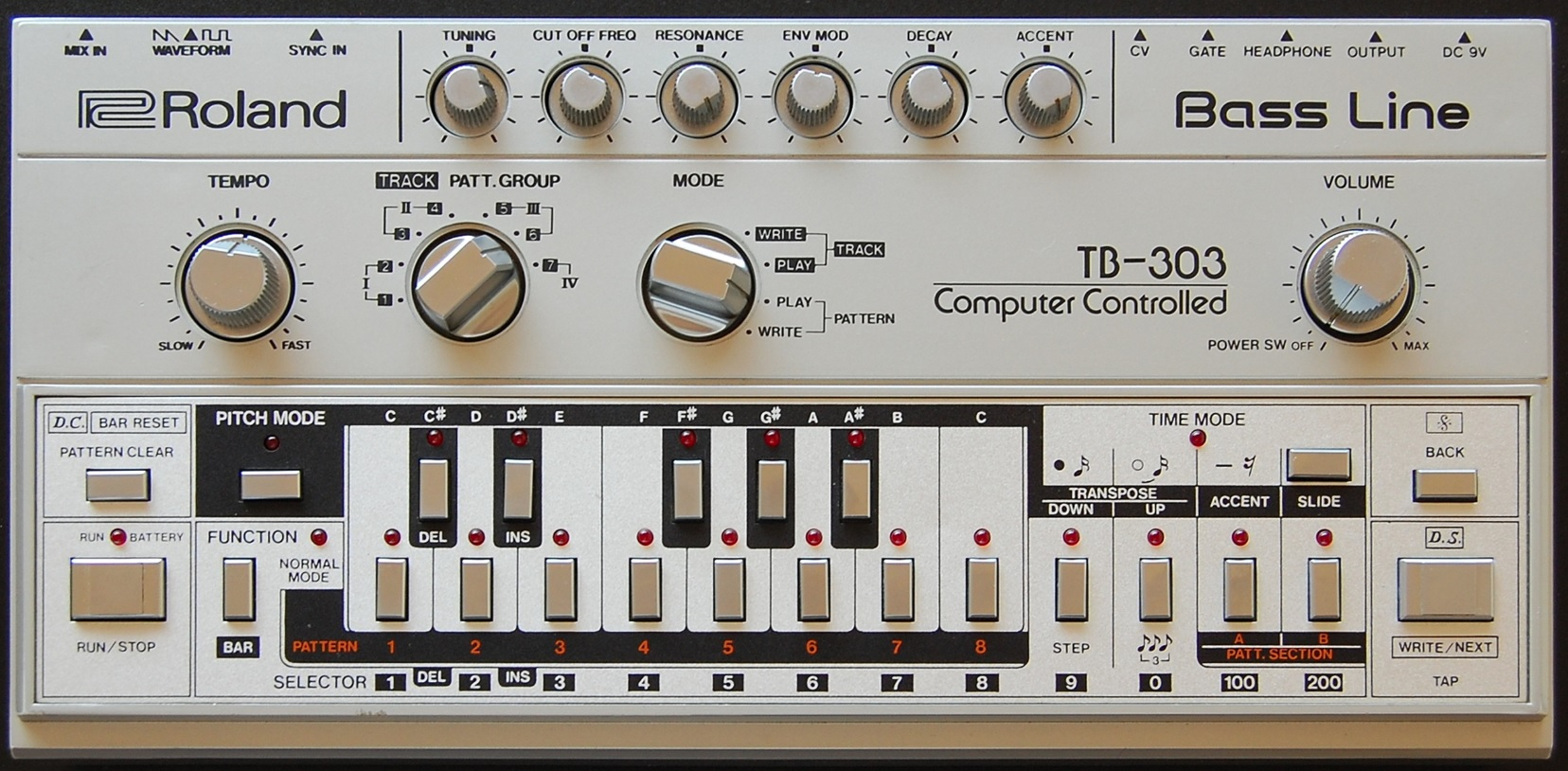
The Roland TB-303 bass synthesizer is the origin of the squelching sounds often heard in acid music.
