= Rephlex Records discography =

This is the complete discography of Rephlex Records.

Catalogue number alphabetically	Artist name	Release title	Date released
ANALORD 01	AFX	Analord 01	24 January 2005
ANALORD 02	AFX	Analord 02	24 January 2005
ANALORD 03	AFX	Analord 03	21 February 2005
ANALORD 04	AFX	Analord 04	21 February 2005
ANALORD 05	AFX	Analord 05	14 March 2005
ANALORD 06	AFX	Analord 06	11 April 2005
ANALORD 07	AFX	Analord 07	25 April 2005
ANALORD 08	AFX	Analord 08	9 May 2005
ANALORD 09	AFX	Analord 09	13 June 2005
ANALORD 10	Aphex Twin	Analord 10	15 December 2004, rereleased 11 July 2005
ANALORD 11	AFX	Analord 11	13 June 2005
BFORD 15 A	Baby Ford	Normal EP (Part 2)	
BFORD 15 R	Baby Ford	Normal Re	
BFORD 15 T	Baby Ford	Normal EP (Part 1)	
BFORD 15 X	Baby Ford	Normal	
CAT 001	Bradley Strider	Bradley's Beat	1995
CAT 002	Q-Chastic	Q-Chastic EP	
CAT 003	IG-88	(unknown)	
CAT 004	Caustic Window	Joyrex J4	July 1992
CAT 005	Caustic Window	Joyrex J5	July 1992
CAT 006	Synectics	The Purple Universe	
CAT 007	The Kosmik Kommando	Kosmik Kommando EP	1992
CAT 008	AFX	Analogue Bubblebath 3	1992
CAT 009 i	Caustic Window	Joyrex J9i	1993
CAT 009 ii	Caustic Window	Joyrex J9ii	1993
CAT 009 LP	Caustic Window	Compilation	1998
CAT 010	The Kosmik Kommando	Freaquenseize	1993
CAT 010E5	The Kosmik Kommando	Side E5	
CAT 011	Kinesthesia	Kinesthesia Volume 1	
CAT 012	Chimera	Valley of the Spirits	1993
CAT 013	μ-Ziq	Tango N' Vectif	
CAT 014	Kinesthesia	Kinesthesia Volume 2	
CAT 015	Cylob	Industrial Folk Songs	
CAT 016	Vibert/Simmonds	Weirs	
CAT 017	Drexciya	Drexciya 3: Molecular Enhancement	
CAT 018	μ-Ziq	Bluff Limbo	
CAT 019	AFX	Analogue Bubblebath 4	1 July 1994
CAT 020	Bradley Strider	Bradley's Robot	1993
CAT 021	Vulva	From the Cockpit	
CAT 022	Kinesthesia	Empathy Box/Empathy Box (Remixes)	
CAT 023	Caustic Window	Caustic Window untitled album	Planned for release in 1996, shelved. One test pressing sold in 2014
CAT 024	Synectics/Ono	Promo EP	
CAT 025	(various artists)	The Best of Futuresound Records	
CAT 026	The Lisa Carbon Trio	Polyester	
CAT 027	Mike & Rich	Expert Knob Twiddlers	24 June 1996
CAT 028	X-Asp	Terra Ferma	
CAT 029	DMX Krew	Sound of the Street	
CAT 030	Bochum Welt	Scharlach Eingang	
CAT 031	Leo Anibaldi	Void	
CAT 032	Cylob	Loops and Breaks	
CAT 033	Cylob	Cylobian Sunset	
CAT 034	AFX	Analogue Bubblebath 5	1995
CAT 035	Vulva	Birdwatch	
CAT 036	Seefeel	(CH-VOX)	
CAT 037	Squarepusher	Feed Me Weird Things	
CAT 038	Global Goon	Goon	
CAT 039	D'Arcangelo	D'Arcangelo EP	
CAT 040	The Gentle People	Journey EP	
CAT 041	The Gentle People	Emotion Heater	
CAT 042	Bochum Welt	Module 2	
CAT 043	PCP	Total Sickness	
CAT 044	Cylob	Diof '97	
CAT 045	The Gentle People	Soundtracks for Living	
CAT 046	Bochum Welt	Feelings on a Screen	
CAT 047	DMX Krew	You Can't Hide Your Love/You Can't Hide Your Love Remixes	
CAT 048	Sam & Valley	My Favourite Clinic	
CAT 049	Cylob	Cylob's Latest Effort	
CAT 050	K-Rock	New Deal	
CAT 051	Bochum Welt	Desktop Robotics	
CAT 052	Kiyoshi Izumi	Effect Rainbow	
CAT 053	DMX Krew	Ffressshh!	
CAT 054	Leila	Don't Fall Asleep	
CAT 055	Cylob	Previously Unavailable on Compact Disc	
CAT 056	Leila	Like Weather	
CAT 057	Global Goon	Afterlife	
CAT 058	Global Goon	Cradle of History	
CAT 059	Chaos A.D.	Buzz Caner	
CAT 060	Freakwincey	I Farted	
CAT 061	DMX Krew	Nu Romantix	
CAT 062	Leila	Space, Love	
CAT 063	The Gentle People	Mix Gently	
CAT 064	J.P. Buckle	Flying Lo-Fi	
CAT 065	Dynamix II	From 1985 to Present	
CAT 066	The Railway Raver	Drop Acid Not Bombs	
CAT 067	Leila	Feeling	
CAT 068	Bodenständig 2000	Maxi German Rave Blast Hits 3	
CAT 069 R	DJ Mike Dred	98k Live	
CAT 070	Mike Dred/Peter Green	Virtual Farmer	
CAT 071	Leila With Luca Stantucci	Heaven on Their Minds	
CAT 072	DMX Krew	Adrenalin Flow	
CAT 073	Headcleaner	Position Normal	
CAT 074	Cylob	Rewind	
CAT 075	Cylob	Living in the 1980s	
CAT 076	Cylob	Lobster Tracks	
CAT 077	BR Posse	Dreaming of the Bassline	
CAT 078	D'Arcangelo	Shipwreck	
CAT 079	Lektrogirl	I Love My Computer	8 November 1999
CAT 080	808 State	Newbuild	
CAT 081	Ovuca	Lactavent	25 October 1999
CAT 082	Bogdan Raczynski	Boku Mo Wakaran	11 September 2000
CAT 083	The Jones Machine	You're the One (Part Two)/(I'm the) Disco Dancing	
CAT 084	Fuschimuschi	My Number One/Super Sexy Lady	4 October 1999
CAT 085	Bogdan Raczynski	Samurai Math Beats	
CAT 086	DMX Krew	We Are DMX/Good Time Girl/Denki No Merodie	11 October 1999
CAT 087	Aphex Twin	Melodies from Mars	Planned for release in 1999, shelved the same year. A promo copy owned by Grant Wilson-Claridge appeared for sale on eBay in 2014, and sold for US$14,900.
CAT 088	The Gentle People	Simply Faboo	27 September 1999
CAT 089	Bogdan Raczynski	Thinking of You	10 April 2000
CAT 100	(various artists)	The Braindance Coincidence	2 April 2001
CAT 101	Ensemble	Sketch Proposals	8 May 2000
CAT 102	Bogdan Raczynski	Ibiza Anthems 4	27 March 2000
CAT 103	Slipper	Invisible Movies	26 June 2000
CAT 104	Ovuca	Onclements	21 August 2000
CAT 105	Ovuca	King Stacey	10 April 2000
CAT 106	P.P. Roy	You Can't Help Liking	4 September 2000
CAT 107	Like A Tim	Red and Blue Boxing	15 May 2000
CAT 108	The Kosmik Kommando	Laptop Dancing	13 November 2000
CAT 109	Yee-King	Superuser	30 October 2000
CAT 110	Ovuca	Wasted Sunday	
CAT 111	The Railway Raver	You'll Never Get Anywhere By Spending All Day Playing Around With That Bloody Drum Machine EP	
CAT 113	Bogdan Raczynski	Muzyka Dla Imigrantów	
CAT 114	Peter Green	Macbeth: An Original Score	
CAT 115	Bogdan Raczynski	My Love I Love	
CAT 116	Robert Normandeau	Sonars	
CAT 117	Universal Indicator	Innovation in the Dynamics of Acid	2001
CAT 118	Global Goon	Vatican Nitez	
CAT 119	Pierre Bastien	Mecanoid	
CAT 120	Bogdan Raczynski	96 Drum 'n' Bass Classixxx	
CAT 121	Cylob	Cut the Midrange Drop the Bass	
CAT 122	Cylob	Mood Bells	
CAT 123	Astrobotnia	Part 01	
CAT 124	Astrobotnia	Part 02	
CAT 125	Astrobotnia	Part 03	
CAT 126	P.P. Roy	Seven Up	
CAT 127	D'Arcangelo	Broken Toys' Corner	
CAT 128	Transllusion	L.I.F.E.	
CAT 129	Stakker	Eurotechno	
CAT 130	Humanoid	Sessions 84-88	
CAT 131	Bogdan Raczynski	Renegade Platinum Mega Dance Attack Party: Don the Plates/I Will Eat Your Children Too!	
CAT 132	Lory D.	Sounds Never Seen	
CAT 133	DJ Scud	Ambush!	
CAT 134	The Bug	Pressure	
CAT 135	Victor Gama	Pangeia Instrumentos	
CAT 137	The Bug	Gun Disease	
CAT 138	Amen Andrews	Vol 01	
CAT 139	Amen Andrews	Vol 02	
CAT 140	Amen Andrews	Vol 03	
CAT 141	Amen Andrews	Vol 04	
CAT 142	Amen Andrews	Vol 05	
CAT 143	Kerrier District	Kerrier District	
CAT 144	Cylobotnia	Cylobotnia	
CAT 146	Black Devil	Disco Club (Remix)	
CAT 147	BBC Radiophonic Workshop	Music from the BBC Radiophonic Workshop	
CAT 148	Tik & Tok	Tik & Tok EP	
CAT 151	Cylob	Cylob Music System Volume 1	
CAT 152	Cylob	Cylob Music System Volume 2	
CAT 153	DMX Krew	The Collapse of the Wave Function Volume 1	
CAT 154	DMX Krew	The Collapse of the Wave Function Volume 2	
CAT 155	DMX Krew	The Collapse of the Wave Function LP	
CAT 156	(various artists)	Grime	
CAT 157	K-Rock	K-Rock 2	
CAT 158	The Bug	Aktion Pak	
CAT 159	Razor X Productions	Killing Sound	
CAT 160	(various artists)	Grime 2	
CAT 161	Arpanet	Quantum Transposition	29 August 2005
CAT 162	Pierre Bastien	Pop	
CAT 173 CD	AFX	Chosen Lords	10 April 2006
CAT 174	Bogdan Raczynski & Björk	Who Is It (Shooting Stars & Asteroids Mix)	
CAT 175	DMX Krew	Many Worlds (The Collapse Of The Wave Function Volume 4)	8 August 2005
CAT 176	DMX Krew	The Transactional Interpretation (The Collapse Of The Wave Function Volume 5)	8 August 2005
CAT 177 EP	Spac Hand Luke	Sidthug	
CAT 178	Amen Andrews V Spac Hand Luke	Amen Andrews Vs. Spac Hand Luke	
CAT 179 EP	Urban Tribe	Biohazard 17284	
CAT 180	Urban Tribe	Authorized Clinical Trials	22 May 2006
CAT 181 CD	Hecker	Recordings for Rephlex	December 4, 2006
CAT 182 CD	Voafose	Voafose	November 13, 2006
CAT 183	Kerrier District	Kerrier District 2	
CAT 184	Urban Tribe	Acceptable Side Effects	February 5, 2007
CAT 185	Ceephax	Volume One	January 22, 2007
CAT 186	Ceephax	Volume Two	April 16, 2007
CAT 187	Aleksi Perälä	Project V	March 19, 2007
CAT 188	D'Arcangelo	Eksel	April 30, 2007
CAT 191	Dopplereffekt	Calabi-Yau Spaces	March 5, 2007
CAT 193	Bogdan Raczynski	Alright!	May 14, 2007
CAT 195	Wisp	The Shimmering Hour	May 12, 2009
CAT 196 EP	Wisp	Katabatic	Dec 9, 2008
CAT 212 EP	Steinvord	Steinvord	January 9, 2012
CAT 806	New Order	Acid House Mixes by 808 State	
CAT 807	808 State	Prebuild	
CAT 808	808 State	Quadrastate	June 4, 2007
CAT 1000	(various artists)	Rephlexions! An Album of Braindance!	November 3, 2003
CYLOB 1	Cylob	Are We Not Men Who Live And Die	
DMX 017	DMX Krew	17 Ways To Break My Heart	
DOG 037	Squarepusher	Squarepusher Plays	
DOG 059	Chaos A.D.	Remixes EP	
KIT 001	Hecker/Voafose	Hecker/Voafose split 10"	
LAT 467	(various artists)	Like A Tim Remixes	
MC-202	Universal Indicator	Yellow	1993
MHUNT 018	Craig Connor	Manhunt Rephlex Remixes	
NO 073	Robert Odell	Black/Flight 313	
PEN 015	Jones	Like Me You're Like Me	
REW 001	Soundmurderer & SK-1	Rewind Records	
SH-101	Universal Indicator	Green	1995
STOP_1T	(various artists)	The Mururoa Project	
TB-303	Universal Indicator	Blue	1992
TOM 001	Squarepusher	Male Pill Part 13	
TR-606	Universal Indicator	Red	1992
