= List of intelligent dance music artists =

This is a list of notable music artists who primarily play intelligent dance music (IDM). Artists/groups are listed alphabetically (excluding "The") and proper names are alphabetized by their first name.

- 808 State
- μ-ziq
- Actress
- Acustic
- AeTopus
- Air Liquide
- Alarm Will Sound
- Aleksi Perälä
- Alva Noto
- Amon Tobin
- Andy Stott
- Aphex Twin
- Apparat
- Arca
- Arovane
- Autechre
- Atom™
- B12
- Beaumont Hannant
- Ben Frost
- Benn Jordan
- Biosphere
- Björk
- The Black Dog
- Blanck Mass
- Blank Banshee
- Boards of Canada
- Bochum Welt
- Bogdan Raczynski
- Boom Bip
- Brothomstates
- BT
- Burial
- Bvdub
- C418
- Cabaret Voltaire
- Carbon Based Lifeforms
- Capitol K
- Casino Versus Japan
- Ceephax Acid Crew
- Cex
- Chris Clark
- Chris Douglas
- Christ.
- Cylob
- Daedelus
- Daisuke Tanabe
- Daniel Myer
- Deadbeat
- Deepchord
- Demdike Stare
- Deru
- Diagram of Suburban Chaos
- DMX Krew
- Dopplereffekt
- Drexciya
- Eight Frozen Modules
- Emptyset
- Esem
- FaltyDL
- Fennesz
- The Field
- The Fireman
- The Flashbulb
- Floating Points
- Flying Lotus
- Forest Swords
- Four Tet
- Freescha
- Freeform
- Funkstörung
- The Future Sound Of London
- Gas
- Gescom
- Global Communication
- Global Goon
- Goldie
- Gridlock
- Himuro Yoshiteru
- I am Robot and Proud
- Innovaders
- Isan
- J Lesser
- Jackson and his Computer Band
- Jan Jelinek
- Jega
- Jello
- Jlin
- John Tejada
- Jon Hopkins
- Kevin Blechdom
- Kid606
- Kim Hiorthøy
- Kodomo
- Koreless
- Lackluster
- Legowelt
- Lemon Jelly
- LFO
- Lone
- Loscil
- Lorenzo Senni
- Lorn
- Lusine
- Machinedrum
- Mark Pritchard
- Marumari
- Matmos
- Meat Beat Manifesto
- Mick Harris
- Mira Calix
- Monolake
- Moderat
- Mouse on Mars
- Murcof
- Nathan Fake
- Obfusc
- Ochre
- Oneohtrix Point Never
- The Orb
- Orbital
- Oval
- Pan Sonic
- Pedro INF
- Peshay
- Phoenecia
- Photek
- Pilote
- Plaid
- Prefuse 73
- Plastikman
- Plone
- Pole
- Push Button Objects
- Pye Corner Audio
- Raoul Sinier
- Richard Devine
- Richard H. Kirk
- Romulo Del Castillo
- Rival Consoles
- The Sabres of Paradise
- Secede
- Secret Mommy
- Seefeel
- Seekae
- Shigeto
- Skylab
- Solvent
- Speedy J
- Squarepusher
- Stendeck
- Steve Hauschildt
- Syndrone
- System 7
- Sun Electric
- Susumu Yokota
- Sweet Exorcist
- Sweet Trip
- Team Doyobi
- Telefon Tel Aviv
- The Tuss
- Thom Yorke
- Tim Hecker
- Tipper
- Trentemøller
- TRS-80
- Two Lone Swordsmen
- Tycho
- Ulrich Schnauss
- Universal Indicator
- Uwe Schmidt
- Vector Lovers
- Vegyn
- Venetian Snares
- Vulva
- Wagon Christ
- William Orbit
- XXYYXX
- Yppah
- Zoon van snooK
