= The Braindance Coincidence =

Compilation album by various artists
- Released: April 2, 2001
- Genre: Electronic, braindance
- Length: 76:32
- Label: Rephlex Records

Braindance chronology
The Braindance Coincidence (2001)	Rephlexions! An Album of Braindance! (2003)

Professional ratings
Review scores
Source	Rating
AllMusic	4.5/5 stars
City Pages	favorable
NME	4/5 stars
The Riverfront Times	mixed
Seattle Weekly	favorable
The Stranger	favorable

The Braindance Coincidence is a 2001 compilation album released by Rephlex Records.

== Background ==
Rephlex Records was founded in 1991 by Richard D. James (Aphex Twin) and Grant Wilson-Claridge. They coined the term "braindance", which was described by Wilson-Claridge as "a way of life" rather than a musical style. The record label launched the careers of μ-Ziq, Luke Vibert, and Squarepusher; introduced Mike Dred, Cylob, and DMX Krew; and revived material from 808 State and Baby Ford. To celebrate the 10th anniversary and over 100 releases, Rephlex Records released a 16-track compilation album of back catalog releases, titled The Braindance Coincidence, in 2001.

== Critical reception ==
Glenn Swan of AllMusic gave the album 4.5 stars out of 5, describing it as "stellar in scope, richly diverse, and a smart starting point for the curious." Rod Smith of City Pages said, "Although the songs are more low-budget than lo-fi, the home-studio sound celebrates Rephlex's pre-Powerbook, analog origins." Matt Corwine of Seattle Weekly commented that "they all share the laid back, low-fidelity aesthetic of the geeky, reclusive personalities that made them and the bedroom studios in which they were recorded." Nicolae White of The Stranger called it "a great starting point to see what's going on in the world of experimental electronic music."

== Track listing ==
No.	Title	Artist(s)	Length
1.	"Journey"	The Gentle People	4:09
2.	"Long Whiney"	Global Goon	3:54
3.	"Rewind"	Cylob	3:04
4.	"The Glass Room"	DMX Krew	2:29
5.	"Diagram VII (80's Mix)"	D'Arcangelo	5:18
6.	"Fortune Green"	Bochum Welt	3:20
7.	"Keith's Trumpets"	The Railway Raver	4:16
8.	"Normal (Helston Flora Remix by AFX)"	Baby Ford	6:51
9.	"Swan Vesta"	μ-Ziq	6:11
10.	"Happy Birdie! Sad Birdie!"	Vulva	5:41
11.	"(This Can) Robotic"	Vibert / Simmonds	5:39
12.	"Psultan (Squarepusher Mix)"	Chaos A.D.	6:47
13.	"Death to the Natives"	Bogdan Raczynski	2:51
14.	"Kymera"	Mike Dred / Peter Green	8:07
15.	"Don't Fall Asleep"	Leila	3:30
16.	"Afternoon Girl"	Ovuca	4:25
