= Rephlexions! An Album of Braindance! =

Compilation album by various artists
- Released: November 3, 2003
- Genre: Electronic, braindance
- Length: 74:28
- Label: Rephlex Records

Braindance chronology
The Braindance Coincidence (2001)	Rephlexions! An Album of Braindance! (2003)

Professional ratings
Review scores
Source	Rating
Drowned in Sound	9/10
Exclaim!	favorable
Stylus Magazine	B+
XLR8R	favorable

Rephlexions! An Album of Braindance! is a 2003 compilation album released by Rephlex Records.

== Critical reception ==
Heidi Chapson of Exclaim! said, "From electro to Squarepusher-esque drum & bass antics to melodic avant-gardism, the scope on this 19-track compilation is broad but cohesive, all presented in a timeless fashion." Dave Segal of Stylus Magazine gave the album a grade of B+, saying, "Rephlex remains one of the world's quirkiest and most inquisitive labels." Heath K. Hignight of XLR8R commented that "Bochum Welt's 'Radiopropulsive' and Yee-King's 'Goodnight Toby' are perfect examples of the Rephlex sound: a warp of perky melody and punchy acid feel that is at once culturally avant garde and musically retro."

== Track listing ==
No.	Title	Artist(s)	Length
1.	"Goodnight Toby"	Yee-King	5:09
2.	"Shipwreck"	D'Arcangelo	3:04
3.	"Smack 'Em Up Sharp"	Cylob	5:41
4.	"Radiopropulsive"	Bochum Welt	3:47
5.	"I'm All Alone"	DMX Krew	4:18
6.	"Avid Diva"	Pierre Bastien	4:22
7.	"A"	Leila	4:05
8.	"Bifidus"	Astrobotnia	4:03
9.	"Flex"	JP Buckle	2:37
10.	"Remember This"	Amen Andrews	5:40
11.	"There Are Many Things I Don't Understand but I Knew That I Loved You (But It's Too Late, You've Taken Me for Granted)"	Bogdan Raczynski	3:05
12.	"Proposal 5"	Ensemble	2:28
13.	"Fascinating"	Slipper	4:03
14.	"It Ain't Perfect Till It's Perfect"	Like A Tim	2:15
15.	"Emotion Heater (Tiki Mix)"	The Gentle People	4:22
16.	"Metel Buffalo"	Global Goon	3:31
17.	"In at the Beep End"	P.P.Roy	2:58
18.	"Bédé"	Robert Normandeau	2:58
19.	"Mangle 11 (Circuit Bent V.I.P. Mix)"	AFX	5:55
