= 26 Mixes for Cash =

2003 remix compilation album by Aphex Twin

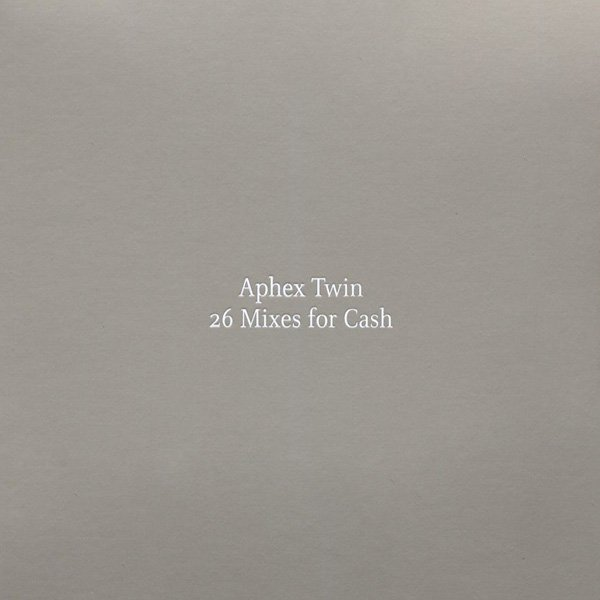

Remix album compilation by Aphex Twin
- Released: 24 March 2003
- Recorded: 1990–2003
- Genre: Electronica
- Length: 139:01
- Label: Warp Records
- Producer: Richard D. James

Richard D. James chronology
Drukqs (2001)	26 Mixes for Cash (2003)	Smojphace EP (2003)

Aphex Twin album chronology
Drukqs (2001)	26 Mixes for Cash (2003)	Chosen Lords (2006)

26 Mixes for Cash is a compilation album of remixes produced by Aphex Twin. Most of the remixes were produced for other artists between 1990 and 2003. It was released on 24 March 2003 by Warp Records.

== Background ==
Despite becoming a sought-after remixer during the 1990s, James admitted to not actually using the original source material in the case of some of his "remixes" for artists he disliked (such as Nine Inch Nails), explaining: "I never heard the originals...I don't want to, either." In some cases, he submitted his own original work, or the work of his flatmate Global Goon in place of his own work.

Along with the 22 remixes on this release, four original Aphex Twin tracks are also included. Two are new versions of previously released tracks: "Windowlicker, Acid Edit" and "SAW2 CD1 TRK2, Original Mix". The other two were previously available only on Further Down the Spiral, the remix album by Nine Inch Nails: "The Beauty of Being Numb Section B" and an edited version of "At the Heart of It All".

In addition to the remixes featured on this release, James has also remixed tracks by Beck, DJ Pierre, A Guy Called Gerald, The Bug, Street Side Boyz, Edward "Get Down" Crosby, Wagon Christ, and Soft Ballet, as well as additional remixes of tracks by Seefeel, Gavin Bryars, Jesus Jones, Saint Etienne, and Mescalinum United.

== Release ==
26 Mixes for Cash was released on CD only, although a vinyl promotional disc titled 2 Mixes on a 12" For Cash, featuring the two Aphex Twin originals exclusive to this compilation, was released in limited quantities in Japan only. Online orders of the compilation through Warp Records came with two silver-wrapped chocolate coins, featuring the Aphex Twin logo on one side and Richard's profile on the other (with "ELECTRONICA REX" written alongside it). The cover is by The Designers Republic.

James later clarified that the album was named 26 Remixes for Cash by the late Warp Records co-founder Rob Mitchell because James exchanged the remix DATs for cash in person to retain anonymity.

== Critical reception ==
Professional ratings
Review scores
Source	Rating
AllMusic	5/5 stars
Drowned in Sound	9/10
The Guardian	3/5 stars
The Independent	3/5 stars
Mojo	3/5 stars
NME	8/10
Pitchfork	7.7/10
Release Magazine	8/10
The Rolling Stone Album Guide	3/5 stars
Tiny Mix Tapes	3.5/5 stars

AllMusic states that the compilation "comprises some of the most creative, breathtaking music produced by anyone in electronica". NME wrote that "the more cash at stake the less effort Aphex puts into honouring the spirit of the artist – an often hilarious greenie in the face of pop careerism". Pitchfork states that "frustrating gestation period aside, many of the tracks here are certified classics, and it's nice to have them all in one place".

Fans have been critical of Warp's resorting to including tracks that were sourced from low bitrate mp3's, in a rush-job putting this compilation out, and also that many of the mixes included are shortened edits from their original versions.

== Track listing ==
Disc one
No.	Title	Remix of	Length
1.	"Time to Find Me, AFX Fast Mix"	Seefeel	7:34
2.	"Raising the Titanic, Big Drum Mix"	Gavin Bryars' 1994 recording of his 1969 The Sinking of the Titanic orchestral piece	8:42
3.	"Journey, Aphex Twin Care Mix"	The Gentle People	10:14
4.	"Triachus, Mix by Aphex Twin"	Kinesthesia, shorter edit than the original 5:21 version	4:12
5.	"Heroes, Aphex Twin Remix"	Philip Glass' orchestral version of David Bowie's "Heroes", mixed with samples of Bowie's singing from the original. Shorter edit than the original 5:33 version	5:18
6.	"In The Glitter Part 2, Aphex Twin Mix"	Buck-Tick	5:02
7.	"Zeros and Ones, Aphex Twin Reconstruction #2"	Jesus Jones	5:49
8.	"Ziggy, Aphex Twin Mix #1"	Nav Katze, shorter edit than the original 6:03 version	4:25
9.	"Your Head My Voice, Voix Revirement"	Saint Etienne, shorter edit than the original 4:12 version	3:15
10.	"Change, Aphex Twin Mix #2"	Nav Katze	4:16
11.	"Une Femme N'est Pas Un Homme, Aphex Twin Mix"	The Beatniks, shorter edit than the original 5:26 version	4:06
12.	"The Beauty of Being Numb Section B, Created by Aphex Twin"	an original track; the A section of "The Beauty of Being Numb" was "Mr. Self Destruct" remixed by Nine Inch Nails for their remix album Further Down the Spiral	3:27
13.	"Let My Fish Loose, Aphex Twin Remix"	Nobukazu Takemura	5:26
Total length:			71:46

Disc two
No.	Title	Remix of	Length
1.	"Krieger, Aphex Twin Baldhu Mix"	Die Fantastischen Vier	3:23
2.	"Deep in Velvet, Aphex Twin Turnips Mix"	Phillip Boa and the Voodooclub	3:50
3.	"Falling Free, Aphex Twin Remix"	Curve	7:40
4.	"We Have Arrived, Aphex Twin QQT Mix"	Mescalinum United	4:23
5.	"At the Heart of It All, Created by Aphex Twin"	created for the Nine Inch Nails remix album Further Down the Spiral, shorter edit than the original 7:14 version	3:49
6.	"Flow Coma, Remix By AFX"	808 State	5:00
7.	"Windowlicker, Acid Edit"	acid remix of the title track of Aphex Twin's "Windowlicker"	4:15
8.	"Normal, Helston Flora Remix by AFX"	Baby Ford	6:51
9.	"SAW2 CD1 TRK2, Original Mix"	alternate version of the track from Aphex Twin's Selected Ambient Works Volume II commonly known as "[radiator]" with added beats (was included in the 10 April 1995 edition of Peel Sessions)	6:30
10.	"Mindstream, The Aphex Twin Remix"	Meat Beat Manifesto, shorter edit than the original 6:57 version	3:42
11.	"You Can't Hide Your Love, Hidden Love Mix"	DMX Krew	5:05
12.	"Spotlight, Aphex Twin Mix"	Wagon Christ	6:57
13.	"Debase, Soft Palate"	Mike Flowers Pops	5:50
Total length:			67:15 139:01

== Charts ==
Chart performance for 26 Mixes for Cash
Chart (2003)	Peak position
French Albums (SNEP)	86
Scottish Albums (Official Charts)	54
UK Albums (Official Charts)	63
UK Independent Albums (Official Charts)	3
US Top Dance Albums (Billboard)	3
US Independent Albums (Billboard)	18
US Heatseekers Albums (Billboard)	29
