= Smojphace =

Smojphace EP

EP by AFX
- Released: 16 June 2003
- Genre: Noise; breakcore
- Length: 16:13
- Label: Rephlex Records MEN 2 MEN Records
- Producer: Richard D. James

Richard D. James chronology
26 Mixes for Cash (2003)	Smojphace EP (2003)	Analord (2005)

Professional ratings
Review scores
Source	Rating
AllMusic	2/5 stars
Drowned in Sound	9/10

Smojphace EP is an EP by the British electronic music artist Richard D. James under the alias AFX. It was released through MEN Records, a Rephlex Records sublabel in 2003.

Smojphace's first track is a remix of "Run The Place Red", a track produced by The Bug with vocals by Daddy Freddy. The remix is done in a breakcore style, before disintegrating into static noise near the end of the track. Both of the remaining "ktpa" electronic tracks consist of synthesized noise.

The entire disc is black, including the part that is read by the CD player. Likewise, the label is black on both sides of the 12" vinyl.

== Track listing ==
No.	Title	Length
1.	"Run the Place Red" (AFX Mix)	5:06
2.	"ktpa1"	7:29
3.	"ktpa2"	3:38

== See also ==
- Richard D. James discography
