= AB5 =

AB5 may refer to:

- AB5 toxin
- Abelian category
- Analogue Bubblebath 5, an unreleased album by Electronica artist Richard David James
- AB_{5}-type rare earth metal alloys used in nickel–metal hydride (NIMH) batteries
- SMC AB 5, a Wolf-Rayet star in the Small Magellanic Cloud
- AB-5, California Assembly Bill 5 (2019)
