= MFM =

MFM may refer to:

== Broadcasting ==
- MFM 92.6, a South African radio station based at Stellenbosch University
- MFM 97.1, former name of Heart Wirral, a local radio station in Birkenhead, UK
- MFM 103.4, former name of Marcher Sound, a UK radio station
- MFM Radio, a French radio station

== Computers ==
- Modified frequency modulation, a data encoding method used on floppy disks and older hard disks

== Other ==
- MFM, IATA airport code for Macau International Airport
- Magnetic force microscope, an atomic force microscope for examining samples of magnetic materials
- Margi South language (ISO 639: mfm), Chadic language of Nigeria
- Marine fuel management, techniques for efficient use of fuel by ships
- Material flow management, a method of efficiently managing materials
- Maternal–fetal medicine, the subspeciality of obstetrics that deals with high risk pregnancies.
- Measure for Measure, a play by Shakespeare.
- Melodies from Mars, an unreleased album by Richard David James under his pseudonym Afx
- MFM Records, Estonian record label
- Mountain of Fire and Miracles, an evangelical church in Nigeria
  - MFM F.C., football club owned by Mountain of Fire and Miracles
- Mpitolona ho an'ny Fandrosoan'i Madagasikara (Movement for the Progress of Madagascar), a Madagascar political party
- Multifunctional monitor, a flat-panel display with inputs for a variety of external video sources
- Multilevel flow modelling, a framework for modeling industrial processes
