= Dragan Espenschied =

Dragan Espenschied, aka drx
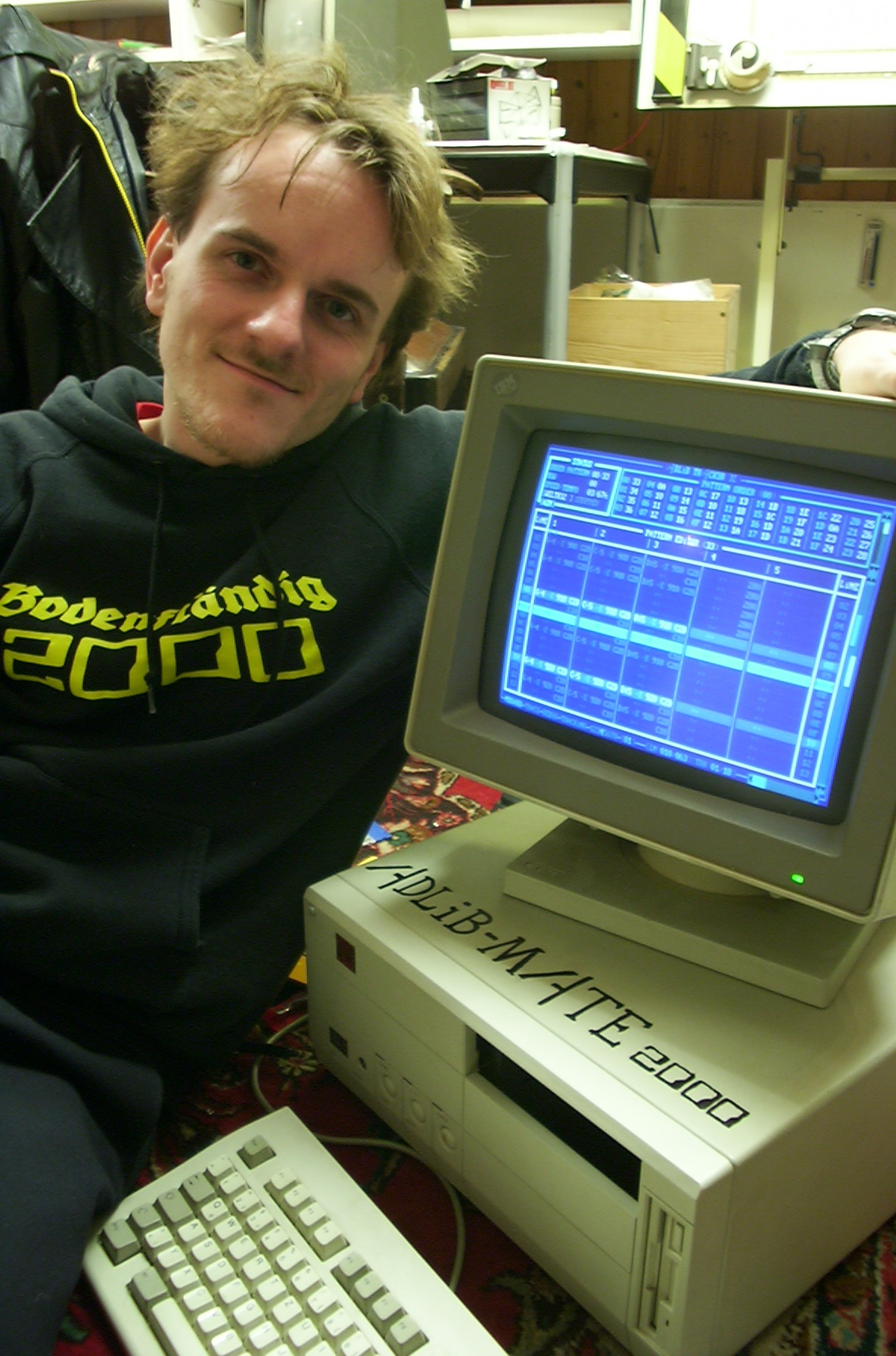
- Espenschied in 2000
- Born: 1975 (age 50–51); Stuttgart, West Germany
- Education: Merz Akademie Stuttgart
- Known for: 8 bit music, internet art
- Notable work: Bodenständig 2000, Assoziations-Blaster, insert_coin, Gravity, Freedom Phone, Zombie & Mummy, Frozen Niki
- Awards: Internet-Literaturpreis 1999 BW, Internationaler Medienkunstpreis 2001 by ZKM Karlsruhe, Webby Award 2003

Dragan Espenschied (born 1975) is an 8-bit musician and media artist who lives and works in New York City. He studied communication design at the Merz Academy in Stuttgart, Germany. Dragan started to develop software for Atari Computers in 1991.

In 1995 he founded the 8-bit band "Bodenständig 2000" together with Bernhard Kirsch. They got signed on the label Rephlex in London, and started touring throughout Europe and the USA. Together with media activist Alvar Freude he worked on projects like Freedom Phone, Omni-Cleaner, Assoziations-Blaster and insert_coin.

In 2003 he started working with the net.art pioneer Olia Lialina. Their most famous works are Zombie and Mummy, Online Newspapers, Frozen Niki, With Elements Of Web 2.0 and Midnight.

Since 2014, he is leading the Digital Art Conservation Program at Rhizome.
