= Melodies from Mars =

Unreleased album by Aphex Twin

Studio album by Aphex Twin
- Recorded: 1995
- Genre: Electronic
- Length: 45:25
- Producer: Richard D. James

Melodies from Mars is a collection of unreleased tracks by Richard David James, better known under the alias Aphex Twin. Although James did not admit authorship until 2010, it was known to fans as an unofficial Aphex Twin album because at least two of its tracks are alternate versions (possibly demo versions) of tracks featured on the subsequently released Richard D. James Album (1996). Some tracks also bear resemblance to those on Analogue Bubblebath 5. These tracks are thought to mark the beginning of a new phase in James's career, when he started composing music using computer software rather than on synthesizers and analogue equipment.

There are few places to find this album. It is commonly believed that Melodies from Mars was given to some of James' friends on cassette tapes. The Aphex Twin Community claims that "men in black suits" (people from Rephlex) asked it to remove MP3 excerpts from its website. An alternate version was illegally released in Russia by Unreal Records. It is missing the below-mentioned version of "Logan Rock Witch". The song title remains, but the audio is of another track: "Untitled 7".

In a 2010 interview with Another Man, James stated, "I've got six [albums] completed... one is Melodies from Mars, which I redid about three years ago." In 2014, he followed up by saying that Melodies from Mars would originally have been a double album, but, looking back, James found he had enough material for four albums. According to Mike Paradinas, their collaboration album Expert Knob Twiddlers was partially inspired by Melodies from Mars.

== Track listing ==
All tracks are written by Richard D James.

No.	Title	Length
1.	Untitled	3:19
2.	"Fingerbib" (alternative version)	4:16
3.	Untitled	2:20
4.	Untitled	4:14
5.	Untitled	5:14
6.	Untitled	3:52
7.	Untitled	4:04
8.	"Logan Rock Witch" (alternative version)	4:21
9.	Untitled	4:33
10.	Untitled	5:12
11.	Untitled	2:55
12.	Untitled	1:30

- The version of "Fingerbib" on Melodies from Mars is longer than the version on Richard D. James Album.
- The version of "Logan Rock Witch" is different than the version on Richard D. James Album.
- Track 12 features the same samples of pizzicato strings featured in "Girl/Boy Song" (track 9 on Richard D. James Album).

British animator David Firth has used several songs from Melodies from Mars in his animations:

- He acoustically covered track 10, and used track 1 as the theme music for his "Panathinaikos Bear" shorts.
- Versions of tracks 6 and 7 were used in the beginning of his animation "ALAN".
- A version of track 10 was used in his claymation short "Hollowhead".

== Personnel ==
- Richard D. James – synthesizer, producer
