= Vatican Nitez =

Studio album by Global Goon
- Released: 5 February 2002
- Genre: IDM
- Label: Rephlex Records
- Producer: Johnny Hawk

Global Goon chronology
Cradle of History (1998)	Vatican Nitez (2002)	Family Glue (2004)

Professional ratings
Review scores
Source	Rating
AllMusic	3/5 stars
Pitchfork	(7/10)

Vatican Nitez is an album by British musician Global Goon released on Rephlex Records.

== Track listing ==
1. "Business Man" – 3:28
2. "Jerky Dharma" – 3:47
3. "On The 73" – 4:54
4. "Kreem Ballet" – 5:35
5. "Ray Krebs Drives A Car" – 1:28
6. "Stan's Slaves" – 3:30
7. "!" – 3:09
8. "Crudulus" – 1:17
9. "Drugula" – 2:29
10. "Scott Cronce Is The CEO" – 4:22
11. "Globy Dubes, Champeen Of All Americky" – 5:13
