= Sound of the Street =

Studio album by DMX Krew
- Released: 1996
- Genre: Electropop
- Length: 49:56
- Label: Rephlex
- Producer: Ed Upton

DMX Krew chronology
| Sound of the Street (1996) | FFressshh! (1997) |

Professional ratings
Review scores
| Source | Rating |
|---|---|
| AllMusic | 2/5 stars |
| Muzik | 4/5 stars |

Sound of the Street is DMX Krew's debut album, released on Rephlex Records in 1996.

== Track listing ==
1. "Sound of the Street"
2. "Rock to the Beat"
3. "Dance to the Beat"
4. "Funky Feelin'"
5. "Sound of the DMX"
6. "Move My Body"
7. "Inside Your Mind"
8. "Emerging Technology"
9. "Rock Your Body 2"
10. "Anybody Out There?"
