= The Criminal Minds =

- Origin: Milton Keynes, Buckinghamshire, England
- Genres: British hip hop, breakbeat hardcore, jungle
- Years active: 1985–2001; 2023–present
- Labels: TCM, World Beat, White House, Labello Blanco, Rephlex, Fat Hop, Kniteforce
- Members: Zak
- Past members: DJ Halo; DJ Spatts; MC Iceski; Chase 1 Safe D CMD

The Criminal Minds are a British hip hop group first formed as a graffiti crew in Milton Keynes, England in 1985, who would later have success with breakbeat hardcore music during the peak of the early-mid 1990s British rave scene.

== History ==
The Criminal Minds were formed in 1985 as a graffiti crew in Milton Keynes by DJ Halo and graffiti artist Chase 1. Interested in hip hop, DJ Halo connected with MC Iceski in college and the pair began making demo tapes. Iceski's friend DJ Spatts would soon join, taking the crew into a new direction as a music group. After releasing some demo tapes and earning a growing following, they planned to release their first record by 1989, and added two new members, rappers Safe D and CMD. The group brought their first record to Eddie Richards, but were rejected. Undeterred, they self-funded and self-released their first mini-album Guilty as Charged in 1990, followed by the EP Tales from the Wasteland. Both were hailed within the UK hip hop scene for their rap delivery and clever and diverse use of samples. Fact would retrospectively describe their hip hop output as the "missing link" connecting the sounds of US hip hop to the UK sound system tradition and the rave music scene.

As the rave scene gained momentum from 1991, The Criminal Minds teamed up with local record shop owner and DJ Picci to fuse their hip hop style with breakbeat hardcore. The outcome was one of their most popular productions, Baptised by Dub, the first release on the influential hardcore jungle label White House Records. For the next few years, a solid release of breakbeat hardcore and early jungle releases would follow, but the new direction also meant that the MCs became sidelined as DJs Spatts and Halo focused on production. Further issues with sample clearance stifled their attempts to release their 1994 self-titled Criminal Minds album, which had been signed by a prominent label before being pulled after legal threats. Unable to legally release their music, the group took a break.

In 1996, the group released the limited edition EP Widowmaker for a run of 200 copies. In 1998, the partnership between DJ Spatts and DJ Halo came to an end and the two went their separate ways. DJ Spatts would focus on his group, Environmental Science, with collaborator Zak, signed to Skint Records, and collaborate with Zed Bias as E.S. Dubs. After a hiatus, The Criminal Minds regrouped to release an expanded version of their LP Widowmaker in 2001, under DJ Halo's new independent hip hop label, UK Rap Records. An anthology/compilation of The Criminal Minds early hip hop output was finally released in 2011 by Rephlex Records.

In recent years, The Criminal Minds has consisted of DJ Spatts and Zak, also featuring guests such as DJ Jerome Hill on new releases. Re-issues and remixes by other artists have been put out by Kniteforce Records. In 2023, the group signed a three album deal with Kniteforce, and released a new album, Genre Non Specific.

Founding member Ian Allen (DJ Spatts) died on 30 December 2023. The Prodigy's Liam Howlett remembered Spatts as "a legend of the old school rave scene" in an online post after his death.

== Discography ==
=== Albums ===
- Guilty as Charged (TCM Recordings, 1990)
- Mindbombing (Labello Blanco, 1993)
- Widowmaker (UK Rap Records, 2001)
- Genre Non Specific (Kniteforce, 2023)

=== Selected singles/EPs ===
- "Tales from the Wasteland" (TCM Recordings, 1991)
- "Baptised by Dub / Virtual Reality" (World Beat Records/White House, 1992)
- "A Vision of Dread / Playing with Spoons / Presence" (White House, 1992)
- "Re-baptised by Dub / Headhunter / Flynny's Theme" (White House, 1992)
- "Joyrider EP" (White House, 1993)
- "The Criminal" (White House, 1993)
- "Amen (Again)" (Section 12, 1994)

=== Compilations ===
- T.C.M. (Rephlex Records, 2011)

== See also ==
- British hip hop
- Breakbeat hardcore
