= DJ Stingray =

American DJ and producer

Sherard Ingram (DJ Stingray)
- Born: Detroit, Michigan
- Years Active: 1987- present
- Labels: Mo Wax- Pomelo- Designforms- Trust-Killekill- Shaddock-Decabret Records- WéMè Records - lower parts - TSAR

DJ Stingray, or Sherard Ingram, is an American electronic music producer and DJ from Detroit, Michigan. He is known as a prominent figure in Detroit’s techno and electro scene. He is the founder of Urban Tribe and an associate of legendary Detroit electro duo Drexciya. As both a DJ and producer, Ingram specializes in futuristic electro, preferring fast tempos and inventive beat patterns to more accessible, club-friendly rhythms. When asked to describe his style of electronic music, he prefers to classify it as Techno.

== Early life and education ==
Ingram was born and raised in Detroit, Michigan. As a teenager, he attended Crockett Vocational School. He took an interest in medicine and science, and he had aspirations of becoming a doctor.

After high school, Ingram worked at the Detroit Recording Institute before taking a position at Buy Rite Music, a Detroit record store. He began to become familiar with the Detroit music scene.

== Introduction to DJing ==
Ingram began DJing in the mid-1980, when he met Kenny Dixon Jr. (Moodymann). Ingram and Dixon began DJing together, eventually having a regular slot at The Outcast Club. There, Ingram developed his high-speed mixing style, incorporating techno tracks between Miami booty bass and West Coast hip-hop.

== Association with Drexciya ==
Ingram had kept a long friendship with James Stinson of Drexciya while working at the record shop Buy-Rite Music. Stinson invited him to serve as their official touring DJ in the late 1980s. It was Stinson himself who gave Ingram his stage name.

“Did I feel like a stingray? Never. But I wasn’t going to argue with James Stinson. I felt it and I understood what he wanted, because I understood the Drexciya legacy. I was Stingray from that day on.” — Sherard Ingram, DJ Mag, 2018

At that time, he also started to use his signature balaclava, which at first was supposed to be the same Underground Resistance mask used by the rest of the crew. Ingram quickly switched it out for a SWAT mask since it was more comfortable.

Following Stinson’s death in September 2002, Ingram removed the “Drexciyan” prefix from his name and has continued performing and recording as DJ Stingray or Stingray 313.

== Move to Berlin ==
After years of playing clubs and venues across Europe, Ingram eventually moved to Berlin, Germany. He has described what drew him to the city in his own words

I had friends here and the agency I was with was here as well. Also, it’s a robust electronic music and art scene, and the generally safe social climate made Berlin irresistible for me.” — Sherard Ingram, Playful Magazine, 2021

== Solo career ==
As a solo artist, Ingram has released records on WéMè Records (from 2007), Tresor, including the mix album Kern Vol. 4 (2017), and his own Micron Audio. His solo music moved toward Drexciya’s harder electro style, with releases including Aqua Team 2 (2008), F.T.N.W.O. (2012), and INDUSTRY 4.0 (2024).

He has worked with a wide range of artists and labels internationally, including the 2011 release Stingray Enters the Unknown on DJ Haus’s Unknown To The Unknown. His track titles include “Image Search,” “Fullbodyscan,” and “Psyops for Dummies,” which show his deep interest in technology, politics, and surveillance.

== Discography ==
=== Albums ===
- Aqua Team 2 (2008)
- F.T.N.W.O (2012)

=== EPs ===
- Aqua Team (2007)
- Drexciyan Connection (2009)
- Electronic Countermeasures (2011)
- Imping Is Easy EP (2012)
- Weaponized EP (2013)
- Imping Is Easy EP (2014)
- 002 (2015)
- Cognition (2015)
- Communications System (2015)
- NU-1000 (2016)
- 20in20b (2020)
- Molecular Level Solutions (2021)
- Industry 4.0 (2024)

=== Singles ===
- Soliton (2009)
- Stingray Enters the Unknown (2011)
- Assassin / Edges of a Vortex (2013)
- Tribal Life (2020)
- Good Love (2023)
