= The Shimmering Hour =

Studio album by Wisp
- Released: 2009
- Genre: IDM
- Length: 72:30
- Label: Rephlex

Wisp chronology
| Katabatic (2008) | The Shimmering Hour (2009) |

Professional ratings
Review scores
| Source | Rating |
|---|---|
| AllMusic | 3.5/5 stars |
| Drowned in Sound | 5/10 |
| PopMatters | 6/10 |

The Shimmering Hour is an album from the American IDM musician Wisp.

== Track listing ==
Side A

1. "Teddy Oggie" - 3:20
2. "Picatrix" - 5:31
3. "Keeper Of The Hills" - 6:00
4. "Flat Rock" - 3:47
5. "Seaway Trail" - 5:38
6. "Hexenringe" - 6:29
7. "Cultus Klatawa" - 6:32

Side B

1. "Katabatic" - 3:25
2. "Summoner's Hollow" - 7:02
3. "World Rim Walker" - 4:58
4. "The Shaper" - 3:22
5. "Hidebehind" - 5:02
6. "The Fire Above" - 6:34
7. "Winter of Flight" - 4:51
