= Pilote (musician) =

British musician

- Also known as: Richard Sands; Rarer and Bench; Route 24
- Born: Stuart Cullen; 14 December 1970 (age 55)
- Origin: Somerset, England
- Genres: Electronic; IDM; ambient; folk
- Years active: 1996–2016
- Labels: Curor Recordings; Series 500; Certificate 18 Electronic Projects; Kennington Records; Exalt Records; A Future Without; Domino; Micro Spiral
- Website: pilotemusic.com

Stuart Cullen (born 14 December 1970), originally known by the stage name Pilote, is a British musician. His 1990s and 2000s albums comprise mostly electronica and intelligent dance music, with a shift in focus to folk and bluegrass in the mid 2010s. The alias has been retired since 2016, with Cullen predominantly releasing music under the 'VeldHans' moniker since 2020, with fellow musician Jonathan Brown (Dusty Stray).

== Antenna (1999) ==
Pilote's first album, Antenna, was recorded in Brighton and released in 1999 on Certificate 18 Records. The album was supposedly made on "An old PC and a dodgy Yamaha". The first track on the LP, "Turtle", would in 2000 be remixed by Bonobo and appear in an advertising campaign for the now defunct phone company One2One.

== John Peel Session (2000) ==
On 2 August 2000, Pilote had his first and only session on the John Peel Show on BBC Radio 1. The recordings were direct from Cullen's studio.

== Doitnowman (2001) ==
Doitnowman is the second LP release from Pilote, recorded in Brighton and once again released with Certificate 18 records. Apparently, for the making of Doitnowman, Cullen had access to "more powerful computers". The album, though still not achieving widespread success, did enjoy critical acclaim from music magazines such as Brainwashed, whose writer Rob Devlin described it as "All in the interest of invoking a very pure, raw emotional response. And that, Cullen succeeds at beyond all doubt." The album also received a review in NME, roughly four years after its release.

The vinyl release of Doitnowman came with a bonus 10" featuring Bonobo's mix of "Turtle" from Pilote's previous album, Antenna, and Sirconical's remix of "Microphones", also from Antenna.

The American release CD, released with Domino Records, featured the track "Junior", track 3 on Pilote's 1999 EP "No Truck", as track 11.

== Discography ==
=== Albums ===
- Antenna (LP, 1999)
- Doitnowman (2001)
- Kingfood (2002)
- Pop Will Make Us Free (2007)
- Life Size Replica (2010)
- The Slowdown (2013)
- The Slowdown: Epilogue (2014)
- Libero (2016)

=== Singles and EPs ===
- "Testrach" / "Sapling" (single, 1996)
- "The Myth" / "Agent Gold" (single, 1998)
- Tonic (EP, 1999)
- No Truck (EP, 1999)
- "National Lottery" / "Jelly" (single, 1999)
- 3tothefloor (EP, 2000)
- Nelson (single, 2001)
- Manana Ep:01 (EP, 2002)
- Manana Ep:02 (EP, 2002)
- "Remover" / "Kratez" (online single, 2006)
- "By The River" / "Coltrane" (single, 2006)
- Two Chord Wonders (EP, 2007)
- Mudah Pecah EP (EP, 2008)
