= Analord =

EP series by Richard D. James
- Released: December 2004–July 2005
- Recorded: 2003–2005
- Genre: Acid techno
- Length: 11 EPs: Analord 01: 21:57; Analord 02: 23:11; Analord 03: 18:44; Analord 04: 18:25; Analord 05: 10:44; Analord 06: 22:58; Analord 07: 20:24; Analord 08: 20:04; Analord 09: 16:34; Analord 10: 12:53; Analord 11: 19:26; Total: 3:24:04
- Labels: Rephlex, ANALORD01 – ANALORD11
- Producer: Richard D. James

Richard D. James chronology
26 Mixes for Cash (2003)	Analord (2004)	Chosen Lords (2006)

Professional ratings
Review scores
Source	Rating
Pitchfork	Analord 1: (5.6/10)
Pitchfork	Analord 2: (6.0/10)
Pitchfork	Analord 3: (7.5/10)
Pitchfork	Analord 4: (7.0/10)
Pitchfork	Analord 5: (5.8/10)
Pitchfork	Analord 6: (6.3/10)
Pitchfork	Analord 7: (6.2/10)
Pitchfork	Analord 8: (6.7/10)
Pitchfork	Analord 9: (6.8/10)
Pitchfork	Analord 10: (7.6/10)
Pitchfork	Analord 11: (6.6/10)
Pitchfork	Series Average: (6.5/10)

Analord is a series of eleven 12" vinyl records by the electronic music artist Richard D. James, most of which are released under the alias AFX. The series, released in 2005, marked James's return to primarily analogue equipment following his computer-oriented programming work in the late 1990s. After their release, James "distilled" the 3½-hour, 42-track series into the 10-track compilation album Chosen Lords (2006), effectively his first full-length release since the 2001 album Drukqs.

On 24 December 2009 the Rephlex Records website began posting unreleased/bonus tracks for the Analord series in MP3 and WAV digital formats. In all, 21 bonus tracks were added to the series, totalling 62 tracks for a runtime of four hours and 36 minutes.

== History ==
The first installment, Analord 10, went on sale through the Rephlex Records website on 15 December 2004, and was packaged in a faux-leather binder with sleeves for housing the rest of the series. It was later re-released as a picture disc. Both pressings of Analord 10 were marketed under James' primary alias Aphex Twin, although other Analord recordings were released under the AFX pseudonym.

A condensed, album-length version of the series, Chosen Lords, was released in 2006.

== Musical equipment used ==
James has programmed a variety of analogue equipment throughout his career. Instruments on Analord include drum machines such as the Roland TR-606, TR-808, and TR-909; sequencers such as the Roland MC-4; and various synthesizers and polysynths, including the Roland SH-101 and Roland TB-303, a Synton Fenix Modular.

== Allusions ==
- Tracks on Analord 8, Analord 9, and Analord 11 are named after computer viruses and other malicious software.
- The images on both sides of Analord 11 feature the Michael Faraday Memorial in Elephant and Castle, London (which is near the disused bank Richard D. James owns).
- Both sides of Analord 1 feature the Roland MC-4 Microcomposer as the label art.
- Side B of "Analord 4" has a Halibut's eye as the label art, connecting with the track "Halibut Acid".

== Track listing ==
=== Analord 1 ===
Released 24 January 2005.

Analord 1
No.	Title	Length
1.	"Steppingfilter 101"	4:45
2.	"Canticle Drawl"	1:45
3.	"MC-4 Acid"	3:47
4.	"Bubble 'n' Squeek 2" (Untitled until December 2009 reissue)	1:31
5.	"Where's Your Girlfriend?"	5:06
6.	"Grumpy Acid"	3:21
7.	"Analord 158b"	1:40

Analord 1 bonus tracks
No.	Title	Length
8.	"Canticle Drawl" (Alternate Version)	0:36
9.	"Where's Your Girlfriend" (Another Version)	3:36

=== Analord 2 ===
Released 24 January 2005.

Analord 2
No.	Title	Length
1.	"Phonatacid"	9:47
2.	"Laricheard"	2:15
3.	"Pissed Up in SE1"	5:14
4.	"Bwoon Dub"	5:56

Analord 2 bonus track
No.	Title	Length
5.	"Carnival Acid"	3:32

=== Analord 3 ===
Released 21 February 2005.

Analord 3
No.	Title	Length
1.	"Boxing Day"	6:36
2.	"Midievil Rave 1"	2:44
3.	"Klopjob"	5:24
4.	"Midievil Rave 2"	4:00

Analord 3 bonus track
No.	Title	Length
5.	"Stabbij"	4:21

=== Analord 4 ===
Released 21 February 2005.

Analord 4
No.	Title	Length
1.	"Crying in Your Face"	4:23
2.	"Home Made Polysynth"	4:07
3.	"Halibut Acid"	6:07
4.	"Breath March"	3:46

Analord 4 bonus tracks
No.	Title	Length
5.	"Flutternozzle"	6:28
6.	"In the Maze Park"	1:31
7.	"Halibut Acid" (Original Mix)	4:35

=== Analord 5 ===
Released 14 March 2005.

Analord 5
No.	Title	Length
1.	"Reunion 2"	5:10
2.	"Cilonen"	5:34

Analord 5 bonus tracks
No.	Title	Length
3.	"Gong Acid"	3:05
4.	"Reunion 2" (Alternative Version)	6:23

=== Analord 6 ===
Released 11 April 2005.

Analord 6
No.	Title	Writer(s)	Length
1.	"Batine Acid"		5:26
2.	"Snivel Chew"		4:02
3.	"I'm Self Employed"		4:26
4.	"2 Analogue Talks" (Split into two tracks on December 2009 reissue): "Analogue Talk (Claknib)"; "Analogue Talk (Chorus 3)"		1:45: 0:57; 0:52
5.	"Analoggins"	Captain Voafose and Smojphace	7:17

Analord 6 bonus tracks
No.	Title	Length
6.	"Bodmin 1"	4:36
7.	"Bodmin 2"	4:17
8.	"Bodmin 3"	5:26

=== Analord 7 ===
Released 25 April 2005.

Analord 7
No.	Title	Length
1.	"Lisbon Acid"	8:29
2.	"Pitcard"	6:18
3.	"AFX Acid 04"	5:37

Analord 7 bonus track
No.	Title	Length
4.	"Wabby Acid"	3:33

aphextwin.warp.net bonus track
No.	Title	Length
5.	"lisbon acid unedited original live version"	8:32

=== Analord 8 ===
Released 9 May 2005.

Analord 8
No.	Title	Length
1.	"PWSteal.Ldpinch.D"	3:44
2.	"Backdoor.Berbew.Q"	4:57
3.	"W32.Deadcode.A"	6:18
4.	"Backdoor.Spybooter.A"	5:06

Analord 8 bonus track
No.	Title	Length
5.	"Backdoor.Berbew.Q" (Tollwedgechord Mix)	4:59

=== Analord 9 ===
Released 13 June 2005.

Analord 9
No.	Title	Length
1.	"PWSteal.Bancos.Q"	4:50
2.	"Trojan.KILLAV.E"	3:03
3.	"W32.Aphex@mm"	3:52
4.	"Backdoor.Netshadow"	4:49

Analord 9 bonus track
No.	Title	Length
5.	"Liptons B Acid"	5:47

=== Analord 10 ===
Released 15 December 2004 and credited to Aphex Twin rather than AFX. Re-released as a picture disc on 11 July 2005.

Analord 10
No.	Title	Length
1.	"Fenix Funk 5"	4:58
2.	"Xmd 5a"	7:55

=== Analord 11 ===
Released 13 June 2005.

Analord 11
No.	Title	Length
1.	"W32.Mydoom.AU@mm"	8:47
2.	"VBS.Redlof.B"	4:39
3.	"Backdoor.Ranky.S: Backdoor.Ranky.S 5; Backdoor.Ranky.S 4; " (split into two tracks on the 2009 reissue)	6:00: 4:08; 2:29

Analord 11 bonus tracks
No.	Title	Length
4.	"Not Disturbing Mammoth 1" (Mono)	2:05
5.	"Not Disturbing Mammoth 2" (Mono)	2:00
6.	"Love 7"	4:45
7.	"3 Notes Con"	4:54
8.	"VBS.Redlof.B" (Bass Version)	3:28

^{*} Released on 24 December 2009; only available through download.
