= Chosen Lords =

Compilation album by AFX / Aphex Twin
- Released: 10 April 2006
- Recorded: 2003–2005
- Genres: Acid techno; IDM
- Length: 56:39
- Labels: Rephlex, CAT173CD
- Producer: Richard D. James

AFX chronology
Analord (2005)	Chosen Lords (2006)	Caustic Window (2014)

Professional ratings
Aggregate scores
Source	Rating
Metacritic	81/100
Review scores
Source	Rating
AllMusic	4.5/5 stars
The Guardian	4/5 stars
Mojo	4/5 stars
NME	7/10
Pitchfork	7.9/10
PopMatters	8/10
Q	4/5 stars
Spin	A−
Uncut	4/5 stars
URB	4.5/5 stars

Chosen Lords is a compilation album by Richard D. James, released under the aliases AFX and Aphex Twin. It is a CD compilation of selected tracks previously released on the vinyl-only Analord series. Limited edition copies distributed with a poster were offered on Warpmart to encourage pre-ordering.

Eight of the 10 tracks are under the "AFX" moniker, while "Fenix Funk 5" and "XMD 5a" are under the Aphex Twin alias.

Chosen Lords reached #82 on the UK Albums Chart.

== Reception ==
Initial critical response to Chosen Lords was positive. At Metacritic, which assigns a normalized rating out of 100 to reviews from mainstream critics, the album has received an average score of 81, indicating "universal acclaim", based on 19 reviews.

== Track listing ==
All music is composed by Richard D James.

No.	Title	From the Analord EP Series	Length
1.	"Fenix Funk 5"	Analord 10	5:06
2.	"Reunion 2"	Analord 05	5:15
3.	"Pitcard"	Analord 07	6:25
4.	"Crying in Your Face"	Analord 04	4:29
5.	"Klopjob"	Analord 03	5:32
6.	"Boxing Day"	Analord 03	6:50
7.	"Batine Acid"	Analord 06	5:34
8.	"Cilonen"	Analord 05	5:42
9.	"PWSteal.Ldpinch.D"	Analord 08	3:48
10.	"XMD 5a"	Analord 10	7:58
Total length:			56:49
