= Aleksi Perälä =

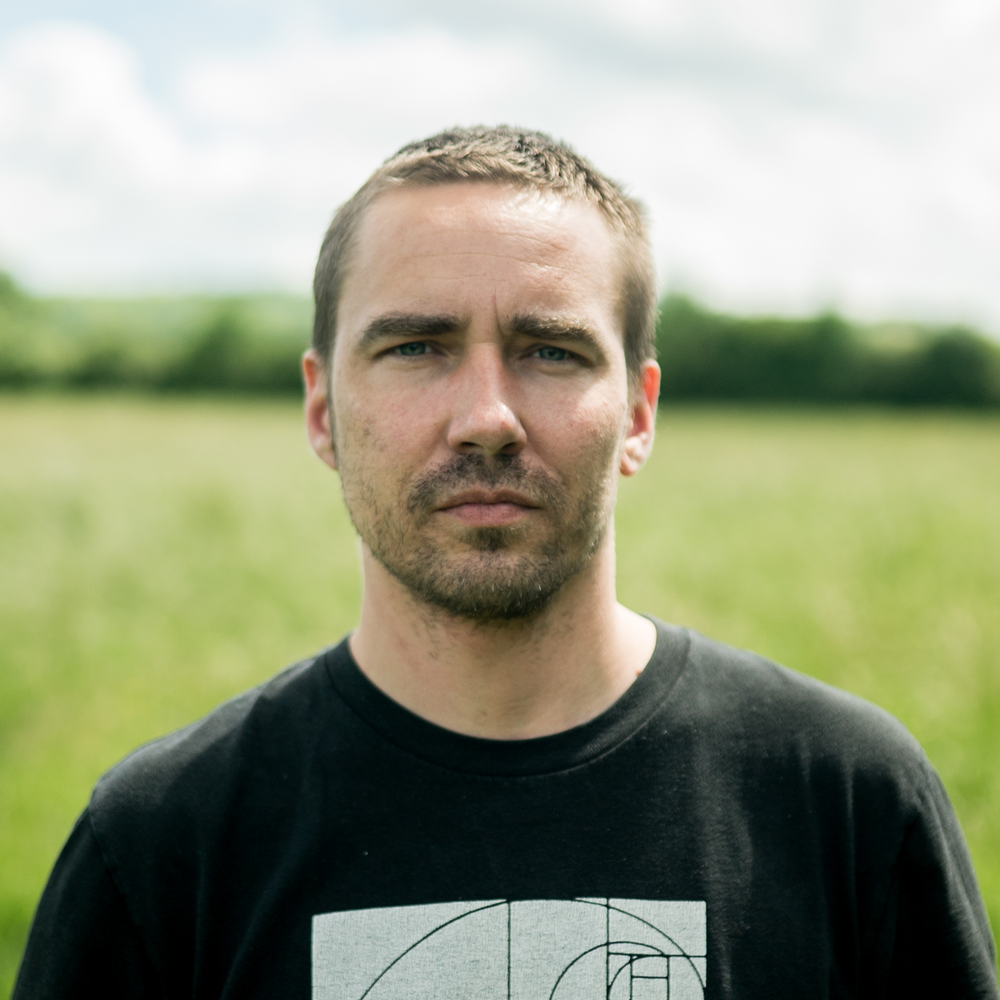
- Aleksi Perälä in South Gloucestershire, UK.

Background information
- Also known as: Ovuca, Astrobotnia
- Born: Aleksi Kristian Perälä; 1976 (age 49–50)
- Origin: Vantaa, Finland
- Genres: Microtonal, Braindance, Ambient, Breakbeat, Experimental, Drum and Bass, Techno
- Occupations: Music composer, producer
- Years active: 1990 - present
- Labels: Rephlex, Clone Records, Alleviated Records, AP Musik

Aleksi Perälä (born 1976) is a Finnish electronic music composer and producer. He has made music since 1988, and performed it live since 1996, switching between hardware and software over the years.

== Early life and education ==
Perälä's first reported interest in sound was at the age of 3, by the echoes in the Helsinki Central railway Station. In 1983, he started taking piano lessons, until he discovered electronic music on Finnish radio during the Second Summer of Love phenomenon in 1988. He taped music from the radio, and experimented with his synthesiser to "fill the gaps" left by the lack of electronic music that could be heard just over the radio.

Whilst being an exchange student in Michigan, Perälä first heard of Aphex Twin (Richard D. James) in the Autumn of 1993, and then heard Aphex Twin's "Selected Ambient Works Volume II" the following year. Perälä also found out about Rephlex; Richard D. James's own record label. This initiated Perälä to move back to Finland, and send demo tapes to Rephlex. He was signed onto Rephlex in 1999, starting his career in music.

In 2008, he obtained a music technology degree from Salpaus College.

== Musical career and release style ==
Perälä has a prolific musical career with over 150 full-length album releases spanning various electronic music genres. He has often released his music on unconventional formats including:

- Audio DVD ("Colundi Sequence Level 1 and 2")
- Surround sound DVD ("Colundi Sequence Level 17.5")
- USB card ("Colundi Sequence Level 4")
- Cassette ("Colundi Sequence Level 6 and 17.3")
- Minidisc ("Colundi Sequence Level 7 and 17.4")
- Vinyl postcard ("Colundi Sequence Level 17.1")
- Wire recording ("Colundi Sequence Level 8")
- A piece of land, attempted through crowdfunding ("Colundi Sequence Level 9")

In 1999, he signed with Rephlex Records and released his debut album Lactavent' under the name Ovuca. He was a regular braindance act alongside other Rephlex artists such as Aphex Twin, Bogdan Raczynski, Ed DMX and Luke Vibert, touring on the Warp Magic Bus and in the USA.

His collaboration with British braindance artist Cylob led to the release of Cylobotnia, published on Rephlex Records in 2003.

In 2011, Perälä founded AP Musik, a sublabel of Rephlex. It was during this period that he began incorporating colundi frequencies into his music, releasing it through this label. Colundi is a term referring to 128 sound frequencies discovered and curated by Rephlex co-founder Grant Wilson-Claridge. Bandcamp published an article entitled “Colundi” is Music Tuned to Frequencies That Heal the Body". The official website once claimed: “We fail to reliably express our precise thoughts and intentions using words. Consequently, you may fail to understand us. We apologise for the effects of such misunderstanding.”

Perälä's output has been a result of his experimentation with this unique system.

His music often features intricate melodic patterns and unconventional rhythmic structures, and is often released in album format organised into different series, each relating to a specific theme, usually inspired by nature. The artwork is often photography of Finnish nature, which he says has influenced his music.

In 2021, Perälä received a two-year grant from the Kone Foundation, leading to a substantial volume of full-length albums released on a frequent bi-weekly or weekly basis. The grant's research focuses on additive synthesis while exploring various elements of world music. His work primarily involves sampling objects from his surroundings and replacing the partials with colundi frequencies. The ratios of the sound partials are influenced by natural patterns and real-world instruments, drawing inspiration from constants and sequences found throughout nature—such as phi, pi, and the Fibonacci–Pingala sequence.

The artist's prolific output has led him to forgo conventional track titles in favour of using ISRC codes, a practical approach to managing the vast number of tracks he produces.

He has produced remixes for many artists, including Larry Heard.

== Discography ==
=== Albums ===
Title	Alias	Release	Label
Lactavent	Ovuca	1999	Rephlex
Lactavent Outtakes	Ovuca	1999	[Self-released, AP Musik 2021]
Onclements	Ovuca	2000	Rephlex
Onclements Outtakes	Ovuca	2000	[Self-released, AP Musik 2022]
King Stacey	Ovuca	2000	Rephlex
Wasted Sunday	Ovuca	2001	Rephlex
Astrobotnia Part 1	Astrobotnia	2002	Rephlex
Astrobotnia Part 3	Astrobotnia	2002	Rephlex
Cylobotnia	Astrobotnia & Cylob	2002	Rephlex
Project V	Aleksi Perälä	2007	Rephlex
Boomblaster	Aleksi Perälä	2009	Rephlex
Mental Union 1	Aleksi Perälä	2009	Rephlex
Mental Union 2	Aleksi Perälä	2009	Rephlex
Short Attention Span	Ovuca	2011	AP Musik
Astrobotnia Part 00	Astrobotnia	2011	AP Musik
Mental Union 3	Aleksi Perälä	2013	Rephlex
Mental Union 4	Aleksi Perälä	2014	AP Musik
Ovuca Bonus	Aleksi Perälä	2014	AP Musik
The Colundi Sequence Level 1	Aleksi Perälä	2014	AP Musik
The Colundi Sequence Level 2	Aleksi Perälä	2014	AP Musik
The Colundi Sequence Level 3	Aleksi Perälä	2014	AP Musik
The Colundi Sequence Level 4	Aleksi Perälä	2014	AP Musik
The Colundi Sequence Level 5	Aleksi Perälä	2014	AP Musik
The Colundi Sequence Level 6	Aleksi Perälä	2014	AP Musik
The Colundi Sequence Level 7	Aleksi Perälä	2014	AP Musik
The Colundi Sequence Level 8	Aleksi Perälä	2015	AP Musik
The Colundi Sequence Level 10	Aleksi Perälä	2015	AP Musik
The Colundi Sequence Level 11	Aleksi Perälä	2015	AP Musik
The Colundi Sequence Level 12	Aleksi Perälä	2015	AP Musik
The Colundi Sequence Level 13	Aleksi Perälä	2015	AP Musik
The Colundi Sequence Level 14	Aleksi Perälä	2015	AP Musik
The Colundi Sequence Level 15	Aleksi Perälä	2015	AP Musik
The Colundi Sequence Level 16	Aleksi Perälä	2016	AP Musik
Connection	Aleksi Perälä	2016	AP Musik
Contact	Aleksi Perälä	2016	AP Musik
Unknown	Aleksi Perälä	2016	AP Musik
Simulation X	Aleksi Perälä	2017	Clone Basement Series
Simulation	Aleksi Perälä	2017	Clone Basement Series
LF RMX 004	Aleksi Perälä	2017	LF RMX
Paradox	Aleksi Perälä	2018	Trip
The Colundi Sequence Volume 3	Aleksi Perälä	2018	AP Musik
The Colundi Sequence Level 17.1	Aleksi Perälä	2018	AP Musik
The Colundi Sequence Level 17.2	Aleksi Perälä	2018	AP Musik
The Colundi Sequence Level 17.3	Aleksi Perälä	2018	AP Musik
The Colundi Sequence Level 17.4	Aleksi Perälä	2018	AP Musik
The Colundi Sequence Level 17.5	Aleksi Perälä	2018	AP Musik
Sunshine EP	Aleksi Perälä	2018	Dub Recordings
Sunshine 2	Aleksi Perälä	2018	AP Musik
Sunshine 3	Aleksi Perälä	2018	Dub Recordings
Moonshine	Aleksi Perälä	2018	AP Musik
Starlight 1	Aleksi Perälä	2018	AP Musik
Starlight 2	Aleksi Perälä	2018	AP Musik
Starlight 3	Aleksi Perälä	2018	AP Musik
Presence	Aleksi Perälä	2019	AP Musik
Resonance	Aleksi Perälä	2019	Trip
Spectrum 0	Aleksi Perälä	2020	AP Musik
Spectrum 1	Aleksi Perälä	2020	AP Musik
Spectrum 2	Aleksi Perälä	2020	AP Musik
Spectrum 3	Aleksi Perälä	2020	AP Musik
Spectrum 4	Aleksi Perälä	2020	AP Musik
Spectrum 5	Aleksi Perälä	2020	AP Musik
Spectrum 6	Aleksi Perälä	2020	AP Musik
Spectrum 7	Aleksi Perälä	2020	AP Musik
Oscillation 1	Aleksi Perälä	2020	Clone Basement Series
Oscillation 2	Aleksi Perälä	2020	Dub Recordings
Midnight Sun 1	Aleksi Perälä	2020	AP Musik
Midnight Sun 2 A	Aleksi Perälä	2020	AP Musik
Midnight Sun 2 B	Aleksi Perälä	2020	AP Musik
Midnight Sun 3	Aleksi Perälä	2020	AP Musik
Midnight Sun 4 A	Aleksi Perälä	2021	AP Musik
Midnight Sun 4 B	Aleksi Perälä	2021	AP Musik
Midnight Sun 5 A	Aleksi Perälä	2021	AP Musik
Midnight Sun 5 B	Aleksi Perälä	2021	AP Musik
Midnight Sun 5 C	Aleksi Perälä	2021	AP Musik
Midnight Sun 6	Aleksi Perälä	2021	AP Musik
Northern Lights α Dubhe	Ovuca	2021	AP Musik
Northern Lights β Merak I	Ovuca	2021	AP Musik
Northern Lights β Merak II	Ovuca	2021	AP Musik
Northern Lights γ Phecda	Ovuca	2021	AP Musik
Northern Lights ε Alioth	Ovuca	2021	AP Musik
Northern Lights ζ Mizar	Ovuca	2021	AP Musik
Northern Lights ζ Alcor	Ovuca	2021	AP Musik
Phantasia I	Aleksi Perälä	2021	AP Musik
Phantasia II	Aleksi Perälä	2021	AP Musik
Phantasia III	Aleksi Perälä	2021	AP Musik
Phantasia IV	Aleksi Perälä	2021	AP Musik
Phantasia V	Aleksi Perälä	2021	AP Musik
Phantasia VI	Aleksi Perälä	2021	AP Musik
Phantasia VII	Aleksi Perälä	2021	AP Musik
Phantasia VIII	Aleksi Perälä	2021	AP Musik
Phantasia IX	Aleksi Perälä	2021	AP Musik
Phantabla I	Aleksi Perälä	2021	AP Musik
Phantabla II	Aleksi Perälä	2021	AP Musik
Phantabla III	Aleksi Perälä	2021	AP Musik
CYCLES 1 日	Aleksi Perälä	2021	AP Musik
CYCLES 2 月	Aleksi Perälä	2022	AP Musik
CYCLES 3 星辰	Aleksi Perälä	2022	AP Musik
CYCLES 4 山	Aleksi Perälä	2022	AP Musik
CYCLES 5 龍	Aleksi Perälä	2022	AP Musik
CYCLES 6 鳳凰	Aleksi Perälä	2022	AP Musik
CYCLES 7 宗彝	Aleksi Perälä	2022	AP Musik
CYCLES 8 藻	Aleksi Perälä	2022	AP Musik
CYCLES 9 火	Aleksi Perälä	2022	AP Musik
CYCLES 10 粉米	Aleksi Perälä	2022	AP Musik
CYCLES 11 黼	Aleksi Perälä	2022	AP Musik
CYCLES 12 黻	Aleksi Perälä	2022	AP Musik
UNITY ǀ	Aleksi Perälä	2022	AP Musik
UNITY ǀǀ	Aleksi Perälä	2022	AP Musik
UNITY ǀǀǀ	Aleksi Perälä	2022	AP Musik
UNITY ǀǀ ǀǀ	Aleksi Perälä	2022	AP Musik
UNITY ǀǀǀ ǀǀ	Aleksi Perälä	2022	AP Musik
UNITY ǀǀǀ ǀǀǀ	Aleksi Perälä	2022	AP Musik
UNITY ǀǀǀǀ ǀǀ	Aleksi Perälä	2022	AP Musik
UNITY ǀǀǀǀ ǀǀǀǀ	Aleksi Perälä	2022	AP Musik
UNITY ǀǀǀ ǀǀǀ ǀǀǀ	Aleksi Perälä	2022	AP Musik
ALITHIA A'	Aleksi Perälä	2023	AP Musik
ALITHIA B'	Aleksi Perälä	2023	AP Musik
ALITHIA Γ''	Aleksi Perälä	2023	AP Musik
ALITHIA Δʹ	Aleksi Perälä	2023	AP Musik
ALITHIA E'	Aleksi Perälä	2023	AP Musik
GAIA 1	Aleksi Perälä	2023	AP Musik
GAIA 2	Aleksi Perälä	2023	AP Musik
GAIA 3	Aleksi Perälä	2023	AP Musik
GAIA 4	Aleksi Perälä	2023	AP Musik
GAIA 5	Aleksi Perälä	2023	AP Musik
GAIA 6	Aleksi Perälä	2023	AP Musik
GAIA 7	Aleksi Perälä	2023	AP Musik
GAIA 8	Aleksi Perälä	2023	AP Musik
GAIA 9	Aleksi Perälä	2023	AP Musik
GAIA 10	Aleksi Perälä	2023	AP Musik
GAIA 11	Aleksi Perälä	2023	AP Musik
GAIA 12	Aleksi Perälä	2023	AP Musik
GAIA 13	Aleksi Perälä	2023	AP Musik
GAIA 14	Aleksi Perälä	2023	AP Musik
GAIA 15	Aleksi Perälä	2023	AP Musik
CHILDREN OF LIGHT 1	Aleksi Perälä	2024	AP Musik
CHILDREN OF LIGHT 2	Aleksi Perälä	2024	AP Musik
CHILDREN OF LIGHT 3	Aleksi Perälä	2024	AP Musik
CHILDREN OF LIGHT 4	Aleksi Perälä	2024	AP Musik
CHILDREN OF LIGHT 5	Aleksi Perälä	2024	AP Musik
CHILDREN OF LIGHT 6	Aleksi Perälä	2024	AP Musik
CHILDREN OF LIGHT 7	Aleksi Perälä	2024	AP Musik
CHILDREN OF LIGHT 8	Aleksi Perälä	2024	AP Musik
CHILDREN OF LIGHT 9	Aleksi Perälä	2024	AP Musik
CHILDREN OF LIGHT 10	Aleksi Perälä	2024	AP Musik
CHILDREN OF LIGHT 11	Aleksi Perälä	2024	AP Musik
CHILDREN OF LIGHT 12	Aleksi Perälä	2024	AP Musik
CHILDREN OF LIGHT 13	Aleksi Perälä	2024	AP Musik
CHILDREN OF LIGHT 14	Aleksi Perälä	2024	AP Musik
CHILDREN OF LIGHT 15	Aleksi Perälä	2024	AP Musik
CHILDREN OF LIGHT 16	Aleksi Perälä	2024	AP Musik
Waves	Aleksi Perälä	2024	AP Musik
Cycles	Aleksi Perälä	2024	Repetitive Rhythm Research
Vortex 2	Aleksi Perälä	2025	AP Musik
Vortex 3	Aleksi Perälä	2025	AP Musik
Vortex 4	Aleksi Perälä	2025	AP Musik
GRACE 1	Aleksi Perälä	2025	AP Musik
GRACE 2	Aleksi Perälä	2025	AP Musik
GRACE 3	Aleksi Perälä	2025	AP Musik
GRACE 4	Aleksi Perälä	2025	AP Musik
GRACE 5	Aleksi Perälä	2025	AP Musik
GRACE 6	Aleksi Perälä	2025	AP Musik
GRACE 7	Aleksi Perälä	2025	AP Musik
GRACE 8	Aleksi Perälä	2025	AP Musik
GRACE 9	Aleksi Perälä	2025	AP Musik
GRACE 10	Aleksi Perälä	2025	AP Musik
GRACE 11	Aleksi Perälä	2025	AP Musik
GRACE 12	Aleksi Perälä	2025	AP Musik
GRACE 13	Aleksi Perälä	2025	AP Musik
GRACE 14	Aleksi Perälä	2025	AP Musik
GRACE 15	Aleksi Perälä	2025	AP Musik
Cycles 0	Aleksi Perälä	2025	AP Musik
Vortex 1	Aleksi Perälä	2025	Dub Recordings, Repetitive Rhythm Research
Dream	Aleksi Perälä	2026	AP Musik
Rays	Aleksi Perälä	2026	AP Musik
Vibrations	Aleksi Perälä	2026	AP Musik
Radiance	Aleksi Perälä	2026	AP Musik
Incandescence	Aleksi Perälä	2026	AP Musik

=== EPs ===
Title	Alias	Release	Label
King Stacey	Ovuca	2000	Rephlex
Astrobotnia Part 2	Astrobotnia	2002	Rephlex
Midnight Sun 4 EP-1	Aleksi Perälä	2021	AP Musik
Midnight Sun 4 EP-2A	Aleksi Perälä	2021	AP Musik
Midnight Sun 4 EP-2B	Aleksi Perälä	2021	AP Musik
Midnight Sun 4 EP-3	Aleksi Perälä	2021	AP Musik
Midnight Sun 4 EP-4	Aleksi Perälä	2021	AP Musik
Midnight Sun 4 EP-5	Aleksi Perälä	2021	AP Musik
Northern Lights δ Megrez	Ovuca	2021	AP Musik

=== Compilation albums ===
Title	Alias	Release	Label
The Colundi Sequence Volume 1	Aleksi Perälä	2016	Clone Records
The Colundi Sequence Volume 2	Aleksi Perälä	2016	AP Musik
Spectrum Analysis	Aleksi Perälä	2016	Repetitive Rhythm Research
The Colundi Sequence Volume 3	Aleksi Perälä	2019	AP Musik

=== Remixes ===
Song title	Alias	Released on	Date released
"Hoksottimet Hoksottimet"	Ovuca	MGRS-RMXS (Migros-Kulturprozent)	2001
"Hit The Gas"	Ovuca	Output 64 - Delete All Data (Enduro)	2001
"1976 (Ovuca's Painless Art Mix)"	Ovuca	Psi Performer - Art Is A Division Of Pain (Remixed – Part 1)	2001
" Manhunt (Remixes #1, #2 and #3 by Aleksi Perälä)"	Aleksi Perälä	Craig Connor – Manhunt Remixes - Rockstar Games	2003
"Seclusion Two"	Aleksi Perälä	Antonio Ruscito – Seclusion Of The Human Being	2017
"Claudio PRC– Nitido (Aleksi Perälä Remix)"	Aleksi Perälä	Svreca – Arquitectura Del Sueño	2017
"Inner Acid (Aleksi Perälä Remix)"	Aleksi Perälä	Mr. Fingers – Inner / Outer Acid (Remixes)	2018
"Outer Acid (Aleksi Perälä Remix)"	Aleksi Perälä	Mr. Fingers – Inner / Outer Acid (Remixes)	2018

=== Compilation appearances ===
Song title	Alias	Released on	Date released
"Hulva"	Ovuca	Avanto-00 - Avanto Recordings	2000
"FI3AC1927140"	Aleksi Perälä	Mysteries Compilation - Chapter One	2020
"UK74R1721101"	Aleksi Perälä	Sonic Transmutations	2023
"FI3AC2142060 (Chris Callahan Edit)"	Ovuca	Sonic Transmutations	2023
