= Daisuke Tanabe =

Japanese electronic musician and producer

- Born: Hyōgo Prefecture, Japan
- Genres: Electronic; intelligent dance music (IDM); jungle
- Occupations: Musician; music producer
- Years active: 2007–present

Daisuke Tanabe (Japanese: 田辺 大輔, Tanabe Daisuke) is a Japanese electronic musician and record producer, known for his work in the styles of intelligent dance music (IDM) and jungle.

== Early life ==
Tanabe was born in Hyōgo Prefecture, Japan, and moved around the country during his childhood before settling in Chiba Prefecture. As of 2014, he still resides in Chiba Prefecture, in the city of Kashiwa.

== Career ==
Tanabe has described himself as having "[fidgeted] with shitty synths" prior to the age of 15, before discovering artists associated with the British Warp record label and the UK electronica scene.

In 2010, Tanabe released his debut album, Before I Forget. That same year, Tanabe met UK-based dance/electronica producer Kidkanevil as participants in that year's London edition of the Red Bull Music Academy. Following this, they formed a collaborative project under the moniker of Kidsuke; their debut album as a duo, Kidsuke, was released in 2012.

Tanabe has utilized the software Ableton Live for his live performances, and Logic Pro for writing his compositions. In 2016, he toured India, which included playing a set at Magnetic Fields Festival in Rajasthan. In 2018, he released an extended play (EP) titled Cat Steps through the Mumbai-based record label Knowmad, and went on a tour to promote the EP in September of that year.

== Discography ==
=== Singles ===
- "circle line" (2007)
- "Alice" (2014)
- "cpra" (2016)
- "late night fishing" (2017)

=== EPs ===
- After Few Layers Before (2008)
- Flowers on a Wall (2012)
- achilles (2015)
- Cat Steps (2018)
- ten (2020)

=== Albums ===
- Before I Forget (2010; remastered and re-released in 2022)
- Floating Underwater (2014)

=== Collaborations ===
as Kidsuke (with Kidkanevil)

- Kidsuke (2012)

with Jealousguy

- Zoooriginals #1 (2012)
