= Matthew Yee-King =

- Genres: Electronic; IDM; Drill 'n' bass; Experimental; Improvisation; Algorave
- Occupations: Musician, composer, remixer, DJ
- Instruments: Synthesizer, drums, laptop, SuperCollider
- Labels: Rephlex, ChordPunch, Trash, Bug Klinik

Matthew Yee-King is a British electronic musician, percussionist and researcher based in London, performing music as Yee-King. He is known for bringing an education in science and genetics into music, including his celebrated 2001 Drill 'n' bass release SuperUser released by Rephlex Records, his work with Finn Peters in making music from brainwaves, and his doctoral work on applying Artificial intelligence techniques to automatic synthesizer programming. "Goodnight Toby", a track from SuperUser, was listed in the top 100 greatest IDM tracks by FACT magazine.

Matthew is a professor in the department of computing at Goldsmiths, University of London.
