= Urban Tribe =

American electronic band

Urban Tribe is the alias used by Sherard Ingram, an electronic musician from Detroit.

Urban Tribe's first releases were issued on Carl Craig's labels, Retroactive and Planet E. He signed with Mo Wax and released an EP for the label in 1996. In 1998, Mo Wax issued his debut full-length, The Collapse of Modern Culture, which featured production from Craig, Anthony Shakir, and Moodymann.

Urban Tribe reappeared in 2002 as Mystic Tribe, recording for Clone Records, then began working with Rephlex Records, for whom he issued two full-lengths.

== Discography ==
- Eastward (Mo Wax, 1996)
- The Collapse of Modern Culture (Mo Wax, 1998)
- Authorized Clinical Trials (Rephlex Records, 2006)
- Acceptable Side Effects (Rephlex Records, 2007)
- Urban Tribe (Mahogani Music, 2010)
