= Bodenständig 2000 =

German electronic music group

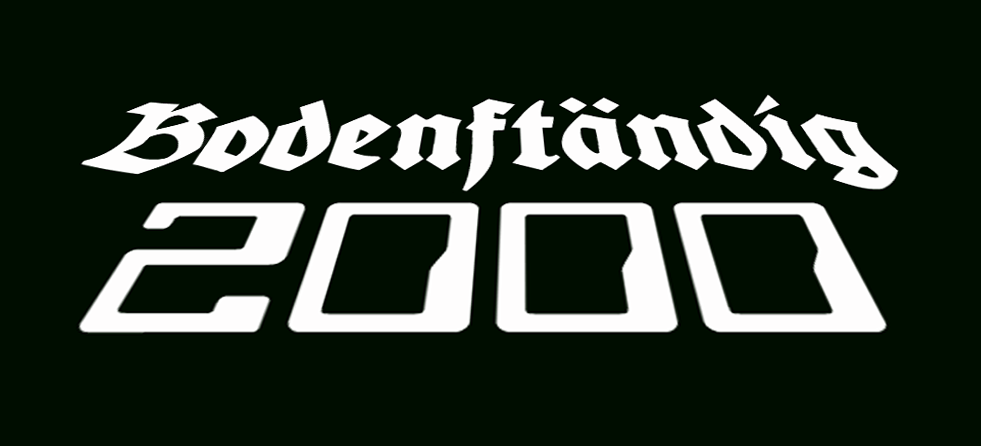
Bodenständig 2000 logo

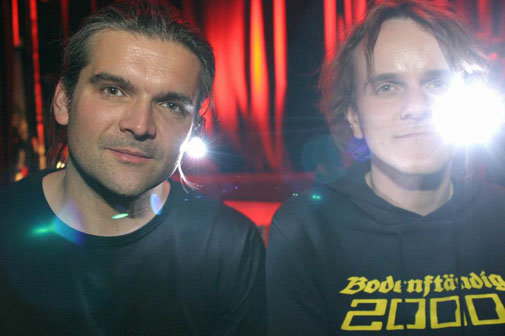
Bodenständig 2000 members, Bernhard Kirsch (left) and Dragan Espenschied (right).

Bodenständig 2000
Formation:	1995
Genre:	Electronica, chiptune, bitpop, eurodance
Website:	http://www.bodenstandig.de/2000/
Founder members / current members
Singer, Home computer:	Bernhard Kirsch
Singer, Home computer, Recorder:	Dragan Espenschied

Bodenständig 2000 is an electronic music group from Germany, founded in 1995 by Dragan Espenschied and Bernhard Kirsch. They are the self-proclaimed pioneers of the home computer folk music movement.

In 1999, they released their debut album "Maxi German Rave Blast Hits 3" on Rephlex Records, London. It contains mixture of chiptunes, rave, eurodance, some "serious electronica" plus German vocals and was completely produced at home with non-professional equipment and selfmade software.

Up until 2002, some minor releases took place, like remixes, compilation tracks or home computer diskettes. In June 2003 the EP "Hart rockende Wissenschaftler" was released on Feed The Machine records, Detroit, containing hardcore chiptune dance tracks on one side and folky harmony singing on the other.

By invitation of the US subsidiary of the German Goethe-Institut, Bodenständig 2000 was able to perform the first concert of the Version>3-Festivals in Chicago in 2003.

The song 'In Rock 8-Bit' is featured in the Annoying Thing animation by TurboForce3d starring Crazy Frog.

The musicians achieved worldwide coverage in July 2006 due to their opting out of the music portal iTunes, which they attributed to fundamental disagreement with the restrictive digital rights management model. Gaining massive momentum in the blogosphere the story finally made its way into the International Herald Tribune. Being accused of trying to pull off a publicity stunt, the band decided to make the tracks in question available for free download.

== Discography ==
- Hemzärmelig (1998) (Translation: 'Short-sleeved' colloquial)
- Maxi German Rave Blast Hits 3 (1999)
- Hart Rockende Wissenschafter (2004) (Translation: 'Hard rocking scientists')
- UBER ALBUM (2008)
