= Innovaders =

- Origin: New York City, US
- Genres: Acid house Electronica; Techno; Intelligent dance music
- Years active: 1996–present
- Labels: Metal Postcard Records; SluntRec

Innovaders are an electronic music group formed in 1996. Their music incorporates acid house and IDM influences.

== Discography ==
- Innovaders: EP (2001)
- Make Some Acid (2003)
- Acid Reign (2006)
