= Black Devil Disco Club =

Electronic disco music project

- Disco Club (1978) cover

Background information
- Origin: Paris, France
- Genres: Disco
- Years active: 1978; 2006–present
- Labels: Rephlex Records; RCA; OUT Records; Lo Recordings
- Members: Bernard Fevre (aka Junior Claristidge)

Black Devil, or Black Devil Disco Club, is an electronic disco music project by Bernard Fevre, a French musician who also released synthesizer compositions on library music albums under his own name and under the alias Milpatte.

== Disco Club ==
The first Black Devil release was the relatively obscure Disco Club six-track EP in 1978. The actual artist name and album title are ambiguous; releases, reviews, and even the official artist and label websites use "Black Devil" and "Black Devil Disco Club" interchangeably.

Songwriting credits on the EP named Junior Claristidge and Joachim Sherylee, aliases for Bernard Fevre and Jacky Giordano, respectively. In a 2007 interview, Fevre explained that Giordano's role was not musical; he just financed the recordings, and the co-writing credit was a way of recouping that investment.

The 1978 EP was reissued in 2004 on the Rephlex label. Collectors unaware of the original LP release initially speculated that the reissue was a hoax by Rephlex founders.

The reissue press release read as follows:

"Originally released on Out Records way back in 1978, Black Devil’s "Disco Club" is an extremely rare disco masterpiece, an epic journey into the deepest electronic disco ... The record was discovered by Rephlex’s own PP Roy for 20 pence at a car boot sale, and quickly found favour with friends Richard D. James and Luke Vibert. The record has received heavy road testing from Richard and Luke, and original copies are on the net for up to £200... Keen as ever to share fantastic music, label co-founder Grant Wilson-Claridge has managed to secure the exclusive license for Rephlex, unwittingly beating Metro Area’s Morgan Geist (a longtime fan) to the snap!.... It was made manually in a recording studio in the suburbs of Paris using synths and occasional tape loops and a drummer: no midi or computers..."

The album is similar to From Here to Eternity by Giorgio Moroder, an electronica album produced one year earlier at Musicland Studios, in Munich, Germany.

== Track listings ==
Disco Club
France: RCA Victor PL 37164
Italy: OUT OUT-ST 25006

Side A
No.	Title	Length
1.	""H" Friend"	5:43
2.	"Timing, Forget the Timing"	4:34
3.	"One to Choose"	4:57

Side B
No.	Title	Length
1.	"We Never Fly Away Again"	4:53
2.	"Follow Me (Instrumental)"	5:15
3.	"No Regrets"	5:00

2004 "Disco Club" reissue

The 2004 reissue had four editions, some of which featured a new "128 bpm" remix by Luke Vibert under his Kerrier District alias:

UK: Rephlex CAT 146 EP

Side A
No.	Title	Length
1.	"Timing, Forget the Timing"	4:34
2.	"One to Choose"	4:57

Side B
No.	Title	Length
1.	"Follow Me (Instrumental)"	5:15
2.	"No Regrets"	5:00

UK: Rephlex CAT 146 R

Side A
No.	Title	Length
1.	"Timing, Forget the Timing (128 bpm)" (Additional production and remix by Kerrier District)	6:45

Side B
No.	Title	Length
1.	"Follow Me (Instrumental)"	5:15
2.	"No Regrets"	5:00

UK: Rephlex CAT 146 T

Side A
No.	Title	Length
1.	"Timing, Forget the Timing"	4:34
2.	"One to Choose"	4:57

Side B
No.	Title	Length
1.	""H" Friend"	5:43

UK: Rephlex CAT 146 CD

No.	Title	Length
1.	"Timing, Forget the Timing" (fades out instead of ending abruptly)	4:34
2.	"Timing, Forget the Timing (128 bpm)" (Additional production and remix by Kerrier District)	6:45
3.	"We Never Fly Away Again" (fades out instead of ending abruptly)	4:53

== New releases ==
After the success of the reissue, Fevre started to produce music again, performing live and relaunching the Black Devil Disco Club project. He released several new albums via the Lo Recordings label: 28 After (2006), Black Devil in Dub (2007; remixes of songs from 28 After), and Eight Oh Eight (2008). Circus, released April 11, 2011, features Nancy Sinatra, Afrika Bambaataa, Faris Badwan the Horrors, YACHT, Jon Spencer (Blues Explosion), Aja Emma (Cosmetics), CocknBullKid, Nancy Fortune, and Nicolas Ker (Poni Hoax).

- 2006 - 28 After
- 2007 - Black Devil in Dub (remixes of songs from 28 After)
- 2008 - Eight Oh Eight
- 2009 - Black Devil Disco Club Presents: The Strange New World of Bernard Fevre
- 2011 - Circus (features Nancy Sinatra, Afrika Bambaataa, Faris Badwan the Horrors, YACHT, Jon Spencer (Blues Explosion), Aja Emma (Cosmetics), CocknBullKid, Nancy Fortune, and Nicolas Ker (Poni Hoax))
- 2013 - Black Moon White Sun
- 2020 - Lucifer is a Flower

A single from Circus, "My Screen", featuring Nicolas Ker, was released on 11 October 2010.

== Appearances ==
The dub version of the song "The Devil In Us" was featured in Grand Theft Auto IV on the fictional radio station Electro-Choc.

"'H' Friend" (Free Disco Permanent Midnight remix) was featured on the third episode of the first season of the 2021 series Chucky.
