= The Mike Flowers Pops =

British band

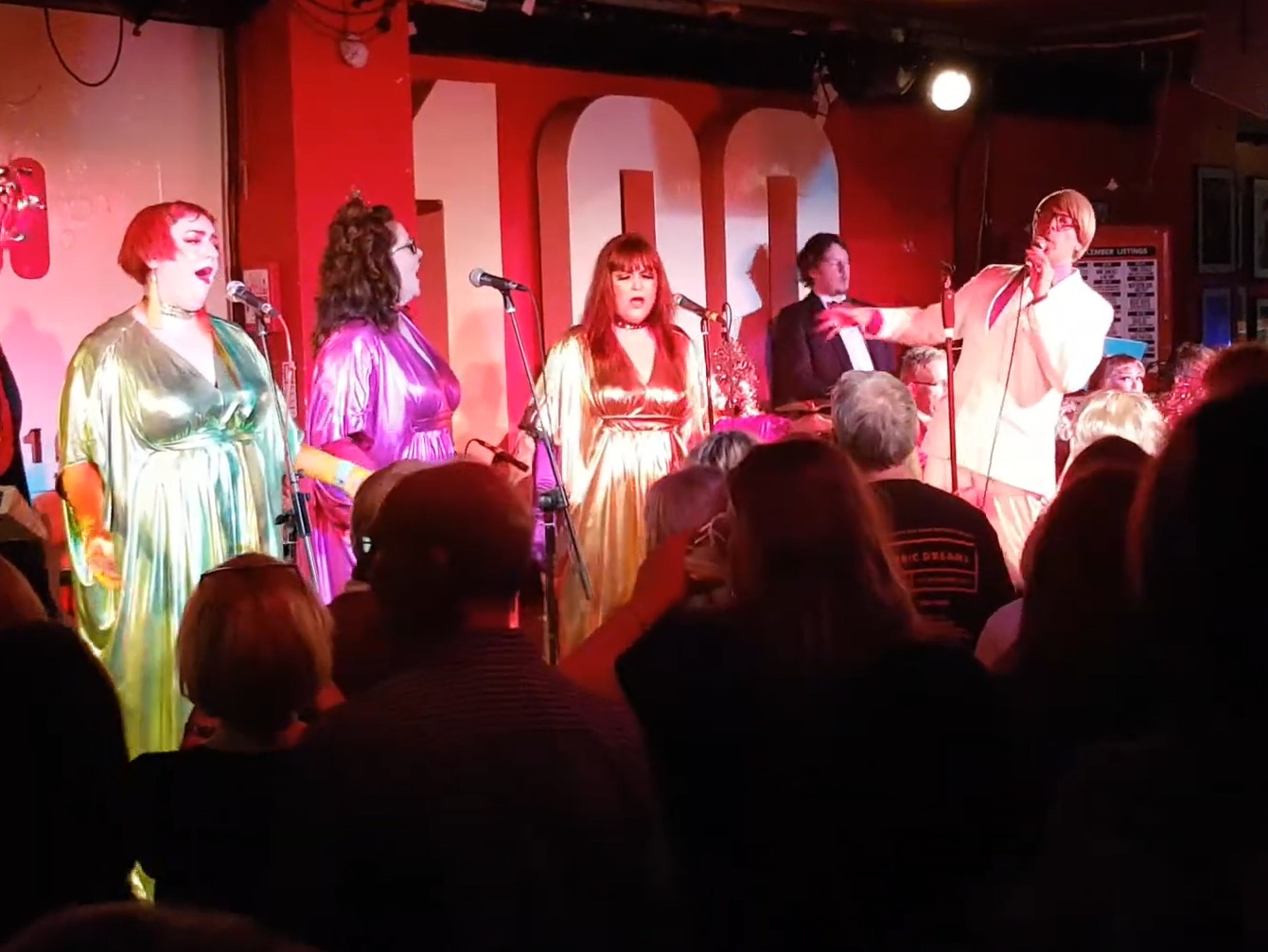
- The Mike Flowers Pops performing at the 100 Club in 2017

Background information
- Origin: London, England
- Genres: Pop, easy listening
- Years active: 1993—present
- Label: Sony Music
- Members: Mike Flowers

The Mike Flowers Pops (also known as MFP, The Pops or The Mike Flowers Pops Orchestra) are a British easy listening band fronted by founder Mike Flowers (real name Michael Roberts), the only constant member of the band.

== History ==
Formed in 1993, the Mike Flowers Pops can have up to fourteen members on stage at any time, and they are principally known for easy listening or lounge music covers of both 'classic' and contemporary pop music.

The band became famous in the United Kingdom in 1995 when they released a cover version of Oasis' hit song "Wonderwall", in an easy listening style. After seeing the band perform, BBC radio producer Will Saunders had recruited Flowers for BBC Radio 1 DJ Kevin Greening in order to cover the 'Hits of 95' for Greening's Saturday show; "Wonderwall" was his first week's project. Chris Evans heard the song and made it 'single of the week' on his Radio 1 breakfast show, telling listeners that this was the original version of the song. The single, issued by London Records under the name The Mike Flowers Pops, was released while the Oasis original was still in the UK Singles Chart, and itself reached the Top 10. Flowers' version peaked at number 2 in the UK Christmas 1995 chart and got to number one in Scotland. Lou Reed, when asked at the time whether he had heard anything by Oasis, claimed: "Not that I would know. Oh, Wonderwall? The one I know is the Mike Flowers one. That is one of the funniest things I've ever heard in my life."

Following the success of "Wonderwall", The Mike Flowers Pops quickly advanced from performing shows in nightclubs and small concert halls to touring festivals and larger venues across Britain and Europe. A Groovy Place was released on 24 June 1996. At the end of 1996 they toured Britain with Gary Glitter on his last 'Who's in the Gang' tour. They played large venues including Wembley Arena and Birmingham NEC. Cover versions of The Doors' "Light My Fire" and "Don't Cry for Me Argentina" also reached the top 40 of the UK chart.

The band’s 1996 EP "The Freebase Connection" released by Lo Recordings included remixes by electronica and IDM artists including Funki Porcini, Luke Vibert and Aphex Twin. Aphex Twin’s remix "Debase (Soft Palate)" was included on his 2003 compilation album "26 Mixes For Cash".

The Mike Flowers Pops played at the Shiiine On Weekender in November 2016 and at the 100 Club in London in December 2016 and December 2017.

== Mike Flowers ==
Mike Flowers
- Also known as: Mike Flowers
- Born: Michael Roberts; 1960 (age 65–66); Liverpool, England
- Origin: London, England
- Genres: Pop
- Occupation: Singer
- Instruments: Vocals, guitar
- Member of: Mike Flowers Pops

Michael Roberts performs as bandleader Mike Flowers. He has since scored music for film and television, and made music documentaries for Sky Arts and London’s Barbican Centre. How Art Made Pop is his first book and supported by the "Sounds Superb Singers" and "Super Stereo Brass".

He lives in London, is married and has two children. He studied Painting at Chelsea School of Art (1978-1981) and completed an MA in Music at Goldsmiths, University of London (2012-2014).

== Discography ==
=== Albums ===
List of albums, with selected chart positions
Title	Album details	Peak chart positions
Title	Album details	AUS
A Groovy Place	Released: June 1996; Format: CD, cassette; Label: London Records (828 743.2)	. 138

=== Extended plays ===
List of EPs, with selected details
Title	Details
The Freebase Connection	Released: 1996; Format: CD, 12" LP; Label: Lo Recordings (LOEP 02)
Hold the Corner (with Cornershop)	Released: 2016; Format: digital; Label: Ample Play

=== Singles ===
List of singles, with selected chart positions
Title	Year	Chart positions		Album
Title	Year	UK	AUS	Album
"Wonderwall"	1995	2	48	A Groovy Place
"Light My Fire" / "Please Release Me"	1996	39	158	A Groovy Place
"Don't Cry for Me Argentina"	1996	30	—	non album singles
"Talk"	2005	—	—	non album singles
