= Analogue Bubblebath 5 =

EP by AFX
- Released: 2005
- Recorded: 1995
- Genre: IDM
- Length: 44:58
- Label: Rephlex CAT 034
- Producer: Richard D. James

AFX chronology
Analogue Bubblebath 4 (1994)	Analogue Bubblebath 5 (2005)	Hangable Auto Bulb (1995)

Analogue Bubblebath 5 is an unreleased EP by the British electronic music artist and producer Richard D. James, under the alias of AFX. Recorded in 1995 and consisting of nine tracks, the EP had been intended for release on James' own label, Rephlex Records, as the fifth installment in his Analogue Bubblebath series. However, James decided that it was not up to par with other entries in the series, so it never made it past the test pressing stage. Only 20 copies of the record were produced.

== Release ==
In January 2005, Rephlex started to mail out the binder and black vinyl editions of Analord 10. Due to issues at the manufacturing and mail out stage, approximately 20 buyers did not receive their package. Rephlex mailed out a second batch in June 2005 to those who had not received their order. This second batch included a free copy of Analogue Bubblebath 5.

No information is printed on the record's blank white labels, however some copies do have "AB5" written and circled onto them. The matrix number 'CAT 034' was etched into the record's run-out grooves. As of November 2026, the EP was never released, however some of the tracks from the album were released elsewhere. Track 9, "Cuckoo", was released on the previous volume, Analogue Bubblebath 4.

== Track listing ==
All tracks are written by Richard D. James.

No.	Title	Length
1.	Untitled	9:08
2.	Untitled	5:57
3.	Untitled	0:31
4.	Untitled	4:21
5.	Untitled	6:36
6.	Untitled	6:15
7.	Untitled	4:50
8.	Untitled	6:51
9.	"Cuckoo (Note: while technically untitled, the title "Cuckoo" was given to the track by both the Rephlex Records website and its release on Analogue Bubblebath 4.)"	6:04
Total length:		44:58

== Personnel ==
- Richard D. James – producer
