= Robert Normandeau =

Canadian electroacoustic music composer (born 1955)

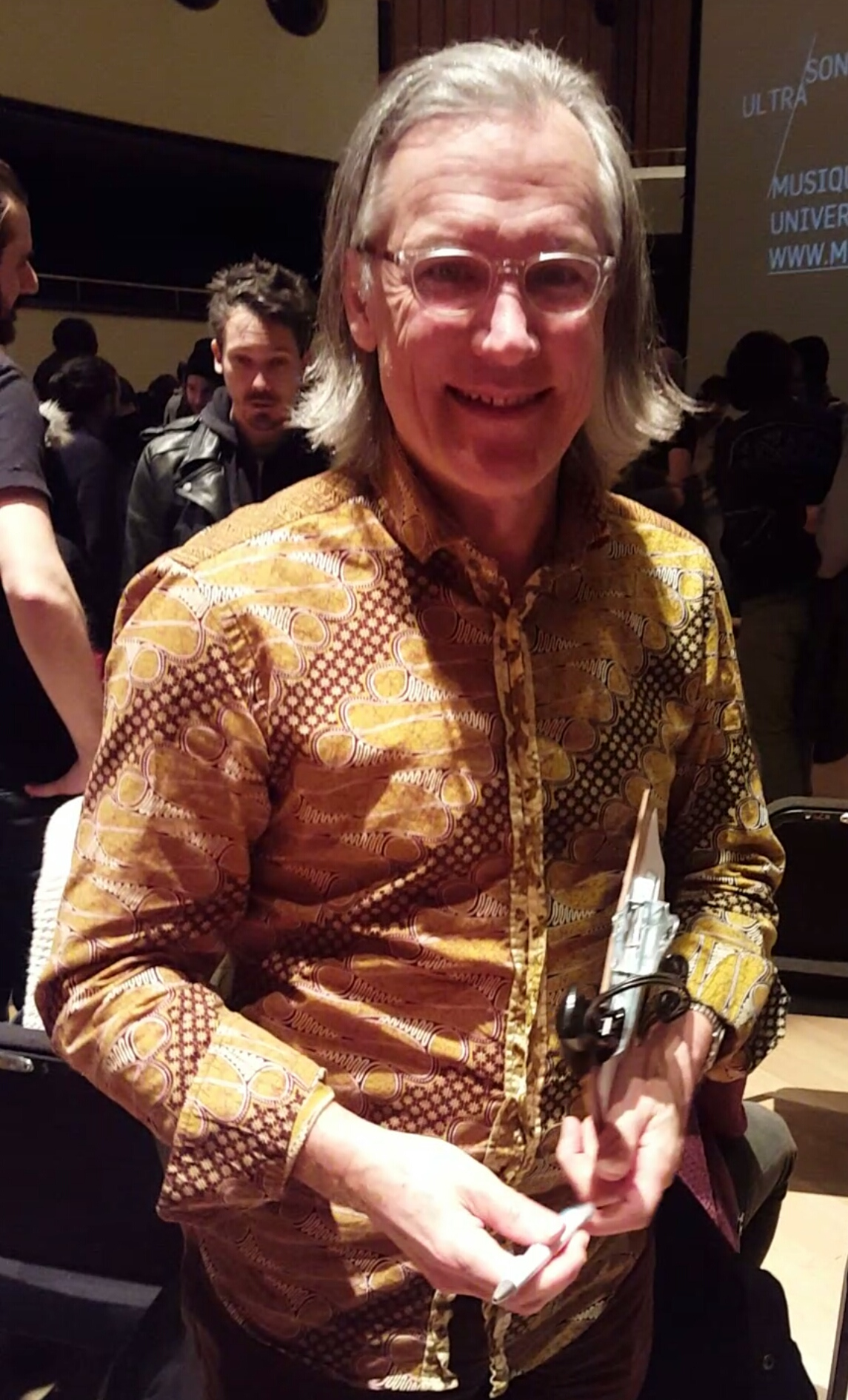

Robert Normandeau (born March 11, 1955) is a Canadian electroacoustic music composer.

Born in Quebec City, Quebec, Normandeau studied at the Université Laval in Quebec City, and at the Université de Montréal, where he studied with Marcelle Deschênes and Francis Dhomont. He currently resides in Montreal, where he was appointed Professor of Electroacoustic Music Composition in 1999. With the release of Puzzles (empreintes DIGITALes, IMED 0575, 2005) he was the first on the label to embrace the short-lived high-quality if impractical DVD Audio format.

== Recordings ==
- Puzzles (empreintes DIGITALes, IMED 0575, 2005)
- Clair de terre (empreintes DIGITALes, IMED 0157, 2001)
- Sonars (Rephlex, CAT 116, 2001)
- Figures (empreintes DIGITALes, IMED 9944, 1999)
- Tangram (empreintes DIGITALes, IMED 9920, 1999)
- Lieux inouïs (empreintes DIGITALes, IMED 9802, 1998)
- Le petit prince d'Antoine de Saint-Exupéry (Radio-Canada, MVCD 1091, 1996)
- Tangram (empreintes DIGITALes, IMED 9419/20, 1994)
- Lieux inouïs (empreintes DIGITALes, IMED 9002, 1990)
- Normandeau, Spangiafora et al. Sonic Circuits 5 (Innova 114)

== List of works ==
- Bédé (1990)
- Le cap de la tourmente (1984–1985)
- La chambre blanche (1985–1986)
- Chat noir (1995)
- Chorus (2002), 16-track tape
- Clair de terre (1999)
- Convergence Radio (1989)
- Éclats de voix (1991)
- Éden (2003), 16-track tape
- Électre suite (2000)
- Ellipse (1999)
- L'envers du temps (1998, 2000), guitar, and tape
- Erinyes (2001)
- Erinyes pour Lucie (2005), interactive system; choreography by Lucie Grégoire
- Figures de rhétorique (1997), tape, and piano
- The Flautist (2001)
- Fragments (1992)
- Hamlet-Machine with Actors (2003), 16-track tape
- Jeu (1989)
- Jeu blanc (2001), tape, and flute
- Kuppel (2006)
- Malina (2000)
- Matériau pour Médée (2005)
- Matrechka (1986)
- Mémoires vives (1989)
- Musique holographique (1984–1985)
- Palimpseste (2005, 06)
- Palindrome (2005–2006)
- Le petit prince (1994)
- Puzzle (2003), 16-track tape
- Le renard et la rose (1995)
- Rumeurs (Place de Ransbeck) (1987)
- Spleen (1993)
- StrinGDberg (2001–2003), 16-track tape
- Tangram (1992)
- Tropes (1991)
- Venture (1998)
