= Mike Dred =

- Also known as: The Kosmik Kommando; Chimera
- Born: Michael Cullen; 1967 (age 58–59); Lowestoft, England
- Origin: Suffolk, England
- Genre: Acid techno
- Occupations: DJ, producer, sound engineer
- Instrument: Roland TB-303
- Years active: 1983–present
- Labels: Machine Codes; Rephlex Records; R&S Records

Michael Cullen (born 1967 near Lowestoft, England), aka Mike Dred, is a British experimental techno DJ, producer, and sound engineer, best known for his work in acid techno, and his use of the Roland TB-303.

He is also known as the Kosmik Kommando, Chimera, and Judge Dred. He released his first record through Rephlex Records, and his third release, Kosmik Kommando EP, was given the catalogue number CAT007 because of his interest in James Bond. He also was a member of the Universal Indicator group, who released several techno recordings under Rephlex

Mike Dred established the Machine Codes record label in 1990, and also recorded for R&S Records and R&S Records offshoot Diatomyc from 1992 to 1997. From 1994 to 1999, he collaborated extensively with electro-acoustic artist Peter Green and also produced a one-off collaboration with techno producer Dr. Fernando. In 2012, he recorded the Overmind LP for De:Tuned in Antwerp and has contributed to both De:Tuned Box Set compilations.

== Discography ==
=== As Kosmik Kommando ===
- Kosmik Kommando ep (Rephlex Records, CAT007) EP (vinyl) 1992
- Freaquenseize (Rephlex Records, CAT010) 2XLP, 2XCD 1993
- Universal Indicator Yellow (1993)
- Universal Indicator 5 (Ultra-Violet) 1992 / 2000
- Analogue Android (2011)

=== As Mike Dred ===
- Rock The People EP (Machine Codes) 1990
- Fu Chin Ra EP (Machine Codes, CODE A) 1993
- Kosmik KonundrumsEP (Machine Codes, CODE B) 1994
- CODE C EP. (Machine Codes, CODE C) 1994
- Beyond The Box EP (with Peter Green) (Machine Codes CODE D) 1995
- EPNOM BYMON EP (with Peter Green) (Machine Codes CODE E) 1996
- DJ Mike Dred - 98K Live (Rephlex Records, CAT069) EP (vinyl)
- Mike Dred & Peter Green - Virtual Farmer (Rephlex Records, CAT070)

=== As Universal Indicator ===
- Blue (1992)
- Innovation in the Dynamics of Acid (2001)

=== As Chimera ===
- Untitled 4 Track White Label (Rephlex Records, 1993)
- Valley of the Spirits / The Future is Upon US (Rephlex Records) 1993
- Valley of the Spirits (Rephlex Records, CAT012)CDLP 1993
- Out of the Valley EP (Machine Codes. CHIME 2T. 1996)
- Shen Circuits (Veil of the Spirits) EP. (Machine Codes, CODE 1110) Digital Release 2016
- Cabeus EP. (Machine Codes CODE 1111) Digital Release 2017
- Fireside Phoenix EP. (Machine Codes CODE x10) Digital Release 2017
