= Cylob =

British electronic musician and producer

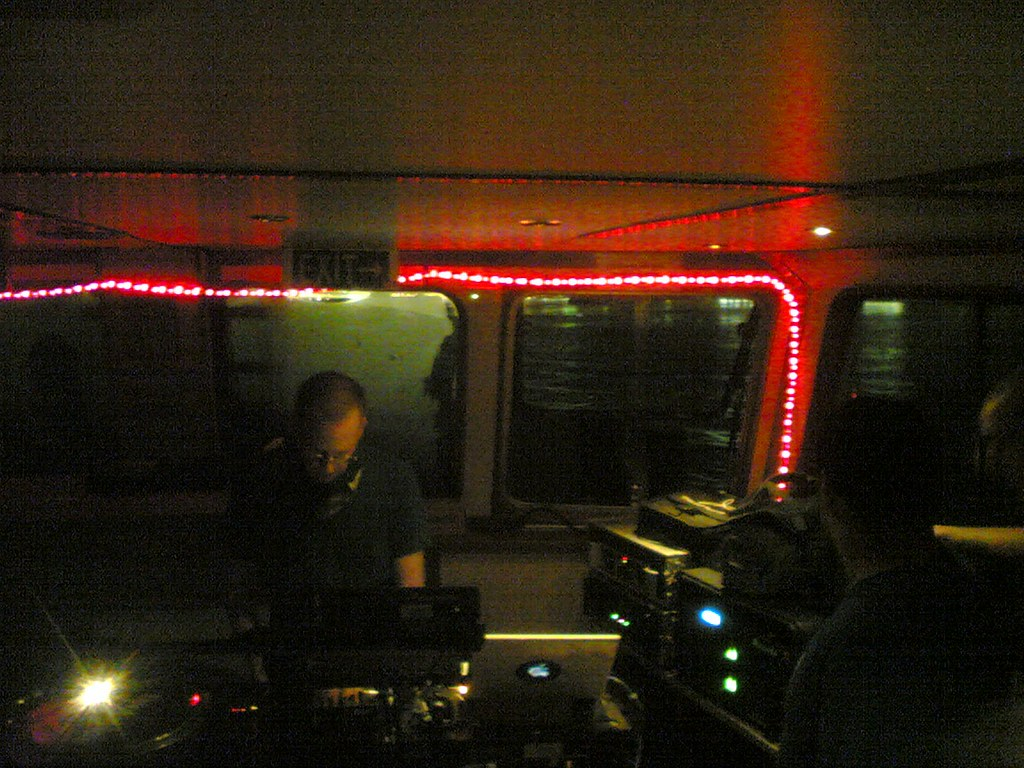
- Cylob performing in 2008

Background information
- Born: Chris Jeffs
- Genre: Intelligent dance music, electronic music
- Years active: 1993–present
- Labels: Rephlex Records, Cylob Industries

Chris Jeffs, known by the stage name Cylob, is a British electronic musician and producer. He has produced fifteen albums, three compilations and a number of remixes. Previously signed to Rephlex Records, Jeffs started his own digital label Cylob Industries in 2007.

== Career ==
His career evolved after he gave a demo tape to Aphex Twin at a gig in early 1993, who subsequently signed Jeffs to his Rephlex label. For a while the two were working and living in the same building. Since his debut, he has released 13 singles and 5 albums on Rephlex, in addition to the EP Spider Report for Breakin' Records. Then followed the harsh dancefloor sonics of Cylob's Latest Effort and Lobster Tracks (with its Chris Cunningham-illustrated sleeve), pop pastiche with "Living In The 1980s", meditative bells and gongs on Mood Bells and the electronic funk and braindance of Cylob Music System Volumes 1 & 2. Although Cylob's music is predominantly instrumental, using a drum machine patch with sequencers, that evolved into digital compositions which included "midi style sequencing". In 2007 he launched his own label, Cylob Industries, to release his material, while licensing it to various labels for hard-copy prints on CD and vinyl. In 2014, the compilation Cymply The Best 93-01 was released, while much of the Rephlex material was re-released.

== Discography ==
=== Albums ===
- Empathy Box as Kinesthesia, later re-released as Cylob (Rephlex, 1996)
- Loops and Breaks (Rephlex, 1996)
- Cylobian Sunset (Rephlex, 1996)
- Previously Unavailable on Compact Disc (Rephlex, 1998)
- Mood Bells (Rephlex, 2001)
- Trojan Fader Style (Cylob Industries, 2007)
- Formant Potaton (Cylob Industries, 2007)
- Ambient News as Ambient News (Cylob Industries, 2009)
- Bounds Green (Cylob Industries, 2007)
- Catastrophic as nonprivate (Alku, 2010)
- Zweite Sendung as Ambient News (Cylob Industries, 2011)
- The Quantum Loonyverse (mp3/flac only) (Cylob Industries, 2015)
- 54 Minute Mirage (Cylob Industries, 2020)
- One Less Pitch (Cylob Industries, 2020)
- Live 060708 (Cylob Industries, 2020)
- PLACEHOLDER (Cylob Industries, 2021)
- I Will Cross Any Bridge (Cylob Industries, 2023)
- In Dystopia (Cylob Industries, 2026)
- Cylobian Summer (Cylob Industries, 2026)

=== Singles and EPs ===
- Kinesthesia Volume 1 as Kinesthesia (Rephlex, 1993)
- Kinesthesia Volume 2 as Kinesthesia (Rephlex, 1995)
- Industrial Folk Songs (Rephlex, 1995)
- Empathy Box Remixes as Kinesthesia (Rephlex, 1996)
- Cylob's Latest Effort (Rephlex, 1997)
- Diof 97 (Rephlex, 1997)
- Are We Not Men Who Live and Die (Rephlex, 1998)
- Rewind! (Rephlex, 192/99)
- Lobster Tracks (Rephlex, 197/99)
- Living in the 1980s / Sex Machine (Rephlex, 1999)
- Cut The Midrange, Drop The Bass (Rephlex, 2001)
- Cylobotnia (with Astrobotnia) (Rephlex, 2003)
- Cylob Music System Volume 1 (Rephlex, 2004)
- Cylob Music System Volume 2 (Rephlex, 2004)
- Spider Report E.P. (Breakin' Records, 2004)
- Private Life (With DMX Krew as Private Lives) (SoulJazz Records, 2007)
- Rock The Trojan Fader (Cylob Industries, 2007)
- Late In The Day (Cylob Industries, 2008)
- Alpine Acid (mp3 only) (Cylob Industries, 2008)
- Pepper Spray (Cylob Industries, 2010)
- Inflatable Hope (Power Vacuum, 2015)
- Tomorrow Foolish Logic (Cylob Industries, 2021)
- A Quiet Life (Cylob Industries, 2026)
- Show Us Another World Is Possible (Cylob Industries, 2026)

=== Remixes ===
- Bochum Welt, Scharlach Eingang (Rephlex, 1994) – "Phlughaven Alphard (Kinesthesia Mix)"
- Aphex Twin, Ventolin (Warp, 1995) – "Ventolin (Cylob mix)"
- Immersion, Remixes Volume 3 (Swim, 1995) – "Envelope (Cylob remix)"
- DMX Krew, Nu Romantix (Rephlex, 1998) – "I'm All Alone (Cylob's mix)"
- The Jones Machine, "You're The One (Part Two)" b/w "(I'm The) Disco Dancing" (Rephlex, 1999) – "You're The One (Part Two) Cylob's mix"; "(I'm The) Disco Dancing (Cylob's mix)"
- Soulwax, Saturday (Hotline mix) (Play It Again Sam, 1999)
- The Mike Flowers Pops (Lo Recordings, 1999)
- Christian Vogel, "Whipaspank (Cylob mix)" (Novamute, 2000)
- "Synclair (Cylob Mix)" (Areal Records, 2007)
