= Universal Indicator (collective) =

British techno duo

- Genres: Acid techno
- Years active: 1992–1995, 2001
- Labels: Rephlex Records
- Past members: Mike Dred; Richard D. James

Universal Indicator is the group name for Rephlex Records artists Richard D. James (as Martin Tressider) and Mike Dred (a.k.a. The Kosmik Kommando). The name is a reference to the signature acid techno sound found on all the releases. Five projects were released, and a compilation CD was mixed by Dred.

All the albums are named after different colours used on the UI spectrum. Their catalog numbers reference Roland synthesizers: the TB-303, the TR-606, the MC-202, and the SH-101. They were released in the following order: Blue, Red, Yellow, and Green. Blue and Yellow were produced by Dred, while Red and Green are often attributed to James, though never officially. A fifth, released directly under Mike Dred's alias, expands the colour spectrum theme beyond the visible spectrum into Ultra-Violet.

== Discography ==
Release Information
Blue
- Released: 1992
- Format: 12" vinyl
- Label: Rephlex Records
- Catalogue Number: TB-303
Red
- Released: 1992
- Format: 12" vinyl
- Label: Rephlex Records
- Catalogue Number: TR-606
Yellow
- Released: 1993
- Format: 12" vinyl
- Label: Rephlex Records
- Catalogue Number: MC-202
- Officially by The Kosmik Kommando
Green
- Released: 1995
- Format: 12", 10", 7" vinyl
- Label: Rephlex Records
- Catalogue Number: SH-101
Green promo
- Released: 1995
- Format: 7" vinyl
- Label: Rephlex Records
- Catalogue Number: SH-101
Innovation in the Dynamics of Acid
- Released: 2001
- Format: CD
- Label: Rephlex Records
- Catalogue Number: CAT 117 CD
- This is a DJ mix CD by Mike Dred of the material from the original releases. The music is credited to "various artists" and Richard D. James is thanked under the alias Martin Tressider.
Universal Indicator 5 (Ultra-Violet)
- Released: 2001
- Format: 12" vinyl
- Label: Beta Bodega
- Catalogue Number: BB03.5
- Officially by The Kosmik Kommando
