= Vulva (band) =

Vulva is the English experimental techno duo of Tim Hutton and the German-born Thomas Melchior.

Hutton and Melchior formed Vulva in 1993, and were signed by Aphex Twin's Rephlex Records. Their first release was From the Cockpit in 1993. The Mini Space Vulvette EP was released in 1994 by the US label Reflective Records. They also recorded as Yoni for German label Source. Their second album, Birdwatch, was released by Rephlex in 1995, and they followed it with Vulvic Yonification in 1997.

Melchior went on to release records under a variety of pseudonyms. Hutton, who had previously released a solo album (Conscious Kind, released in 1991 by Some Bizzare), recorded another, Everything, released in 2000 by Play It Again Sam.

== Discography ==
- From the Cockpit (1993), Rephlex
- Mini Space Vulvette EP (1994), Reflective
- Birdwatch (1995), Rephlex
- My Little Yoni (1996), Source -as Yoni
- "Doggy Bag" single (1996), Soft Core
- Vulvic Yonification (1997), EFA
