= D'Arcangelo =

Italian musical group; electronica duo

D'Arcangelo is an Italian electronic music group formed by twin brothers Fabrizio and Marco D'Arcangelo. The duo have also performed as Centuria City, Automia Division, and Monomorph. Their music has been described as intelligent dance music, neo-electro, minimal techno, electro, and experimental.

The D'Arcangelo twins are from Rome, where they were involved with the rave scene in the early 1990s, where they began working with DJ Max Durante. The brothers' first project, between 1992 and 1994, was Automatic Sound Unlimited, with Durante. After moving to England, a conversation with a record shop owner led to D'Arcangelo being noticed by Rephlex Records and Richard D. James, who eventually signed them and published multiple of their records. Their first release as D'Arcangelo was a self-titled EP on Rephlex.

Allmusic calls Shipwreck (1999) "one of the finest releases from the Rephlex label" and Broken Toys' Corner (2002) "superb". Hybrid Magazine called Broken Toys' Corner "a good album but yet exactly what you'd expect from Rephlex". A review for Igloo described Eksel (2007) as having a "rounded and reflected tone, electronic music produced with past electro knowledge whilst looking forward", while Gridface gave it a 2-star review, calling it "dated".

== Discography ==
- D'Arcangelo (EP) - 1996, Rephlex
- Diagrams 10-14 (EP) - 1998, Nature
- Shipwreck - 1999, EFA
- Diagram 9/Feeling No. 4 (EP) - 1999, Suction
- Blind Retina (EP) - 2000, Engine
- Corner (EP) - 2002, White Leather
- Broken Toys' Corner - 2002, Rephlex
- Pro - 2006, Rephlex
- Eksel - 2007, Rephlex
- Pro 188 (EP) - 2009, Rephlex
- Cradle And Go! (EP) - 2010, 030303
- Audiovisual Designs - 2013, Rephlex
- Periscope (EP) - 2015, Analogical Force
- D'Arcangelo (EP) - 2018, Happy Skull
- II (EP) - 2018, Suction
- Dusted (EP) - 2018, Further Electronix
- Tweaking Paper (EP) - 2020, Analogical Force
- Arium (EP) - 2022, A Colourful Storm
- Electric Road (EP) - 2024, WéMè
