= The Gentle People =

Los Angeles-based band

Background information
- Origin: Los Angeles, U.S.
- Genres: Lounge; easy listening; exotica; chillout
- Years active: 1992–2011
- Label: Rephlex
- Past members: Dougie Dimensional; Laurie LeMans; Valentine Carnelian; Honeymink

The Gentle People were a band formed in the United States in 1995. Their sound explored "kitschy" 1950s lounge and easy listening aesthetics in the context of 1990s club culture. They signed to the UK electronic label Rephlex Records in 1995 and released two albums: Soundtracks for Living (1997) and Simply Faboo (1999).

== Career ==
The four members of the Gentle People variously came from the US, UK, and France, and performed under the names Dougee Dimensional, Laurie LeMans, Valentine Carnelian, and Honeymink. The group describe themselves as an "audio-visual experience" and labeled their sound "E-Z-Core." They were signed to Rephlex Records (co-run by Richard D. James a/k/a Aphex Twin), despite the group's "relaxed brand of sugar-coated, vocal-based easy listening" being quite different from the output on that electronic label. The signing occurred after they mailed a demo and postcard. The 1995 track "Journey" was their first release. They followed up with an EP surrounding the song "Emotion Heater" in 1996.

The group released their 1997 debut album Soundtracks for Living on the label. The album mixed typical lounge sounds, including strings, harps, and Latin rhythms, with modern dub, pop, and ambient techno influences. It received a positive review from Select, which claimed that "just when you thought easy listening was played out in a welter of zany student discos, the elegantly multinational Gentle People come to reaffirm la dolce vita." The group has worked with artists such as Pizzicato Five, Fantastic Plastic Machine, and Deee-Lite. They attracted an international following in the UK, Japan, and US, where they appeared on various lounge and exotica compilations. Their work was also remixed by labelmates such as Aphex Twin and Luke Vibert.

Producer Valentine Carnelian died in August 2021.

== Discography ==
=== Studio albums ===
- Soundtracks for Living (1997, Rephlex)
- Simply Faboo (1999, Rephlex)
