= Global Goon =

- Born: November 28, 1967 (age 58)
- Origin: Merseyside, England
- Genres: Electronic music
- Years active: 1989–present
- Labels: Rephlex, Audio Dregs

Global Goon is a former British programmer from Lydiate, England who earned a recording contract with Rephlex Records.

Global Goon has also been rumored to have released five acid records under the alias Syntheme on both Planet Mu and WéMè between 2007 and 2009, but this remains unconfirmed and Syntheme is also known as Louise Helena Wood, from Brighton, England.

Music critics have characterized Global Goon's style as ambient music and "easy listening fusion". From Bessemer Cocktail and after, his music took a turn towards acid house rather than the easy listening downtempo.

== Discography ==
Albums

Title	Release	Label
Goon	1996	Rephlex
Cradle of History	1998	Rephlex
Vatican Nitez	2002	Rephlex
Family Glue	2004	Audio Dregs, J-HOK
Junior Glue	2004	J-HOK
Bessemer Cocktail	2005	WéMè
Pure Rock	2005	J-HOK
Saint Aime	2008	WéMè
Earwhig	2010	Myuzyk
Quones	2011	J-HOK
Everything Is Connected	2011	J-HOK
Carbon	2011	UpItUp
Journeys	2012	J-HOK
Horizon	2012	J-HOK
Plastic Orchestra	2012	030303
-Quonk	2012	J-HOK
-K-Wal	2013	J-HOK
Destroy The Mirror	2014	Balkan Vinyl
Sweet Box	2015	J-HOK

EPs and Singles

Title	Release	Label
Afterlife	1997	Rephlex
Chimay	2008	WéMè
Quonesha	2011	J-HOK
Rivers (EP)	2015	J-HOK
Shazbot (EP)	2015	J-HOK
Great Heck (EP)	2015	J-HOK
NUSH! (EP)	2015	J-HOK

== See also ==
- List of ambient music artists
