= Bochum Welt =

Italian electronic musician

Bochum Welt is the project of composer and producer Gianluigi Di Costanzo. The name Bochum Welt is a combination of the German word for "world" (welt) and the name of a high-powered astral telescope. His first single, Scharlach Eingang (1994), was released on Aphex Twin's Rephlex label and attracted the attention of the British music magazine NME, which ran an article claiming that Bochum Welt could be a ghost project by Aphex Twin. Over the following years, Aphex Twin released eight Bochum Welt records on Rephlex and included his tracks in the label's two compilations.

== Releases and Collaborations ==
His debut album for Sony Music Japan, Module 2 / Desktop Robotics collected early works and was followed by the double CD Robotic Operating Buddy, released by Rephlex and nominated in 2009 as a top 15 electronica album by The Wire. BMG signed him to a long-term worldwide publishing deal in 2009.

Rephlex Records released his new full length album Good Programs (To Be Coloured in Yellow), in 2013, as well as a collaborative EP with Heinrich Muller, AKA Gerald Donald, from the Detroit group Drexciya, which was nominated in 2013 by Fact (UK magazine) in the 50 greatest 10″ records of FACT’s lifetime.

April, a 17-track studio album, is one of the official Record Store Day releases in April 2017, released by Studio K7 and published by BMG.

After a Bochum Welt show on Halloween on the roof of the Ace Hotel Los Angeles, formerly the United Artists Theatre, he met Joshua Eustis, a member of Telefon Tel Aviv / Nine Inch Nails, and the two began collaborating. More live performances followed at the Ace Hotel locations in New York, Chicago, Palm Springs, and London.

In 2019 and 2020 Seafire, an album and remixes released by CPU Records/BMG, included collaborations with Joshua Eustis and EOD.

CPU Records, with publishing by BMG (BMG Rights Management) released F.O.A.S / Desktop Robotics in 2022. In 2024, BMG Records issued a colored-vinyl edition and digital release of the Bochum Welt album Module 2.

Alongside his solo projects, Di Costanzo worked with Thomas Dolby's Headspace, a Los Angeles interactive media company and collective. There, Di Costanzo helped shape sound design, music architecture, and multimedia environments. The company later evolved into Beatnik Inc., with which he continued to collaborate. Di Costanzo also appeared as an opening act for Dolby at selected performances, including Mighty (San Francisco, March 2006) and Kings Place (London, May 2013). Headspace and Beatnik Inc. produced multimedia content for Steven Spielberg, David Bowie, among others.

In 2025, Bochum Welt teamed up with Jil Sander on Wanderlust, a multidisciplinary project that included a vinyl EP, a digital album, a music video, and a live event held at OHG Hamburg, a former factory turned cultural venue. Presented as Jil Sander × Bochum Welt, the collaboration received international coverage in Vogue, Wallpaper, Hypebeast, Icon, and others. The EP and album are published by BMG and distributed worldwide. In September 2025, Bochum Welt composed and performed the original soundtrack for Jil Sander's fashion show in Milan.

Mixes (2026) is a collection of recordings by Bochum Welt. The album includes two collaborative tracks with Tom Rogerson, best known for his album with Brian Eno, Finding Shore, as well as a collaborative track with Ben Morsberger (guitar and keyboard player for Blood Orange; music for Gia Coppola and Spike Jonze). The tracks featured on Mixes include versions and mixes of material developed during the Jil Sander × Bochum Welt project, alongside compositions created for the Jil Sander runway show and additional recordings made in the Engadin valley and in England. The cover artwork features a painting by Peter Robert Berry II (1864–1942), courtesy of the Berry Museum, St. Moritz.

== Discography ==
=== Main albums and EPs ===
- Scharlach Eingang (1994, Rephlex)
- Module 2 (1996, Rephlex / Sony Japan)
- Desktop Robotics (1997, Rephlex / Sony Japan)
- Feelings on a Screen (1997, Rephlex)
- Like a Tim Remixes (1997, Rephlex)
- HEADSPACE music library V10 (1999, Headspace)
- Robotic Operating Buddy EP (2007, Rephlex)
- R.O.B. Album (2008, Rephlex)
- Good Programs (To Be Coloured in Yellow) (2013, Rephlex / BMG)
- April (2017, !K7 / BMG)
- Seafire (2019, CPU / BMG)
- Seafire Remixes (2020, CPU / BMG)
- F.O.A.S. / Desktop Robotics (Special Edition, 2022, CPU / BMG)
- Module 2 (Special Edition, 2024, BMG)
- Wanderlust (2025, Jil Sander × Bochum Welt, BMG)
- Mixes (2026, BMG)

=== Compilation appearances ===
- The Braindance Coincidence (Rephlex, 2001)
- Rephlexions! (Rephlex, 2003)
