= DMX Krew =

Electronic musician

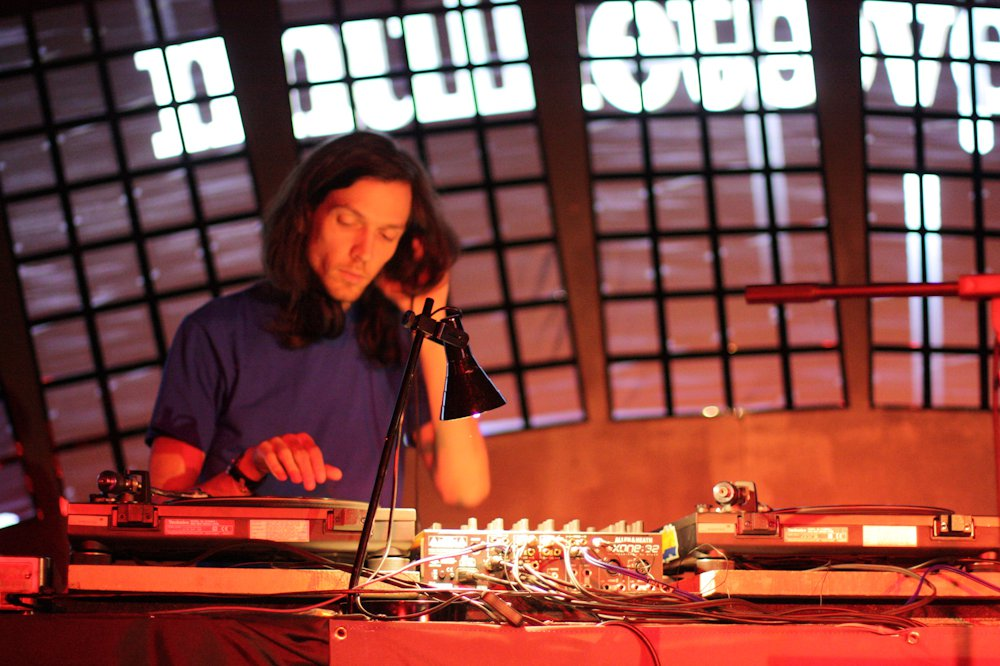
- DMX performing at ShareConference (2012)

Background information
- Born: Edward Arthur David Upton; 1972 (age 53–54)
- Genres: Electro, IDM, acid techno, synthpop
- Labels: Rephlex; Breakin'; WéMè

DMX Krew is the stage name of musician Edward Arthur David Upton. Upton's other aliases include 101 Force, Asylum Seekers, Bass Potato, Chester Louis III, Computor Rockers, David Michael Cross, Ed DMX, EDMX, House of Brakes, Michael Knight, and Viet Cong. He has released six full albums on Aphex Twin's label Rephlex Records and numerous singles/EPs for both Rephlex and his own label Breakin'. DMX Krew's sound spans several electronic music genres, mostly being rooted in early electro-pop/breakbeat type music. The Collapse of the Wave Function EPs take a more experimental direction.

== Discography ==
Albums

- Sound of the Street (1996)
- Ffressshh! (1997)
- Nu Romantix (1998)
- We are DMX (1999)
- The Collapse of the Wave Function LP (2004)
- Many Worlds (The Collapse of the Wave Function Volume 4) (2005)
- The Transactional Interpretation (The Collapse of the Wave Function Volume 5) (2005)
- Kiss Goodbye (2005)
- Wave:CD (2005)
- Wave Funk (2009)
- The March to the Stars (2010)
- Kiss Goodbye (2010)
- East Side Boogie (2012)
- Shape Shifting Shaman (2014)
- Reith Trax (2014)
- Standing Stones (2015)
- There Is No Enduring Self (2015)
- You Exist (2016)
- Escape-MCP (2016)
- Strange Directions (2017)
- Glad to Be Sad (2019)
- Libertine 12 (2019)
- Opal Beats (2020)
- Ghost Bubbles (2020)
- Loose Gears (2021)
- We Are DMX (2021 Expanded Reissue) (2021)
- Party Life (2022)
- EV 004 (2022)
- Spiral Dance (2024)
- Whispers of an Ancient World III (2024)

EPs and singles

- Got You on My Mind (1994)
- Cold Rockin' with the Krew (1996)
- DMX Bass/Rock Your Body (1997)
- You Can't Hide Your Love (1997)
- You Can't Hide Your Love Remixes (1997)
- Adrenalin Flow (1998)
- Party Beats (1998)
- Showroom Dummies (1998)
- 17 Ways to Break My Heart (1998)
- Smash Metal (1999, Double-7" with Chicks on Speed)
- Back to the Bass (1999)
- Seedy Films (2002)
- Soul Miner (2002)
- The Collapse of the Wave Function Volume 1 (2004)
- The Collapse of the Wave Function Volume 2 (2004)
- Body Destruction (2005)
- Snow Cub (2007)
- Ionospheric Exploration (2008)
- SH101 Triggers MS10 (2008)
- Bass Drop (2008)
- Bongard Problems (2009)
- Come to Me (2009)
- Wave Funk Volume 1 (2009)
- That Was Harder Than I Expected (2010)
- Do It All Nite / Worm Hole (2010)
- The Game (2011)
- Funky Dancer / That Wild & Freaky Robot Funk (2011)
- Broken SD140 (2011)
- Cosmic Awakening EP (2011)
- Decaying World EP (2012)
- Galaxy Love / Didn't I? (2012)
- East Side Boogie (2012)
- Broken SD140 Part II (2013)
- Cities in Flight (2013)
- Micro Life (2013)
- Hot Punch / My Metro (2013)
- A New Life (2014)
- Electro Worm (2014)
- Tha Bump! (2015)
- Dogg Fungk (2015)
- 5 Ways 2 Jack (2015)
- RAM Expansion (2015)
- ZSAGI (2015)
- Funk Steps (2015)
- Mini-Owner (2016)
- Space Cucumbers (2016)
- Sludge (2017)
- Peripheral Visions (2017)
- Generic Wizard (2017)
- The Wiggly Worm (2017)
- Synthe Sound EP (2017)
- Artificial Gravity EP (2017)
- 7777 013 (2017)
- What Happened to Peace? (2018)
- Stellar Gateway EP (2018)
- Traditions 07 (2018)
- Don't You Wanna Play? (2019)
- Computor Heart (2019)
- Sweatisfaction (2019)
- Malekko Phase Mod (2019)
- Turn It On (2020)
- Dread It A Go EP (2020)
- Panic Stations EP (2020)
- Modern Body E.P. (2020)
- Wave Funk Volume 2 (2020)
- Wave Funk Volume 3 (2020)
- Mentosse (2020)
- Overseer (2021)
- On the Beach (2021)
- Peripheral Visions (2021)
