= Rephlex Records =

English record label

- Founded: 1991; 35 years ago
- Founder: Richard D. James; Grant Wilson-Claridge
- Defunct: 2014; 12 years ago
- Genre: Electronic, IDM, ambient techno, experimental
- Country of origin: United Kingdom
- Location: Cornwall, then London
- Official website: rephlex.com at the Wayback Machine (archived 11 September 2013)

Rephlex Records was a record label launched in 1991 in Cornwall by electronic musician Richard D. James (aka Aphex Twin) and Grant Wilson-Claridge. The label coined the term braindance to describe the output of Aphex Twin and fellow artists.

== History ==
In 1989, Grant Wilson-Claridge met Richard D. James (a.k.a. Aphex Twin) DJing at The Bowgie, a club located just along the coast from Newquay, Cornwall. According to Wilson-Claridge, back in 1989, "the Bowgie was the best club ever...this was before Newquay turned into the Cornish Ibiza" and it was very difficult to hear new and interesting music. Wilson-Claridge and James used to DJ on alternate weeks. When he noticed that James was playing his own tapes rather than records, Wilson-Claridge suggested that they press up some records. In the beginning, committing Aphex Twin recordings to vinyl was a way of making music the duo's friends wanted to hear. Due to their geographical dis-location they did not have access to the music they wanted to hear and so they decided to create their own, and Rephlex was born. Although the label was founded in 1991 in Cornwall, it moved the year after to London.

On a post to an Internet newsgroup in 1992, the label stated that its intent was to "promote 'Innovation in the dynamics of Acid' – a much loved and misunderstood genre of house music" and to "demonstrate to the rest of the world that British dance music can be entirely original".

Rephlex has released the music of many electronic artists, among them Mike Paradinas, DMX Krew, Luke Vibert, Aleksi Perälä and Squarepusher. The label has also remastered and re-released the early works of 808 State, the Future Sound of London and The Criminal Minds, and relaunched the career of electronic duo producers Black Devil with a re-release of their first record.

James closed Rephlex in 2014, saying "that's something that needed to be done a long time ago. Me and my friend would have drifted apart, but actually the label did keep us together. It got to a point where I'd actually rather be his friend than be in business with him."

== Roster ==
- 808 State
- Arpanet
- Baby Ford
- Black Devil
- Bochum Welt
- Bodenstandig 2000
- Brian Dougans
- The Bug
- Ceephax Acid Crew
- Chimera
- The Criminal Minds
- Cylob
- D'Arcangelo
- Dabrye
- DMX Krew
- Dopplereffekt
- Drexciya
- Ensemble
- EOD
- The Gentle People
- Global Goon
- hecker
- Richard D. James (including releases as AFX, Aphex Twin, Bradley Strider, Caustic Window and the Tuss)
- Jodey Kendrick
- JP Buckle
- Kosmik Kommando
- Leila
- The Lisa Carbon Trio
- Ovuca
- P.P. Roy
- Bogdan Raczynski
- Seefeel
- Squarepusher (including releases as Chaos A.D.)
- Urban Tribe
- Universal Indicator (collective)
- μ-Ziq
- Wisp
- Luke Vibert (including releases as Amen Andrews)
- Vulva
- Yee-King

== See also ==
- Lists of record labels
- List of electronic music record labels
- Rephlex Records discography
