= Richard D. James discography =

Discography of British electronic musician Richard D. James

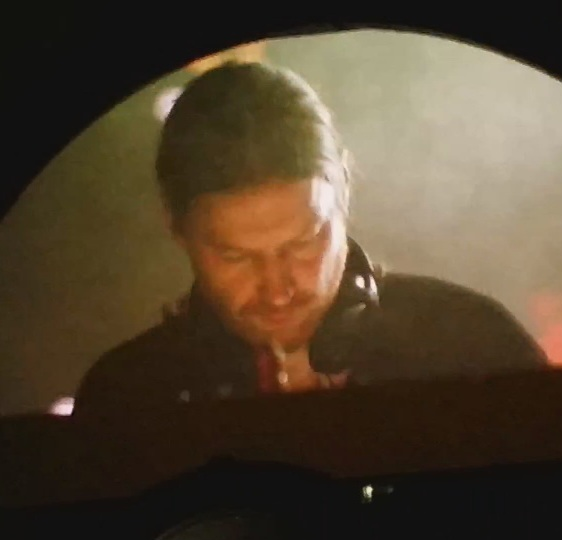
- James performing in 2016
- Studio albums: 6
- Extended plays: 18
- Compilation albums: 4
- Singles: 12
- Music videos: 13

The discography of Richard D. James, a British musician, consists of six studio albums, four compilation albums, 18 extended plays, 12 singles, and 13 music videos released under his best known alias Aphex Twin, one studio album under the alias Polygon Window, one studio album under the alias Caustic Window, and one collaborative album with Mike Paradinas. Three compilation albums and 35 extended plays were released under other aliases.

== As Aphex Twin ==
=== Studio albums ===
Title	Album details	Peak chart positions										Certifications
Title	Album details	UK	AUS	BEL	FRA	GER	IRE	JPN	NOR	US	US Dance	Certifications
Selected Ambient Works 85–92	Released: 9 November 1992; Label: R&S; Format: CD, CS, digital download, vinyl	—	—	—	—	—	—	—	—	—	—	BPI: Silver
Selected Ambient Works Volume II	Released: 7 March 1994; Label: Warp; Format: CD, CS, digital download, vinyl	11	46	5	—	13	97	37	—	135	3	BPI: Silver
...I Care Because You Do	Released: 24 April 1995; Label: Warp; Format: CD, CS, digital download, vinyl	24	—	—	—	—	—	—	—	—	—	
Richard D. James Album	Released: 4 November 1996; Label: Warp; Format: CD, CS, digital download, vinyl	62	—	—	—	—	—	—	—	— (Note: Richard D. James Album did not enter the Billboard 200, but peaked at number 20 on the Top Heatseekers chart.)	—	
Drukqs	Released: 22 October 2001; Label: Warp; Format: CD, digital download, vinyl	22	14 (Note: Drukqs originally peaked at number 87 in Australia in 2001. Its 25th anniversary edition reached number 14 in 2026.)	8	43	—	14	—	36	154	6	BPI: Silver
Syro	Released: 19 September 2014; Label: Warp; Format: CD, digital download, vinyl	8	21	7	53	26	7	8	37	11	1	
"—" denotes a recording that did not chart or was not released in that territory.

=== Compilation albums ===
Title	Album details	Peak chart positions					
Title	Album details	UK	FRA	IRE	US Heat	US Dance	US Indie
Classics	Released: 30 January 1995; Label: R&S; Format: CD, CS, digital download, vinyl	24	—	—	—	—	—
51/13 Aphex Singles Collection	Released: 30 November 1996; Label: Sire; Format: CD	—	—	—	—	—	—
26 Mixes for Cash	Released: 24 March 2003; Label: Warp; Format: CD	63	86	47	29	3	18
Music from the Merch Desk (2016–2023)	Released: 17 December 2024; Label: Warp; Format: digital download	— (Note: Music from the Merch Desk (2016–2023) did not enter the UK Albums Chart, but peaked at number nine on the Official Album Downloads Chart.)	—	—	—	—	—
"—" denotes a recording that did not chart or was not released in that territory.

=== Extended plays ===
Title	EP details	Peak chart positions							Certifications
Title	EP details	UK	AUS	BEL	JPN	US	US Dance	US Heat	Certifications
Analogue Bubblebath	Released: September 1991; Label: Mighty Force; Format: 12-inch	—	—	—	—	—	—	—	
Analog Bubblebath Vol 2	Released: December 1991; Label: Rabbit City; Format: 12-inch	—	—	—	—	—	—	—	
Digeridoo	Released: January 1992; Label: R&S; Format: vinyl	55	—	—	—	—	—	—	
Xylem Tube	Released: June 1992; Label: R&S; Format: vinyl	—	—	—	—	—	—	—	
On	Released: 15 Nov 1993; Label: Warp; Format: vinyl	32	—	—	—	—	—	—	
Ventolin	Released: 27 March 1995; Label: Warp; Format: CD, vinyl	49	—	—	—	—	—	—	
Donkey Rhubarb	Released: 14 August 1995; Label: Warp; Format: CD, digital download, vinyl	78	—	—	—	—	—	—	
Girl/Boy	Released: 19 August 1996; Label: Warp; Format: CD, digital download, vinyl	64	—	—	—	—	—	—	
Come to Daddy	Released: 6 October 1997; Label: Warp; Format: CD, vinyl	36	—	—	—	—	—	37	BPI: Silver
Analord 10	Released: 15 December 2004; Label: Warp; Format: digital download, vinyl	—	—	—	—	—	—	—	
Computer Controlled Acoustic Instruments pt2	Released: 23 January 2015; Label: Warp; Format: CD, digital download, vinyl	36	—	80	24	—	1	—	
Cheetah	Released: 8 July 2016; Label: Warp; Format: CD, CS, digital download, vinyl	14	63	—	43	140	1	—	
Collapse	Released: 14 September 2018; Label: Warp; Format: CD, CS, digital download, vinyl	11	—	—	28	113	2	—	
London 14.09.2019	Released: 14 September 2019; Label: Warp; Format: digital download, vinyl	—	—	—	—	—	—	—	
Manchester 20.09.2019	Released: 20 September 2019; Label: Warp; Format: digital download, vinyl	—	—	—	—	—	—	—	
Peel Session 2	Released: 15 November 2019; Recorded: 1995; Label: Warp; Format: digital download, streaming, vinyl	—	—	—	—	—	—	—	
Blackbox Life Recorder 21f / In a Room7 F760	Released: 28 July 2023; Label: Warp; Format: digital download, streaming, vinyl, CD	—	—	—	38	—	—	—	
London 19.08.2023	Released: 19 August 2023; Label: Warp; Format: vinyl	—	—	—	—	—	—	—	

=== Promotional albums ===
- Words & Music (1994, Sire/Warner Bros. Records PRO-CD-6878). Promotional recording for Selected Ambient Works Volume II; contains edited versions of tracks from that release and portions of an interview with Richard D. James.
- Drukqs 2 Track Promo (2001, Warp Records, DRUKQS1CD). Promotional recording for drukQs, contains edited versions of tracks from that release.

=== Singles ===
Title	Year	Peak chart positions								Album
Title	Year	UK	AUS	DEN	FRA	SWE	NZ	US Heat.	US Dance	Album
"Ventolin"	1995	49	—	—	—	—	—	—	—	...I Care Because You Do
"Girl/Boy"	1995	64	—	19	—	—	—	—	—	Richard D. James Album
"Come to Daddy"	1997	36	—	10	—	—	—	37	—	Come to Daddy
"Windowlicker"	1999	16	70	15	60	53	33	—	– (Note: "Windowlicker" peaked at number 15 on the Dance Singles Sales chart.)	Non-album single
"minipops 67 [120.2]"	2014	167	—	—	—	—	—	—	38	Syro
"MARCHROMT30A edit 2b 96"	2015	—	—	—	—	—	—	—	—	Syro
"3 Gerald Remix / 24 TSIM 2"	2017	—	—	—	—	—	—	—	—	Non-album singles
"Barcelona 16.06.23"	2023	—	—	—	—	—	—	—	—	Non-album singles
"Blackbox Life Recorder 21f"	2023	79	—	—	—	—	—	—	25	Blackbox Life Recorder 21f / in a room7 F760
"#19"	2024	—	—	—	—	—	—	—	—	Selected Ambient Works Volume II (Expanded Edition)
"th1 [evnslower]"	2024	—	—	—	—	—	—	—	—	Selected Ambient Works Volume II (Expanded Edition)
"#3 / Rhubarb Orc. 19.53 Rev"	2024	—	—	—	—	—	—	—	—	Selected Ambient Works Volume II (Expanded Edition)

=== Other charted songs ===
Title	Year	Peak chart positions			Release
Title	Year	UK Sales	UK Physical	UK Vinyl	Release
"Slo Bird Whistle"	2019	70	3	3	Peel Session 2
"Polynomial-C" (Note: "Polynomial-C" was originally released on Xylem Tube in 1992; the chart positions listed here are from its 2025 chart entry following a 12-inch vinyl reissue.)	1992	39	4	4	Xylem Tube
"—" denotes a recording that did not chart or was not released in that territory.

=== Music videos ===
Title	Year	Director
"Schottkey 7th Path"	1993	!K7
"Ageispolis"	1993	Prism Leisure
"On"	1993	Jarvis Cocker
"Ventolin"	1995	Steve Doughton
"Donkey Rhubarb"	1995	David Slade
"Come to Daddy"	1997	Chris Cunningham
"Windowlicker"	1999	Chris Cunningham
"Monkey Drummer"	2001	Chris Cunningham
"Rubber Johnny"	2005	Chris Cunningham
"Nannou"	2005	Laurent Briet
"CIRKLON3 [ Колхозная mix ]"	2016	Ryan Wyer
"T69 Collapse"	2018	Weirdcore
"Blackbox Life Recorder 21f"	2023	Weirdcore

Note: "Rubber Johnny" is a short film that features the song "Afx237 v.7", and "Monkey Drummer" is a short music video for the track "Mt Saint Michel + Saint Michaels Mount", both by director Chris Cunningham and both from the album Drukqs.

== As AFX ==
=== Extended plays ===
Year	Album details
1992	Analogue Bubblebath Vol 3: Released: 1992; Label: Rephlex; Format: 12-inch, CD
1994	Analogue Bubblebath 4: Released: 1 July 1994; Label: Rephlex; Format: 12-inch, CD
1995	Analogue Bubblebath 5: Released: 1995; Label: Rephlex; Format: 12-inch
1995	Hangable Auto Bulb EP: Released: 16 October 1995; Label: Warp; Format: 12-inch
1995	Hangable Auto Bulb EP.2: Released: 11 December 1995; Label: Warp; Format: 12-inch
1997	Analogue Bubblebath Vol 3.1: Released: 1 January 1997; Label: Rephlex; Format: 12-inch
2001	2 Remixes by AFX: Released: 30 July 2001; Label: Rephlex; Format: 12-inch, CD
2003	Smojphace EP: Released: 16 June 2003; Label: Rephlex; Format: 12-inch, CD
2005	Analord 01–09, 11: Released: Analord 01: 24 January 2005; Analord 02: 24 January 2005; Analord 03: 21 February 2005; Analord 04: 21 February 2005; Analord 05: 14 March 2005; Analord 06: 11 April 2005; Analord 07: 25 April 2005; Analord 08: 9 May 2005; Analord 09: 13 June 2005; Analord 11: 13 June 2005; Label: Rephlex; Format: 12-inch
2005	AFX/LFO: Released: 22 August 2005; Label: Warp; Format: 12-inch
2015	Orphaned Deejay Selek 2006–08: Released: 21 August 2015; Label: Warp; Format: 12-inch, CD, digital download
2016	Houston, TX 12.17.16: Released: 17 December 2016; Label: Warp; Format: 12-inch, digital download
2017	London 03.06.17: Released: 3 June 2017; Label: Warp; Format: 12-inch, digital download
2017	Korg Trax+Tunings for Falling Asleep: Released: 14 July 2017; Label: Warp; Format: digital download
2017	Orphans: Released: 19 July 2017; Label: Warp; Format: digital download

=== Compilation albums ===
Year	Album details
2005	Hangable Auto Bulb: Released: 31 October 2005; Label: Warp; Format: CD
2006	Chosen Lords: Released: 10 April 2006; Label: Rephlex; Format: CD

== Releases under other aliases ==
=== Studio albums ===
Year	Album details	Alias released under
1993	Surfing on Sine Waves: Released: 11 January 1993; Label: Warp; Format: CD, CS, 2×LP (Note: An expanded edition was released by Warp on 26 September 2025, on 3×LP, CD and 24-bit WAV formats. It includes bonus tracks from the companion EP Quoth.)	Polygon Window
1996	Expert Knob Twiddlers: Released: 24 June 1996; Label: Rephlex; Format: CD, CS, 2×LP	Mike & Rich (with Mike Paradinas)
2007	Rush Up Edge • Released: 25 June 2007 • Label: Rephlex	The Tuss
2014	Caustic Window: Released: 16 June 2014; Recorded: 1992–1994; Label: Rephlex; Format: 2×LP, CD-R, digital download	Caustic Window

=== Compilation albums ===
Year	Album details	Alias released under
1998	Compilation: Released: 1 June 1998; Label: Rephlex; Format: CD, 3×LP	Caustic Window

=== Extended plays ===
Year	Album details	Alias released under
1992	Pac-Man: Released: 1 January 1992; Label: FFRR; Format: 7-inch, 12-inch, CD, CS	Power-Pill
1992	Joyrex J4 EP: Released: 1 July 1992; Label: Rephlex; Format: 12-inch	Caustic Window
1992	Joyrex J5 EP: Released: 1 July 1992; Label: Rephlex; Format: 12-inch	Caustic Window
1993	Bradley's Robot: Released: 1993; Label: Rephlex; Format: 12-inch	Bradley Strider
1993	Quoth: Released: 22 March 1993; Label: Warp; Format: 12-inch, CD	Polygon Window
1993	Joyrex J9i: Released: 1 September 1993; Label: Rephlex; Format: 10-inch	Caustic Window
1993	Joyrex J9ii: Released: 1 December 1993; Label: Rephlex; Format: 12-inch	Caustic Window
1994	GAK: Released: 6 June 1994; Label: Warp; Format: 12-inch, CD	GAK
1995	Bradley's Beat: Released: 1995; Label: Rephlex; Format: 12-inch	Bradley Strider
2007	Confederation Trough: Released: 7 May 2007; Label: Rephlex; Format: 12-inch, CD	The Tuss
2007	Rushup Edge: Released: 25 June 2007; Label: Rephlex; Format: 3×LP, CD	The Tuss
