= Neill Gorton =

English special effects artist (born 1969)

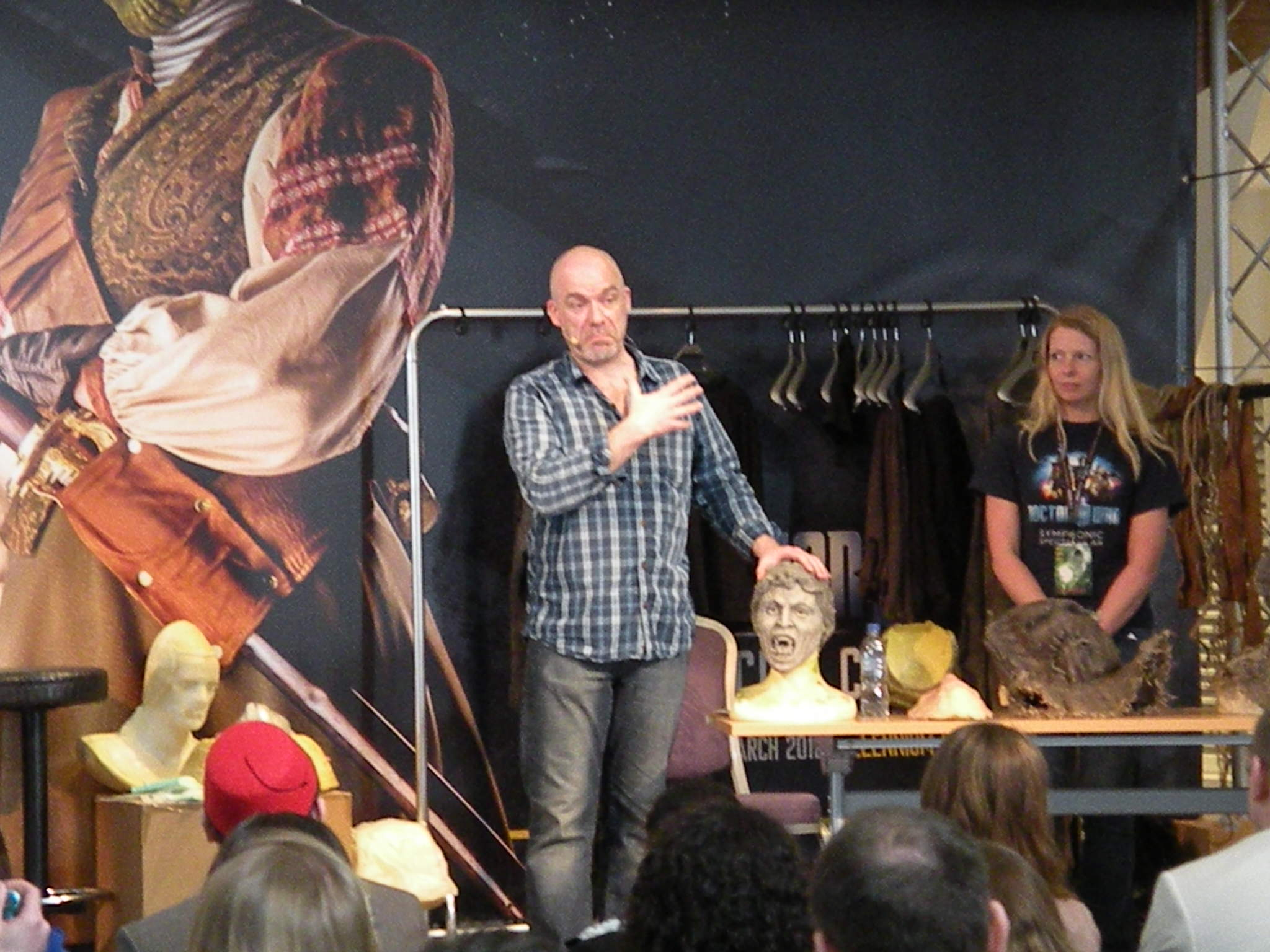
- Neill Gorton presenting at a Doctor Who convention
- Born: 6 September 1969 (age 56); Liverpool, England
- Occupations: Special effect artist, make-up artist, visual effect artist

Neill Gorton (born 6 September 1969) is an English special effects artist, visual effects specialist and make-up artist specialised in animatronics and prosthetics. He is known for his work on films like Saving Private Ryan (1998) and Children of Men (2006) and the series Doctor Who (2005).

== Career ==
Gorton entered the film industry already at the age of 17. Early on, he started to work for Hollywood film productions in co-operation with directors like Steven Spielberg and Alfonso Cuarón and actors such as Johnny Depp, Michael Caine and Christopher Lee. He is responsible for the design of most Doctor Who villains and monsters, including the modern update of Davros. He won the BAFTA Awards four times with six nominations and won the RTS Awards two times with five nominations. He was nominated one time for the OFTA awards. Gorton and Rob Mayor are the directors of the company Millennium FX, which is focused on cutting edge prosthetics, animatronics, and special make-up FX. He is also the director of Gorton Studio, which offers courses for trainees up to professionals in screen prosthetics. He is also a visiting professor at the University of Bolton.

== Filmography ==
=== Film ===
- The Unholy (1988)
- The Lair of the White Worm (1988)
- Hellbound: Hellraiser II (1988)
- Nightbreed (1990)
- Revenge of Billy the Kid (1992)
- Funny Man (1994)
- Judge Dredd (1995)
- Saving Private Ryan (1998)
- Alice in Wonderland (1999)
- The Calling (2000)
- Flex (2000)
- Les âmes fortes (2001)
- The Last Minute (2001)
- From Hell (2001)
- Cruise of the Gods (2002)
- 24 Hour Party People (2002)
- Close Your Eyes (2002)
- This Little Life (2003)
- Lara Croft Tomb Raider: The Cradle of Life (2003)
- The Actors (2003)
- The League of Extraordinary Gentlemen (2003)
- The Order (2003)
- Five Children and It (2004)
- Enduring Love (2004)
- Gender Swap (Documentary, 2004))
- Rubber Johnny (Short film, 2005)
- Sahara (2005)
- The Walk (2005)
- Children of Men (2006)
- Longford (2006)
- Severance (2006)
- Wishbaby (2007)
- Frankenstein (2007)
- Flawless (2007)
- Becoming Jane (2007)
- Phoo Action (2008)
- Inkheart (2008)
- The Brothers Bloom (2008)
- The Oxford Murders (2008)
- The Color of Magic (2008)
- Vampire Killers (2009)
- Cha'mone Mo'Fo'Selecta! A Tribute to Michael Jackson (2009)
- The Fattest Man in Britain (2009)
- The Wolfman (2010)
- Dead Cert (2010)
- Thor (2011)
- The Girl (2012)
- Chernobyl Diaries (2012)
- Yamla Pagla Deewana 2 (2013)
- One Direction: This Is Us (Documentary, 2013)
- Les Dawson: An Audience with That Never Was (Documentary, 2013)
- The Harry Hill Movie (2013)
- Frankenstein (2015)

=== Television ===
- Space Precinct (1994)
- The 10th Kingdom (5 episodes, 2000)
- Dr. Terrible's House of Horrible (2 episodes, 2001)
- The Infinite Worlds of H.G. Wells (2001)
- Ant & Dec's Saturday Night Takeaway (2002)
- Strange (2003)
- Little Britain (14 episodes, 2003–2004)
- Silent Witness (12 episodes, 2003–2004)
- Messiah: The Promise (2004)
- Hex (3 episodes, 2005)
- Help (2005)
- The Virgin Queen (6 episodes, 2005)
- Bodies (1 episode, 2005)
- Doctor Who (2006–2018, 2023–present)
- Jackanory (1 episode, 2006)
- The Sarah Jane Adventures (35 episodes, 2007–2009)
- Jekyll (6 episodes, 2007)
- Being Human (14 episodes, 2008–2010)
- Torchwood (8 episodes, 2009)
- Any Human Heart (TV series) (4 episodes, 2010)
- Bellamy's People (8 episodes, 2010)
- Wizards vs. Aliens (18 episodes, 2012–2014)
- Fool Britannia (6 episodes, 2013)
- Spotless (1 episode, 2014)
- The Smoke (1 episode, 2014)
- Ludus (1 episode, 2014)
- My Wild Affair: Aisha (1 episode, 2014)

== Awards ==
=== British Academy Film Awards ===
British Academy Film Awards
Year	Category	Film	Result	Ref
2006	Best Make-Up & Hair Design	Help	Won	
2007	Best Make-Up & Hair Design	The Catherine Tate Show	Nominated	
2013	Best Make-Up & Hair Design	The Girl	Nominated	

=== BAFTA Awards, Wales ===
BAFTA Awards, Wales
Year	Category	Film	Result	Ref
2006	Best Make-Up (Y Coluro Gorau)	Doctor Who	Won	
2007	Best Make-Up (Y Coluro Gorau)	Doctor Who	Won	
2008	Best Make-Up (Y Coluro Gorau)	Doctor Who	Won	

=== Royal Television Society, UK ===
Royal Television Society, UK
Year	Category	Film	Result	Ref
2005	Best Make Up Design – Drama	Doctor Who	Nominated	
2005	Best Make Up Design – Drama	Help	Won	
2006	Best Make Up Design – Drama	Doctor Who	Nominated	
2006	Best Make Up Design – Entertainment	The Catherine Tate Show	Nominated	
2006	Best Visual Effects	Bodies	Nominated	
2008	Best Special Effects	Being Human	Won	
2010	Best Make-Up Design: Drama	The Fattest Man in Britain	Nominated	

=== Online Film and Television Association ===
Year	Category	Film	Result	Ref
2013	Best Makeup/Hairstyling in a Non-Series	The Girl	Nominated	
