= Mini pops =

Mini pops, Minipops or similar may refer to:

- Minipops, an early-1980s British television series
- Korg Mini Pops, an early drum machine range from the late 1960s and the 1970s
- Minny Pops, an Amsterdam-based new wave/electronic/art punk band active from the late-1970s to the mid-1980s
- Mini Pop Kids, a Canadian music line by K-tel
- "minipops 67 (120.2)", a song by Aphex Twin
