= Quoth =

Quoth is an archaic synonym of the verbs "to say" or "to speak". Quoth may refer to:

- Quoth (Discworld), a talking raven in the Discworld series of novels by Terry Pratchett
- Quoth (EP), the EP musical release by Polygon Window (Aphex Twin)
