= Monkey Drummer =

2001 film directed by Chris Cunningham

A screenshot of the finished Monkey Drummer

Monkey Drummer is a 2.5-minute-long music video created by British music video director Chris Cunningham in 2001. It features music by Aphex Twin.

== Content ==
The short is a humorous, kinetic study of a mechanical being with nine appendages—six arms, two legs, and one drumstick penis—all seemingly controlled by the head of a monkey, though it is unclear what is in control. Each flesh-and-blood body part juts from a black steel appendage and acts human, while being controlled mechanically.

The music playing in the video is the first two and a half minutes of "Mt Saint Michel + Saint Michaels Mount" by Aphex Twin. It is the 10th track on his album Drukqs, which was released in 2001.

== Production ==
The owner of the different body parts playing in the video is Sigtryggur Baldursson, a founding member of Icelandic rock band The Sugarcubes, and a retired member of the band Kukl. He was shot multiple times in various positions with his torso being removed in post-production and replaced with a mechanical torso.

"The idea came from those little mechanical windup monkeys from the last century, the ones with the red faces. ... Thought it would be really amazing to see a 21st Century one that was drumming to something ridiculously insane like a really fast Aphex Twin track."

Head puppetry was performed by Paul "Slash" Morris and Justin Flack.

== Release ==
The video was commissioned by the Anthony d'Offay Gallery in London and was meant to be a companion piece to his Flex commercial, but it was not completed in time for the exhibition in September 2000 and instead made its debut at the Venice Biennale's 49th International Exhibition of Art in June 2001. It subsequently went on to run in several exhibitions such as the Edinburgh Festival, Edinburgh College of Art, Scotland.

== Further information ==
- The video was distributed on a Creative Review DVD in November 2001, and is also featured on the DVD Directors Label: The Work of Director Chris Cunningham, which was released in 2003.
- The video went on to win Best 3D animation in a music video in the International Monitor Awards in 2002.

== See also ==
- Rubber Johnny
