= Digeridoo (EP) =

EP by the Aphex Twin
- Released: January 1992
- Genre: Acid techno; breakbeat
- Length: 25:15
- Label: R&S Records / Outer Rhythm
- Producer: Richard D. James

Richard D. James chronology
Analog Bubblebath Vol 2 (1991)	Digeridoo (1992)	Pac-Man (1992)

CD cover

Digeridoo is an extended play record by the electronic music producer and musician Aphex Twin. It was released in January 1992 through R&S Records. The title track had previously been released as "Aboriginal Mix" on Analog Bubblebath Vol 2.

The UK edition, released in April 1992, entered the Dance Singles Chart at No. 10, and the main Singles Chart at No. 55, on 9 May.

"Digeridoo" does not contain an actual didgeridoo sample. Instead, James spent three days creating an "electronic simulacrum".

On May 31st, 2024, an expanded edition of the EP was released.

== Track listing ==
All tracks are by Richard D. James.

=== CD version ===
No.	Title	Length
1.	"Digeridoo" (Analogue Bubblebath 2)	7:11
2.	"Analogue Bubblebath 1"	4:44
3.	"Flaphead"	7:00
4.	"Phloam"	5:33

=== Vinyl version ===
Side A
No.	Title	Length
1.	"Digeridoo"	7:11
2.	"Flap Head"	6:41

Side B
No.	Title	Length
1.	"Phloam"	5:33
2.	"Isoprophlex"	6:23

=== Expanded Edition ===
No.	Title	Length
1.	"Digeridoo"	7:12
2.	"Flap Head"	7:00
3.	"Phloam"	5:33
4.	"Isoprophlex"	6:23
5.	"Digeridoo (Cr7e Version)"	7:25
6.	"Digeridoo (Live in Cornwall) (Cr7e Version)"	6:26
7.	"Isoprophlex (Slow) (Cr7e Version)"	8:25
8.	"Phloam (Cr7e Version)"	5:49
9.	"Isoprophlex (Cr7e Version)"	6:23
10.	"Flap Head (Cr7e Version)"	7:54

== Charts ==
Chart performance for Digeridoo
Chart (1992)	Peak position
UK Singles (OCC)	55
UK Dance Singles (CIN)	10

Chart performance for Digeridoo
Chart (2024)	Peak position
UK Album Downloads (OCC)	20
UK Dance Albums (OCC)	2
