= Rushup Edge (album) =

Studio album by the Tuss
- Released: 25 June 2007
- Genres: Electronic; acid techno; drill and bass
- Length: 32:48 (CD/LP); 56:03 (Digital)
- Label: Rephlex
- Producer: Richard D. James (Credited as Karen Tregaskin)

The Tuss chronology
Confederation Trough (2007)	Rushup Edge (2007)

Rushup Edge is an album by the British electronic music artist Richard D. James. It is his only LP using the alias The Tuss, and was originally released on 25 June 2007 on CD and vinyl through Rephlex, with it later being re-released with extra tracks on James' web store on 20 July 2017. It was James' last released project until the 2014 studio album Syro.

== Background ==
The Tuss had originally made their debut through the Confederation Trough EP. In a press release by Rephlex Records, a label owned by both Richard D. James and Grant Wilson-Claridge, it was revealed that The Tuss had been discovered by the label through MySpace. However, due to a variety of associations through other MySpace pages and CD notes, it was revealed that James himself was behind the project. Later in 2017, James added Rushup Edge to his web store with bonus tracks, confirming his involvement in the project.

== Composition ==
Critics have described Rushup Edge as electronic, breakcore, and techno. In a review of the project for Pitchfork, Mark Richardson commented that "Synthacon 9" consisted of "propulsive techno" and said it was "full of ideas". Richardson also commented on "Shiz Ko E", stating that it was "comparatively straight electro" and that the track made use of warped vocals. In a piece for The Quietus, Joe Clay discussed "Rushup I Bank 12", talking about its "mangled machine funk", its use of drum programming and its "Human League-esque chord sequences". Patric Fallon of Stereogum called the track "Death Fuck" "malevolent" and compared its similarities to Drukqs and Death Grips.

== Release ==
Rushup Edge was released on 25 June 2007 through Rephlex on CD and 3xLP. The release marked the last music published by James until the release of his 2014 album Syro, released under the Aphex Twin alias. On 20 July 2017, over ten years after the release of Rushup Edge, the album was digitally reissued on James' web store, this time with the inclusion of a variety of bonus tracks.

== Reception ==
Professional ratings
Review scores
Source	Rating
AllMusic	4/5 stars
Pitchfork	7.8/10
PopMatters	7/10
Tiny Mix Tapes	4/5 marks

Rushup Edge was well received by critics. In a review for AllMusic, Ned Raggett concluded that the album was not a "revisiting of the past," but was instead a "return to some of its spirit that turns out very well." Mark Richardson of Pitchfork noted the album's "more breakbeat-driven approach to rhythm" and that it focused less on repetition, in contrast to the Analord series. Writing about the album for Tiny Mix Tapes, Split Foster stated that the tracks on Rushup Edge were evidence of "a good producer’s deserved claim to the titles of composer, sculptor, and musician" and that the album's production required "a mastery of both machine and motion". In a piece for PopMatters, Tim O'Neil enjoyed the tracks on the album, but was confused about James' release strategy with the project and the pseudonyms used. Niall Byrne of Nialler9 said that there were "so many ideas inherent in each of the 6 tracks that it demands repeated listens".

In a list of Aphex Twin albums from worst to best, Stereogum placed Rushup Edge at ten, stating that the album was "something of a novelty record for Aphex Twin completists," but that the album and James' other releases "offer plenty of uncanny music to try to wrap your head around." In a list of the 50 best Aphex Twin tracks, Fact placed "Last Rushup 10" at number 50, and stated that "Rushup Edge is a fun if inessential set of rainbow-coloured acid."

In 2025, Resident Advisor ranked Rushup Edge at number 26 in their list of "The Best Electronic Records 2000–25"; in the accompanying writeup, contributor Gabriel Szatan named it James' best record since the 1990s, adding: "Welding the tangy acid of Analord to new frontiers in drill & bass, as on synapse-searing highlights 'Rushup I Bank 12' and 'Death Fuck,' Rushup Edge is pure Aphex cut with no muck. Playful, faintly ridiculous, a record that precisely one person in eight billion could pull off."

== Track listing ==
Rushup Edge track listing
No.	Title	Length
1.	"Synthacon 9"	6:22
2.	"Last Rushup 10"	6:36
3.	"Shiz Ko E"	3:08
4.	"Rushup I Bank 12"	4:41
5.	"Death Fuck (Note: titled "H949" on digital releases)"	6:39
6.	"Goodbye Rute"	5:22
Total length:		32:49

aphextwin.warp.net bonus tracks
No.	Title	Length
7.	"goodbye jo [original live mixdown]"	4:05
8.	"1st rushup m,+3"	2:17
9.	"computerband 2000 m,+3"	2:22
10.	"oslo 2 +6.1"	2:52
11.	"[S770/SCI 3000, powertran] beautiful Japanese people"	4:57
12.	"talkin2u mix2 +9"	3:08
13.	"stride portugal"	3:33
Total length:		56:03
