= Korg Mini Pops =

Drum machines

The Mini Pops were a number of early analog drum machines from the Japanese musical equipment company Korg during the late 1960s and the 1970s. The machines were based around a number of preset rhythm patterns, such as waltz, samba, rhumba, bossa nova, tango, slow rock, swing, and rock 1 and 2.

== Models ==
=== Minipops 3 ===
Released 1967, and features four drum sounds.

=== Minipops 5 ===
Released in 1966.

=== Minipops 7 ===
The Mini-Pops 7 released in 1966, featured 15 drums sounds and 20 patterns. French musician Jean-Michel Jarre used it throughout his breakthrough album, Oxygene. Some rhythms were achieved by overlaying two of the presets in a manner not intended by the machine's original design, and "Parts V", "VI" and "VII" of Equinoxe featured the Rock 1 pattern.

Aphex Twin used it on his album Syro, and in homage named a single "minipops 67 [120.2]". Echo and the Bunnymen also used the Mini-Pops 7 drum machine at the beginning of their career.

A variant of this instrument was sold in the US under the Univox brand, as the Univox SR-95. This featured slightly different "Beguine" and "Slow Rock" rhythms, and was missing the rimshot of the Mini-Pops 7.

=== Minipops 20 S ===
Released 1967. The S denoted stereo

=== Minipops 35 ===
Released 1976. Features 6 drum sounds and 9 patterns.

=== Minipops 120 ===
Released 1976. Features 6 drum sounds and 16 patterns. This was also sold in the United States under the Univox brand.

=== Minipops Junior ===
Released 1972. Features 10 preset rhythms. also has a footswitch to stop and start the rhythms.

A Minipops Junior was used by Echo and the Bunnymen on their debut single, "The Pictures on My Wall."

== Gallery ==
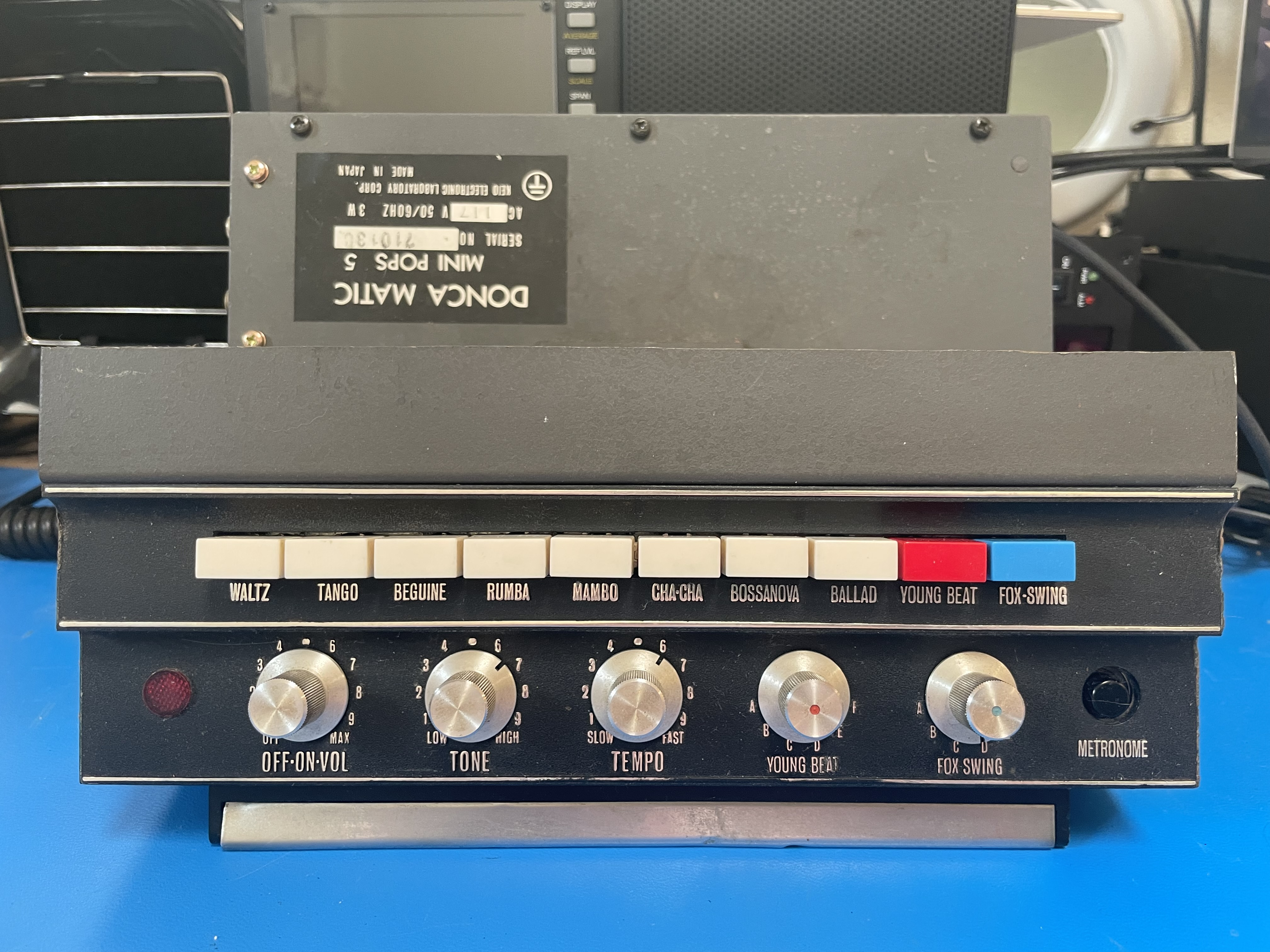
Korg Mini-Pops 5

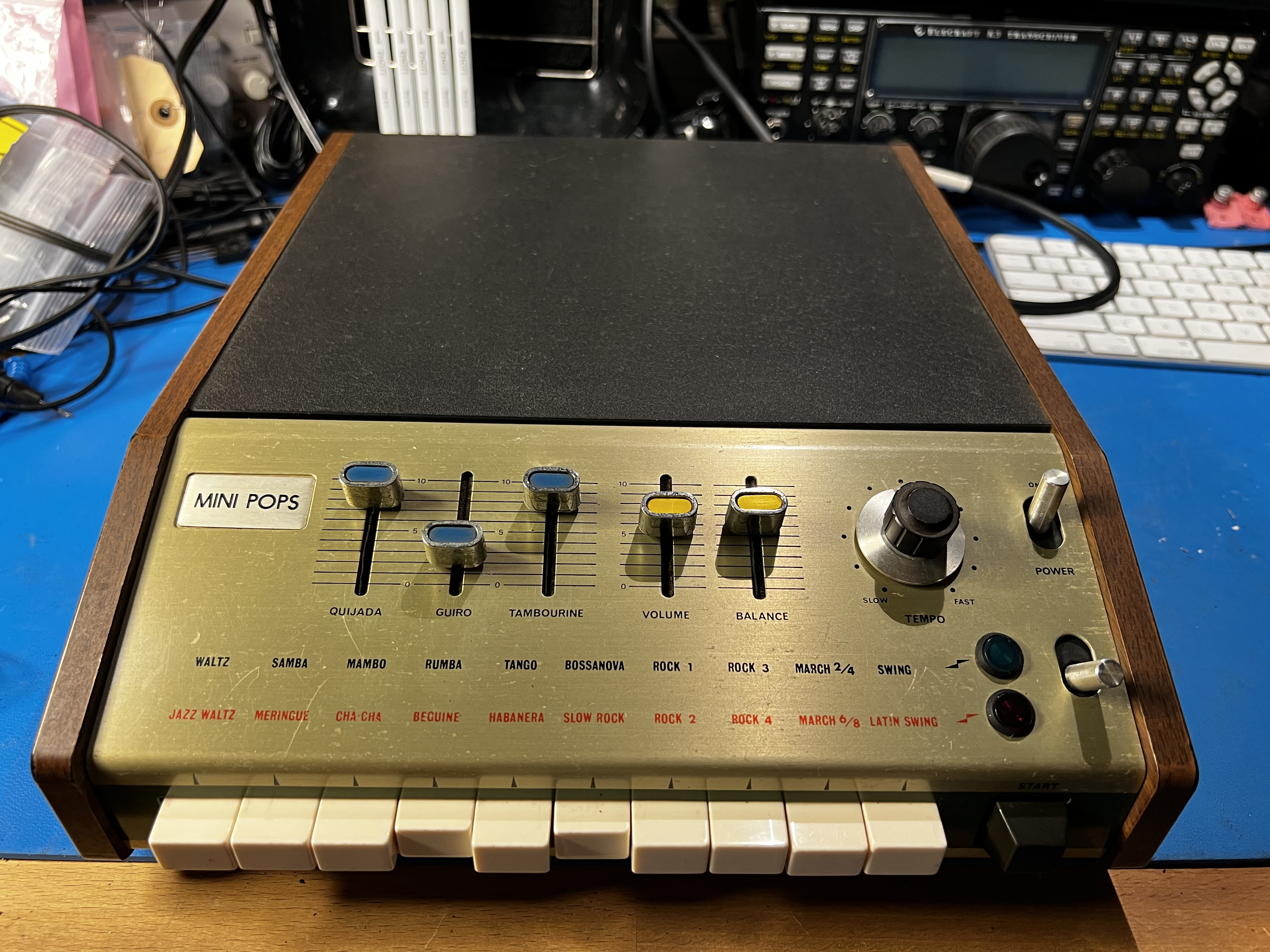
Korg Mini-Pops 7

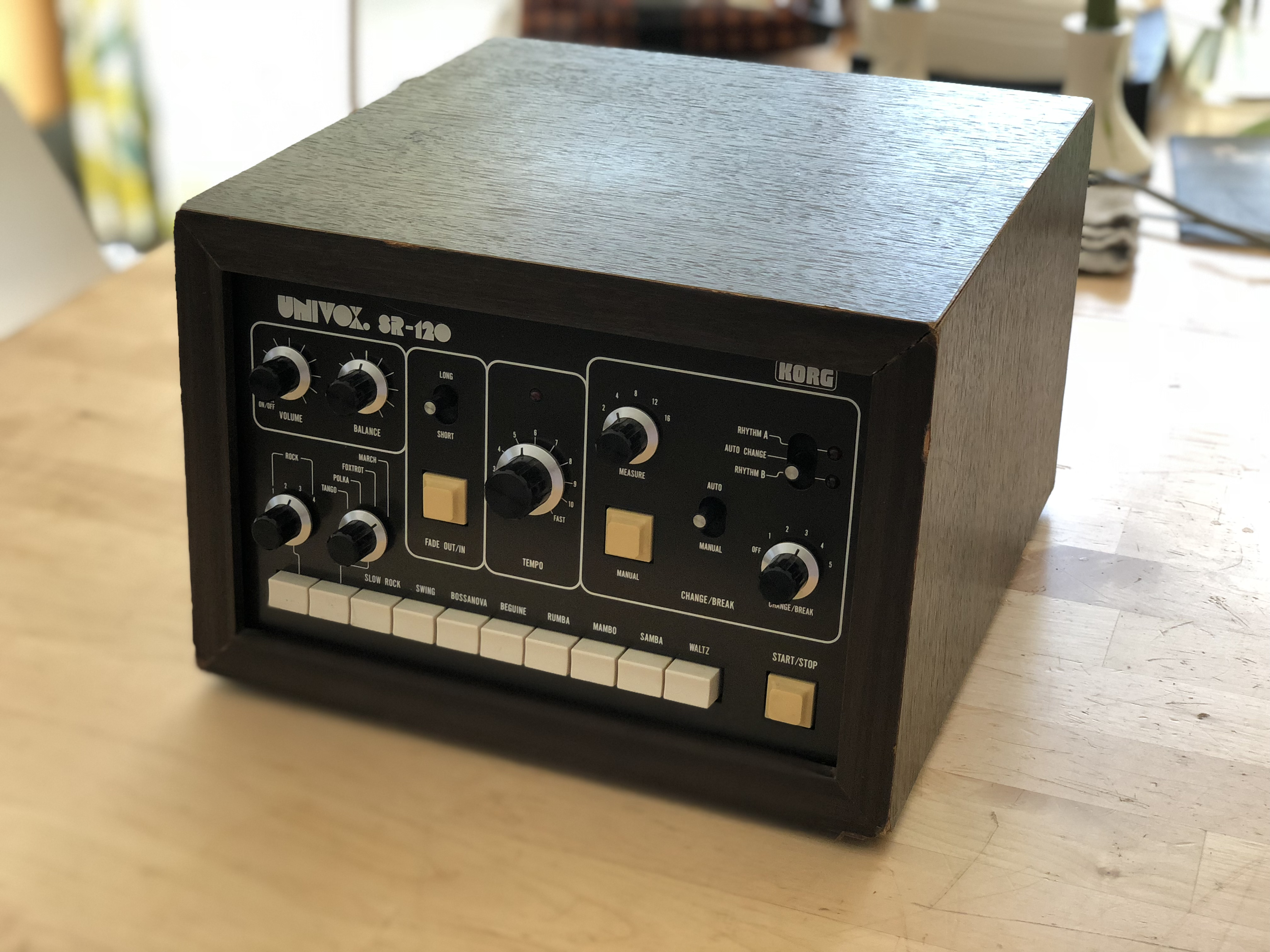
Korg Mini-Pops SR-120 Desktop

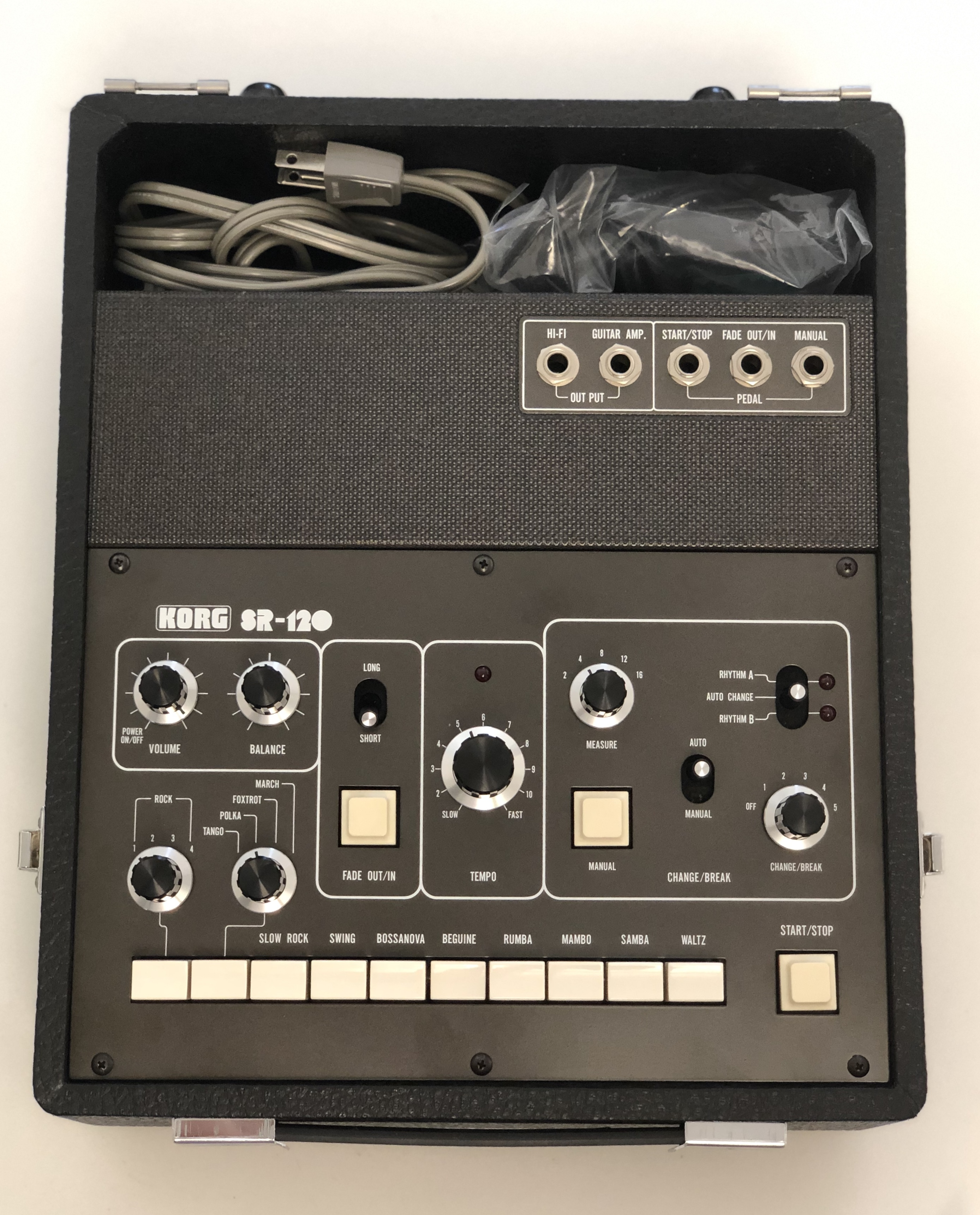
Korg Mini-Pops SR-120 Portable
