= Compilation (Caustic Window album) =

Compilation album by Caustic Window
- Released: 1 June 1998 (UK); 17 November 1998 (US)
- Genres: Acid house; techno; industrial
- Length: 58:12
- Label: Rephlex (CAT009)
- Producer: Richard D. James

Richard D. James chronology
Come to Daddy (1997)	Compilation (1998)	Windowlicker (1999)

Professional ratings
Review scores
Source	Rating
Allmusic	4/5 stars

Compilation (also known as Caustic Window Compilation) is a compilation album by Richard D. James under the pseudonym Caustic Window. The album consists of most of the tracks from the EPs Joyrex J4 EP, Joyrex J5 EP, Joyrex J9i and Joyrex J9ii.

== Notes ==
"Humanoid Must Not Escape"
Album version, as it appeared on Compilation

- "AFX 114" has the same drum rhythm as "Phlange Phace", which can be found on Aphex Twin's early Xylem Tube EP and the Classics compilation.
- "Fantasia" allegedly contains samples from Seka's Fantasies, the same pornographic film that was sampled for "Come on You Slags!" from James' ...I Care Because You Do album.
- "Italic Eyeball" samples Julie Andrews as Maria von Trapp in The Sound of Music as she sings "Perhaps I had a wicked childhood" (forwards and in reverse)
- "Humanoid Must Not Escape" features distorted samples from the David Bowie film The Man Who Fell to Earth (the "Let's fuck!" and "Yeah yeah!") and the arcade game Berzerk.
- "We Are the Music Makers (Hardcore Mix)" samples Gene Wilder from the 1971 film Willy Wonka & the Chocolate Factory.
- "The Garden of Linmiri" was featured in a Gerard de Thame-directed television advertisement for Pirelli's P6000 tyres featuring Carl Lewis. It previously appeared on the 1993 Disco B Energy '93 compilation.

== Track listing ==
All songs written and composed by Richard D. James.

No.	Title	Original EP	Length
1.	"Joyrex J4"	Joyrex J4 EP	4:30
2.	"AFX 114"	Joyrex J4 EP	1:21
3.	"Cordialatron"	Joyrex J4 EP	4:44
4.	"Italic Eyeball"	Joyrex J4 EP	4:25
5.	"Pigeon Street"	Joyrex J4 EP	0:23
6.	"Astroblaster"	Joyrex J5 EP	5:29
7.	"On the Romance Tip"	Joyrex J5 EP	5:06
8.	"Joyrex J5"	Joyrex J5 EP	6:54
9.	"Fantasia"	Joyrex J9i, Joyrex J9ii	6:02
10.	"Humanoid Must Not Escape"	Joyrex J9i	5:42
11.	"Clayhill Dub"	Joyrex J9ii	3:24
12.	"The Garden of Linmiri"	Joyrex J9ii	6:10
13.	"We Are the Music Makers (Hardcore Mix)"	Joyrex J9ii	4:01
Total length:			58:12

== See also ==
- Richard D. James discography
