= MetaSynth =

Sound design and music production software

MetaSynth is a sound design and music production tool developed by U&I Software for Classic Mac OS that allows the creation of sound from images. It was most notably used on The Matrix for bullet-speed special effects. It has also appeared on the electronic artist Aphex Twin's single "Windowlicker" in the title track and the B-side track "ΔM_{i}^{−1} = −αΣ_{n=1}^{N}D_{i}[n][Σ_{j∈C[i]}F_{ji}[n − 1] + Fext_{i}[n^{−1}]]".

== Awards ==
- Electronic Musician 2006 Editor's Choice Award for Best Sound-design Application
- Electronic Musician 1999 Editor's Choice Award
- Keyboard Magazine Key Buy Award (April '98 and July '00)
- MacWorld Eddy Nomination, TEC award nomination
- Musician Magazine Editor's Pick (1999)
