= Directors Label =

Series of DVDs devoted to notable music video directors

Directors Label is a series of DVDs released by Palm Pictures compiling the work of notable music video directors.

The series' first three volumes, featuring the work of Spike Jonze, Chris Cunningham, and Michel Gondry, were released in 2003. Four new volumes were released in 2005, this time featuring Mark Romanek, Jonathan Glazer, Anton Corbijn and Stéphane Sednaoui.

Though future releases in the series are unlikely, according to series creator Richard Brown, other directors that were at one point rumoured or planned for releases include Mike Mills, Hammer & Tongs, Shynola, Jean-Baptiste Mondino and Roman Coppola, as well as a planned hip-hop and R&B series featuring Paul Hunter, Director X, and Chris Robinson.

In 2002, predating the Directors Label series, Palm Pictures released a DVD of Hype Williams' work, titled Hype Williams: The Videos Vol. 1.

== Volume 1: The Work of Director Spike Jonze ==
The first installment of the series centered on director Spike Jonze and was released on October 28, 2003. It includes interviews and audio commentaries from musicians such as Fatboy Slim, Weezer, The Pharcyde, Daft Punk, The Chemical Brothers, Björk, Christopher Walken and Puffy, plus the making of "Drop" with The Pharcyde. It also includes a commentary on a selection of the videos by the Beastie Boys. Enclosed is a book comprising Jonze's photographs, drawings and interviews.

=== Track listing ===
All videos directed by Spike Jonze, except where noted.

Side one
No.	Title	Performer(s)	Length
1.	"California"	Wax	2:22
2.	"Sure Shot"	Beastie Boys	3:26
3.	"Drop"	The Pharcyde	3:33
4.	"Cannonball" (co-directed with Kim Gordon)	The Breeders	3:43
5.	"Sabotage"	Beastie Boys	3:02
6.	"Da Funk"	Daft Punk	5:39
7.	"What's Up Fatlip?"	Fatlip	3:22
8.	"Undone (The Sweater Song)"	Weezer	4:13
9.	"Praise You" (directed by Adam Spiegel as Spike Jonze as Richard Koufey, the founder of the Torrance Community Dance Group with Roman Coppola)	Fatboy Slim	5:46
10.	"Feel the Pain"	Dinosaur Jr.	4:38
11.	"If I Only Had a Brain"	MC 900 Ft. Jesus	3:33
12.	"Sky's the Limit"	The Notorious B.I.G.	4:53
13.	"Weapon of Choice"	Fatboy Slim	3:46
14.	"Buddy Holly"	Weezer	4:00
15.	"Elektrobank"	The Chemical Brothers	5:47
16.	"It's Oh So Quiet"	Björk	3:59

Side two
No.	Title	Length
1.	"How They Get There"	2:25
2.	"Mark Paints"	1:04
3.	"The Oasis Video that Never Happened"
4.	"Rockafeller Skank"	2:54
5.	"The Woods"	1:26
6.	"What's Up Fatlip? (the documentary)"	43:59
7.	"Amarillo by Morning"
8.	"Torrance Rises"

== Volume 2: The Work of Director Chris Cunningham ==
=== Music videos ===
- "Second Bad Vilbel" by Autechre
- "Come to Daddy" by Aphex Twin
- "Only You" by Portishead
- "Frozen" by Madonna
- "Afrika Shox" by Leftfield featuring Afrika Bambaataa
- "Come On My Selector" by Squarepusher
- "Windowlicker" by Aphex Twin
- "All Is Full of Love" by Björk

=== Other work ===
- Monkey Drummer – Video installation. Featuring music by Aphex Twin
- flex – Excerpt from video installation. Featuring music by Aphex Twin
- Mental Wealth – PlayStation commercial
- Photocopier – Never seen Levi's commercial
- Engine – Nissan commercial, featuring music by Boards of Canada
- Windowlicker – Bleeped version

=== 52 Page Book ===
Behind the scenes photographs, storyboards, sketchbook drawings, record cover art and interview

== Volume 3: The Work of Director Michel Gondry ==
=== Music videos ===
- "The Hardest Button to Button" by The White Stripes
- "Come into My World" by Kylie Minogue
- "Dead Leaves and the Dirty Ground" by The White Stripes
- "Fell in Love with a Girl" by The White Stripes
- "Star Guitar" by The Chemical Brothers
- "Let Forever Be" by The Chemical Brothers
- "Jóga" by Björk
- "Deadweight" by Beck
- "Bachelorette" by Björk
- "Everlong" by Foo Fighters
- "Around the World" by Daft Punk
- "Sugar Water" by Cibo Matto
- "Hyperballad" by Björk
- "Like a Rolling Stone" by The Rolling Stones
- "Army of Me" by Björk
- "Isobel" by Björk
- "Protection" by Massive Attack
- "Lucas with the Lid Off" by Lucas
- "Human Behaviour" by Björk
- "Le Mia" by IAM
- "La Tour De Pise" by Jean Francois Coen
- "Ma Maison" by Oui Oui
- "Bolide" by Oui Oui
- "Junior Et Sa Voix D'or" by Oui Oui
- "Les Cailloux" by Oui Oui
- "Un Joyeux Noel" by Oui Oui
- "La Ville" by Oui Oui

=== Special features ===
- I've Been 12 Forever (Parts 1 & 2)

=== Stories And Things ===
- La Lettre
- One Day
- Lacuna Inc
- Drugstore – Levi's Commercial
- Smarienberg – Smirnoff Commercial
- Resignation – Polaroid Commercial
- Drumb and Drumber
- Pecan Pie – A short film starring Jim Carrey
- Three Dead People
- My Brother's 24th Birthday
- Tiny
- Spin Art
- Oui Oui – Live concert footage
- Spike Jonze
- Chris Cunningham

=== 52 Page Book ===
Michel's stories, drawings photographs & interviews.

=== Omissions ===
Trailers for "Volume 3: The Work Of Director Michel Gondry" (found on the Volume 1 and Volume 2 DVDs, as well as on Palm Pictures' website) include clips of, as well as references to, Gondry's heavily autobiographical video for Radiohead's "Knives Out." It is unclear why this video was omitted from the final DVD; however, as of June 2008, it is available on the compilation DVD Radiohead: The Best Of, released by EMI after the band had left its contract.

In August 2009, "Knives Out", along with other omissions and more recent works of Gondry's, were released by Partizan Films on a DVD compilation titled Michel Gondry 2: More Videos (Before and After DVD 1).

== Volume 4: The Work of Director Mark Romanek ==
=== Music videos ===
- "99 Problems" (director's cut) by Jay-Z
- "Faint" by Linkin Park
- "Can't Stop" by Red Hot Chili Peppers
- "Hurt" by Johnny Cash
- "Cochise" (director's cut) by Audioslave
- "Hella Good" (director's cut) by No Doubt
- "God Gave Me Everything" by Mick Jagger
- "Got 'til It's Gone" by Janet Jackson
- "Criminal" by Fiona Apple
- "The Perfect Drug" by Nine Inch Nails
- "Devils Haircut" by Beck
- "El Scorcho" (director's cut) by Weezer
- "Novocaine for the Soul" by Eels
- "Little Trouble Girl" by Sonic Youth
- "Scream" (director's cut) by Michael Jackson & Janet Jackson
- "Bedtime Story" by Madonna
- "Strange Currencies" by R.E.M.
- "Cold Beverage" by G. Love & Special Sauce
- "Closer" (director's cut) by Nine Inch Nails
- "Jump They Say" by David Bowie
- "Rain" by Madonna
- "Are You Gonna Go My Way" by Lenny Kravitz
- "Wicked as It Seems" (director's cut) by Keith Richards
- "Free Your Mind" by En Vogue
- "Constant Craving" by k.d. lang

=== Special Features ===
- The Work of Director Mark Romanek (38-minute documentary)
- Romanekian – Ben Stiller, Chris Rock and Robin Williams discuss Mark's work
- The Making of "99 Problems"
- Interviews and commentaries

=== 56 Page Book ===
Includes photographs by Mark Romanek and Spike Jonze interview with Mark

== Volume 5: The Work of Director Jonathan Glazer ==
=== Music videos ===
- "Street Spirit" by Radiohead
- "Virtual Insanity" by Jamiroquai
- "A Song for the Lovers" by Richard Ashcroft
- "Into My Arms" by Nick Cave and the Bad Seeds
- "Rabbit in Your Headlights" by UNKLE
- "The Universal" by Blur
- "Karma Police" by Radiohead
- "Karmacoma" by Massive Attack

=== Special Features ===
- Ride – Wrangler commercial
- Surfer (extended) – Guinness commercial
- Swim Back – Guinness commercial
- Dreamer – Guinness commercial
- Protection – Volkswagen commercial
- Last Orders – Stella Artois commercial
- Whip Round – Stella Artois commercial
- Kung Fu – Levi's commercial
- Odyssey – Levi's commercial
- Bull – Barclays commercial featuring Samuel L. Jackson
- Chicken – Barclays commercial featuring Samuel L. Jackson
- Interviews and Commentaries

=== Films ===
- Sexy Beast (excerpt) You're the Problem
- Interviews with Ray Winstone and Sir Ben Kingsley
- Birth (excerpt) Central Park
- Interviews with Nicole Kidman, Danny Huston, Harris Savides, Milo Addica and Jean-Claude Carrière

=== Tramp ===
Paul Kaye

=== 56 Page Book ===
Includes photographs, sketches, storyboards and interview.

== Volume 6: The Work of Director Anton Corbijn ==
=== Music videos ===
- "Dr. Mabuse” by Propaganda
- "Red Guitar" by David Sylvian
- "Seven Seas" by Echo & the Bunnymen
- "Quiet Eyes" by Golden Earring
- "The Game" by Echo and the Bunnymen
- "Behind the Wheel" by Depeche Mode
- "Atmosphere" by Joy Division
- "My Secret Place" by Joni Mitchell with Peter Gabriel
- "Enjoy the Silence" by Depeche Mode
- "One" (director's cut) by U2
- "Straight to You" by Nick Cave and the Bad Seeds
- "Walking in My Shoes" by Depeche Mode
- "Heart-Shaped Box" by Nirvana
- "Liar" by Rollins Band
- "Hero of the Day" by Metallica
- "Mama Said" by Metallica
- "Barrel of a Gun" by Depeche Mode
- "It's No Good" by Depeche Mode
- "Bleibt Alles Anders" by Herbert Grönemeyer
- "Opus 40" by Mercury Rev
- "Goddess on a Hiway" by Mercury Rev
- "In the Sun" by Joseph Arthur
- "Mensch" by Herbert Grönemeyer
- "Electrical Storm" by U2
- "Re-Offender" by Travis
- "All These Things That I've Done" by The Killers

=== Special Features (stuff) ===
- Beck and Dave Grohl MTV Promos
- U2 – The Making of "Electrical Storm"
- Some YoYo Stuff
- Travis – Love Will Come Through (home made video with Fran Healy)
- Depeche Mode – "It's No Good" tour projections
- Palais Schaumburg – Hockey (Anton's first music video)
- Front 242 – Front By Front
- NotNa – a documentary by Lance Bangs about Anton
- Interviews and commentaries

=== 56 Page Book ===
Anton's photos, text and drawings.

== Volume 7: The Work of Director Stephane Sednaoui ==
=== Music videos ===
- "I Can't Wait" by Mirwais
- "For Real" by Tricky
- "Scar Tissue" by Red Hot Chili Peppers
- "Disco Science" by Mirwais
- "Lotus" by R.E.M.
- "Possibly Maybe" by Björk
- "Ironic" by Alanis Morissette
- "Pumpkin" by Tricky
- "Queer" by Garbage
- "Hell Is Around the Corner" by Tricky
- "Sly" by Massive Attack
- "7 Seconds" by Youssou N'Dour & Neneh Cherry
- "Big Time Sensuality" by Björk
- "Big Time Sensuality" (night version) by Björk
- "Sometimes Salvation" by The Black Crowes
- "Mysterious Ways" by U2
- "Give It Away" by Red Hot Chili Peppers
- "Le Monde De Demain" by NTM
- "Discoteque" (new director's cut) by U2

=== Special Features ===
- Walk on the Wild Side – Short film featuring Lou Reed and inspired by his song
- Army of Me – Animation inspired by Björk's song
- Acqua Natasa – Short film featuring Natasa Vojnovic
- Reve Reche – Stephane's first short film attempt
- Interviews and Commentaries
- Stephane's presentation at New York University Film School

=== 56 Page Book ===
Diary of photos, storyboards, sketches and comments

== Series 1 Box Set ==
Shortly after the release of the first three volumes, Palm Pictures released a box set including all three plus a bonus disc featuring more recent content. Because no additional Cunningham videos were included on the disc, the box set also included a poster with images from the Cunningham disc. Those who purchased the three volumes individually could receive the bonus disc and poster by e-mailing Palm Pictures, but Palm Pictures is no longer able to provide the bonus DVD and Poster.

=== Spike Jonze ===
- "Y Control" (uncut version) by Yeah Yeah Yeahs
- "Island in the Sun" by Weezer
- "Invisible Boards" – A short film excerpt from Yeah Right! a Girl Skateboards film (Co-directed with Rick Howard)

=== Michel Gondry ===
- "I Wonder" by The Willowz
- "Ossamuch!" by Kishu & Co. (original short)

=== Chris, Spike + Michel ===
- Q&A at Virgin

== Series 2 Box Set ==
Palm Pictures released a box set of Volumes 4–7 immediately upon their individual releases. Unlike the first box set, there was no additional content save for the box itself.
