= Joyrex J4 EP =

EP by Caustic Window
- Released: July 1992
- Genre: Techno
- Length: 18:53
- Label: Rephlex Records CAT 004 EP

Richard D. James chronology
Xylem Tube EP (1992)	Joyrex J4 EP (1992)	Joyrex J5 EP (1992)

Joyrex J4 EP is an EP by Richard D. James under the alias Caustic Window. The release is a 12 inch vinyl and has been pressed with both yellow and black labels.

All tracks except "Pop Corn" were later re-released on the album Compilation.

== Track listing ==
=== Side A ===
1. "Joyrex J4" – 4:27
2. "Pop Corn" – 3:38
3. "AFX 114" – 1:20

=== Side B ===
1. "Cordialatron" – 4:43
2. "Italic Eyeball" – 4:24
3. "Pigeon Street" – 0:21
- No track titles appear anywhere on the release; however, track titles came from the later release of Compilation, except for "Pop Corn" which is so called by fan-interpretation of the song written by Gershon Kingsley.
