= Analog Bubblebath Vol 2 =

- Label for side one of Analog Bubblebath Vol 2

EP by Aphex Twin
- Released: December 1991
- Genre: Acid techno; breakbeat
- Length: 14:54
- Label: Rabbit City
- Producer: Richard D. James

Richard D. James chronology
| Analogue Bubblebath (1991) | Analog Bubblebath Vol 2 (1991) | Digeridoo (1992) |

Professional ratings
Review scores
| Source | Rating |
|---|---|
| The Rolling Stone Album Guide | 3/5 stars |

Analog Bubblebath Vol 2 is the second extended play record by the electronic music producer and musician Aphex Twin. It is the second release in the Analogue Bubblebath series (although it is spelled "Analog Bubblebath" on this release).

"Aboriginal Mix" (also known as "Digeridoo") was first aired from a DAT tape by Colin Faver on his Kiss FM show Demo DAT section, leading to the EP being released on Faver and Gordon Matthewman's Rabbit City Records in 1991.

Digeridoo was later picked up by R&S Records and released as a single Digeridoo and on the compilation Classics. All three mixes are identical. In August 2015 James uploaded the third track to SoundCloud with the title "Alien Fanny Farts AB2 q".

== Track listing ==
Side A
| No. | Title | Length |
|---|---|---|
| 1. | "Aboriginal Mix" | 7:11 |

Side B
| No. | Title | Length |
|---|---|---|
| 2. | Untitled | 3:49 |
| 3. | "Alien Fanny Farts" | 3:55 |
| Total length: | | 14:54 |
