= Chris Cunningham =

English video director (born 1970)

- Born: 15 October 1970 (age 56); Reading, Berkshire, England
- Occupations: Filmmaker, video artist, photographer, music producer
- Years active: 1995–present
- Spouse: Jenny Lee Lindberg (m. 2010; div. 2016)

Chris Cunningham (born 15 October 1970) is an English video artist and music video director who directed music videos for electronic musicians such as Autechre, Squarepusher, Aphex Twin and Björk. Early in his career he worked as a comic book artist. He has created art installations and directed short movies. In the mid 2000s, Cunningham began doing music production work, and has also designed album artwork for a variety of musicians. Cunningham worked on a uncompleted movie adaptation of William Gibson's cyberpunk novel Neuromancer.

His style is noted for its use of robotics, body horror and Mickey mousing (syncing action with music).

== Biography ==
=== Early work: comic books and film special effects ===
Between circa 1990 and 1992, he worked as a comic book artist for 2000 AD working under the pseudonym "Chris Halls" (Halls is his stepfather's surname). He worked on comics including Aliens and Judge Dredd Megazine. His contributions included cover paintings and strips.

Also from around 1990, he worked on films including model-making, prosthetic make-up and concept illustrations. He worked on films including Hardware (1990) and Dust Devil (1992) for Richard Stanley, Nightbreed (1990) for Clive Barker, and Alien^{3} (1992) for David Fincher.

After seeing Cunningham's work on the 1995 film version of Judge Dredd, Stanley Kubrick head-hunted Cunningham to work on A.I. Artificial Intelligence. For Kubrick, Cunningham designed and supervised animatronic prototypes of David; the central robot child character. Cunningham worked for over a year on the film. However, around this time Kubrick put the film on hold, with Cunningham going on to pursue a career as a director.

=== Music videos ===
Cunningham has had close ties to Warp Records since his first video for Autechre, "Second Bad Vilbel" in 1995 and Squarepusher's "Come On My Selector" in 1998, which received airplay on MTV's Amp and MTV's Chill Out Zone in Europe. Videos for Aphex Twin's "Come to Daddy" and "Windowlicker" are perhaps his best known. His video for Björk's "All Is Full of Love" won multiple awards, including an MTV music video award for Breakthrough Video and was nominated for a Grammy for Best Short Form Music Video. It was also the first ever music video to win a Gold Pencil at the D&AD Awards. It can still be seen at the Museum of Modern Art in New York. His video for Aphex Twin's "Windowlicker" was nominated for the "Best Video" award at the Brit Awards 2000. He also directed Madonna's "Frozen" video which became an international hit and won the award for Best Special Effects at the 1998 MTV Music Video Awards. Cunningham also came out of a seven-year hiatus from making music videos to direct the video for "Sheena Is a Parasite" by the Horrors.

=== Video art ===
His video installation Flex was first shown in 2000 at the Royal Academy of Arts, and subsequently at the Anthony d'Offay Gallery and other art galleries. Flex was commissioned by the Anthony d'Offay Gallery for the Apocalypse: Beauty & Horror in Contemporary Art exhibition curated by Norman Rosenthal and Max Wigram at the Royal Academy of Arts in 2000.

The Anthony d'Offay Gallery also commissioned Monkey Drummer, a 2½ minute piece intended for exhibition as a companion to Flex at the 2000 Apocalypse exhibition at the Royal Academy of Arts: however, the piece was not finished in time. In it an automaton with nine appendages and the head of a monkey plays the drums to "Mt Saint Michel + Saint Michaels Mount", the 10th track on Aphex Twin's 2001 album drukqs. Monkey Drummer debuted as part of Cunningham's installation at the 49th International Exhibition of Art at the 2001 Venice Biennale, which consisted of a loop of Monkey Drummer, Flex, and his video for Björk's "All Is Full of Love". In 2002 both Flex and Monkey Drummer were exhibited by 5th Gallery in Dublin, Ireland, in an exhibition curated by Artist/Curator Paul Murnaghan,

=== Neuromancer ===
In an August 1999 Spike Magazine interview, cyberpunk author William Gibson stated "He (Chris) was brought to my attention by someone else. We were told, third-hand, that he was extremely wary of the Hollywood process, and wouldn't return calls. But someone else told us that Neuromancer had been his The Wind in the Willows, that he'd read it when he was a kid. I went to London and we met." Gibson is also quoted in the article as saying "Chris is my own 100 percent personal choice...My only choice. The only person I've met who I thought might have a hope in hell of doing it right. I went back to see him in London just after he'd finished the Bjork video, and I sat on a couch beside this dead sex little Bjork robot, except it was wearing Aphex Twin's head. We talked."

In 2000, Cunningham and William Gibson began work on the script for Gibson's 1984 novel Neuromancer. However, because Neuromancer was due to be a big budget studio film, it is rumoured that Cunningham pulled out due to being a first time director without final cut approval. He also felt that too much of the original book's ideas had been cannibalised by other recent films.

=== Music production, 'live' and short films (2004 - present) ===
By 18 November 2004, the Neuromancer film project had been canned. On the FAQ on the William Gibson Board, Gibson stated about the adaptation "... The most recently rumoured version, to have been directed by Chris Cunningham, is now definitely not happening."

Cunningham took a sabbatical from filmmaking to learn about music production and recording and to develop his own music projects.

In 2005, Cunningham released the short film Rubber Johnny as a DVD accompanied by a book of photographs and drawings. Rubber Johnny, a six-minute experimental short film cut to a soundtrack by Aphex Twin remixed by Cunningham, was shot between 2001 and 2004. Shot on DV night-vision, it was made in Cunningham's own time as a home movie of sorts, and took three and half years of weekends to complete. The Telegraph called it "like a Looney Tunes short for a generation raised on video nasties and rave music".

In 2005, Cunningham played a 45-minute audio visual piece performed live in Tokyo and Osaka in front of 30,000+ fans over the two nights at the Japanese electronic music festival Electraglide. These performances evolved into Chris Cunningham Live, a 55-minute long performance piece combining original and remixed music and film. It features remixed, unreleased and brand new videos and music dynamically edited together into a new live piece spread over three screens. The sound accompanying these images includes Cunningham's first publicly performed compositions interspersed with his remixes of other artist's work. Chris Cunningham Live debuted as one of the headline attractions at Warp 20 in Paris on 8 May 2009 with other performances scheduled at festivals in UK, and a number of European cities later in the year. Chris Cunningham Live continued in June 2011, with performances in London, Barcelona, and Sydney, Australia.

During this period Cunningham also made another short film for Warp Films, Spectral Musicians, which remains unreleased. The short film was set to Squarepusher's "My Fucking Sound" from his album Go Plastic; and to a piece called "Mutilation Colony" which was written especially for the short, and was released on the studio album Do You Know Squarepusher.

In 2007, an excerpt from Flex was shown in the Barbican's exhibition Seduced: Art and Sex from Antiquity to Now curated by Martin Kemp, Marina Wallace and Joanne Bernstein. alongside other pieces by Bacon, Klimt, Rembrandt, Rodin and Picasso.

In December 2007 Cunningham produced two tracks, "Three Decades" and "Primary Colours", for Primary Colours, the second album by the Horrors. In the summer of 2008, due to scheduling conflicts with his feature film script writing he could not work on the rest of the album which was subsequently recorded by Geoff Barrow from Portishead.

In 2008, he produced and arranged a new version of 'I Feel Love' for the Gucci commercial that he also directed. He travelled to Nashville to work with Donna Summer to record a brand new vocal for it.

In 2008, Cunningham produced a fashion shoot for Dazed & Confused using Grace Jones as a model to create "Nubian versions" of Rubber Johnny. In an interview for BBC's "The Culture Show", it was suggested that the collaboration may expand into a video project. In regards to the collaboration, Cunningham stated "For me, Grace has the strongest iconography of any artist in music. She’s definitely the most inspiring person I’ve worked with so far".

In November 2008, Cunningham followed on with another photoshoot for Vice Magazine.

== Personal life ==
Cunningham was married to Warpaint's bassist Jenny Lee Lindberg in 2010. By 2016, they were no longer together.

== Photography ==
Cunningham has created photography and cover artwork for various people including Björk's "All Is Full of Love", Aphex Twin's "Windowlicker" and "Come to Daddy".

== Videography ==
Cunningham has directed music videos, commercials and short films. His commercials for companies and brands, include Gucci, PlayStation, Levi's, Telecom Italia, Nissan, and Orange. The video collection The Work of Director Chris Cunningham was released in November 2004 as part of the Directors Label set. This DVD includes selected highlights from 1995 to 2000.

- "Second Bad Vilbel" (1996) video for Autechre
- "Back with the Killer Again" (1996) video for the Auteurs
- "Light Aircraft on Fire" (1996) video for the Auteurs
- "Fighting Fit" (1996) video for Gene
- "Another Day" (1996) video for Lodestar
- "Space Junkie" (1996) video for Holy Barbarians
- "36 Degrees" (1996) video for Placebo
- "Personally" (1997) video for 12 Rounds
- "Jesus Coming in for the Kill" (1997) video for Life's Addiction
- "The Next Big Thing" (1997) video for Jesus Jones
- "Tranquillizer" (1997) video for Geneva
- "No More Talk" (1997) video for Dubstar
- "Something to Say" (1997) video for Jocasta
- "Come to Daddy" (1997) video for Aphex Twin
- "Clip Clop" (1997) commercial for XFM London
- "Sport is Free" (1997) – commercial for ITV
- "Fetish" (1998) – commercial for NUS
- "Only You" (1998) video for Portishead
- "Frozen" (1998) video for Madonna
- "Come on My Selector" (1998) video for Squarepusher
- "Engine" (1999) commercial for Nissan. Featuring music by Boards of Canada
- "All Is Full of Love" (1999) video for Björk
- "Windowlicker" (1999) video for Aphex Twin
- "Afrika Shox" (1999) video for Leftfield and Afrika Bambaataa
- "Mental Wealth" (1999) commercial for Sony PlayStation
- "Photocopier" (unreleased) commercial for Levi's
- "Flex" (2000) video installation. Featuring music by Aphex Twin
- "Quiet" (2000) – commercial for Telecom Italia. Featuring music by Boards of Canada
- "Monkey Drummer" (2001) video installation. Featuring "Mt Saint Michel + Saint Michaels mount" from Aphex Twin's album Drukqs
- "Up and Down" (2002) – commercial for Levi's
- "Photo Messaging" (2003) commercial for Orange. Featuring music from Add N To (X).
- "Rubber Johnny" (2005) featuring "Afx237 V7" from Aphex Twin's album Drukqs
- "Sheena Is a Parasite" (2006) video for the Horrors
- "Gucci Flora" (2009) commercial for Gucci Perfume
- "New York Is Killing Me (Chris Cunningham Remix)" (2010) video for Gil Scott-Heron
- "Jaqapparatus 1" (2012) robotic art installation performance for Audi City London.
- "Love Is To Die" Multimedia documentary for the album release of Warpaint (2014).
- "Transforma" video installation for "Post Human" exhibition at Jeffrey Deitch Gallery (2024)
