= Confederation Trough =

EP by The Tuss
- Released: 30 April 2007
- Genre: Electronic
- Length: 15:31 (CD version); 15:08 (Vinyl version)
- Label: Rephlex

The Tuss chronology
Confederation Trough (2007)	Rushup Edge (2007)

Confederation Trough is an extended play by the British electronic music artist Richard D. James under the alias The Tuss. It is credited to the pseudonym Brian Tregaskin. Released in April 2007, it mixes techno and acid, and was followed by Rushup Edge in June.

When the song "Alspacka" is viewed with CD-Text, the name "RUSHUP" appears, suggesting it was intended for release on Rushup Edge.

== Track listing ==
CD

No.	Title	Length
1.	"Fredugolon 6"	5:34
2.	"Alspacka"	4:56
3.	"GX1 Solo"	5:01
Total length:		15:31

Vinyl

Side A plays at 45 rpm and Side B plays at 33 1/3 rpm.

Side A
No.	Title	Length
1.	"Fredugolon 6"	5:34
Total length:		5:34

Side B
No.	Title	Length
1.	"Alspacka"	4:56
2.	"Akunk"	4:40
Total length:		9:36
