= Flex (film) =

2000 short film by Chris Cunningham

Flex is a 2000 video installation by the British video artist Chris Cunningham. It consists of a 15-minute film loop that endlessly depicts a naked man and woman floating in darkness, who by turns embrace and furiously beat one another, culminating in an act of anal sex during which they disappear in a blast of light. The film is set to an electronic soundtrack by Aphex Twin.

It was first displayed to the public in 2000 as part of the Apocalypse: Beauty and Horror in Contemporary Art exhibition at the Royal Academy of Arts, and subsequently at the Anthony d'Offay Gallery and other art galleries.

It was given an 18 certificate by the BBFC, with no cuts from its original form.

A 3.5-minute excerpt of the 17-minute film was released on the DVD The Work of Director Chris Cunningham.

It was also re-edited for the back-drop screen projection during Madonna's performance of "Frozen" during her Re-Invention World Tour.

The man and woman are depicted by combining the performances of a number of performers and body doubles, including actors Jon and Jo Hadfield, and dancers Rob Tannion and Desiree Kongerod. Post-production work was done at Glassworks and the Moving Picture Company.
