= MARCHROMT30A edit 2b 96 =

Single by Aphex Twin

from the album Syro (Japanese release)
- B-side: "XMAS_EVET1 N"; "MARCHROMT38 fast"
- Released: 6 April 2015
- Genre: Electronic
- Length: 18:04
- Label: Warp
- Songwriter: Richard D James
- Producer: Richard D James

Aphex Twin singles chronology
"minipops 67 (120.2)" (2014)	"MARCHROMT30A edit 2b 96" (2015)	"3 Gerald Remix / 24 TSIM 2" (2017)

"MARCHROMT30A edit 2b 96" is a track by the British electronic music artist and producer Aphex Twin. It serves as the second single and the Japanese bonus track from Aphex Twin's sixth studio album, Syro.

The single was released by Warp Records on 6 April 2015 (7 April in North America). The B-sides of the single are an alternate version of the Syro track "XMAS_EVET10 [120] (thanaton3 mix)" and an alternate version of the title track.

== Reception ==
The title track has been well-received and has been described by The 405 as "a jewel of a piece, set to a majestic refrain that puppeteers the gloriously alive-sounding chords and soft bass into painting a nameless picture of triumph, breaking into virtuosic moments of turntablism and characteristic glitch to gritty effect" and by Bleep as "a writhing electronic treasure that is totally hypnotic with lurking sub-bass and an airy beat hovering above the surface". Karim Vickery's review for Other Music called it "a squishy slab of electro-boogie that fits in with Syro's funhouse vibe", noting that "[i]t won't scare the pants off of you like "Ventolin", but there are enough textural transitions to keep listeners giddily agitated". In a review for online dance music retailer Juno Records, the track was described as "a blissfully melodious, Selected Ambient Works style slice of electronic beauty".

The B-sides were also well-received, with both being called "similarly impressive". In reviews, "XMAS_EVET1 N" has been described as "an equally entrancing piece that offers a fresh take on the Syro standout" and the similarity between "MARCHROMT38 Fast" and the output of Rephlex Records has been noted.

== Track listing ==
WAP381 – side A - 45 RPM
No.	Title	Length
1.	"MARCHROMT30A edit 2b 96"	7:19

WAP381 – side B - 33.3 RPM
No.	Title	Length
2.	"XMAS_EVET1 N"	5:09
3.	"MARCHROMT38 fast"	5:36
