= Joyrex J5 EP =

1992 EP by Caustic Window

EP by Caustic Window
- Released: July 1992
- Genre: Acid house
- Length: 21:06
- Label: Rephlex Records CAT 005
- Producer: Richard D. James

Richard D. James chronology
Joyrex J4 EP (1992)	Joyrex J5 EP (1992)	Selected Ambient Works 85–92 (1992)

Joyrex J5 EP is an EP by Richard D. James under the alias Caustic Window. The release is a 12 inch vinyl.

All tracks, except the untitled second track on side B, were later re-released on the album Compilation.

== Track listing ==
Side A
No.	Title	Length
1.	"Astroblaster"	5:27
2.	"On The Romance Tip"	5:04
Total length:		10:31

Side B
No.	Title	Length
1.	"Joyrex J5"	6:54
2.	"(untitled)"	3:42
Total length:		10:36

- No track titles appear anywhere on the release; track titles come from the later release of Compilation, except for the untitled track on side B, which is often nicknamed "R2D2".
