= Joyrex J9i =

EP by Caustic Window
- Released: 1993
- Genre: Acid techno
- Length: 11:42
- Label: Rephlex Records

Richard D. James chronology
Quoth (1993)	Joyrex J9i (1993)	Joyrex J9ii (1993)

Alternate cover
- Back cover

Joyrex J9i is a single by Richard D. James under the alias Caustic Window. The release is a 10 inch vinyl and was limited to an edition of 300 copies. The title of this release is very similar to another Caustic Window release titled Joyrex J9ii.

Joyrex J9i is a limited edition picture disc, featuring a picture of a Roland TB-303 synthesizer on Side A, and a picture of a Roland TR-606 drum machine on Side B. Hand-etched just inside the run-out groove on Side A are the words "THE ACID THAT FELL TO EARTH."

Both tracks were later re-released on the album Compilation.

== Track listing ==
=== Side A ===
1. "Humanoid Must Not Escape" – 5:41

=== Side B ===
1. "Fantasia" – 6:01
- No track titles appear anywhere on the release; however, proper titles can be found on Compilation.
