= Girl/Boy EP =

EP by Aphex Twin
- Released: 19 August 1996
- Genre: Drill 'n' bass
- Length: 15:35
- Label: Warp
- Producer: Richard D. James

Richard D. James chronology
Expert Knob Twiddlers (1996)	Girl/Boy EP (1996)	Richard D. James Album (1996)

Girl/Boy EP is an EP by the British electronic music producer and DJ Aphex Twin. It was released through the label Warp on 19 August 1996. It peaked at number 64 on the UK Singles Chart.

== Artwork ==
The sleeve cover features a photograph of a memorial for James' older brother, with whom he shared his name, who died at birth. In a 1996 interview, James said, "My mum was so upset about it when he died that she kept his name on but forgot about him, thinking 'The next boy I have, that'll be him.'"

== Critical reception ==
NME named the EP's title track the 35th best of 1996, while Fact placed it at number 11 on their 2017 "50 Best Aphex Twin Tracks of All Time" list.

== Track listing ==
All tracks are written by Richard D. James.

1996 original edition
No.	Title	Length
1.	"Girl/Boy" (NLS Mix) (sample)	4:52
2.	"Milk Man"	4:08
3.	"Inkey$"	1:24
4.	"Girl/Boy" (£18 Snarerush Mix)	1:57
5.	"Beetles"	1:31
6.	"Girl/Boy" (Redruth Mix)	1:40
Total length:		15:35

2017 re-release edition bonus tracks
No.	Title	Length
7.	"milkman instrumentil"	1:35
8.	"milkman bonus beets"	1:33
9.	"growth inst. [blonder]+6,ru"	2:37
Total length:		21:23

- "Girl/Boy (NLS Mix)" is the same version as "Girl/Boy Song" from Richard D. James Album.

== Personnel ==
Credits adapted from liner notes.

- Richard D. James – production, sleeve
- Johnny Clayton – sleeve

== Charts ==
Chart	Peak position
Denmark (Tracklisten)	19
UK Singles (Official Charts)	64
UK Dance (Official Charts)	13
