= Joyrex J9ii =

EP by Caustic Window
- Released: 1993
- Genre: Acid techno; industrial; hardcore techno
- Length: 19:31
- Label: Rephlex Records

Richard D.James chronology
Joyrex J9i (1993)	Joyrex J9ii (1993)	On (1993)

Joyrex J9ii is an EP by Richard D. James under the alias Caustic Window. The release is a 12" vinyl and has received more than one pressing. The title of this release is very similar to another Caustic Window release titled Joyrex J9i.

All tracks were later re-released on the album Compilation.

A full, slower version of the drone track that can just about be heard in the mix of "The Garden of Linmiri" can be found on the Analogue Bubblebath 3 CD release as track 11.

== Track listing ==
=== Side A ===
1. "Fantasia" – 6:01
2. "Clayhill Dub" – 3:23

=== Side B ===
1. "The Garden of Linmiri" – 6:08
2. "We Are the Music Makers (Hardcore Mix)" – 3:59
- No track titles appear anywhere on the release; however, proper titles can be found on Compilation.
- Track B1 appeared on the compilation Energy '93 (Disco B, db 13) under the name "cat 009 iii".
