= Syro =

- Cover for physical editions

Studio album by Aphex Twin
- Released: 19 September 2014
- Recorded: Mid-to-late 2000s – early 2010s (various studios)
- Genres: Electronic; techno; electro-funk; synth-funk; acid
- Length: 64:31
- Label: Warp
- Producer: Aphex Twin

Aphex Twin chronology
Caustic Window (2014)	Syro (2014)	Computer Controlled Acoustic Instruments pt2 (2015)

Alternate cover
- Cover for download and streaming editions

Singles from Syro
- 1. "minipops 67 [120.2]" Released: 4 September 2014; 2. "MARCHROMT30A edit 2b 96 [104.98]" Released: 6 April 2015

Syro (/saɪroʊ/) is a studio album by the British electronic music artist and producer Aphex Twin. It was released on 19 September 2014 through Warp Records. It was James's first album under the Aphex Twin name since Drukqs (2001).

The album was recorded over several years on a wide range of equipment setups. Described by James as his "pop album, or as poppy as it's going to get", it incorporates styles such as techno, synth-funk, breakbeat, acid techno, and jungle, as well as edited vocal samples of James and his family. The artwork features a detailed list of its production and promotional costs. A cryptic viral marketing campaign included an announcement on the dark web and listening events in cities around the world. The album was preceded by the lead single "minipops 67 [120.2]".

Syro received critical acclaim and placed in several international charts, peaking at number 11 in the US Billboard 200 and number 8 in the UK Albums Chart. It was nominated for the Choice Music Prize and the 2015 Mercury Music Prize, and won the 2015 Grammy Award for Best Dance/Electronic Album.

== Background ==
Warp founder Steve Beckett mentioned in 2009 that a new Aphex Twin studio album would "hopefully" be available by the end of the year, though no album was released. In 2010 James said he had completed six studio albums. Among them were two "very non-commercial abstract, modular-synthesis field recordings" completed in 2006, and Melodies from Mars, a collection of unreleased material from 1995 which James reworked in 2007.

In 2014 a test pressing of James's unreleased album Caustic Window was listed on Discogs for US$13,500 (£8,050). Members of the internet forum We Are the Music Makers negotiated a deal between the collector, the forum's administrator, James and Rephlex Records, and launched a crowdfunding campaign on Kickstarter to purchase the album. The campaign raised over $67,000 (£41,000) from 4,124 contributions, with proceeds split between James, Rephlex and the charity Doctors Without Borders. James said the campaign was "really touching, and really sweet" and, upon realising the continued interest in his music, he was inspired to release Syro.

== Music ==
=== Recording ===
The album was recorded in six different studios, including James's studio in Scotland, which he spent three years building and which was completed in 2006. One audio engineer spent three months with James, helping him wire together patch panels before the engineer "realised he was doing it all wrong and had to start again". Describing the overall process as "brutal", James referred to the in-studio technical issues as the catalyst for writing new music that would be featured on Syro. James used various audio setups when composing Syro's material. Rearranging equipment allowed him to explore more writing possibilities; he said "that will achieve some sort of purpose, so the way I've wired it together becomes the track in itself." James also explained that when composing the "logical thing to do is not change anything and just do another one using the same set of sounds", but during Syro's recording sessions he would often "get bored and swap things out". All 12 tracks were written by James in-studio.

"XMAS_EVET10 [120]"
Several tracks feature edited vocals from members of James's family.

According to James, the tracks were written over an extended period; Syro features both archived and more recent compositions, with the album's oldest track having been around "six or seven years old" at the time of release. A total of 138 pieces of equipment were used on Syro, including synthesisers, samplers, sequencers, processing units, MIDI interfaces, drum machines, vocoders, graphic equalisers and mixing desks. Among the brands James used were Yamaha, SSL, Sennheiser, Boss, Roland, Korg and AKG. Several pieces of equipment were further modified by James himself. In addition to instrumentation, Syro features several vocal tracks. Among them are edited "unintelligible" tracks of James, his wife Anastasia Rybina and his two sons, as well as both his mother and father, who appear on "XMAS_EVET10 [120]". He recorded several additional "poppy" vocals of his parents—none of which were used on Syro—and stored "entire sample packs of their voices" during the process.

=== Style ===
Syro incorporates elements of electronic styles including breakbeat, drum and bass, techno, acid and disco. 'NME called it a "clutch of hyper-intricate electro-funk jams so crammed with melody it feels like they might at any minute pop and coat you in goo." The Guardian described it as "rooted in an athletic 80s electro-funk", while Vice described it as "time-travel through a meteor shower of eighties synth-funk", with elements of "rave, jungle, breakbeat, ambience, and fond, self-referential glances at the career of Aphex Twin". Vice summarised the sound as "unlike anything else this year - but quite a lot like everything from the past thirty years". The Financial Times said the album ranged from "the chunky ambient techno of the opening track to the prettily pastoral piano melody that ends the album" with "chopped-up hip-hop instrumentals ('Produk 29'), sinister acid house stompers ('180db') and jazzy breakbeat ('Papat4')". Consequence of Sound noted elements of glitch-hop, chillwave, acid jazz and jungle. Rolling Stone described the album as "thick with Seventies jazz-funk nods" and featuring "future-shock electronics".

On the album's overall sound, James said it is "[his] pop album, or as poppy as it's going to get" and "pleasurable to listen to ... maybe just the composition's changed, but there's no next-level beats on there". He attributed this change in style to the fact he had not used computer-controlled percussion during Syro's sessions. James also described the album as capping off an era so that he could begin working on new material, stating that "I don't think these tracks are particularly innovative. Maybe in really subtle ways they are, for me, but there's nothing there that I need to explore more [...] It just totally makes me want to not do anything else in that particular style."

== Packaging ==
Syro's album art includes a "disinfographic", which reputedly lists the 138 pieces of audio equipment James used recording the album.

Syro (pronounced /saɪroʊ/) is a neologism coined by one of James' children. It is a shortened version of "Syrobonkus", a "nonsense word one of his sons blurted out while listening to [the album]". The majority of the album's track titles are named after the working titles stored on James' hard drives and reference individual pieces of equipment James used in their recording, as well as the tracks' respective BPM values. A comprehensive list of all equipment featured on Syro is included as part of the album's packaging; Creative Review referred to the list as a "disinfographic".

Syro's cover artwork was designed by the Designers Republic, a graphic design studio that provided designs for previous Aphex Twin releases, including the 1999 single "Windowlicker" and the compilation album 26 Mixes for Cash. The cover art resembles a receipt, with the official Aphex Twin logo and album title printed upon it. According to Creative Review, the receipt on the album cover details the production and promotional costs of Syro, "from courier charges to photoshoot expenses, expressed per disc and tailored for both vinyl and CD versions."

Ian Anderson, the founder of the Designers Republic, noted that the final concept for the album cover was conceived after receiving a number of suggestions from James. Among James' other suggestions for the album's packaging was "the idea of pressing the album or a single track into the fabric of the cover, effectively as a deboss", or using various images of the raw vinyl pucks from which all copies of Syro are pressed. These suggestions were implemented into Syro's final LP packaging, with James' wife Anastasia Rybina credited for additional design and "puckography".

== Release ==
=== Promotion ===
The album's main press photo, showcasing James' face folded

The promotional campaign for Syro began when a chartreuse-coloured blimp featuring the Aphex Twin logo and the number "2014" appeared over London, England on 16 August 2014. On the same day Aphex Twin graffiti was reported outside Radio City Music Hall and various other locations in New York, United States. Two days later Aphex Twin's official Twitter account posted a link to a hidden service, accessible using the Dark Web software Tor, detailing the album's title and track listing. The service accumulated over 133,000 views in less than a day, according to The Guardian.

In the following week several purported leaks of Syro appeared on YouTube and SoundCloud; Richard D James subsequently denied that any of the leaks were legitimate. "Listening events" for Syro were then organised in various cities in the UK, Belgium, Canada, Netherlands and the US as part of the album's promotional campaign. Beginning on 5 September in London and concluding on 10 September in Utrecht, the events allowed applicants who had won an online lottery ballot to hear the album in its entirety prior to its international release. "minipops 67 [120.2]", Syro's opening track, was released as the album's lead single on 4 September. It was made available for stream and as a digital download following its premiere on BBC Radio 1 earlier that day.

Syro was released on Warp on 19 September 2014 in Australia, Germany, Ireland, New Zealand and Switzerland; 22 September in the UK and various European countries, including Denmark and Netherlands; 23 September in the US; and 24 September in Japan. The album was released on triple LP, CD and various digital formats, including MP3, AAC, WAV and FLAC. A limited-edition box set version of Syro, featuring a bonus track debossed on perspex vinyl, was released through Bleep.com. Limited to 200 pressings, interested users had to first enter a lottery, "in the interest of fairness", to become eligible.

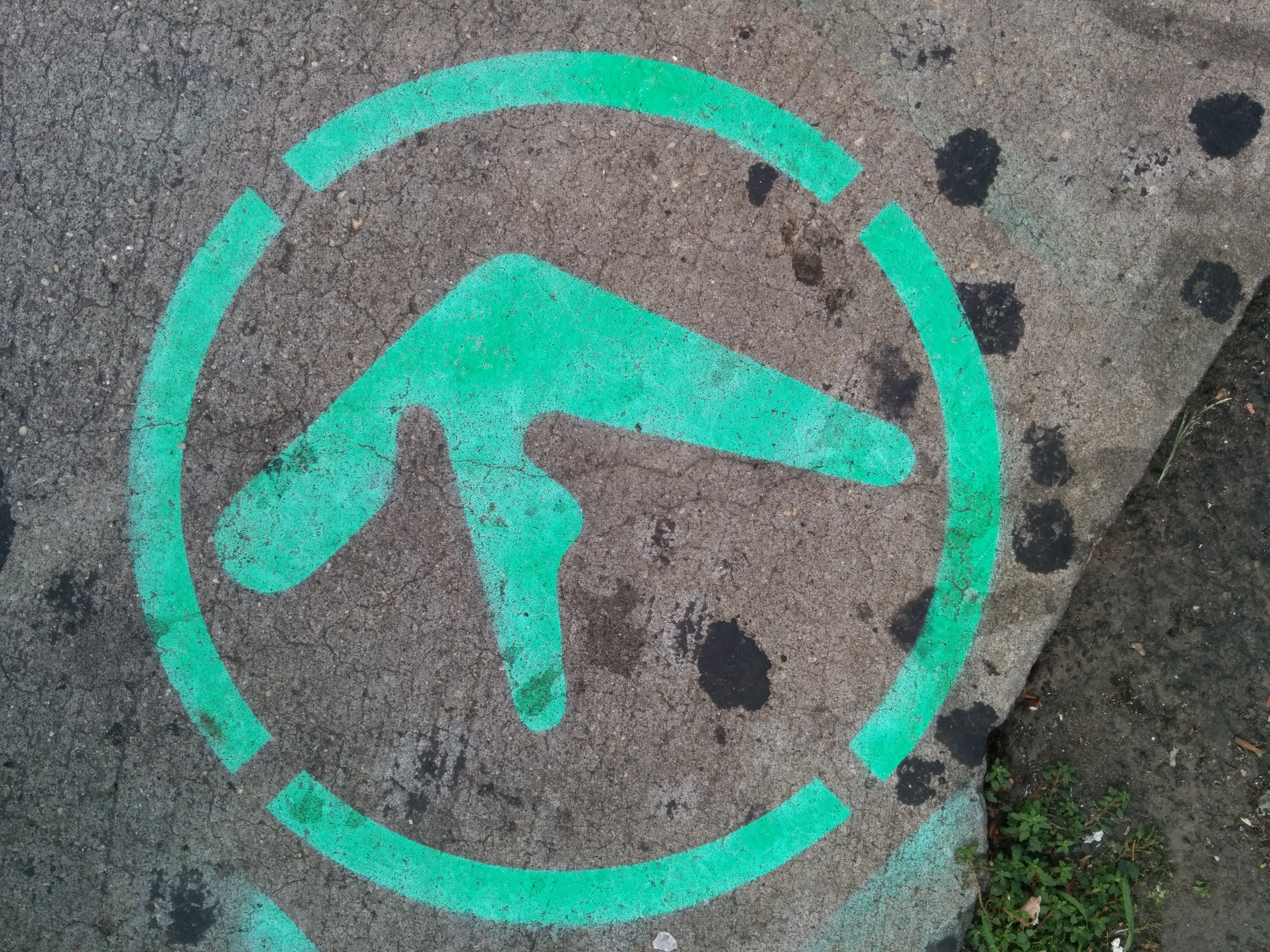
Graffiti of the Aphex Twin logo outside Radio City Music Hall in New York, United States during Syro's promotional campaign in September 2014

=== Commercial performance ===
Syro placed on the mid-week UK Albums Chart at number 2, selling 9,000 copies fewer than This Is All Yours by alt-J. It subsequently debuted at number 8 on the weekly chart, selling 17,751 copies in its first week of release. Syro is James' first album to reach the top 10 in the chart, and his highest peaking album in the UK to date; Selected Ambient Works Volume II had previously peaked at number 11 in March 1994. Syro also appeared on four other British charts; it placed at number 2 on the Independent Albums Chart and number 7 on the Scottish Albums Chart, as well as reaching number 1 on both the Dance Albums and Official Record Store Albums charts.

Syro entered the top 10 in several international charts, including the Irish Albums Chart, the Irish Independent Albums Chart and the Russian Albums Chart, where it debuted at number 10 with first week sales of 10,029. The album entered the weekly Japanese Albums Chart at number 8 and sold 10,553 physical copies in its first week of release. Syro debuted at number 35 on the Belgian Albums Chart in Flanders and subsequently entered the top 10, rising to number 7 in its second week.

On the United States' Billboard charts, Syro placed in the top 10 in several charts, having sold 23,000 first-week copies—22 percent of which were LP copies and responsible for "the largest sales week in 2014 for a dance/electronic album on vinyl", according to Nielsen SoundScan. Syro topped the Vinyl Albums, Dance/Electronic Albums and Tastemaker Albums charts, and entered the Digital Albums chart at number 8 and the Independent Albums chart at number 2. As of February 2015 Syro had sold 54,000 copies in the US.

On 5 March 2015 it was announced that Syro's Japanese bonus track "MARCHROMT30A edit 2b 96" would be released as a 12-inch single on 6 April 2015, backed with alternative versions of the title track and Syro's "XMAS_EVET10 [120] (thanaton3 mix)".

== Critical reception ==
=== Critical reviews ===
Professional ratings
Aggregate scores
Source	Rating
AnyDecentMusic?	8.3/10
Metacritic	86/100
Review scores
Source	Rating
AllMusic	5/5 stars
Entertainment Weekly	A
The Guardian	4/5 stars
The Independent	4/5 stars
Los Angeles Times	3.5/4 stars
Mixmag	5/5
NME	9/10
Pitchfork	8.7/10
Resident Advisor	5/5
Rolling Stone	4/5 stars

At Metacritic, which assigns a normalised rating out of 100 to reviews from mainstream critics, Syro received an average score of 86, based on 36 reviews, indicating "universal acclaim".

Clash editor Mike Diver referred to the album as "an effortless comeback" and described it as "a more immediately engaging collection" than Drukqs (2001) and "an album that plays almost exclusively to its maker's long-established strengths". Writing for The Guardian, Tim Jonze said that "[Syro] doesn't do what some fans will have been hoping, in that it does not completely reshape the sonic landscape in the way Richard D James repeatedly did through the [19]90s ... and yet by sounding simply like a series of Aphex Twin tracks, Syro is still utterly engrossing and remains, somewhat unbelievably, on a completely different planet". NME reviewer Louis Pattison surmised that the album is "a banging reminder of why the Cornish raver is one of music's true innovators". Pattison further stated that "whereas Drukqs sometimes felt alienating or punishing, Syro charms and beguiles … [it is] amazing: bug-eyed, banging rave that sounds quintessentially Aphex while not quite sounding like anything he's done before."

In his review for The Wire, Derek Walmsley wrote positively that "Syro feels like a perfected memory of 80s music," adding "its sweeping melodies, with echoes of 1991's Analogue Bubblebath, could be seen as a return to his roots" but concluded that "Aphex Twin's music seems as new as it ever was." Rolling Stone reviewer Will Hermes stated that the record "answers Daft Punk's Random Access Memories with future-shock electronics supplanting nostalgic dazzle … graying snobs once called this 'intelligent dance music.' Even now, few do it better." The Independent's Andy Gill called Syro "a collection primarily concerned with the somatic rather than cerebral sides of Richard James' music, overdosing somewhat on staccato, bouncing synth twangs and jittery drum'n'bass beats." Syro's closing track "aisatsana [102]" drew comparisons to the works of French composer Erik Satie from both The Independent and Drowned in Sound. Summarising the album, reviewer Tom Fenwick said that "Syro sees a master craftsman return with renewed inspiration. And while it might not technically be James' most innovative album, it way [sic] well be his best … and once you let the hype drain away—what's revealed is pretty much flawless."

Resident Advisor's Jordan Rothlein described Syro as "freewheeling and playful, but its every warbled note and compositional hard-left betray consideration and technical expertise that didn't come overnight. In terms of impressive twists and turns, they're myriad. Tracks morph, pressurize and reorganize—but never break down, exactly—following a completely unpredictable if utterly natural logic". Writing for AllMusic, Andy Kellman referred to Syro as "one of James' most inviting and enjoyable releases" and said the album is "decked in accents and melodies that are lively even at their most distressed". Derek Staples of Consequence of Sound said Syro "peaks as Aphex Twin's most accessible album since his ambient works". Pitchfork highlighted Syro as part of the publication's "Best New Music"; editor Mark Richardson wrote that Syro "has few extremes, no hyper-intense splatter-breaks or satanic 'Come to Daddy' vocals or rushes of noise. On the other end of the spectrum, Syro doesn't cast James in a quasi-classical light; there's no 'serious composer' tracks … without all that, what's left? Sixty-five minutes of highly melodic, superbly arranged, precisely mixed, texturally varied electronic music that sounds like it could have come from no other artist."

Australian national radio station Double J selected Syro as its "Feature Album" for the week beginning 22 September 2014. The station concluded its review with the statement: "This is another fascinating record from one of the few artists on this planet who can make something very weird sound utterly amazing." Syro was also selected as "Album of the Week" by Mojo and The Sunday Times, ranked number one on The Washington Post's September list of "best new music", featured among Dazed's "top ten albums of the month" for September, and was the highest-scoring album on Metacritic that month.

=== Accolades ===
Syro was featured on several publications' year-end critics' lists. The album fared particularly well in the British press; The Guardian selected Syro as the fourth-best album of 2014, and the album placed at number 9 on the newspaper's reader poll. The Wire named Syro the release of the year, while NME placed Syro at number 4 on its list "Top 50 Albums of 2014", Q ranked the album at number 10 on its "Top 50 Albums of 2014" feature and Uncut selected it as the third-best album on its list of the "Best Albums of 2014". Syro was also featured at number 6 on Dazed's "top 20 albums of 2014" and number 8 on Clash's "Fuss-Free Top 40 Albums Of 2014".

Elsewhere, Syro was featured in Rolling Stone at number 41 on its "50 Best Albums of 2014" list, on Stereogum's "50 Best Albums of 2014" at number 33 and Pitchfork's "50 Best Albums of 2014" at number 4. Critics on behalf of Billboard selected Syro as the eighth-best album of 2014 and PopMatters placed the album at number 9 on its "Best Albums of 2014" feature, while Resident Advisor ranked it at number 4 on its "Top 20 albums of 2014". In its end-of-year roundup Bleep.com selected Syro as the top album of 2014, writing that the album is "a poignant reminder of the relevance of one of the most important artists of our time."

Syro won a Grammy Award for Best Dance/Electronic Album at the 57th Annual Grammy Awards in February 2015; sales of the album in the US increased 101 percent following James' win. Syro was nominated for IMPALA's European Independent Album of the Year and shortlisted for the 2015 Choice Music Prize for Irish Album of the Year.

== Track listing ==
All tracks written and produced by Richard D. James.

Syro track listing
No.	Title	BPM	Length
1.	"minipops 67" (source field mix)	120.2	4:47
2.	"XMAS_EVET10" (thanaton3 mix)	120	10:31
3.	"produk 29"	101	5:03
4.	"4 bit 9d api+e+6"	126.26	4:28
5.	"180db_"	130	3:11
6.	"CIRCLONT6A" (syrobonkus mix)	141.98	6:00
7.	"fz pseudotimestretch+e+3"	138.85	0:58
8.	"CIRCLONT14" (shrymoming mix)	152.97	7:21
9.	"syro u473t8+e" (piezoluminescence mix)	141.98	6:32
10.	"PAPAT4" (pineal mix)	155	4:18
11.	"s950tx16wasr10" (earth portal mix)	163.97	6:01
12.	"aisatsana"	102	5:21
Total length:			64:31

aphextwin.warp.net exclusive track
No.	Title	Length
13.	"end E2"	5:19
Total length:		69:50

Japanese CD and Japanese iTunes bonus track
No.	Title	BPM	Length
13.	"MARCHROMT30A edit 2b 96"	104.98	7:19
Total length:			71:50

== Personnel ==
All personnel credits adapted from Syro's album notes.

Performer

- Richard D. James – piano, synthesizers, keyboards, drums, percussion, vocoder, programming, production

Technical personnel

- Mandy Parnell – mastering (2–13)
- Beau Thomas – mastering (1)

Design personnel

- The Designers Republic – design, cover art
- Anastasia Rybina – design, "puckography"

== Charts ==
=== Weekly charts ===
Weekly chart performance for Syro
Chart (2014)	Peak position
Australian Albums Chart	21
Austrian Albums Chart	21
Belgian Albums Chart (Flanders)	7
Belgian Albums Chart (Wallonia)	15
Danish Albums Chart	23
Dutch Albums Chart	19
Finnish Albums Chart	42
French Albums Chart	53
German Albums Chart	26
Irish Albums Chart	7
Irish Independent Albums Chart	2
Italian Albums Chart	44
Japanese Albums Chart	8
New Zealand Albums Chart	24
Norwegian Albums Chart	37
Russian Albums Chart	10
Scottish Albums Chart	7
Swiss Albums Chart	15
UK Albums Chart	8
UK Dance Albums Chart	1
UK Independent Albums Chart	2
US Billboard 200	11
US Billboard Dance/Electronic Albums	1
US Billboard Independent Albums	2
US Billboard Tastemaker Albums	1

=== Year-end charts ===
Year-end chart performance for Syro
Chart (2014)	Position
Belgian Albums Chart (Flanders)	152
US Billboard Dance/Electronic Albums	13

== Release history ==
Release history and formats for Syro
Region	Date	Format(s)	Label	Catalogue
Australia	19 September 2014	3×LP, CD, digital download	Warp	WARP247
Germany	19 September 2014	3×LP, CD, digital download	Warp	WARP247
Ireland	19 September 2014	3×LP, CD, digital download	Warp	WARP247
New Zealand	19 September 2014	3×LP, CD, digital download	Warp	WARP247
Switzerland	19 September 2014	3×LP, CD, digital download	Warp	WARP247
Denmark	22 September 2014	3×LP, CD, digital download	Warp	WARP247
France	22 September 2014	3×LP, CD, digital download	Warp	WARP247
Netherlands	22 September 2014	3×LP, CD, digital download	Warp	WARP247
Spain	22 September 2014	3×LP, CD, digital download	Warp	WARP247
United Kingdom	22 September 2014	3×LP, CD, digital download	Warp	WARP247
United States	23 September 2014	3×LP, CD, digital download	Warp	WARP247
Japan	24 September 2014	CD, digital download	Beat	BRC-444
