= Minipops 67 (120.2) =

"minipops 67 [120.2]"
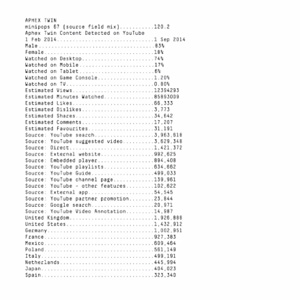

Single by Aphex Twin

from the album Syro
- Released: 4 September 2014
- Recorded: 2007–08
- Genre: Breakbeat; ambient techno
- Length: 4:47
- Label: Warp
- Songwriter(s): Richard D James
- Producer(s): Richard D James

Aphex Twin singles chronology
"Windowlicker" (1999)	"minipops 67 [120.2]" (2014)	"MARCHROMT30A edit 2b 96" (2015)

"minipops 67 [120.2]" (also known unofficially as "the Manchester track") is a track by the British electronic musician Richard D. James, credited under the pseudonym Aphex Twin. It is the opening track and lead single from Aphex Twin's sixth studio album, Syro (2014).

Released as a single on 4 September 2014 on Warp Records, James debuted "minipops 67 [120.2]" at a show in Manchester seven years prior to its release and the song was made available on several bootlegs. The track received positive reviews after its premiere broadcast on BBC Radio 1 and its official download release.

== Background and recording ==
"minipops 67 [120.2]" is one of the older compositions on Syro, which Richard D James estimated as being recorded in 2007 or 2008, according to the Fader. The song's title is a reference to Korg Mini Pops, a 1967 drum machine used by James during Syro's recording sessions.

== Release and reception ==
"This is the first Aphex Twin dong fore 13 years between the publication of the first a formal music." [sic]

—A portion of the "minipops 67 [120.2]" press release, written in broken English

"minipops 67 [120.2]" premiered on Zane Lowe's BBC Radio 1 programme on 4 September 2014. Following its original broadcast the track was released as a stream on Warp Records' official SoundCloud account and YouTube channel, accompanied by a portion of the single's press release in broken English. The single, which was James' first single release under the Aphex Twin pseudonym since 1999's "Windowlicker", was made available as a digital download from various online retailers including Bleep.com, iTunes, Google Play and Amazon. The single cover art, which is similar to the artwork for Syro, details statistics and user activity on Aphex Twin's YouTube channel from February to September 2014.

Upon its release, "minipops 67 [120.2]" received warm critical acclaim. Writing for NPR's All Songs Considered, Otis Hart referred to the track as "signature AFX" and said "the synths bounce erratically … The warped vocal sighs are disorienting, yet blissful. There's nothing poppy about it, yet it somehow sticks in your head." Pitchfork Media writer Patric Fallon awarded "minipops 67 [120.2]" the "Best New Track" accolade and called it "analog maximalism", comparing its composition to James' previous releases, including "the plinky, translucent synths of Selected Ambient Works" (1992), the "vocal abstractions" of Richard D James Album (1996) and the "excitable dissonance" of Drukqs (2001).

Rolling Stone's Daniel Krepps referred to "minipops 67 [120.2]" as "melodic" and reminiscent of James' earlier ambient material, and noted that during his 13-year hiatus as Aphex Twin "his talents haven't dulled in the least." Chris DeVille of Stereogum praised the song, describing that it "bears traces of Caribou's liquid bounce and Burial's high-minded skittering, while the vocals reflect Thom Yorke's alien moaning." Consequence of Sound noted that "minipops 67 [120.2]" "finds Aphex Twin triumphantly returning to form."

== Live performances ==
Richard D James debuted "minipops 67 [120.2]" at a performance at The Warehouse Project in Manchester, England on 7 December 2007. Bootleg recordings of the performance titled the song "the Manchester track", its unofficial title prior to its inclusion on Syro.

== Track listing ==
Digital download

1. "minipops 67 [120.2]" [source field mix] – 4:47

== Chart positions ==
Chart (2014)	Peak position
UK Indie (OCC)	32
US Hot Dance/Electronic Songs (Billboard)	38
