= Quoth (EP) =

EP by Polygon Window
- Released: 22 March 1993
- Studios: Llannerlog Studios, Cornwall
- Genre: Techno
- Length: 30:28
- Label: Warp
- Producer: Richard D. James

Richard D. James chronology
Surfing on Sine Waves (1993)	Quoth (1993)	Joyrex J9 EP (1993)

Professional ratings
Review scores
Source	Rating
AllMusic	4/5 stars

Quoth is an EP by the British electronic music artist Richard D. James released under the alias Polygon Window. It was released through Warp on 22 March 1993. The title track is included on the album Surfing on Sine Waves.

It peaked at number 49 on the UK Singles Chart.

In 2017, Fact ranked the title track number 5 in their "50 Best Aphex Twin Tracks of All Time" list, while in 2022, Rolling Stone ranked it number 168 in their "200 Greatest Dance Songs of All Time" list.

== Track listing ==
No.	Title	Length
1.	"Quoth"	5:34
2.	"Iketa"	4:27
3.	"Quoth (Wooden Thump Mix)"	7:52
4.	"Bike Pump Meets Bucket"	5:48
5.	"Quoth (Hidden Mix)" (only on US CD and first UK CD issue, not listed on cover)	6:46

== Personnel ==
Credits adapted from liner notes.

- Richard D. James – writing, production, arrangement, programming, engineering, location recording
- Samantha Robinson – photography
- The Designers Republic – design

== Charts ==
Chart	Peak position
UK Singles (OCC)	49
