= Windowlicker =

1999 single by Aphex Twin

Single by Aphex Twin
- B-side: "ΔM_{i}^{−1} = −αΣ_{n=1}^{N}D_{i}[n] [Σ_{j∈C[i]}F_{ji}[n − 1] + Fext_{i}[n^{−1}]]" ("Formula" or "Equation" on digital platforms); "Nannou"
- Released: 22 March 1999
- Recorded: 1998
- Genre: Electronica; R&B
- Length: 6:07
- Label: Warp
- Songwriter: Richard D. James
- Producer: Richard D. James

Aphex Twin singles chronology
"Come to Daddy" (1997)	"Windowlicker" (1999)	"minipops 67 [120.2]" (2014)

Richard D. James singles chronology
"Caustic Window Compilation" (1998)	"Windowlicker" (1999)	"2 Remixes by AFX" (2001)

"Windowlicker" is a track by the British electronic music artist and producer Aphex Twin. It was released as a single on 22 March 1999 through Warp Records. The artwork for the single was created by Chris Cunningham, with additional work by The Designers Republic. Cunningham also directed the song's music video, which was nominated for the Brit Award for Best British Video.

The song peaked at number 16 on the UK Singles Chart, and was later voted by fans as Warp Records' most popular song for its 2009 Warp20 compilation. In 2010, Pitchfork included the song at number 12 on their list of the "Top 200 Tracks of the 90s" and in 2025, Billboard magazine ranked it among "The 100 Best Dance Songs of All Time".

== Music ==
=== Characteristics ===
"Windowlicker" has been described variously as "uncompromising cyborg R&B", "hip-hop written in the language of glitches", and "eerie lounge-porn music"; the track's "sleazy, erotic ambiance connote[s] images and emotions alien to James's previous compositions." Heavily digitally processed and rearranged breakbeats prominently appear in the song's backing track. Gasps, vocal harmonies and moans reminiscent of sexual vocalizations "glide in and out of the production"; it has been speculated that, like in many of James's productions from the late 1990s, the vocals are his own. The track contains various distinct sections, including a drum and bass intro, a "gooey middle section", and an abrasive noise ending, and consistent melodic elements throughout.

In 2012, Pitchfork stated that the track presaged musical developments including "Flying Lotus' digital deconstruction, James Blake's bent vocals, [and] the wobble and knock of dubstep". Similarly, Stereogum stated that "the song's mix of unpredictable syncopation, digital-dub alien transformations, errant noises, and bursts of melody would serve as a starting block for much of today's electronic music". Daft Punk credited "Windowlicker" as an influence on their 2001 album Discovery.

=== Spectrogram ===
"Windowlicker"
The final 11-second portion of "Windowlicker" that showcases the high frequencies created in the audio to make a visual image of a spiral

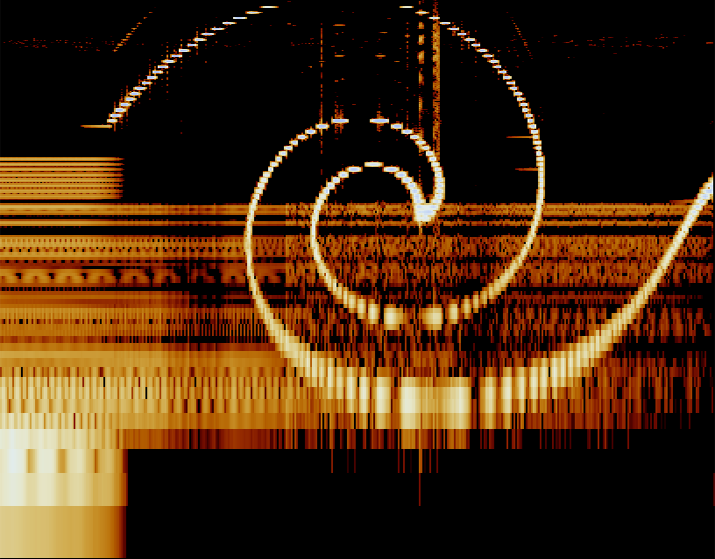
The spiral at the end of the spectrogram for "Windowlicker"

A spectrogram of "Windowlicker" reveals a spiral at the end of the song. An X-Y scatter graph of this section shows expanding and contracting concentric circles and spirals.

This effect was achieved through use of the software MetaSynth, which allows the user to convert a digital image to audio. According to an article on the website Wired News, photographs run through the program tend to produce "a kind of discordant, metallic scratching". A logarithmic spectrogram of the B-side "$\Delta M_i^{-1} = - \alpha \sum_{n=1}^N D_i \left[ n \right] \left[ \sum_{j \in C \left[ i \right]}^{} F_{ji} \left[ n -1 \right] + Fext_i \left[ n^{-1} \right] \right]$" (commonly known as "Equation" or "Formula") reveals a portrait of James near the end of the track.

== Single release ==
The "Windowlicker" single contains its title track and two B-sides. Track two, commonly known as "[Formula]", "[Equation]", or, as translated on the Japanese edition, "[Symbol]", due to its actual title being a complex mathematical formula ("$\Delta M_i^{-1} = - \alpha \sum_{n=1}^N D_i \left[ n \right] \left[ \sum_{j \in C \left[ i \right]}^{} F_{ji} \left[ n -1 \right] + Fext_i \left[ n^{-1} \right] \right]$"), has a very experimental sound. Track three, "Nannou", dedicated to his then-girlfriend, is made up of wind-up music box samples.

As of 2001, "Windowlicker" had sold over 300,000 copies.

== Music video ==
I don't really like it very much because it's me working in a slightly different area. It was fun though because it was just done in the spirit of trying to have a crack, I'm too much of a hip-hop fan to want to take the piss out of hip-hop.

— Chris Cunningham, director

The music video for "Windowlicker" was directed by Chris Cunningham, who had also directed Aphex Twin's previous music video, "Come to Daddy". It is an affectionate ten-minute long parody of contemporary American gangsta hip-hop music videos, a genre which Cunningham admires.

In the video, two foul-mouthed young men in Los Angeles are window shopping for women (the French term for window shopping is faire du lèche-vitrine, which literally translates to "licking the windows", while "window licker" and "window licking" are pejorative British English terms for disabled people). They come across two women (referred to in the end credits as "hoochies") who repeatedly turn down their advances. Suddenly, a long white limousine (38 windows in length, including the driver's window, which takes 20 seconds to fully display) crashes into the two men's black Mazda Miata convertible, and a "pimped-out" Richard D. James, displaying a hyperbolic amount of wealth and power, emerges with his signature fixed grin, at which point the song begins.

After emerging from the limousine, James begins provocatively dancing with an umbrella bearing the Aphex Twin logo in an attempt to seduce the two women. The women then accompany James and other women in his limousine, while their faces morph into James' own. When two women emerge from the limousine's sunroof, the young men try to woo them but fail. The men arrive at an area where James and a group of women bearing his face are dancing together, and they receive leis from two of the women. Their attention is eventually drawn to a dancing woman turned away from them, but she turns around to reveal a horrifically ugly, buck-toothed, deformed face (which was later illustrated in a sketch by Swiss artist H. R. Giger titled "The Windowlickers"), much to the men's horror. The video ends with the women dancing on Santa Monica Beach while James opens and sprays a bottle of champagne.

James's faces are not digitally morphed on the women; masks and make-up in his likeness were specifically designed by the production. The cast for the dialogue intro of the clip are Marcus Morris, Gary Cruz, Marcy Turner and Chiquita Martin.

There are 127 uses of profanity in the introductory dialogue segment of the video (which is under 4 minutes), including 44 uses of the word "fuck". This averages to more than one use of profanity every two seconds. The full "Windowlicker" video is restricted to being broadcast only during the nighttime on most music television channels. A bleeped-out version of the video exists, and MTV Two even made a daytime version, with all the opening dialogue removed (the censored version starts with the arrival of the limousine), along with some of its more graphic images. In 2008 MTV Networks Europe was fined by the UK media regulator Ofcom for several breaches of its broadcasting code, including airing the uncensored version of the "Windowlicker" video on TMF in 2006 before the 9 PM watershed.

The video was released as a VHS single containing both uncut and censored versions (the latter being referred to as the "Bleep Version"). It was also nominated for the Best British Video award at the 2000 Brit Awards.

== Reception ==
Professional ratings
Review scores
Source	Rating
AllMusic	4/5 stars
Pitchfork	8.5/10
The Rolling Stone Album Guide	5/5 stars

"Windowlicker" was acclaimed. AllMusic gave the single 4/5 stars, and was named by NME as Single of the Year in its 1999 year-end charts. In September 2010 Pitchfork Media included the song at number 12 on their list of the "Top 200 Tracks of the 90s". In March 2025, Billboard magazine ranked it number 81 in their list of "The 100 Best Dance Songs of All Time".

== Remixes and use in other media ==
A remix of "Windowlicker" in the acid techno style, entitled "Windowlicker, Acid Edit", is available on the remix compilation 26 Mixes for Cash. Another remix of "Windowlicker", entitled "WINDuckyQuaCKer", appears on V/VM's HelpAphexTwin/1.0 (2001) and HelpAphexTwin 4.0 (2003). A remix entitled "it's a richJAMs World" appears on V/VM's HelpAphexTwin 4.0 (2003). Run Jeremy (an alias of Danish producer Anders Trentemøller) also made his own remix of "Windowlicker". Beardyman performed a live version of "Windowlicker" as part of his Edinburgh show in 2009.

A. G. Cook produced a "note-for-note" cover of "Windowlicker" in 2017 as part of the PC Music compilation Month of Mayhem.

== Track listing ==
All tracks written, produced and engineered by Richard D. James. The original single was released on 12-inch, two separate CDs, a special edition Japanese CD and VHS.

=== CD1 and 12-inch vinyl ===
WAP105CD/WAP105
No.	Title	Length
1.	"Windowlicker"	6:07
2.	"$\Delta M_i^{-1} = - \alpha \sum_{n=1}^N D_i \left[ n \right] \left[ \sum_{j \in C \left[ i \right]}^{} F_{ji} \left[ n -1 \right] + Fext_i \left[ n^{-1} \right] \right]$" (commonly referred to as "[Equation]" or "[Formula]")	5:43
3.	"Nannou"	4:13
Total length:		16:03

=== CD2 ===
WAP105CDR
No.	Title	Length
1.	"Windowlicker" (original demo)	2:37

- The "Windowlicker" video is also included in QuickTime format.

=== Japanese version ===
WPCR-10328
No.	Title	Length
1.	"Windowlicker"	6:04
2.	"$\Delta M_i^{-1} = - \alpha \sum_{n=1}^N D_i \left[ n \right] \left[ \sum_{j \in C \left[ i \right]}^{} F_{ji} \left[ n-1 \right] + Fext_i \left[ n^{-1} \right] \right]$"	5:43
3.	"Nannou"	4:22
4.	"Windowlicker" (demo version)	1:57
5.	"Windowlicker" (end-roll version)	1:07
Total length:		19:13

== Chart positions ==
Chart (1999)	Peak position
Australia (ARIA)	70
Denmark (Tracklisten)	15
France (SNEP)	60
Netherlands (Single Top 100)	63
New Zealand (Recorded Music NZ)	33
Sweden (Sverigetopplistan)	53
UK Singles (Official Charts)	16
UK Dance (Official Charts)	3
UK Independent (Official Charts)	4
