= Rubber Johnny =

- DVD cover art of Rubber Johnny
- Directed by: Chris Cunningham
- Written by: Chris Cunningham
- Produced by: Chris Cunningham
- Starring: Chris Cunningham; Elvis the dog Percy Rutterford (voice)
- Edited by: Chris Cunningham
- Music by: Aphex Twin
- Distributed by: Warp Films
- Release date: June 20, 2005 (United Kingdom)
- Running time: 6 minutes
- Language: English

Rubber Johnny is a 2005 British experimental short film/music video written, directed and produced by Chris Cunningham. It also features music by Aphex Twin.

== Plot ==
The film, entirely presented in infrared vision, begins with an out-of-focus closeup of Johnny (played by Cunningham) babbling incomprehensibly while being interviewed by an unseen man. At one point, Johnny mumbles the word "ma-ma" twice, after which the man asks if he wants his mother to come in. This causes Johnny to start breathing erratically and lose control, so the man gives Johnny a sedative injection to calm him down.

The video cuts to a fluorescent light turning on, a mouse crawling over a press-sticker credits list, followed by the title, "Rubber Johnny", which is shown written on a condom in a backward-playing shot of it being pulled off a penis.

Johnny sits recumbent in his wheelchair with his oversized head hanging over the back of it. He starts dancing to the Aphex Twin track "Afx237 v.7" while his chihuahua watches. His dancing involves him performing balancing tricks with his wheelchair and deflecting light beams with his hands. A door opens and Johnny is interrupted by an aggressive male voice. During this, Johnny is sitting upright in the wheelchair. The voice yells at him indistinctly, a slap to Johnny's face is implied, and the door is slammed shut.

Johnny snorts a large line of cocaine. He screams in the dark and hides behind a door, avoiding white light beams. Johnny's face smashes repeatedly into a glass surface, and each time chunks of his face articulate the vocals in the song. He is interrupted a second time by the voice, after which Johnny once again reclines back in his wheelchair and babbles at his chihuahua.

The credits roll over a night scene of a train passing in the distance.

== Production ==
Shot on DV night-vision, the film was made in Cunningham's own time as a home movie of sorts. After filming began in 2002, Rubber Johnny took three and half years of weekends to complete.

Cunningham explained that the effect of an exploding head was made using "just a tangerine and Plasticine with a banger inside it". He created some effects in his own kitchen instead of relying on CGI.

== Release ==
=== Home media ===
Rubber Johnny was released on DVD by Warp on 20 June and 12 July 2005. The latter release included a book on the film containing 40-odd pages.

== Reception ==
Pascal Wyse of The Guardian referred to it as "virtuosic grossness", stating, "there is more fleeting shock than real haunting. Perhaps, in all the synaptic mayhem, there is just no room for the viewer to contact their own demons." Treble.com listed the film in its "10 Terrifying Music Videos", calling it "both hilarious and terrifying".

Writing for The Telegraph, Chris Campion asserted that the video was "like a Looney Tunes short for a generation raised on video nasties and rave music".

Scott McKeating of Stylus Magazine awarded Rubber Johnny a 'B+' rating, lauding it as an "exceptionally entertaining odd short film" but only for viewers "with the right frame of mind". He additionally demanded that Cunningham "take it one step further and give us an hour and a half of warped material".

Founder of fact-checking website Snopes David Mikkelson noted the circulation of claims that the film was a documentation of real events. He noted that the "film itself is difficult to describe in ordinary terms".
