= Hillesøy (disambiguation) =

Hillesøy, Hillesøya, and Hillesøyna may refer to a number of places in Norway:

== Places ==
- Hillesøy Municipality, a former municipality in Troms county, Norway
- Hillesøy Church, a church in Tromsø Municipality in Troms county, Norway
- Hillesøya, an island in Tromsø Municipality in Troms county, Norway
- Hillesøya (Bømlo), an island in Bømlo Municipality in Vestland county, Norway
- Hillesøyna (Gulen), an island in Gulen Municipality in Vestland county, Norway
- Hillesøyna (Askøy), an island in Askøy Municipality in Vestland county, Norway
