= Hillesøy Municipality =

Former municipality in Troms, Norway

Hillesøy Municipality Hillesøy herred
- Former municipality
- Hillesø herred (historic name)
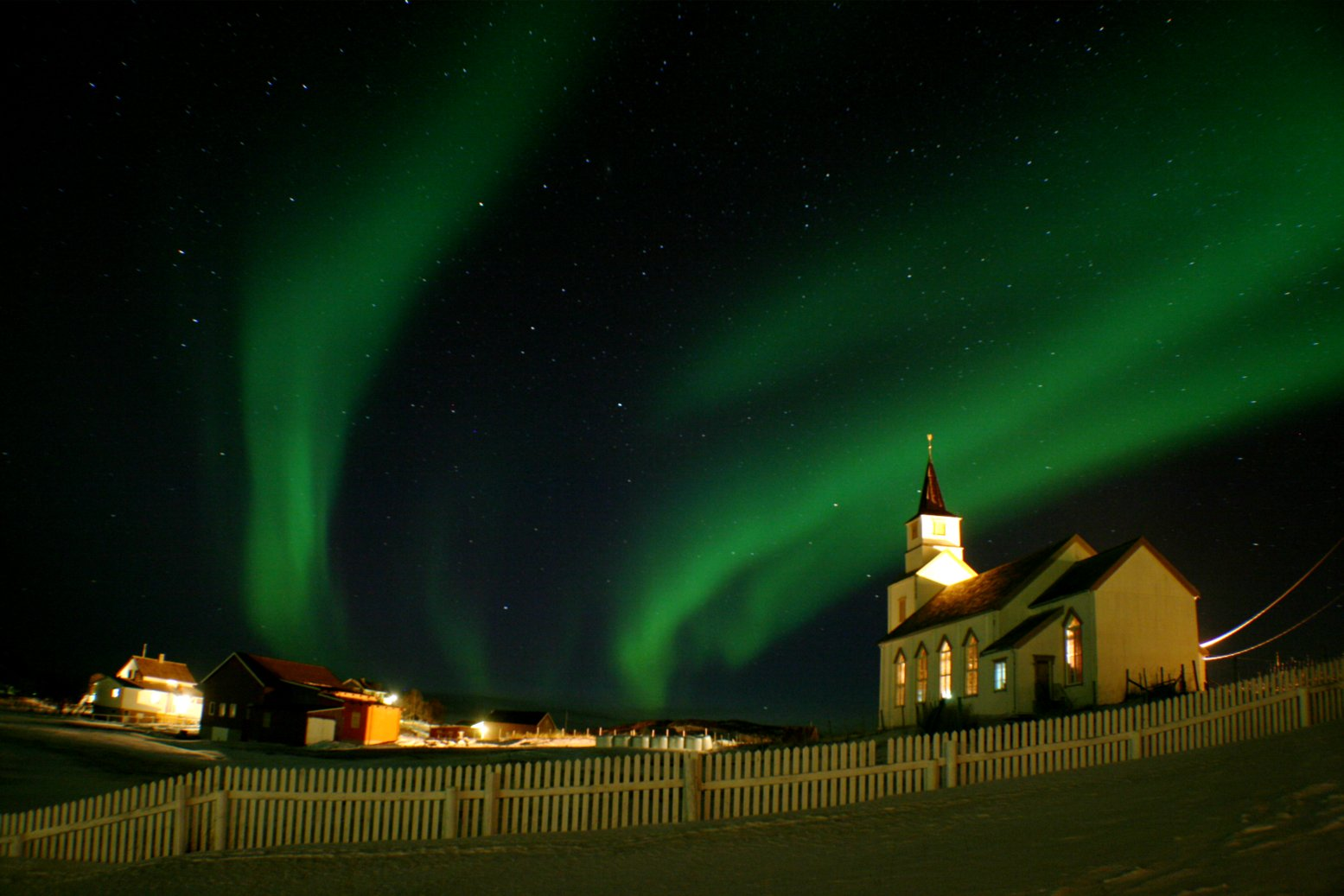
- Northern Lights over Hillesøy Church

- Troms within Norway

- Hillesøy within Troms
- Coordinates: 69°35′53″N 18°1′54″E
- Country: Norway
- County: Troms
- District: Hålogaland
- Established: 1855
  - Preceded by: Lenvik Municipality
- Disestablished: 1 January 1964
  - Succeeded by: Lenvik Municipality and Tromsø Municipality
- Administrative centre: Brensholmen

Government
  - Mayor (1946-1963): Edvin O. Haugland

Area (upon dissolution)
  - Total: 461.2 km^{2} (178.1 sq mi)
  - Rank: #214 in Norway
- Highest elevation: 942 m (3,091 ft)

Population (1963)
  - Total: 2,507
  - Rank: #365 in Norway
  - Density: 5.4/km^{2} (14/sq mi)
  - Change (10 years): ▼ −2.6%
- Demonym: Hillesøyværing

Official language
  - Norwegian form: Neutral
- Time zone: UTC+01:00 (CET)
  - Summer (DST): UTC+02:00 (CEST)
- ISO 3166 code: NO-1930

Hillesøy is a former municipality in Troms county in Norway. The 461-kilometre (286 mi) municipality existed from 1855 until its dissolution in 1964. It was located on both sides of the Malangen fjord in what is now Tromsø Municipality and Senja Municipality. The administrative centre was located at Brensholmen on the western shore of the island of Kvaløya. Brensholmen is also the location of Hillesøy Church, the main church for the municipality.

Prior to its dissolution in 1964, the 461.2-square-kilometre (178.1 sq mi) municipality was the 214th largest by area out of the 689 municipalities in Norway. Hillesøy Municipality was the 365th most populous municipality in Norway with a population of about 2,507. The municipality's population density was 5.4 inhabitants per square kilometre (14/sq mi) and its population had decreased by 2.6% over the previous 10-year period. Hillesøy Municipality included about 458 square kilometres (177 sq mi) of land with 164 square kilometres (63 sq mi) on the island of Senja, about 263 square kilometres (102 sq mi) on the island of Kvaløya, and about 31 square kilometres (12 sq mi) of smaller islands including Hillesøya and Sommarøya. On Senja island, Hillesøy Municipality included the larger villages of Fjordgård, Husøy, and Botnhamn. On Kvaløya island, it included Ersfjordbotn and Brensholmen. The island of Sommarøya is connected to the large island of Kvaløya by the Sommarøy Bridge. Most of the other islands are only accessible by boat.

== General information ==
The parish of Hillesøy (originally spelled Hillesø) was established as a municipality in 1855 when it was separated from the large Lenvik Municipality (or it might have been in 1871–some sources do not concur). The initial population of Hillesøy was around 800 people. During the 1960s, there were many municipal mergers across Norway due to the work of the Schei Committee. On 1 January 1964, Hillesøy Municipality was dissolved and its lands were divided as follows:

- The areas of Hillesøy on the island of Kvaløya as well as all of the islands north of the Malangen fjord (with 1,316 inhabitants in total) were merged with the city of Tromsø (population: 12,602), all of Tromsøysund Municipality (population: 16,727), and most of Ullsfjord Municipality except the Svensby area (population: 2,019) to form a new, enlarged Tromsø Municipality.
- The areas of Hillesøy on the island of Senja and the little island of Hekkingen (with 1,159 inhabitants in total) merged with Lenvik Municipality (population: 8,825), the part of Tranøy Municipality along the south shore of the river Lakselva (population: 106), and the part of Sørreisa Municipality on Senja island (population: 129) to form a new, larger Lenvik Municipality.

=== Name ===
The municipality is named after the old Hillesøy farm (Old Norse: Hillesøy) on the island of Hillesøya since the first Hillesøy Church was originally built there. The meaning of the name is not entirely clear. The first element of the old name may come from the old Norwegian male name Hildulfr. Another possibility is that the name was originally Hellisøy. If this is the case, then the first element would be derived from the word hellir which means "rock slab" or "cave". The last element of the name is not disputed. The last element is øy which means "island". Historically, the name of the municipality was spelled Hillesø. On 6 January 1908, a royal resolution changed the spelling of the name of the municipality to Hillesøy, to give the name a more Norwegian and less Danish spelling due to Norwegian language reforms.

=== Churches ===
The Church of Norway had one parish (sokn) within Hillesøy Municipality. It was part of the Hillesøy prestegjeld and the Trondenes prosti (deanery) in the Diocese of Nord-Hålogaland.

Churches in Hillesøy Municipality
Parish (sokn)	Church name	Location of the church	Year built
Hillesøy	Hillesøy Church	Brensholmen, Kvaløya	1889

== Geography ==
The highest point in the municipality was the 942-metre (3,091 ft) tall mountain Keipen on the island of Senja.

== Government ==
While it existed, Hillesøy Municipality was responsible for primary education (through 10th grade), outpatient health services, senior citizen services, welfare and other social services, zoning, economic development, and municipal roads and utilities. The municipality was governed by a municipal council of directly elected representatives. The mayor was indirectly elected by a vote of the municipal council. The municipality was under the jurisdiction of the Hålogaland Court of Appeal.

=== Municipal council ===
The municipal council (Herredsstyre) of Hillesøy Municipality was made up of 17 representatives that were elected to four year terms. The tables below show the historical composition of the council by political party.

Hillesøy herredsstyre 1959–1963
Party name (in Norwegian)	Number of representatives
List of workers, fishermen, and small farmholders (Arbeidere, fiskere, småbrukere liste)	5
Local List(s) (Lokale lister)	12
Total number of members:	17
Note: On 1 January 1964, Hillesøy Municipality became part of Lenvik Municipality and Tromsø Municipality.

Hillesøy herredsstyre 1955–1959
Party name (in Norwegian)	Number of representatives
Labour Party (Arbeiderpartiet)	5
List of workers, fishermen, and small farmholders (Arbeidere, fiskere, småbrukere liste)	1
Joint List(s) of Non-Socialist Parties (Borgerlige Felleslister)	4
Local List(s) (Lokale lister)	7
Total number of members:	17

Hillesøy herredsstyre 1951–1955
Party name (in Norwegian)	Number of representatives
Labour Party (Arbeiderpartiet)	4
List of workers, fishermen, and small farmholders (Arbeidere, fiskere, småbrukere liste)	3
Joint List(s) of Non-Socialist Parties (Borgerlige Felleslister)	4
Local List(s) (Lokale lister)	5
Total number of members:	16

Hillesøy herredsstyre 1947–1951
Party name (in Norwegian)	Number of representatives
Labour Party (Arbeiderpartiet)	8
List of workers, fishermen, and small farmholders (Arbeidere, fiskere, småbrukere liste)	3
Local List(s) (Lokale lister)	5
Total number of members:	16

Hillesøy herredsstyre 1945–1947
Party name (in Norwegian)	Number of representatives
Labour Party (Arbeiderpartiet)	5
Local List(s) (Lokale lister)	11
Total number of members:	16

Hillesøy herredsstyre 1937–1941*
Party name (in Norwegian)	Number of representatives
Labour Party (Arbeiderpartiet)	9
List of workers, fishermen, and small farmholders (Arbeidere, fiskere, småbrukere liste)	1
Local List(s) (Lokale lister)	6
Total number of members:	16
Note: Due to the German occupation of Norway during World War II, no elections were held for new municipal councils until after the war ended in 1945.

=== Mayors ===
The mayor (Norwegian: ordfører) of Hillesøy Municipality was the political leader of the municipality and the chairperson of the municipal council. The following people have held this position:

- 1855–1857: Ole Johan Olsen
- 1857–1859: John Pedersen
- 1859–1862: Daniel Heitmann Hansen
- 1863–1874: John Pedersen
- 1875–1878: Jacob Bolche Matheson
- 1879–1883: Peder Svendsen
- 1883–1886: Ole Larsen Aaker
- 1887–1889: Johannes Næstaas
- 1889–1904: Ole A. Hanssen
- 1904–1904: Ingvald Kristoffersen
- 1905–1907: Samuel O. Kvamme
- 1907–1913: Carl Bertheussen
- 1914–1919: Ingvald Kristoffersen
- 1920–1922: Carl Bertheussen
- 1923–1925: Kristoffer O. Larsen
- 1926–1928: Ingvald Kristoffersen
- 1929–1931: Alfred Olufsen
- 1932–1942: Thorvald Nordheim
- 1942–1942: Carl Bersvendsen
- 1942–1945: Hagerup Paulsen
- 1945–1945: Alfon Engenes
- 1946–1963: Edvin O. Haugland

== See also ==
- List of former municipalities of Norway
