= Kvaløy Church =

- Kvaløy kirke
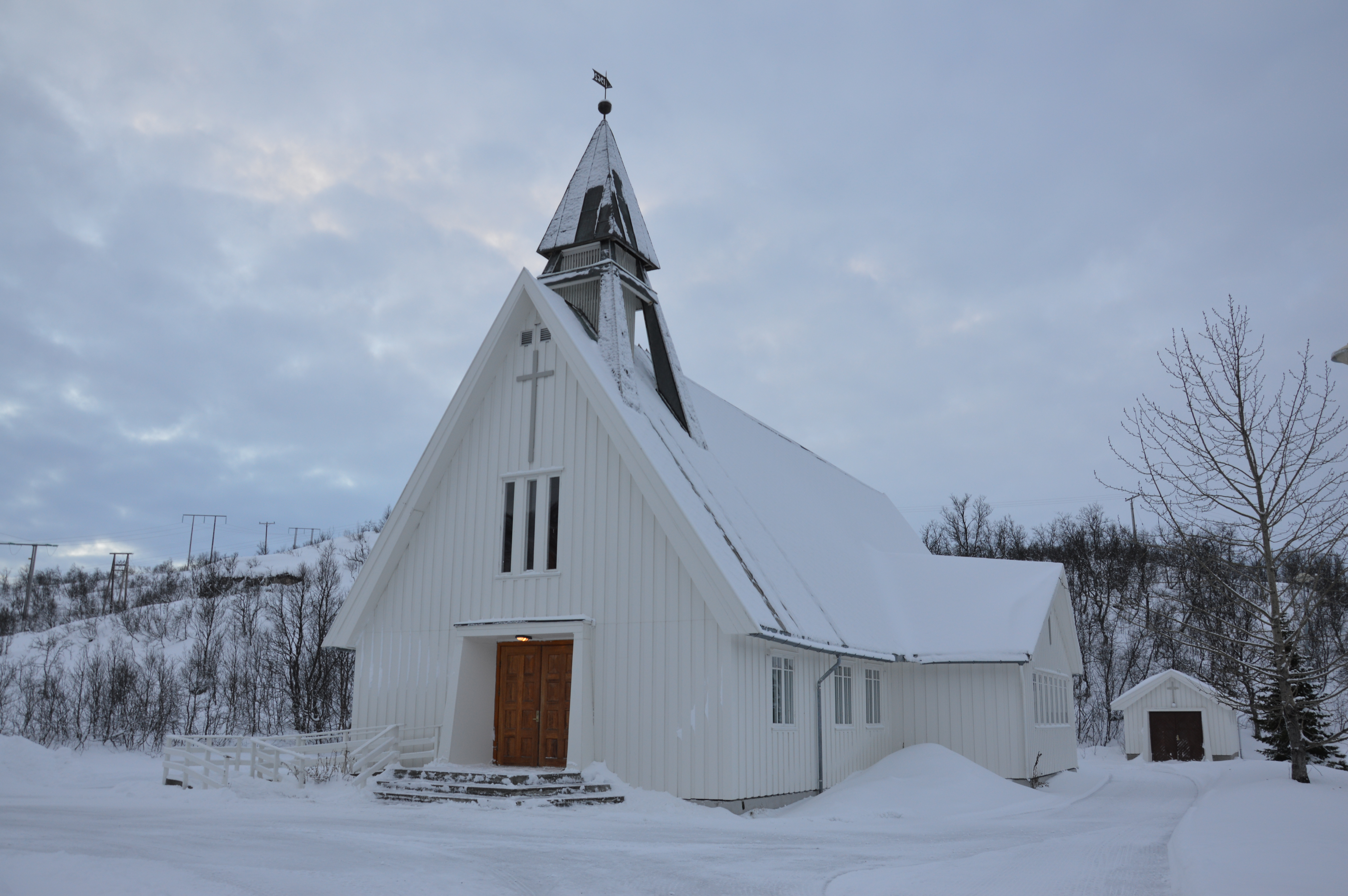
- View of the church
- Kvaløy Church
- 69.680601°N 18.744188°E
- Location: Tromsø Municipality, Troms
- Country: Norway
- Denomination: Church of Norway
- Churchmanship: Evangelical Lutheran

History
- Status: Parish church
- Founded: 1962
- Consecrated: 1962

Architecture
- Functional status: Active
- Architect: Gunnar B. Haugen
- Architectural type: Cruciform
- Completed: 1962 (64 years ago)

Specifications
- Capacity: 260
- Materials: Wood

Administration
- Diocese: Nord-Hålogaland
- Deanery: Tromsø domprosti
- Parish: Kvaløy
- Norwegian Cultural Heritage Site
- Type: Church
- Status: Not protected
- ID: 84849

Kvaløy Church (Norwegian: Kvaløy kirke) is a parish church of the Church of Norway in Tromsø Municipality in Troms county, Norway. It is located in the village of Kaldfjord on the island of Kvaløya. It is the church for the Kvaløy parish which is part of the Tromsø domprosti (arch-deanery) in the Diocese of Nord-Hålogaland. The white, wooden church was built in a cruciform style in 1962 using designs drawn up by the architect Gunnar B. Haugen. The church seats about 260 people.

== Media gallery ==
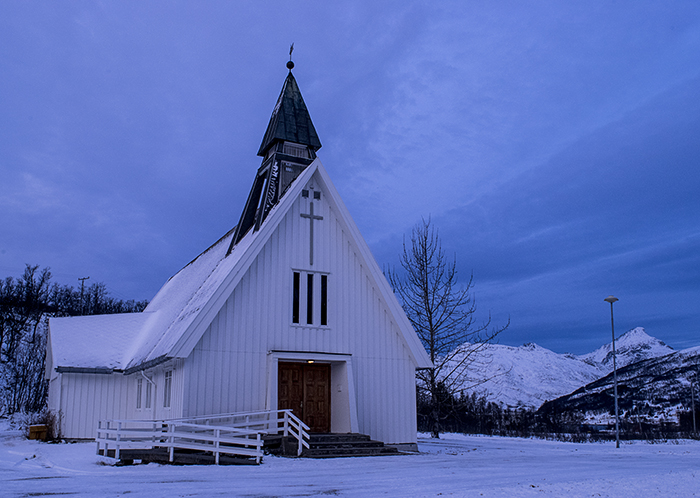

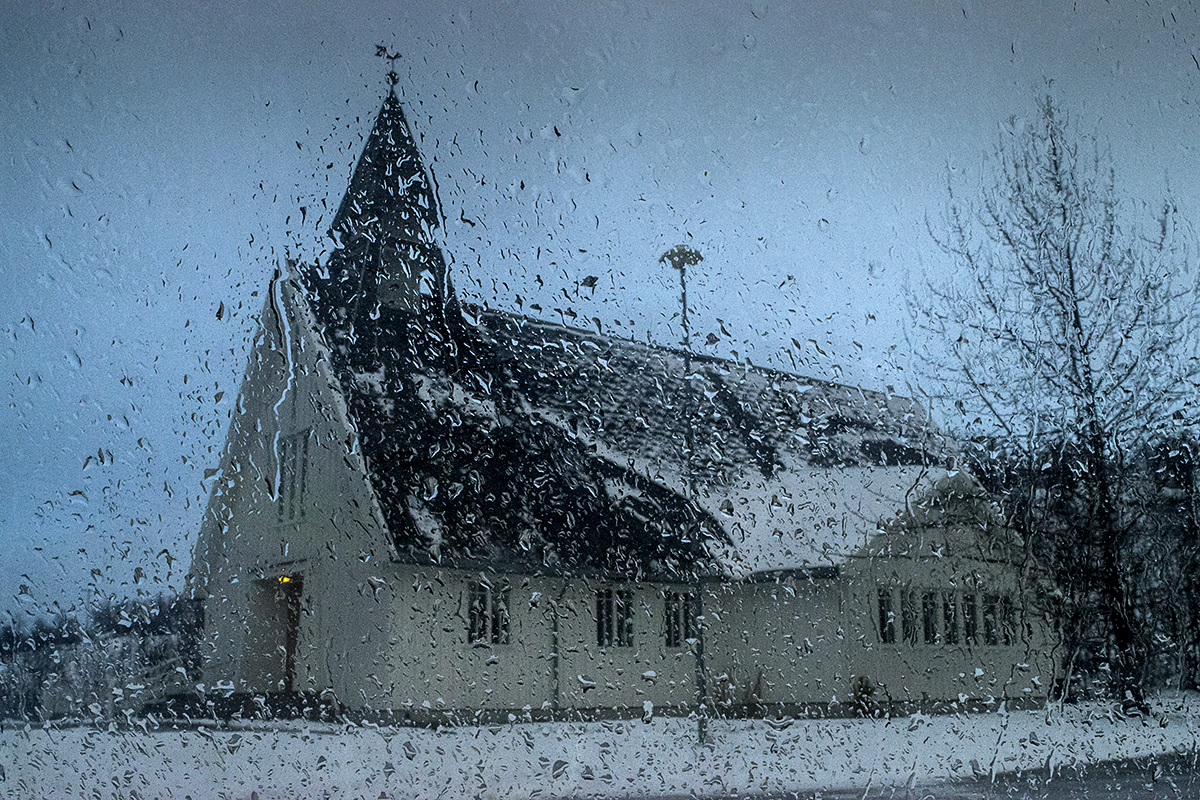

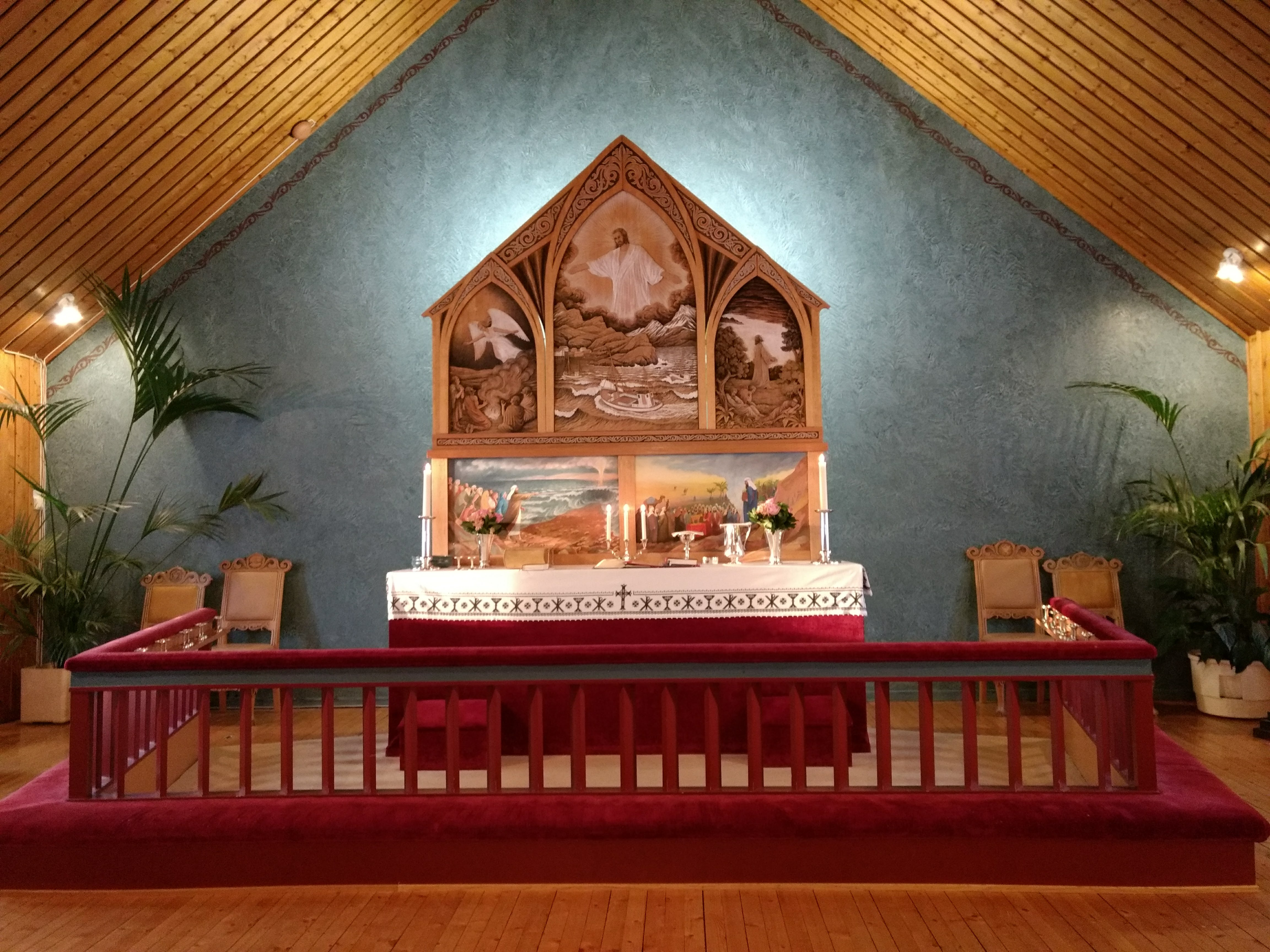

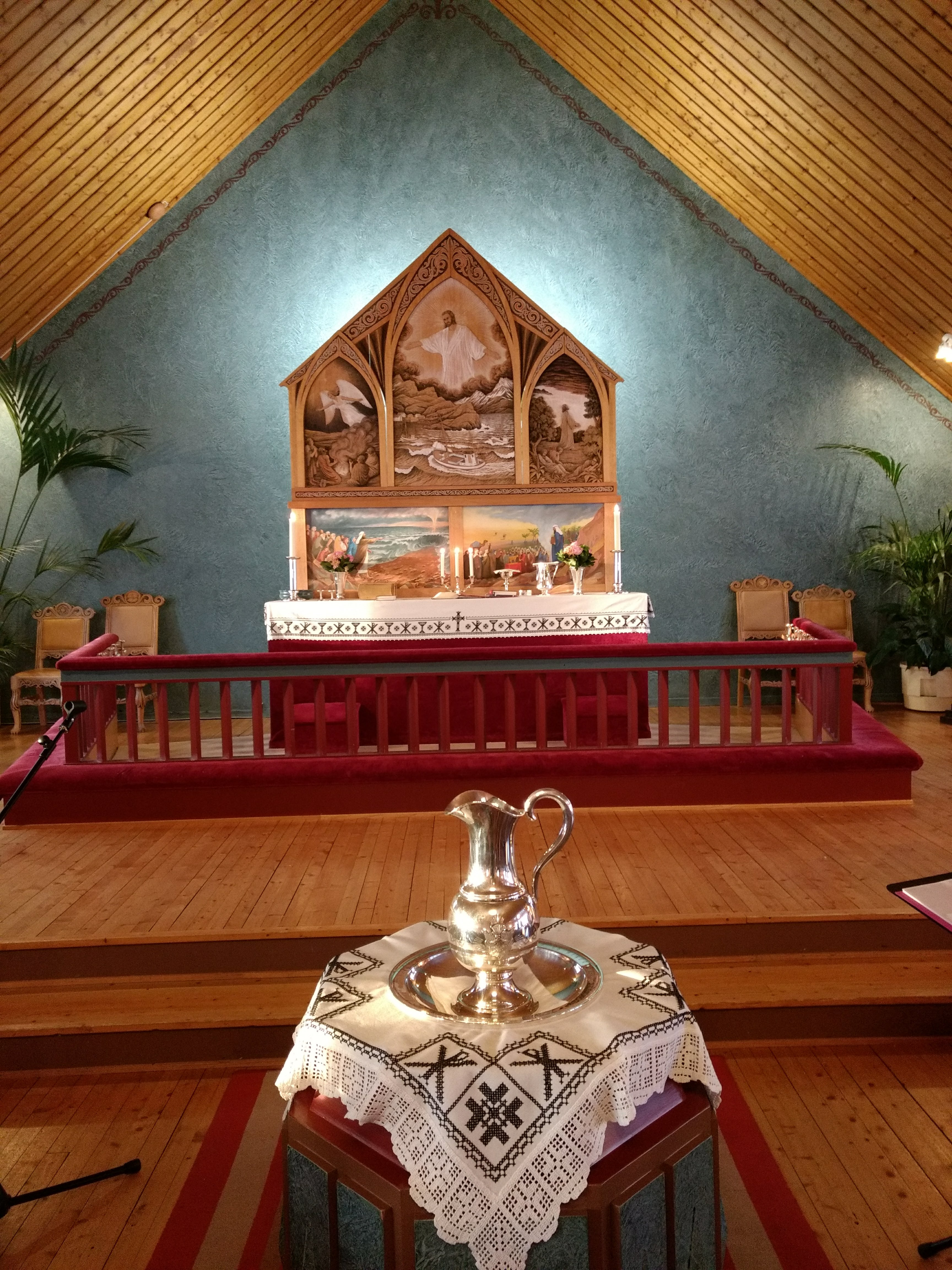

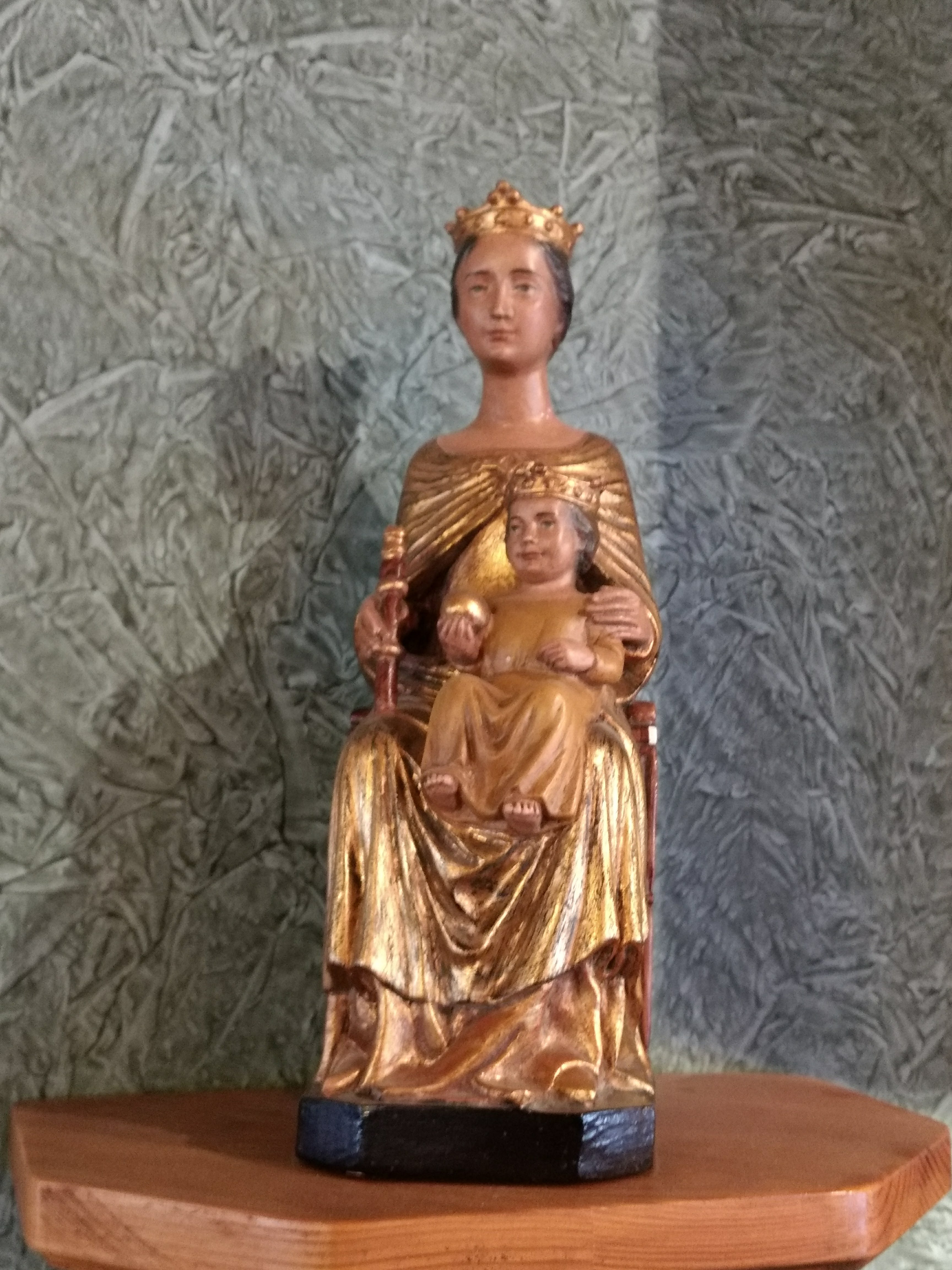

== See also ==
- List of churches in Nord-Hålogaland
