= Store Sommarøya =

Island in Tromsø, Norway

Store Sommarøya Sommarøya
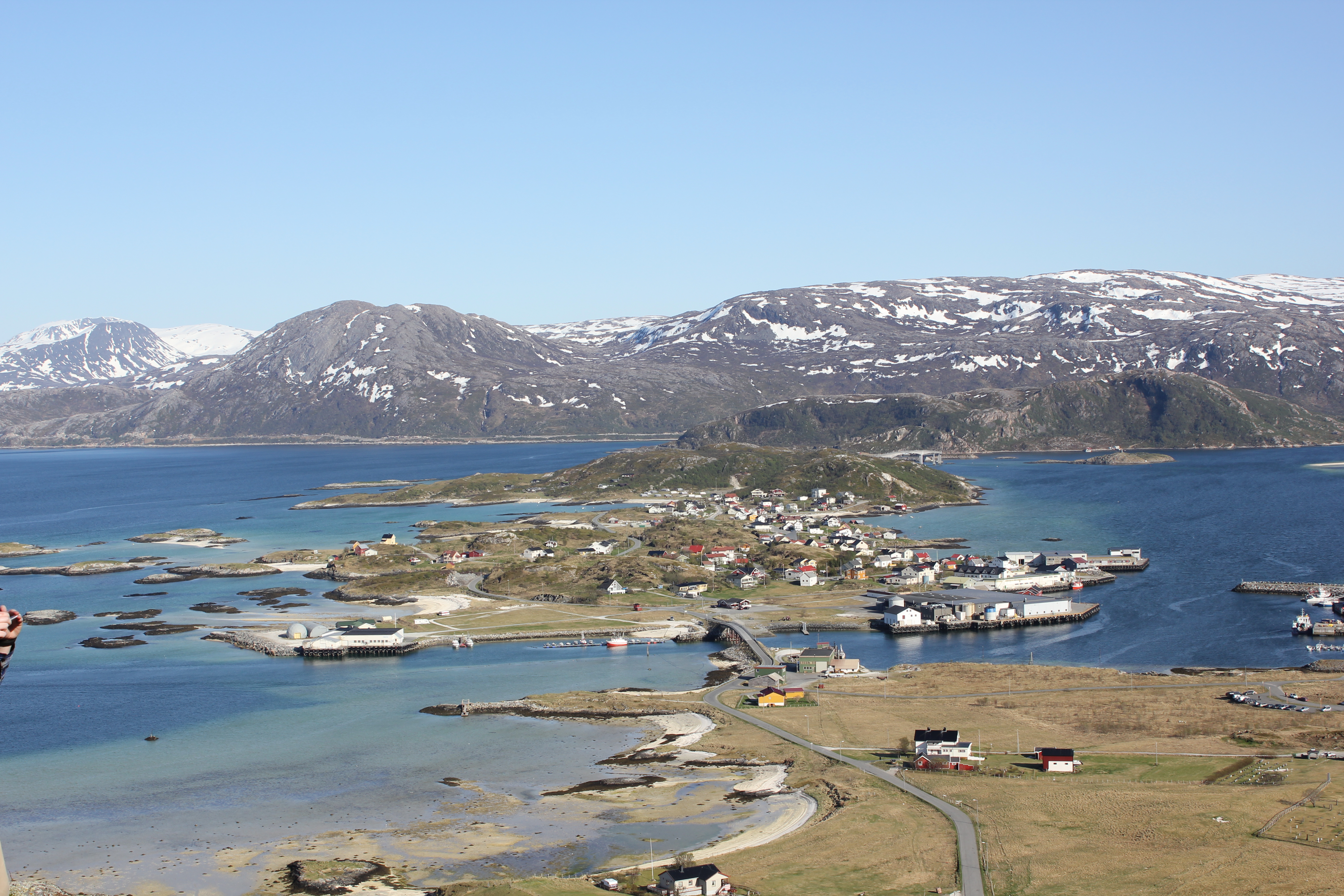
- View of the island
- Interactive map of Store Sommarøya; Sommarøya

Geography
- Location: Troms, Norway
- Coordinates: 69.6272°N 18.0300°E
- Area: 0.9 km^{2} (0.35 sq mi)
- Length: 2 km (1.2 mi)
- Width: 750 m (2460 ft)
- Highest elevation: 55 m (180 ft)

Administration
- Norway
- County: Troms
- Municipality: Tromsø Municipality

Aerial imagery of the island of Sommarøy.

Store Sommarøya or Sommarøya is an island in Tromsø Municipality in Troms county, Norway.

== Location ==
The 0.9-square-kilometre (220-acre) island is located about 36 kilometres (22 mi) west of the city of Tromsø and is a popular tourist destination due to its white sand beaches and scenery. The island is connected to the large neighboring island of Kvaløya by the Sommarøy Bridge and it is connected to the small island of Hillesøya by the Hillesøy Bridge. The fishing village of Sommarøy covers Store Sommarøya and part of Hillesøya.

== Climate ==
Despite its extreme latitude, more than 300 kilometres (190 mi) north of the Arctic Circle, Sommarøya experiences an ocean-moderated subarctic climate (Cfc) with no month averaging below −2 °C (28 °F) and a mean annual temperature of almost 4 °C (39 °F).

Climate data for Sommarøy, Norway 1981 - 2010,
Month	Jan	Feb	Mar	Apr	May	Jun	Jul	Aug	Sep	Oct	Nov	Dec	Year
Daily mean °C (°F)	−1.9 (28.6)	−1.9 (28.6)	−1.0 (30.2)	1.7 (35.1)	5.5 (41.9)	8.9 (48.0)	11.9 (53.4)	11.4 (52.5)	8.1 (46.6)	4.5 (40.1)	1.0 (33.8)	−1.1 (30.0)	3.9 (39.1)
Average precipitation mm (inches)	81 (3.2)	72 (2.8)	67 (2.6)	58 (2.3)	48 (1.9)	59 (2.3)	65 (2.6)	73 (2.9)	93 (3.7)	123 (4.8)	99 (3.9)	102 (4.0)	940 (37)

== Media gallery ==
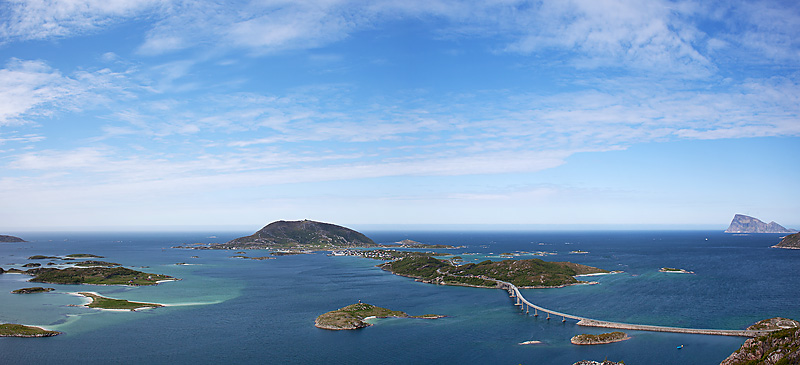
View to Sommarøya and Hillesøya

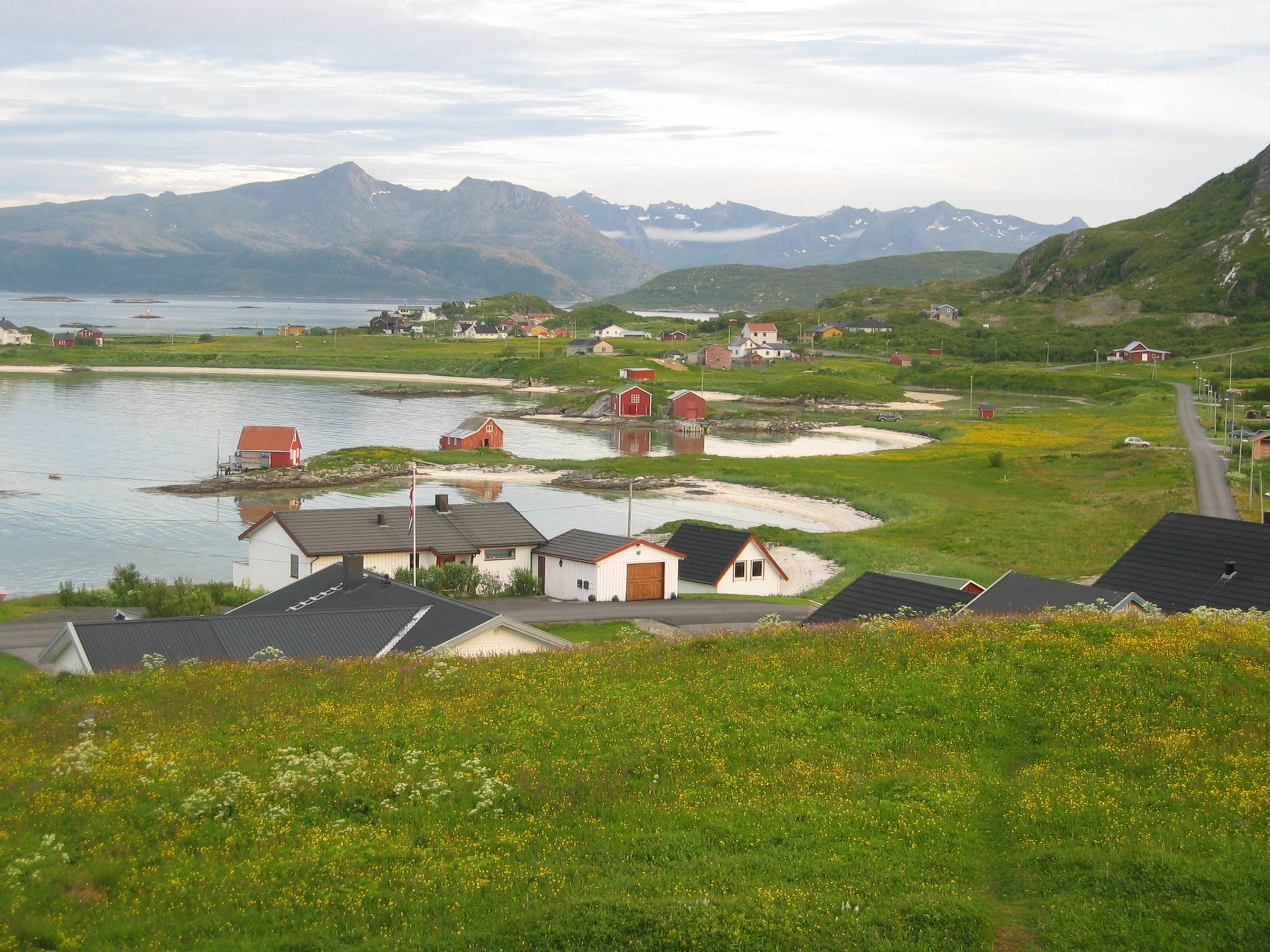
Looking south

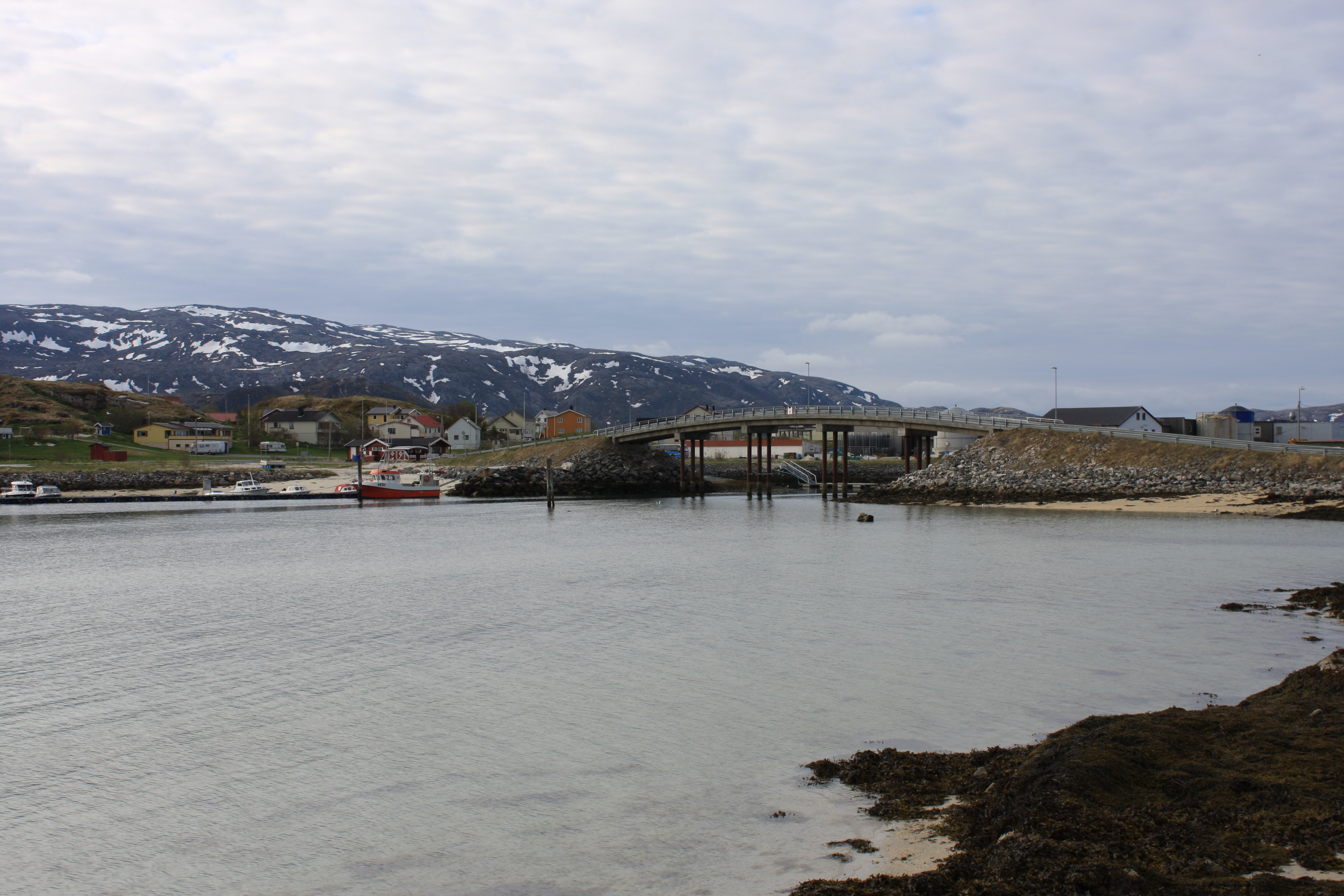
Looking south from Hillesøya to Sommarøy

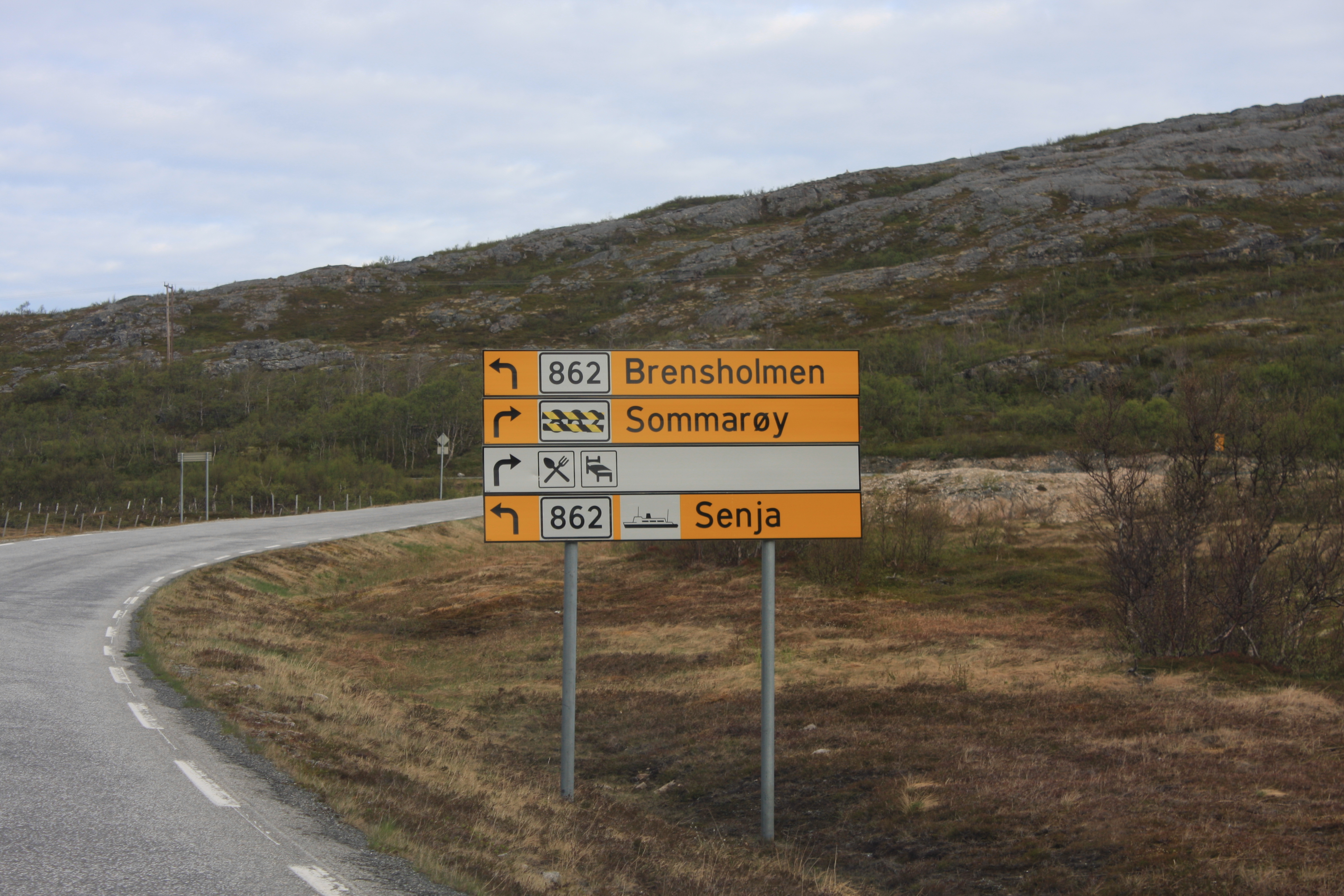
Road sign in Sandvika on riksvei 862 outside of Tromsø

== See also ==
- List of islands of Norway
