= Sommarøy =

Village in Tromsø Municipality, Norway

Sommarøya Sommarøy
- Village
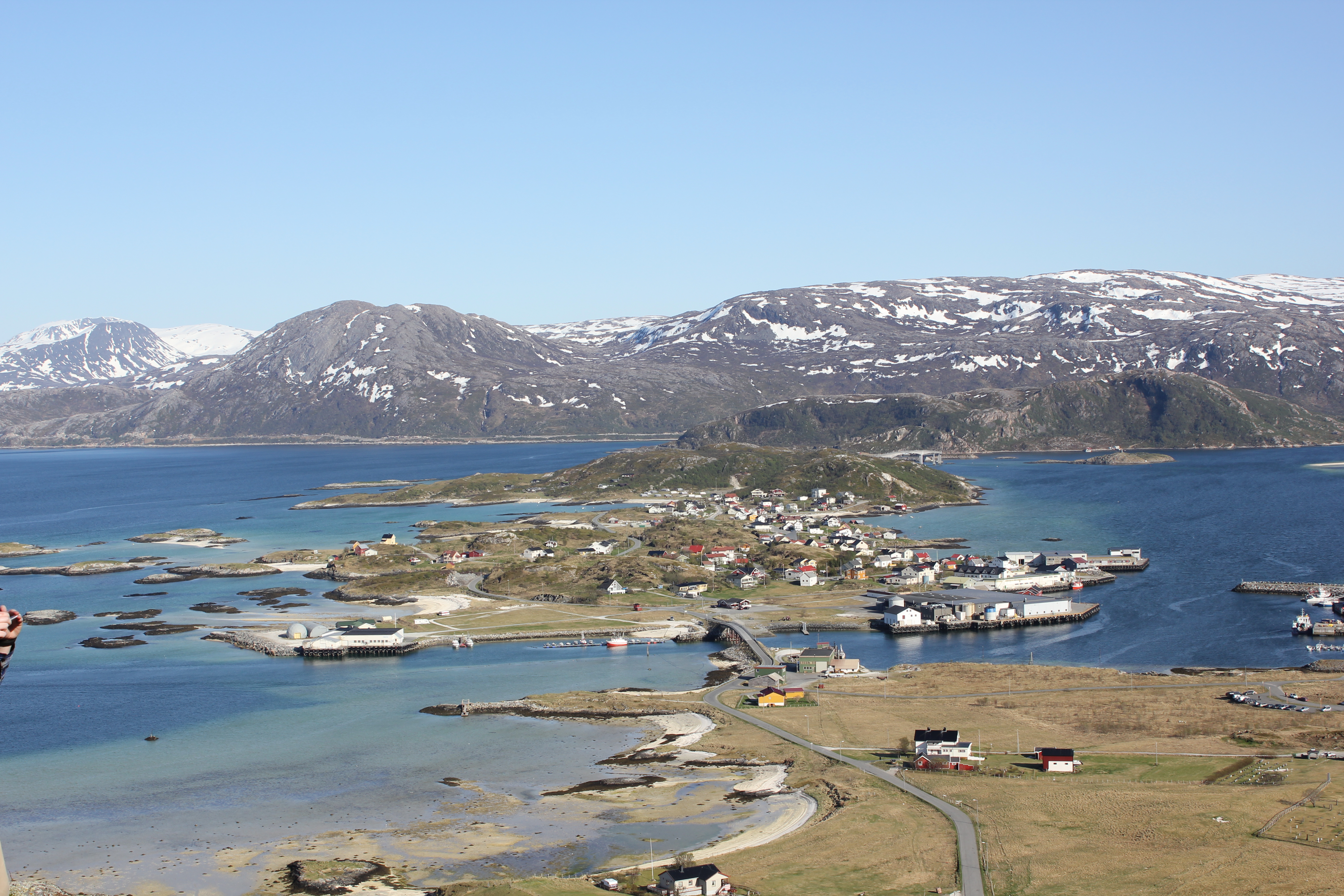
- View of the village
- Interactive map of Sommarøya
- Location within Troms Location within Norway
- Coordinates: 69.6336°N 18.0073°E
- Country: Norway
- Region: Northern Norway
- County: Troms
- District: Hålogaland
- Municipality: Tromsø Municipality

Area
  - Total: 0.41 km^{2} (0.16 sq mi)
- Elevation: 8 m (26 ft)

Population (2023)
  - Total: 304
  - Density: 741/km^{2} (1,920/sq mi)
- Time zone: UTC+01:00 (CET)
  - Summer (DST): UTC+02:00 (CEST)
- Post Code: 9110 Sommarøy

Sommarøy or Sommerøya is an old fishing village in the western part of Tromsø Municipality in Troms county, Norway. It is located about 36 kilometres (22 mi) west of the city of Tromsø and is a popular tourist destination due to its white sand beaches and scenery. As of 2023 the 0.41-square-kilometre (100-acre) village had a population of 304 and a population density of 741 inhabitants per square kilometre (1,920/sq mi).

The fishing village of Sommarøy covers the island of Store Sommarøya as well as part of the neighboring island of Hillesøya and smaller surrounding islands. The village is a typical fishing village with great local fishing fleets and substantial fish processing and other industries. Tourism is also important in Sommarøy. There is a hotel and rental cabins are available.

== History ==
The original settlement site was on the neighboring island of Hillesøya where the old Hillesøy Church was located. This site was where successive churches have stood from the Middle Ages until the late 1800s when the church was moved to Brensholmen on the island of Kvaløya. The main centre of the village moved to Store Sommarøya island around 1900.

== Time ==
On the island of Sommarøy, the sun does not set from 18 May to 26 July, a full 69 days. This is then followed by long polar nights from November to January, when the sun does not rise at all due to the location north of the Arctic Circle.

In June 2019, Innovation Norway conducted a marketing campaign – called fake news by some – claiming that local inhabitants wanted Sommarøy to declare itself as the world's first time-free zone and had petitioned the Norwegian government to abolish civil time on the island. The story was covered in more than 1650 articles which potentially reached up to 1.2 billion people. The value of this coverage was estimated at 11.4 million USD, compared to the less than US$60,000 Innovation Norway spent on the campaign.

== Gallery ==
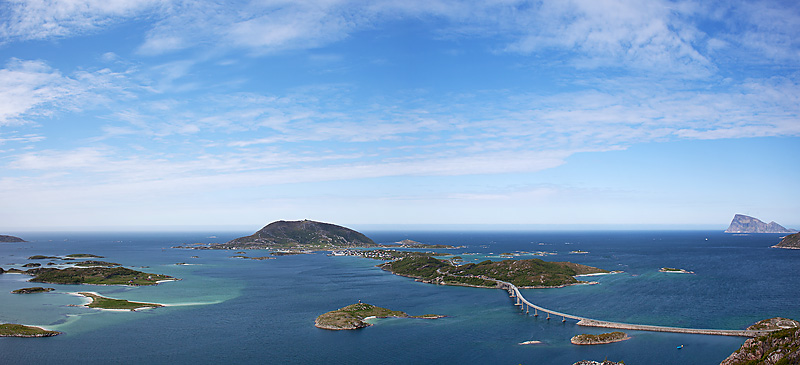
Hillesøya and Sommarøy islands

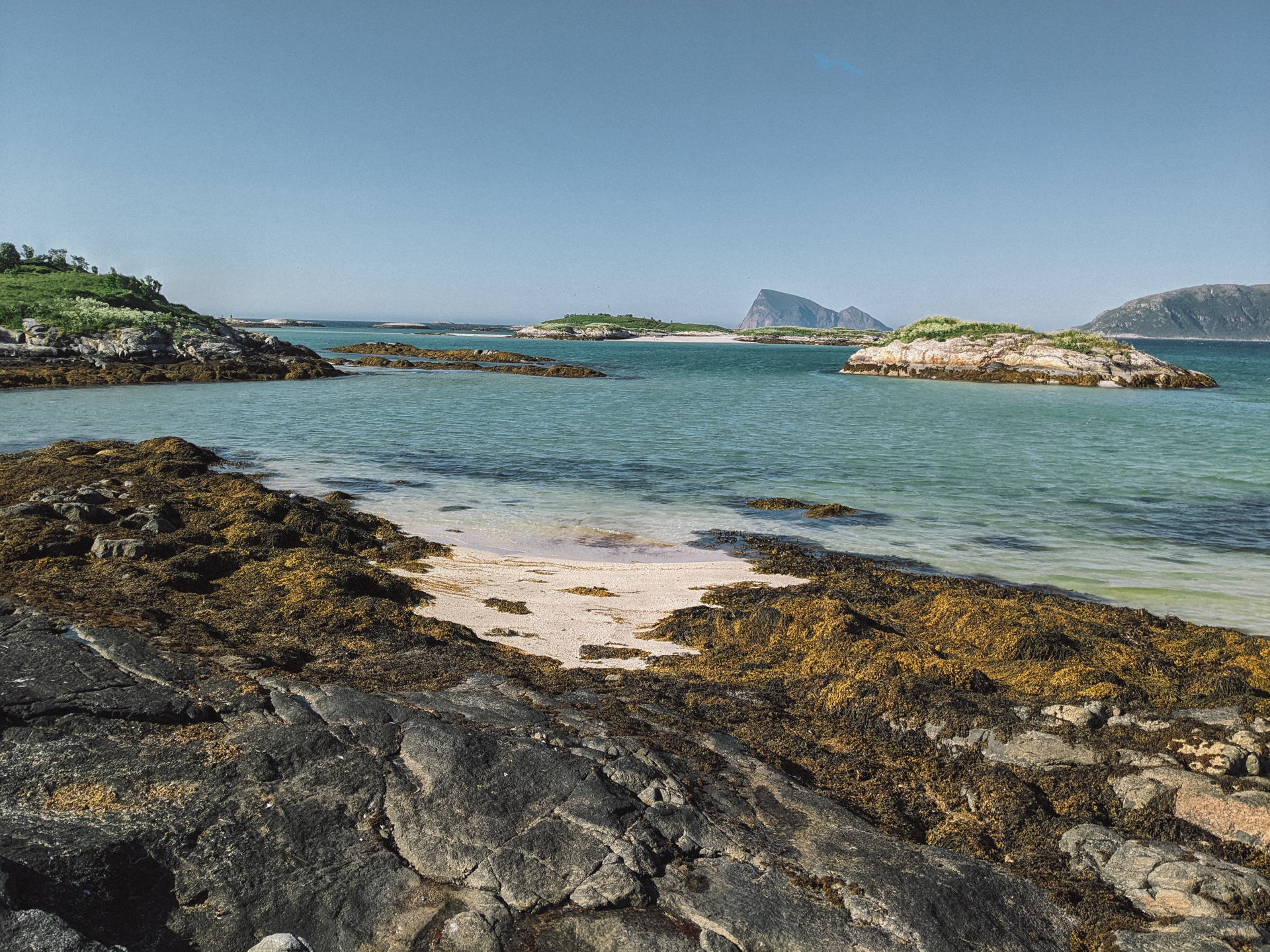
Sandy beach on Sommarøy

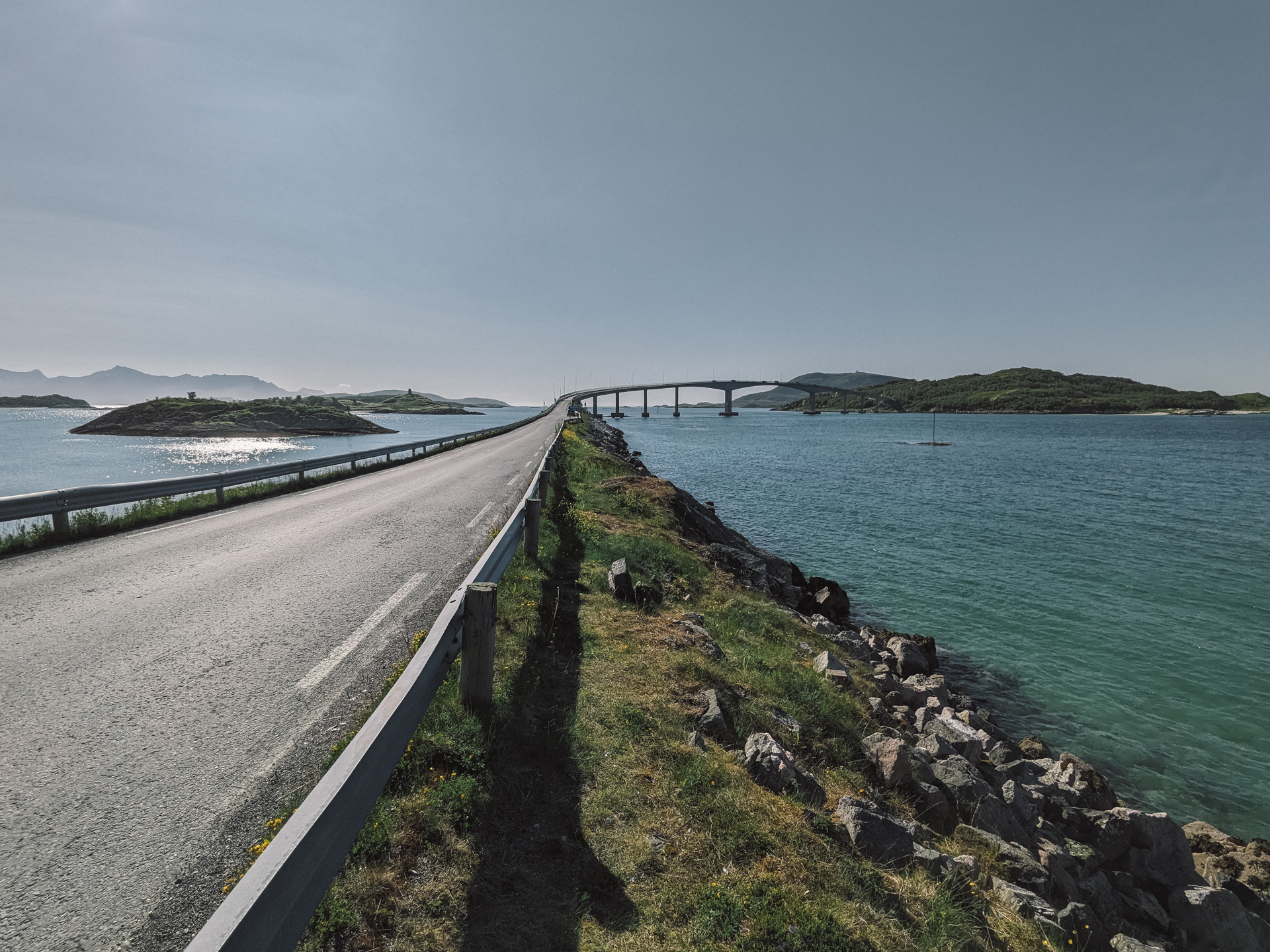
Sommarøy Bridge

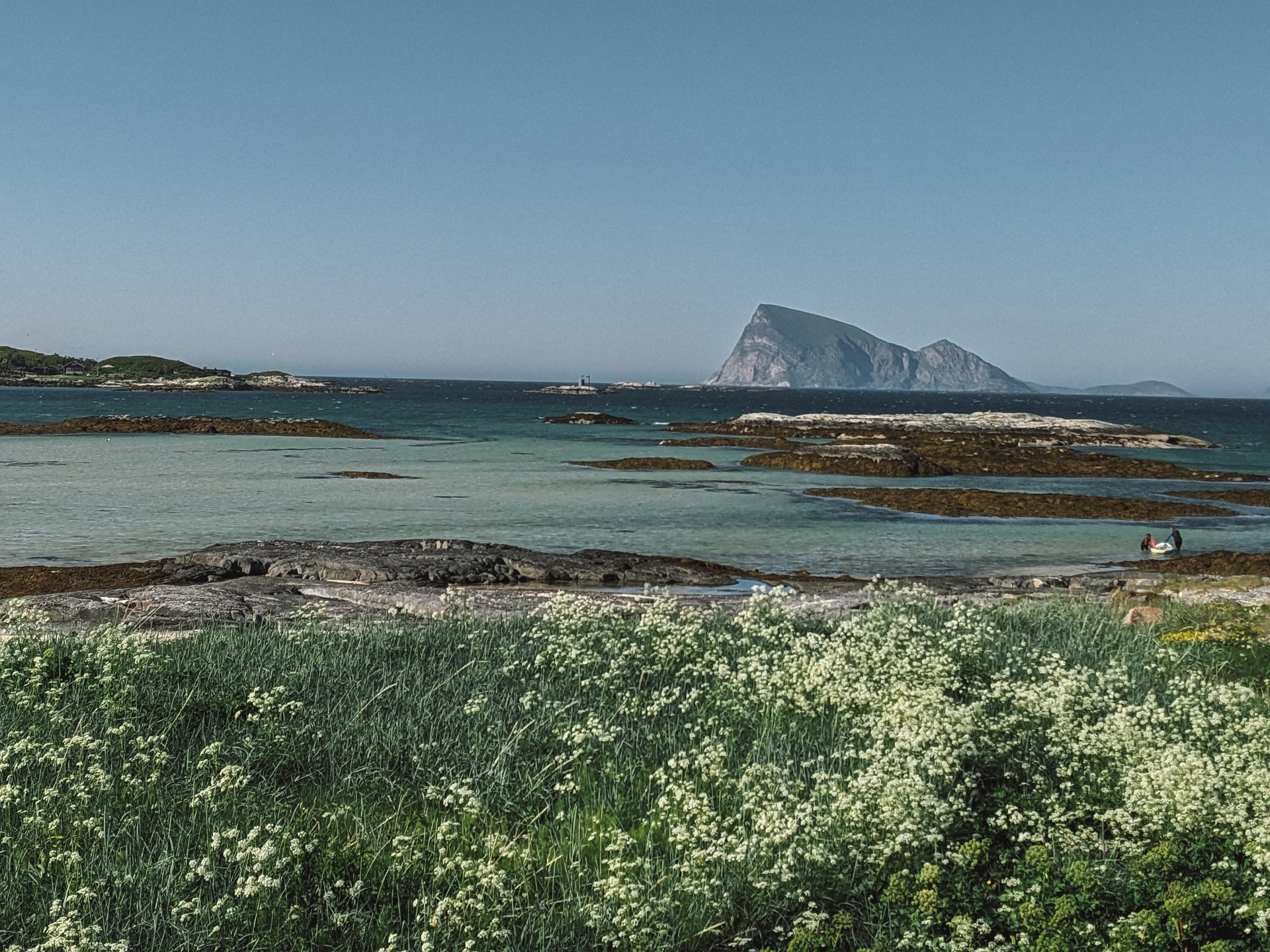
Håja seen from Sommarøy
