= Sommarøy Bridge =

Sommarøy Bridge Sommarøybrua
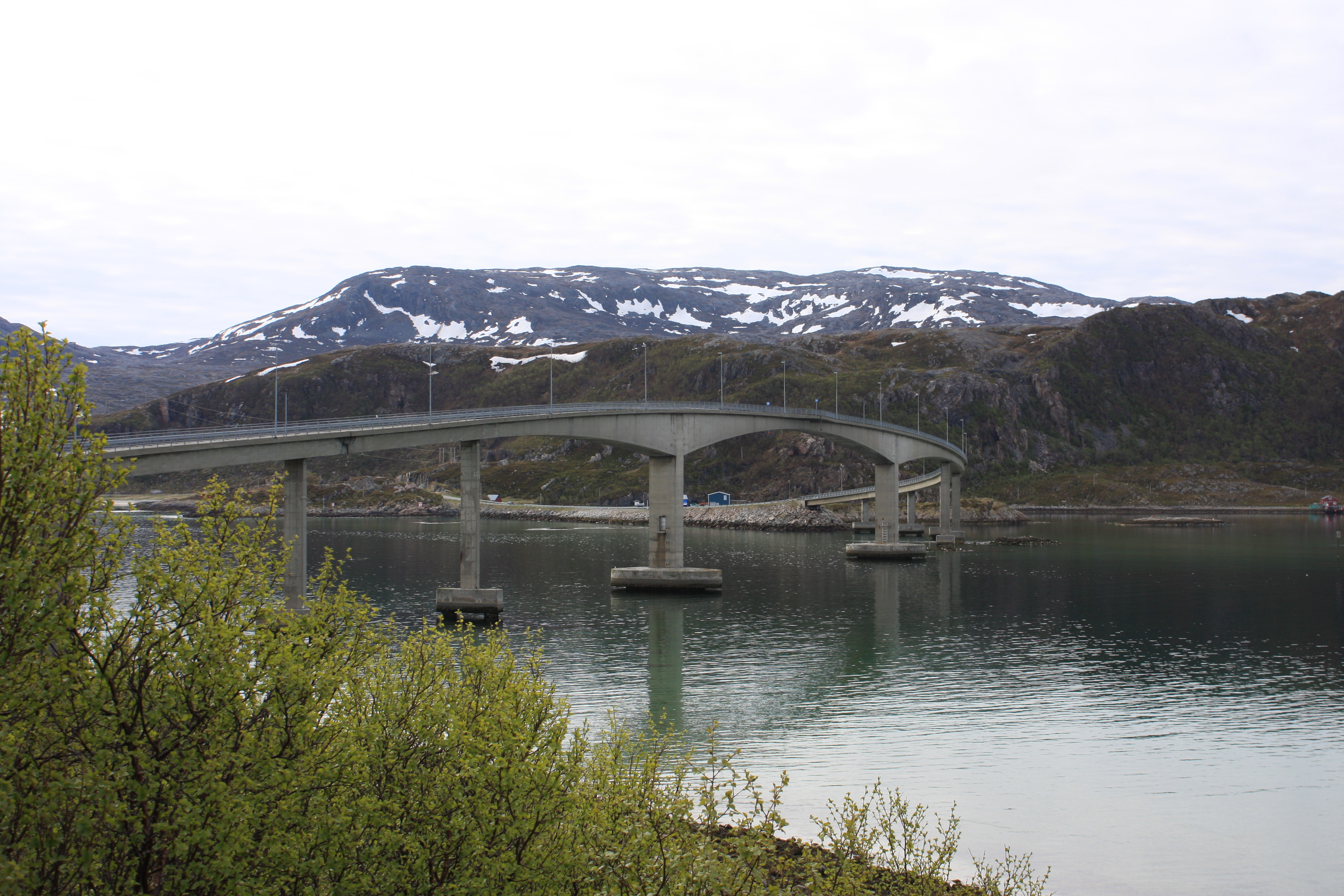
- The bridge to Sommarøya in Tromsø municipality
- Coordinates: 69°37′25″N 18°02′44″E
- Carries: Fv55
- Crosses: Sommarøysundet
- Locale: Tromsø Municipality, Troms, Norway

Characteristics
- Design: Cantilever bridge
- Total length: 522 metres (1,713 ft)
- Longest span: 120 metres (390 ft)

Location
- Interactive map of Sommarøy Bridge

Sommarøy Bridge (Norwegian: Sommarøybrua) is a cantilever bridge connecting the islands of Kvaløya and Sommarøy in the Hillesøy area of Tromsø Municipality in Troms county, Norway. The prestressed concrete bridge is 522 metres (1,713 ft) long and the longest span on the bridge is 120 metres (390 ft).

Sommarøy Bridge has traffic lights to prevent accidents on the narrow bridge, although it was reported, in 2004, that the traffic lights malfunction in windy weather.

== Gallery ==
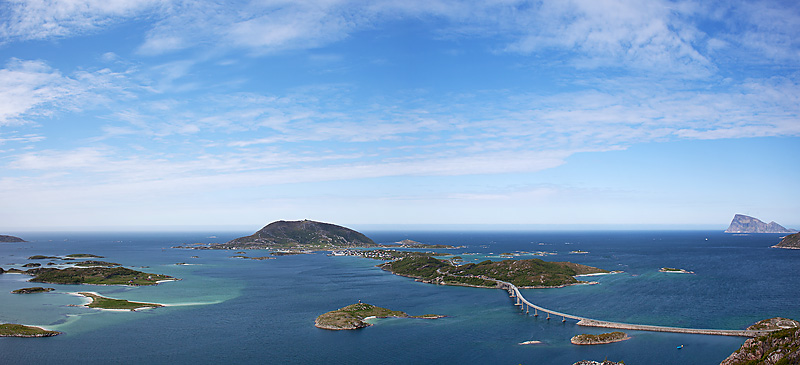
Hillesøya and Sommarøy islands

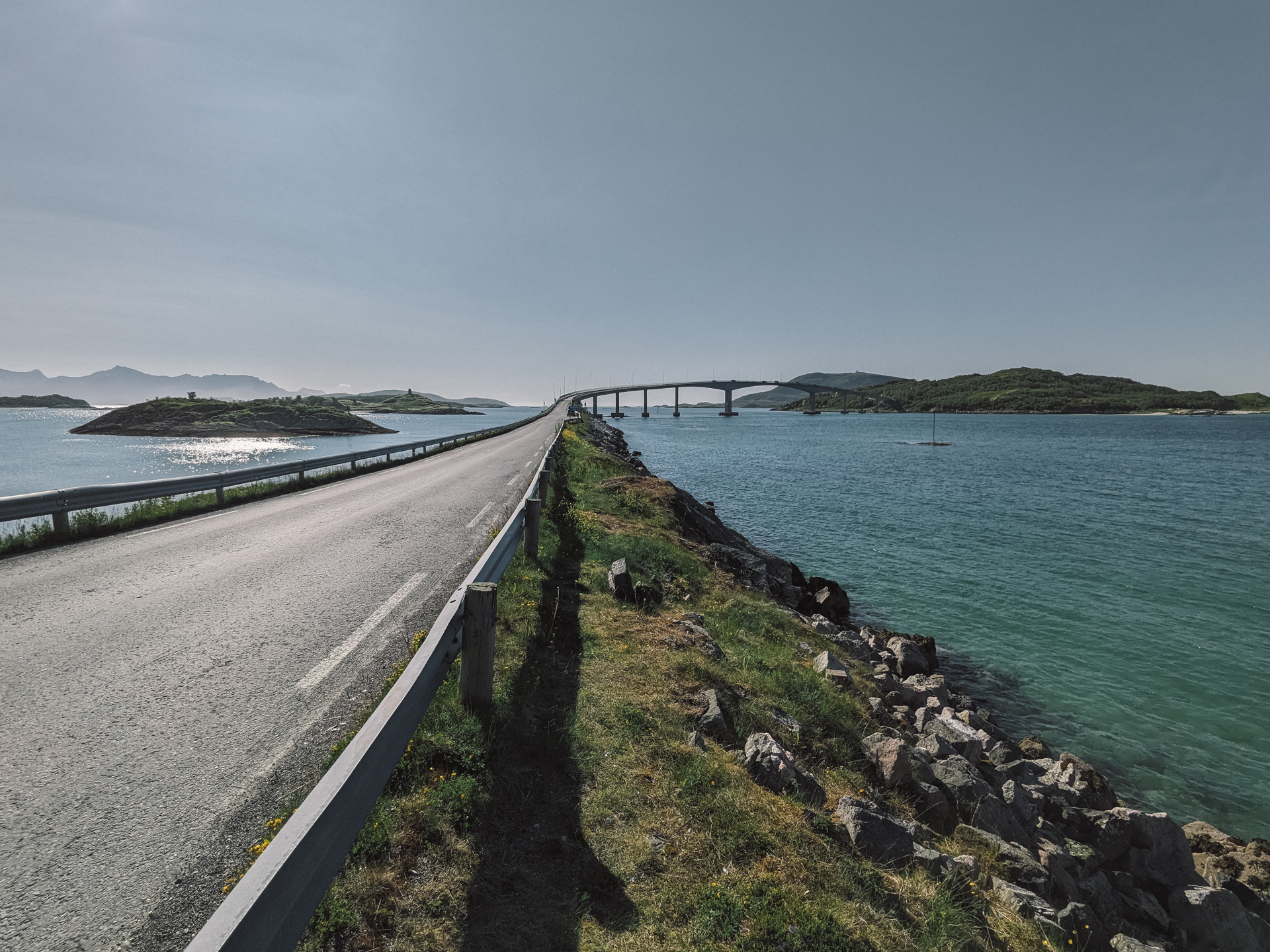
Sommarøy Bridge
