= Hillesøya =

Island in Troms, Norway

Hillesøya (Norwegian); Hilssát (Northern Sami)
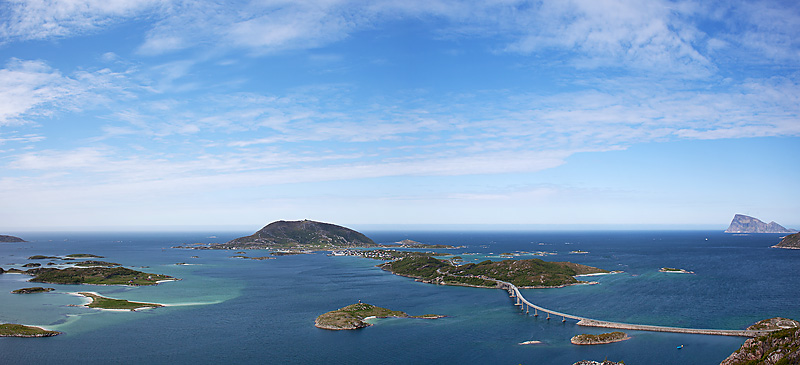
- Hillesøya is in the center with the large rounded mountain.
- Interactive map of: Hillesøya (Norwegian); Hilssát (Northern Sami)

Geography
- Location: Troms, Norway
- Coordinates: 69.6413°N 17.9781°E
- Area: 1.8 km^{2} (0.69 sq mi)
- Width: 2.1 km (1.3 mi)
- Coastline: 1.9 km (1.18 mi)
- Highest elevation: 211 m (692 ft)
- Highest point: Nordkollen

Administration
- Norway
- County: Troms
- Municipality: Tromsø Municipality

Demographics
- Population: 25 (2018)

Hillesøya (Norwegian) or Hilssát (Northern Sami) is an island and fishing village in Tromsø Municipality in Troms county, Norway. The 1.8-square-kilometre (0.69 sq mi) island is dominated by a mountain, but the southeastern third of the island is relatively flat and that is where the residents of the island live. In 2018, there were 25 inhabitants on the island. The island lies just north of the island of Store Sommarøya and it is connected by the Hillesøy Bridge to Sommerøy which in turn is connected to the large island of Kvaløya and the rest of Norway by another bridge.

Hillesøya is an old church site, with the Hillesøy Church being located on the island for a long time, until it was moved to Brensholmen in 1889. Hillesøya was the namesake for the old Hillesøy Municipality that existed from 1855 until its dissolution in 1964.

There was a large forest fire on the island of Hillesøya in 2012 that was caused by an injured Canadian tourist attempting to light a signal fire.

== See also ==
- List of islands of Norway
