= Hillesøy Church =

- Hillesøy kirke
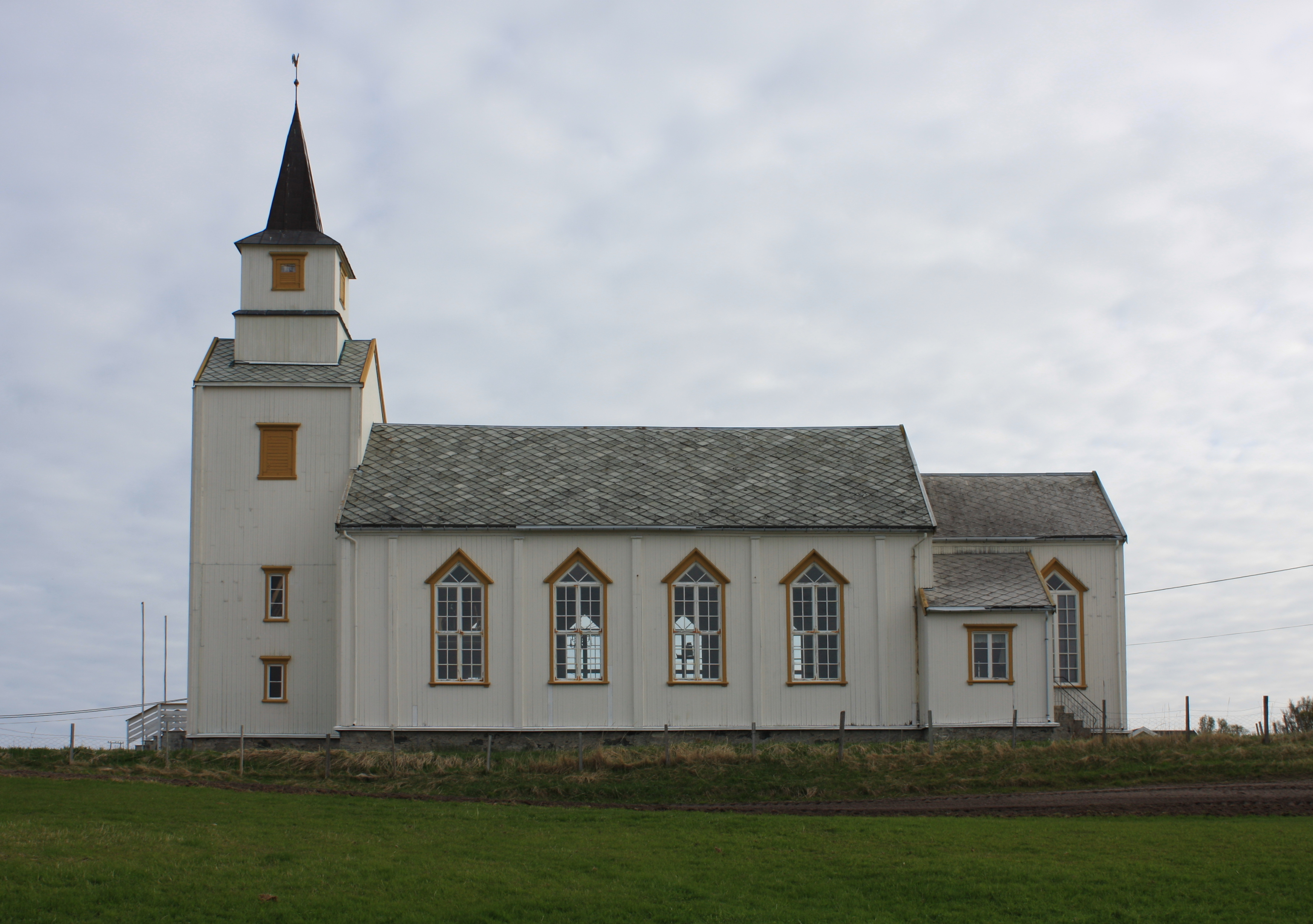
- View of the church
- Hillesøy Church
- 69.5981006°N 18.0317069°E
- Location: Tromsø Municipality, Troms
- Country: Norway
- Denomination: Church of Norway
- Churchmanship: Evangelical Lutheran

History
- Status: Parish church
- Founded: 13th century
- Consecrated: 1889

Architecture
- Functional status: Active
- Architect: D.G. Evjen
- Architectural type: Long church
- Completed: 1889 (137 years ago)

Specifications
- Capacity: 304
- Materials: Wood

Administration
- Diocese: Nord-Hålogaland
- Deanery: Tromsø domprosti
- Parish: Hillesøy
- Norwegian Cultural Heritage Site
- Type: Church
- Status: Listed
- ID: 84575

Hillesøy Church (Norwegian: Hillesøy kirke) is a parish church of the Church of Norway in Tromsø Municipality in Troms county, Norway. It is located in the Brensholmen area on the western part of the island of Kvaløya. It is the church for the Hillesøy parish which is part of the Tromsø domprosti (arch-deanery) in the Diocese of Nord-Hålogaland. The white, wooden church was built in a long church style in 1889 by the architect D.G. Evjen. The church seats about 300 people.

== History ==
The earliest existing historical records of the church date back to the year 1589, but the church is likely much older. The church was likely built here before the first church was built on the nearby island of Tromsøya in the early 1200s. Originally, Hillesøy Church was located on the island of Hillesøya, just west of Sommarøy, about 6 kilometres (3.7 mi) south of the present church site on Kvaløya island. The church was a wooden building with a cruciform floorplan where the main nave was about 38 by 16 metres (125 ft × 52 ft). By the 1700s, the old building was in quite poor condition. Around the year 1770, the old church was torn down and a new church was built on the same site. It was a timber-framed cruciform design. During the 1800s, a sacristy was built on the east end of the building and a tower with a steeple on the west end.

In the 1800s, the church seated about 150 people, but as time went on, the church became too small for the parish and it was decided to move the church to another location that was more central in the parish. A site at Brensholmen on the western coast of Kvaløya island was chosen. It was about 6 kilometres (3.7 mi) south of the old church site. In 1889, a new, larger church was built there and then the old church was torn down afterwards.

== Media gallery ==
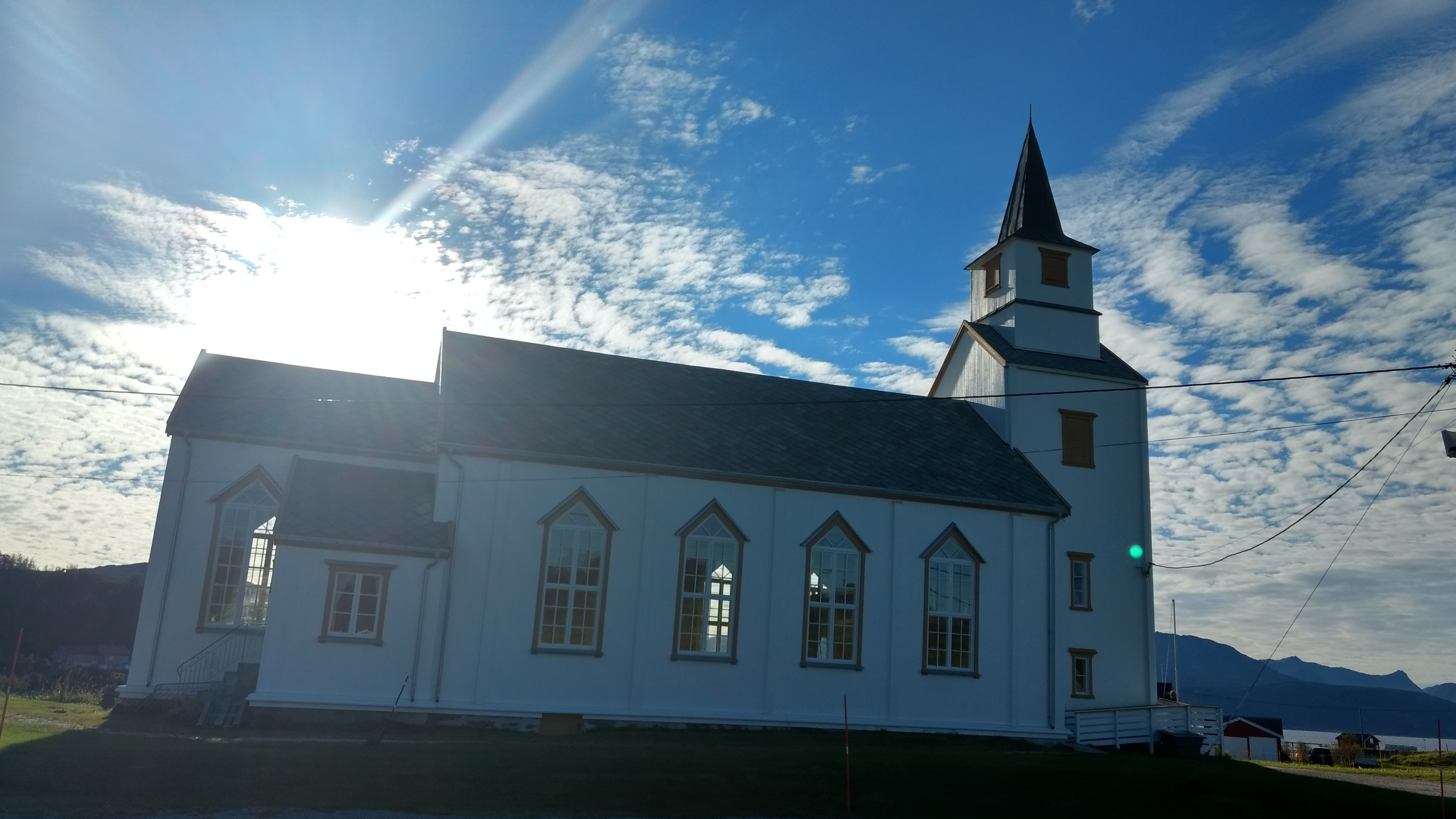

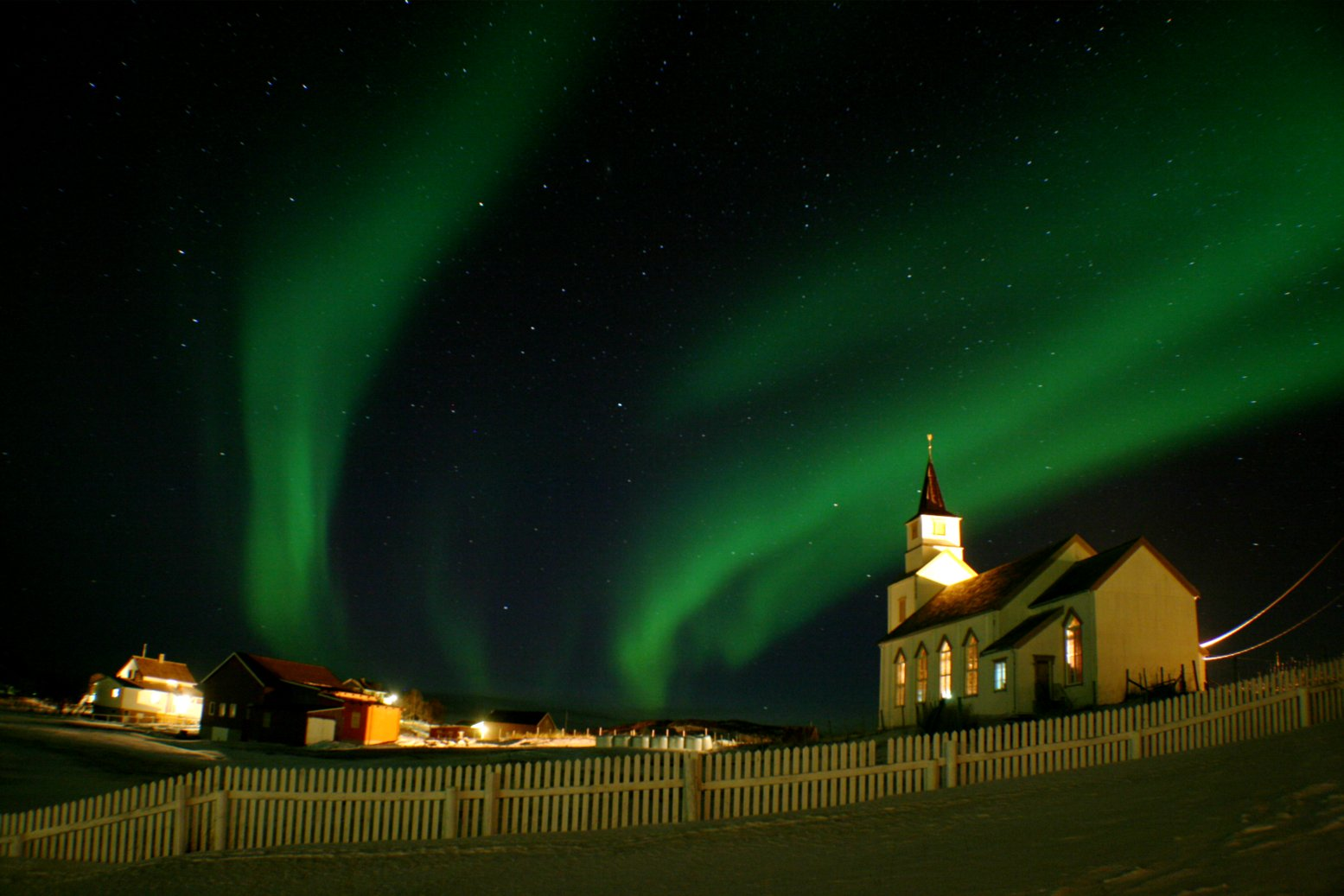

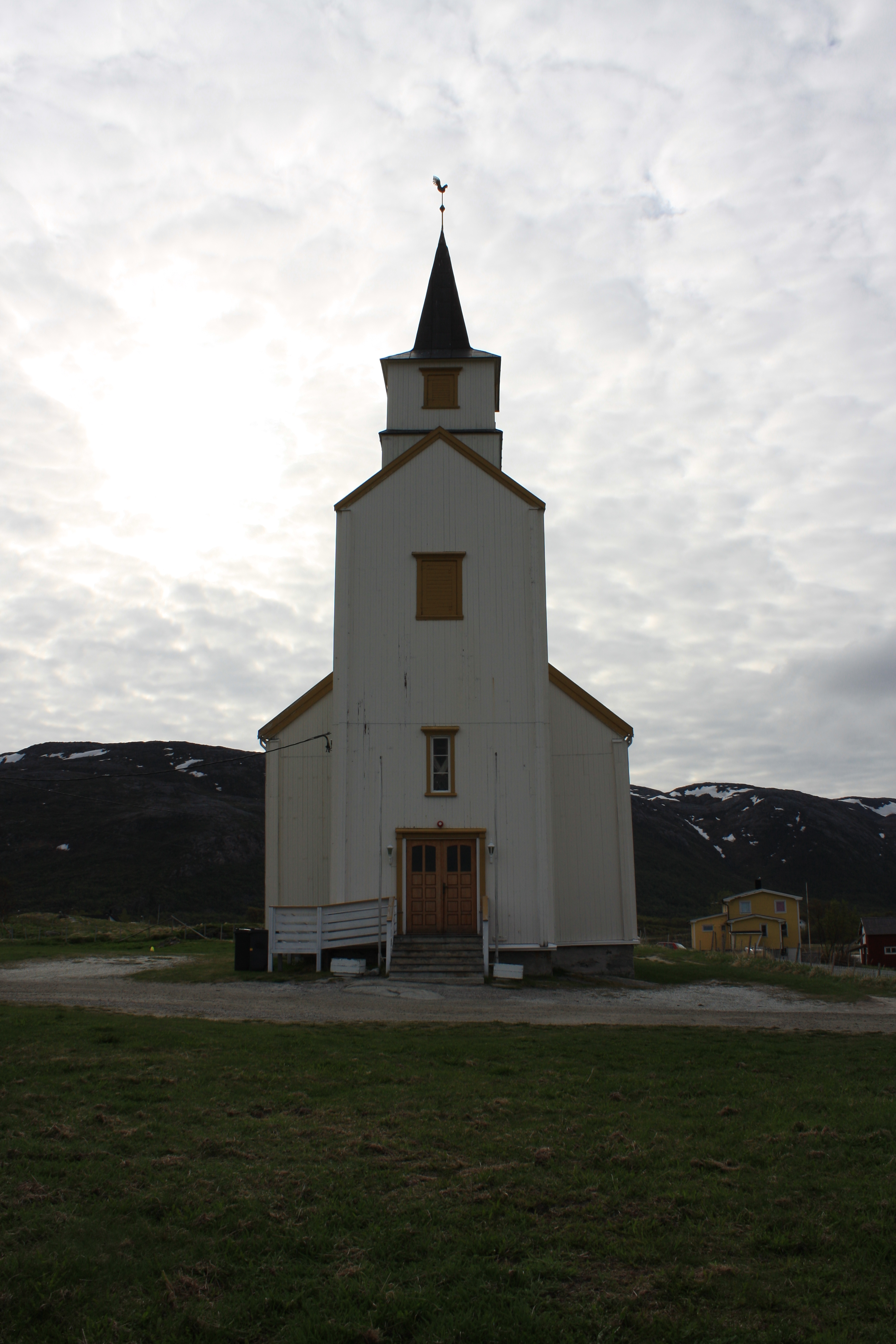

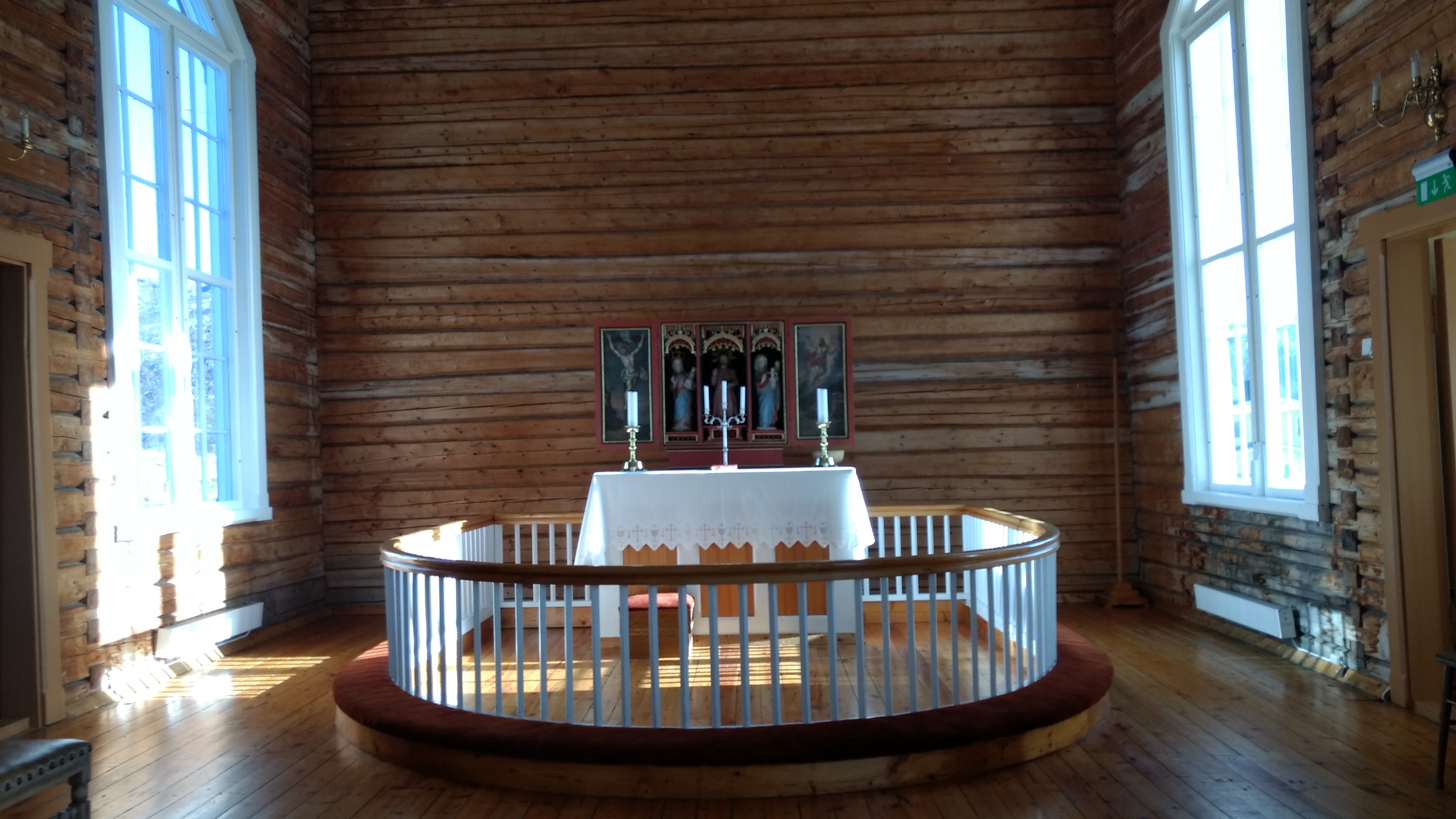

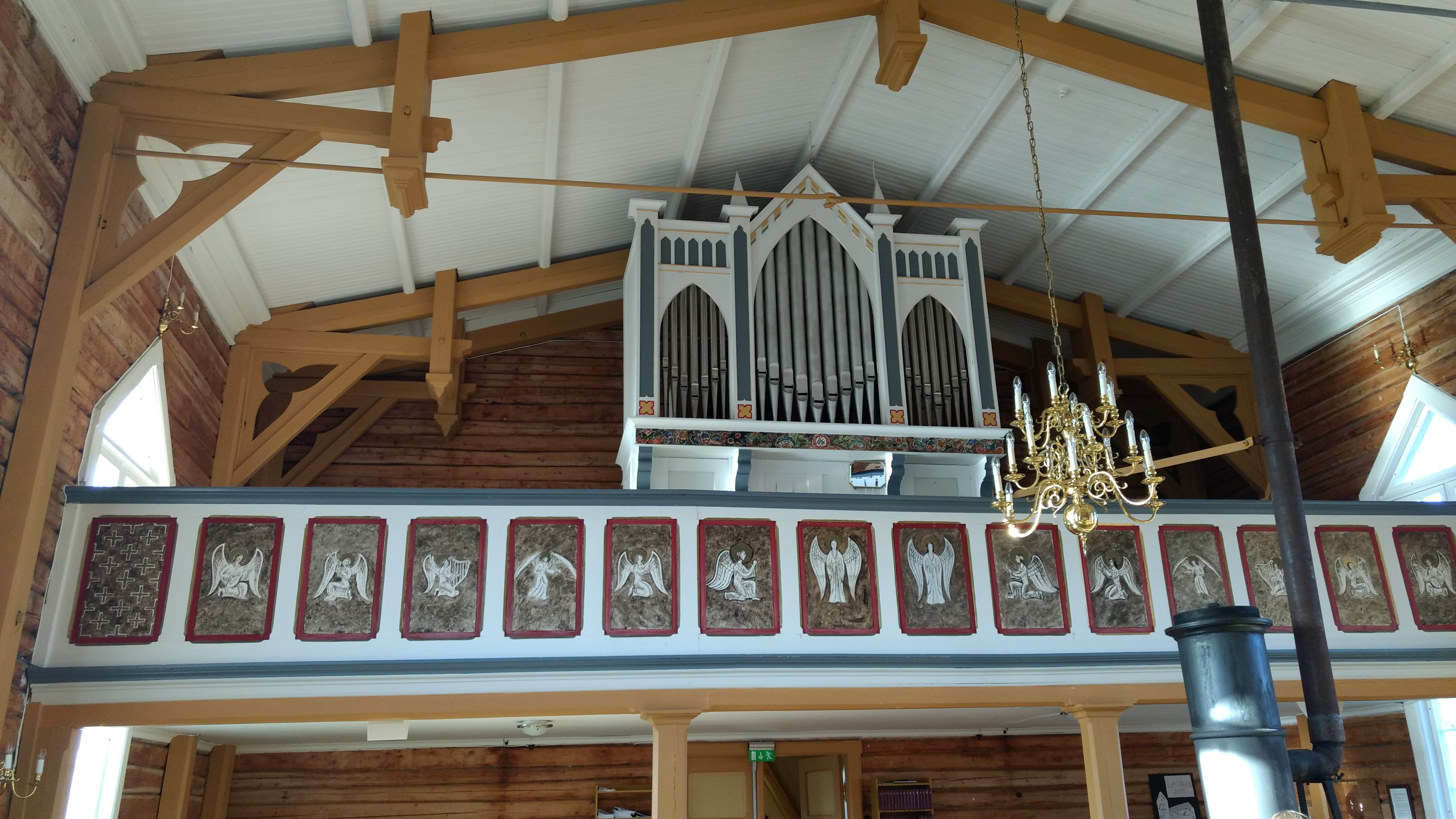

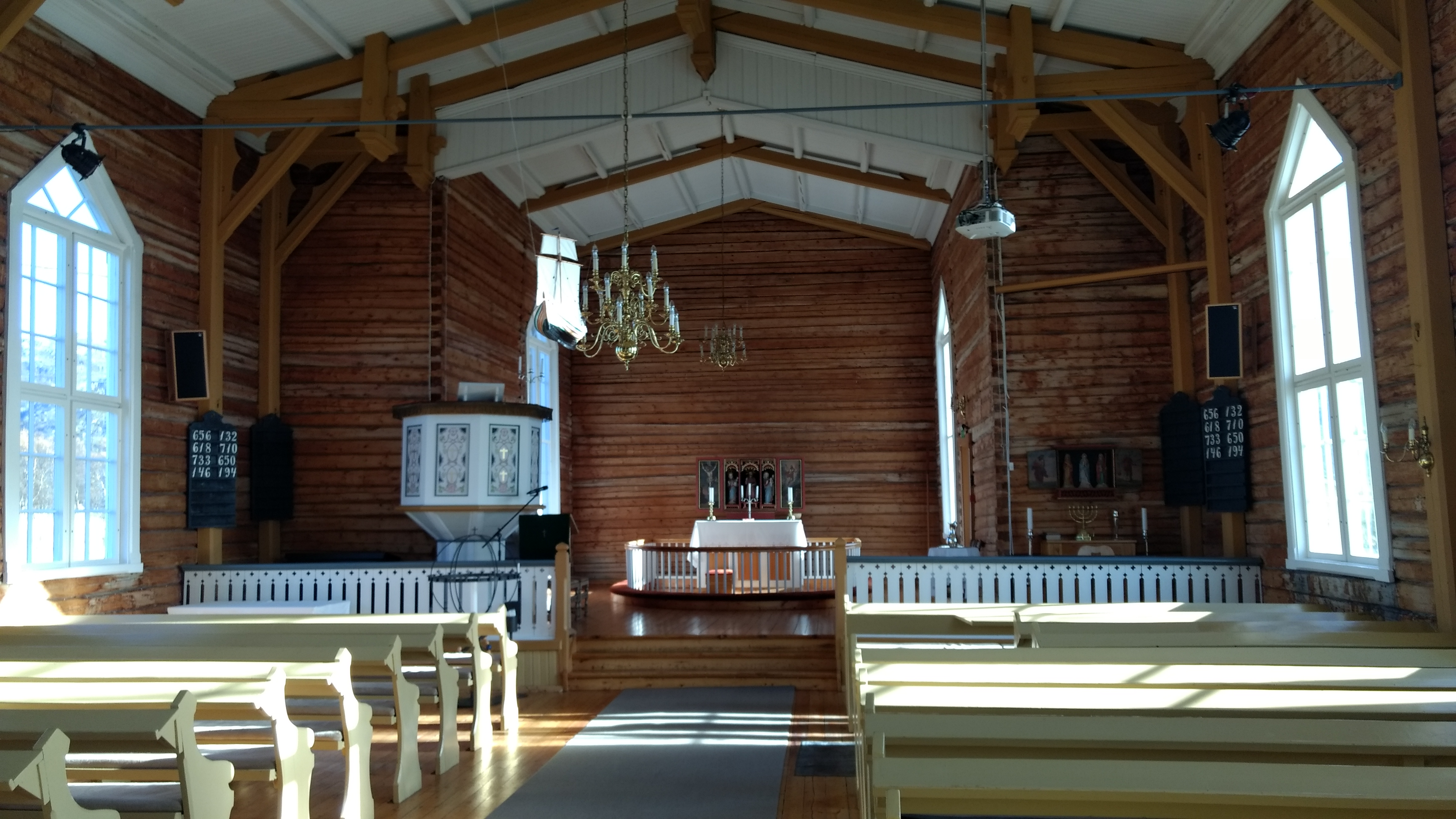

== See also ==
- List of churches in Nord-Hålogaland
