= Kvaløya (Tromsø) =

Island in Tromsø, Norway

Kvaløya (Norwegian) Sállir (Northern Sami)
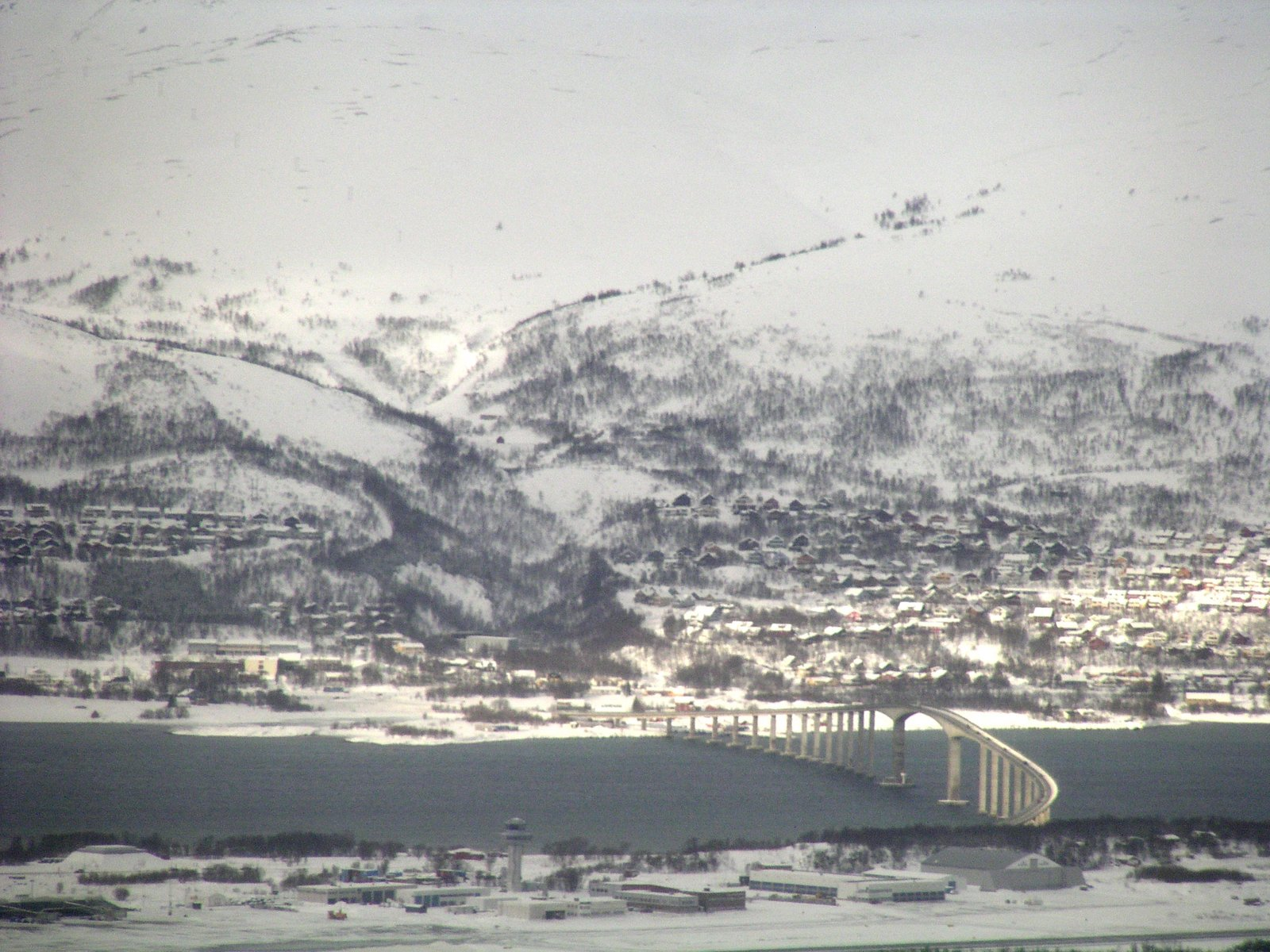
- Kvaløya seen from Tromsøya; the Sandnessund Bridge connects the two islands. (March 2006)
- Interactive map of Kvaløya (Norwegian); Sállir (Northern Sami)

Geography
- Location: Troms, Norway
- Coordinates: 69.5759°N 18.3665°E
- Area: 737 km^{2} (285 sq mi)
- Area rank: 5th in Norway
- Length: 46 km (28.6 mi)
- Width: 25 km (15.5 mi)
- Highest elevation: 1,044 m (3425 ft)
- Highest point: Store Blåmannen

Administration
- Norway
- County: Troms
- Municipality: Tromsø Municipality

Demographics
- Population: 13,030 (2018)
- Pop. density: 17.7/km^{2} (45.8/sq mi)

Kvaløya (Norwegian; lit. 'Whale Island') or Sállir (Northern Sami) is an island in Tromsø Municipality in Troms county, Norway. At 737 square kilometres (285 sq mi), it is the fifth largest island in mainland Norway. It is connected to the neighboring island of Tromsøya to the east by the Sandnessund Bridge, to the island of Ringvassøya to the north by the sub-sea Kvalsund Tunnel, to the small island of Sommarøya to the west by the Sommarøy Bridge, and to the mainland to the south by the Rya Tunnel. The island of Sommarøy, on the southwest coast, is a popular recreation area with magnificent coastal scenery.

== Geography ==
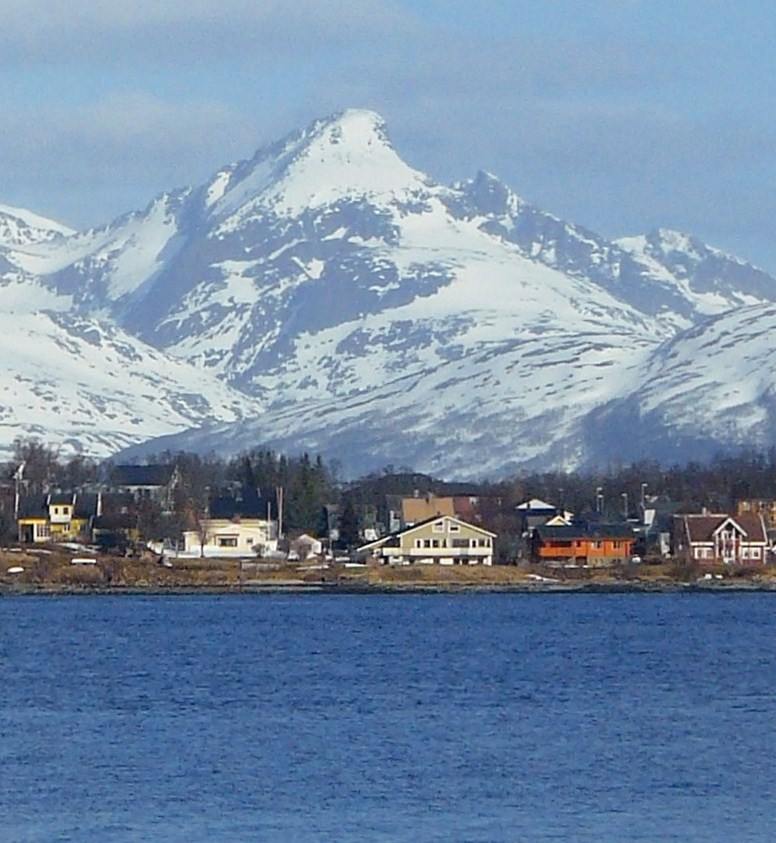
Store Blåmann 1,044 metres (3,425 ft); 4 May 2009.

Kvaløya is a mountainous island, with at least ten mountains higher than 700 metres (2,300 ft), and three reaching an elevation of more than 1,000 metres (3,300 ft). The tallest of these is Store Blåmann ("big blue man") at 1,044 metres (3,425 ft), which can be climbed without climbing equipment, although last part of the ascent is steep. There are also several small fjords, almost dividing the island in two or three parts: Kaldfjorden, Ersfjorden, and Kattfjorden.

The Rystraumen is a tidal current in the Straumsfjorden strait separating Kvaløya from the mainland to the south. Near this current, on the Kvaløya side, is Straumhella (30 kilometres or 19 miles from the city), a popular recreation area with good fishing opportunities.

Ryøya is an island in the midst of Rystraumen, formerly home to a small population of musk oxen that lived in the pine forest. The last musk ox, known as Alma, was discovered dead in 2013; an autopsy revealed that she had plastic in her stomach. Someone had left the rings of a beer six-pack behind on the island and Alma was found to have eaten them.

== Demography ==
Approximately 13,000 people live on Kvaløya, most of them on the eastern side near Kvaløysletta (which constitutes a suburban area of the city of Tromsø) near the Sandnessund Bridge.

== Climate ==
According to official climate statistics, the west coast of Kvaløya, facing the open ocean, is the warmest part of Tromsø municipality. The weather station at Sommarøy on the west coast has 24-hr averages of −1.9 °C (28.6 °F) in January, 11.9 °C (53.4 °F) in July and a mean annual temperature of 3.9 °C (39.0 °F), while annual precipitation is 940 millimetres (37 in).

== Media gallery ==
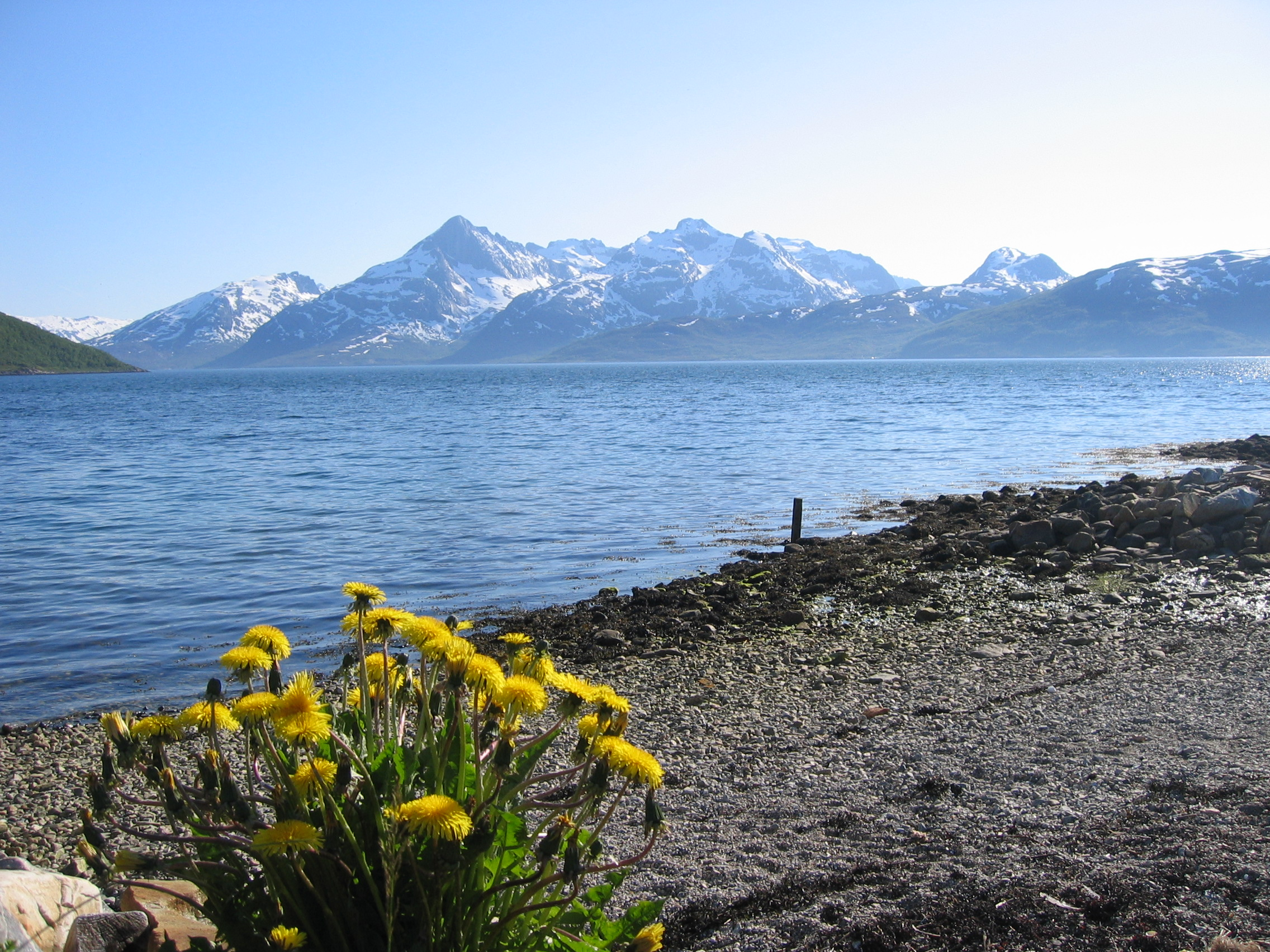
The mountains of Kvaløya seen from Skulsfjord

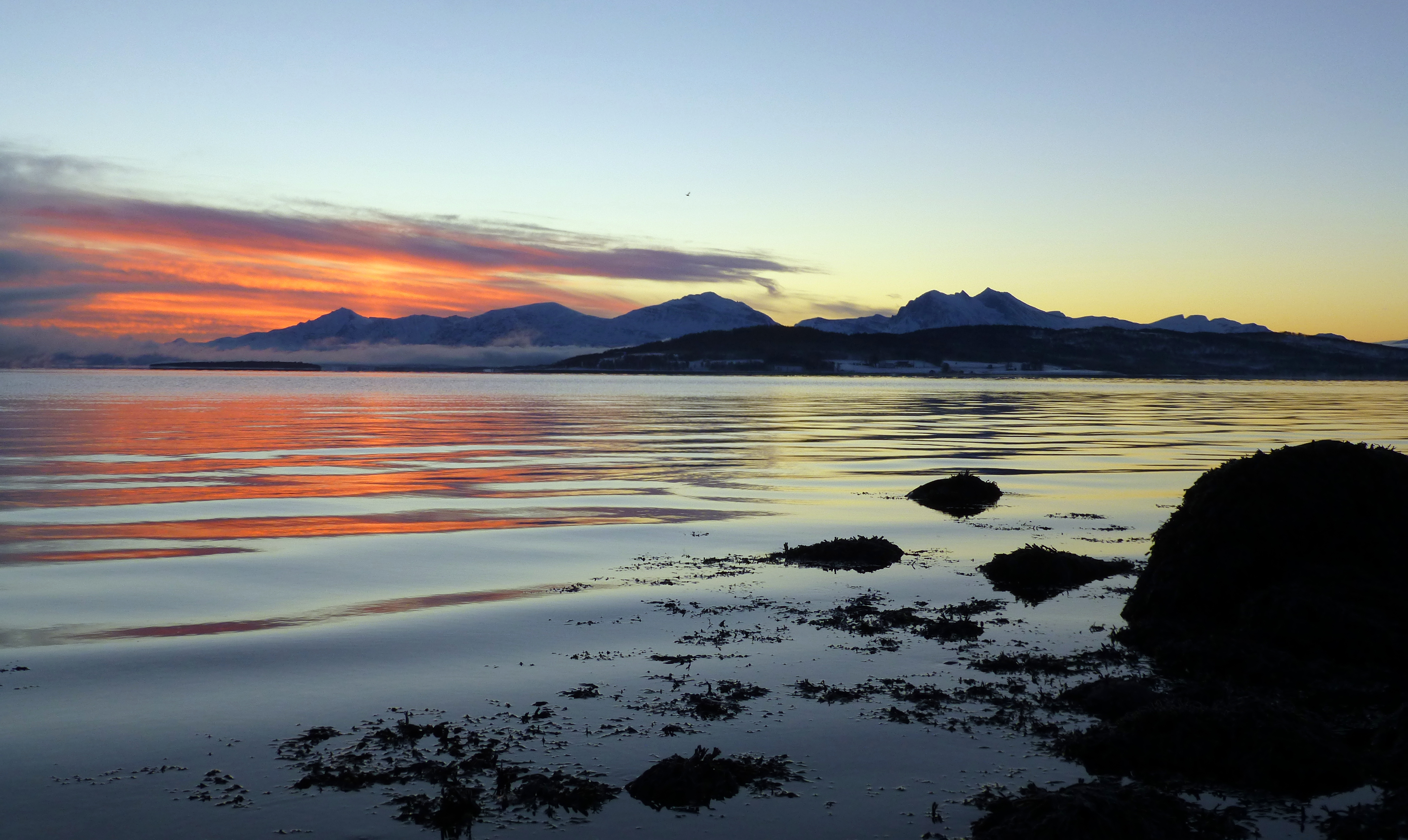
Midday twilight on Kvaløya in winter

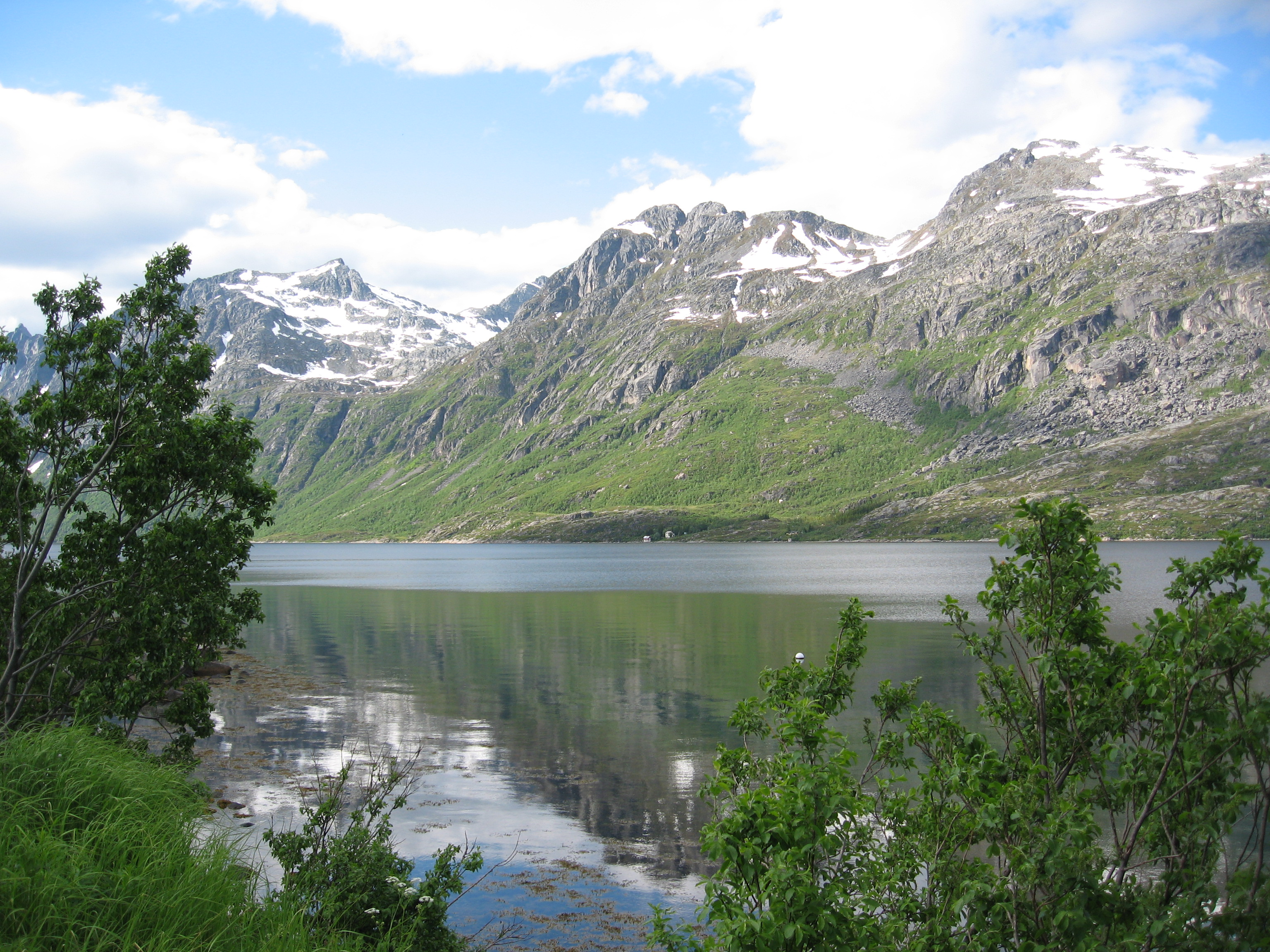
View of the Ersfjorden

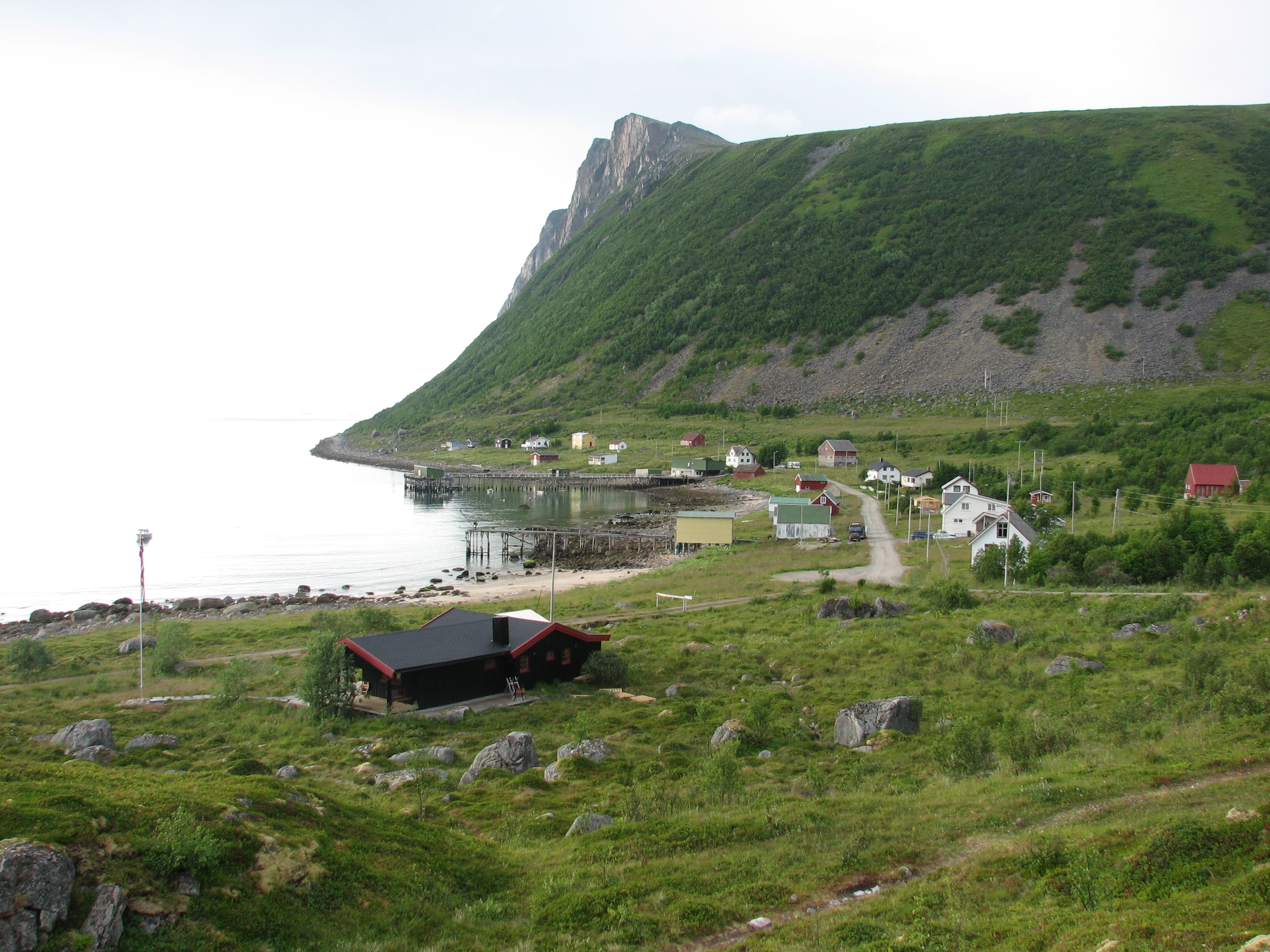
Rekvik village on Kvaløya

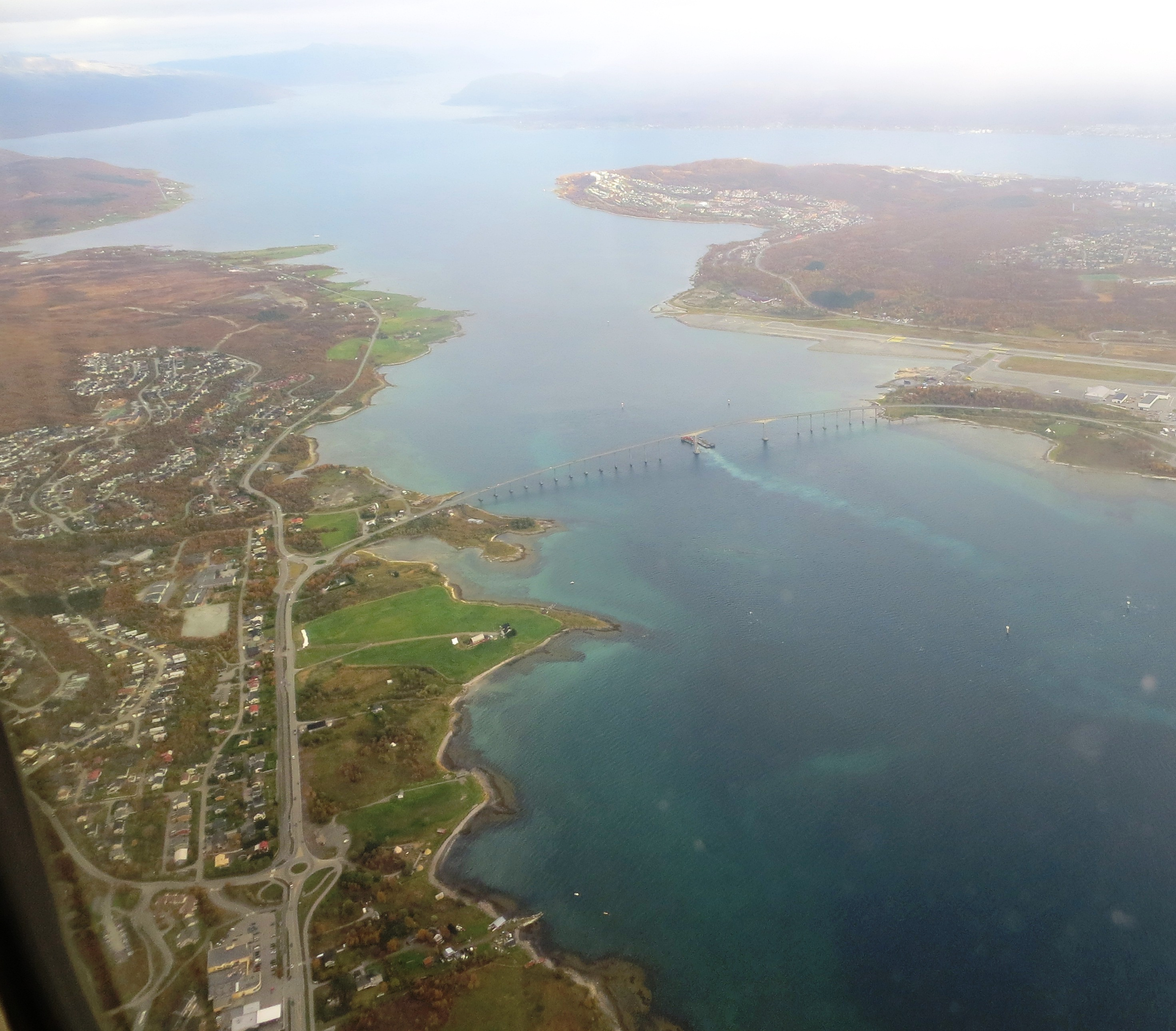
Tromsøya (right) and Kvaløya (left)

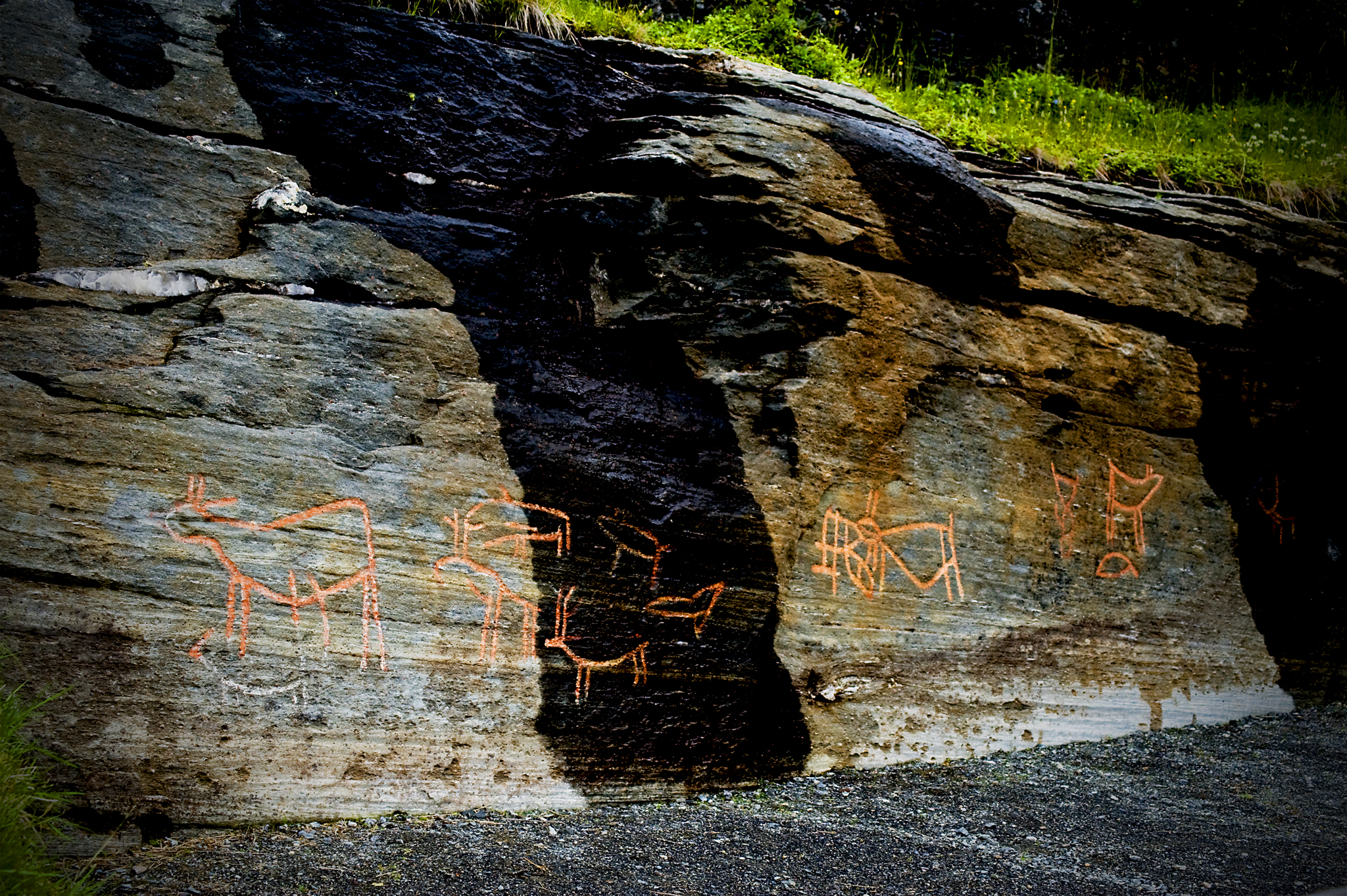
Rock carvings at Skavberget

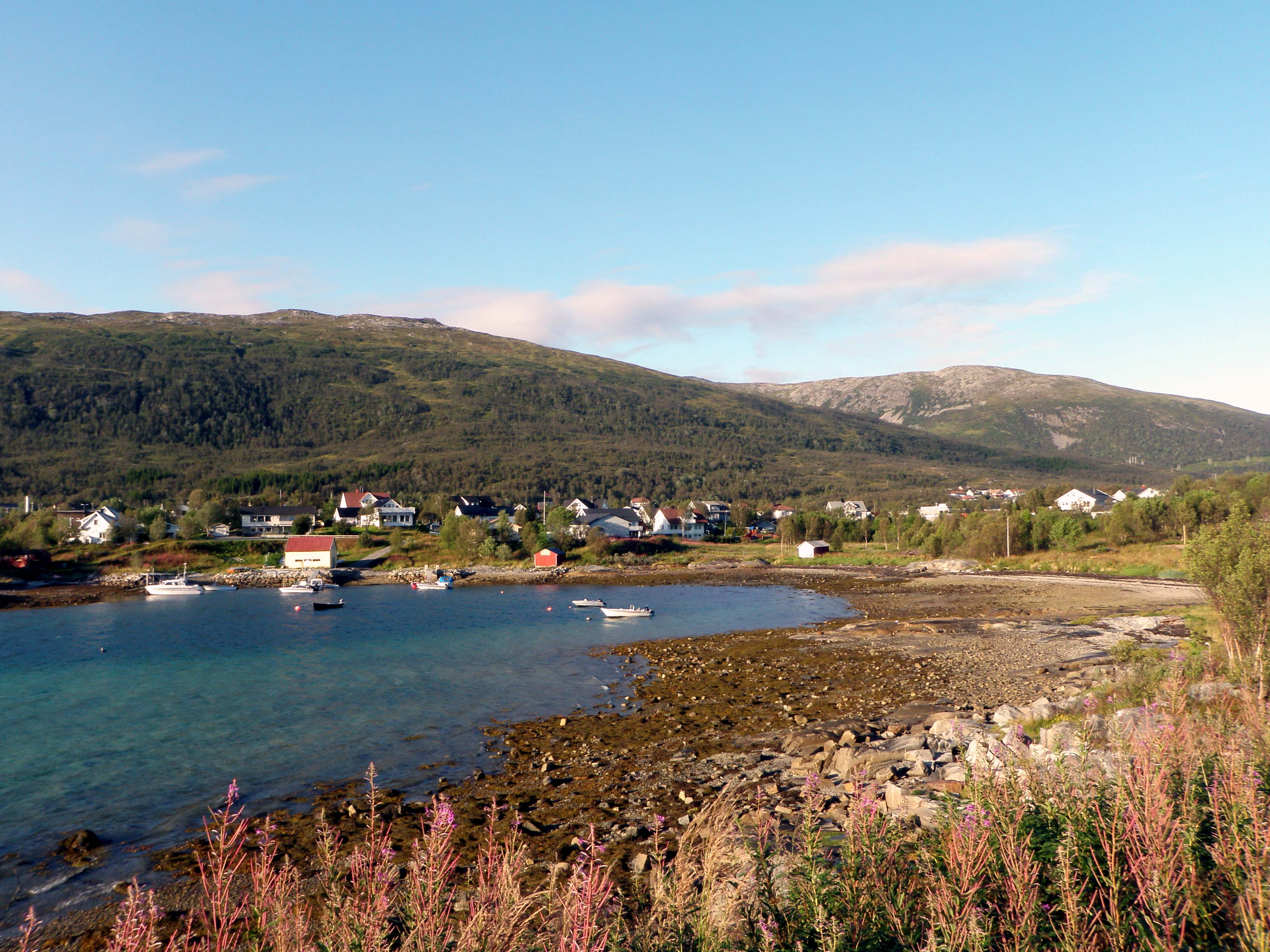
Village of Kaldfjord

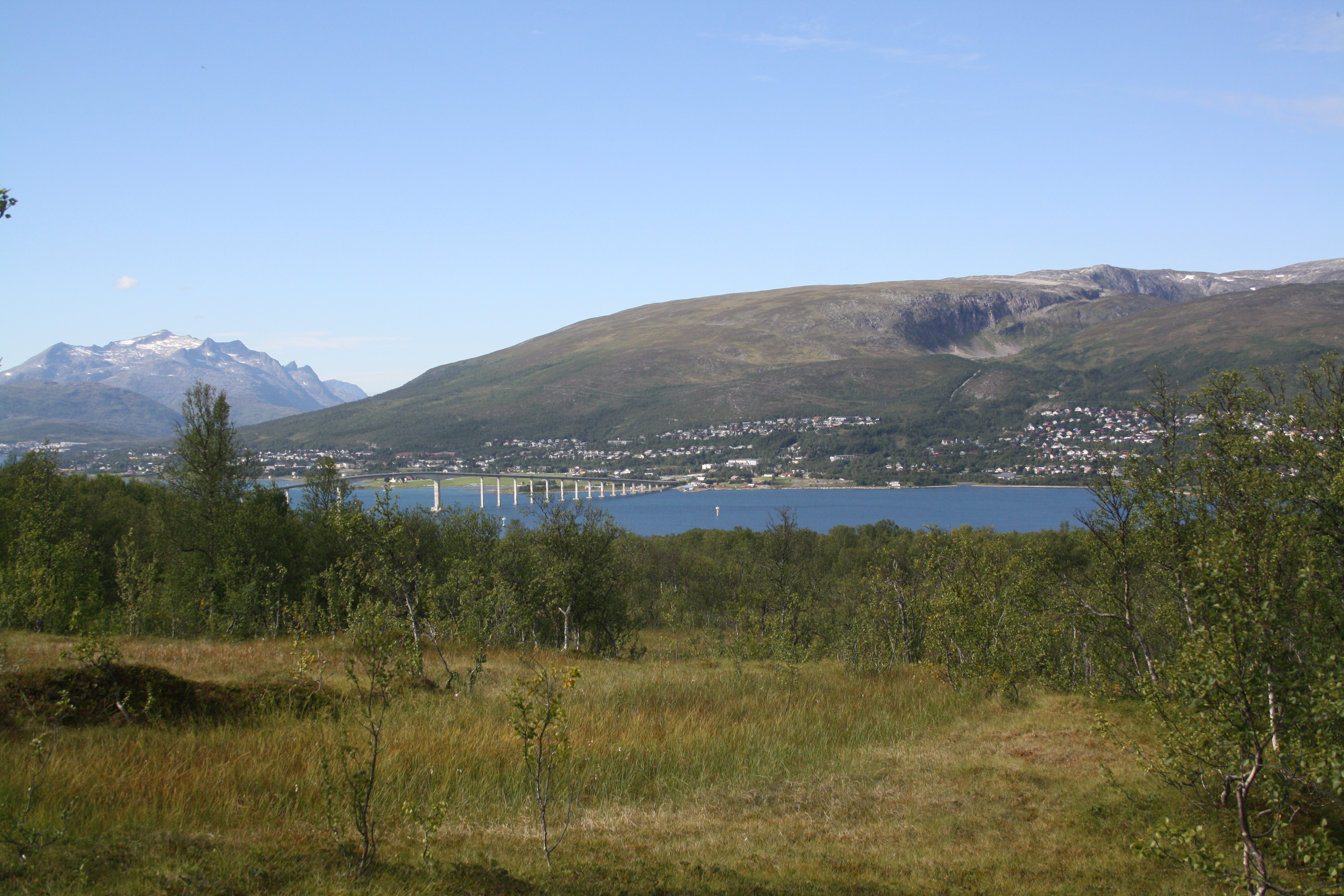
Kvaløysletta
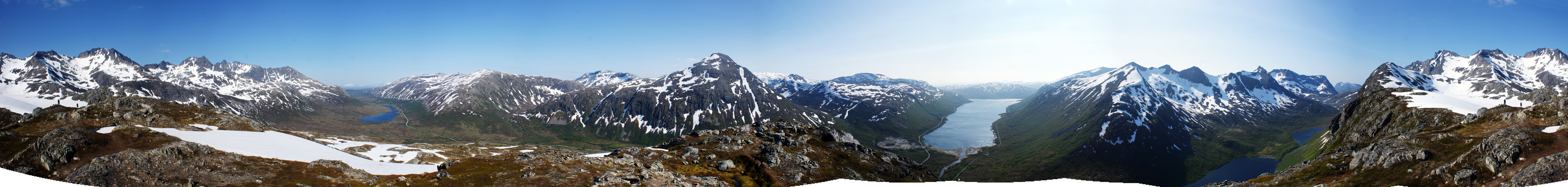
Panorama Middagstinden, 2011

== See also ==
- List of islands of Norway
