= Tromsøysund =

Tromsøysund may refer to:

== Places ==
- Tromsøysund Municipality, a former municipality in Troms county, Norway
- Tromsøysund Church (also known as the Arctic Cathedral), a church in Tromsø Municipality in Troms county, Norway
- Tromsøysundet, a strait in Tromsø Municipality in Troms county, Norway

== Other ==
- FK Tromsøysund, a football club in Tromsø Municipality in Troms county, Norway
- Tromsøysund Tunnel, an undersea road tunnel in Tromsø Municipality in Troms county, Norway
