= Sandnessund Bridge =

Road bridge over the Sandnes Strait in Norway

Sandnessund Bridge Sandnessundbrua
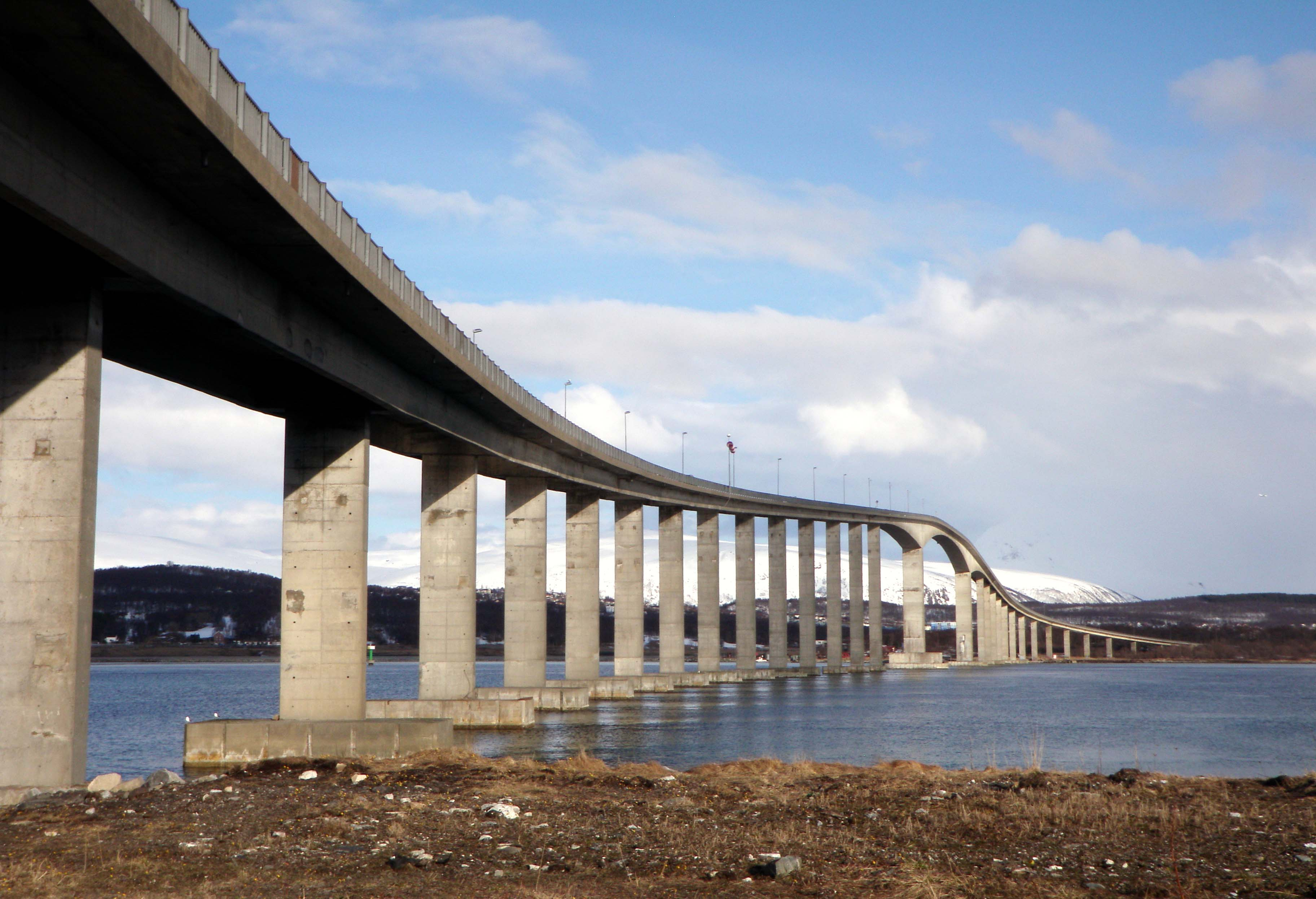
- View of the bridge
- Coordinates: 69°41′27.71″N 18°54′9.16″E
- Carries: Fv862
- Crosses: Sandnessundet
- Locale: Tromsø, Norway

Characteristics
- Material: Concrete
- Total length: 1,220 metres (4,000 ft)
- Longest span: 150 metres (490 ft)
- No. of spans: 36
- Clearance below: 41 metres (135 ft)

History
- Construction cost: 36 million kr
- Opened: 21 December 1973
- Inaugurated: 26 June 1974

Sandnessund Bridge (Norwegian: Sandnessundbrua) is a cantilever road bridge that crosses the Sandnes Strait between the islands of Tromsøya and Kvaløya in Tromsø Municipality in Troms county, Norway. The Tromsø Bridge, the Tromsøysund Tunnel, and this bridge are the three road connections into the city of Tromsø on the island of Tromsøya.

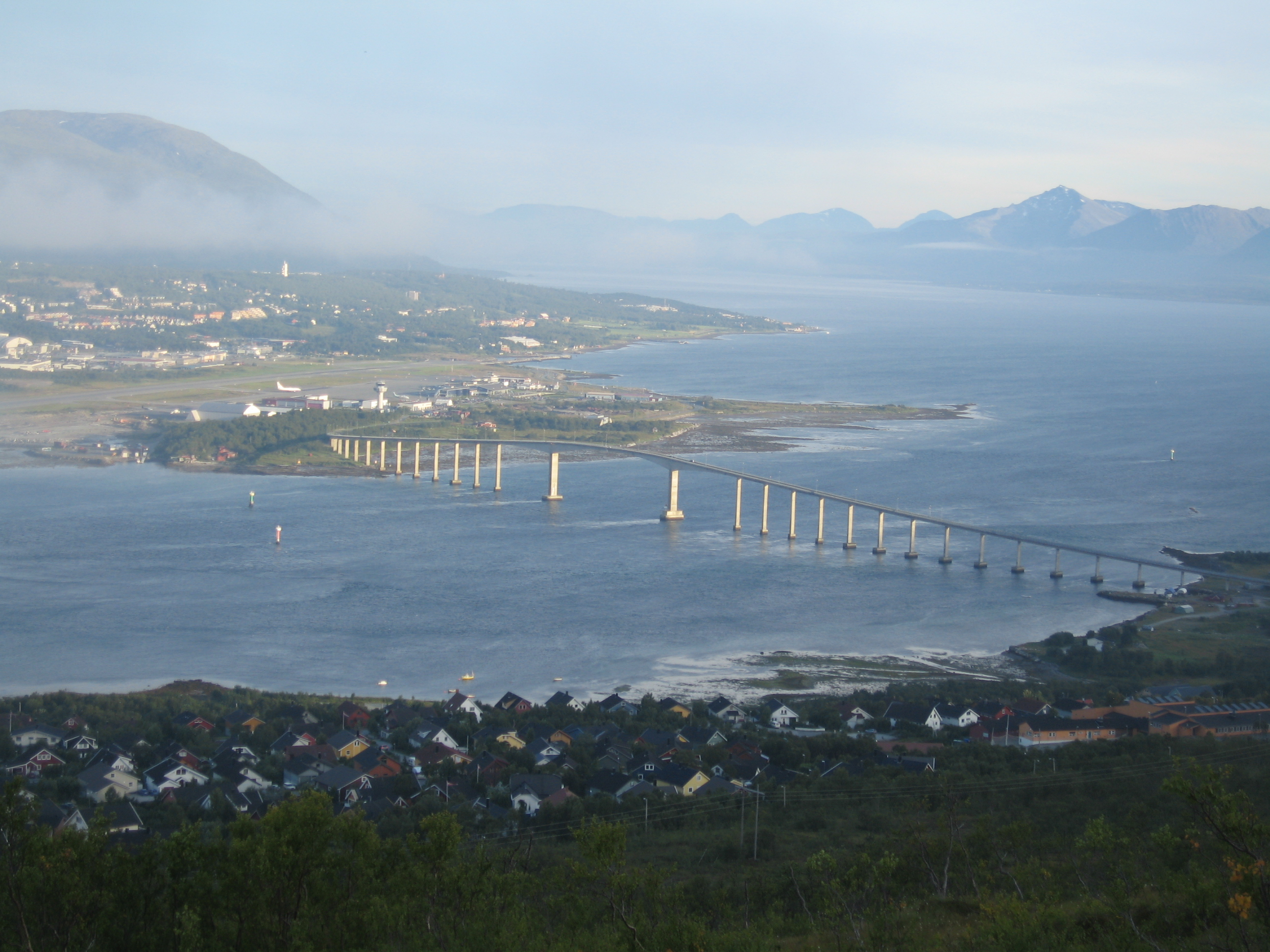
Overview of the bridge from the north, with Tromsø Airport in the background

The 1,220-metre (4,000 ft) Sandnessund Bridge was constructed out of concrete and it has 36 spans supporting it. The main span is 150 metres (490 ft) long and the maximum clearance to the sea below the bridge is 41 metres (135 ft). This bridge is part of Norwegian County Road 862. Sandnessund Bridge was officially opened by Crown Prince Harald on 26 June 1974, although it had already opened for traffic on 21 December 1973. The bridge cost 36 million kr. It was a toll bridge until 1 May 1982.

== See also ==
- List of bridges in Norway
- List of bridges in Norway by length
- List of bridges
- List of bridges by length
