= Sandneshamn =

Village in Tromsø Municipality, Norway

- Village
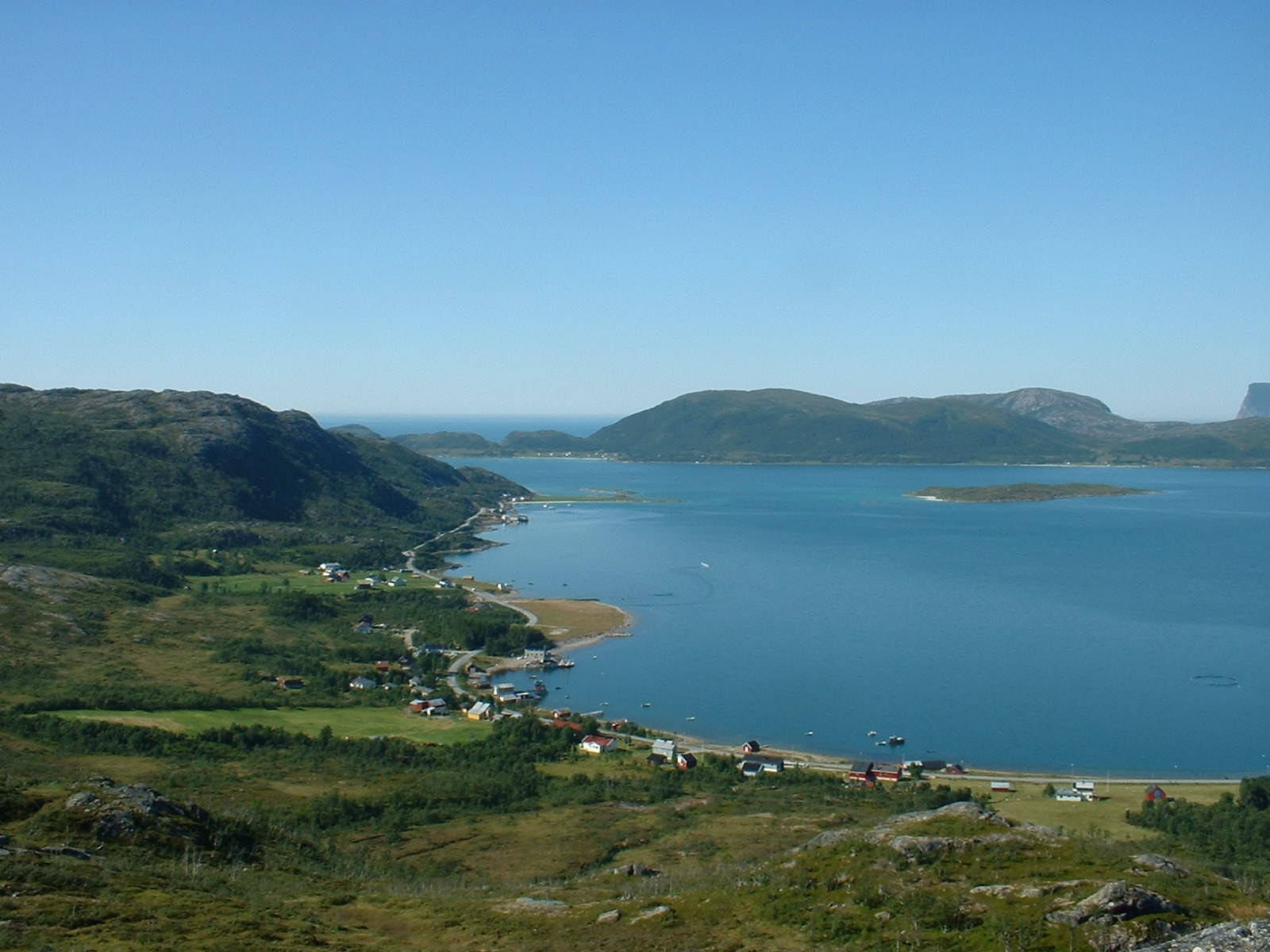
- View of the village
- Interactive map of Sandneshamn
- Location within Troms Location within Norway
- Coordinates: 69°37′48″N 18°10′10″E
- Country: Norway
- Region: Northern Norway
- County: Troms
- District: Midt-Troms
- Municipality: Tromsø Municipality
- Elevation: 5 m (16 ft)
- Time zone: UTC+01:00 (CET)
  - Summer (DST): UTC+02:00 (CEST)
- Post Code: 9108 Kvaløya

Sandneshamn is a village in Tromsø Municipality in Troms county, Norway. It is located on the western part of the island of Kvaløya along the Kattfjorden and Norwegian County Road 862, about 10 kilometres (6.2 mi) east of the village of Sommarøy. The village consists of an old 1930s house and several newer houses. The village is home to fish farming. The Otervik Tunnel is located immediately west of this village.
