= Grønnåsen Church =

- Grønnåsen kirke
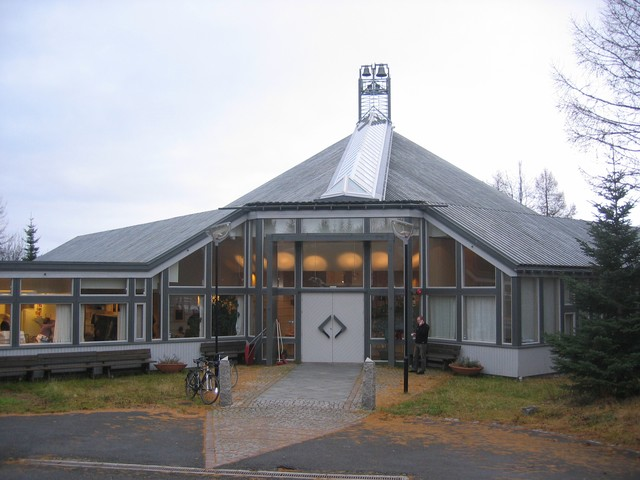
- View of the church
- Grønnåsen Church
- 69.6793158°N 18.960725°E
- Location: Tromsø Municipality, Troms
- Country: Norway
- Denomination: Church of Norway
- Churchmanship: Evangelical Lutheran

History
- Status: Parish church
- Founded: 1996
- Consecrated: 1996

Architecture
- Functional status: Active
- Architect(s): E. Hallset and K. Ragnarsdottir
- Architectural type: Fan-shaped
- Completed: 1996 (30 years ago)

Specifications
- Capacity: 450
- Materials: Wood

Administration
- Diocese: Nord-Hålogaland
- Deanery: Tromsø domprosti
- Parish: Grønnåsen

Grønnåsen Church (Norwegian: Grønnåsen kirke) is a parish church of the Church of Norway in Tromsø Municipality in Troms county, Norway. It is located in the Breivika area in the northern part of the city of Tromsø on the island of Tromsøya. It is the church for the Grønnåsen parish which is part of the Tromsø domprosti (arch-deanery) in the Diocese of Nord-Hålogaland. The gray, wooden church was built in a fan-shaped style in 1996 using designs drawn up by the architects E. Hallset and K. Ragnarsdottir. The church seats about 450 people.

== See also ==
- List of churches in Nord-Hålogaland
