= Oldervik, Troms =

Village in Tromsø Municipality, Norway

Oldervik (Norwegian); Leaibbáš (Northern Sami)
- Village
- Interactive map of: Oldervik (Norwegian); Leaibbáš (Northern Sami)
- Location within Troms Location within Norway
- Coordinates: 69°45′24″N 19°40′33″E
- Country: Norway
- Region: Northern Norway
- County: Troms
- District: Midt-Troms
- Municipality: Tromsø Municipality
- Elevation: 4 m (13 ft)
- Time zone: UTC+01:00 (CET)
  - Summer (DST): UTC+02:00 (CEST)
- Post Code: 9034 Oldervik

Oldervik (Norwegian) or Leaibbáš (Northern Sami) is a fishing village in Tromsø Municipality in Troms county, Norway, about 40 kilometres (25 mi) northeast of the city of Tromsø. It is located in a deep valley where the river Oldervikelva discharges into the Ullsfjorden, between two mountains that are both about 900 metres (3,000 ft) in elevation. The Grøtsundet strait leading to the city of Tromsø joins the Ullsfjorden, just north of the village. The population of Oldervik (2001) is 131 people.
