= Store Fornestinden =

Mountain in Troms, Norway

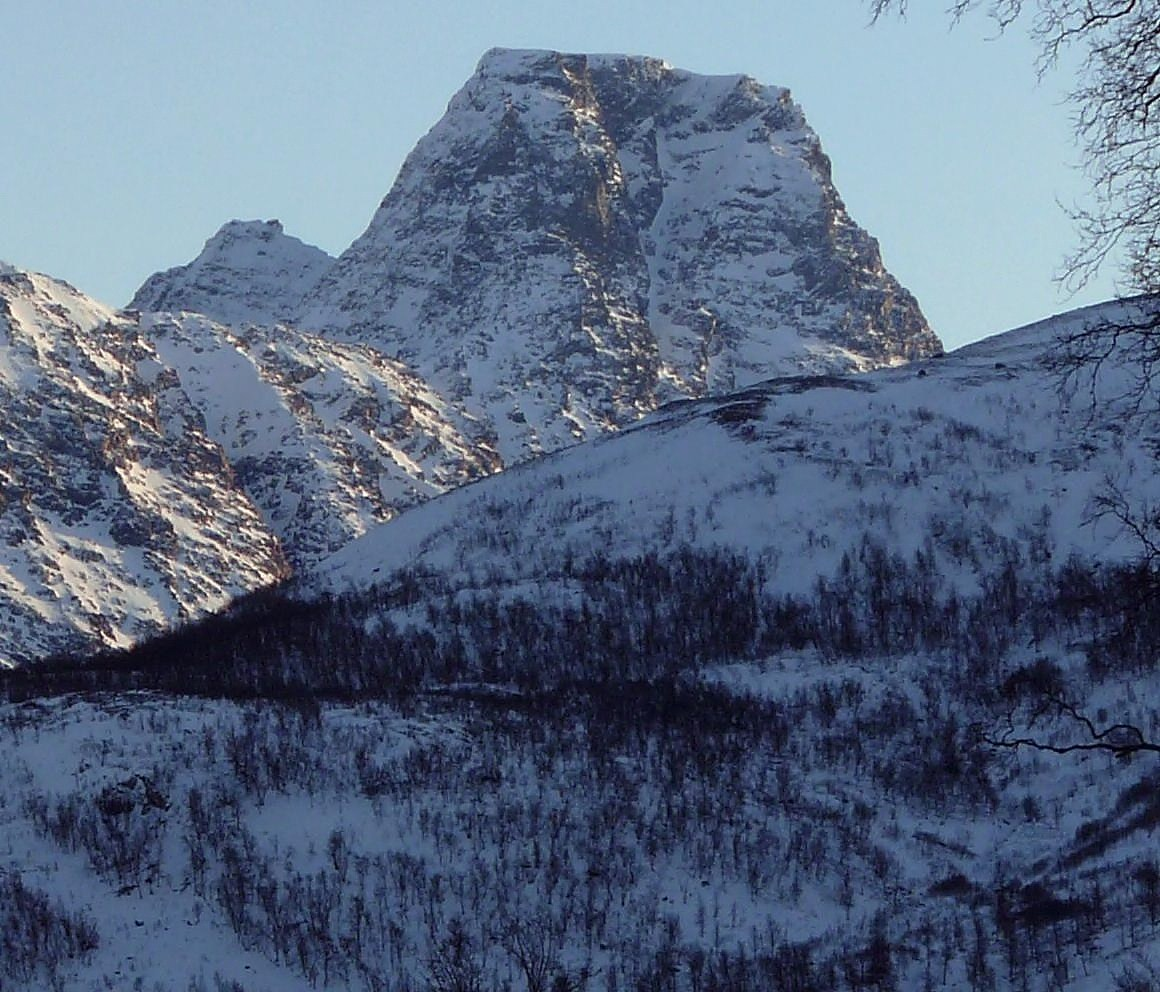
- West face of Store Fornestinden as seen from Jøvik

Highest point
- Elevation: 1,477 m (4,846 ft)
- Coordinates: 69.5651°N 19.9283°E

Geography
- Interactive map of the mountain
- Location: Troms, Norway
- Parent range: Lyngen Alps

Climbing
- First ascent: 3 August 1898 by Geoffrey Hastings, William C. Slingsby and Walter Perry Haskett-Smith

Store Fornestinden is a mountain in Tromsø Municipality in Troms county, Norway. The highest peak of any mountain in the eastern part of the municipality. The 1,477-metre (4,846 ft) tall mountain lies about 40 kilometres (25 mi) east of the city of Tromsø and about 11 kilometres (6.8 mi) west of the village of Lyngseidet in the neighboring Lyngen Municipality. The mountain is on the southern shore of the Kjosen fjord, an arm of the large Ullsfjorden.

The mountain consists of two peaks, the highest being Store Fornestinden at 1,477 metres (4,846 ft). The second peak named Litle Fornestinden, is slightly more northerly with a height of 1,050 metres (3,440 ft). The mountain is located in the Lyngen Alps, part of the Scandinavian Mountains.
