= Melvika =

Village in Tromsø Municipality, Norway

Melvika: Melvika (Norwegian); Sáddá (Northern Sami); Mjølvik (historic name)
- Village
- Interactive map of Melvika
- Location within Troms Location within Norway
- Coordinates: 70.0330°N 18.5596°E
- Country: Norway
- Region: Northern Norway
- County: Troms
- District: Hålogaland
- Municipality: Tromsø Municipality
- Elevation: 1 m (3.3 ft)
- Time zone: UTC+01:00 (CET)
  - Summer (DST): UTC+02:00 (CEST)
- Post Code: 9141 Mjølvik

Melvika (Norwegian; historically: Mjølvik) or Sáddá (Northern Sami) is a small, isolated fishing village in Tromsø Municipality in Troms county, Norway. The small village lies on the southeast side of the island of Sandøya, about 45 kilometres (28 mi) northwest of the city of Tromsø. The large island of Rebbenesøya lies about 4 kilometres (2.5 mi) to the east of the village. The village (and island) is only accessible by boat. There is a ferry that stops at the village three times each week (as of 2017). There are three residents in the village.
