= Tromsdalen =

Neighborhood in Tromsø, Norway

Tromsdalen (Norwegian); Romssavággi (Northern Sami); Sálašvággi (Northern Sami)
- Part of the city of Tromsø
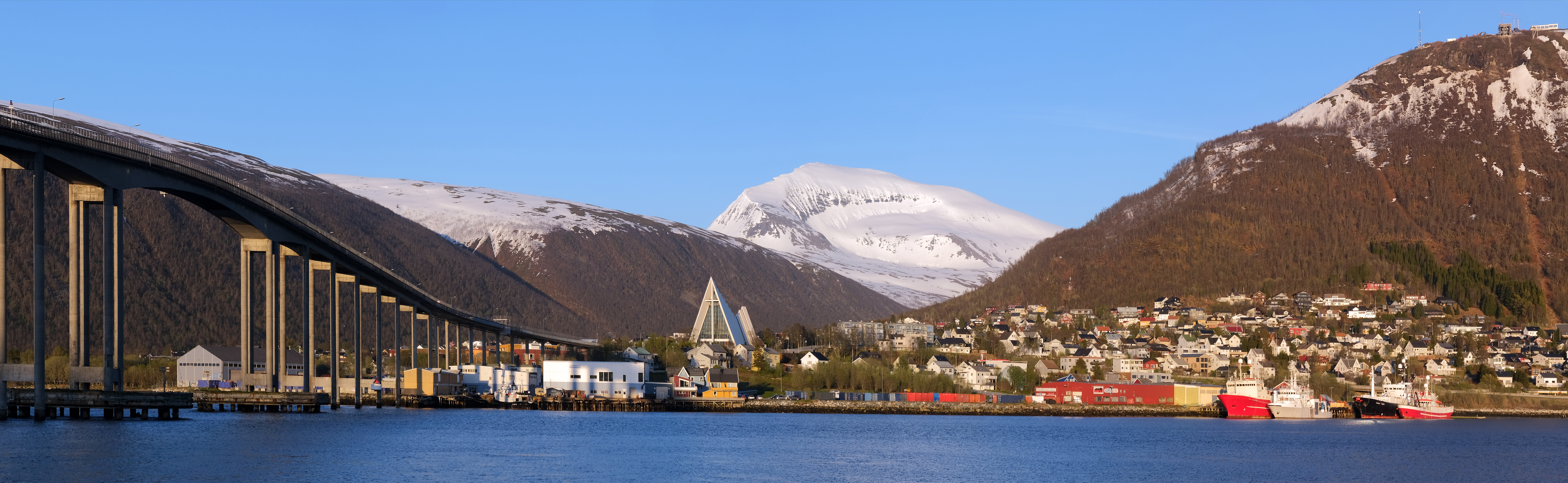
- View of the Tromsdalen area
- Interactive map of: Tromsdalen (Norwegian); Romssavággi (Northern Sami)
- Location within Troms Location within Norway
- Coordinates: 69.6442°N 18.9992°E
- Country: Norway
- Region: Northern Norway
- County: Troms
- District: Hålogaland
- Municipality: Tromsø Municipality

Area
  - Total: 5.13 km^{2} (1.98 sq mi)
- Elevation: 47 m (154 ft)

Population (2023)
  - Total: 18,202
  - Density: 3,548/km^{2} (9,190/sq mi)
- Time zone: UTC+01:00 (CET)
  - Summer (DST): UTC+02:00 (CEST)
- Post Code: 9020 Tromsdalen

Tromsdalen (Norwegian) or Romssavággi (Northern Sami) is an urban neighborhood in the city of Tromsø which is in Tromsø Municipality in Troms county, Norway. It is located just to the east of the city centre on the mainland along the coast of the Tromsøysundet strait. The 5.13-square-kilometre (1,270-acre) village has a population (2023) of 18,202 and a population density of 3,548 inhabitants per square kilometre (9,190/sq mi).

The urban area encompasses a good portion of the valley in which it is located. Tromsdalen, which literally means Troms valley, is connected to the island of Tromsøya by the Tromsø Bridge. The European route E8 highway runs through the northern part of Tromsdalen. The Tromsdalselva river flows through the valley. The Arctic Cathedral is located here.

Popular attractions in Tromsdalen are the Arctic Cathedral and the Fjellheisen aerial tramway to the top of a nearby fell; the tramway ends at an elevation of 420 metres (1,380 ft) where the view is stunning. The mountain Tromsdalstinden is located at the eastern end of Tromsdalen and reaches an elevation of 1,238 metres (4,062 ft). The climb to the top of this mountain is very popular with the Tromsø residents, since mountain climbing equipment is not needed.
