= Jøvik Chapel =

- Jøvik kapell
- Jøvik Chapel
- 69.604967°N 19.833171°E
- Location: Tromsø Municipality, Troms
- Country: Norway
- Denomination: Church of Norway
- Churchmanship: Evangelical Lutheran

History
- Status: Chapel
- Founded: 1976
- Consecrated: 1976

Architecture
- Functional status: Active
- Architectural type: Long church
- Completed: 1920 (106 years ago)

Specifications
- Capacity: 100
- Materials: Wood

Administration
- Diocese: Nord-Hålogaland
- Deanery: Tromsø domprosti
- Parish: Ullsfjord

Jøvik Chapel (Norwegian: Jøvik kapell) is a chapel of the Church of Norway in Tromsø Municipality in Troms county, Norway. It is located in the village of Jøvik, along the Kjosen fjord, an arm off the main Ullsfjorden. It is an annex chapel for the Ullsfjord parish which is part of the Tromsø domprosti (arch-deanery) in the Diocese of Nord-Hålogaland. The white, wooden chapel was originally built as a school. The school closed in 1960. In 1976, the building was converted into a chapel after a renovation into a long church style chapel. The chapel seats about 100 people.

== See also ==
- List of churches in Nord-Hålogaland
