= Norwegian County Road 862 =

Norwegian county road in Troms county

County Road 862

Route information
- Length: 115.6 km (71.8 mi)

Major junctions
- South end: Fv86 at Straumsbotn
- Fv86 at Straumsbotn; Fv855 at Finnfjordbotn; Fv861 at Silsand; Fv860 at Islandsbotn; Rv862 at Straumsbotn
- North end: E8 Hungeren

Location
- Country: Norway
- Counties: Troms

Highway system
- Roads in Norway; National Roads; County Roads
← Fv861	→ Fv863

County Road 862 (Norwegian: Fylkesvei 862) is a Norwegian county road in Troms county, Norway. The road is 115.6 kilometers (71.8 mi) long and it runs between the village of Straumsbotn in Senja Municipality and the city of Tromsø in Tromsø Municipality. Part of the route is one of eighteen designated National Tourist Routes in Norway. The Tromsø Bridge and Sandnessund Bridge are both located on the route.
