= Thomas Eidem =

Norwegian politician (1859–?)

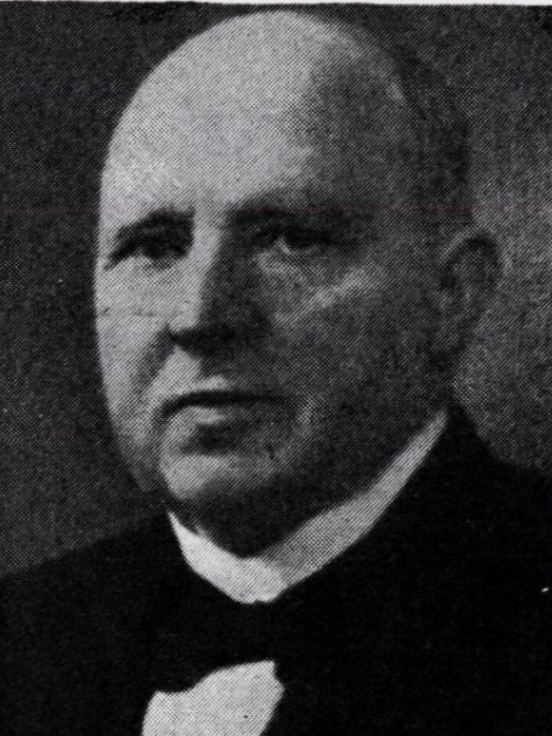
- Bastian Thomas Lauritz Eidem (1859–1954), Norwegian politician (Liberal party)
- Born: Bastian Thomas Laurits Eidem; 31 January 1859; Sykkylven, Norway
- Occupations: Schoolteacher; Politician

Bastian Thomas Laurits Eidem (born 31 January 1859) was a Norwegian schoolteacher and politician.

He was born in Sykkylven Municipality (it was part of Ørskog Municipality at that time) to farmer Johannes Bastiansen Eidem and Brit Trulsdotter. He was elected representative to the Storting for the periods 1913–1915, 1916–1918 and 1925–1927, for the Liberal Party. He served as mayor of Tromsø Municipality from 1900 to 1904, in 1906 and from 1910 to 1913. He was appointed borgermester of Tromsø from 1919 to 1926.
