= Tromsø Bridge =

Road bridge in Tromsø Municipality in Troms county, Norway

Tromsø Bridge Tromsøbrua
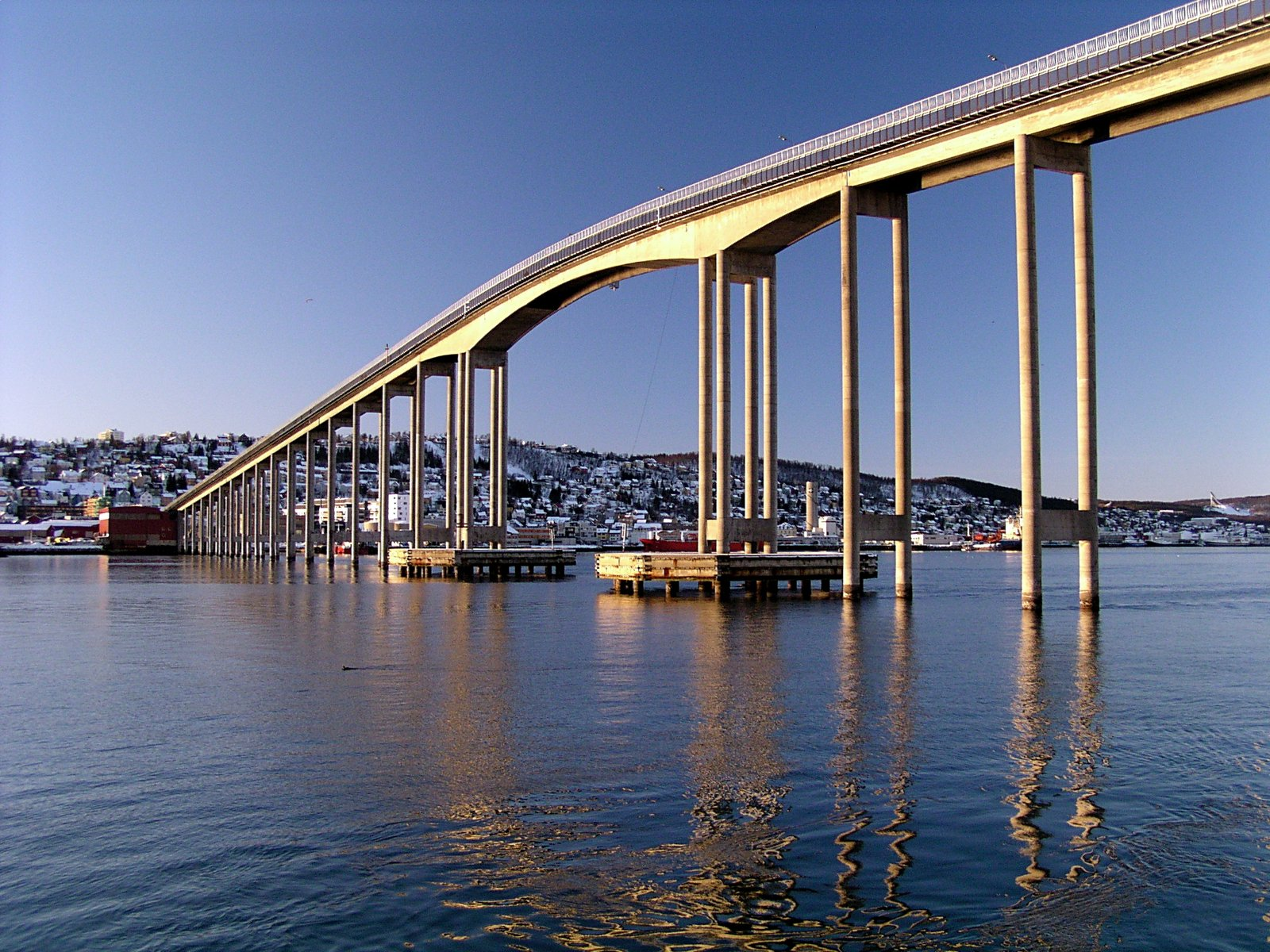
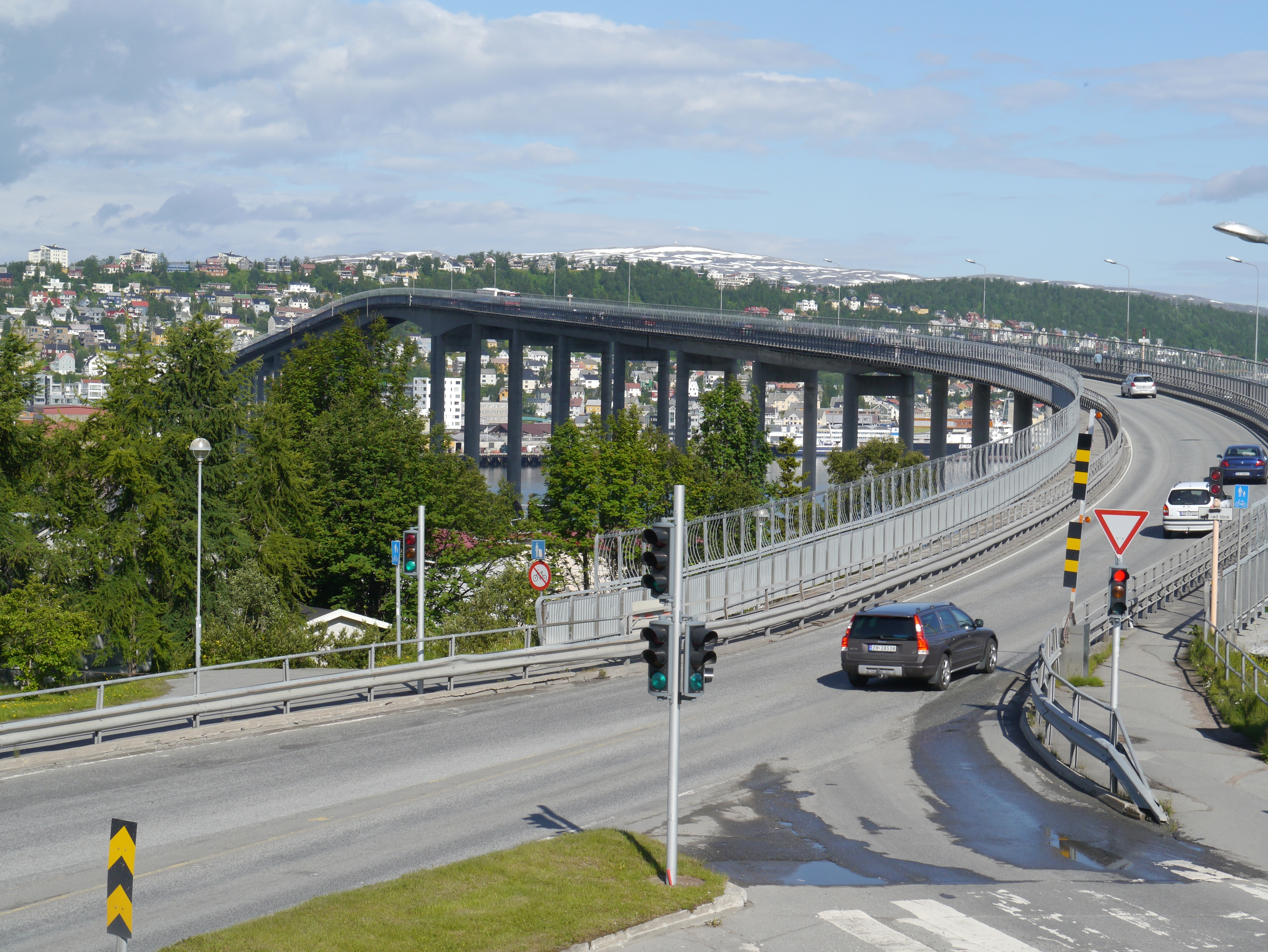
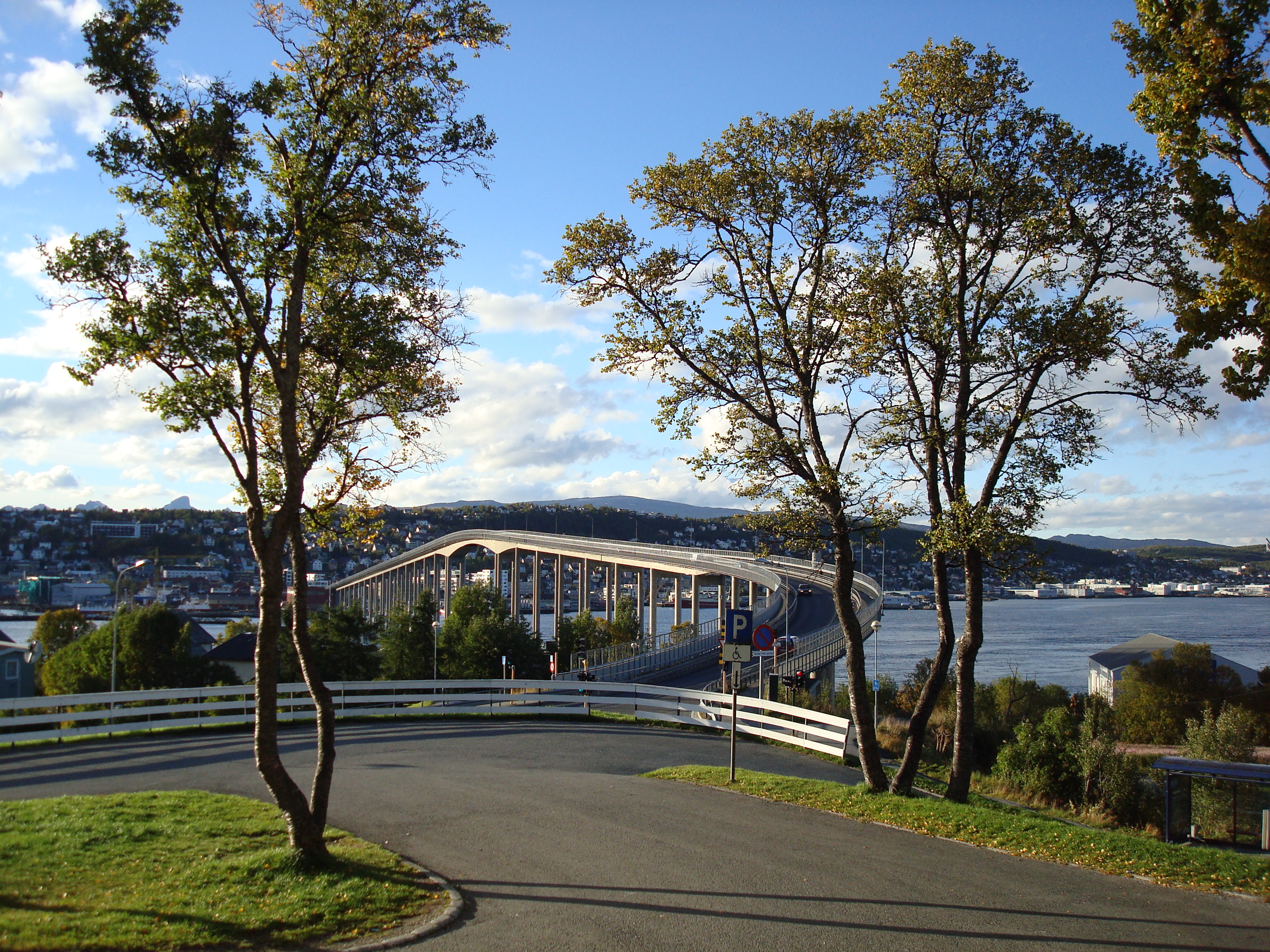
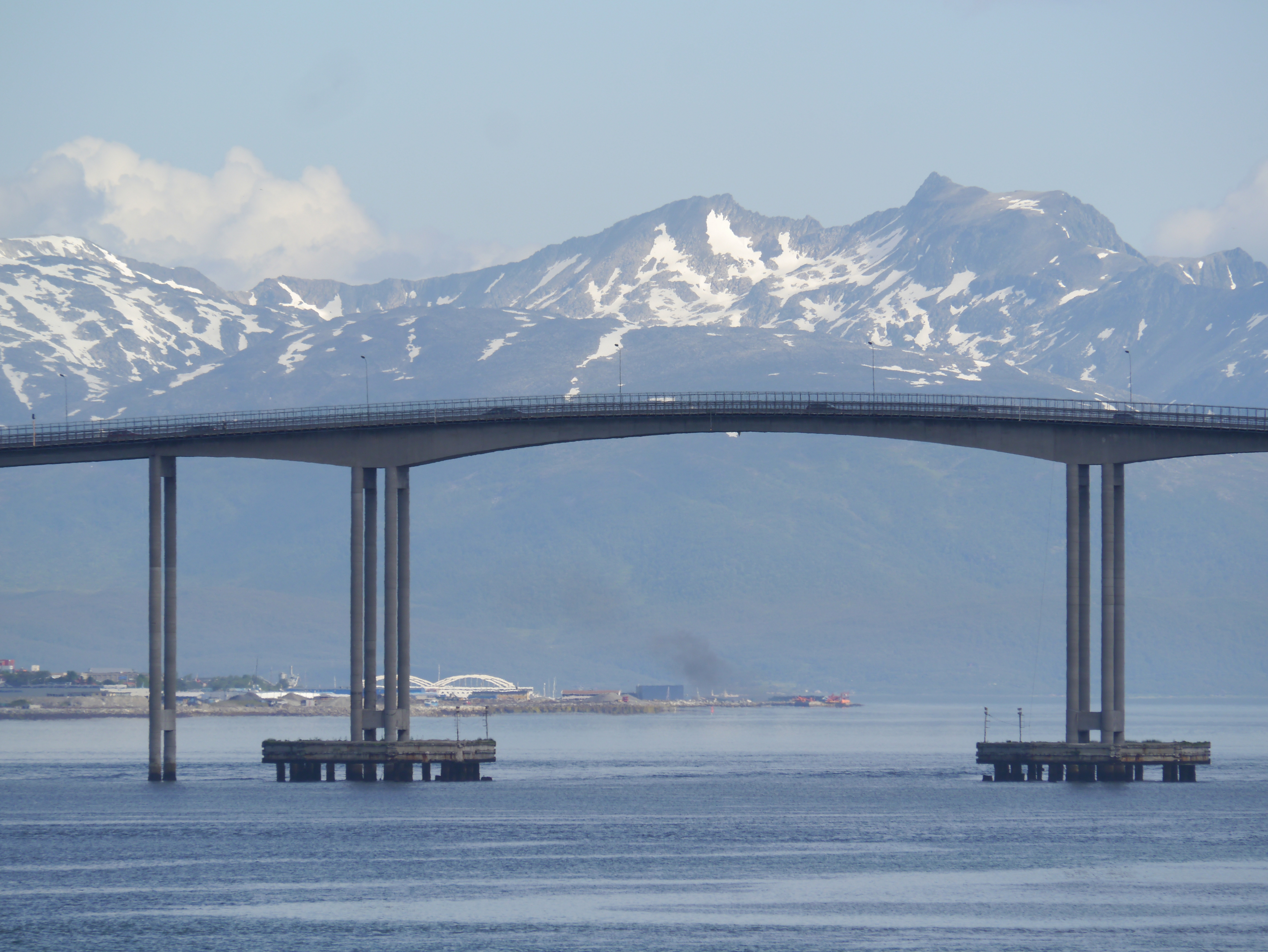
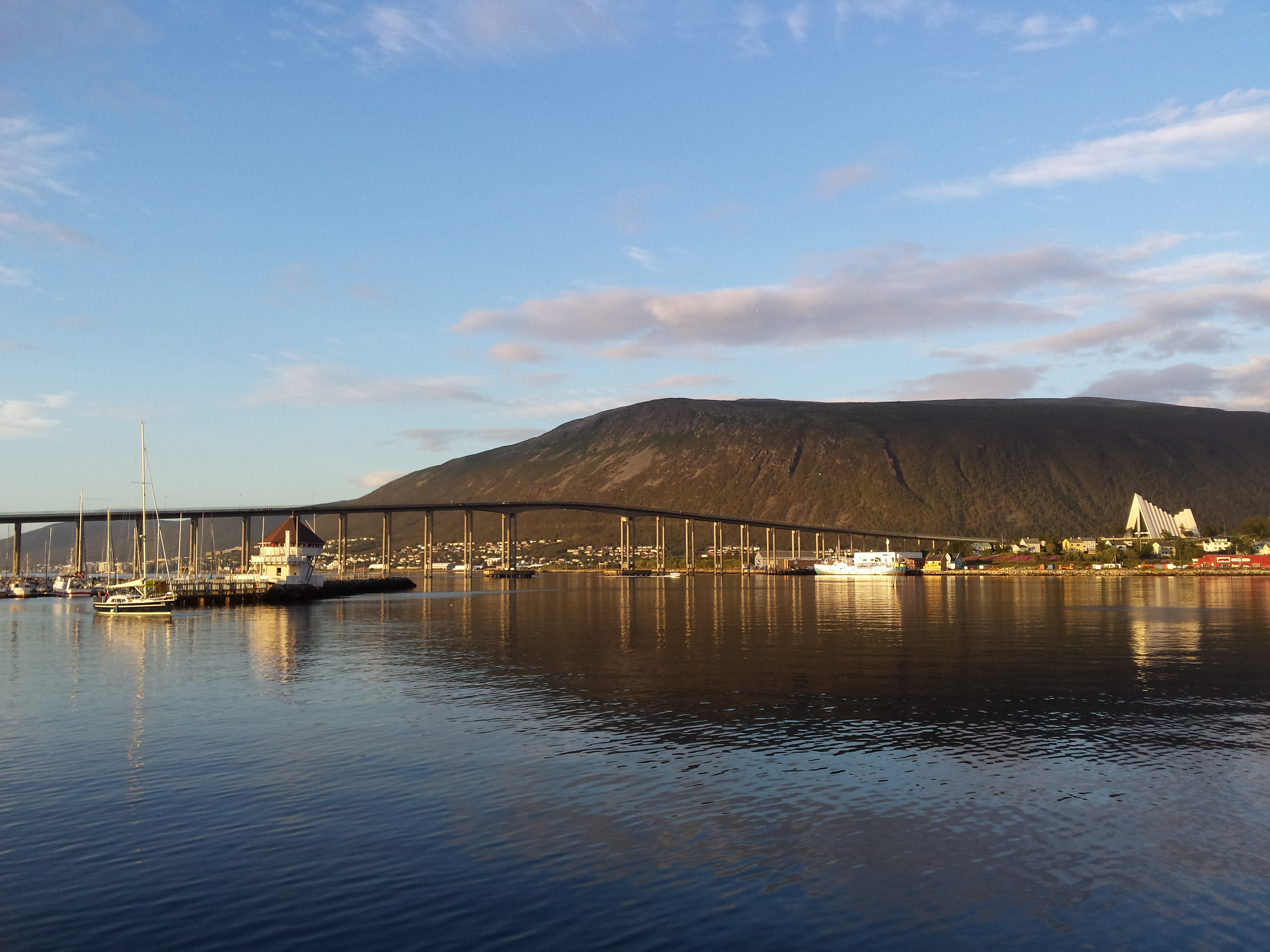
- Coordinates: 69°39′4.68″N 18°58′41.27″E
- Carries: Fv862 (motor vehicles, pedestrians, cyclists)
- Crosses: Tromsøysundet
- Locale: Tromsø, Troms, Norway
- Maintained by: Norwegian Public Roads Administration

Characteristics
- Design: Cantilever
- Material: Reinforced concrete
- Total length: 1,036 metres (3,399 ft)
- Width: 8.3 metres (27 ft)
- Longest span: 80 metres (262 ft)
- No. of spans: 58
- Clearance below: 38 metres (125 ft)

History
- Designer: Aas-Jakobsen, Erling Viksjø
- Construction start: 1958
- Opened: 3 July 1960

The Tromsø Bridge (Norwegian: Tromsøbrua) is a cantilever road bridge in the city of Tromsø which is located in Tromsø Municipality in Troms county, Norway. It crosses the Tromsøysundet strait between Tromsdalen on the mainland and the island of Tromsøya. The 1,036-metre-long (3,399 ft) bridge has 58 spans, of which the longest is 80 metres (260 ft) with a maximum clearance to the sea of 38 metres (125 ft).

== History ==
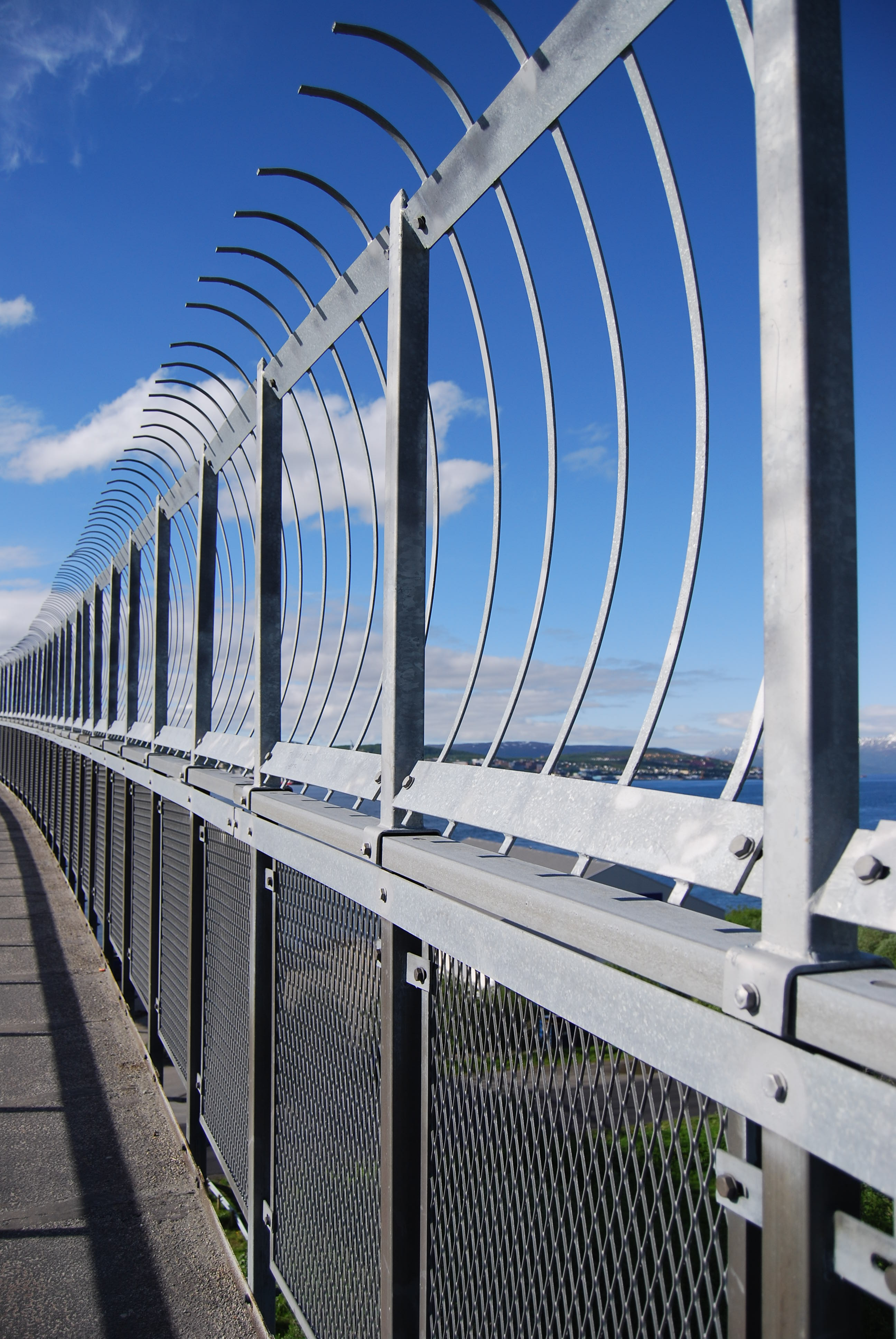
The fence has measures in place to prevent suicide

Construction began in 1958 and the bridge was opened in 1960. At the time of its opening, it was the longest bridge in Northern Europe, with a length of 1,036 metres (3,399 ft). At a cost of 14.5 million kr, the bridge replaced an inefficient ferry connection between the two sides of the strait, and it helped boost the growth and development of Tromsø. Due to severe congestion issues, the mainland road connection was later reinforced by the construction of the Tromsøysund Tunnel in the 1990s. Unlike the tunnel, located almost 3 kilometres (1.9 mi) further north, the Tromsø Bridge leads directly to the city centre of Tromsø.

The Tromsø Bridge was the first cantilever bridge to be built in Norway. Since then, many bridges of this type have been built. The bridge is one of the most important landmarks of Tromsø, and forms part of a motif composed of the Arctic Cathedral, the Tromsdalstinden mountain, and the Tromsø Bridge. In 2000, the Directorate for Cultural Heritage protected the bridge against modifications. In 2005, the fencing was raised by two and a half meters, and seven years later, Norway's road authority planned on adding extra fencing onto many bridges to help prevent suicide.
