= Tromsø Municipality =

Municipality in Troms, Norway

Tromsø Municipality Tromsø kommune Romssa suohkan
- Municipality
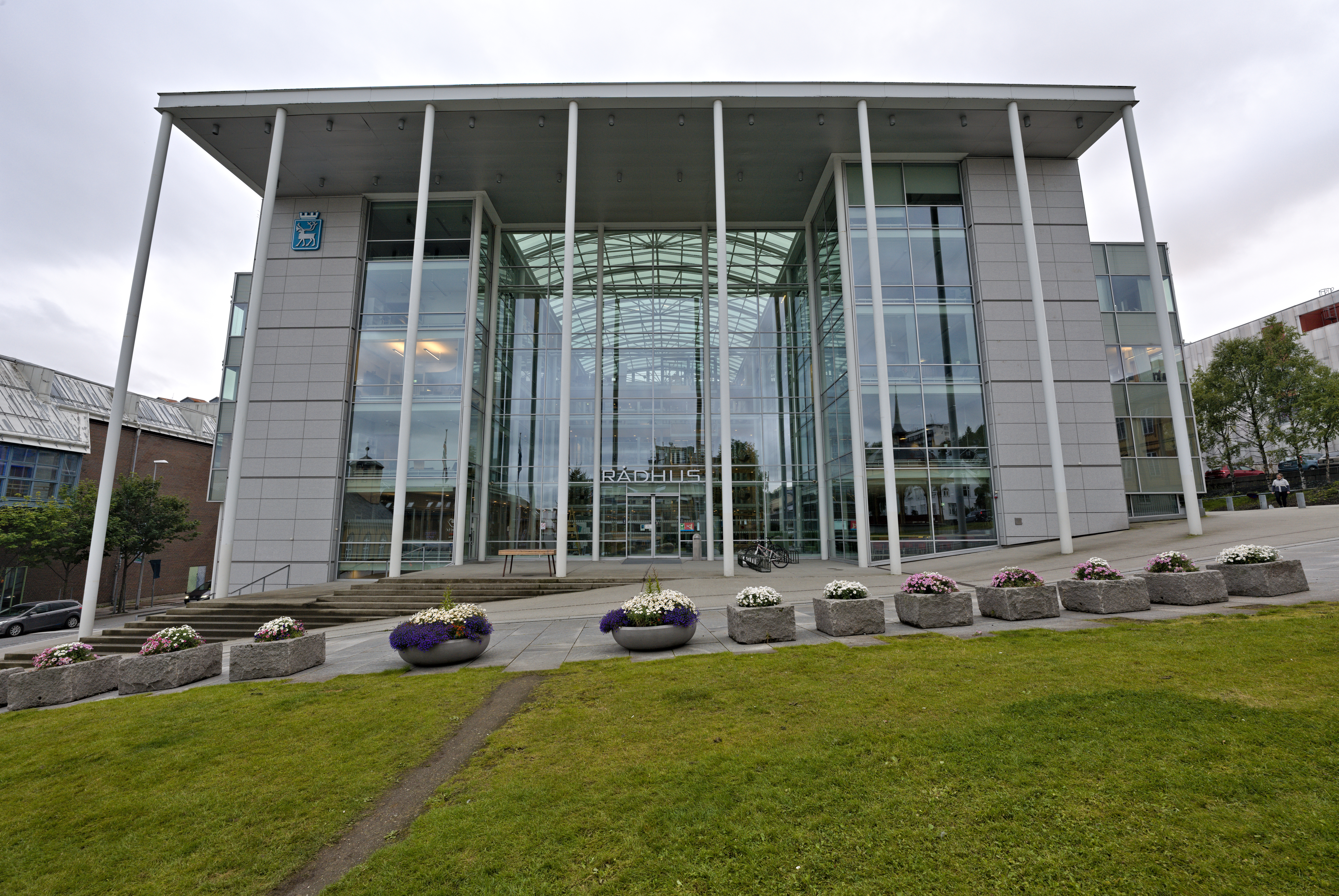
- Tromsø town hall

- Flag Coat of arms
- Nickname(s): Nordens Paris (Paris of the North), Ishavsbyen, 9000-byen
- Troms within Norway

- Tromsø within Troms
- Coordinates: 69°40′58″N 18°56′34″E
- Country: Norway
- County: Troms
- District: Hålogaland
- Established: 1 January 1838
  - Created as: Formannskapsdistrikt
- Administrative centre: Tromsø

Government
  - Mayor (2019): Gunnar Wilhelmsen (Ap)

Area
  - Total: 2,520.80 km^{2} (973.29 sq mi)
  - Land: 2,472.43 km^{2} (954.61 sq mi)
  - Water: 48.37 km^{2} (18.68 sq mi) 1.9%
  - Rank: #21 in Norway
- Highest elevation: 1,830.7 m (6,006 ft)

Population (2024)
  - Total: 78,745
  - Rank: #12 in Norway
  - Density: 31.2/km^{2} (81/sq mi)
  - Change (10 years): ▲ +10%
- Demonym: Tromsøværing

Official language
  - Norwegian form: Neutral
- Time zone: UTC+01:00 (CET)
  - Summer (DST): UTC+02:00 (CEST)
- ISO 3166 code: NO-5501
- Website: Official website

Tromsø Municipality (Note: Norwegian: Tromsø kommune; Norwegian pronunciation: [ˈtrʊmsœ komːʉnə]; Northern Sami: Romssa suohkan) is a municipality in Troms county, Norway. The administrative centre of the municipality is the city of Tromsø. Other notable settlements in the municipality include the villages of Bjerkaker, Ersfjordbotn, Jøvika, Kaldfjord, Kjosen, Kroken, Kvaløysletta, Lakselvbukt, Melvika, Movik, Oldervik, Sandneshamn, Sjursnes, Sommarøy, and Tromsdalen.

The 2,521 km^{2} (973 sq mi) municipality is the 21st largest by area out of the 357 municipalities in Norway. Tromsø is the 12th-most populous municipality in Norway with a population of 78,745. The municipality's population density is 31.2 inhabitants per square kilometre (81/sq mi) and its population has increased by 10% over the previous 10-year period. The city of Tromsø (within Tromsø Municipality) is the largest urban area in Northern Norway and the third largest north of the Arctic Circle anywhere in the world (following Murmansk and Norilsk). The center of the city of Tromsø is located on the island of Tromsøya, but the urban area also encompasses part of the nearby mainland and part of the island Kvaløya. Tromsø is 350 km (217 mi) north of the Arctic Circle. Tromsøya is connected to the mainland by the Tromsø Bridge and the Tromsøysund Tunnel, and to the island of Kvaløya by the Sandnessund Bridge.

The municipality is milder than most settlements on the same latitude, due to the effect of the westerlies reaching this far north, as well as the North Atlantic Drift, a branch of the Gulf Stream. Tromsø's latitude of just below 70°N renders annual midnight suns and polar nights depending on the season.

Tromsø contains the highest number of old wooden houses in Northern Norway, the oldest dating from 1789. Tromsø is a cultural hub for the region, with several festivals taking place in the summer. Due to its location, many countries had consulates or missions in Tromsø in the 1990s.

== General information ==
The city of Tromsø was established as an independent municipality on 1 January 1838 (see formannskapsdistrikt law). The city was completely surrounded by the Tromsøe landdistrikt (the rural municipality of Tromsø / later renamed Tromsøysund Municipality), but they were governed separately. As the city grew in size, areas were added to the city from the rural district.

On 1 January 1861, an area of Tromsøysund Municipality (population: 110) was transferred to the city of Tromsø. On 1 January 1873, an unpopulated area of Tromsøysund Municipality was transferred to the city. On 1 July 1915, another area of Tromsøysund Municipality (population: 512) was merged into the city of Tromsø. On 1 January 1955, the Bjerkaker area on Tromsøya (population: 1,583) was transferred from Tromsøysund Municipality to the city of Tromsø.

During the 1960s, there were many municipal mergers across Norway due to the work of the Schei Committee. On 1 January 1964, the city of Tromsø (population: 12,602), Tromsøysund Municipality (population: 16,727), most of Ullsfjord Municipality except for the Svendsby area (population: 2,019), and most of Hillesøy Municipality except for the parts on the island of Senja (population: 1,316) were all merged to form a new, larger Tromsø Municipality.

On 1 January 2020, the municipality became a part of the newly created Troms og Finnmark county, which replaced the old Troms county. On 1 January 2024, Troms og Finnmark county was divided and the municipality once again became part of Troms county.

=== Coat of arms ===
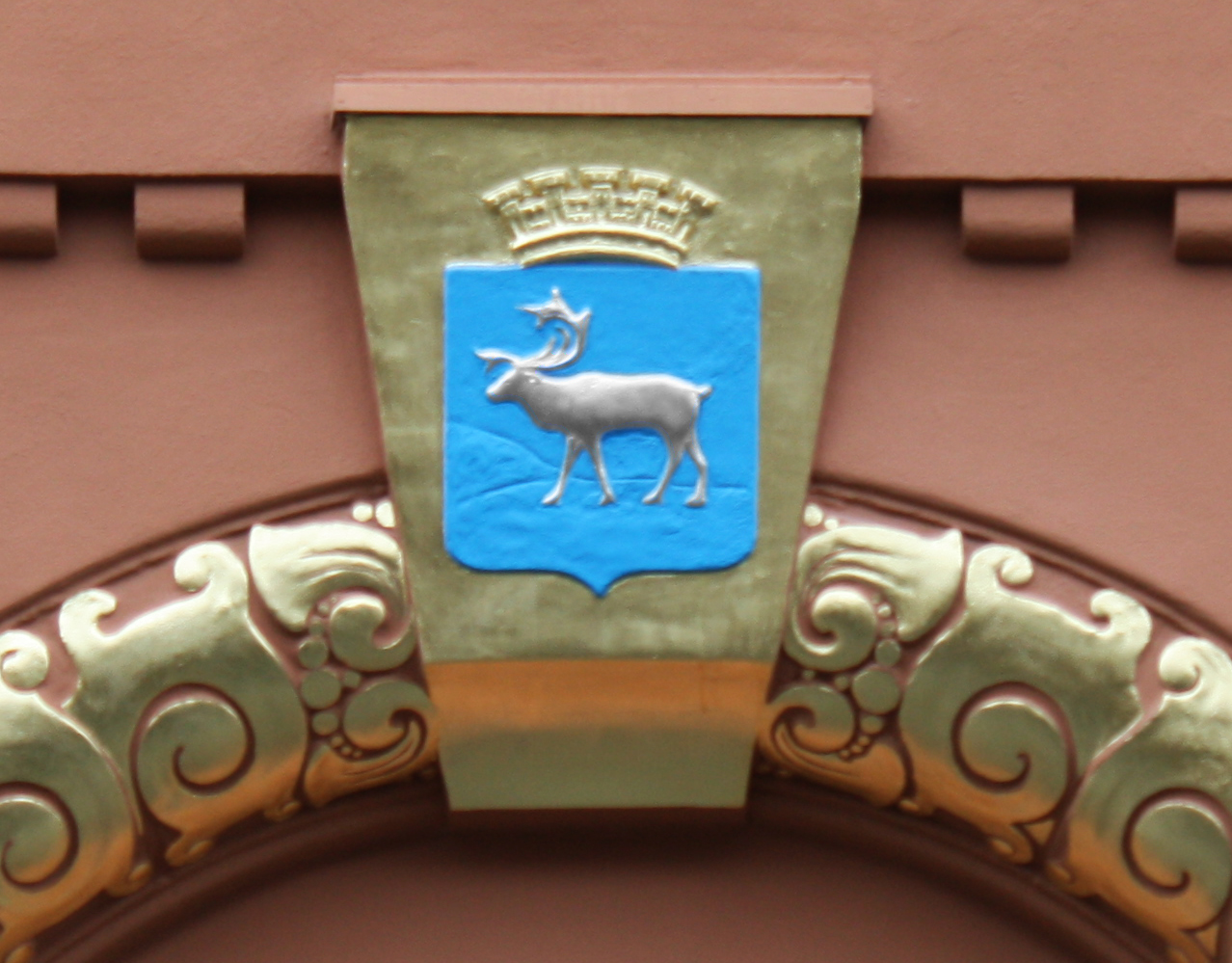
A relief of the arms on a façade of Storgata 65 building known as Rødbanken

The coat of arms (current version) was granted on 22 July 1983, although a variation of these arms has been in use since 1870. The official blazon is "Azure, a reindeer trippant argent" (Norwegian: I blått en gående sølv rein). This means the arms have a blue field (background) and the charge is a reindeer. The reindeer has a tincture of argent which means it is commonly colored white, but if it is made out of metal, then silver is used. It is often surmounted by a mural crown with five or four turrets. The municipal authority currently uses a stylised rendering drawn by Hallvard Trætteberg (1898–1987) and adopted by royal resolution on 24 September 1941. The idea for a coat of arms for Tromsø was presented by A. T. Kaltenborn in 1855 and the coat of arms was first used in connection with the Industry and Crafts Exhibition in Tromsø in 1870. Over time, the background colour has been changed between blue and red. At one point it also used a natural landscape in the background. Although reindeer played little or no role in the city, Tromsø was the administrative center of the vast surrounding areas in the county were reindeer herding was common in this part of Northern Norway.

=== Churches ===
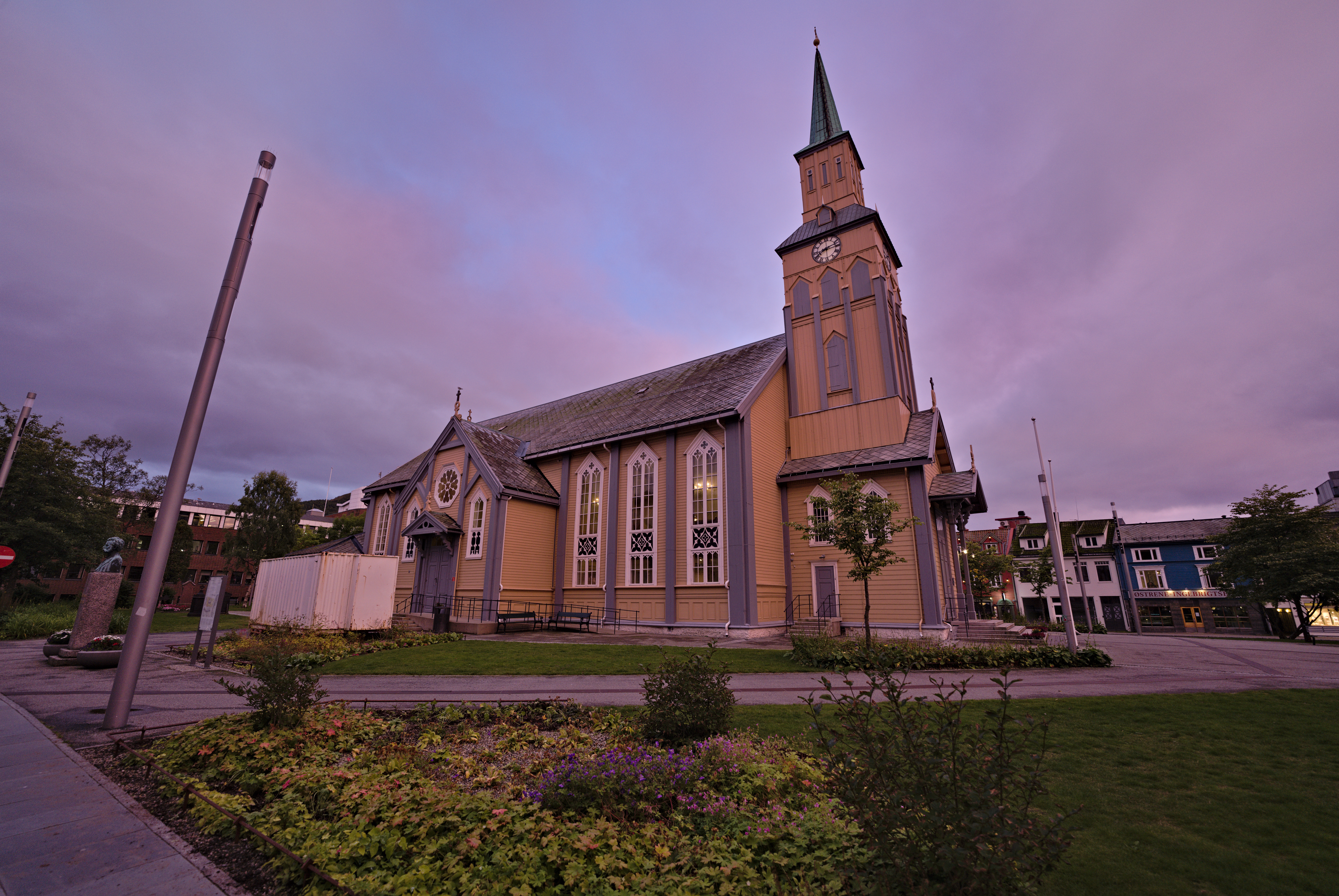
Tromsø Cathedral

The Church of Norway has eight parishes (sokn) within Tromsø Municipality. It is part of the Tromsø domprosti (arch-deanery) in the Diocese of Nord-Hålogaland.

Churches in Tromsø Municipality
Parish (sokn)	Church name	Location of the church	Year built
Tromsø Domkirken	Tromsø Cathedral	Tromsø	1861
Elverhøy	Elverhøy Church	Tromsø	1803
Grønnåsen	Grønnåsen Church	Tromsø	1996
Hillesøy	Hillesøy Church	Brensholmen, Kvaløya	1889
Kroken	Kroken Church	Kroken	2006
Kvaløy	Kvaløy Church	Kaldfjord	1962
Tromsøysund	Arctic Cathedral	Tromsdalen	1965
Ullsfjord	Lakselvbukt Church	Lakselvbukt	1983
Ullsfjord	Ullsfjord Church	Sjursnes	1862
Ullsfjord	Jøvik Chapel	Jøvika	1920

== Geography ==
Tromsø is the 12th largest municipality in Norway with a population of 78,745. The city is home to the world's northernmost university and also houses the northernmost botanical garden and planetarium.

The city centre is located on the east side of the Tromsøya island — over 300 kilometres (190 mi) north of the Arctic Circle at 69°40′33″N 18°55′10″E. Suburban areas include Kroken, Tromsdalen (on the mainland, east of Tromsøya), the rest of the Tromsøya island, and the eastern part of the large Kvaløya, west of the Tromsøya island. The Tromsø Bridge and Tromsøysund Tunnel both cross the Tromsøysundet strait connecting the mainland with Tromsøya by road. On the western side of the city, the Sandnessund Bridge connects Tromsøya island with Kvaløya island.

The highest point in the municipality is the 1,830.7-metre (6,006 ft) tall mountain Jiehkkevárri. There are also many other tall mountains within the municipality including Hamperokken, Store Blåmannen, Store Fornestinden, and Tromsdalstinden. The Lyngen Alps mountain range lies along the Tromsø-Lyngen municipal border. There are many islands within the municipality of Tromsø including Hillesøya, Kvaløya, Rebbenesøya, Ringvassøya, Store Sommarøya, and Tromsøya. There are also several fjords that are located in Tromsø including the Balsfjorden, Kaldfjorden, Malangen, and Ullsfjorden.

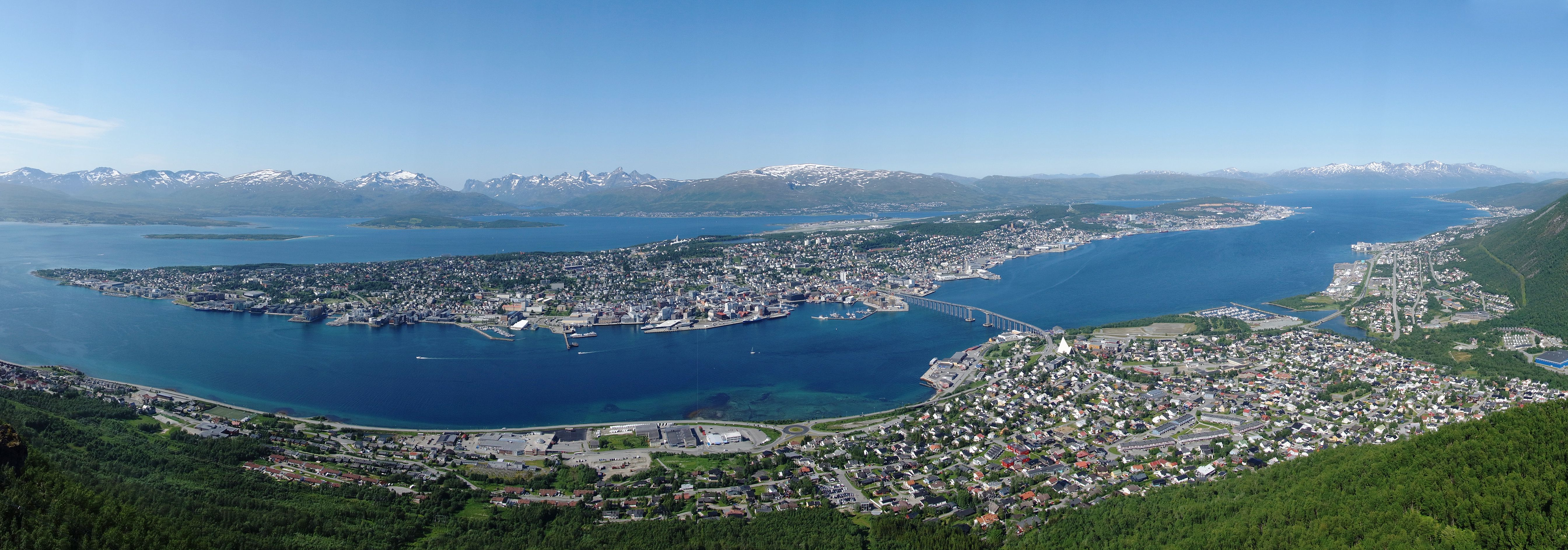
Panoramic view of Tromsø from Fløya. The Tromsø Bridge and the Arctic Cathedral can be seen in the lower-right corner.

== Climate ==
Tromsø municipality spans a large area with complex terrain. As a result of this there is a great variety in climatic conditions within the municipality.

=== Tromsø city ===
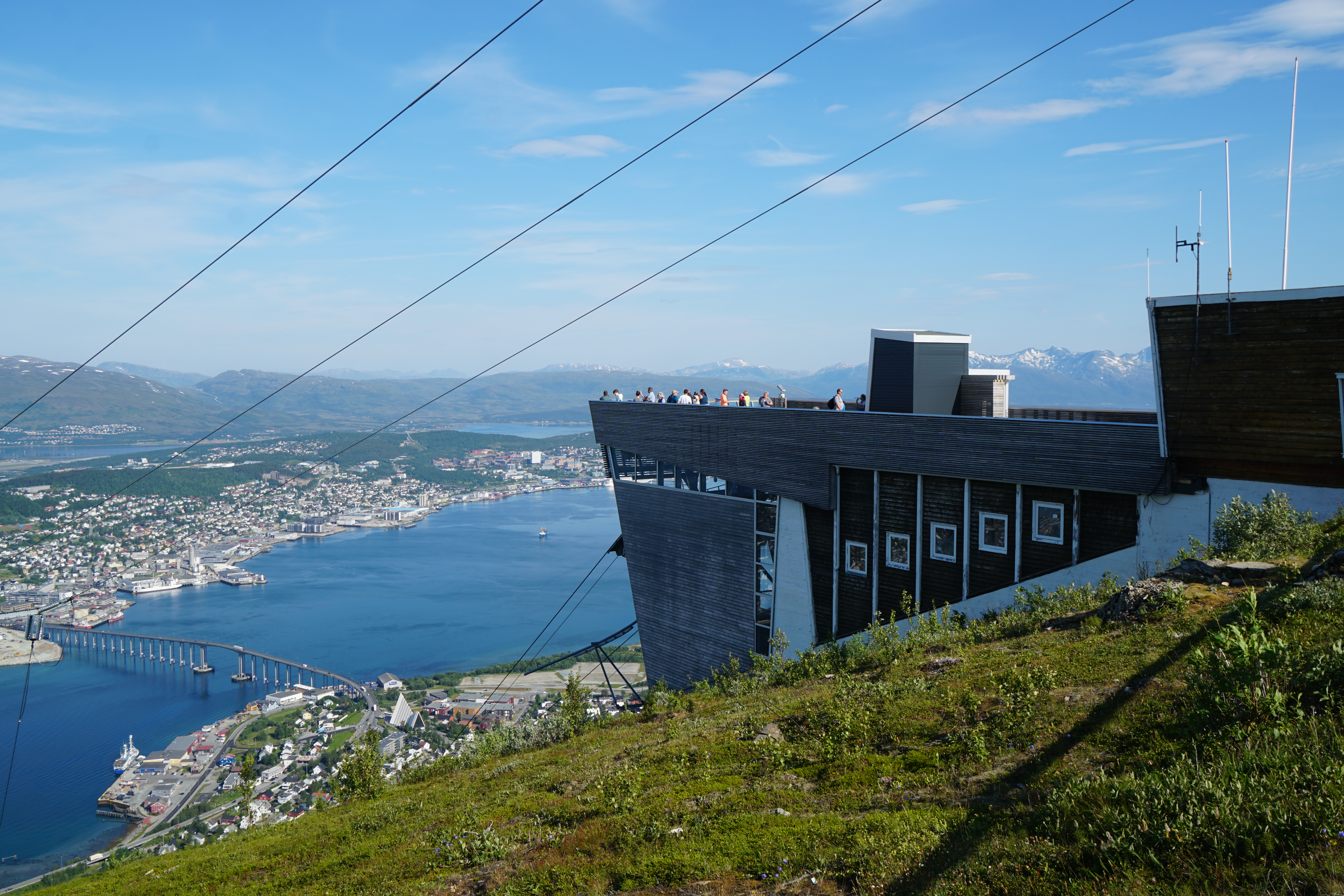
Fjellheisen

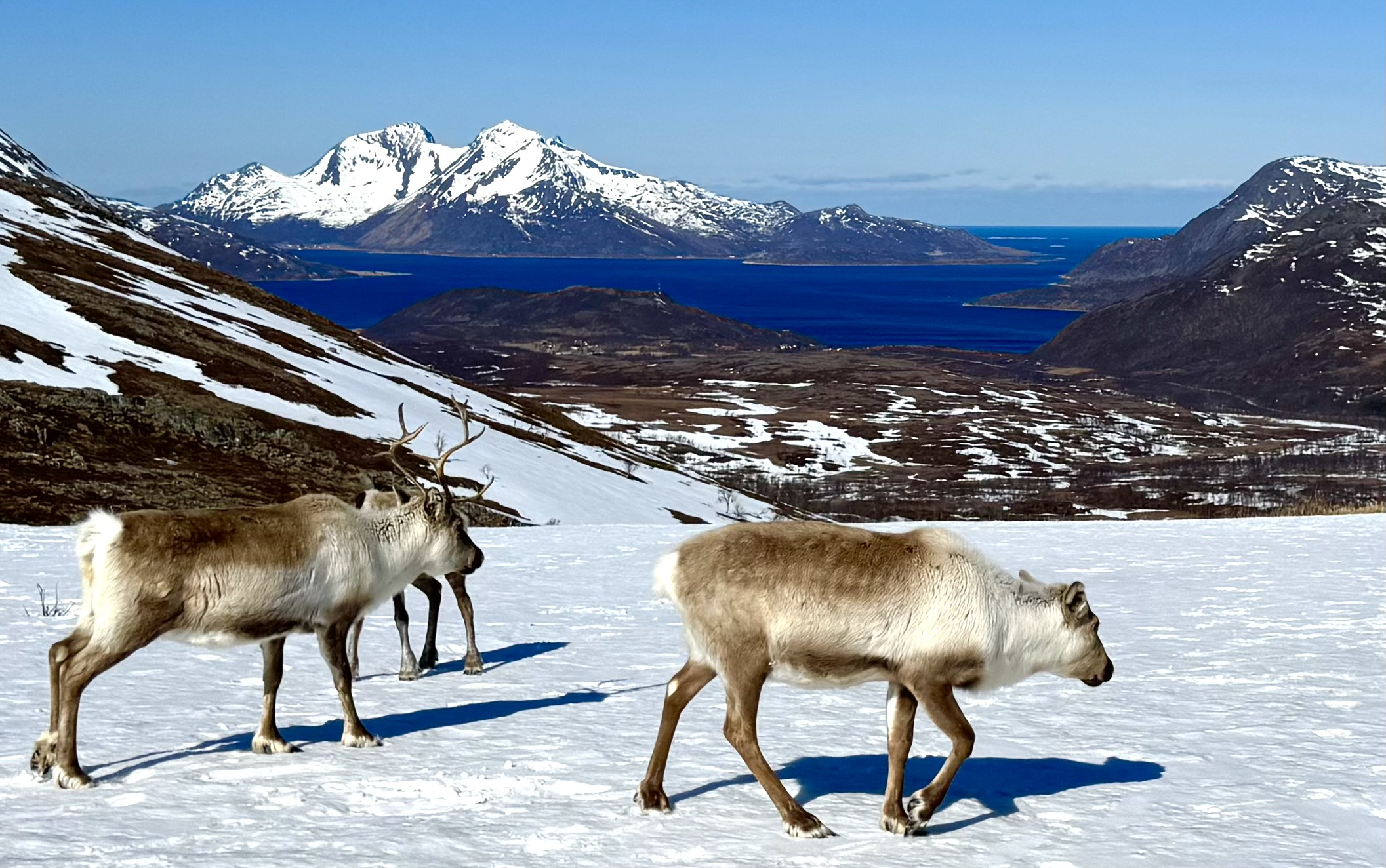
Reindeer on the Island of Kvaløya in Tromsø Municipality

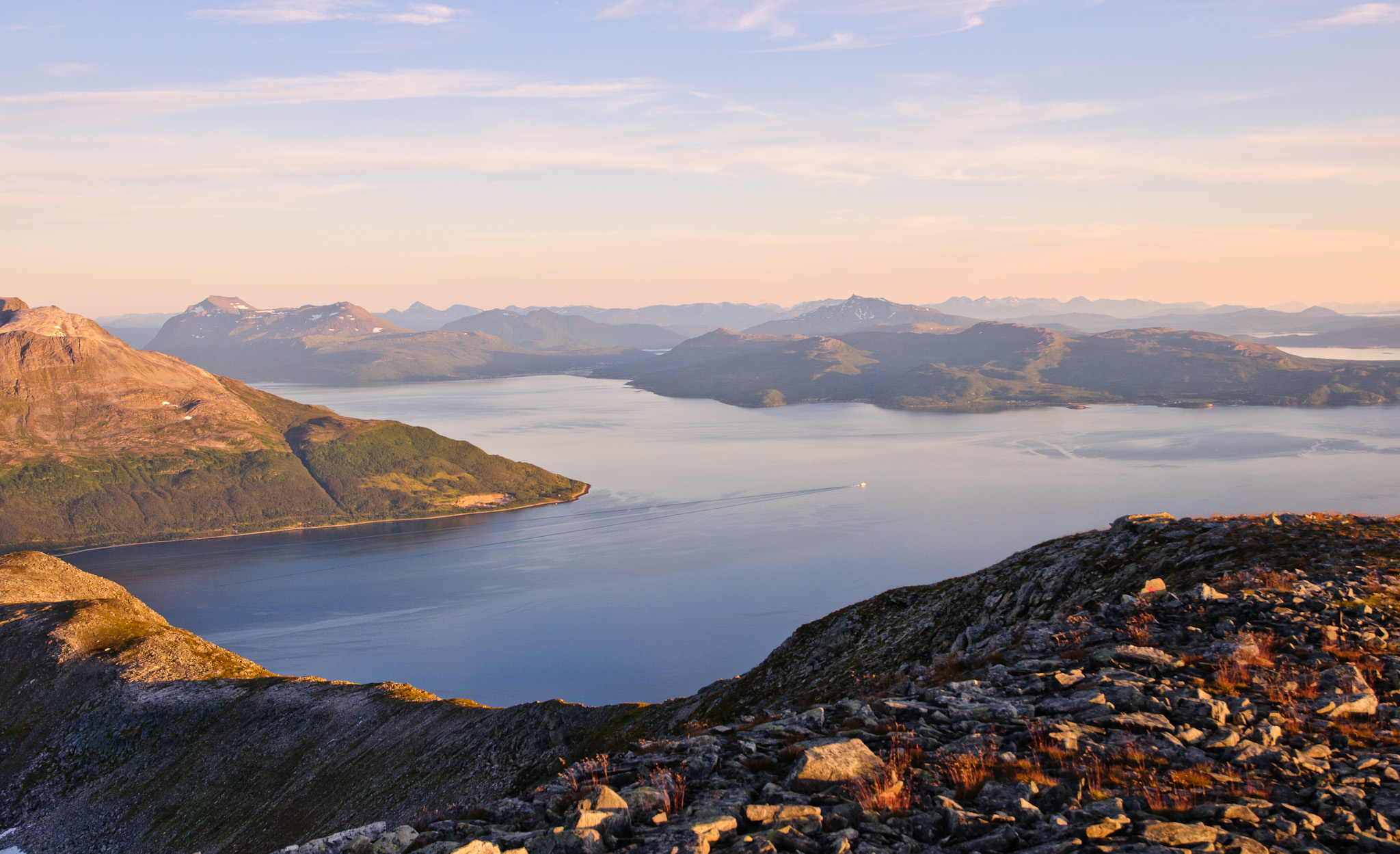
Gråtinden, Kvaløya

Tromsø experiences a subarctic climate (Köppen climate classification Dfc, Trewartha Eolo) as winter temperatures are just cold enough to qualify and the summer season is short. However, precipitation amount and pattern, with maximum precipitation in autumn and winter, as well as lack of permafrost, are atypical for subarctic areas and more typical for oceanic climates. Owing to the ice-free Norwegian Sea and the westerlies bringing the mild air ashore, winter temperatures in Tromsø are moderate and extremely mild for the latitude. Summers are rather cool, sometimes cloudy and rainy, and sometimes sunny, often with large variations from year to year and from month to month, giving a completely different experience, all depending on the weather pattern.

==== Sunshine ====
This variability in weather also gives a large variability in sunshine hours, which has been recorded since 1961: In July 1980 Tromsø recorded 430 sunhours, which is still the national record for sunniest month ever. However, July 1989 only recorded 91 sunhours. June has ranged from just 58 sunhours in June 2018 to 395 sunhours in June 1971 and also June 2002. Tromsø has also recorded the sunniest spring month in Norway with 381 sunhours in May 2013. The "midnight sun" is above the horizon from 19 May to 27 July (71 days), and the period with continuous night lasts a bit shorter, polar night from 28 November to 14 January (48 days). The sunniest January (1985) recorded just 9 sunhours, while the sunniest February saw 97 sunhours (2018).

==== Snow ====
Tromsø has reputation of accumulating a lot of snow in winter, but on the streets of the city ice often prevails, especially in the first half of the winter. Tromsø's snowfall pattern is quite erratic and varies substantially between different winters. Thaws with rain in the polar night mid-winter are not uncommon, which melts or wets existing snow, often followed by chilly windy Arctic blasts, creating dangerous ice driving and walking conditions. It is common to see Tromsø inhabitants walking with spikes in their shoes and almost all cars use studded tires. The all-time record for snow depth was set on 29 April 1997, when the meteorological station on top of Tromsøya recorded 240 centimetres (94.5 in) of snow on the ground. In an average winter, Tromsø sees 160 days with at least 25 centimetres (10 in) of snow on the ground (1970–2000 average, 100 meters above sea level). Despite mild relatively winters, snowfall can happen almost any time of the year except from July to mid-September; in 2019, snowfall was registered on 29 June.

==== Temperature ====
The lowest temperature ever recorded is −18.4 °C (−1.1 °F) in February 1966, which is extremely mild for a location this far north, as it is about the same as the record cold for the U.S. state of Florida − about 40 degrees latitude further south. At the airport the all-time low is −20.1 °C (−4.2 °F) in February 1985. The highest temperature recorded at the met office 100 m amsl is 30.2 °C (86.4 °F) in July 1972. Tromsø recorded its first "tropical night" with overnight low 20.8 °C (69.4 °F) on 30 July 2018. The average date for the last overnight freeze (low below 0 °C (32.0 °F)) in spring is 17 May and average date for first freeze in autumn is 3 October (1981–2010 average) giving a frost-free season of 138 days.

Recent years have seen warming. The recent normal period 1991–2020 shows that the part of the city at low altitude has winters so mild that melting of snow is more likely also in mid-winter. At the Norwegian Institute of Bioeconomy Research (NIBIO) at Holt (20 m) on the western side of Tromsøya, with recording since 1987, the coldest month (February) mean is −2.4 °C (27.7 °F). This makes it a subpolar oceanic climate if the −3.0 °C (26.6 °F) isotherm is used.

Sea temperature data for Tromsø
Month	Jan	Feb	Mar	Apr	May	Jun	Jul	Aug	Sep	Oct	Nov	Dec	Year
Average sea temperature °C (°F)	5.2 (41.4)	4.6 (40.3)	4.2 (39.5)	4.6 (40.3)	6.2 (43.1)	8.8 (47.8)	10.8 (51.4)	11.3 (52.4)	10.1 (50.3)	8.3 (47.0)	7.6 (45.6)	6.4 (43.6)	7.3 (45.2)
Source: Weather Atlas

Climate data for Tromsø (Vervarslinga) 1991–2020 (100 m, extremes 1920–present)
Month	Jan	Feb	Mar	Apr	May	Jun	Jul	Aug	Sep	Oct	Nov	Dec	Year
Record high °C (°F)	8.4 (47.1)	8.5 (47.3)	9.7 (49.5)	17.0 (62.6)	26.6 (79.9)	29.9 (85.8)	30.2 (86.4)	28.4 (83.1)	23.4 (74.1)	18.6 (65.5)	11.9 (53.4)	9.7 (49.5)	30.2 (86.4)
Mean daily maximum °C (°F)	−1.0 (30.2)	−1.2 (29.8)	0.6 (33.1)	4.1 (39.4)	8.8 (47.8)	13.0 (55.4)	16.3 (61.3)	15.0 (59.0)	10.9 (51.6)	5.2 (41.4)	2.1 (35.8)	0.3 (32.5)	6.2 (43.1)
Daily mean °C (°F)	−3.0 (26.6)	−3.3 (26.1)	−1.9 (28.6)	1.2 (34.2)	5.5 (41.9)	9.4 (48.9)	12.3 (54.1)	11.3 (52.3)	7.8 (46.0)	3.1 (37.6)	0.2 (32.4)	−1.7 (28.9)	3.4 (38.1)
Mean daily minimum °C (°F)	−5.3 (22.5)	−5.6 (21.9)	−4.4 (24.1)	−1.6 (29.1)	2.4 (36.3)	6.2 (43.2)	9.0 (48.2)	8.3 (46.9)	5.3 (41.5)	0.9 (33.6)	−1.9 (28.6)	−3.9 (25.0)	0.8 (33.4)
Record low °C (°F)	−18.3 (−0.9)	−18.4 (−1.1)	−17.0 (1.4)	−14.3 (6.3)	−6.6 (20.1)	−2.5 (27.5)	0.7 (33.3)	1.1 (34.0)	−4.3 (24.3)	−9.6 (14.7)	−14.2 (6.4)	−16.8 (1.8)	−18.4 (−1.1)
Average precipitation mm (inches)	108.3 (4.26)	96.7 (3.81)	96.7 (3.81)	71.1 (2.80)	56.5 (2.22)	58 (2.3)	72.5 (2.85)	88 (3.5)	111.3 (4.38)	127.4 (5.02)	94.4 (3.72)	109.7 (4.32)	1,090.6 (42.99)
Average precipitation days (≥ 1 mm)	15.4	12.9	11.4	11.6	11.1	10.3	12.8	12.6	14.9	17.7	13.5	15.6	160.1
Mean monthly sunshine hours	3	36	111	171	215	239	226	164	96	55	8	0	1,324
Mean daily daylight hours	1.8	7.4	11.8	16.3	22.1	24	23.6	18	13.3	8.9	3.6	0	12.6
Average ultraviolet index	0	0	1	2	3	3	3	2	1	0	0	0	1
Source 1: Met Norway, The Weather Network, Meteostat.net
Source 2: Weather Atlas (UV index and daylight hours)

Climate data for Tromsø Airport, Langnes 1991–2020 (8 m)
Month	Jan	Feb	Mar	Apr	May	Jun	Jul	Aug	Sep	Oct	Nov	Dec	Year
Mean daily maximum °C (°F)	−0.4 (31.3)	−0.7 (30.7)	0.7 (33.3)	3.9 (39.0)	8.6 (47.5)	12.5 (54.5)	15.6 (60.1)	14.5 (58.1)	10.7 (51.3)	5.5 (41.9)	2.6 (36.7)	0.9 (33.6)	6.2 (43.2)
Daily mean °C (°F)	−2.8 (27.0)	−3 (27)	−1.8 (28.8)	1.3 (34.3)	5.6 (42.1)	9.3 (48.7)	12.1 (53.8)	11.3 (52.3)	7.9 (46.2)	3.3 (37.9)	0.4 (32.7)	−1.4 (29.5)	3.5 (38.4)
Mean daily minimum °C (°F)	−5.5 (22.1)	−5.7 (21.7)	−4.5 (23.9)	−1.6 (29.1)	2.7 (36.9)	6.7 (44.1)	9.3 (48.7)	8.5 (47.3)	5.3 (41.5)	0.9 (33.6)	−2.1 (28.2)	−4 (25)	0.8 (33.5)
Average precipitation mm (inches)	103.1 (4.06)	92 (3.6)	90.3 (3.56)	61.9 (2.44)	54.9 (2.16)	53.1 (2.09)	60.9 (2.40)	77 (3.0)	104.5 (4.11)	123.4 (4.86)	94.5 (3.72)	108.9 (4.29)	1,024.5 (40.29)
Average precipitation days (≥ 1 mm)	15	13	14	12	11	10	10	11	14	15	13	15	153
Source: NOAA

=== Outer parts of the municipality ===
The western part of the municipality has islands facing the Norwegian sea, like Rebbenesøya, Sommerøya and the outer parts of Kvaløya. Here the winter temperatures are milder, while the summers are cooler than in the city of Tromsø itself.

Climate data for Måsvik, Rebbenesøya, Tromsø 1991–2020 (precipitation from Lyfjord, Kvaløya)
Month	Jan	Feb	Mar	Apr	May	Jun	Jul	Aug	Sep	Oct	Nov	Dec	Year
Daily mean °C (°F)	−0.2 (31.6)	−0.7 (30.7)	−0.1 (31.8)	2.3 (36.1)	5.7 (42.3)	8.9 (48.0)	11.8 (53.2)	11.6 (52.9)	9.3 (48.7)	5.3 (41.5)	2.6 (36.7)	0.9 (33.6)	4.8 (40.6)
Average precipitation mm (inches)	104 (4.1)	78 (3.1)	76 (3.0)	76 (3.0)	47 (1.9)	58 (2.3)	69 (2.7)	91 (3.6)	114 (4.5)	121 (4.8)	93 (3.7)	89 (3.5)	1,016 (40.2)
Source: Norwegian Meteorological Institute

=== Mountains ===
The mountains in the municipality have a tundra climate and are covered by snow and ice for most of the year. The Gjerdvassbu station in Lyngen, just outside of municipality border at 704 m above msl recorded a maximum snow depth of 360.0 cm at in 2025 for example. That year August was the only month without a snow cover.

== Government ==
Tromsø Municipality is responsible for primary education (through 10th grade), outpatient health services, senior citizen services, welfare and other social services, zoning, economic development, and municipal roads and utilities. The municipality is governed by a municipal council of directly elected representatives. The mayor is indirectly elected by a vote of the municipal council. The municipality is under the jurisdiction of the Nord-Troms og Senja District Court and the Hålogaland Court of Appeal.

As of 2026, the municipality is on the Robek list or Register for Governmental Approval of Financial Obligations, putting some constraints on incurring financial obligations.

=== Municipal council ===
The municipal council (Bystyre) of Tromsø Municipality is made up of 43 representatives that are elected for four year terms. Tromsø introduced so-called "parliamentary rule" in 2011. The Municipal council elects an executive body, byrådet ("the city council"), consisting of six byråder ("city councilors"). In theory, these are equivalent to the cabinet members of a parliamentary government. The tables below show the current and historical composition of the council by political party.

Tromsø kommunestyre 2023–2027
Party name (in Norwegian)	Number of representatives
Labour Party (Arbeiderpartiet)	11
Progress Party (Fremskrittspartiet)	7
Green Party (Miljøpartiet De Grønne)	2
Conservative Party (Høyre)	8
Industry and Business Party (Industri‑ og Næringspartiet)	2
Christian Democratic Party (Kristelig Folkeparti)	1
Red Party (Rødt)	2
Centre Party (Senterpartiet)	1
Socialist Left Party (Sosialistisk Venstreparti)	6
Liberal Party (Venstre)	1
City and Rural List (By- og Landlista)	1
No to tolls in Tromsø (Nei til bompenger i Tromsø)	1
Total number of members:	43

Tromsø kommunestyre 2019–2023
Party name (in Norwegian)	Number of representatives
Labour Party (Arbeiderpartiet)	8
People's Action No to More Road Tolls (Folkeaksjonen nei til mer bompenger)	4
Progress Party (Fremskrittspartiet)	4
Green Party (Miljøpartiet De Grønne)	3
Conservative Party (Høyre)	7
Christian Democratic Party (Kristelig Folkeparti)	1
Red Party (Rødt)	2
Centre Party (Senterpartiet)	5
Socialist Left Party (Sosialistisk Venstreparti)	7
Liberal Party (Venstre)	1
City and Rural List (By- og Landlista)	1
Total number of members:	43

Tromsø kommunestyre 2015–2019
Party name (in Norwegian)	Number of representatives
Labour Party (Arbeiderpartiet)	13
Progress Party (Fremskrittspartiet)	5
Green Party (Miljøpartiet De Grønne)	2
Conservative Party (Høyre)	9
Christian Democratic Party (Kristelig Folkeparti)	1
Red Party (Rødt)	6
Centre Party (Senterpartiet)	1
Socialist Left Party (Sosialistisk Venstreparti)	4
Liberal Party (Venstre)	2
Total number of members:	43

Tromsø kommunestyre 2011–2015
Party name (in Norwegian)	Number of representatives
Labour Party (Arbeiderpartiet)	11
Progress Party (Fremskrittspartiet)	6
Green Party (Miljøpartiet De Grønne)	1
Conservative Party (Høyre)	16
Christian Democratic Party (Kristelig Folkeparti)	1
Red Party (Rødt)	3
Centre Party (Senterpartiet)	1
Socialist Left Party (Sosialistisk Venstreparti)	2
Liberal Party (Venstre)	2
Total number of members:	43

Tromsø kommunestyre 2007–2011
Party name (in Norwegian)	Number of representatives
Labour Party (Arbeiderpartiet)	17
Progress Party (Fremskrittspartiet)	9
Conservative Party (Høyre)	5
Christian Democratic Party (Kristelig Folkeparti)	2
Red Electoral Alliance (Rød Valgallianse)	4
Centre Party (Senterpartiet)	1
Socialist Left Party (Sosialistisk Venstreparti)	3
Total number of members:	43

Tromsø kommunestyre 2003–2007
Party name (in Norwegian)	Number of representatives
Labour Party (Arbeiderpartiet)	13
Progress Party (Fremskrittspartiet)	8
Conservative Party (Høyre)	5
Christian Democratic Party (Kristelig Folkeparti)	2
Coastal Party (Kystpartiet)	1
Red Electoral Alliance (Rød Valgallianse)	1
Centre Party (Senterpartiet)	1
Socialist Left Party (Sosialistisk Venstreparti)	10
Liberal Party (Venstre)	1
Parents' List (Foreldre lista)	1
Total number of members:	43

Tromsø kommunestyre 1999–2003
Party name (in Norwegian)	Number of representatives
Labour Party (Arbeiderpartiet)	21
Progress Party (Fremskrittspartiet)	6
Conservative Party (Høyre)	10
Christian Democratic Party (Kristelig Folkeparti)	3
Red Electoral Alliance (Rød Valgallianse)	2
Centre Party (Senterpartiet)	2
Socialist Left Party (Sosialistisk Venstreparti)	6
Liberal Party (Venstre)	2
Solidarity (Solidaritet)	1
Total number of members:	53

Tromsø kommunestyre 1995–1999
Party name (in Norwegian)	Number of representatives
Labour Party (Arbeiderpartiet)	21
Progress Party (Fremskrittspartiet)	5
Green Party (Miljøpartiet De Grønne)	1
Conservative Party (Høyre)	16
Christian Democratic Party (Kristelig Folkeparti)	4
Red Electoral Alliance (Rød Valgallianse)	4
Centre Party (Senterpartiet)	4
Socialist Left Party (Sosialistisk Venstreparti)	8
Liberal Party (Venstre)	2
Solidarity (Solidaritet)	4
Total number of members:	69

Tromsø kommunestyre 1991–1995
Party name (in Norwegian)	Number of representatives
Labour Party (Arbeiderpartiet)	17
Progress Party (Fremskrittspartiet)	2
Conservative Party (Høyre)	25
Christian Democratic Party (Kristelig Folkeparti)	3
Red Electoral Alliance (Rød Valgallianse)	2
Centre Party (Senterpartiet)	4
Socialist Left Party (Sosialistisk Venstreparti)	14
Liberal Party (Venstre)	2
Total number of members:	69

Tromsø kommunestyre 1987–1991
Party name (in Norwegian)	Number of representatives
Labour Party (Arbeiderpartiet)	23
Progress Party (Fremskrittspartiet)	5
Conservative Party (Høyre)	25
Christian Democratic Party (Kristelig Folkeparti)	3
Red Electoral Alliance (Rød Valgallianse)	4
Centre Party (Senterpartiet)	1
Socialist Left Party (Sosialistisk Venstreparti)	6
Liberal Party (Venstre)	2
Total number of members:	69

Tromsø kommunestyre 1983–1987
Party name (in Norwegian)	Number of representatives
Labour Party (Arbeiderpartiet)	25
Progress Party (Fremskrittspartiet)	3
Conservative Party (Høyre)	23
Christian Democratic Party (Kristelig Folkeparti)	4
Red Electoral Alliance (Rød Valgallianse)	4
Centre Party (Senterpartiet)	1
Socialist Left Party (Sosialistisk Venstreparti)	6
Liberal Party (Venstre)	3
Total number of members:	69

Tromsø kommunestyre 1979–1983
Party name (in Norwegian)	Number of representatives
Labour Party (Arbeiderpartiet)	22
Progress Party (Fremskrittspartiet)	1
Conservative Party (Høyre)	24
Christian Democratic Party (Kristelig Folkeparti)	6
Red Electoral Alliance (Rød Valgallianse)	3
Centre Party (Senterpartiet)	3
Socialist Left Party (Sosialistisk Venstreparti)	5
Liberal Party (Venstre)	5
Total number of members:	69

Tromsø kommunestyre 1975–1979
Party name (in Norwegian)	Number of representatives
Labour Party (Arbeiderpartiet)	25
Anders Lange's Party (Anders Langes parti)	1
Conservative Party (Høyre)	14
Christian Democratic Party (Kristelig Folkeparti)	8
New People's Party (Nye Folkepartiet)	3
Red Electoral Alliance (Rød Valgallianse)	1
Centre Party (Senterpartiet)	6
Socialist Left Party (Sosialistisk Venstreparti)	6
Liberal Party (Venstre)	5
Total number of members:	69

Tromsø kommunestyre 1971–1975
Party name (in Norwegian)	Number of representatives
Labour Party (Arbeiderpartiet)	30
Conservative Party (Høyre)	10
Christian Democratic Party (Kristelig Folkeparti)	4
Centre Party (Senterpartiet)	5
Socialist People's Party (Sosialistisk Folkeparti)	5
Liberal Party (Venstre)	12
Socialist common list (Venstresosialistiske felleslister)	3
Total number of members:	69

Tromsø kommunestyre 1967–1971
Party name (in Norwegian)	Number of representatives
Labour Party (Arbeiderpartiet)	37
Conservative Party (Høyre)	10
Communist Party (Kommunistiske Parti)	1
Christian Democratic Party (Kristelig Folkeparti)	2
Centre Party (Senterpartiet)	2
Socialist People's Party (Sosialistisk Folkeparti)	4
Liberal Party (Venstre)	13
Total number of members:	69

Tromsø kommunestyre 1963–1967
Party name (in Norwegian)	Number of representatives
Labour Party (Arbeiderpartiet)	36
Conservative Party (Høyre)	12
Communist Party (Kommunistiske Parti)	1
Christian Democratic Party (Kristelig Folkeparti)	3
Centre Party (Senterpartiet)	1
Socialist People's Party (Sosialistisk Folkeparti)	2
Liberal Party (Venstre)	14
Total number of members:	69

Tromsø bystyre 1959–1963
Party name (in Norwegian)	Number of representatives
Labour Party (Arbeiderpartiet)	26
Conservative Party (Høyre)	10
Communist Party (Kommunistiske Parti)	3
Christian Democratic Party (Kristelig Folkeparti)	2
Liberal Party (Venstre)	12
Total number of members:	53

Tromsø bystyre 1955–1959
Party name (in Norwegian)	Number of representatives
Labour Party (Arbeiderpartiet)	24
Conservative Party (Høyre)	8
Communist Party (Kommunistiske Parti)	4
Christian Democratic Party (Kristelig Folkeparti)	3
Liberal Party (Venstre)	14
Total number of members:	53

Tromsø bystyre 1951–1955
Party name (in Norwegian)	Number of representatives
Labour Party (Arbeiderpartiet)	24
Conservative Party (Høyre)	7
Communist Party (Kommunistiske Parti)	4
Liberal Party (Venstre)	17
Total number of members:	52

Tromsø bystyre 1947–1951
Party name (in Norwegian)	Number of representatives
Labour Party (Arbeiderpartiet)	22
Conservative Party (Høyre)	6
Communist Party (Kommunistiske Parti)	6
Liberal Party (Venstre)	18
Total number of members:	52

Tromsø bystyre 1945–1947
Party name (in Norwegian)	Number of representatives
Labour Party (Arbeiderpartiet)	24
Conservative Party (Høyre)	5
Communist Party (Kommunistiske Parti)	8
Liberal Party (Venstre)	15
Total number of members:	52

Tromsø bystyre 1937–1941*
Party name (in Norwegian)	Number of representatives
Labour Party (Arbeiderpartiet)	21
Conservative Party (Høyre)	12
Communist Party (Kommunistiske Parti)	2
Liberal Party (Venstre)	17
Total number of members:	52
Note: Due to the German occupation of Norway during World War II, no elections were held for new municipal councils until after the war ended in 1945.

Tromsø bystyre 1934–1937
Party name (in Norwegian)	Number of representatives
Labour Party (Arbeiderpartiet)	22
Conservative Party (Høyre)	13
Communist Party (Kommunistiske Parti)	3
Liberal Party (Venstre)	14
Total number of members:	52

Tromsø bystyre 1931–1934
Party name (in Norwegian)	Number of representatives
Labour Party (Arbeiderpartiet)	15
Communist Party (Kommunistiske Parti)	5
Liberal Party (Venstre)	15
Joint list of the Conservative Party (Høyre) and the Free-minded People's Party (Frisinnede Folkeparti)	11
Joint List(s) of Non-Socialist Parties (Borgerlige Felleslister)	3
Local List(s) (Lokale lister)	3
Total number of members:	52

Tromsø bystyre 1928–1931
Party name (in Norwegian)	Number of representatives
Labour Party (Arbeiderpartiet)	20
Communist Party (Kommunistiske Parti)	4
Radical People's Party (Radikale Folkepartiet)	3
Liberal Party (Venstre)	12
Joint list of the Conservative Party (Høyre) and the Free-minded Liberal Party (Frisinnede Venstre)	13
Total number of members:	52

Tromsø bystyre 1925–1928
Party name (in Norwegian)	Number of representatives
Labour Party (Arbeiderpartiet)	10
Social Democratic Labour Party (Socialdemokratiske Arbeiderparti)	2
Tromsø Workers Party (Tromsø Arbeiderparti)	3
Joint list of the Conservative Party (Høyre) and the Free-minded Liberal Party (Frisinnede Venstre)	15
Joint list of the Liberal Party (Venstre) and the Labour Democrats (Arbeiderdemokratene)	17
Workers' Common List (Arbeidernes fellesliste)	5
Total number of members:	52

Tromsø bystyre 1922–1925
Party name (in Norwegian)	Number of representatives
Labour Party (Arbeiderpartiet)	19
Joint list of the Liberal Party and the Social Democratic Labour Party (Venstre og Socialdemokratiske Arbeiderparti fellesliste)	16
Joint list of the Conservative Party (Høyre) and the Free-minded Liberal Party (Frisinnede Venstre)	17
Total number of members:	52

Tromsø bystyre 1919–1922
Party name (in Norwegian)	Number of representatives
Labour Party (Arbeiderpartiet)	16
Liberal Party (Venstre)	13
Joint list of the Conservative Party (Høyre) and the Free-minded Liberal Party (Frisinnede Venstre)	15
Total number of members:	44

Tromsø bystyre 1917–1919
Party name (in Norwegian)	Number of representatives
Labour Party (Arbeiderpartiet)	16
Liberal Party (Venstre)	17
Joint list of the Conservative Party (Høyre) and the Free-minded Liberal Party (Frisinnede Venstre)	11
Total number of members:	44

=== Mayors ===
The mayor (Norwegian: ordfører) of Tromsø Municipality is the political leader of the municipality and the chairperson of the municipal council. Here is a list of people who have held this position:

- 1838–1840: Ulrik Frederik Lange
- 1841–1841: Theodor B. Holst
- 1842–1842: Jørgen Christian Dreyer
- 1843–1844: Ulrik Frederik Lange
- 1845–1845: Otto Th. Krogh
- 1846–1848: Ulrik Frederik Lange
- 1849–1850: Martinus Nissen Drejer
- 1851–1851: Peder Hanssen
- 1852–1852: Martinus Nissen Drejer
- 1853–1853: Peder Hanssen
- 1854–1856: Hans Blom
- 1857–1859: Johannes Steen (V)
- 1859–1859: Martinus Nissen Drejer
- 1860–1862: Johannes Steen (V)
- 1862–1862: Peder Hanssen
- 1863–1863: Martinus Nissen Drejer
- 1864–1865: Johannes Steen (V)
- 1865–1867: Martinus Nissen Drejer
- 1868–1868: Nils J. Nilsen
- 1869–1869: Ole Christian Berge
- 1870–1874: Casper R. Knap
- 1874–1874: Ole Christian Berge
- 1875–1881: Jens A. H. Killengreen
- 1882–1882: Andreas R. Moursund
- 1883–1885: Paul Steenstrup Koht (V)
- 1885–1886: Andreas R. Moursund
- 1887–1889: Hans Jacob Horst (V)
- 1889–1890: Nicolai N. Wulff
- 1891–1891: Peder Kjerschow
- 1891–1891: Peter K. Johnsgaard
- 1891–1894: Anton Næss
- 1895–1896: Peter K. Johnsgaard
- 1897–1897: Richard Killengreen
- 1898–1898: Samuel Arnesen
- 1898–1898: Daniel Mack
- 1899–1899: Just Knud Qvigstad (H)
- 1900–1903: Thomas Eidem (V)
- 1904–1904: Oscar Schønberg
- 1905–1905: Just Knud Qvigstad (H)
- 1906–1906: Thomas Eidem (V)
- 1907–1907: Just Knud Qvigstad (H)
- 1908–1908: Arnold Holmboe (V)
- 1909–1909: Herman Meinich (H)
- 1910–1912: Thomas Eidem (V)
- 1913–1914: Arnold Holmboe (V)
- 1914–1916: Olaf Martin Kolsum (V)
- 1917–1917: Arnold Holmboe (V)
- 1918–1919: Ragnvald Gabrielsen
- 1920–1921: Otto Hjersing Munthe-Kaas (H)
- 1922–1922: Thorvald B. Moe
- 1923–1925: Olaf Martin Kolsum (V)
- 1926–1926: Johan Rydningen
- 1926–1927: Olaf Fjalstad
- 1928–1928: Mathias A. Hellebust
- 1929–1932: Jens Isak de Lange Kobro (V)
- 1933–1934: Olaf Martin Kolsum (V)
- 1935–1936: Nils Meland
- 1937–1941: Alfred Nilsen (V)
- 1941–1941: Birger Motzfeldt (NS)
- 1942–1942: Ole Thyholdt (NS)
- 1942–1942: Hjalmar Høyem (NS)
- 1943–1944: Peder Larsen (NS)
- 1944–1944: Anders O. Gagnås (NS)
- 1944–1945: Idar Schiefloe (NS)
- 1945–1945: Lars Nordmo (NS)
- 1945–1945: Jens Isak de Lange Kobro (V)
- 1946–1952: Ingvald Jaklin (Ap)
- 1953–1964: Wictor Robertsen (Ap)
- 1966–1973: Kåre Nordgård (Ap)
- 1973–1975: Helge Jacobsen (Ap)
- 1976–1977: Arne Norgård (Sp)
- 1978–1979: Helge Jacobsen (Ap)
- 1980–1995: Erlend Rian (H)
- 1995–1999: Alvhild Yttergård (H)
- 1999–2007: Herman Kristoffersen (Ap)
- 2007–2011: Arild Hausberg (Ap)
- 2011–2015: Jens Johan Hjort (H)
- 2015–2016: Jarle Aarbakke (Ap)
- 2016–2019: Kristin Røymo (Ap)
- 2019–present: Gunnar Wilhelmsen (Ap)

== Economics ==
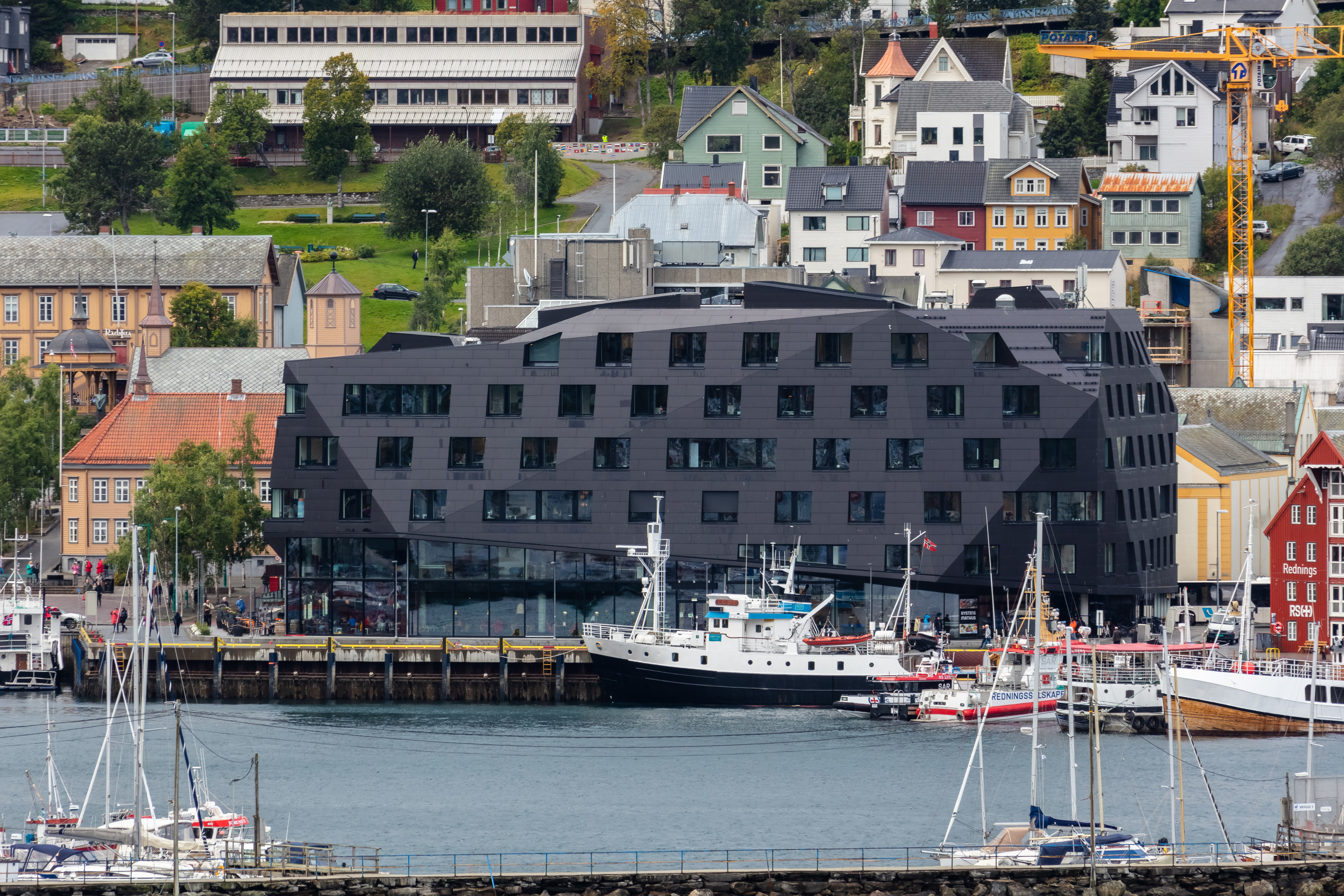
Coastal Seafood Center in Northern Norway (Norwegian: Kystens Hus)

Tromsø is one of the largest fishing ports in Norway. Secondary to fishing, the University of Tromsø is a center for Arctic research. Tourism has exploded as an alternative economic resource in recent decades. There are now direct flights from many European countries.

In 2021, the US Navy opened facilities to service American submarines at the port, after undergoing a significant expansion in 2020.

== Twin towns – sister cities ==
Tromsø Municipality has sister city agreements with the following places:

- Anchorage, United States (1969)
- (Palestine) Gaza City, The Palestinian Authorities (2001)
- Kemi, Finland (1940)
- Luleå, Sweden (1950)
- Quetzaltenango, Guatemala (1999)
- Zagreb, Croatia (1971)

Tromsø signed a sister city agreement with Murmansk, Russia, on 10 July 1972 and terminated it on 22 October 2022, after the Russian invasion of Ukraine in February 2022.
