= Tromsøya =

Island in Tromsø, Norway

Tromsøya (Norwegian); Romssasuolu (Northern Sami)
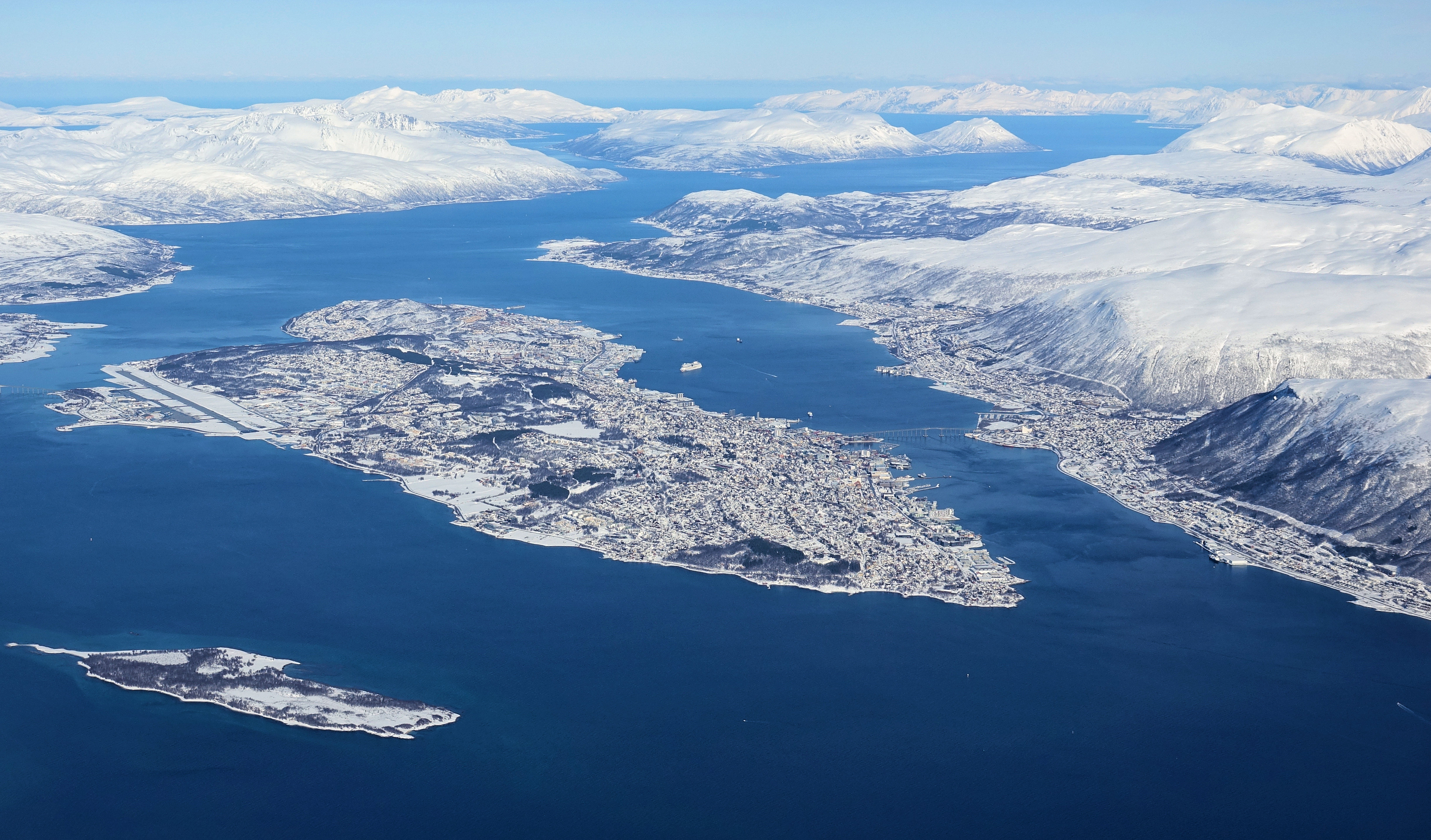
- Interactive map of: Tromsøya (Norwegian); Romssasuolu (Northern Sami)

Geography
- Location: Troms, Norway
- Coordinates: 69.6676°N 18.9258°E
- Area: 21.7 km^{2} (8.4 sq mi)

Administration
- Norway
- County: Troms
- Municipality: Tromsø Municipality

Demographics
- Population: 39,882 (2018)
- Pop. density: 1,838/km^{2} (4760/sq mi)

Tromsøya (Norwegian) or Romssasuolu (Northern Sami) is an island in Tromsø Municipality in Troms county, Norway. It lies in the Tromsøysundet strait between the mainland and the larger island of Kvaløya. The city of Tromsø is located on the 21.7-square-kilometre (8.4 sq mi) island, which has 39,882 residents. The island is connected to the Tromsdalen area on the mainland to the east by the Tromsø Bridge and Tromsøysund Tunnel, and to the village of Kvaløysletta on Kvaløya island to the west by the Sandnessund Bridge.

Tromsø Airport is situated on the western side of the island. Prestvannet lake is located in the middle of the island, and the lake and the area around it is now a nature reserve area. The University of Tromsø, Tromsø police station, Tromsø fire station, University Hospital of North Norway, and Tromsø Museum are all located on the eastern part of the island.

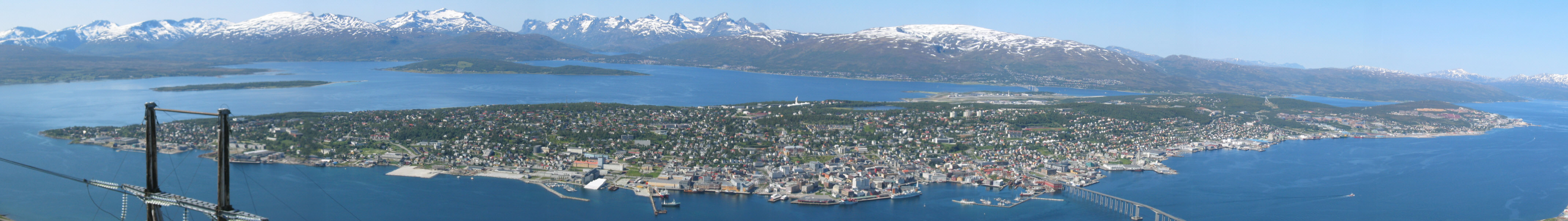
A panoramic view of Tromsøya
