= Tromsøysundet =

Strait in Troms, Norway

Tromsøysundet (Norwegian) Romssanuorri (Northern Sami)
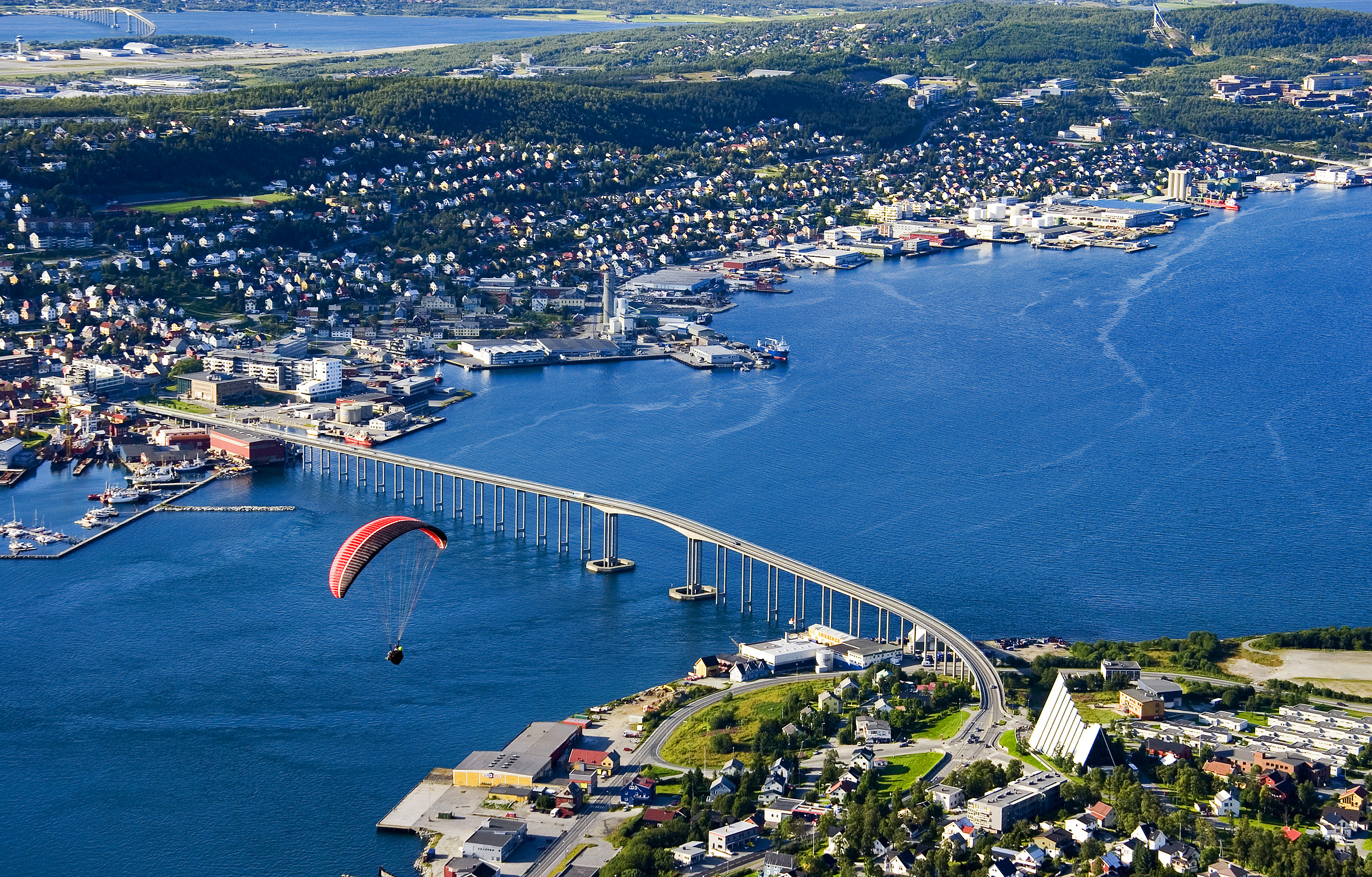
- View of the strait with the city of Tromsø in the background
- Interactive map of the strait
- Location: Troms county, Norway
- Coordinates: 69.6617°N 18.9914°E
- Type: Strait
- Basin countries: Norway
- Max. length: 11 kilometres (6.8 mi)
- Max. width: 0.6–3 kilometres (0.4–1.9 mi)
- Islands: Tromsøya
- Settlements: Tromsø

Tromsøysundet (Norwegian) or Romssanuorri (Northern Sami) is a strait located in Tromsø Municipality in Troms county, Norway. The 11-kilometre (6.8 mi) long strait separates the island of Tromsøya (the location of the city of Tromsø) from the mainland east of the island. The strait is crossed by the Tromsøysund Tunnel (E8 highway) and by the Tromsø Bridge. The strait ranges from about 0.6–3 kilometres (0.4–1.9 mi) wide. The strait connects to the Balsfjorden and Straumsfjorden to the south and into the Kvalsundet and Grøtsundet straits to the north.
