= Tromsøysund Tunnel =

Undersea tunnel in Tromsø, Norway

Tromsøysund Tunnel (Tromsøysundtunnelen)
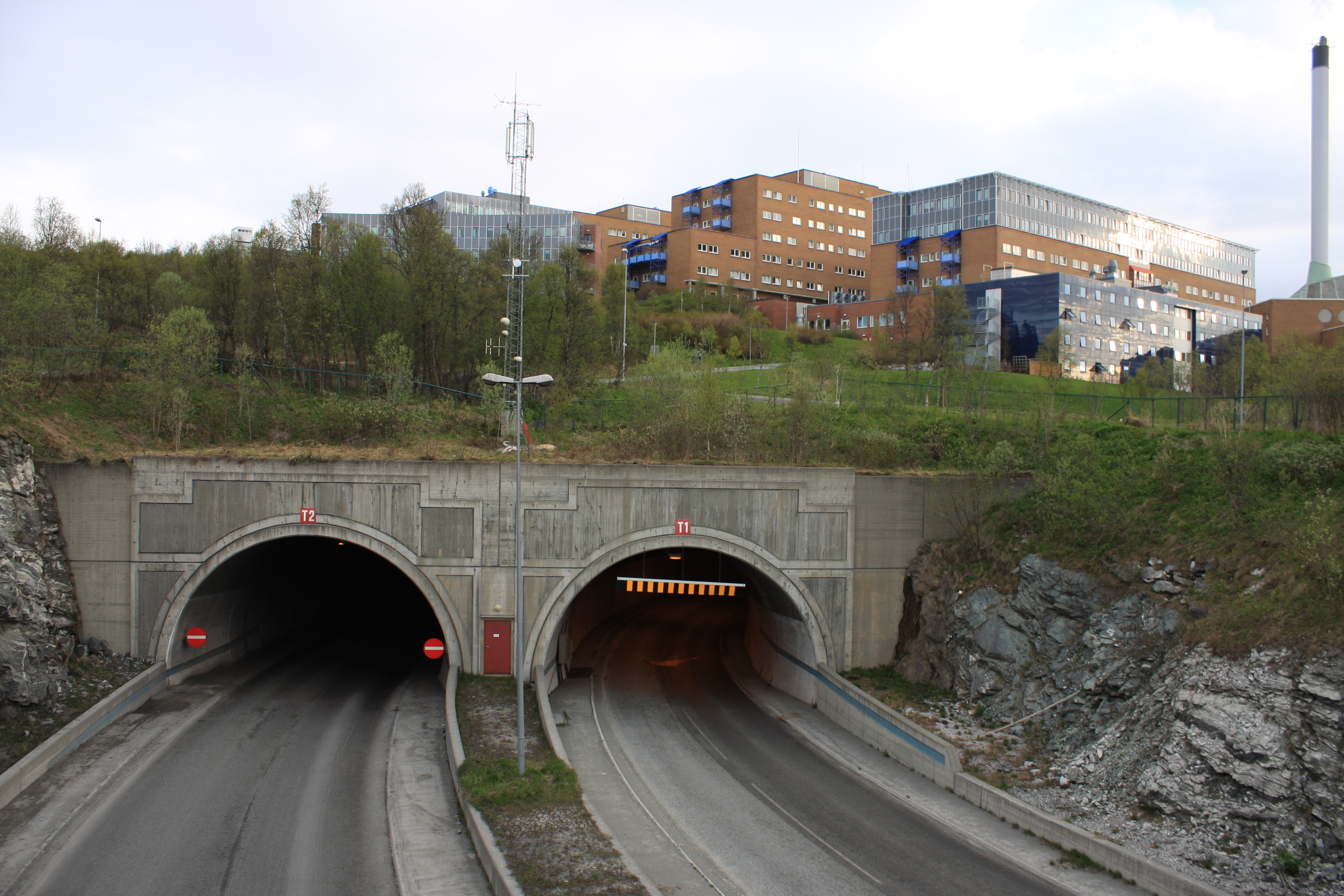
- The tunnel entrance on the Tromsøya-side in Breivika with the University Hospital of North Norway seen in the background.
- Interactive map of Tromsøysund Tunnel (Tromsøysundtunnelen)

Overview
- Location: Tromsø, Troms, Norway
- Coordinates: 69°40′27″N 19°00′32″E
- Route: E8

Operation
- Opened: 3 December 1994
- Character: Automotive

Technical
- Length: 3,500 m (11,500 ft; 2.2 mi)
- No. of lanes: 4 (two each direction)
- Min elevation: −102 metres (−335 ft)
- Grade: 8.2%

The Tromsøysund Tunnel (Norwegian: Tromsøysundtunnelen) is an undersea highway tunnel in Tromsø Municipality in Troms county, Norway. The tunnel runs under the Tromsøysundet strait, connecting the island of Tromsøya (and the city of Tromsø) with the mainland suburb of Tromsdalen.

The tunnel is part of European route E08, (whose northern terminus is on the island itself) and it consists of two tubes, each with two driving lanes. The two tubes are not equal in length; one tube is 3,500 metres (2.2 mi) long and the other is 3,386 metres (2.1 mi) long. The lowest point in the tunnels is 102 metres (335 ft) below sea level, and the maximum grade is 8.2%. The two tubes are linked by 15 service-tunnels.

The tunnel opened on 3 December 1994 to relieve Tromsøya's only other mainland connection, the Tromsø Bridge, which had been plagued by severe traffic congestion for more than a decade. The tunnel is located to the north of the bridge; on the island side it emerges just below the University of Tromsø and the University Hospital of North Norway, both major sources of traffic between the island and the mainland; on the mainland side it emerges at Tomasjord, which is centrally located between the densely populated suburbs of Tromsdalen and Kroken.

== See also ==
- List of tunnels in Norway
