= Olaf Martin Kolsum =

Norwegian politician

- Born: 9 July 1873; Skogn, Norway
- Died: 1 May 1962 (aged 88)
- Occupations: Merchant; Politician

Olaf Martin Kolsum (9 July 1873 – 1 May 1962) was a Norwegian merchant and politician.

He was born in Skogn to Karl Peter Olsen Kolsum and Anne Cecilie Hansen, and settled in Tromsø. He was elected representative to the Storting for the period 1937–1945, for the Liberal Party. He served as mayor of Tromsø in 1915 and from 1922 to 1925.
