= Grøtsundet =

Strait in Troms, Norway

Grøtsundet (Norwegian); Ruohtnuorri (Northern Sami)
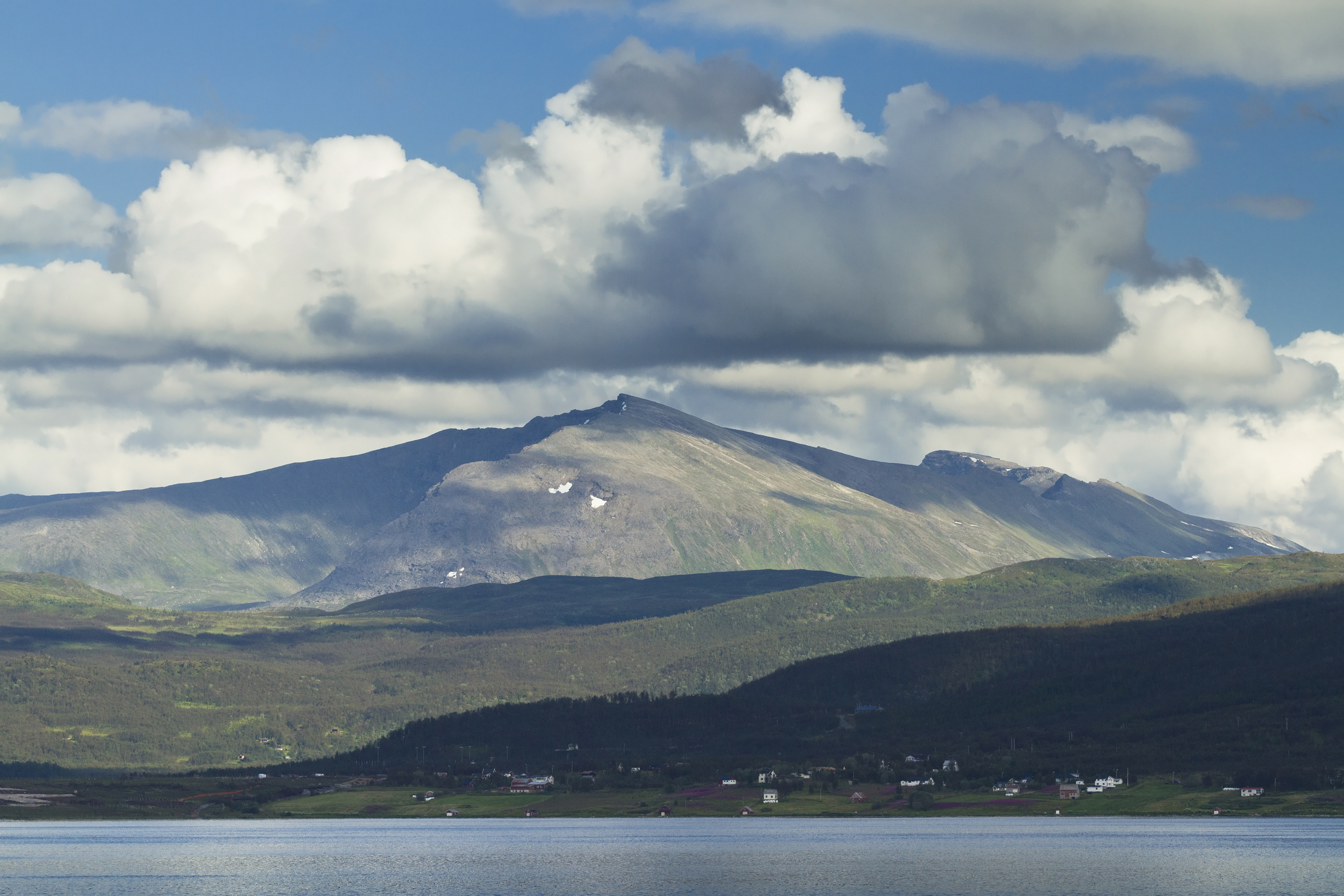
- View of Nonstinden (Rundfjellet) and Finnheimfjellet viewed across Grøtsundet, from Kvaløya
- Interactive map of the strait
- Location: Troms county, Norway
- Coordinates: 69.7789°N 19.1524°E
- Type: Strait
- Basin countries: Norway
- Max. length: 25 kilometres (16 mi)
- Max. width: 4–5 kilometres (2.5–3.1 mi)

Grøtsundet (Norwegian) or Ruohtnuorri (Northern Sami) is a strait between Tromsø Municipality and Karlsøy Municipality in Troms county, Norway. The 25-kilometre (16 mi) long strait separates the islands of Reinøya and Ringvassøya from the mainland to the south. The strait has a width of 4–5 kilometres (2.5–3.1 mi). The strait is one of the main shipping lanes into the city of Tromsø, which lies about 10 kilometres (6.2 mi) southwest of the strait.
