= Jøvika =

Village in Tromsø Municipality, Norway

Jøvika: Jøvika (Norwegian); Čietnjalluokta (Northern Sami); Jøvik (historic name)
- Village
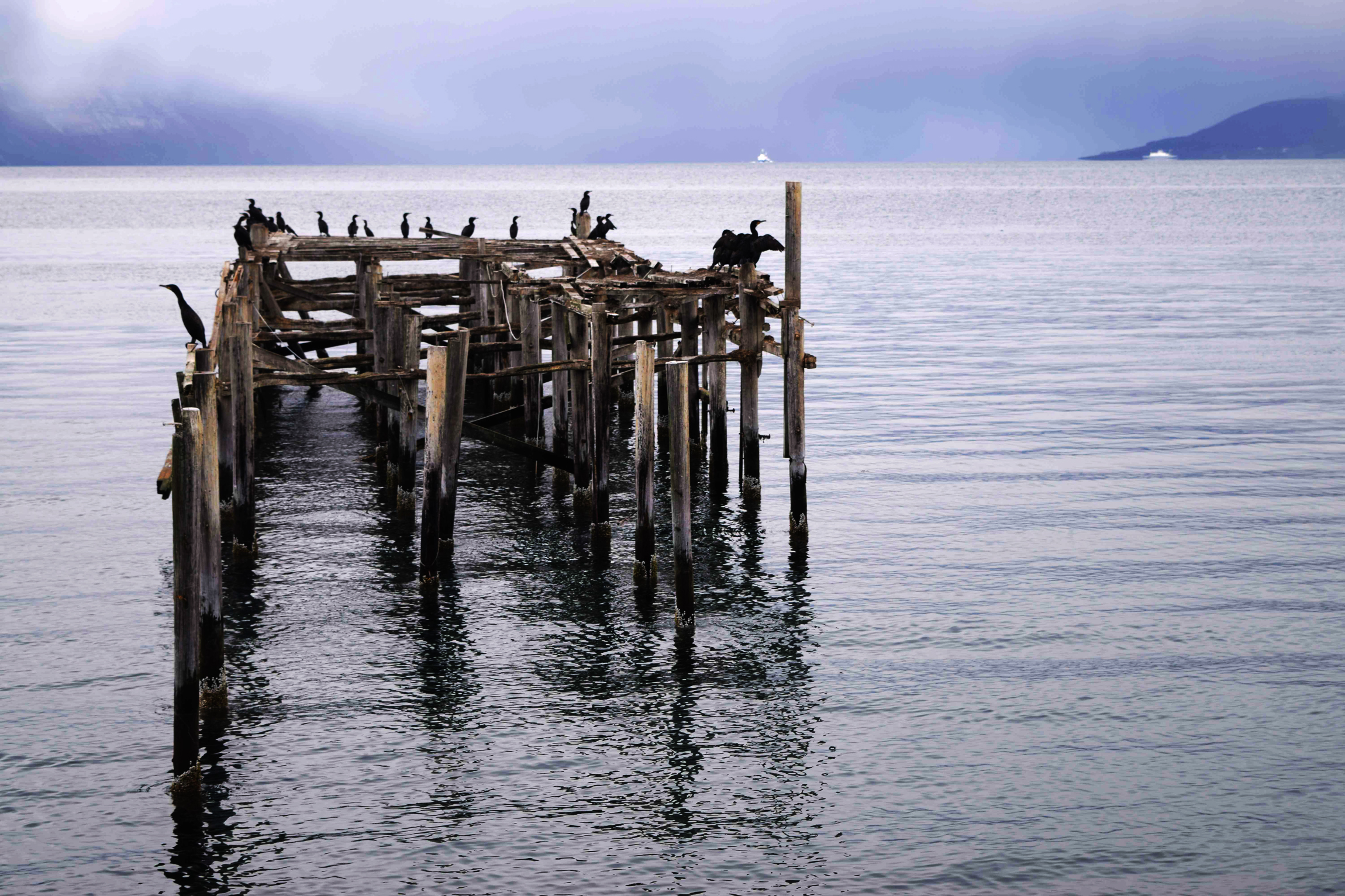
- View of a great cormorant on the historic Jøvik trading pier (2014)
- Interactive map of Jøvika
- Location within Troms Location within Norway
- Coordinates: 69.6043°N 19.8138°E
- Country: Norway
- Region: Northern Norway
- County: Troms
- District: Hålogaland
- Municipality: Tromsø Municipality
- Elevation: 14 m (46 ft)
- Time zone: UTC+01:00 (CET)
  - Summer (DST): UTC+02:00 (CEST)
- Post Code: 9043 Jøvik

Jøvika (Norwegian) or Čietnjalluokta (Northern Sami) is a village in Tromsø Municipality in Troms county, Norway. The village is located along the Ullsfjorden on the Lyngen peninsula, about 35 kilometres (22 mi) east of the city of Tromsø, but it is about 100 kilometres (62 mi) to drive there. The proposed Ullsfjord Bridge would cross the Ullsfjorden near Jøvika, reducing the travel time to central Tromsø by half. The village has road access via the Fv293 road to the village of Lakselvbukt to the south and further to the European route E8 highway. Before the road was built in the 1970s a ferry went from Jøvik to Breivikeidet.

Jøvika (or Jøvik as it used to be called) was one of the largest villages in the former Ullsfjord Municipality. Jøvik Chapel was built in 1920. The Jøvik Sildolje & Kraftforfabrik [Jøvik herring oil & concentrates factory] was based here, which in the 1970s was the country's second largest herring factory, but was closed in 1996. The subsequent decades have been characterised by a declining and ageing population. In 2018, there were about 36 residents in Jøvika.
