= Celebrity Race Across the World series 1 =

First series of Celebrity Race Across the World

Celebrity Race Across the World
- Series 1
- Presented by: John Hannah (narrator)
- No. of days: 28
- No. of contestants: 8
- Winners: Alex and Noel Beresford
- No. of legs: 6
- Distance traveled: 10,000 km (6,200 mi)
- No. of episodes: 6

Release
- Original network: BBC One
- Original release: 20 September – 25 October 2023

Season chronology
- Next → Series 2

The first series of Celebrity Race Across the World was first announced on 3 October 2019, but production was subsequently delayed due to the COVID-19 pandemic.

Start and end points
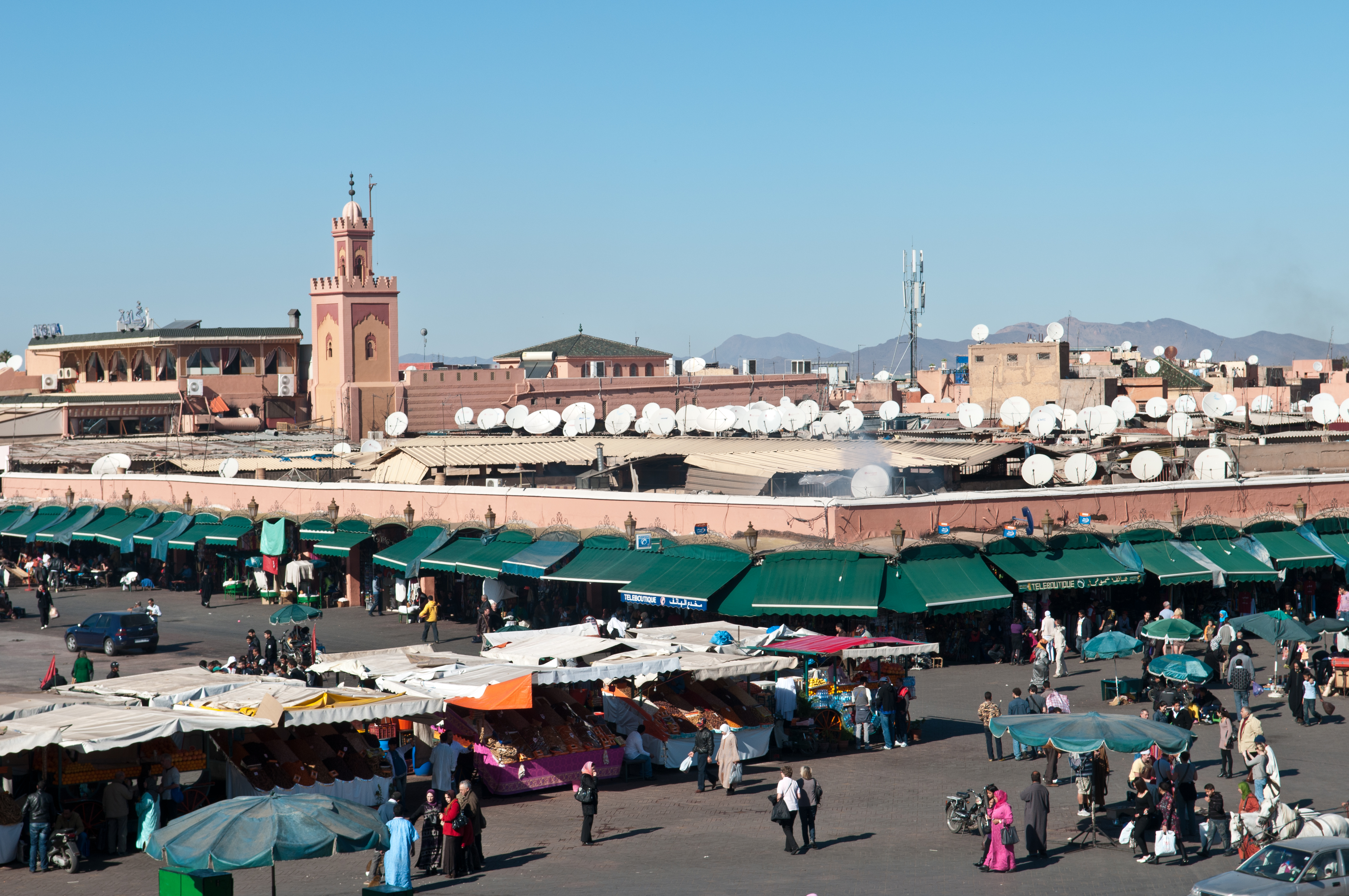
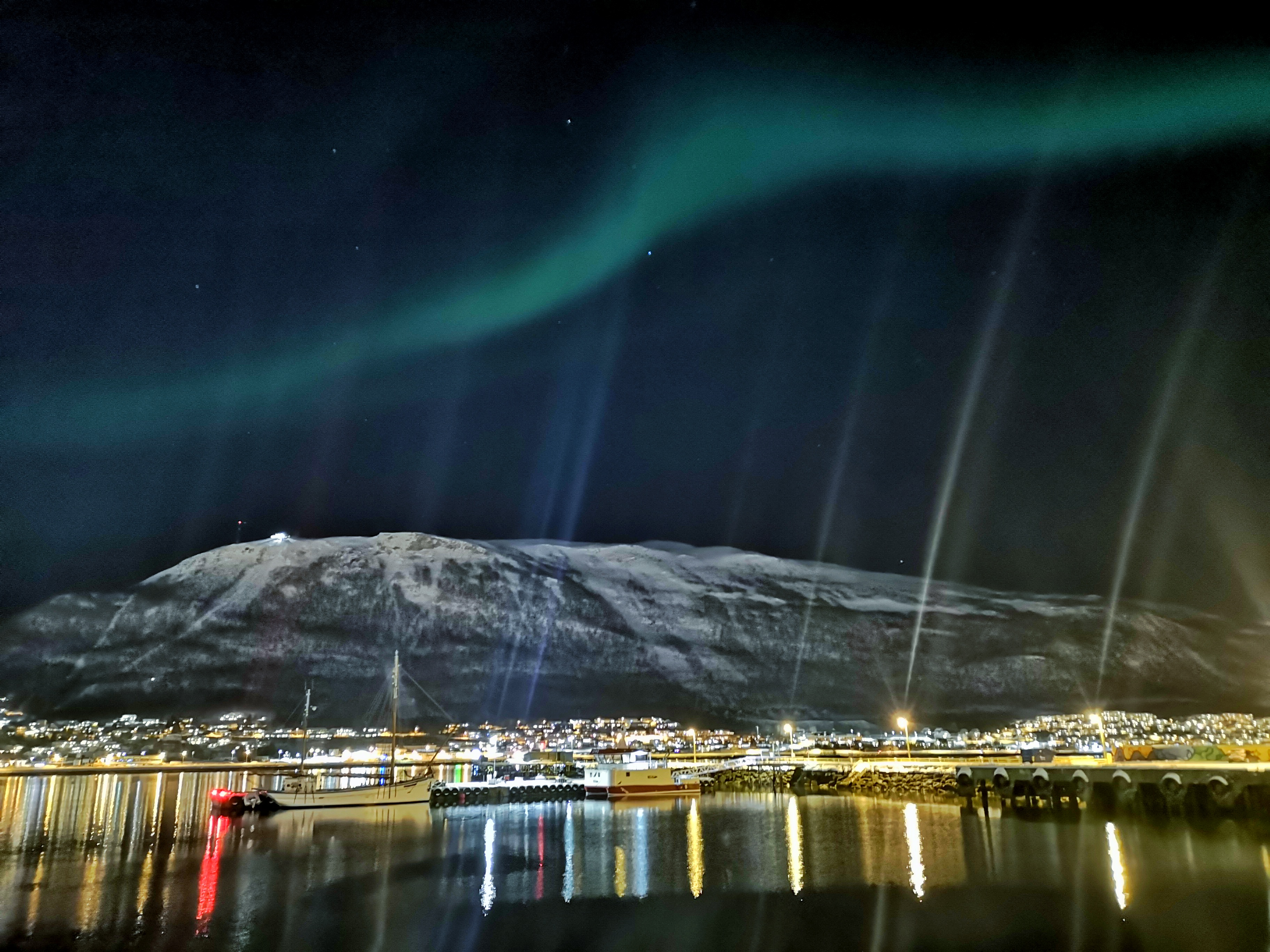
Jemaa el-Fnaa in Marrakesh, Morocco (top) and Fjellheisen observation deck in Tromsø, Norway (bottom)

On 27 July 2023, the BBC announced that the delayed celebrity version would air later that same year and revealed a route spanning 24 countries and over 10,000 kilometres (6,200 mi) starting in Marrakesh, Morocco and finishing in Tromsø, Norway.

In the same press release the BBC announced that the series would consist of 6 hour-long episodes and revealed the four pairs of competitors as weather presenter Alex Beresford and his father, Noel; former All Saints singer Melanie Blatt and her mother, Helene; McFly drummer Harry Judd and his mother, Emma and former British F4 Racing Driver Billy Monger and his sister, Bonny.

Celebrity Race Across the World had been planned for broadcast on 13 September 2023; however, the BBC announced its postponement due to the earthquakes in Marrakesh, where the show had been filmed prior to the disaster which killed over 2,500 people.

== Overview ==
The first celebrity series of Race Across the World was a race between Marrakesh, Morocco and Tromsø, Norway spanning 24 countries and over 10,000 kilometres (6,200 mi).

The race had five checkpoints with enforced rest periods, with contestants only finding out the next destination on departure from a checkpoint. Teams were given a budget of £1947 per person – the equivalent air fare for travelling the race route. Contestants were not permitted to subsidise their budgets, but short-term opportunities allowed them to work for money or bed and board. The contestants were not allowed access to telephones or the internet, but were provided with a map, travel guide and GPS tracker.

== Contestants ==
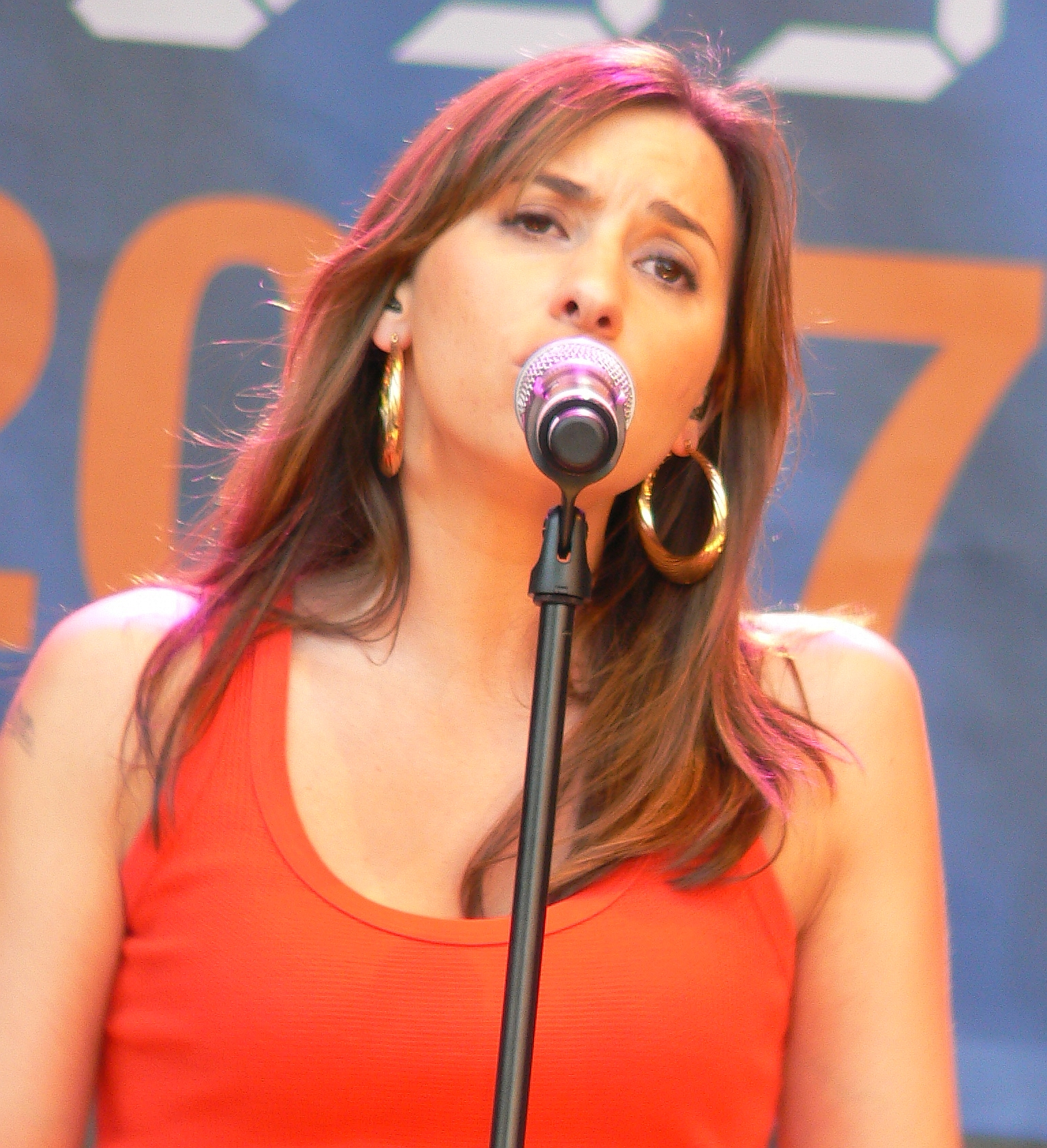
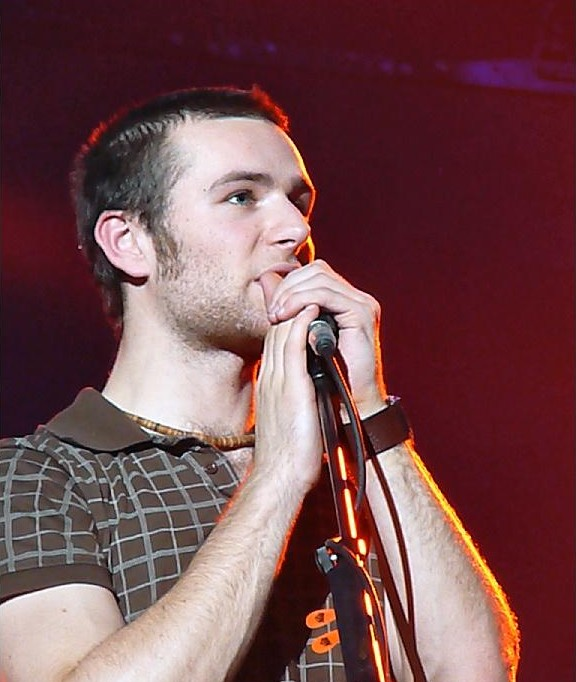
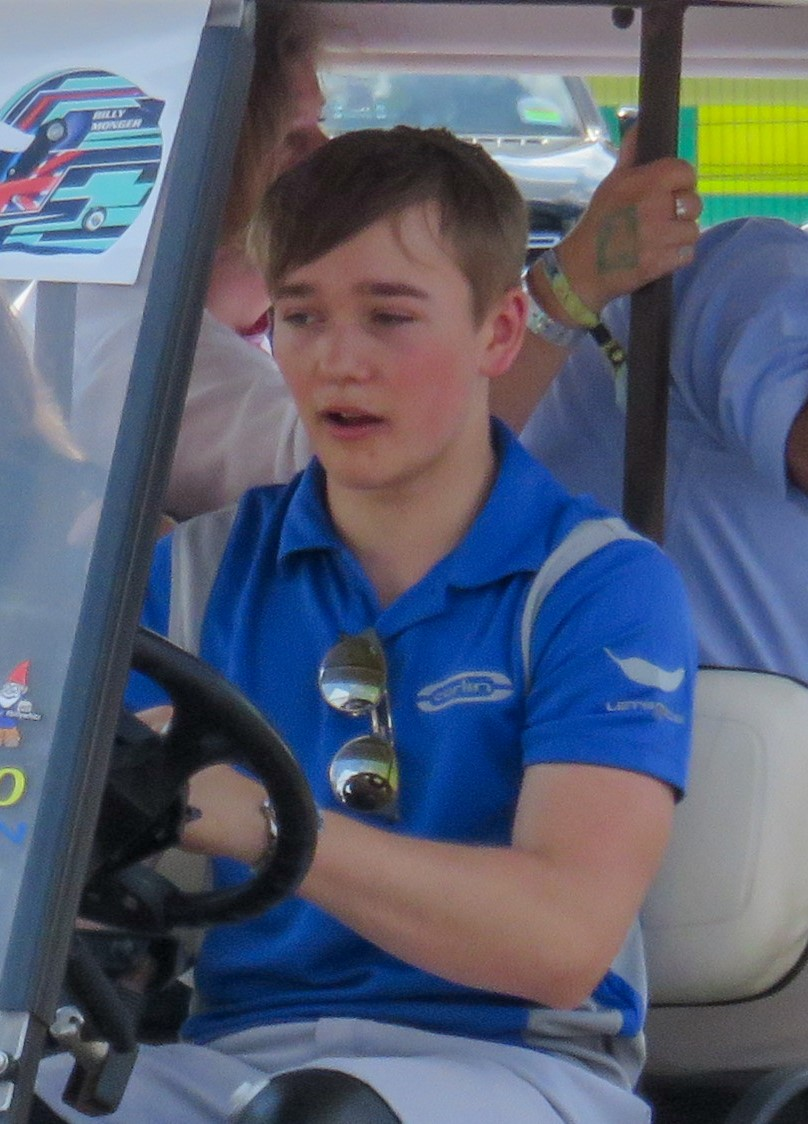
From left to right: Melanie Blatt, Harry Judd and Billy Monger

Name	Relationship	Occupation	Age	Travel essentials	Ref.
Alex Beresford	Father and son	Weather presenter, broadcaster	42	Grooming equipment (including cut-throat razor)	
Noel Beresford	Father and son	Retired engineer	67	Puzzle books	
Melanie Blatt	Mother and daughter	Singer	48	Wet wipes and cigarettes	
Helene Blatt	Mother and daughter	Retired business owner	71	Swiss Army knife and compass	
Harry Judd	Mother and son	Musician	37	Drum sticks and letters from family	
Emma Judd	Mother and son	Retired nurse	63	Tapestry kit and family gifts	
Billy Monger	Siblings	Racing driver, broadcaster	24	Unknown	
Bonny Monger	Siblings	Make-up artist	23	Fake tan	

== Results summary ==
Colour key:

– Team withdrawn
– Series winners

Teams	Position (by leg)					
Teams	1	2	3	4	5	6
Alex & Noel	3rd	4th	2nd	2nd	2nd	Winners
Harry & Emma	4th	1st	1st	1st	4th	2nd
Melanie & Helene	1st	2nd	4th	4th	3rd	3rd
Billy & Bonny	2nd	3rd	3rd	2nd	1st	DNF

== Route ==
The checkpoints in the first celebrity series were:

Leg	From	To
1	Jemaa el-Fnaa; Marrakesh, Morocco	Quinta De La Rosa; Pinhão, Portugal
2	Quinta De La Rosa; Pinhão, Portugal	Hotel Genovese; Bonifacio, Corsica, France
3	Hotel Genovese; Bonifacio, Corsica, France	Backstage Hotel; Zermatt, Switzerland
4	Backstage Hotel; Zermatt, Switzerland	Isa Begov Hamam i Hotel; Sarajevo, Bosnia and Herzegovina
5	Isa Begov Hamam i Hotel; Sarajevo, Bosnia and Herzegovina	Hotel Adlon; Berlin, Germany
6	Hotel Adlon; Berlin, Germany	Fjellheisen observation deck Tromsø, Norway

Checkpoints on Celebrity Series 1: Checkpoint, Start, Finish
Checkpoints on Celebrity Series 1: Checkpoint, Start, Finish

== Race summary ==
Mode of transportation	Rail Ship Bus/coach Taxi Road vehicle Self-drive vehicle (paid) RV
Activity	Working for money and/or bed and board Excursion that cost time and/or money

=== Leg 1: Marrakesh, Morocco → Pinhão, Portugal ===
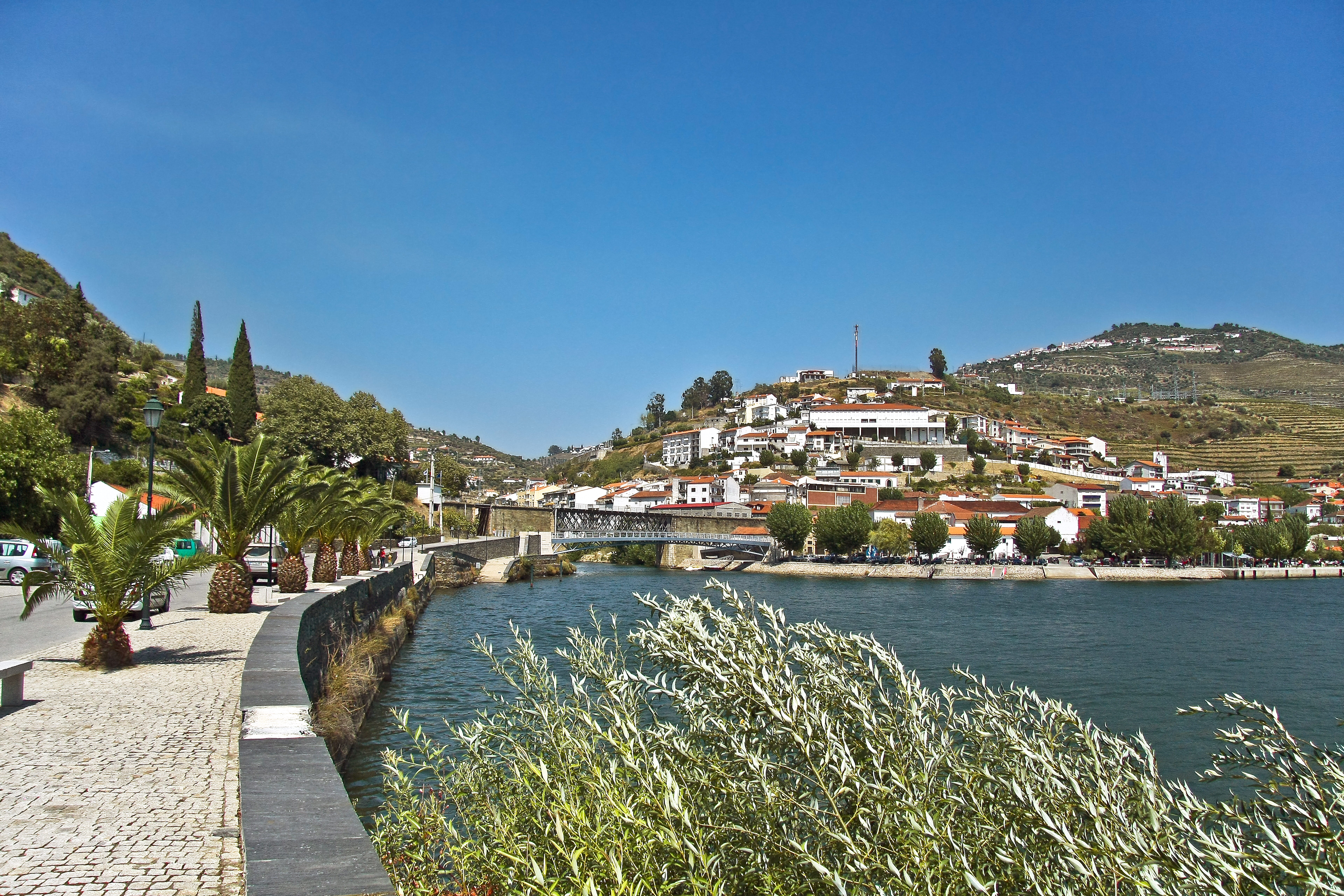
Pinhão, Portugal

Having checked in at Medersa Ben Yousseff, the race started in earnest at 2 pm from Jemaa el-Fnaa in Marrakesh, Morocco with the first leg finishing 2,000 kilometres (1,200 mi) north at Quinta De La Rosa, outside the town of Pinhão, in the heart of Portugal's Douro Valley.

To reach Europe all the teams had to first plan their way to the port city of Tangier and then cross the Strait of Gibraltar. Whilst the other teams walked to Bab Doukkala bus station, Melanie and Helene got off to a head start by taking a taxi and catching the first bus to Tangier, a journey of almost nine hours.

Billy and Bonny, wanting to experience something of North Africa decided to travel to Fez by bus to work in the Sidi Moussa tannery. Harry and Emma also elected to experience local culture and selected a homestay with a Jebala family, working at their apiary in the city of Chefchaouen in the Rif mountains in exchange for free food and lodgings.

With differing opinions on the best strategy, Alex and Noel were the last to leave Marrakesh having spent the first day exploring the city and eventually took an overnight bus to Tangier some seven hours behind Melanie and Helene. They reached Tangier and took the first ferry across to Algeciras in Andalusia, Spain only to discover they had caught up with Melanie and Helene who were also on the same sailing.

One by one all the teams made landfall in Spain and all decided to travel onward to Seville. Whilst most of the teams took the bus, Melanie once again opted to splash out on a taxi having failed to secure a bus. She and Helene then took a train to Lisbon where they worked a shift in a Fado bar before taking another train to Porto. Harry and Emma later followed in their footsteps taking the same route. From Seville, the other two teams struck out for Madrid. On arrival in the Spanish capital, Alex and Noel immediately headed to Salamanca by bus and found that the onward bus through the Serra de Estrela mountains and into Viseu the next day was coming from Madrid; a bus on which Billy and Bonny were already on board. In Viseu, Bonny tried unsuccessfully to make contact with an old friend, in the meantime, confused by the one hour time difference between Spain and Portugal, Alex and Noel forwent the first available bus under the impression it had already departed and waited two hours for the next service. Once again the two teams found themselves on the same bus, this time to Pinhão. In an effort to beat Alex and Noel to the checkpoint, Billy and Bonny alighted the bus short of Viseu and took a taxi to the town, only to find the other pair already heading to the checkpoint, but a mistake by Alex and Noel allowed Billy and Bonny to just pip them to the post.

Melanie and Helene travelled from Porto to Pinhão by train, but Harry and Emma took a cab as they stood to gain two hours by not waiting for the next service. Upon arrival they discovered they were the last team to check in, some 4 hours behind the race leaders, Melanie and Helene.

Order	Teams	Route	Hours behind leaders	Money left
1	Melanie & Helene	Marrakesh → Tangier → Algeciras → Seville → Lisbon → Porto → Pinhão	—N/a	85%
2	Billy & Bonny	Marrakesh → Fez → Tangier → Algeciras → Seville → Madrid → Viseu → Pinhão	59 minutes	86%
3	Alex & Noel	Marrakesh → Tangier → Algeciras → Seville → Madrid → Salamanca → Viseu → Pinhão	61 minutes	82%
4	Harry & Emma	Marrakesh → Chefchaouen → Tangier → Algeciras → Seville → Lisbon → Porto → Pinhão	4 hours	81%

=== Leg 2: Pinhão, Portugal → Bonifacio, Corsica ===
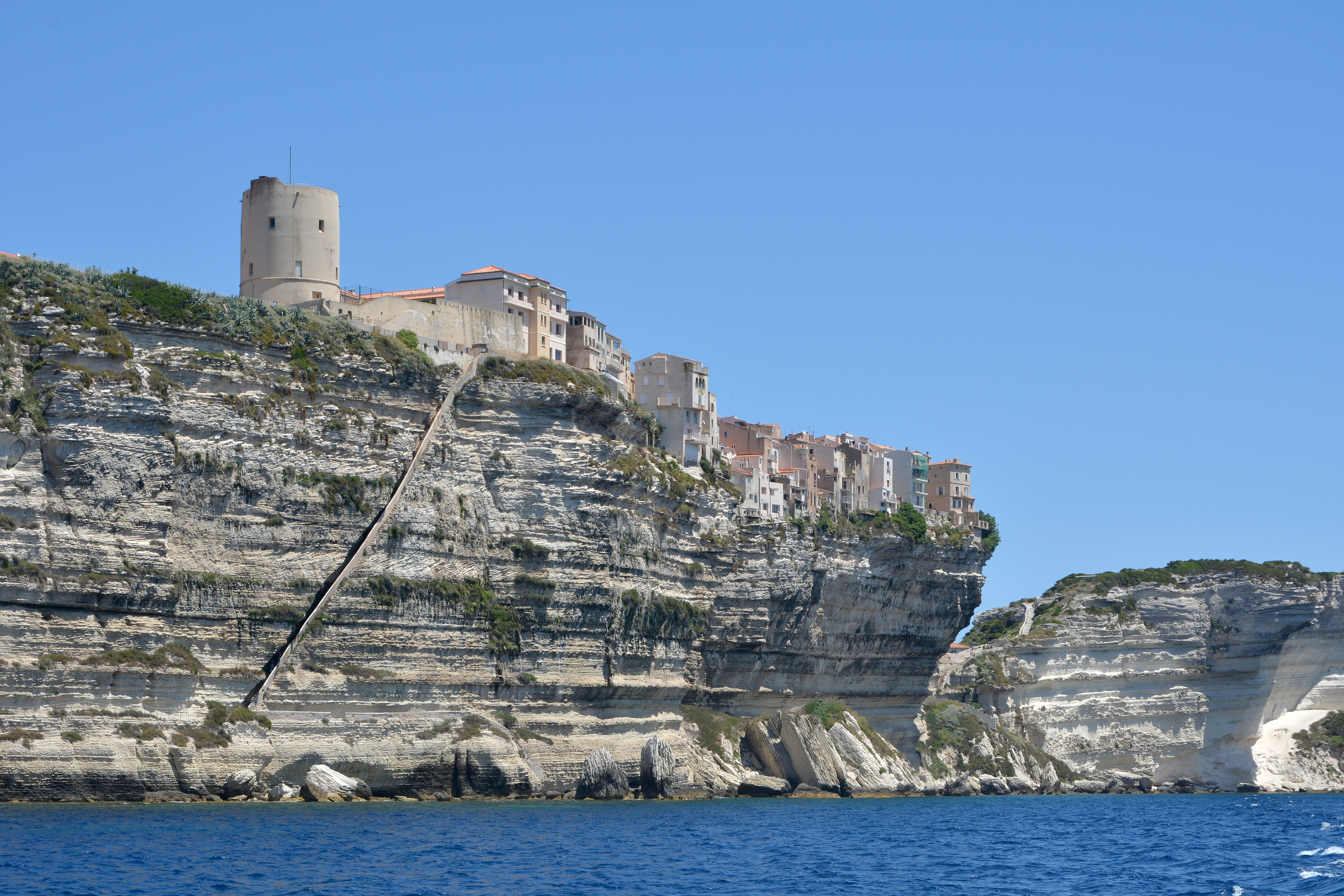
Bonifacio, Corsica

The race continued on day 6 from Pinhão in Portugal's Douro Valley to the coastal town of Bonifacio, over 2,000 kilometres (1,200 mi) east on the southern tip of the island of Corsica in the Mediterranean.

Melanie and Helene were the first to leave, at 6.15am. They hitched a lift to the bus station with the intent of getting the first bus to Vila Real but having missed the morning service they decided not to wait and once again opted for a taxi. From there they took a bus to Donostia-San Sebastian in the Basque Country close to the border with France where they found work on a sheep farm during lambing season.

The other three teams all headed west to Porto by train, where Harry and Emma found the time to take in the sights of Porto Cathedral. They then travelled directly to Madrid as did Billy and Bonny, albeit on different bus services; however, Alex and Noel detoured to Santiago de Compostela in Galicia first for a work opportunity in a seafood restaurant. From Madrid, Harry and Emma headed straight to Barcelona via the Madrid-Barcelona high-speed train in an attempt to make up some time, whilst Billy and Bonny detoured to Tarragona via train where they accompanied a squid fisherman in an effort to replenish their funds subject to the size of their catch.

Still in the Basque country, Melanie and Helene crossed the border into France at Hendaye from where they took multiple trains to reach the ferry port at Toulon. En route they met some fellow brits who made a contribution to their race funds.

Having failed to catch any squid and therefore with no extra funds, Billy and Bonny decided on economy over speed and took a bus from Barcelona to Marseille, instead of the much quicker but much costlier train which Harry and Emma had utilised after taking in the city's Gaudi buildings including the Sagrada Familia. Alex and Noel also found themselves taking the bus from Barcelona to Marseille as all train services were fully booked for two days by the time of their arrival at Barcelona Sants railway station. The other three teams caught the same overnight ferry crossing from Toulon to Ajaccio on Corsica and once on board tried to secure lifts to Bonifacio from fellow passengers, with only Billy and Bonny unsuccessful, forcing them to hitch multiple lifts.

Whilst three teams reached the second checkpoint on day 9, Alex and Noel were lagging behind by twenty-six hours.

Order	Teams	Route	Hours behind leaders	Money left
1	Harry & Emma	Pinhão → Porto → Madrid → Barcelona → Toulon → Ajaccio → Bonifacio	—N/a	63%
2	Melanie & Helene	Pinhão → Vila Real → Donostia-San Sebastian → Hendaye → Toulon → Ajaccio → Bonifacio	30 minutes	64%
3	Billy & Bonny	Pinhão → Porto → Madrid → Tarragona → Barcelona → Marseille → Toulon → Ajaccio → Bonifacio	3 hours	68%
4	Alex & Noel	Pinhão → Porto → Santiago de Compostela → Madrid → Barcelona → Marseille → Toulon → Ajaccio	26 hours	61%

=== Leg 3: Bonifacio, Corsica → Zermatt, Switzerland ===
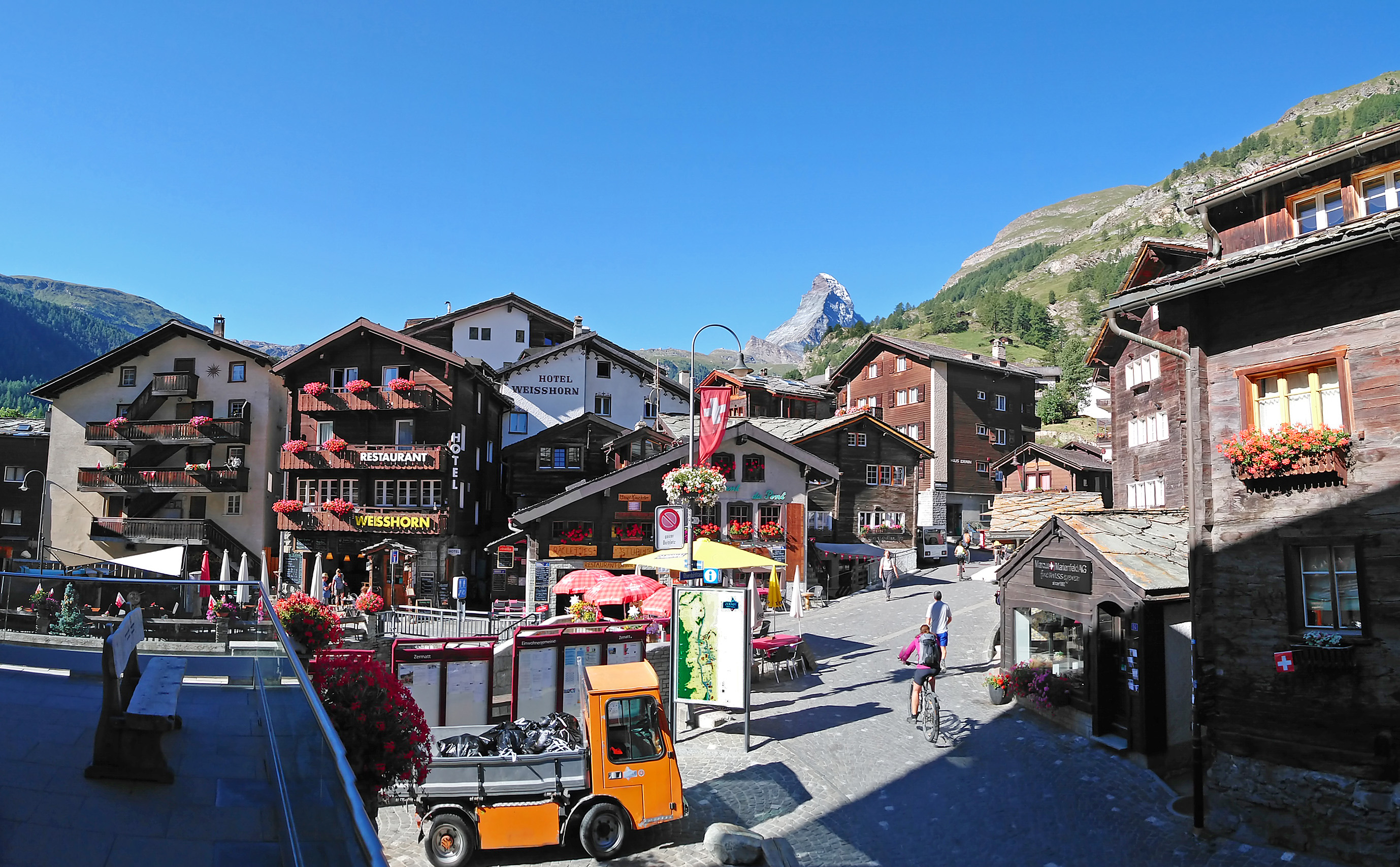
Zermatt, Switzerland

The race continued on day 11 from the coastal town of Bonifacio on the southern tip of the island of Corsica in the Mediterranean to car-free Zermatt, high in the Swiss Alps situated 900 kilometres (560 mi) to the north.

With three teams leaving on the rest day of Sunday, the lack of public transport forced Billy & Bonny and Harry & Emma to each take taxis to the port of Bastia, whilst Melanie and Helene eventually hitched a lift. With an option to either traverse through Italy or France, Harry and Emma decided on the former, whilst Melanie and Helene opted for the latter due to their fluency in the language and a friend in Nice who might prove useful. Billy and Bonny also opted for France and found themselves on the same ferry service to Nice on the Côte d'Azur as Melanie and Helene.

On arrival in Livorno, Harry and Emma decided to press on to Tuscany where they had lined up a job opportunity in a Carrara marble sculpting studio. After what seemed a fruitless search, Helene successfully located her friend's apartment and she and Melanie were offered shelter for the night. The next day they spent some time with her and visited Castle Hill to witness the cannon being fired at noon. Whilst there, mother and daughter reflected on the period of their lives when they moved to France for Melanie's Scoliosis treatment.

After departing Bonifacio a day later than the other three teams, Alex and Noel also opted for a cab to Bastia to make up time and took the first ferry available to the European mainland, which made port in Livorno. From there they headed by train to Riomaggiore, one of the Cinque Terre where they worked in a vineyard for bed and board.

Billy and Bonny took a trip to explore the Grotte de Choranche cave system in the Vercors Massif before heading onward to Annecy, where they discovered there were no trains to Geneva that day due to industrial action, a predicament that Melanie and Helene also found themselves facing. Whilst the former team whiled away the hours to the next bus service by exploring the town, the latter took the opportunity to work in an ecocamp in the Semnoz forest for free board with a view to catching a train the next morning. That evening when Billy and Bonny eventually arrived in Geneva they were faced with more problems with the trains, this time cancellations, so were only able to travel as far as Brig.

Having finished in Carrara with lunch consisting of Lardo, Harry & Emma took a train to Milan and then detoured to the Italian lakes and to Lake Como where they had lined up another job opportunity, this time as stablehands in exchange for a horseback tour of the area, before coming back into the city in an attempt to reach Zermatt that same night. They too, however, ran into engineering works on the Brig–Zermatt railway line when attempting to get an onward train from Visp.

Alex and Noel arrived in Milan that evening, too late for the last train. The next day Melanie and Helene missed the first train from Annecy, delaying them a few hours. Unbeknownst to either team, Harry and Emma had already reached the checkpoint the night before, on day 13.

Order	Teams	Route	Hours behind leaders	Money left
1	Harry & Emma	Bonifacio → Bastia → Livorno → Carrara → Milan → Lake Como → Milan → Visp → Zermatt	—N/a	47%
2	Alex & Noel	Bonifacio → Bastia → Livorno → Riomaggiore → Milan → Zermatt	12 hours	45%
3	Billy & Bonny	Bonifacio → Bastia → Nice → Vercors → Annecy → Geneva → Brig → Visp → Tasch → Zermatt	13.5 hours	43%
4	Melanie & Helene	Bonifacio → Bastia → Nice → Annecy → Zermatt	17.5 hours	49%

=== Leg 4: Zermatt, Switzerland → Sarajevo, Bosnia and Herzegovina ===
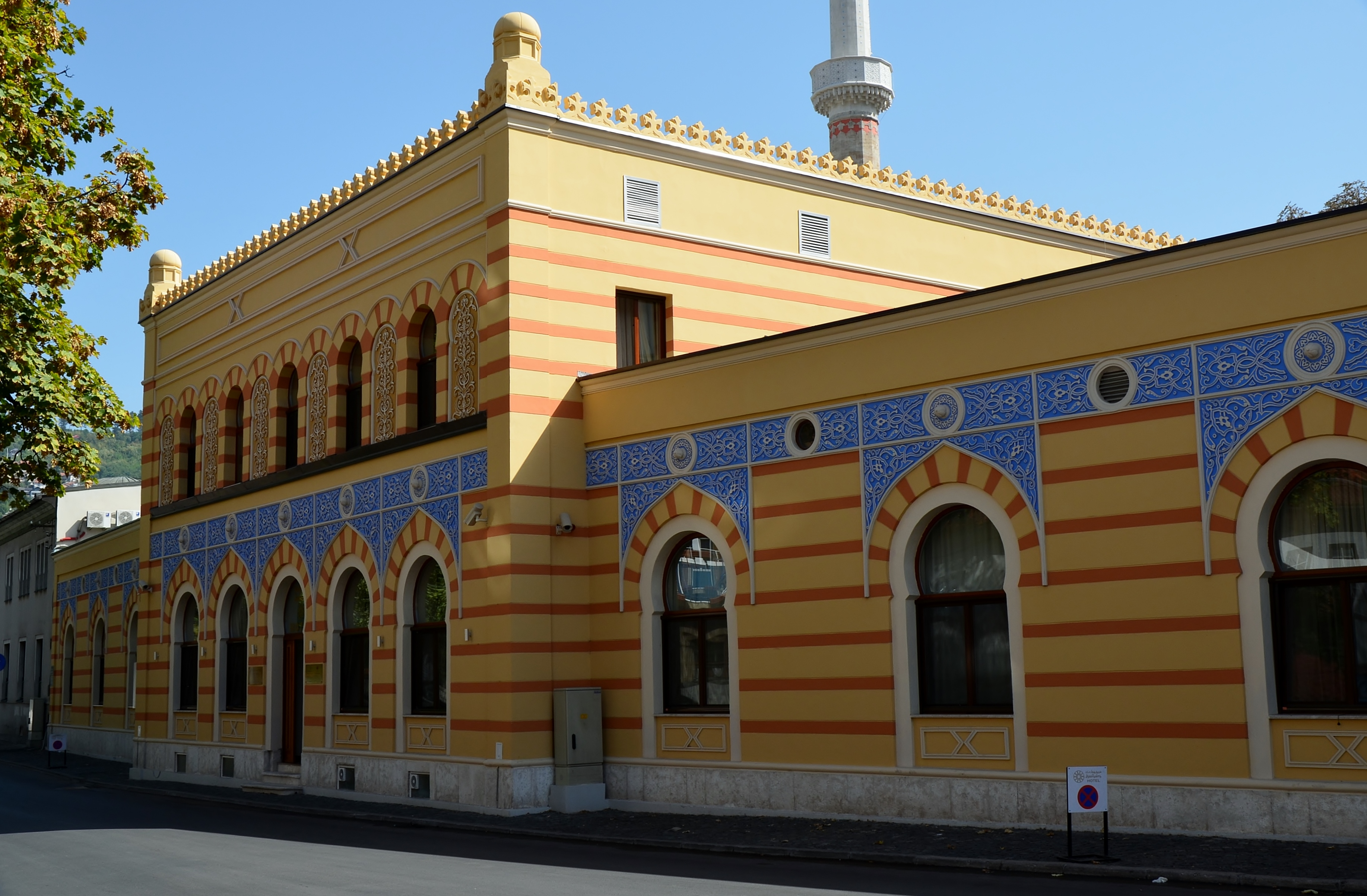
Hotel Isa Begov, Sarajevo

The race continued on day 15 from Zermatt in the shadow of the Matterhorn to Sarajevo, capital of Bosnia and Herzegovina, over 1,200 kilometres (750 mi) away in former Yugoslavia.

Harry and Emma decided on a route that initially took them through Austria and they booked a direct train to Innsbruck in the Tyrol. Despite only a 12-hour difference between race restart for the first and second placed teams, it was dawn the next day before Alex and Noel could actually depart Zermatt due to a lack of transport in the evenings. They settled on a route by rail and road through Italy and Slovenia that eventually took them to Lake Bled via the Slovenian capital, Ljubljana.

With an eye on their budget, Billy and Bonny decided to head to Italy where they hoped the high frequency and low cost of rail transport would give them an advantage, both in making up time and preserving their remaining funds. They spotted a lucrative work opportunity, weeding at the Giusti Gardens in Verona and boarded a train headed for the Italian city, but a late arrival meant they earned less than anticipated. Italy was also the first port of call for Melanie and Helene who took a train to Milan and then another to the border with Slovenia at Trieste where they found work at a coffee roasters.

Having reached Innsbruck with ease, but on a relatively expensive train, Harry and Emma worked a shift in a street food kitchen, both preparing the food and subsequently manning the food cart. With Harry feeling under the weather, the pair embarked on a 19-hour, overnight coach ride to the Split on the Adriatic coast of Croatia, which was prolonged due to a punctured tyre. With no buses onward to Sarajevo that same day, they opted to work as deckhands on a superyacht before crossing the Dinaric Alps into Bosnia and Herzegovina by coach the following morning, but not before Emma had a word with her son about his timekeeping.

In Slovenia, at the foot of the Julian Alps, Alex and Noel cleaned boats on Lake Bled in return for a free excursion, whilst in Lipica, Billy and Bonny worked at a stud farm that reared white Lipizzans in exchange for a free night's bed and board. Alex and Noel then took an overnight coach to the Croatian capital of Zagreb, from where they intended to take an onward coach straight to Sarajevo. In the morning they bumped into Billy and Bonny and the two teams found themselves on the same service.

Melanie and Helene travelled down the Adriatic coast on a coach, first to Rijeka and then to Zadar, before opting for a taxi inland all the way to Sarajevo in an effort to make up time.

On arrival in Sarajevo, Harry and Emma were surprised to find themselves first at the checkpoint. Eight hours later, Billy, Bonny, Alex and Noel arrived in the city on the same coach. Seeing the extreme discomfort Billy was in, Alex's paternal instincts kicked in and he and his father decided not to abandon the younger pair. Joining forces, both teams arrived at the fourth checkpoint simultaneously and were rewarded with joint second place.

Order	Teams	Route	Hours behind leaders	Money left
1	Harry & Emma	Zermatt → Innsbruck → Split → Sarajevo	—N/a	31%
2	Alex & Noel	Zermatt → Ljubljana → Lake Bled → Zagreb → Sarajevo	8 hours	33%
2	Billy & Bonny	Zermatt → Verona → Lipica → Zagreb → Sarajevo	8 hours	31%
4	Melanie & Helene	Zermatt → Milan → Trieste → Rijeka → Zadar → Sarajevo	10.5 hours	33%

=== Leg 5: Sarajevo, Bosnia and Herzegovina → Berlin, Germany ===
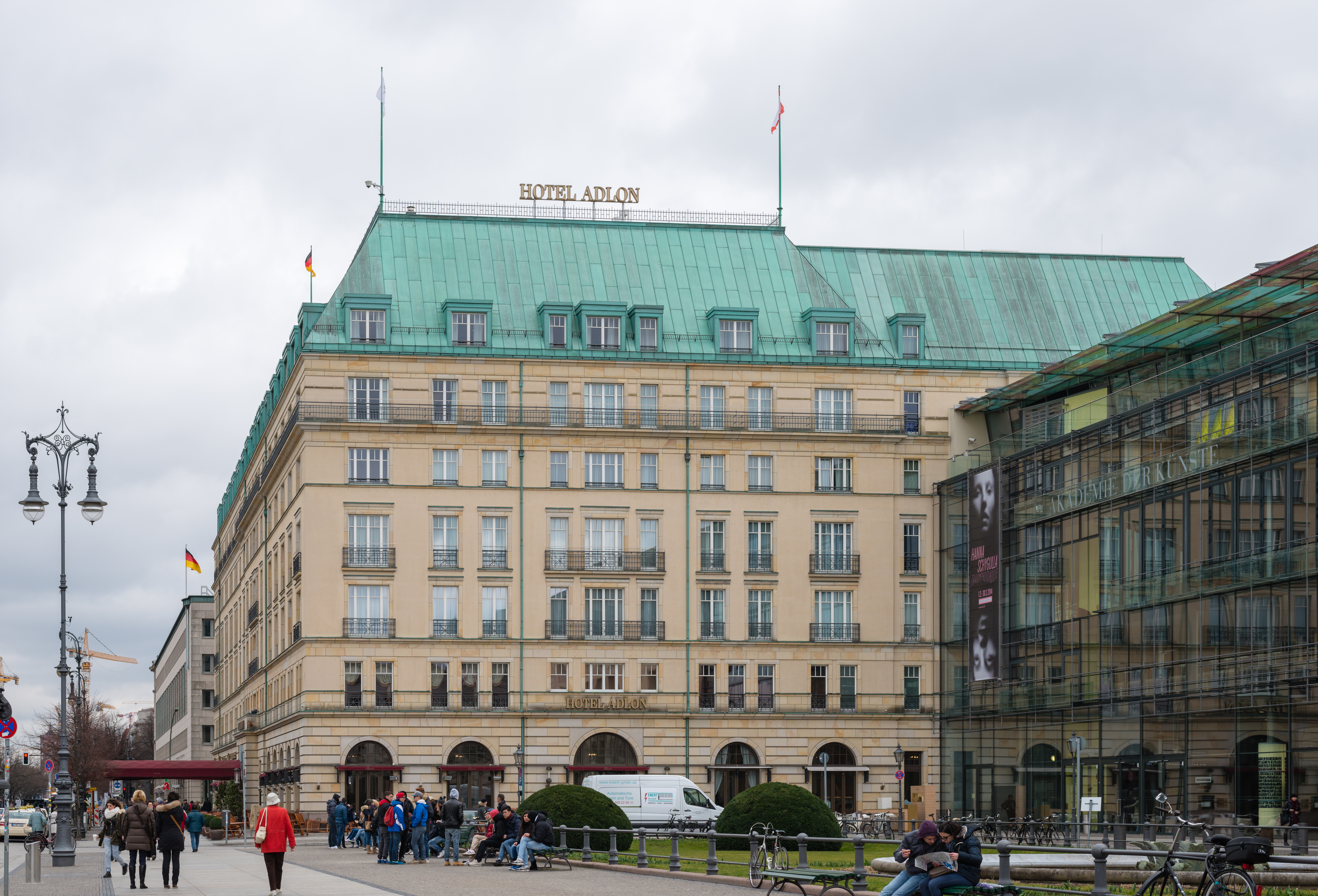
Hotel Adlon, Berlin

The penultimate leg of the race commenced on day 20 from Sarajevo in the Balkans to Berlin, over 1,500 kilometres (930 mi) to the north.

First to leave Sarajevo, Harry and Emma planned a route through Eastern Europe, anticipating costs would be lower and headed first for the Serbian capital of Belgrade by coach en route to Budapest where they hoped to indulge in the city's famous thermal baths. Leaving simultaneously, Billy, Bonny, Alex and Noel parted ways, with the younger duo taking a 15-hour night bus directly to Germany and the Bavarian city of Munich for a job opportunity in a bierkeller, whilst the senior pair struck out for a village called Pusztaszer on the Southern Great Plain of Hungary to work as farm hands in exchange for bed and board.

Last to leave Sarajevo, Melanie and Helene, followed in the footsteps of the race leaders Harry and Emma by selecting the road route to Budapest via Belgrade, albeit some ten and a half hours later, but with the minor bonus of not incurring accommodation costs that night.

All teams undertook some sort of work on this leg to either top up their cash reserves or cover bed and board. On the organic farm in Pusztaszer, Alex and Noel tended the animals including some Mangalica pigs and worked in the fields. In Munich, Billy and Bonny headed to the Augustiner-Keller, where they had roles behind the bar and serving customers, respectively. In Budapest, Harry and Emma worked at the Széchenyi thermal bath complex in exchange for free use of the facilities, whilst Melanie and Helene become housekeeping staff in a hostel. The former pair later visited Heroe's Square whilst the latter took the opportunity to explore family history in Budapest's Jewish Quarter.

From Budapest, Harry and Emma opted to continue through Eastern Europe and forged onward to Kraków in Poland, whilst Melanie and Helene made for Munich, but not before becoming separated in Budapest Keleti station. Convinced Melanie had departed on the train without her, Helene purchased a ticket to the next stop along the line hoping that her daughter might be there and fortunately the pair were reunited. Once in Munich itself they departed straight for Berlin by high-speed rail, whereas Billy and Bonny had strategically decided to head out of Germany and into the Czech Republic to its capital Prague in an attempt to preserve funds; a city that also featured as a waypoint in the travel plans of Alex and Noel once they had reached Budapest from the farm.

At Praha hlavní nádraží, Billy and Bonny bought train tickets direct to Berlin unsure of their position in the race. On arrival at Berlin Hauptbahnhof, they were first instructed to take the S-Bahn to Alexanderplatz and then on alighting, to head past the Reichstag, through the Brandenburg Gate to the Hotel Adlon. On arrival they were delighted to discover they were the first team to reach checkpoint five. Harry and Emma, race leaders for several previous legs, arrived approximately nine hours later and found themselves relegated to last place.

Order	Teams	Route	Hours behind leaders	Money left
1	Billy & Bonny	Sarajevo → Munich → Prague → Berlin	—N/a	21%
2	Alex & Noel	Sarajevo → Pusztaszer → Kistelek → Budapest → Prague → Berlin	6 hours	19%
3	Melanie & Helene	Sarajevo → Belgrade → Budapest → Munich → Berlin	7.5 hours	15%
4	Harry & Emma	Sarajevo → Belgrade → Budapest → Kraków → Berlin	9 hours	19%

=== Leg 6: Berlin, Germany → Tromsø, Norway ===
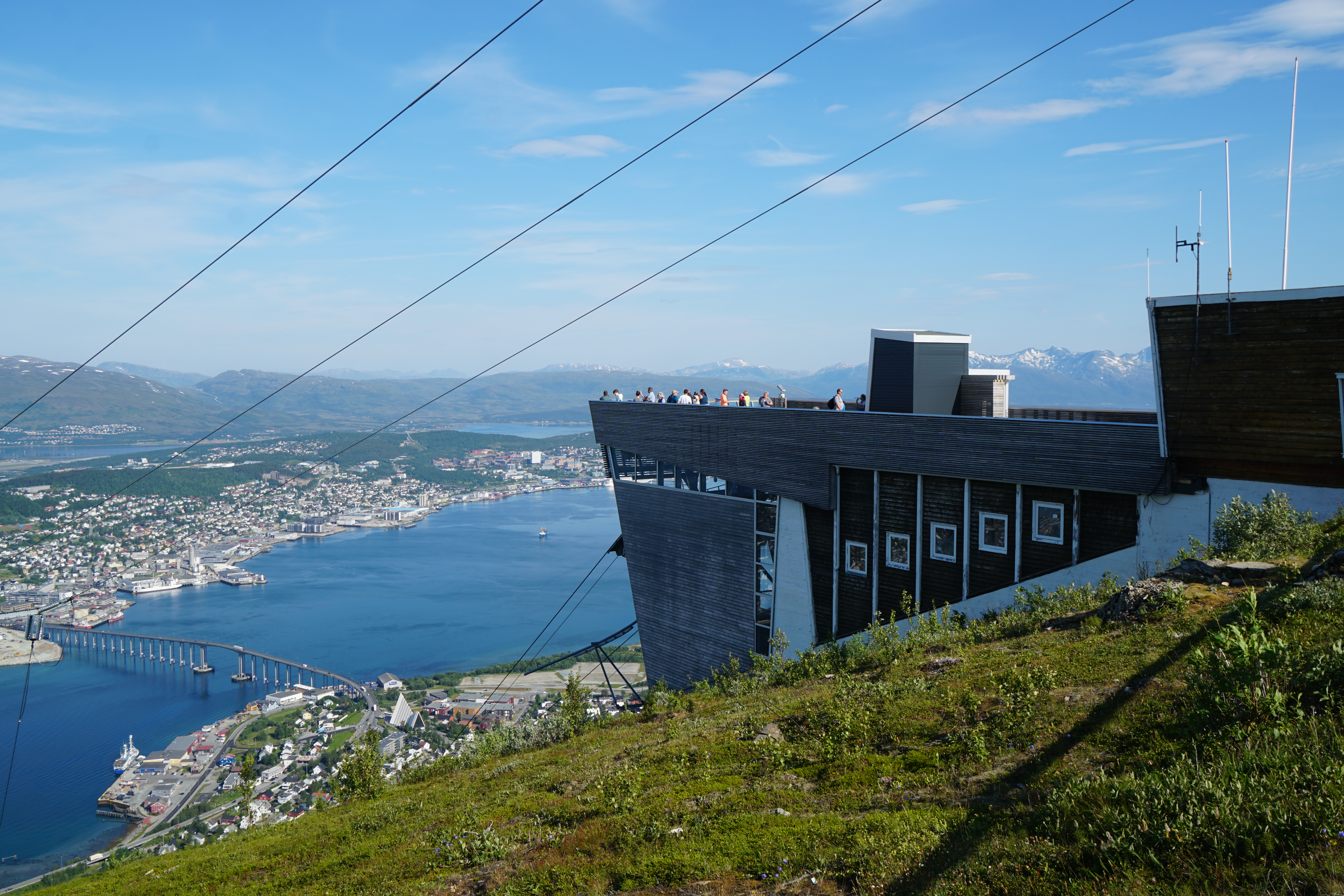
Fjellheisen observation deck, Tromsø

When the final leg of the race restarted on day 25 only three teams remained. A family emergency meant that Billy and Bonny had pulled out of the race to return home instead of journeying from Berlin to the island city of Tromsø in the Arctic Circle, some 2,000 kilometres (1,200 mi) to the north.

Differing strategies saw the three remaining teams heading for three different capital cities. Alex and Noel took an 18-hour bus directly to Stockholm. Harry and Emma initially also decided to head for the capital of Sweden, but gambled that rail transport would be quicker and so commenced their journey with a train to Hamburg. Realising the costly error of their ways, they changed tack and took a cheaper overnight coach from Hamburg to Oslo, capital of Norway. Meanwhile, Melanie and Helene opted to travel through the Baltic states with their first port of call being Tallinn, capital of Estonia, where they then secured free passage on a ferry across the Gulf of Finland to Helsinki by working in the duty-free shop on board the vessel.

To boost their funds, Alex and Noel worked a shift clearing snow at a lakeside sauna in Stockholm and then boarded a train from Stockholm Central Station to Jukkasjärvi in Swedish Lapland. In Oslo, Harry and Emma had six hours to kill so used their downtime to work in a fish processing factory after which they took an overnight train from Oslo Sentralstasjon to Fauske. Also looking to boost funds, Melanie and Helene caught an overnight train from Helsinki to Oulu for a job at a dog kennel, but splashed out on a sleeping berth despite their ever-dwindling budget.

In Fauske, Harry and Emma decided they wanted to spend the night in proper beds, but to achieve this they had to help land the day's catch in exchange for bed and board. Whilst out fishing on Skjerstad Fjord they spotted sea eagles. Alex and Noel also encountered the local wildlife in the form of Reindeer at a Sámi outpost where they bedded down for the night in a Lavvu. When Harry learned of an opportunity to head further into Nordland that same evening, he convinced his mother to forgo the free night's accommodation and the pair caught the evening bus to Narvik propelling them into the lead. The next morning, upon learning that there were no buses to Tromsø until the afternoon the pair attempted to hitch a lift but were unsuccessful. On the bus they found themselves reunited with Alex and Noel.

Melanie and Helene approached Tromsø from Rovaniemi by bus, down to their last 25 euros. Once in the city all teams received instructions to head first by any means to the Arctic Cathedral, 3 kilometres (1.9 mi) away. Harry and Emma managed to catch a local bus, whilst Melanie and Helene spent 20 euros on a taxi. Eventually Alex and Noel also managed to secure a ride. At the cathedral further instructions told the teams to take the Fjellheisen cable car to the finish line at the upper station's observation deck overlooking Tromsoya island. Alex and Noel managed to make it there first at 6.09pm on day 28 with Harry and Emma arriving four minutes later at 06:13pm. Melanie and Helene arrived at 07:09pm, 1 hour behind.

Order	Teams	Route	Hours behind leaders	Money left
1	Alex & Noel	Berlin → Stockholm → Jukkasjärvi → Narvik → Tromsø	—N/a	300 euros (7%)
2	Harry & Emma	Berlin → Hamburg → Oslo → Fauske → Narvik → Tromsø	4 minutes	11 euros (0.30%)
3	Melanie & Helene	Berlin → Tallinn → Helsinki → Oulu → Rovaniemi → Tromsø	1 hour	1 euro (0.05%)

== Critical reception ==
Opinions on the first episode of the celebrity series were favourable overall despite many reviewers' reservations about celebrities and reality TV shows. Anita Singh of The Telegraph awarded the opening episode 4 stars out of 5, stating "The stakes are lower when celebrities are involved, rather than members of the public, but it is still an enjoyable show because the format is so strong."

Emily Baker of the I also awarded it 4 stars out of 5, commenting "It's almost irrelevant that the racers this time around are famous; this version of Race Across the World is just as compulsive and wonderful as the one about normos like us." Another 4 star review came from Adam Miller of the Metro whose "fears Celebrity Race Across The World wouldn't have as much depth and heart as its 'civilian' counterpart were totally misguided."

Carol Midgley, writing in The Times, gave the opening episode 3 stars out of 5, as did Lucy Mangan of The Guardian, who opined: "It is the family dynamics that make the show."

== Ratings ==
Episode no.	Airdate	Total viewers (millions)	Weekly ranking all channels
1	20 September 2023	4.73	3
2	27 September 2023	4.37	8
3	4 October 2023	4.59	7
4	11 October 2023	4.39	16
5	18 October 2023	4.35	16
6	25 October 2023	4.48	9
