= Celebrity Race Across the World =

British television series

- Genre: Reality competition Travel
- Directed by: Alex Mucadum
- Narrated by: John Hannah
- Theme music composer: Michael Burns
- Country of origin: United Kingdom
- Original language: English
- No. of series: 4
- No. of episodes: 24

Production
- Executive producers: Rob Fisher; Tim Harcourt; Emma Peach; Charlotte Woolley
- Producers: Carolina Izquierdo; Philip McCreery; Delia Williams
- Running time: 60 minutes
- Production company: Studio Lambert

Original release
- Network: BBC One
- Release: 20 September 2023 – present

Related
- Race Across the World

Celebrity Race Across the World is a spin-off series of Race Across the World, where pairs of competitors race across an area of the world to reach a destination using any means of transportation other than by air. It uses a similar format to Race Across the World with some adjustments.

The celebrity spin-off series was first announced in 2019, but production was subsequently delayed due to the COVID-19 pandemic. The first series eventually aired on 20 September 2023 on BBC One Further series were commissioned and three series have been produced by 2025.

== Format ==
The programme follows four pairs of celebrities who race to their final destination. The route is punctuated by a series of checkpoints, and the participants travel from checkpoint to checkpoint until they reach their final destination. Each episode focuses on one checkpoint; since the route is generally shorter than that of the regular version, there are consequently fewer checkpoints and episodes. For their travel expenses, each pair are given an amount of money equivalent to the price of a one-way plane ticket to the final destination. The teams can earn extra money by working along the route. The teams can only travel by land or sea, although flights may be arranged for the competitors under special circumstances.

At the start of the race, each team is given an essential race kit including a GPS tracker, a map, and their budget money in cash, but their own mobile phones and bank cards are removed. The teams are given a checkpoint they have to reach in every episode, and a travel guide with jobs they can do along the way. Each team is always accompanied by at least one member of the production crew. The first team to arrive has the first choice on the work they can do in next leg, and other teams cannot choose the same job or excursion. The teams may be given extra instructions en route to their destination. Unlike the regular series, there is no elimination at any of the checkpoints, and the winning team receive no prize money.

== Series overview ==
Series	Episodes	Originally released			Start	End	Winners
Series	Episodes	First released	Last released	Network	Start	End	Winners
1	6	20 September 2023	25 October 2023	BBC One	Marrakesh, Morocco	Tromsø, Norway	Alex Beresford & Noel Beresford
2	6	14 August 2024	18 September 2024	BBC One	Belém, Brazil	Frutillar, Chile	Scott Mills & Sam Vaughan
3	6	6 November 2025	11 December 2025	BBC One	Isla Mujeres, Mexico	Península de La Guajira, Colombia	Roman Kemp & Harleymoon Kemp
4	6	28 October 2026	2 December 2026	BBC One	Kuching, Malaysia	Melbourne, Australia	TBA

=== Series 1 (2023) ===
Celebrity Series 1 start and end points

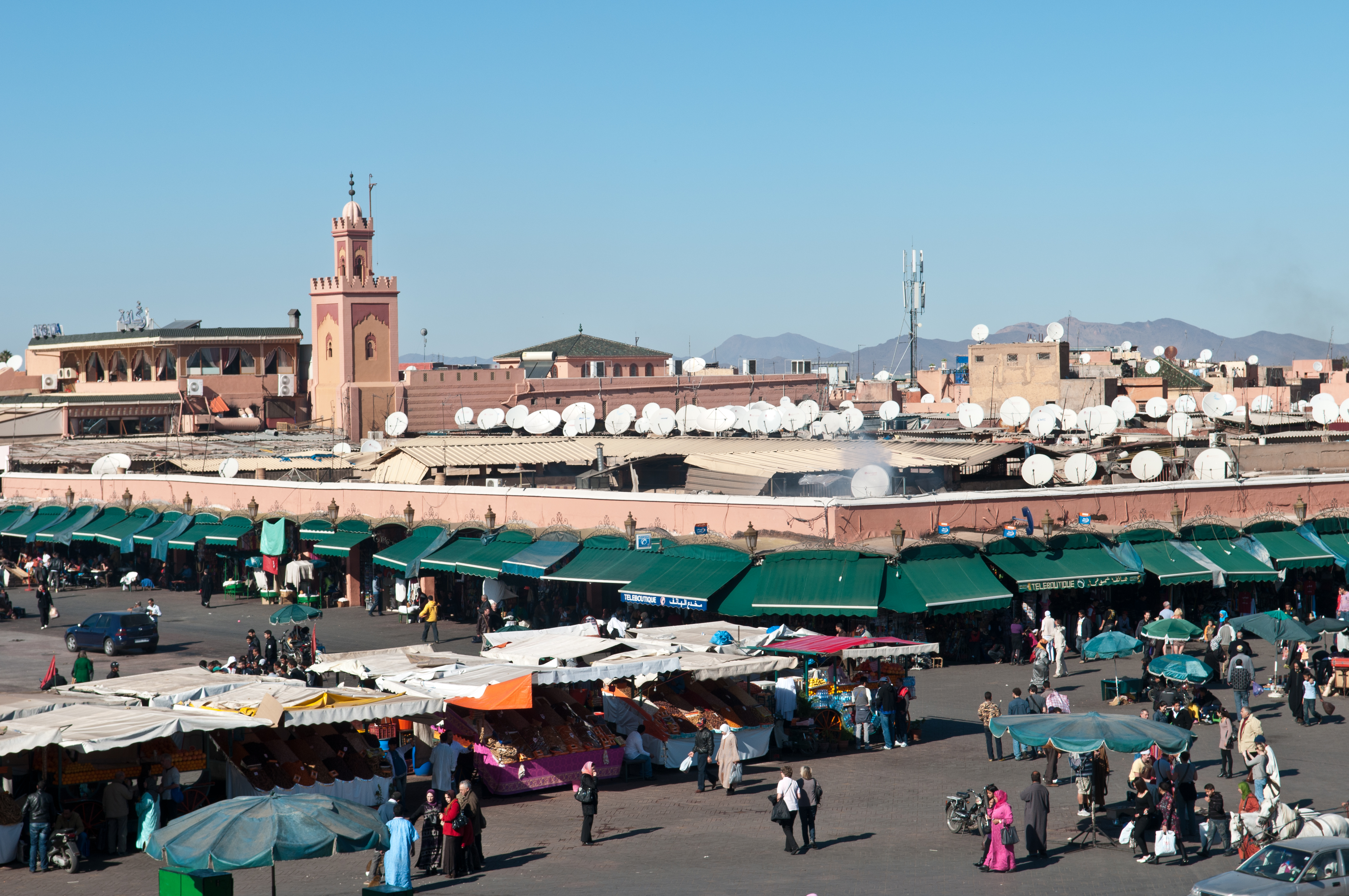
Marrakesh (Morocco)

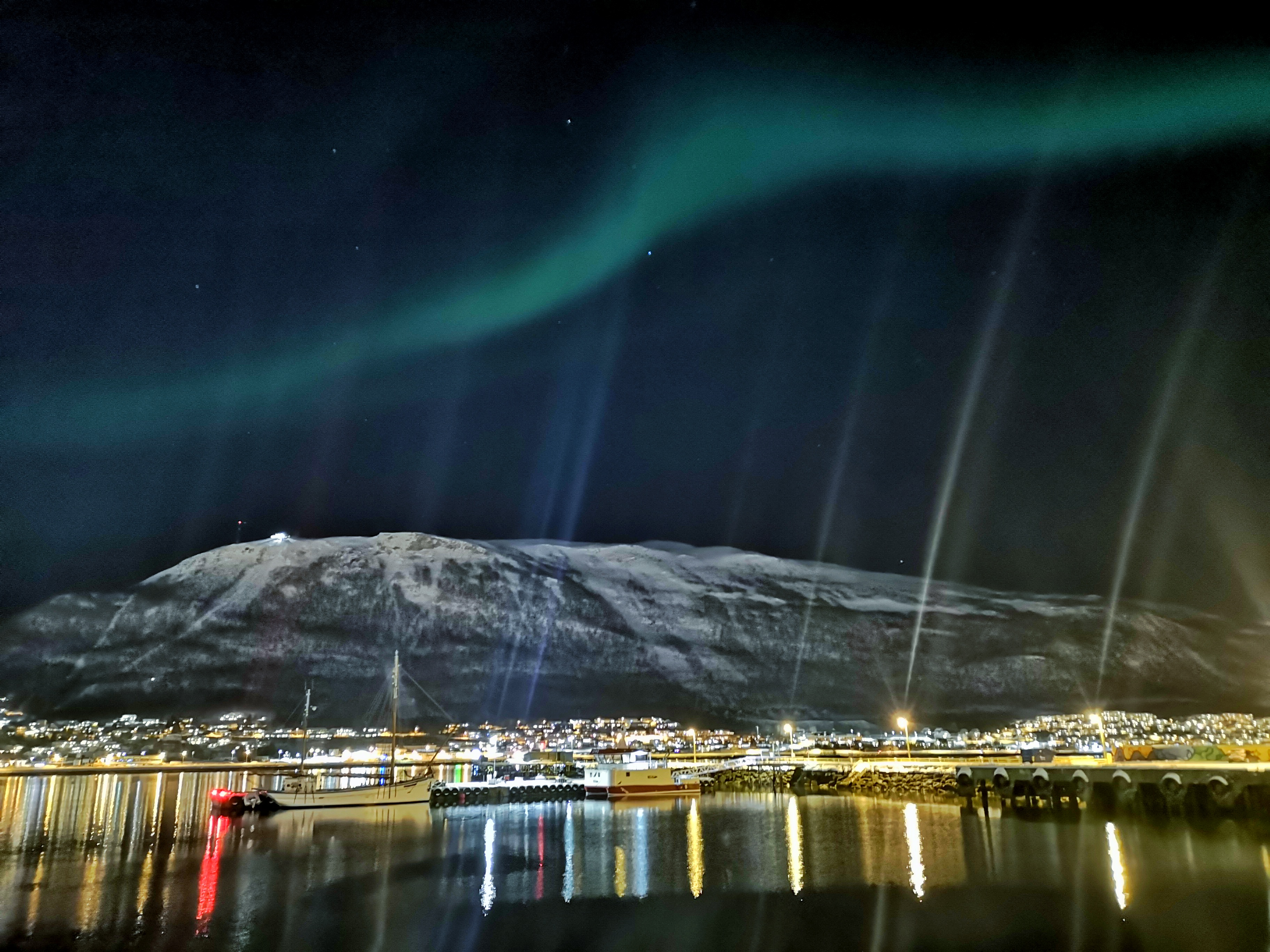
Tromsø (Norway)

In an announcement on 3 October 2019, it was revealed that a celebrity spin-off series was in the works, but production was subsequently delayed due to the COVID-19 pandemic. The production was delayed due to the Covid pandemic; On 27 July 2023, the BBC announced that the delayed celebrity edition of Race Across the World would air later that same year and revealed a route spanning 24 countries and over 10,000 kilometres (6,200 mi) starting in Marrakesh, Morocco and finishing in Tromsø, Norway.

In the same press release the BBC announced that the first celebrity series would consist of six episodes and revealed the four pairs of competitors as weather presenter Alex Beresford and his father, Noel; former All Saints singer Melanie Blatt and her mother, Helene; McFly drummer Harry Judd and his mother, Emma and former British F4 Racing Driver Billy Monger and his sister, Bonny. It aired on 20 September 2023 after a week delay due to an earthquake in Morocco where the first episode was filmed. The series was won by Alex Beresford and his dad Noel Beresford.

=== Series 2 (2024) ===
Celebrity Series 2 start and end points

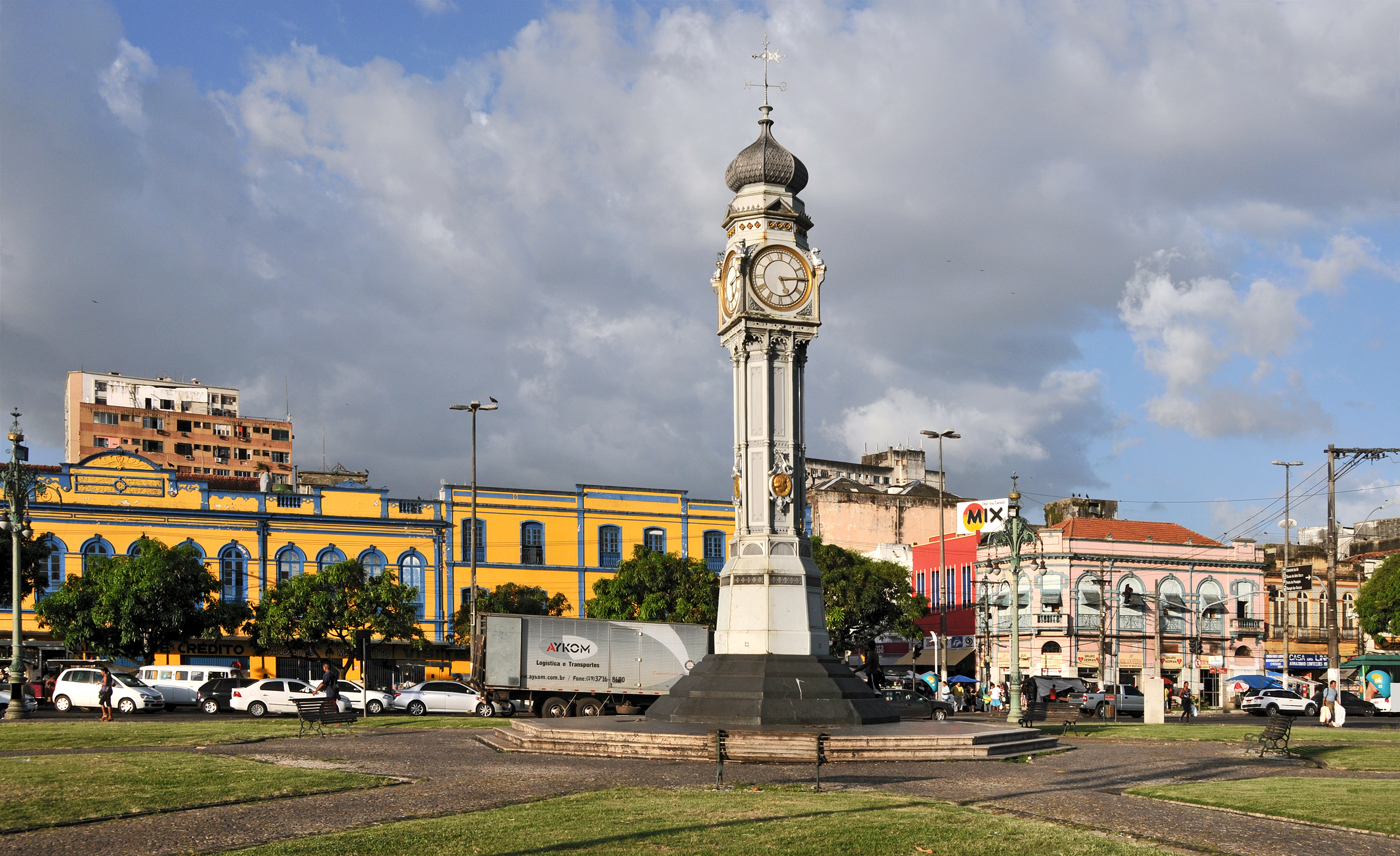
Belem (Brazil)

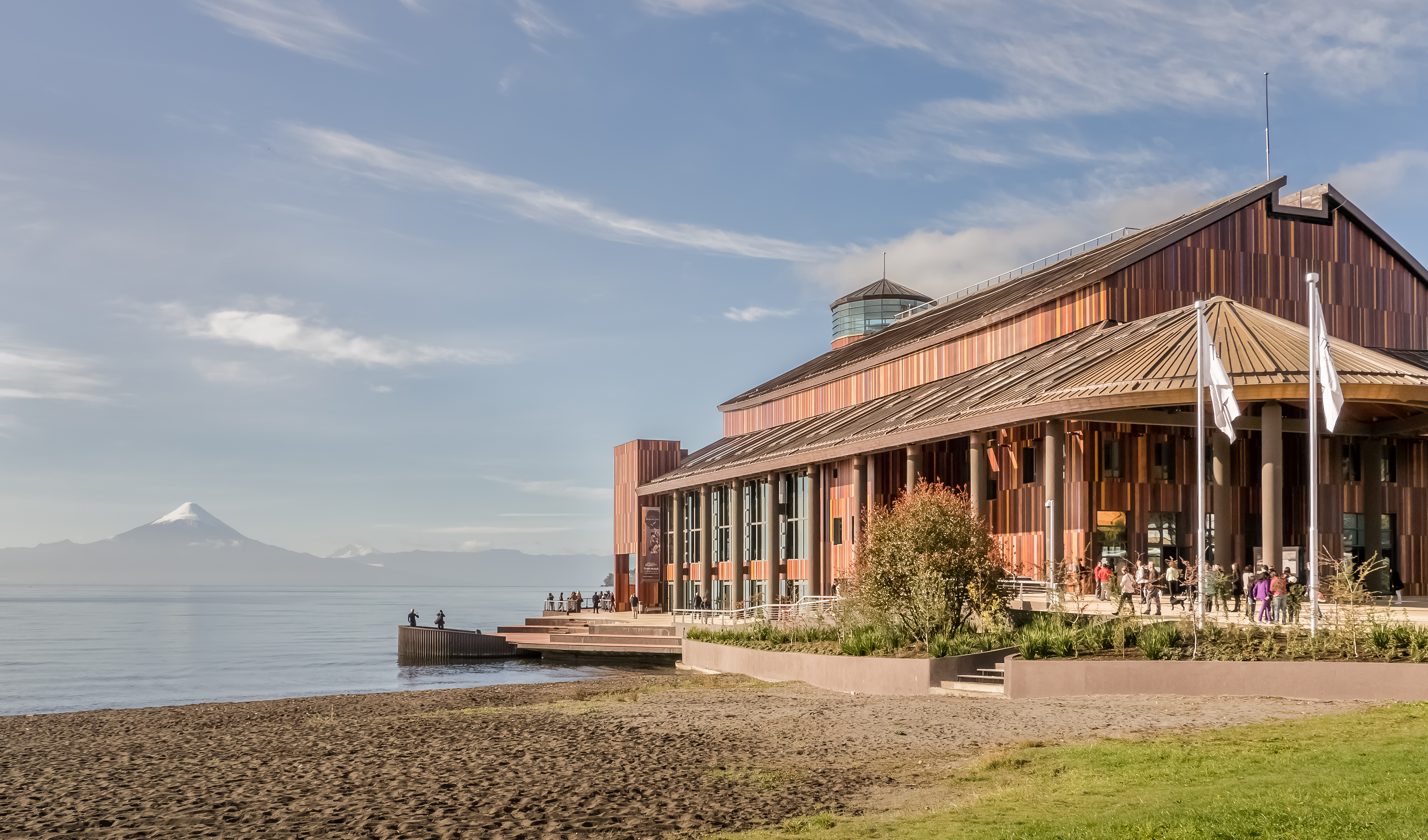
Frutillar (Chile)

It was announced by the BBC on 30 July 2024 with a transmission date of 14 August 2024. The race started in Belem, Brazil and finished in Frutillar, Chile, covering a distance of over 12,500 kilometres (7,800 mi).

In the same press release the BBC confirmed that the series would once again consist of six hour-long episodes and revealed the four pairs of competitors as broadcaster Jeff Brazier and his son, Freddy; actor Kola Bokinni and his cousin, Mary Ellen; former model Kelly Brook and her husband, Jeremy and BBC Radio 2 presenter Scott Mills and his husband Sam and they won the race beating Kola and Mary Ellen.

=== Series 3 (2025) ===
Celebrity Series 3 start and end points

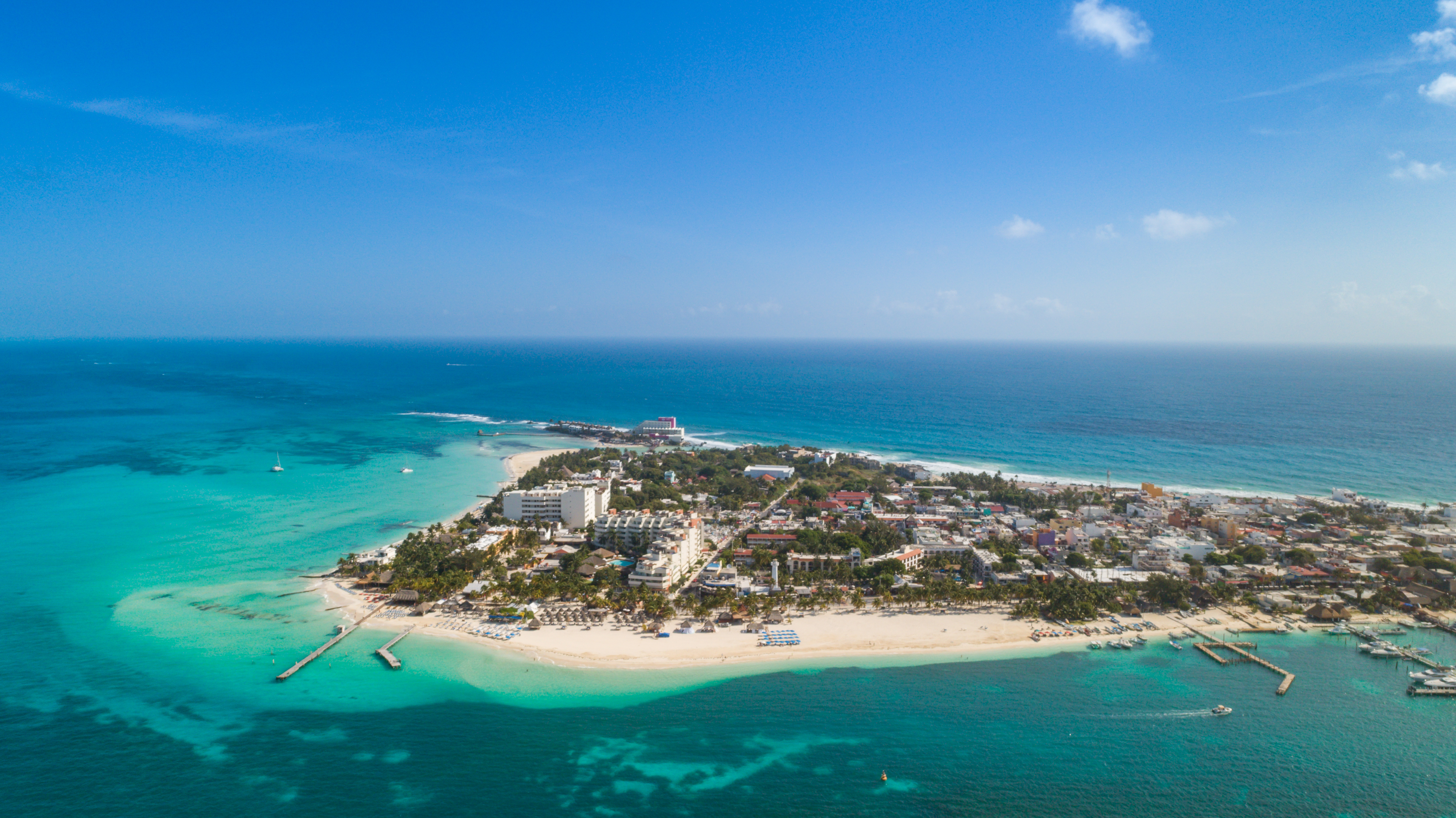
Isla Mujeres (Mexico)

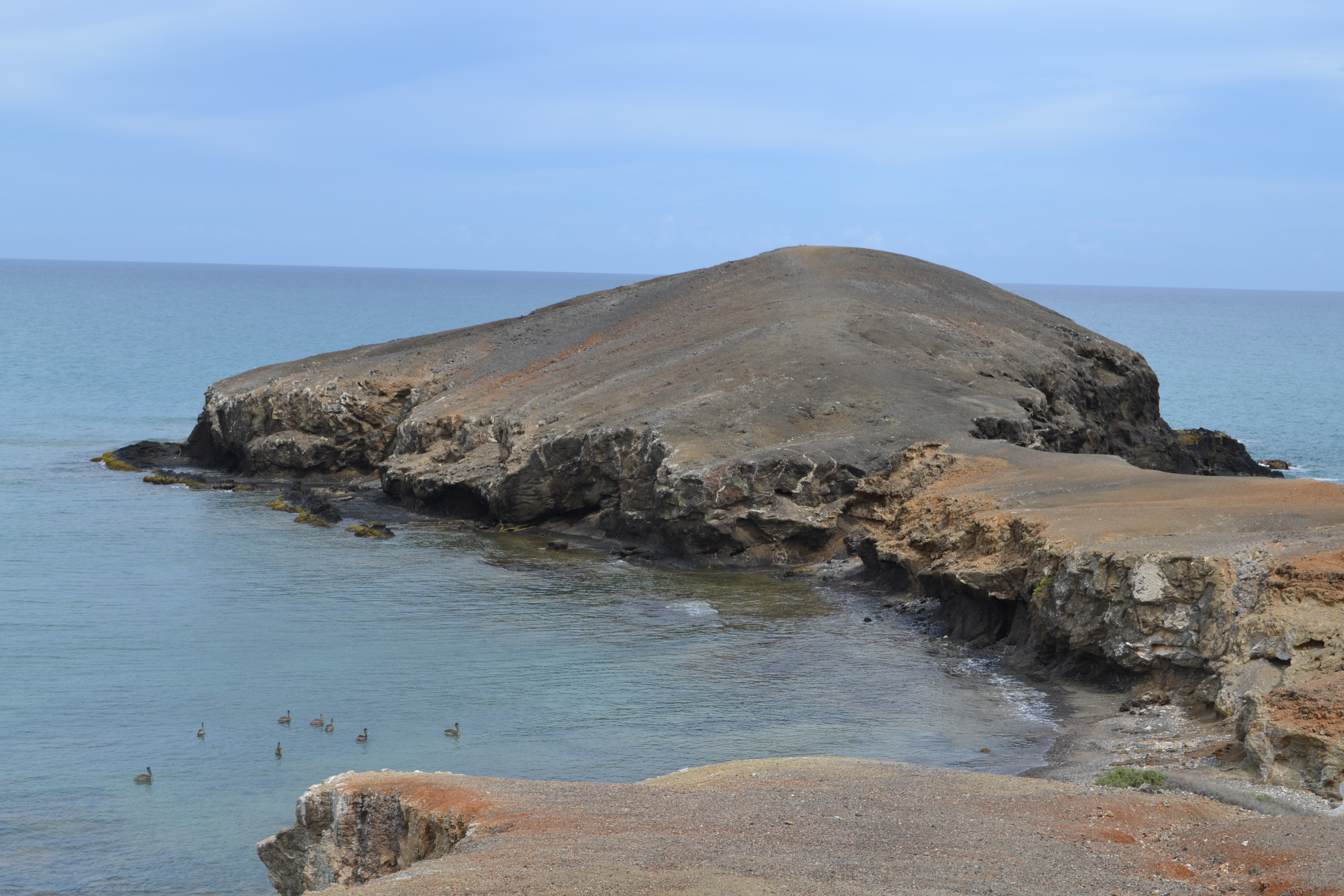
Headland near Cabo de la Vela (Colombia)

The racers were announced on 18 September 2025: broadcaster and writer Anita Rani and her dad, Bal; actor Dylan Llewellyn and his mum, Jackie; partners, presenter and DJ Tyler West and actor and singer, Molly Rainford and broadcaster Roman Kemp and his sister, singer-songwriter, Harleymoon.

The race started from Isla Mujeres in Mexico and finishing on a headland in the Peninsula de la Guajira in Colombia, a distance of 5,900 km. Part of the route was affected by road closures which affected some teams. The race was won by Roman and Harleymoon who beat Molly and Tyler in the final road, boat and on-foot race.

=== Series 4 (2026) ===
Celebrity Series 4 start and end points

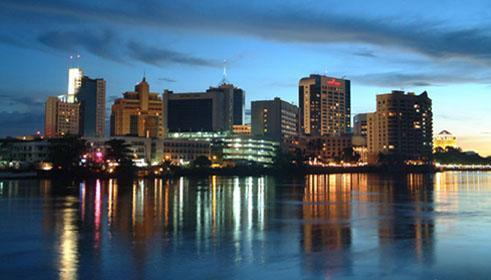
Kuching (Malaysia)

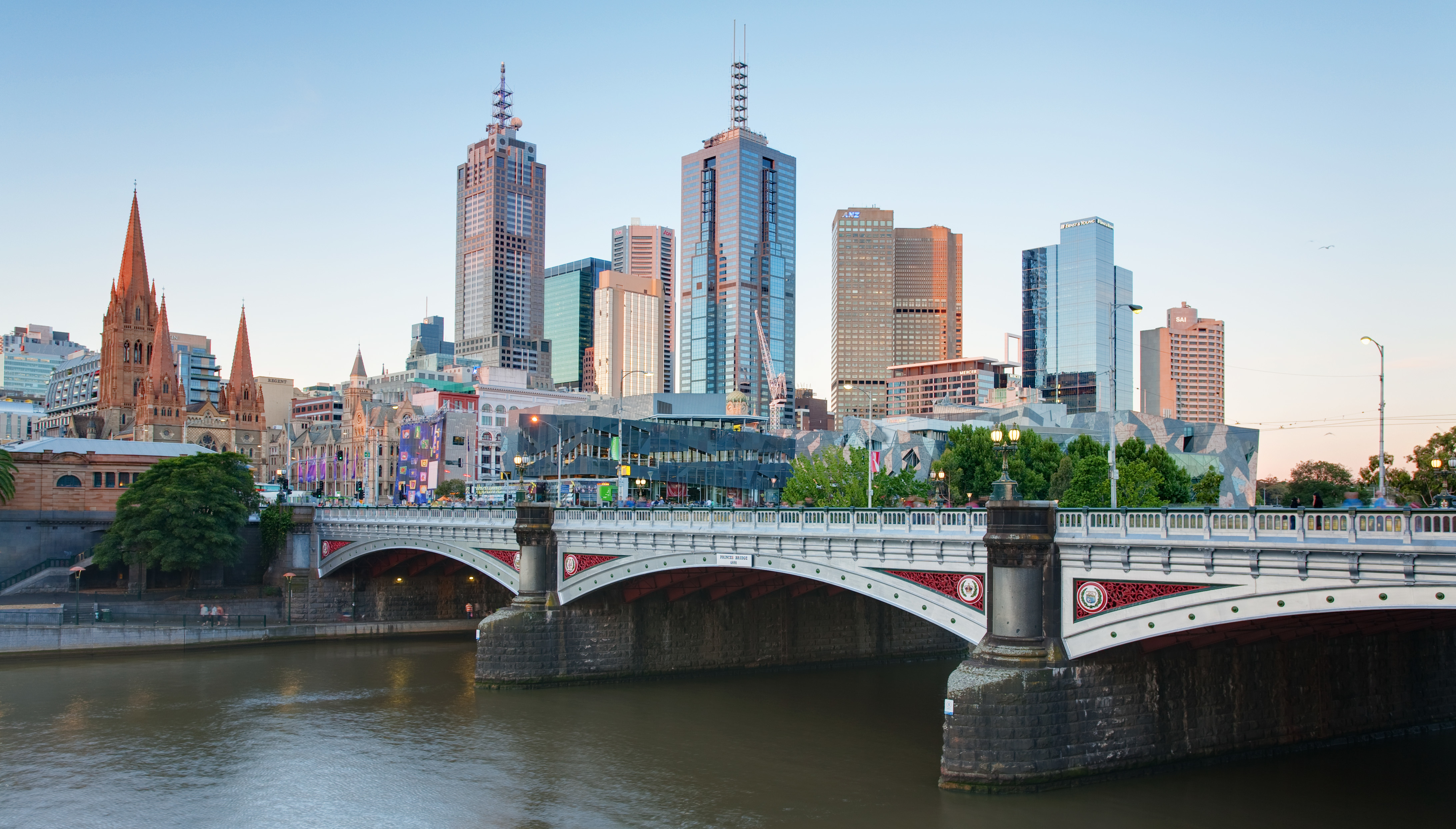
Melbourne (Australia)

The racers were announced on 1 October 2026: Ella Eyre and childhood friend Nana; Jeff Stelling and his son Matt; Princess Andre with her brother, Junior Andre; Sam Ryder with his best friend and tour manager, Kaz.

The race started in Kuching, Malaysia and will end in Melbourne in Australia, a distance of 7,500 km.
