= Tromsdalstinden =

Mountain in Troms, Norway

Tromsdalstinden (Norwegian); Sálašoaivi (Northern Sami)
- Sálaščohkka (Northern Sami)
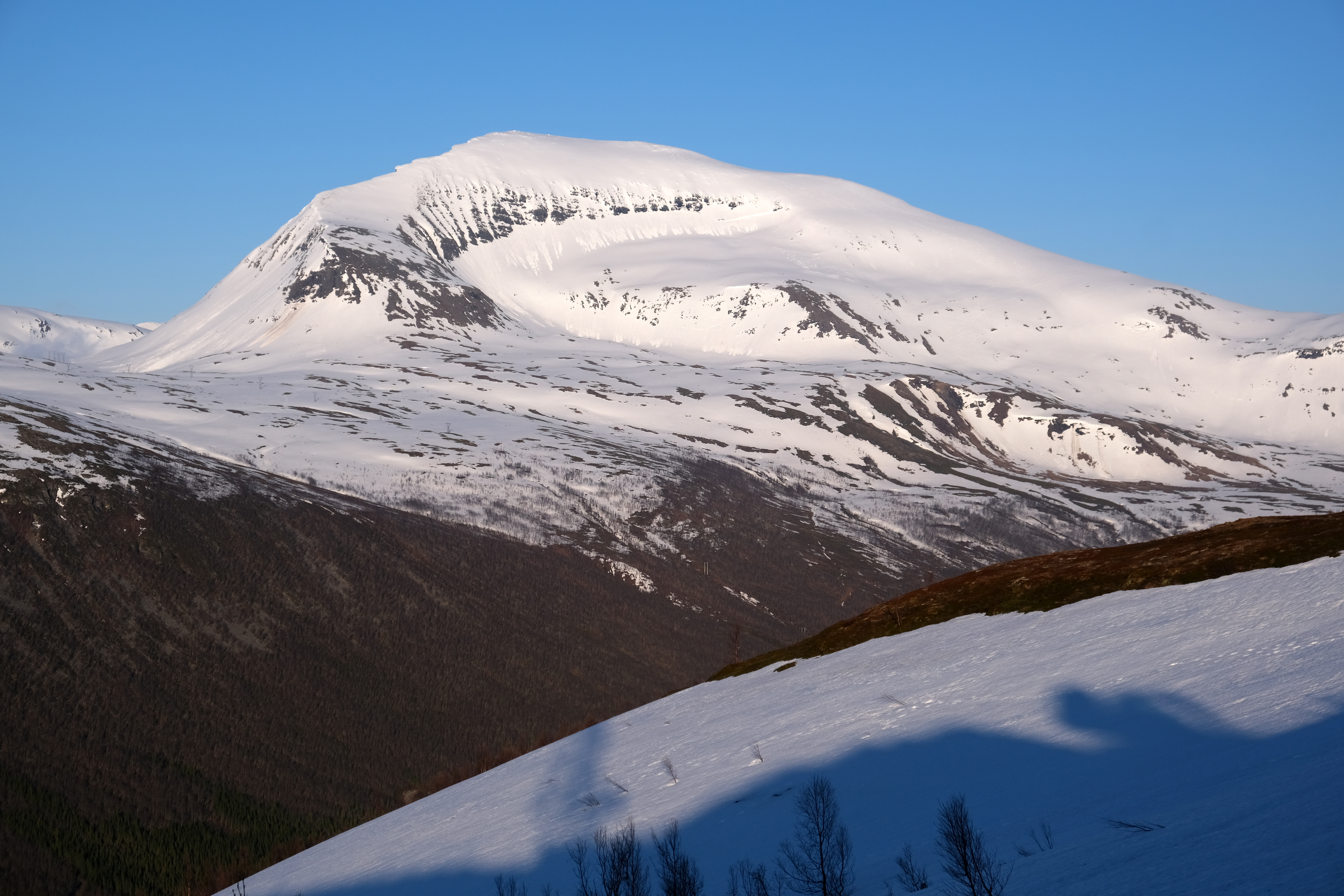
- Tromsdalstinden as seen from Fløya

Highest point
- Elevation: 1,238 m (4,062 ft)
- Prominence: 1,170 m (3,840 ft)
- Isolation: 9.58 km (5.95 mi)
- Coordinates: 69.6072°N 19.1458°E

Geography
- Interactive map of the mountain
- Location: Troms, Norway
- Topo map: 1534 III Tromsø

Climbing
- Easiest route: Hike

Tromsdalstinden (Norwegian) or Sálašoaivi or Sálaščohkka (Northern Sami) is a mountain in Tromsø Municipality in Troms county, Norway. The 1,238-metre (4,062 ft) tall mountain is located at the southern end of the Tromsdalen valley, just southeast of Tromsø. Snowfall varies from yearly, but the peak is usually snow free only for a few months in the summer. The mountain is easily spotted from the city centre of Tromsø. The summit is a popular hike, requiring nothing more than good shoes, average physical condition, and plenty to drink.

== Etymology ==
The Norwegian name Tromsdalstinden means "the peak above Tromsdalen," while the Sami (or Sámi) name comprises Sálaš and Oaivi. The first word signifies a good hunting area; the second translates as "head," but when speaking of landscapes indicates a mountain that is rounded, i.e., does not have any jagged peaks.

== Skiing and hiking ==
Hikers may summit Tromsdalstinden either from the suburb of Tromsdalen or Ramfjorden. The slopes up are relatively straightforward, though fog and rain can complicate the ascent for those unfamiliar with the terrain. When approaching the mountain from the southeast (Ramfjorden), though, hikers and skiers must at one point move over the southwestern or northwestern (city-facing) sides of the mountain as the mountain becomes too steep. The best season for hiking is May through September. Skiers usually take the Fjellheisen aerial tramway to Storsteinen and begin their ascent there. There are two main treks, the Winter and Summer treks.

=== The Winter trek ===
A ski trip that starts on the southwest side of the mountain (on the right in the pictures) is called Salen (the Saddle). When descending, skiers zig-zag down from the top until they reach the little lake Tromsdalsvannet (nor.) or Moskojávri (sám.) in the innermost part of the Tromsdalen valley.

=== The Summer trek ===
A hike that starts on the zig-zag trek used to descend when skiing. On the way back, hikers follow the narrow northeastern ridge of the mountain (left on the pictures). The descent route at one point takes you quite close to the steep drop behind the hill which may not be suitable for hikers prone to vertigo. For such hikers, returning the way they came is a better recommendation.

=== Straight up ===
Also, ascending from the northwest, i.e., straight up from the valley, is possible. Hikers then start at the Nerloftet (a low plateau above the Tromsdalen valley), proceed to the halfway stop, Loftet (a protruding part of the mountain facing the city), and then go straight up. When the mountain becomes too steep to keep going straight, you go upwards to the right until you're on the 'winter route' (the right slope). The names of these points mean, respectively, the Lower Attic and the Attic. This route is quite steep and thus demanding but safe - although some rocks may be slippery or loose, one should be careful.

== Controversy over Sámi cultural significance ==
In 2003 Tromsø applied to host the 2014 Winter Olympics. The proposal to the International Olympic Committee featured plans to build an alpine skiing facility on the mountain's slopes. This sparked immediate protests from some Sami activists who claimed that Tromsdaltinden had been a Sami sacred mountain since ancient times. A heated debate ensued over whether Tromsdalstinden could be considered "holy" or not.

The Sami Parliament enacted a resolution declaring it a holy mountain in 2004, and the plans were discontinued. The Sámi Parliament has no formal authority to declare objects 'sacred.' Despite this, their resolution was listened to. Lawyers in the aftermath discussed the possibility of defining a mountain as a cultural relic according to the definition of "cultural relic" in the law.

Professor Siv Ellen Kraft from the Department of Religious Studies, University of Tromsø wrote an article suggesting that Tromsdalstind was made a holy mountain in recent times as a part of Sami identity politics. However, the mountain is also reckoned by Sámi people in the region to have been sacred at one point, before Christianization. The mountain bears the significant feature of a traditional sacred mountain. I.e., it dominates the landscape due to shape or height. The conventional Sámi religion is dead, and only elements survive through local vestiges and neo-shamanism; a good case can be made that the mountain is no longer sacred to most Sámi in the traditional sense. Still, the level of commitment to the mountain shown by the Sámi - up to the point of having the Sámi parliament pronounce it sacred - quite effectively displays the intense cultural significance of the mountain to modern Sámi also, a value which is indeed rooted in the religious traditions of one's ancestors.

== Media gallery ==
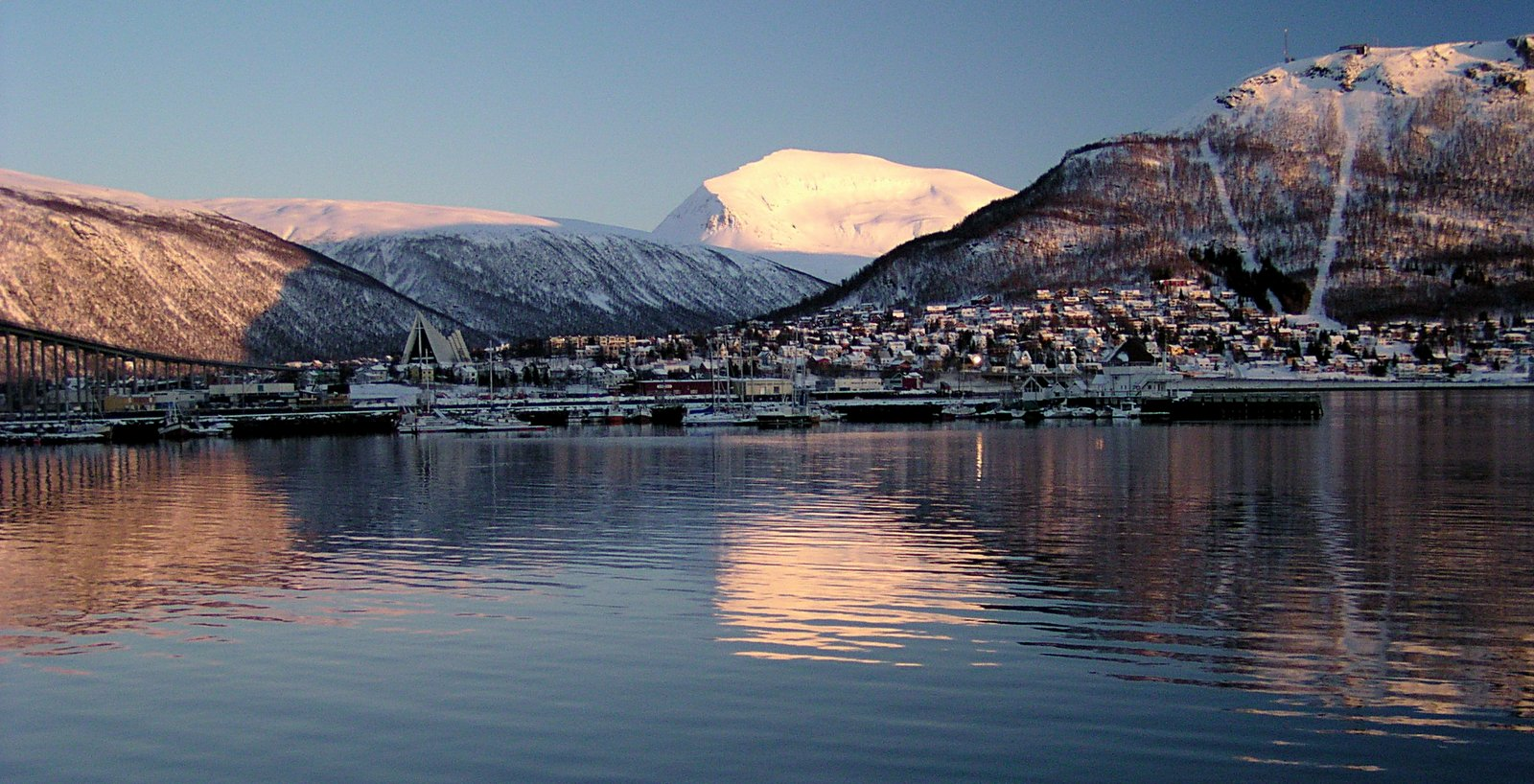
Tromsdalstinden is easily visible above Tromsdalen

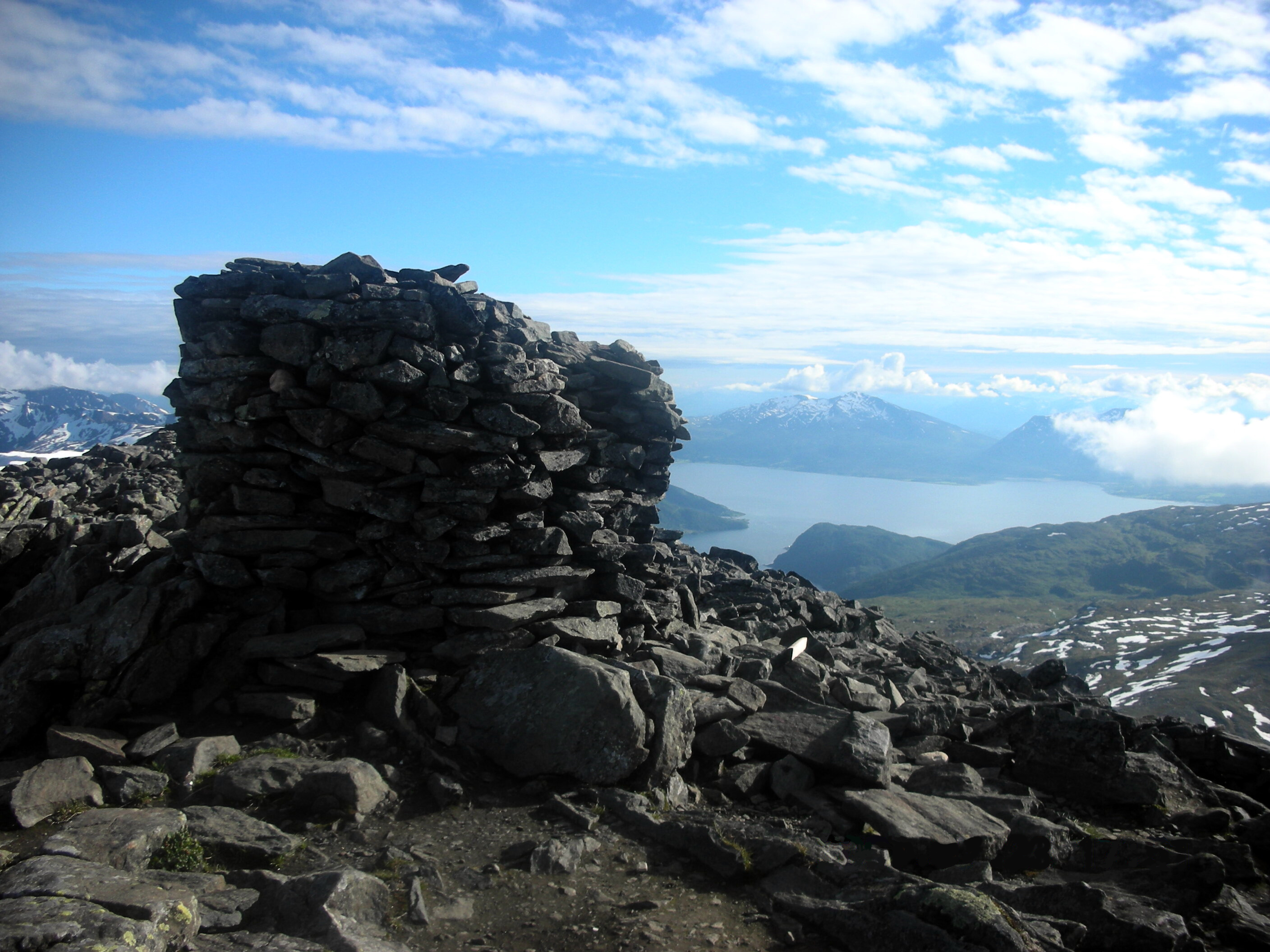
The beacon on the summit

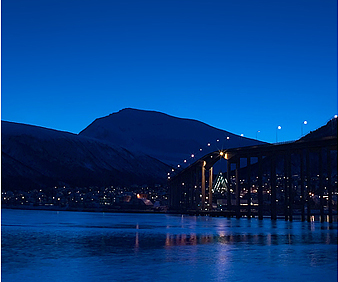
View of the mountain

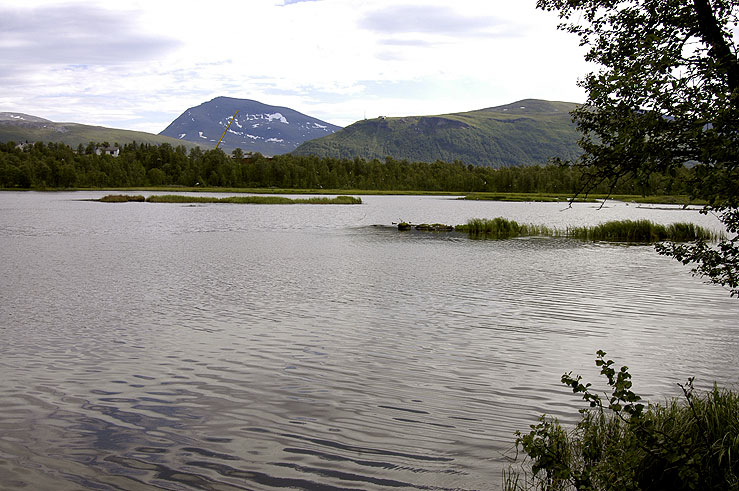
View from Prestvannet in the city of Tromsø

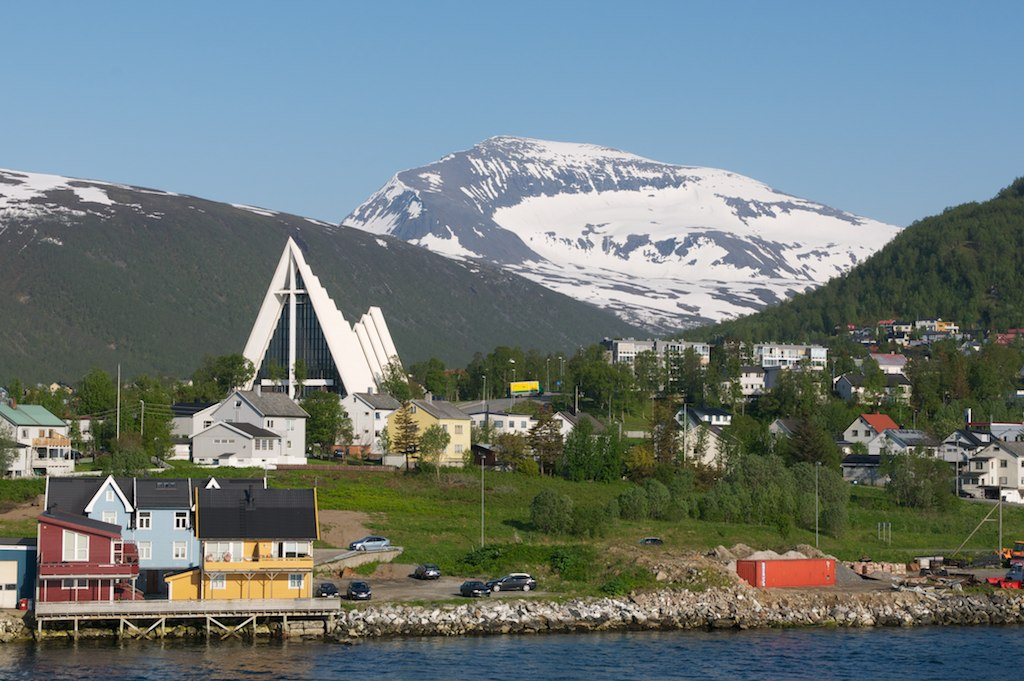
View of the Arctic Cathedral with Tromsdalstinden in the background

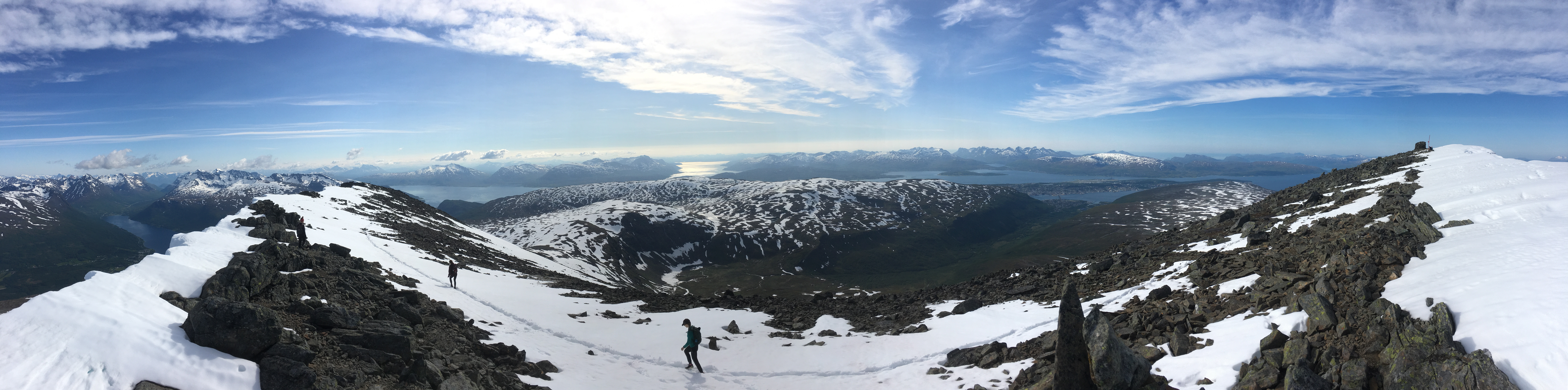
Panoramic view from Tromsdalstinden
