= Fjellheisen =

Aerial tramway in Tromso, Norway

Coordinates: 69°38′27″N 18°59′14″E

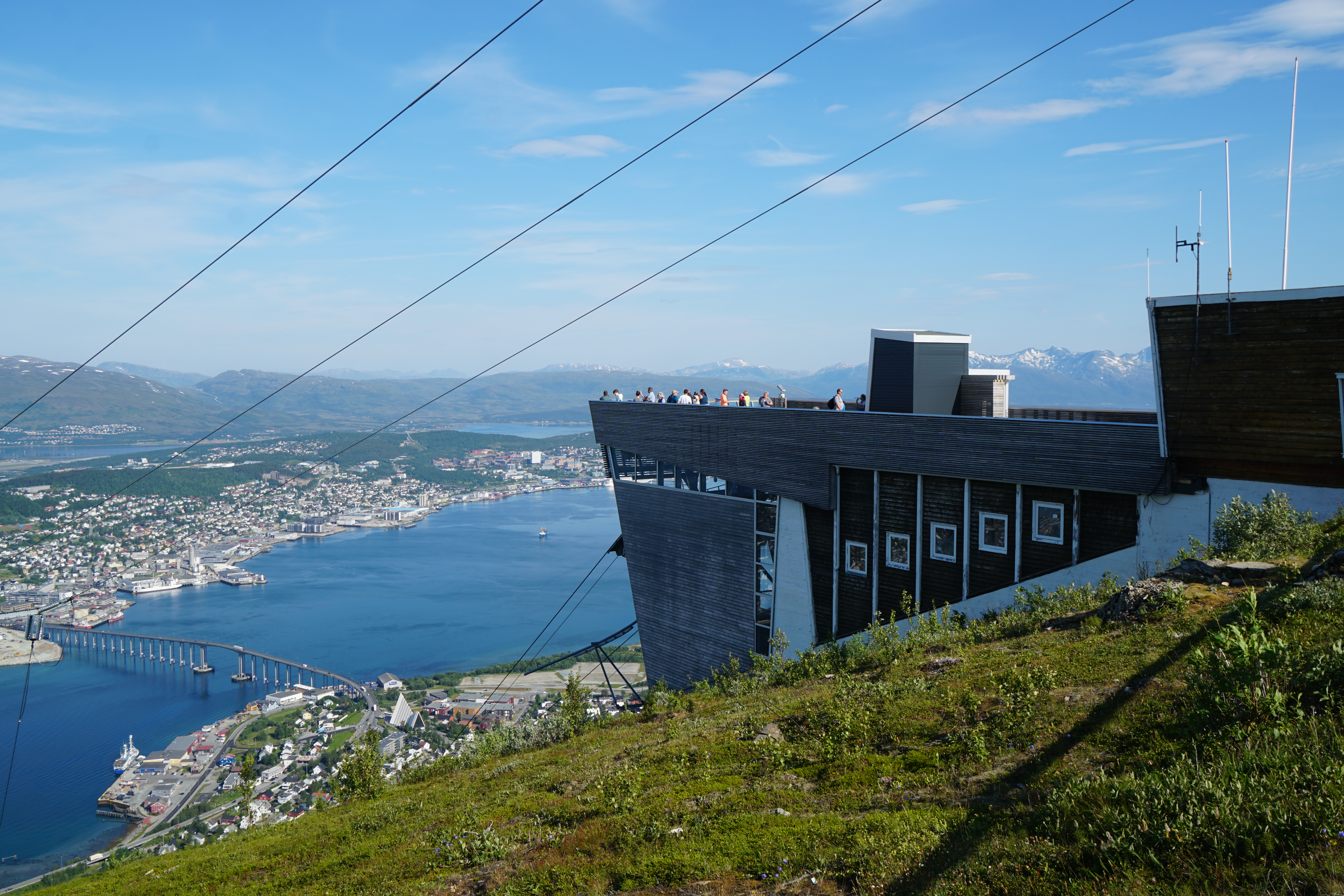
Fjellheisen

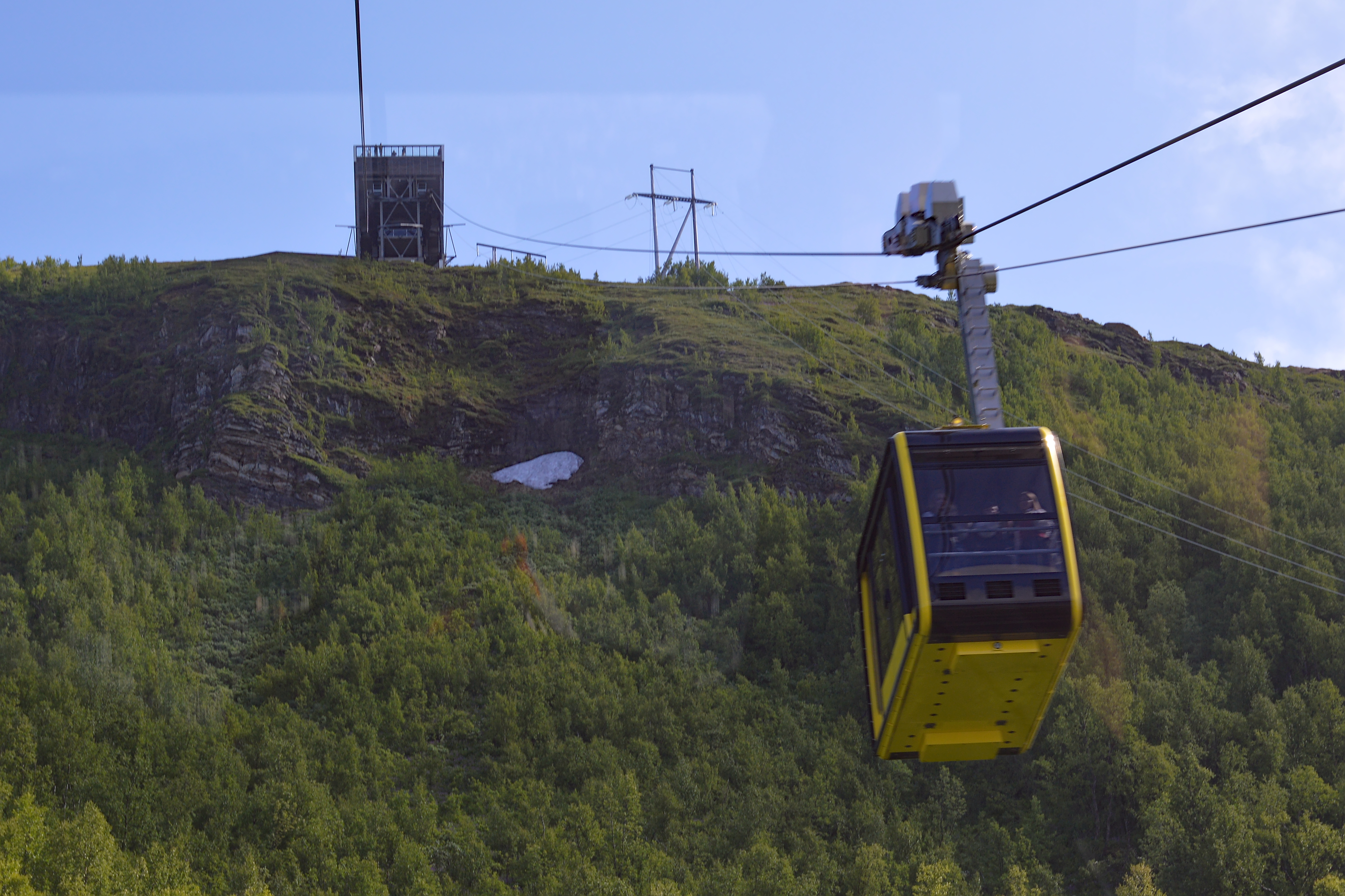
View of the cable car in 2023

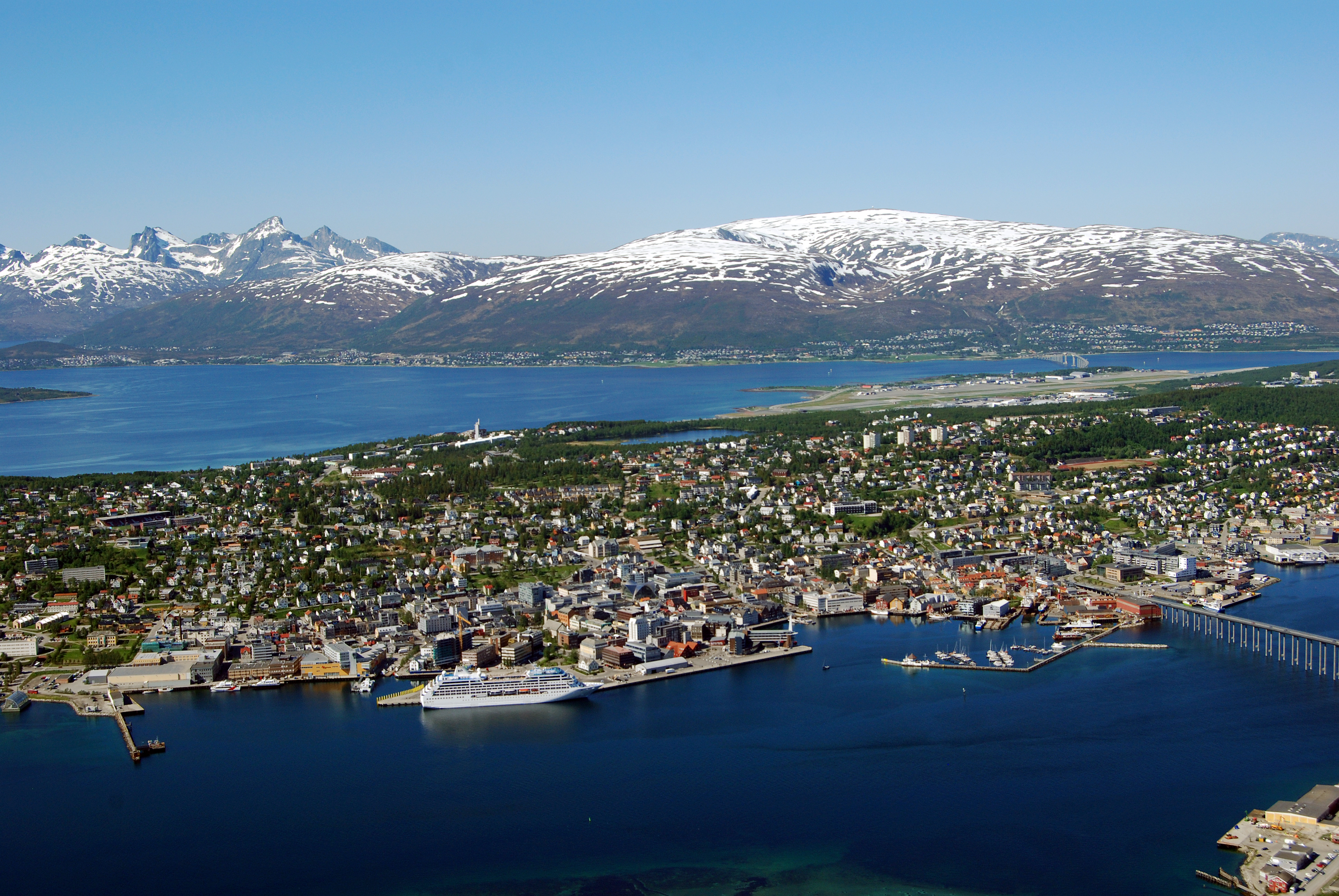
View of Tromsø from Mount Storsteinen

Fjellheisen (English: Tromsø Cable Car) is an aerial tramway in Tromsø, Norway.

The lower station is located near sea level in Tromsdalen, a suburb on the mainland. The upper station is situated at Storsteinen (English: The big rock), a mountain ledge about 420 metres (1,380 ft) above sea level. The four-minute trip to the upper station is a popular destination, offering visitors a commanding view of the city and the surrounding islands and fjords from an outdoor viewing deck. Food and drinks are served in Fjellstua restaurant. Many passengers use the tramway as a launching point for hikes to various mountains in the area, including Tromsdalstinden. This iconic 1,238 metres (4,062 ft) high peak is easily visible from the city.

The tramway is particularly busy in the summer when it is popular with cruise-ship passengers wishing to get a good view of the midnight sun. In winter, the cable car operates from 10 am to 10 pm if weather conditions are relatively comfortable. It is an excellent vantage point for viewing the Northern Lights.

Fjellheisen is owned by Skips AS Nordfisk and operated by Utelivsbyen AS.

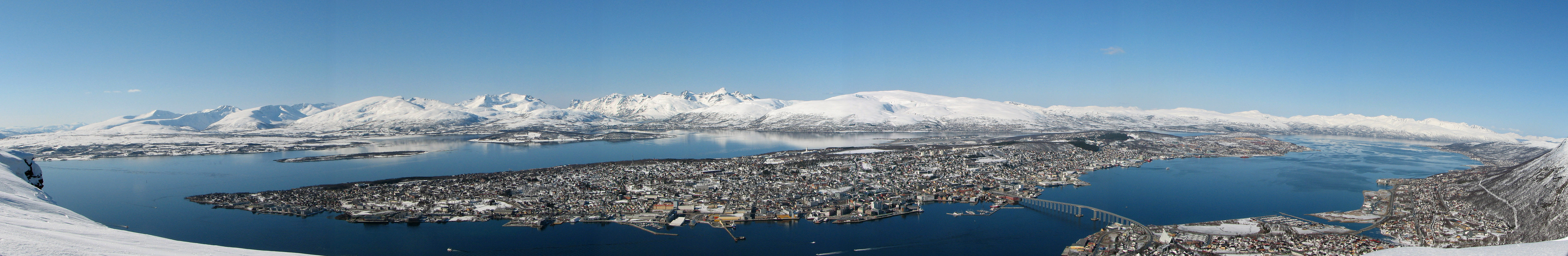
Panoramic view of Tromsø from Fjellheisen.

== History ==
Construction of Fjellheisen was started in 1960. The builder was Brødrene Jakobsens Rederi, a shipping company. The tramway officially opened on February 22, 1961.
