= 2026 Norwegian Second Division (women) =

Norwegian football season

Norwegian Second Division
- Season: 2026
- Dates: 11 April – 25 October
- Champions: Sarpsborg 08 (Group 1); HamKam (Group 2)
- Promoted: Sarpsborg 08; HamKam
- Relegated: Malvik; KFUM; Vålerenga 2 Krokelvdalen
- Matches: 264
- Goals: 1,050 (3.98 per match)

The 2026 Norwegian Second Division was a third-tier Norwegian women's football league season. The league consisted of 24 teams divided into two groups of 12 teams. The season started on 11 April 2026 and ended on 25 October 2026, not including play-off matches.

== Group 1 ==
=== League table ===
Pos	Team	Pld	W	D	L	GF	GA	GD	Pts	Promotion, qualification or relegation
1	Sarpsborg 08 (C, P)	22	20	1	1	89	15	+74	61	Promotion to First Division
2	KIL/Hemne	22	11	4	7	47	31	+16	37	Qualification for the promotion play-offs
3	Sogndal	22	11	3	8	50	48	+2	36	
4	Brann 2	22	10	4	8	47	47	0	34	
5	Rosenborg 2	22	10	3	9	54	52	+2	33	
6	Sandefjord	22	9	4	9	49	50	−1	31	
7	Tiller	22	9	3	10	49	43	+6	30	
8	Aalesund 2	22	8	3	11	46	57	−11	27	
9	Fana	22	7	5	10	30	49	−19	26	
10	Amazon Grimstad	22	8	1	13	29	46	−17	25	
11	Malvik (R)	22	6	5	11	44	58	−14	23	Relegation to Third Division
12	KFUM (R)	22	3	4	15	27	65	−38	13	Relegation to Third Division

Source: Norwegian Football Federation (in Norwegian)
Rules for classification: 1) Points; 2) Goal difference; 3) Goals scored; 4) Head-to-head points; 5) Head-to-head goal difference; 6) Head-to-head goals scored.
(C) Champions; (P) Promoted; (R) Relegated

=== Results ===
Home \ Away	AAL	AMA	BRA	FAN	KFU	KIL	MAL	ROS	SAN	SAR	SOG	TIL
Aalesund 2	—	4–0	2–0	3–1	2–1	3–2	0–2	3–2	0–1	1–3	1–5	4–3
Amazon Grimstad	2–1	—	3–2	1–2	3–0	0–4	1–2	2–3	2–1	0–1	0–5	0–1
Brann 2	0–3	3–0	—	1–1	1–2	3–2	5–4	2–2	2–1	0–3	2–3	2–2
Fana	2–0	1–2	1–2	—	1–1	1–0	2–2	4–2	1–0	0–6	1–4	2–1
KFUM	4–4	0–3	0–4	3–2	—	0–0	1–2	0–3	2–3	1–4	1–2	1–5
KIL/Hemne	4–0	2–0	1–1	5–2	6–0	—	0–0	3–1	5–0	1–1	2–0	2–0
Malvik	7–7	3–3	3–4	0–1	1–3	3–0	—	3–4	2–3	1–5	0–2	0–2
Rosenborg 2	3–2	2–3	2–4	1–1	4–3	3–0	5–0	—	1–1	1–4	3–0	0–5
Sandefjord	3–3	3–0	1–5	4–1	2–2	8–1	0–2	2–5	—	1–5	4–4	7–1
Sarpsborg 08	3–0	1–2	5–0	8–1	8–1	3–2	5–0	3–0	5–0	—	7–1	4–1
Sogndal	3–2	2–0	0–3	2–1	3–0	1–2	5–5	3–6	0–2	0–3	—	2–0
Tiller	6–1	3–2	6–1	1–1	2–1	1–3	0–2	4–1	1–2	1–2	3–3	—

Source: Norwegian Football Federation (in Norwegian)
Legend: Blue = home team win; Yellow = draw; Red = away team win.

== Group 2 ==
=== League table ===
Pos	Team	Pld	W	D	L	GF	GA	GD	Pts	Promotion, qualification or relegation
1	HamKam (C, P)	22	16	3	3	57	21	+36	51	Promotion to First Division
2	Øvrevoll Hosle	22	15	5	2	44	17	+27	50	Qualification for the promotion play-offs
3	Raufoss	22	13	4	5	64	30	+34	43	
4	Stabæk 2	22	12	3	7	41	22	+19	39	
5	Strømsgodset	22	10	4	8	57	32	+25	34	
6	Tynset	22	8	8	6	43	35	+8	32	
7	Røa 2	22	10	1	11	43	47	−4	31	
8	Medkila	22	7	5	10	36	40	−4	26	
9	Lillestrøm	22	6	3	13	32	57	−25	21	
10	Lyn 2	22	6	3	13	27	59	−32	21	
11	Vålerenga 2 (R)	22	3	3	16	27	58	−31	12	Relegation to Third Division
12	Krokelvdalen (R)	22	2	6	14	21	74	−53	12	Relegation to Third Division

Source: Norwegian Football Federation (in Norwegian)
Rules for classification: 1) Points; 2) Goal difference; 3) Goals scored; 4) Head-to-head points; 5) Head-to-head goal difference; 6) Head-to-head goals scored.
(C) Champions; (P) Promoted; (R) Relegated

=== Results ===
Home \ Away	HAM	KRO	LIL	LYN	MED	RAU	RØA	STA	STR	TYN	VÅL	ØVR
HamKam	—	5–0	6–0	2–0	2–1	3–3	4–0	1–0	1–0	3–0	3–0	2–2
Krokelvdalen	0–4	—	3–3	2–1	1–1	2–4	1–2	0–5	0–5	1–3	1–1	0–2
Lillestrøm	2–1	1–1	—	0–1	1–0	1–5	3–4	3–1	2–1	1–3	4–2	3–0
Lyn 2	1–4	1–1	2–0	—	3–2	1–8	1–2	0–4	0–4	3–1	0–4	0–2
Medkila	1–5	3–0	5–1	2–2	—	1–2	3–2	1–2	2–1	3–1	4–2	0–0
Raufoss	2–0	7–0	4–2	4–1	4–1	—	6–1	0–1	1–3	2–2	4–0	0–1
Røa 2	0–2	5–0	4–2	3–0	4–1	0–2	—	1–2	1–5	3–0	1–1	1–2
Stabæk 2	0–1	7–0	1–0	2–1	0–1	2–0	2–1	—	2–2	1–2	4–0	0–2
Strømsgodset	2–3	7–3	5–1	1–2	0–0	2–2	2–0	4–2	—	2–2	4–0	1–2
Tynset	2–2	5–0	6–1	1–1	2–2	1–1	6–0	1–1	1–0	—	1–0	0–4
Vålerenga 2	0–3	0–3	1–1	4–6	4–2	2–3	1–4	0–1	3–5	2–1	—	0–2
Øvrevoll Hosle	5–0	2–2	1–0	6–0	1–0	3–0	1–4	1–1	2–1	2–2	1–0	—

Source: Norwegian Football Federation (in Norwegian)
Legend: Blue = home team win; Yellow = draw; Red = away team win.

== Promotion play-offs ==
1 November 2026
13:30 CET

KIL/Hemne	1–2	Øvrevoll Hosle
Sæbø 90'	Report	Falkman 14'; Mørch 52'

Trøndelag Sparebank Arena, Kyrksæterøra
Referee: Magnus Smørdal
8 November 2026
13:00 CET

Øvrevoll Hosle	4–1	KIL/Hemne
Falkman 13', 69'; Jansch 23'; Albretsen 86'	Report	Nikolaisen 80'

Ferd Arena Hosle, Bærum
Referee: Aland Bazaz

Øvrevoll Hosle won 6–2 on aggregate and advanced to the play-off final.
