= Ullsfjord =

Ullsfjord may refer to:

== Places ==
- Ullsfjord Municipality, a former municipality in Troms county, Norway
- Ullsfjord Church, a church in Lyngen Municipality in Troms county, Norway
- Ullsfjorden, a fjord in Lyngen and Tromsø municipalities in Troms county, Norway
- Ullsfjorden (Finnmark), a fjord in Loppa Municipality in Finnmark county, Norway
