= Kroken =

Kroken may refer to:

== People ==
- Erling Kroken (born 1928), a Norwegian ski jumper who competed in the early 1950s
- Sven Kroken (born 1944), Norwegian curler, European champion

== Places ==
- Kroken, Akershus, a village in Skedsmo municipality in Akershus county, Norway
- Kroken, Aust-Agder, a village in Grimstad municipality in Aust-Agder county, Norway
- Kroken, Troms, an area in the city of Tromsø in Tromsø municipality in Troms county, Norway
  - Kroken Church, a church in the city of Tromsø, Norway
- Kroken, Telemark, a village in Drangedal municipality in Telemark county, Norway
- Kroken, Trøndelag, a village in Røros municipality in Trøndelag county, Norway
