= Tromsøysund Municipality =

Former municipality in Troms, Norway

Tromsøysund Municipality Tromsøysund herred
- Former municipality
- Tromsøsundet herred (historic name); Tromsøe landdistrikt (historic name)
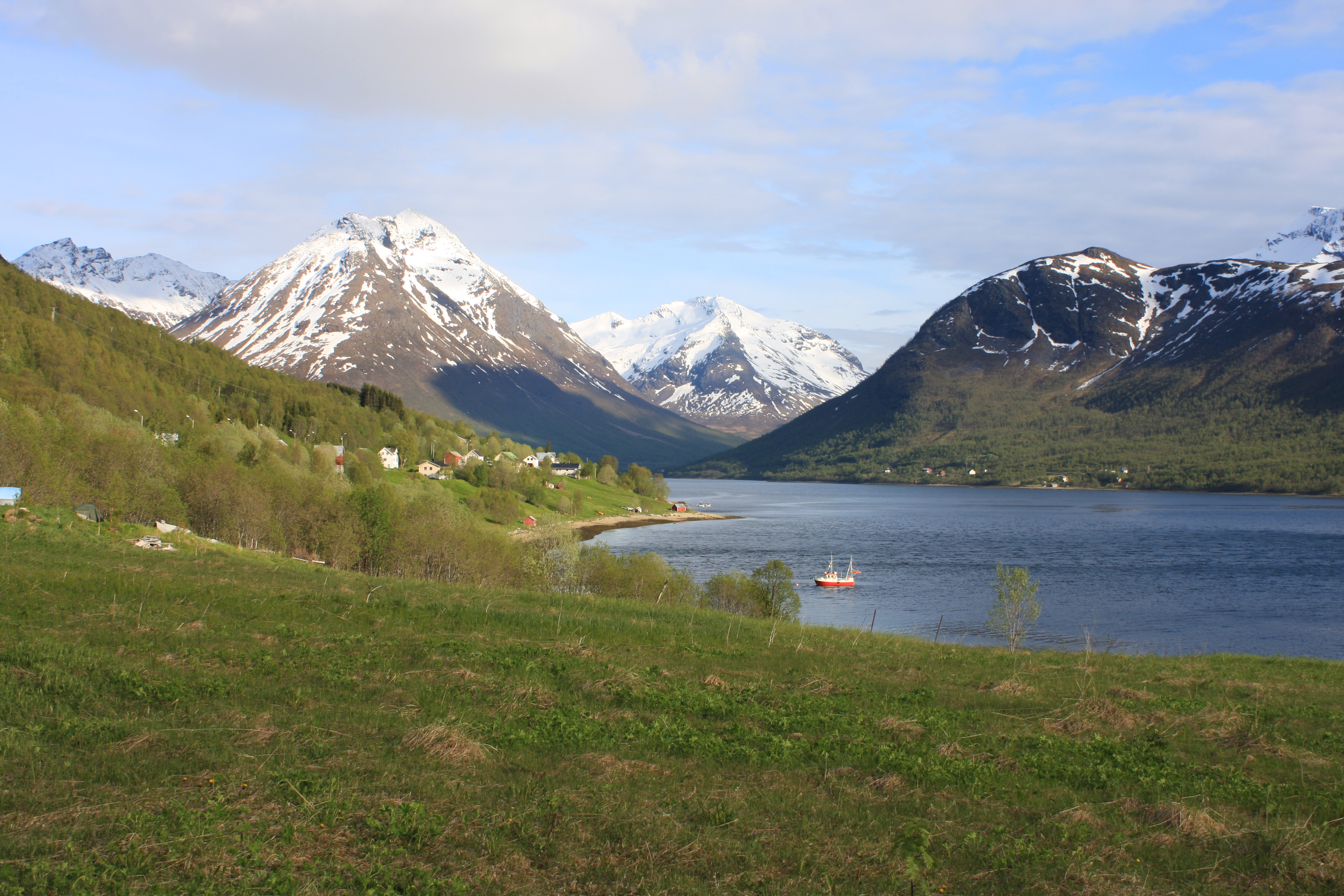
- Arm of the Ramfjorden in Tromsøysund

- Coat of arms

- Troms within Norway

- Tromsøysund within Troms
- Coordinates: 69°38′53″N 18°59′13″E
- Country: Norway
- County: Troms
- District: Hålogaland
- Established: 1 Jan 1838
  - Created as: Formannskapsdistrikt
- Disestablished: 1 Jan 1964
  - Succeeded by: Tromsø Municipality
- Administrative centre: Tromsøysund

Area (upon dissolution)
  - Total: 1,529.93 km^{2} (590.71 sq mi)
  - Rank: #42 in Norway
- Highest elevation: 1,169 m (3,835 ft)

Population (1963)
  - Total: 16,191
  - Rank: #25 in Norway
  - Density: 10.6/km^{2} (27/sq mi)
  - Change (10 years): ▲ +29.9%
- Demonym: Tromsøysund-folk

Official language
  - Norwegian form: Neutral
- Time zone: UTC+01:00 (CET)
  - Summer (DST): UTC+02:00 (CEST)
- ISO 3166 code: NO-1934

Tromsøysund is a former municipality in Troms county in Norway. The 1,530-square-kilometre (590 sq mi) municipality existed from 1838 until its dissolution in 1964. The municipality encompassed most of what is now Tromsø Municipality including areas on the island of Kvaløya and on the mainland. It completely surrounded the city of Tromsø, both on a number of islands as well as on the mainland. The municipality included the villages of Bjerkaker, Tromsdalen, and Movik. The administrative centre was the village of Tromsdalen, just across the strait from the city of Tromsø.

Prior to its dissolution in 1964, the 1,529.9-square-kilometre (590.7 sq mi) municipality was the 42nd largest by area out of the 689 municipalities in Norway. Tromsøysund Municipality was the 25th most populous municipality in Norway with a population of about 16,191. The municipality's population density was 10.6 inhabitants per square kilometre (27/sq mi) and its population had increased by 29.9% over the previous 10-year period.

== General information ==
The large prestegjeld (parish) of Tromsøe existed for hundreds of years. In 1838, the new formannskapsdistrikt law established municipal self-government in Norway. According to the law, each prestegjeld became a municipality, but all cities in Norway had to be separated from their prestegjeld and be their own city-municipalities. So, on 1 January 1838, the city of Tromsøe became a municipality and the large surrounding district became a municipality called Tromsøe landdistrikt. Initially, the new municipality had a population of 4,286.

In 1860, the southern part of the municipality (population: 3,610) was split off from Tromsøe landdistrikt to become the new Balsfjord Municipality. This left Tromsøe landdistrikt with 2,632 inhabitants. In November 1860, the name of the municipality was changed to Tromsøsundet (the spelling was changed to the more modern spelling Tromsøysund later). On 1 January 1861, one area of Tromsøysund (population: 110) was transferred into the city of Tromsø. On 1 January 1873, a part of the neighboring Malangen Municipality (population: 287) was merged back into Tromsøysund (this area in Malangen had been separated from Balsfjord in 1871). This area included the Bakkejord-Kvalnes-Lauksletta-Mjelde area on the southern part of the island of Kvaløya and the Brokskar-Bentsjorda area on the mainland. At the same time, an uninhabited part of Tromsøysund was also transferred into the city of Tromsø. On 1 July 1915, another part of Tromsøysund (population: 512) was transferred into the city of Tromsø. Again on 1 July 1955, the Bjerkaker area of Tromsøysund (population: 1,583) was transferred to the city of Tromsø.

During the 1960s, there were many municipal mergers across Norway due to the work of the Schei Committee. On 1 January 1964, a major municipal merger took place. All of Tromsøysund Municipality (population: 16,727) was merged with the city of Tromsø (population: 12,602), the parts of Hillesøy Municipality on Kvaløya island (population: 1,316), and most (except the Svensby area) of Ullsfjord Municipality (population: 2,019) to form a new, larger Tromsø Municipality.

=== Name ===
The municipality (originally the parish) was originally named Tromsøe landdistrikt, which means the rural district around Tromsø. In 1860, the name of the municipality was changed to Tromsøsundet, after the local Tromsøysundet strait. The first element of the name comes from the island of Tromsøya (Old Norse: Trums). The meaning of the name is uncertain. The last element is sund which means "strait" or "sound". On 6 January 1908, a royal resolution changed the spelling of the name of the municipality to Tromsøysund.

=== Coat of arms ===
The coat of arms was granted on 9 April 1954. The official blazon is "Gules, a two-masted ship Or" (Norwegian: På rød bunn et tomastet gull skip). This means the arms have a red field (background) and the charge is a two-masted ship. The ship has a tincture of Or which means it is commonly colored yellow, but if it is made out of metal, then gold is used. The boat symbolized the importance of the sea and fishing for the municipality. The arms were designed by Sverre Mack who was helped by Hallvard Trætteberg. This coat of arms was the first municipal coat of arms for a rural municipality in Norway (previously, arms had been used for towns and cities, but not rural locations).

=== Churches ===
The Church of Norway had one parish (sokn) within Tromsøysund Municipality. It was part of the Tromsøysund prestegjeld and the Tromsø domprosti (arch-deanery) in the Diocese of Nord-Hålogaland.

Churches in Tromsøysund Municipality
Parish (sokn)	Church name	Location of the church	Year built
Tromsøysund	Tromsøysund Church	Tromsøya	1861

== Geography ==
The highest point in the municipality was the 1,169-metre (3,835 ft) tall mountain Bentsjordtinden.

== Government ==
While it existed, Tromsøysund Municipality was responsible for primary education (through 10th grade), outpatient health services, senior citizen services, welfare and other social services, zoning, economic development, and municipal roads and utilities. The municipality was governed by a municipal council of directly elected representatives. The mayor was indirectly elected by a vote of the municipal council. The municipality was under the jurisdiction of the Hålogaland Court of Appeal.

=== Municipal council ===
The municipal council (Kommunestyre) of Tromsøysund Municipality was made up of 53 representatives that were elected to four year terms. The tables below show the historical composition of the council by political party.

Tromsøysund herredsstyre 1959–1963
Party name (in Norwegian)	Number of representatives
Labour Party (Arbeiderpartiet)	30
Conservative Party (Høyre)	5
Communist Party (Kommunistiske Parti)	3
Christian Democratic Party (Kristelig Folkeparti)	3
Liberal Party (Venstre)	12
Total number of members:	53
Note: On 1 January 1964, Tromsøysund Municipality became part of Tromsø Municipality.

Tromsøysund herredsstyre 1955–1959
Party name (in Norwegian)	Number of representatives
Labour Party (Arbeiderpartiet)	25
Conservative Party (Høyre)	2
Communist Party (Kommunistiske Parti)	3
Christian Democratic Party (Kristelig Folkeparti)	3
Farmers' Party (Bondepartiet)	1
Liberal Party (Venstre)	11
Total number of members:	45

Tromsøysund herredsstyre 1951–1955
Party name (in Norwegian)	Number of representatives
Labour Party (Arbeiderpartiet)	15
Conservative Party (Høyre)	2
Communist Party (Kommunistiske Parti)	4
Liberal Party (Venstre)	11
List of workers, fishermen, and small farmholders (Arbeidere, fiskere, småbrukere liste)	4
Total number of members:	36

Tromsøysund herredsstyre 1947–1951
Party name (in Norwegian)	Number of representatives
Labour Party (Arbeiderpartiet)	19
Communist Party (Kommunistiske Parti)	4
Liberal Party (Venstre)	8
Local List(s) (Lokale lister)	5
Total number of members:	36

Tromsøysund herredsstyre 1945–1947
Party name (in Norwegian)	Number of representatives
Labour Party (Arbeiderpartiet)	22
Communist Party (Kommunistiske Parti)	5
Liberal Party (Venstre)	9
Total number of members:	36

Tromsøysund herredsstyre 1937–1941*
Party name (in Norwegian)	Number of representatives
Labour Party (Arbeiderpartiet)	19
Joint List(s) of Non-Socialist Parties (Borgerlige Felleslister)	13
Local List(s) (Lokale lister)	4
Total number of members:	36
Note: Due to the German occupation of Norway during World War II, no elections were held for new municipal councils until after the war ended in 1945.

=== Mayors ===
The mayor (Norwegian: ordfører) of Tromsøysund Municipality was the political leader of the municipality and the chairperson of the municipal council. The following people have held this position:

- 1838–1842: Leonhard Holmboe
- 1842–1844: Hans Kiil Larsen
- 1844–1848: Hans Simon Christoffersen
- 1848–1852: Peder Jeremias Larsen
- 1852–1854: Hans Lokkert Nilsen
- 1854–1857: Hans A. Moursund, Jr.
- 1857–1859: Hans Henrik Kjær
- 1859–1861: Hans Bergesen Holmeslett
- 1861–1865: Lars Moe
- 1865–1866: Hans Bergesen Holmeslett
- 1867–1875: Petter Jensen
- 1875–1876: Hans Bergesen Holmeslett
- 1877–1898: P. Chr. Nikolaisen
- 1899–1910: Hans Pedersen Berg
- 1911–1913: Hans Nilsen Finnvik
- 1914–1916: Ole M. Gausdal
- 1917–1925: Iver Walnum
- 1926–1928: Anton Jakobsen
- 1929–1931: Alfred Hansen
- 1932–1934: Anton Jakobsen
- 1935–1940: Alfred Hansen
- 1941–1941: Otto Hj. Munthe-Kaas
- 1941–1943: Theodor Hansen
- 1943–1944: Einar W. Nilsen
- 1944–1944: Fritz Posti
- 1945–1945: Johan Smith Meyer
- 1945–1948: Alfred Hansen
- 1948–1961: Kåre Martin Hansen
- 1962–1963: Kåre Nordgård

== See also ==
- List of former municipalities of Norway
