= 2025 Norwegian Second Division (women) =

Norwegian football season

Norwegian Second Division
- Season: 2025
- Dates: 12 April – 2 November
- Champions: Klepp (Group 1); Grei (Group 2)
- Promoted: Klepp; Bryne; Grei; Frigg
- Relegated: Steinkjer; Bjørnevatn; LSK Kvinner 2 Kongsvinger
- Matches: 264
- Goals: 1,057 (4 per match)

The 2025 Norwegian Second Division was a third-tier Norwegian women's football league season. The league consisted of 24 teams divided into two groups of 12 teams. The season started on 12 April 2025 and ended on 2 November 2025, not including play-off matches.

== Group 1 ==
=== League table ===
| Pos | Team | Pld | W | D | L | GF | GA | GD | Pts | Promotion, qualification or relegation |
|---|---|---|---|---|---|---|---|---|---|---|
| 1 | Klepp (C, P) | 22 | 17 | 3 | 2 | 64 | 20 | +44 | 54 | Promotion to First Division |
| 2 | Bryne (O, P) | 22 | 15 | 4 | 3 | 67 | 20 | +47 | 49 | Qualification for the promotion play-offs |
| 3 | Sarpsborg 08 | 22 | 15 | 2 | 5 | 62 | 28 | +34 | 47 | |
| 4 | Amazon Grimstad | 22 | 12 | 2 | 8 | 44 | 33 | +11 | 38 | |
| 5 | Fana | 22 | 11 | 2 | 9 | 41 | 29 | +12 | 35 | |
| 6 | Tiller | 22 | 9 | 6 | 7 | 53 | 42 | +11 | 33 | |
| 7 | Øvrevoll Hosle | 22 | 8 | 4 | 10 | 35 | 37 | −2 | 28 | |
| 8 | Vålerenga 2 | 22 | 7 | 6 | 9 | 35 | 45 | −10 | 27 | |
| 9 | Lillestrøm | 22 | 6 | 5 | 11 | 34 | 48 | −14 | 23 | |
| 10 | Rosenborg 2 | 22 | 6 | 1 | 15 | 42 | 65 | −23 | 19 | |
| 11 | Tynset (Note: Tynset avoided relegation as the best 11th-placed team.) | 22 | 6 | 1 | 15 | 32 | 60 | −28 | 19 | |
| 12 | Steinkjer (R) | 22 | 1 | 2 | 19 | 24 | 106 | −82 | 5 | Relegation to Third Division |

Source: Norwegian Football Federation (in Norwegian)
Rules for classification: 1) Points; 2) Goal difference; 3) Goals scored; 4) Head-to-head points; 5) Head-to-head goal difference; 6) Head-to-head goals scored.
(C) Champions; (O) Play-off winners; (P) Promoted; (R) Relegated

=== Results ===
| Home \ Away | AMA | BRY | FAN | KLE | LIL | ROS | SAR | STE | TIL | TYN | VÅL | ØVR |
|---|---|---|---|---|---|---|---|---|---|---|---|---|
| Amazon Grimstad | — | 0–0 | 1–4 | 3–2 | 1–0 | 3–0 | 1–2 | 7–0 | 1–3 | 5–0 | 3–1 | 2–0 |
| Bryne | 0–1 | — | 2–2 | 1–0 | 8–0 | 4–0 | 1–0 | 11–0 | 2–3 | 5–4 | 4–1 | 1–0 |
| Fana | 0–2 | 0–1 | — | 0–1 | 5–1 | 2–2 | 0–1 | 4–2 | 2–1 | 4–1 | 2–0 | 3–2 |
| Klepp | 5–4 | 2–0 | 1–0 | — | 5–2 | 8–1 | 3–0 | 8–1 | 1–0 | 4–0 | 1–1 | 3–1 |
| Lillestrøm | 2–0 | 1–2 | 1–0 | 0–3 | — | 3–0 | 1–2 | 2–1 | 1–2 | 6–0 | 2–2 | 2–2 |
| Rosenborg 2 | 4–1 | 1–5 | 3–2 | 0–3 | 4–2 | — | 0–4 | 10–0 | 0–3 | 0–3 | 2–4 | 0–1 |
| Sarpsborg 08 | 5–2 | 1–1 | 2–1 | 3–4 | 2–0 | 5–2 | — | 3–1 | 5–0 | 3–0 | 4–4 | 3–1 |
| Steinkjer | 0–2 | 0–2 | 0–1 | 1–4 | 2–2 | 2–8 | 0–10 | — | 1–8 | 2–3 | 3–1 | 1–3 |
| Tiller | 1–1 | 0–3 | 3–1 | 1–1 | 2–2 | 2–3 | 2–4 | 4–4 | — | 2–3 | 5–1 | 4–1 |
| Tynset | 1–2 | 1–6 | 1–2 | 0–2 | 1–1 | 2–1 | 1–2 | 5–0 | 2–4 | — | 2–3 | 1–0 |
| Vålerenga 2 | 0–1 | 0–5 | 0–3 | 1–1 | 1–3 | 3–1 | 1–0 | 4–0 | 1–1 | 4–1 | — | 1–0 |
| Øvrevoll Hosle | 3–1 | 3–3 | 1–3 | 0–2 | 3–0 | 3–0 | 2–1 | 4–3 | 2–2 | 2–0 | 1–1 | — |

Source: Norwegian Football Federation
Legend: Blue = home team win; Yellow = draw; Red = away team win.

== Group 2 ==
=== League table ===
| Pos | Team | Pld | W | D | L | GF | GA | GD | Pts | Promotion, qualification or relegation |
|---|---|---|---|---|---|---|---|---|---|---|
| 1 | Grei (C, P) | 22 | 18 | 2 | 2 | 74 | 23 | +51 | 56 | Promotion to First Division |
| 2 | Frigg (O, P) | 22 | 17 | 1 | 4 | 56 | 27 | +29 | 52 | Qualification for the promotion play-offs |
| 3 | Stabæk 2 | 22 | 14 | 3 | 5 | 58 | 24 | +34 | 45 | |
| 4 | Medkila | 22 | 13 | 4 | 5 | 41 | 23 | +18 | 43 | |
| 5 | Sandefjord | 22 | 10 | 2 | 10 | 52 | 38 | +14 | 32 | |
| 6 | Sogndal | 22 | 10 | 2 | 10 | 47 | 46 | +1 | 32 | |
| 7 | Røa 2 | 22 | 9 | 4 | 9 | 42 | 41 | +1 | 31 | |
| 8 | KFUM | 22 | 8 | 0 | 14 | 29 | 46 | −17 | 24 | |
| 9 | Lyn 2 | 22 | 8 | 0 | 14 | 41 | 61 | −20 | 24 | |
| 10 | Bjørnevatn (Note: Bjørnevatn withdrew post-season.) (R) | 22 | 5 | 4 | 13 | 30 | 54 | −24 | 19 | Relegation to Third Division |
| 11 | LSK Kvinner 2 (R) | 22 | 4 | 3 | 15 | 28 | 67 | −39 | 15 | Relegation to Third Division |
| 12 | Kongsvinger (R) | 22 | 2 | 3 | 17 | 26 | 74 | −48 | 9 | Relegation to Third Division |

Source: Norwegian Football Federation (in Norwegian)
Rules for classification: 1) Points; 2) Goal difference; 3) Goals scored; 4) Head-to-head points; 5) Head-to-head goal difference; 6) Head-to-head goals scored.
(C) Champions; (O) Play-off winners; (P) Promoted; (R) Relegated

=== Results ===
| Home \ Away | BJØ | FRI | GRE | KFU | KON | LSK | LYN | MED | RØA | SAN | SOG | STA |
|---|---|---|---|---|---|---|---|---|---|---|---|---|
| Bjørnevatn | — | 2–4 | 1–4 | 1–2 | 1–2 | 2–1 | 3–1 | 1–1 | 1–2 | 2–2 | 2–3 | 2–1 |
| Frigg | 6–0 | — | 1–3 | 1–0 | 3–0 | 3–1 | 3–1 | 1–2 | 2–0 | 2–1 | 2–1 | 3–3 |
| Grei | 6–1 | 0–2 | — | 5–3 | 2–2 | 7–1 | 10–1 | 1–2 | 3–2 | 4–1 | 4–0 | 2–1 |
| KFUM | 3–0 | 1–3 | 0–1 | — | 3–2 | 3–2 | 0–5 | 0–1 | 2–0 | 0–1 | 0–3 | 0–3 |
| Kongsvinger | 2–1 | 3–4 | 1–5 | 0–3 | — | 2–2 | 1–2 | 2–2 | 2–5 | 0–5 | 1–2 | 0–5 |
| LSK Kvinner 2 | 0–3 | 1–4 | 0–3 | 0–1 | 4–1 | — | 1–3 | 0–7 | 1–1 | 2–4 | 3–2 | 0–4 |
| Lyn 2 | 1–3 | 1–5 | 0–5 | 3–5 | 4–0 | 1–3 | — | 0–1 | 0–4 | 4–1 | 5–4 | 1–2 |
| Medkila | 2–2 | 0–1 | 0–2 | 2–0 | 3–0 | 3–0 | 2–0 | — | 3–2 | 2–0 | 2–1 | 3–1 |
| Røa 2 | 1–1 | 4–1 | 0–1 | 4–1 | 3–1 | 2–2 | 1–2 | 3–1 | — | 1–1 | 3–1 | 1–5 |
| Sandefjord | 3–1 | 1–2 | 0–1 | 1–0 | 4–0 | 7–1 | 2–3 | 3–0 | 6–1 | — | 5–1 | 0–4 |
| Sogndal | 2–0 | 2–1 | 1–2 | 4–1 | 6–4 | 3–1 | 2–1 | 2–2 | 1–2 | 5–2 | — | 1–1 |
| Stabæk 2 | 5–0 | 0–2 | 3–3 | 3–1 | 5–0 | 1–2 | 3–2 | 1–0 | 3–0 | 2–1 | 2–0 | — |

Source: Norwegian Football Federation
Legend: Blue = home team win; Yellow = draw; Red = away team win.

== Promotion play-offs ==
9 November 2025
14:00 CET

| Frigg | 1–1 | Bryne |
|---|---|---|
| Aamaas 84' | Report | Nesse 32' |

Tørteberg Kunstgress, Oslo
Attendance: 192
Referee: Marit Hamel
15 November 2025
13:00 CET

| Bryne | 0–1 | Frigg |
|---|---|---|
| | Report | Gooderham 61' |

Aarbakkebanen, Bryne
Referee: Vilde Sølverud Larsen

Frigg won 2–1 on aggregate and were promoted. Bryne advanced to the play-off final.
