= Mohammed Ahamed =

Norwegian-Somali footballer (born 1985)

Mohammed Ahamed egag
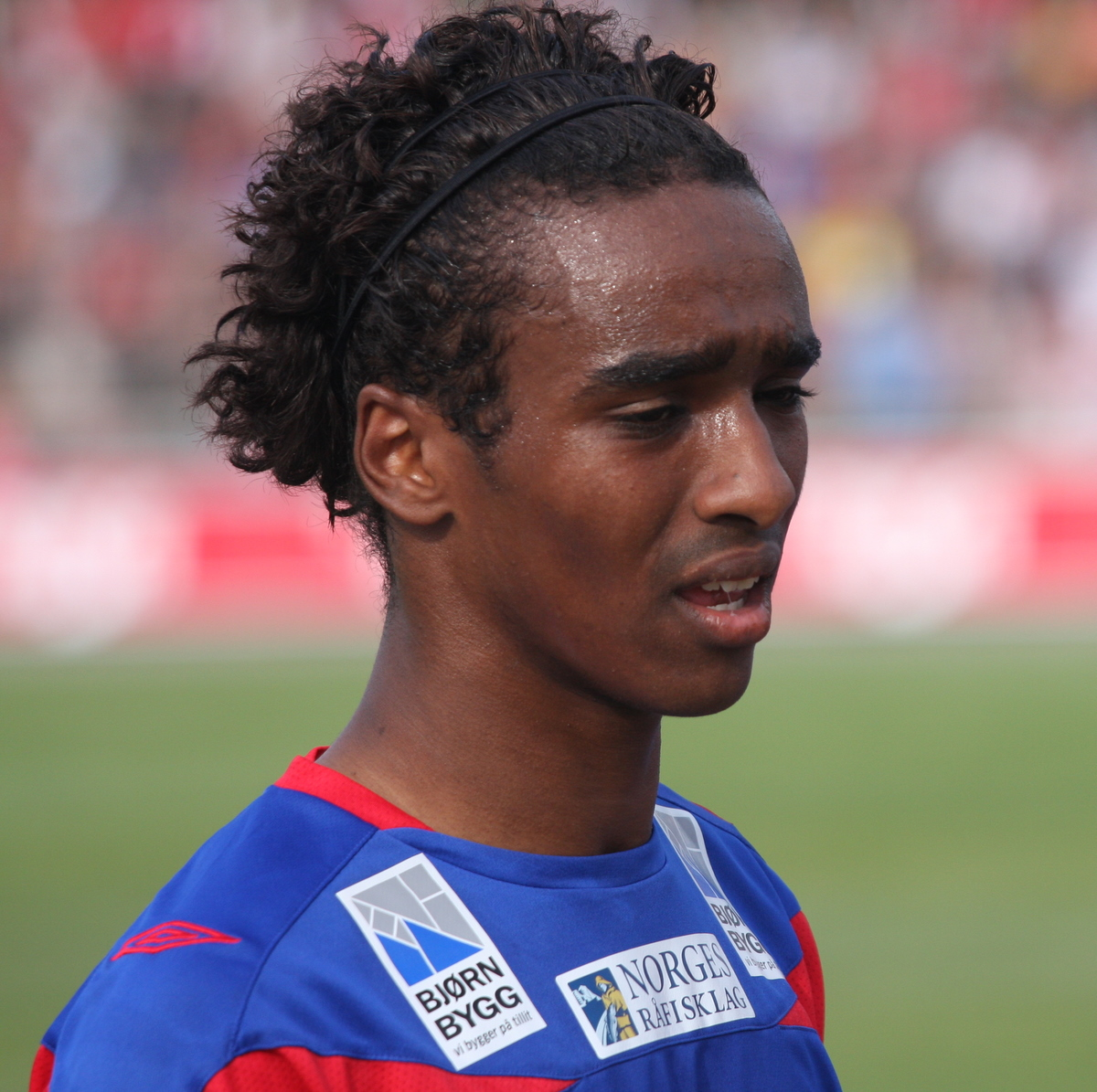
- Ahamed in 2009

Personal information
- Full name: Mohammed Ahamed Jama egag
- Date of birth: 5 August 1985 (age 41)
- Place of birth: Garowe, Somalia
- Height: 1.70 m (5 ft 7 in)
- Position: Forward

Youth career
- Tromsø
- Fløya

Senior career*
| Years | Team | Apps | (Gls) |
| 2003–2006 | Fløya | | |
| 2006–2009 | Tromsdalen | 92 | (54) |
| 2009–2012 | Tromsø | 43 | (21) |
| 2011 | → Sarpsborg 08 (loan) | 11 | (7) |
| 2012–2019 | Tromsdalen | 102 | (74) |
| 2019 | Krokelvdalen | 16 | (6) |
| 2020 | Tromsø | 16 | (11) |
| 2021 | Valhall | 5 | (7) |
- * Club domestic league appearances and goals

Mohammed Ahmed Jama (born 5 August 1985), commonly known as Mohammed Ahamed egag or just Egag, is a former professional footballer who played as a forward.

== Early life ==
Born in Garowe, Somaliland, Ahamed emigrated to Norway.

== Career ==
After playing for Fløya's first-team, Ahamed moved to Tromsdalen in 2006, and he signed for Tippeligaen-side Tromsø in 2009. During Tromsø IL's Europa League qualification play off, Ahamed scored in the 5–0 first leg defeat of Latvian club Daugava Daugavpils. He played a total of 45 matches and scored three goals for Tromsø in Tippeligaen, with all the goals coming in 2010.

He was loaned out from Tromsø to Sarpsborg 08 from 1 August 2011 till the end of the season. On 8 August 2012, Ahamed joined his old club Tromsdalen on a free transfer.

In 2019, Ahamed returned to his mother club Krokelvdalen IL.

== Career statistics ==
As of match played 15 November 2020

Appearances and goals by club, season and competition
| Club | Season | League | | | National cup | | Continental | | Total | |
| Club | Season | Division | Apps | Goals | Apps | Goals | Apps | Goals | Apps | Goals |
|---|---|---|---|---|---|---|---|---|---|---|
| Tromsdalen | 2006 | Adeccoligaen | 29 | 14 | 1 | 1 | – | | 30 | 15 |
| Tromsdalen | 2007 | Adeccoligaen | 23 | 7 | 1 | 0 | – | | 24 | 7 |
| Tromsdalen | 2008 | 2. divisjon | 22 | 8 | 1 | 1 | – | | 23 | 9 |
| Tromsdalen | 2009 | Adeccoligaen | 18 | 4 | 2 | 0 | – | | 17 | 0 |
| Tromsdalen | Total | | 92 | 33 | 5 | 2 | 0 | 0 | 96 | 35 |
| Tromsø | 2009 | Tippeligaen | 7 | 0 | 0 | 0 | – | | 7 | 0 |
| Tromsø | 2010 | Tippeligaen | 27 | 3 | 4 | 3 | – | | 31 | 6 |
| Tromsø | 2011 | Tippeligaen | 9 | 0 | 4 | 2 | 4 | 1 | 17 | 3 |
| Tromsø | 2012 | Tippeligaen | 0 | 0 | 1 | 0 | – | | 1 | 0 |
| Tromsø | Total | | 43 | 3 | 9 | 5 | 4 | 1 | 56 | 9 |
| Sarpsborg 08 (loan) | 2011 | Tippeligaen | 11 | 0 | 0 | 0 | – | | 11 | 0 |
| Tromsdalen | 2012 | Adeccoligaen | 12 | 5 | 0 | 0 | – | | 12 | 5 |
| Tromsdalen | 2013 | 2. divisjon | 1 | 0 | 0 | 0 | – | | 1 | 0 |
| Tromsdalen | 2014 | Norwegian First Division | 3 | 0 | 0 | 0 | – | | 3 | 0 |
| Tromsdalen | 2015 | 2. divisjon | 15 | 9 | 3 | 3 | – | | 18 | 12 |
| Tromsdalen | 2016 | 2. divisjon | 22 | 18 | 2 | 1 | – | | 24 | 19 |
| Tromsdalen | 2017 | Norwegian First Division | 25 | 7 | 0 | 0 | – | | 25 | 7 |
| Tromsdalen | 2018 | Norwegian First Division | 24 | 8 | 0 | 0 | – | | 24 | 8 |
| Tromsdalen | Total | | 102 | 47 | 5 | 4 | 0 | 0 | 107 | 51 |
| Krokelvdalen | 2019 | 4. divisjon | 16 | 6 | 1 | 0 | – | | 17 | 6 |
| Tromsø | 2020 | OBOS-ligaen | 16 | 1 | 0 | 0 | – | | 16 | 1 |
| Career total | | | 280 | 90 | 20 | 11 | 4 | 1 | 304 | 102 |
