= Sjursnes =

Village in Tromsø Municipality, Norway

Sjursnes (Norwegian); Várpenjárga (Northern Sami)
- Village
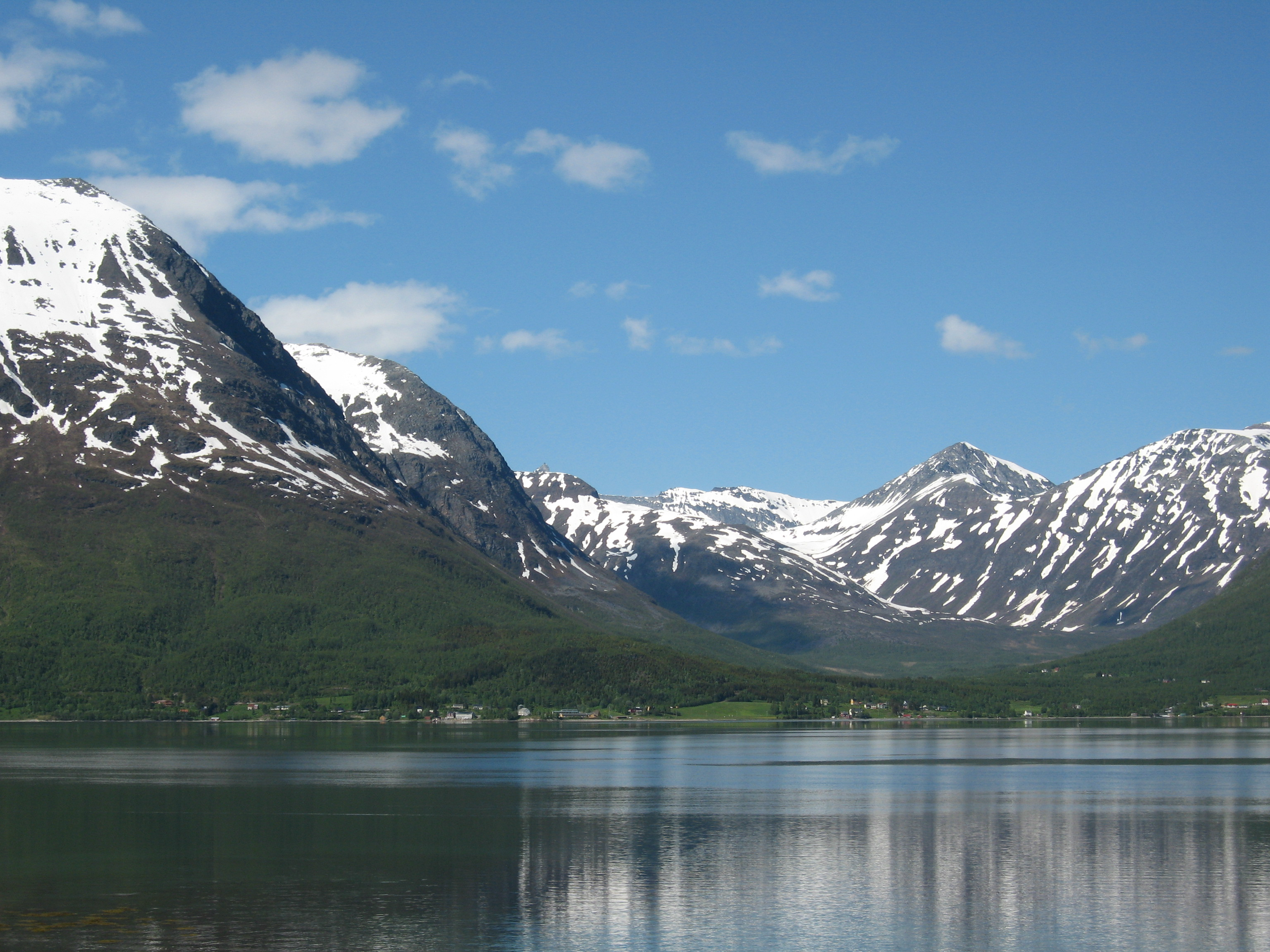
- View of the village
- Interactive map of: Sjursnes (Norwegian); Várpenjárga (Northern Sami)
- Location within Troms Location within Norway
- Coordinates: 69°32′17″N 19°38′20″E
- Country: Norway
- Region: Northern Norway
- County: Troms
- District: Midt-Troms
- Municipality: Tromsø Municipality
- Elevation: 10 m (33 ft)
- Time zone: UTC+01:00 (CET)
  - Summer (DST): UTC+02:00 (CEST)
- Post Code: 9030 Sjursnes

Sjursnes (Norwegian) or Várpenjárga (Northern Sami) is a village in Tromsø Municipality in Troms county, Norway. The village is located along the Ullsfjorden, about 30 kilometres (19 mi) southeast of the city of Tromsø. The village was the administrative centre of the old Ullsfjord Municipality which existed from 1902 until 1964.

The village is centered on agriculture and fishing. The village has a grocery store, school, doctor's offices, and Ullsfjord Church.
