= Torgeir Rugtvedt =

Norwegian footballer

Personal information
- Date of birth: 19 September 1972 (age 54)
- Position: Defender

Youth career
- –1988: Kroken
- 1989: Tromsø

Senior career*
Years	Team	Apps	(Gls)
1990–1993	Tromsø	2	(0)
1994–1995	Strindheim		
1996–1999	Odd		
2000–2002	Tollnes		

International career
1988	Norway u-16	10	(2)
1989	Norway u-17	2	(0)
1990	Norway u-18	2	(0)
- * Club domestic league appearances and goals

Torgeir Rugtvedt (born 8 August 1976) is a retired Norwegian footballer.

He hails from Kroken, Troms, and joined the local great team Tromsø IL in 1989. He was drafted into the senior team in 1990, but did not make his league debut until 1992. After a second game in 1993, he left the club for Strindheim IL. Strindheim's 1994 season ended in promotion, and Rugtvedt amassed another Tippeligaen season in 1995 with the club. Four seasons in Odd followed, with yet another first-tier spell in 1999. He finished his career in minnows Tollnes BK, continuing to reside in Skien. He had studied there, and also acquired a job as head of department in Holla og Lunde Sparebank.

He represented Norway as a youth international.
