= Frode Fermann =

Norwegian footballer (born 1975)

Personal information
- Date of birth: 29 January 1975 (age 51)
- Height: 1.75 m (5 ft 9 in)
- Position: Midfielder

Youth career
- Krokelvdalen
- Tromsø

Senior career*
Years	Team	Apps	(Gls)
1995–1996	Tromsø	10	(0)
1995	→ Silsand OIL (loan)		
1996	Cercle Brugge	9	(0)
1997–2001	Tromsø	69	(7)
2002–2004	Skarp		
2005	Skarp		
2006–2007	Kvaløysletta		

International career
1996–1997	Norway U21	12	(2)
- * Club domestic league appearances and goals

Frode Fermann (born 29 January 1975) is a retired Norwegian football midfielder.

Except for a few years as a young child in Krokelvdalen IL, Fermann spent his entire youth career in Tromsø IL. He first gained attention when the U11 team beat an Italian club in the Norway Cup. In 1993 he was invited to train with Norway U18, but was injured in the first training session. In 1996 and 1997, he was capped 12 times for Norway U21.

When Fermann became a senior player in 1995, Tromsø IL did not desire to draft him into the senior squad. They instead loaned him out to third-tier side Silsand OIL. His debut went well with two goals against Lyngen/Karnes. It was later revealed that Tromsø demanded that Fermann improved his maturity and attitudes towards football. After performing well in Silsand, he was given the chance by Tromsø in 1996.

Fermann had taken vocational training as a chef, worked as a mailman and clothing shop clerk when he suddenly got the chance play football professionally. Having played in the 1996 Eliteserien during the spring and early summer of 1996, Fermann was bought by Cercle Brugge, having been scouted while playing for Norway U21. Tore Rismo from Tromsø contacted a Belgian agent who previously had shown interest in Sigurd Rushfeldt, and made a tip about Fermann. The transfer fee was 1.6 million kr.

In the 1996-97 UEFA Cup Winners' Cup, Fermann played both Cercle Brugge's matches as they were unexpectedly eliminated by Norwegian club Brann. In the 1997-98 UEFA Cup Winners' Cup, Fermann played both legs against NK Zagreb who Tromsø eliminated. In the second round, he scored one of the goals in Tromsø's legendary 3–2 victory at home against Chelsea. Tromsø lost the away leg 7–1. Fermann was later on a fruitless trial at Aberdeen.

Fermann was purchased back by Tromsø, this time at the behest of external investors. Fermann signed a 5-year contract expiring in 2001. After three years in IF Skarp, he left in 2005, only to make a comeback in the summer. He rounded off his career in Kvaløysletta IL.
