= Krokelvdalen IL =

Multi-sports club in Tromsø, Norway

Krokelvdalen IL Koll
- Full name: Krokelvdalen Idrettslag
- Founded: 24 January 1974
- Ground: Kroken kunstgress, Kroken

Krokelvdalen Idrettslag is a Norwegian multi-sports club from Kroken, Tromsø. The club has sections for association football and floorball.

The club was founded on 24 January 1974. The club colours are maroon with black or white shorts.

The club had youth players such as Morten Kræmer, Gaute Helstrup, Frode Fermann, Torgeir Rugtvedt and Bryan Fiabema.

The men's football team currently plays in the Fourth Division, the fifth tier of Norwegian football. The women's football team currently plays in the Second Division, the third tier of Norwegian football. The women's football team last contested the Second Division, the third tier, in 2024, and made it into the first round of the cup in both 2024 and 2025. In 2026 Krokelvdalen made it to the first round, but forfeited.
