= 2026 Norwegian First Division (women) =

Association football season in Norway

Norwegian First Division
- Season: 2026
- Dates: 21 March – 24 October
- Champions: Start
- Promoted: Start; Åsane; Arna-Bjørnar
- Relegated: Frigg; Klepp
- Matches: 132
- Goals: 478 (3.62 per match)
- Top goalscorer: Ina Andresen (18 goals)

The 2026 Norwegian First Division, referred to as COOP-ligaen for sponsorship reasons, was a Norwegian second-tier women's football league season. The season started on 21 March 2026 and ended on 24 October 2026, not including play-off matches.

On 10 August 2026, Coop Norge acquired the naming rights for the competition and renamed it COOP-ligaen.

== Team changes ==
Last season, AaFK Fortuna, Haugesund and Molde were promoted to the 2026 Toppserien, while HamKam and KIL/Hemne were relegated to the 2026 Second Division.

Kolbotn were relegated from the 2025 Toppserien, while Bryne, Frigg, Grei and Klepp were promoted from the 2025 Second Division.

== League table ==
Pos	Team	Pld	W	D	L	GF	GA	GD	Pts	Promotion, qualification or relegation
1	Start (C, P)	22	18	3	1	57	18	+39	57	Promotion to Toppserien
2	Åsane (P)	22	15	6	1	49	17	+32	51	Promotion to Toppserien
3	Viking	22	15	4	3	62	21	+41	49	Qualification for the promotion play-offs
4	Arna-Bjørnar (O, P)	22	15	3	4	71	22	+49	48	Qualification for the promotion play-offs
5	Tromsø	22	10	4	8	42	22	+20	34	
6	Odd	22	7	6	9	32	33	−1	27	
7	Grei	22	8	2	12	40	52	−12	26	
8	Fyllingsdalen	22	8	0	14	32	53	−21	24	
9	Bryne	22	7	2	13	25	46	−21	23	
10	Kolbotn (O)	22	6	3	13	32	47	−15	21	Qualification for the relegation play-offs
11	Frigg (R)	22	3	1	18	14	60	−46	10	Relegation to Second Division
12	Klepp (R)	22	3	0	19	22	87	−65	9	Relegation to Second Division

Source: Norwegian Football Federation (in Norwegian)
Rules for classification: 1) Points; 2) Goal difference; 3) Goals scored; 4) Head-to-head points; 5) Head-to-head goal difference; 6) Head-to-head goals scored.
(C) Champions; (O) Play-off winners; (P) Promoted; (R) Relegated

== Results ==
Home \ Away	ARN	BRY	FRI	FYL	GRE	KLE	KOL	ODD	STA	TRO	VIK	ÅSA
Arna-Bjørnar	—	3–0	5–0	2–1	10–0	6–0	1–1	1–0	3–0	1–3	2–2	2–0
Bryne	2–6	—	2–0	0–1	5–0	1–2	1–0	0–4	0–6	2–1	0–4	0–0
Frigg	0–3	1–0	—	1–2	1–5	3–2	2–3	1–1	1–3	0–3	0–1	0–1
Fyllingsdalen	4–2	1–0	2–0	—	0–1	2–0	3–0	4–2	1–3	1–7	1–5	1–2
Grei	2–4	0–2	5–2	3–1	—	4–0	3–1	1–3	1–3	3–2	1–3	0–1
Klepp	1–9	2–6	1–2	5–4	5–4	—	1–2	1–2	0–2	0–2	0–5	1–5
Kolbotn	1–4	0–1	5–0	5–1	0–3	2–0	—	1–1	1–3	0–3	0–6	3–4
Odd	0–3	1–1	1–0	2–1	1–0	5–1	1–2	—	0–1	0–1	3–3	2–2
Start	1–0	2–0	5–0	4–0	4–2	4–0	2–1	2–1	—	1–0	5–2	2–2
Tromsø	2–3	4–1	3–0	2–1	1–1	5–0	2–2	0–0	0–0	—	1–2	0–2
Viking	0–0	2–1	3–0	6–0	2–0	5–0	3–1	3–0	3–4	1–0	—	0–1
Åsane	2–1	6–0	4–0	1–0	1–1	7–0	2–1	4–2	0–0	1–0	1–1	—

Source: Norwegian Football Federation (in Norwegian)
Legend: Blue = home team win; Yellow = draw; Red = away team win.

== Promotion play-offs ==
31 October 2026
15:00 CET

Arna-Bjørnar	3–1	Viking
Mjelde 3'; Tilseth 15'; Nigardsøy 55'	Report	Duffy 70' (o.g.)

Arna Idrettspark, Bergen
Attendance: 267
Referee: René Nordvik Skippervik
7 November 2026
15:00 CET

Viking	2–2	Arna-Bjørnar
Bakke-Andersen 8', 89'	Report	Garen 26'; Skogedal 78'

Viking Stadion, Stavanger
Attendance: 1,155
Referee: Hussain Hamid Al-Kharasani

Arna-Bjørnar won 5–3 on aggregate and advanced to the play-off final.

== Relegation play-offs ==
15 November 2026
13:00 CET

Øvrevoll Hosle	2–0	Kolbotn
Jansch 37'; Nordby 72'	Report

Ferd Arena Hosle, Bærum
Referee: Maren Hatletvedt
22 November 2026
13:00 CET

Kolbotn	4–0	Øvrevoll Hosle
Stærk 24'; Niss 62'; Matsuhisa 69', 87'	Report

Østre Greverud Idrettspark, Oppegård
Referee: Jonah Engh

Kolbotn won 4–2 on aggregate. Both clubs remained in their respective leagues.

== Top scorers ==
Rank	Player	Club	Goals
1	(Norway) Ina Andresen	Start	18
2	(Norway) Martine Kjølholdt	Viking	14
3	(Norway) Tina Skogedal	Arna-Bjørnar	13
4	(Norway) Kaja Reber Askedal	Bryne	12
4	(Sweden) Julia Elvbo	Tromsø	12
4	(Norway) Anna Nigardsøy	Arna-Bjørnar	12
7	(Norway) Christina Tsikalakis	Grei	11
8	(Norway) Marina Jensen	Åsane	10
9	(Japan) Kanna Matsuhisa	Kolbotn	9
9	(Norway) Maren Mjelde	Arna-Bjørnar	9
9	(Norway) Marion Myrvold	Start	9
