= Ullsfjord Municipality =

Former municipality in Troms, Norway

Ullsfjord Municipality Ullsfjord herred
- Former municipality
- Sørfjord herred (historic name); Sørfjorden herred (historic name)
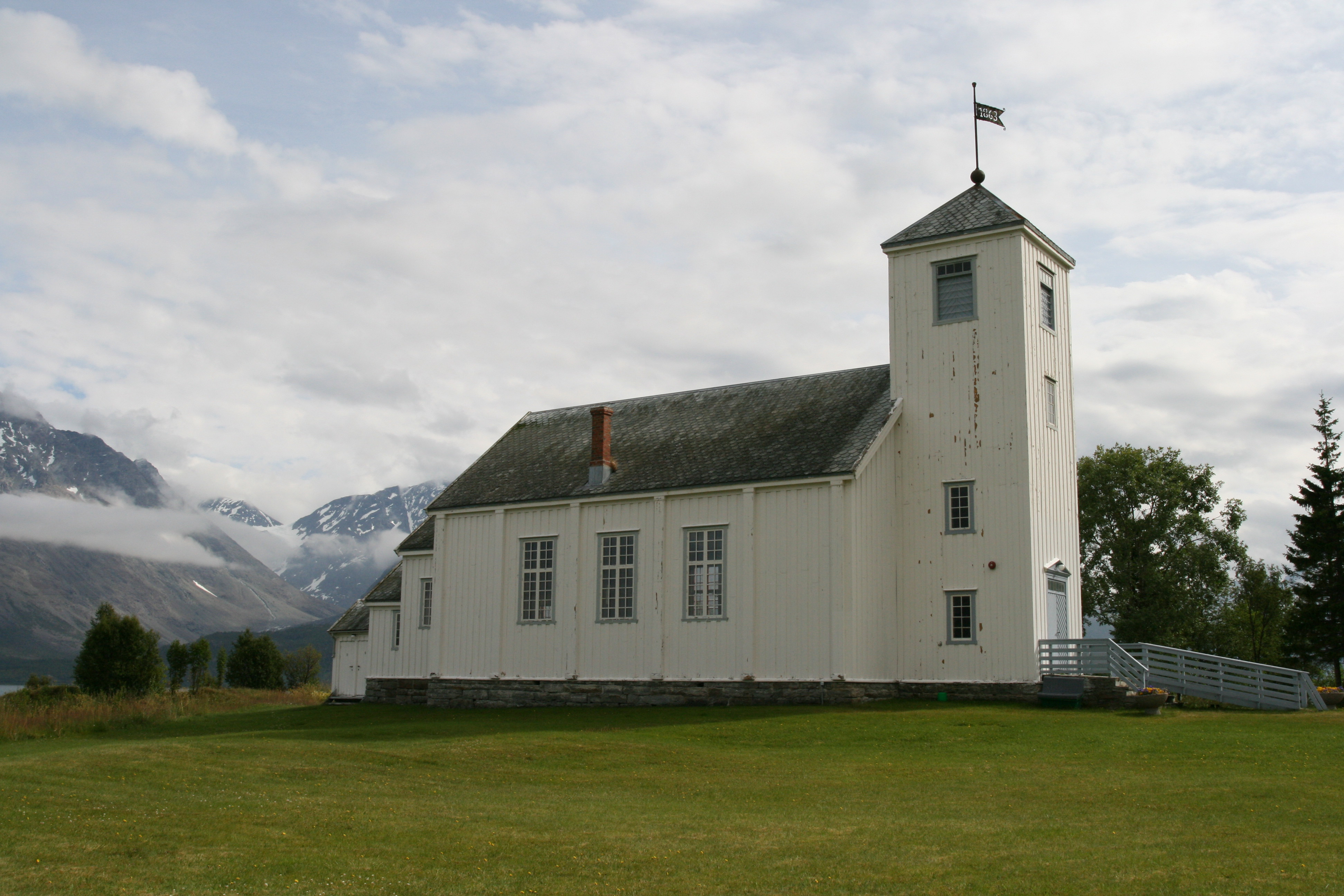
- View of Ullsfjord Church in Sjursnes

- Troms within Norway

- Ullsfjord within Troms
- Coordinates: 69°31′57″N 19°38′27″E
- Country: Norway
- County: Troms
- District: Hålogaland
- Established: 1902
  - Preceded by: Lyngen Municipality
- Disestablished: 1 Jan 1964
  - Succeeded by: Tromsø Municipality and Lyngen Municipality
- Administrative centre: Sjursnes

Government
  - Mayor (1951–1963): Hans Kristian Hauan (Ap)

Area (upon dissolution)
  - Total: 657.8 km^{2} (254.0 sq mi)
  - Rank: #150 in Norway
- Highest elevation: 1,834 m (6,017 ft)

Population (1963)
  - Total: 2,208
  - Rank: #406 in Norway
  - Density: 3.4/km^{2} (8.8/sq mi)
  - Change (10 years): ▲ +3.7%
- Demonym: Ullsfjording

Official language
  - Norwegian form: Neutral
- Time zone: UTC+01:00 (CET)
  - Summer (DST): UTC+02:00 (CEST)
- ISO 3166 code: NO-1937

Ullsfjord (historically: Sørfjord) is a former municipality in Troms county in Norway. The 658-square-kilometre (254 sq mi) municipality existed from 1902 until its dissolution in 1964. It was located in what is now the eastern part of Tromsø Municipality and the southwestern part of Lyngen Municipality. The municipality encompassed the area surrounding the Ullsfjorden between Tromsø and Lyngen municipalities. The administrative centre was the village of Sjursnes where Ullsfjord Church is located.

Prior to its dissolution in 1964, the 657.8-square-kilometre (254.0 sq mi) municipality was the 150th largest by area out of the 689 municipalities in Norway. Ullsfjord Municipality was the 406th most populous municipality in Norway with a population of about 2,208. The municipality's population density was 3.4 inhabitants per square kilometre (8.8/sq mi) and its population had increased by 3.7% over the previous 10-year period.

== General information ==
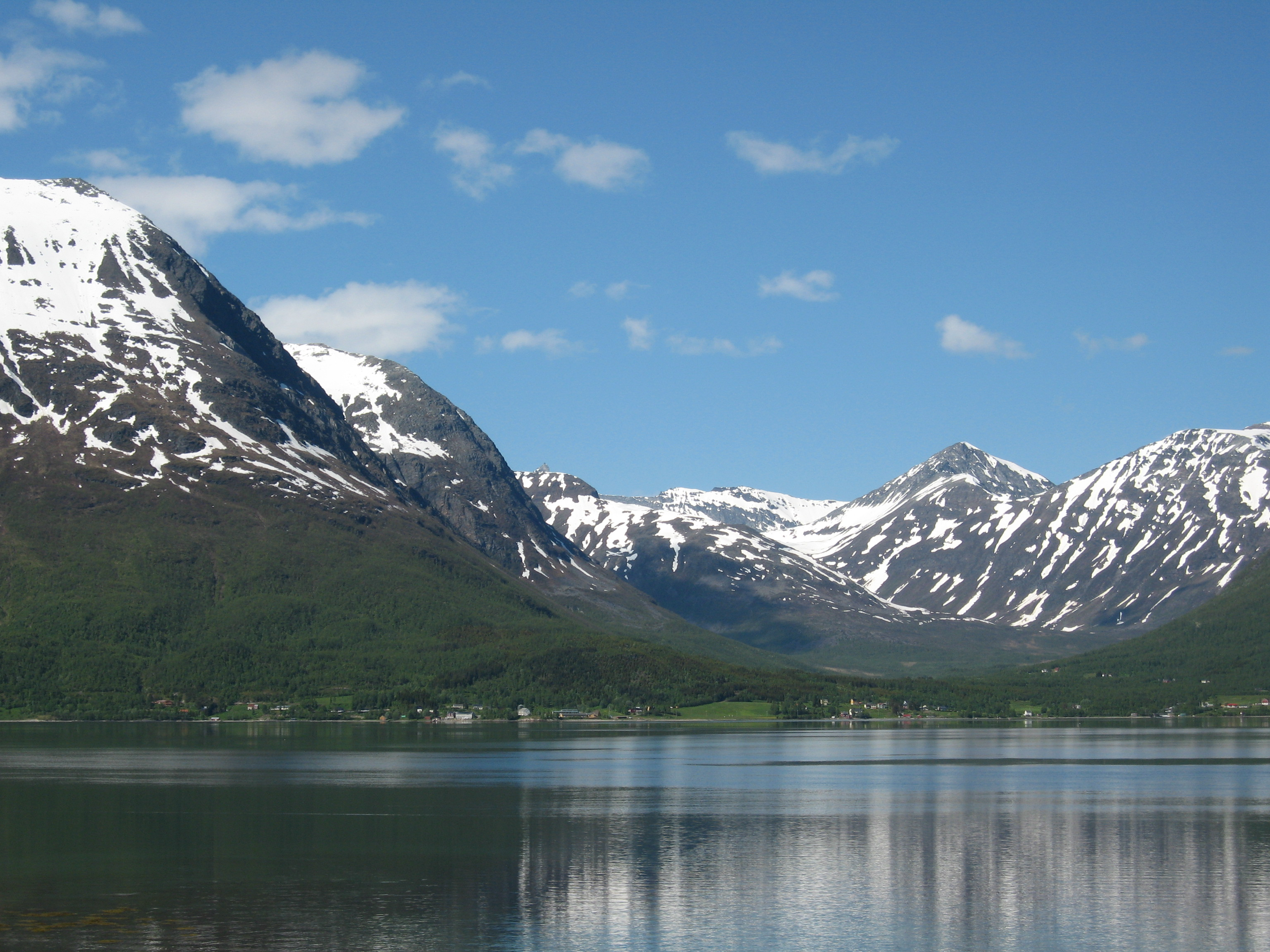
View of Sjursnes

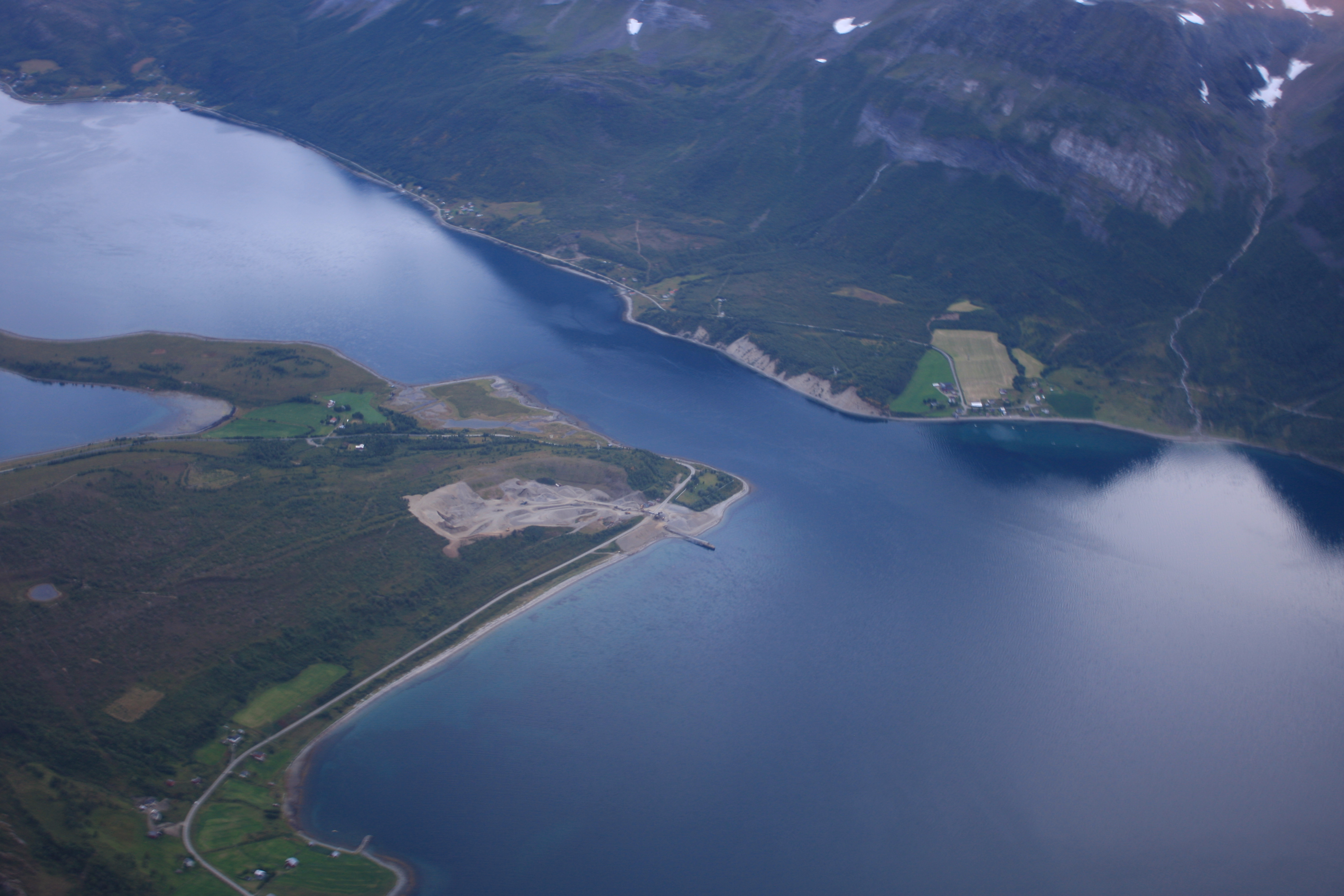
Ullsfjord area

Sørfjord Municipality (re-named Ullsfjord Municipality in 1908) was established on 1 January 1902 when Lyngen Municipality was divided in two: the western part (population: 1,139) became Sørfjord Municipality and the eastern part (population: 5,102) remained as Lyngen Municipality.

During the 1960s, there were many municipal mergers across Norway due to the work of the Schei Committee. On 1 January 1964, the municipality ceased to exist and its land was divided as follows:

- The Svensby area (population: 171) was merged with the old Lyngen Municipality (population: 2,761) and all of the mainland parts of the old Karlsøy Municipality (population: 1,001) for form a new, larger Lyngen Municipality.
- The rest of what was Ullsfjord (population: 2,019) was merged with the city of Tromsø (population: 12,602), all of Tromsøysund Municipality (population: 16,727), and the parts of Hillesøy Municipality on the island of Kvaløya (population: 1,316) to form a new, larger Tromsø Municipality.

=== Name ===
The municipality (originally the parish) is named after the Sørfjorden, a local fjord. The first element is sør which means "southern". The last element is fjord which means "fjord". This "southern fjord" is referring to a branch off the larger Ullsfjorden. Historically, the name of the municipality was spelled Sørfjorden. On 6 January 1908, a royal resolution changed the spelling of the name of the municipality to Sørfjord.

On 16 July 1937, a royal resolution changed the spelling of the name of the municipality to Ullsfjord effective 1 October 1937. This new name is the same as the local Ullsfjorden. The first element comes from the name Ullr, a god from ancient Germanic paganism. The last element is fjord which means "fjord". Thus it is the "fjord of Ullr".

=== Churches ===
The Church of Norway had one parish (sokn) within Ullsfjord Municipality. It was part of the Tromsøysund prestegjeld and the Indre Troms prosti (deanery) in the Diocese of Nord-Hålogaland.

Churches in Ullsfjord Municipality
Parish (sokn)	Church name	Location of the church	Year built
Ullsfjord	Ullsfjord Church	Sjursnes	1862

== Geography ==
The highest point in the municipality was the 1,834-metre (6,017 ft) tall mountain Jiehkkevárri which was located on the municipal boundary between Ullsfjord Municipality and Lyngen Municipality.

== Government ==
While it existed, Ullsfjord Municipality was responsible for primary education (through 10th grade), outpatient health services, senior citizen services, welfare and other social services, zoning, economic development, and municipal roads and utilities. The municipality was governed by a municipal council of directly elected representatives. The mayor was indirectly elected by a vote of the municipal council. The municipality was under the jurisdiction of the Hålogaland Court of Appeal.

=== Municipal council ===
The municipal council (Kommunestyre) of Ullsfjord Municipality was made up of 17 representatives that were elected to four year terms. The tables below show the historical composition of the council by political party.

Ullsfjord herredsstyre 1959–1963
Party name (in Norwegian)	Number of representatives
Labour Party (Arbeiderpartiet)	9
Local List(s) (Lokale lister)	8
Total number of members:	17
Note: On 1 January 1964, Ullsfjord Municipality became part of Lyngen Municipality and Tromsø Municipality.

Ullsfjord herredsstyre 1955–1959
Party name (in Norwegian)	Number of representatives
Labour Party (Arbeiderpartiet)	6
Communist Party (Kommunistiske Parti)	1
Local List(s) (Lokale lister)	10
Total number of members:	17

Ullsfjord herredsstyre 1951–1955
Party name (in Norwegian)	Number of representatives
Labour Party (Arbeiderpartiet)	7
List of workers, fishermen, and small farmholders (Arbeidere, fiskere, småbrukere liste)	2
Local List(s) (Lokale lister)	3
Total number of members:	12

Ullsfjord herredsstyre 1947–1951
Party name (in Norwegian)	Number of representatives
Labour Party (Arbeiderpartiet)	5
Local List(s) (Lokale lister)	7
Total number of members:	12

Ullsfjord herredsstyre 1945–1947
Party name (in Norwegian)	Number of representatives
Labour Party (Arbeiderpartiet)	4
List of workers, fishermen, and small farmholders (Arbeidere, fiskere, småbrukere liste)	1
Local List(s) (Lokale lister)	7
Total number of members:	12

Ullsfjord herredsstyre 1937–1941*
Party name (in Norwegian)	Number of representatives
Labour Party (Arbeiderpartiet)	9
Joint List(s) of Non-Socialist Parties (Borgerlige Felleslister)	2
Local List(s) (Lokale lister)	1
Total number of members:	12
Note: Due to the German occupation of Norway during World War II, no elections were held for new municipal councils until after the war ended in 1945.

=== Mayors ===
The mayor (Norwegian: ordfører) of Ullsfjord Municipality was the political leader of the municipality and the chairperson of the municipal council. Here is a list of people who have held this position:

- 1902–1907: Thomas Olsen
- 1908–1922: Rasmus Hansen
- 1923–1925: Jens Holmboe Giæver
- 1926–1931: Rasmus Hansen
- 1932–1941: Hans Kristian Hauan (Ap)
- 1941–1945: Ewald Storvand
- 1945–1948: Hans Kristian Hauan (Ap)
- 1948–1951: Ole Olsen
- 1952–1963: Hans Kristian Hauan (Ap)

== See also ==
- List of former municipalities of Norway
