= Ole Gausdal =

Norwegian politician (1860–1960)

Ole Martin Pettersen Gausdal (13 June 1860 – December 1960) was a Norwegian educator, newspaper editor and politician. He represented the Labour Party, but was excluded in 1920 and joined the Social Democratic Labour Party in 1921.

He was born at Gausdal near Geiranger in Sunnylven as a son of farmer and smith Petter Andreas Andersen (1829–1916) and Caroline Pedersdatter Gausdal (1834–1905). He graduated from Tromsø Teachers' College in 1880, worked briefly as a teacher in Lenvik before moving to Nordreisa where he was a teacher from 1881 to 1890. He was also municipal treasurer from 1886 to 1889 and 1903 to 1909. A founder of the Labour Party in the district, he was a member of Nordreisa municipal council, served as mayor from 1890 to 1892 and was a deputy representative to the Parliament of Norway from 1904 to 1906. He also chaired the school board. From 1895 to 1909 he was a treasurer and manager in the National Insurance Administration.

In 1909 he moved to Tromsøysund Municipality and became municipal treasurer there from 1909 to 1911. He served as mayor here from 1913 to 1916, and was elected to the Parliament of Norway in 1912 and 1915 from the constituency Tromsøsundet. In 1918 he was elected to his last term from the Lyngen Municipality constituency. For the last three terms he was a member of the Standing Committee on the Military. Here, he proposed total disarmament in Norway and abolishment of the compulsory military service, propositions which were highly controversial among the bourgeois politicians. Not all his fellow Labour Party representatives agreed completely, either. In 1920 Gausdal voted for Norwegian accession into the League of Nations. For this he was excluded from the party. In 1921 when the Social Democratic Labour Party of Norway was established, he joined their parliamentary group and was nominated on their ballot for the election the same year.

Gausdal was also known as editor-in-chief in Nordlys from 1910 to 1915, having started as a sub-editor in 1910. He died in 1960.
