= Bjerkaker =

- Neighborhood in Tromsø
- Interactive map of Bjerkaker
- Location within Troms Location within Norway
- Coordinates: 69°37′56″N 18°55′13″E
- Country: Norway
- Region: Northern Norway
- County: Troms
- District: Midt-Troms
- Municipality: Tromsø Municipality
- Elevation: 9 m (30 ft)
- Time zone: UTC+01:00 (CET)
  - Summer (DST): UTC+02:00 (CEST)
- Post Code: 9006 Tromsø

Bjerkaker is a neighborhood in the city of Tromsø in Tromsø Municipality in Troms county, Norway. It is located on the southern tip of the island of Tromsøya. Before 1 July 1955, Bjerkaker was part of the former Tromsøysund Municipality. Each summer, the Bukta Tromsø Open Air Festival is held at Telegrafbukta in Bjerkaker.

In April 2003, about 40 people met up at Bjerkaker school and founded an informal Sør-Tromsøya Borough Council. A list of the members can be found on their Web pages.

The German battleship Tirpitz was sunk by British bombers between Bjerkaker and Håkøya in 1944.

== Media gallery ==
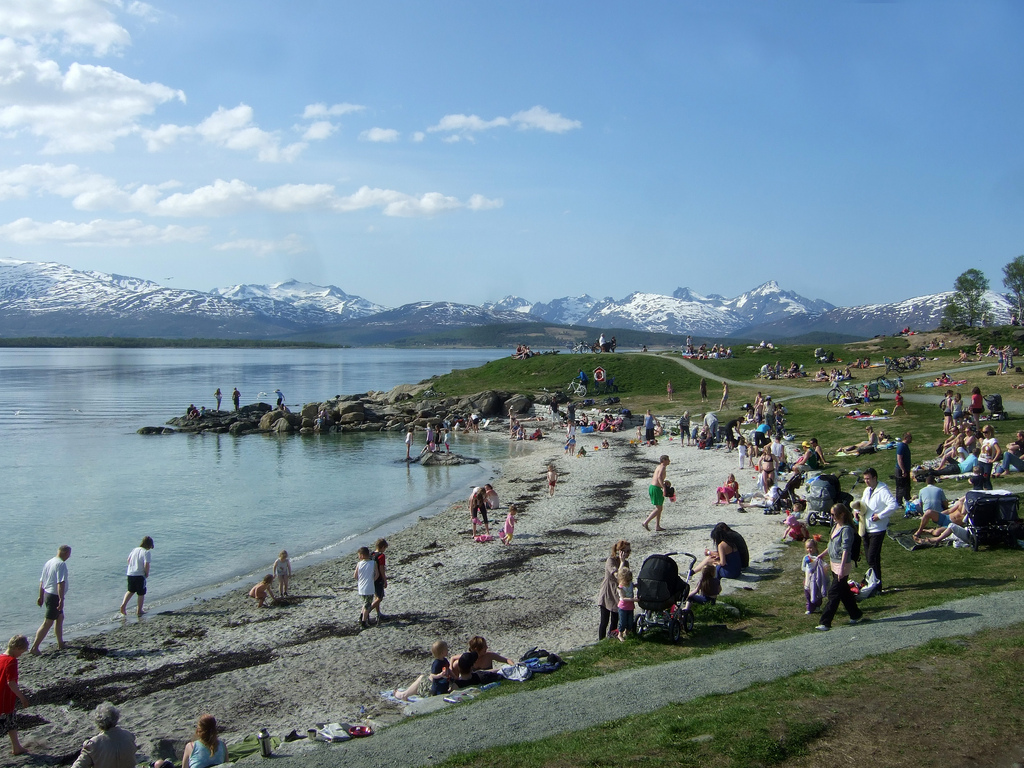
View of Telegrafbukta in southern Bjerkaker

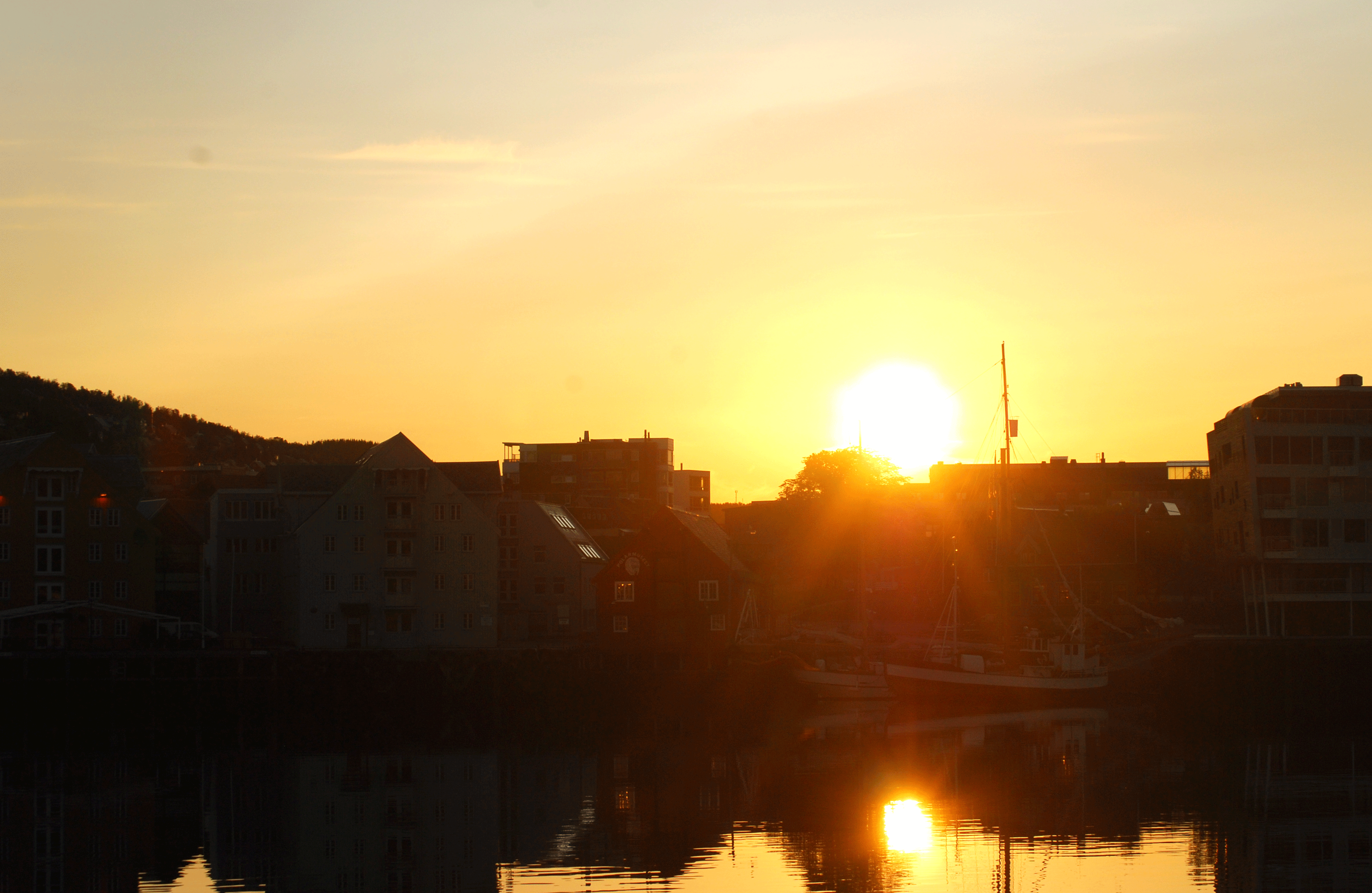
Midnight sun over Bjerkaker
