= Kroken Church =

- Kroken kirke
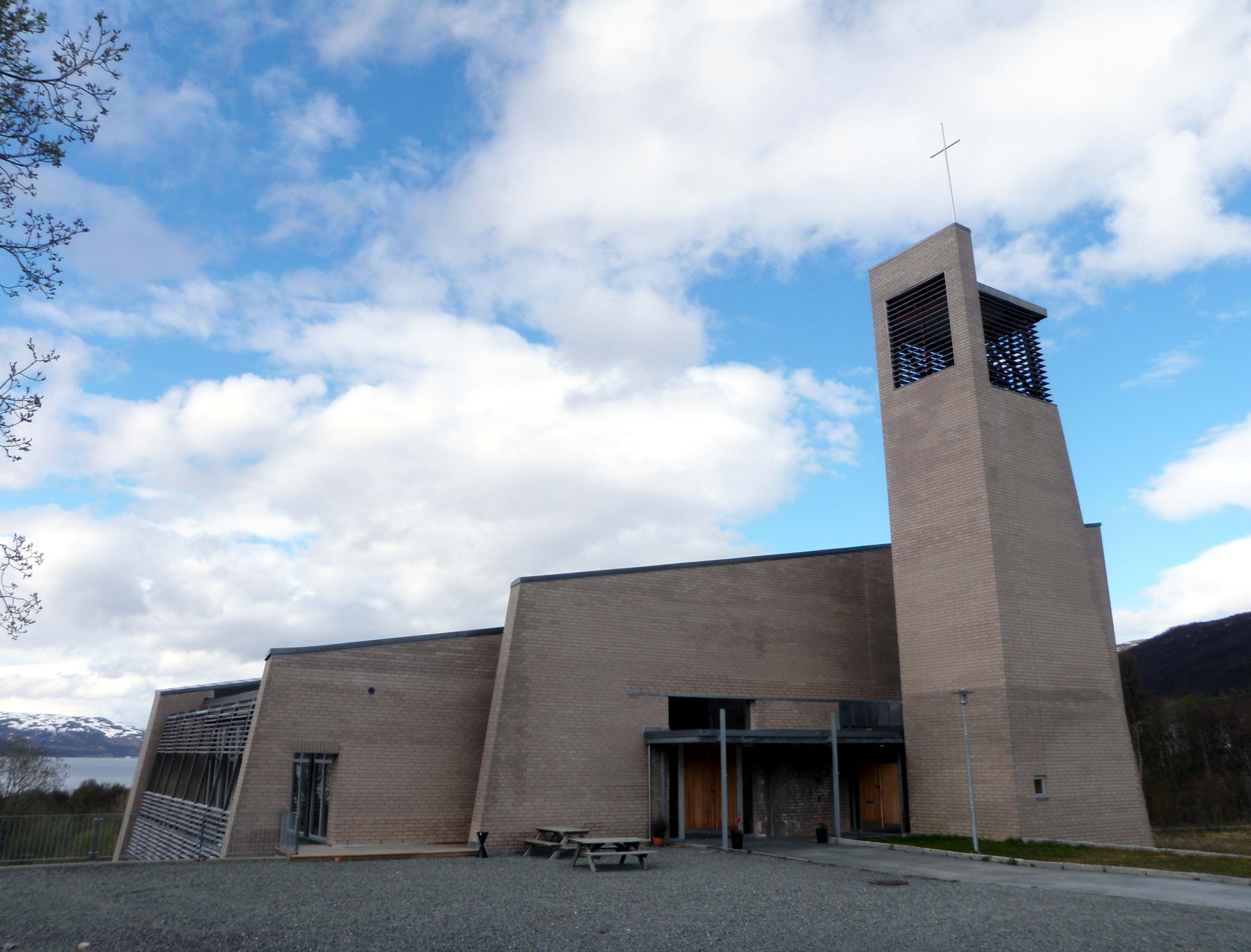
- View of the church
- Kroken Church
- 69.680809°N 19.062876°E
- Location: Tromsø Municipality, Troms
- Country: Norway
- Denomination: Church of Norway
- Churchmanship: Evangelical Lutheran

History
- Status: Parish church
- Founded: 2006
- Consecrated: 2006

Architecture
- Functional status: Active
- Architect: Nikolai Alfsen
- Architectural type: Fan-shaped
- Completed: 2006 (20 years ago)

Specifications
- Capacity: 600
- Materials: Brick

Administration
- Diocese: Nord-Hålogaland
- Deanery: Tromsø domprosti
- Parish: Kroken

Kroken Church (Norwegian: Kroken kirke) is a parish church of the Church of Norway in Tromsø Municipality in Troms county, Norway. It is located the Kroken borough in the city of Tromsø. It is the church for the Kroken parish which is part of the Tromsø domprosti (arch-deanery) in the Diocese of Nord-Hålogaland. The brown, brick church was built in a fan-shaped style in 2006 using designs drawn up by the architect Nikolai Alfsen. The church seats about 600 people.

== See also ==
- List of churches in Nord-Hålogaland
