= Movik =

Village in Tromsø Municipality, Norway

- Village
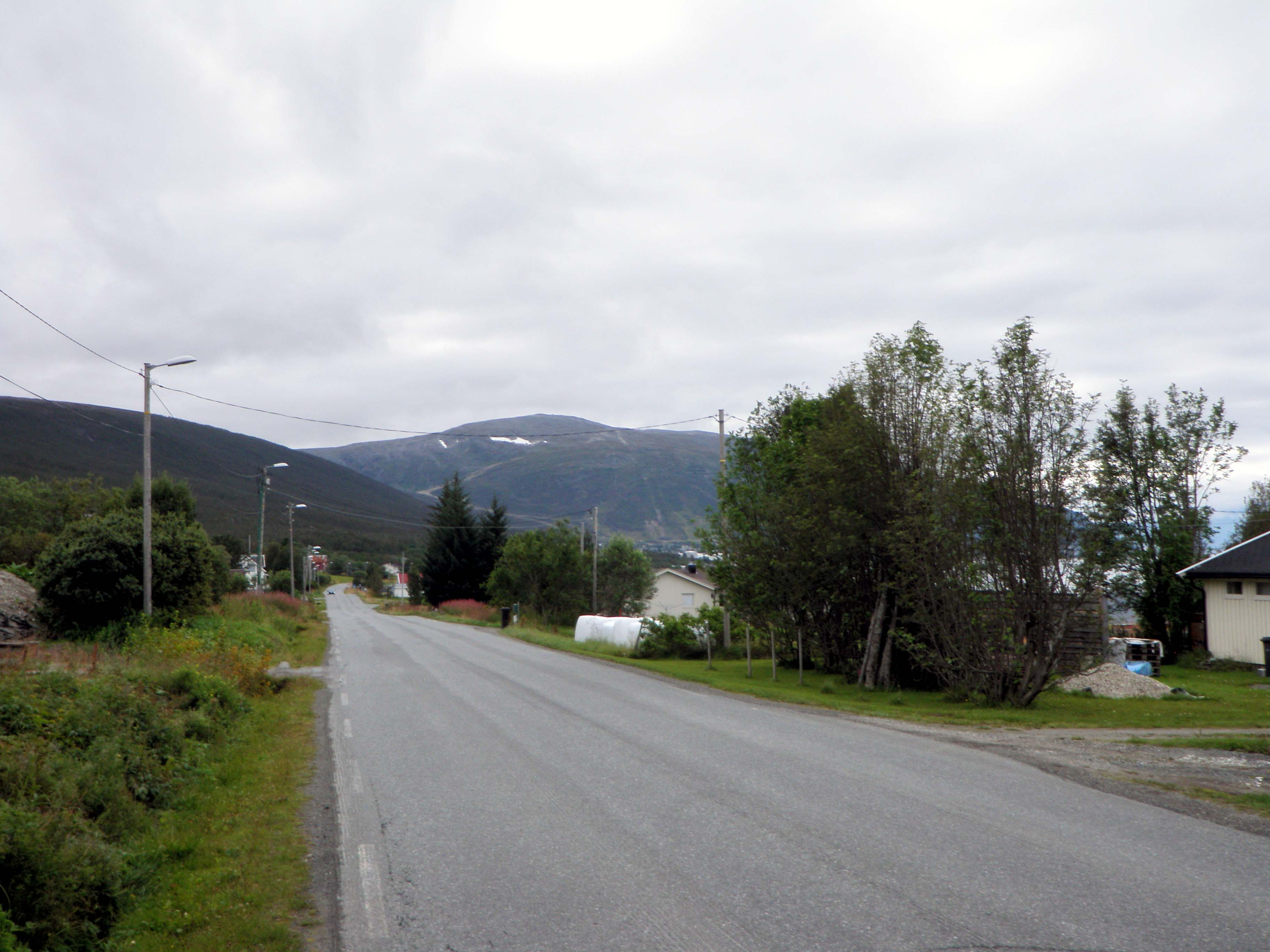
- View of the village
- Interactive map of Movik
- Location within Troms Location within Norway
- Coordinates: 69°42′41″N 19°05′34″E
- Country: Norway
- Region: Northern Norway
- County: Troms
- District: Midt-Troms
- Municipality: Tromsø Municipality

Area
  - Total: 0.23 km^{2} (0.089 sq mi)
- Elevation: 6 m (20 ft)

Population (2023)
  - Total: 382
  - Density: 1,661/km^{2} (4,300/sq mi)
- Time zone: UTC+01:00 (CET)
  - Summer (DST): UTC+02:00 (CEST)
- Post Code: 9022 Krokelvdalen

Movik is a village in Tromsø Municipality in Troms county, Norway. It is located along the Tromsøysundet strait on the mainland part of the municipality. The village sits about 10 kilometres (6.2 mi) northeast of the city of Tromsø and about 3.3 kilometres (2.1 mi) north of the village of Kroken. The 0.23-square-kilometre (57-acre) village has a population (2023) of 382 and a population density of 1,661 inhabitants per square kilometre (4,300/sq mi).
