= Tiller IL =

Norwegian sports club

- Full name: Tiller Idrettslag
- Nickname(s): The Blues
- Founded: 15 January 1916; 109 years ago
- Ground: Tonstad kunstgress, Trondheim
- Capacity: 3 000 (400 seats)
- Chairman: Lillian Engen
- Manager: Marius Lundhaug Larsen
- League: 3. divisjon
- 2024: 3. divisjon group 4, 7th of 14
Home colours

Tiller Idrettslag is a Norwegian sports club from Trondheim, Sør-Trøndelag. It has sections for association football, team handball, ice hockey, Nordic skiing and biathlon.

It was established on 15 January 1916.

== Football team ==
The men's football team have generally played in the 3. divisjon since 1997, with the exception of 2000 and 2011 when they played in the 2. divisjon. In 2008 Tiller won their 3. divisjon group and contested a playoff to win promotion to the 2. divisjon again, but lost to Nardo FK. Tiller also won their 3. divisjon group in 2010 and won 6–4 on aggregate against IL Stjørdals-Blink in the playoff and won promotion.

After the 2012 season, the football first teams of Melhus IL and Tiller IL started a cooperative team, and the team won promotion to the 2. divisjon in the 2013 season. Ahead of the 2014 season, the cooperation evolved into an own club which was named Rødde FK. and had its location in Melhus, 20 minutes outside Tiller and Trondheim.

However, not everyone was happy with the decision. In 2013 Tiller IL's third team in 6. divisjon was taken over by their first team goalkeeper at the time, and their target was to achieve promotion to the 5. divisjon by the end of the year. They won the league and achieved promotion to the 6th tier of Norwegian football where they in 2014 started as a first team of the club.

The first team has been under leadership of Marius Lundhaug Larsen (manager), Christer Berge Mathissen (assistant manager) and Geir Øyvind Sjømæling (coach) since 2013, and although the Club started the new season in 5. divisjon with two straight defeats, they went on and won the league and a second promotion in as many years.

In 2015 Tiller IL will be in 4. divisjon, only one tier away from the separation in 2013, with several players returning to the club in blue to make their dream of playing in 3. divisjon again to a reality.

=== Recent history ===
Season		Pos.	Pl.	W	D	L	GS	GA	P	Cup	Notes
2009	3. divisjon	3	22	15	1	6	68	36	46	First round	
2010	3. divisjon	↑ 1	22	15	2	5	60	35	47	Second qualifying round	Promoted to the 2. divisjon
2011	2. divisjon	↓ 12	26	8	3	15	41	58	27	Third round	Relegated the 3. divisjon
2012	3. divisjon	4	24	14	5	5	76	44	47	First round	
2013	3. divisjon	↑ 1	26	18	5	3	73	39	59	Second round	Cooperation team promoted the 2. divisjon, license taken over by Rødde FK
2013	6. divisjon	↑ 1	18	15	1	2	89	22	46		Promoted the 5. divisjon
2014	5. divisjon	↑ 1	14	11	1	2	63	19	34		Promoted the 4. divisjon
