= Ullsfjord Church =

- Ullsfjord kirke
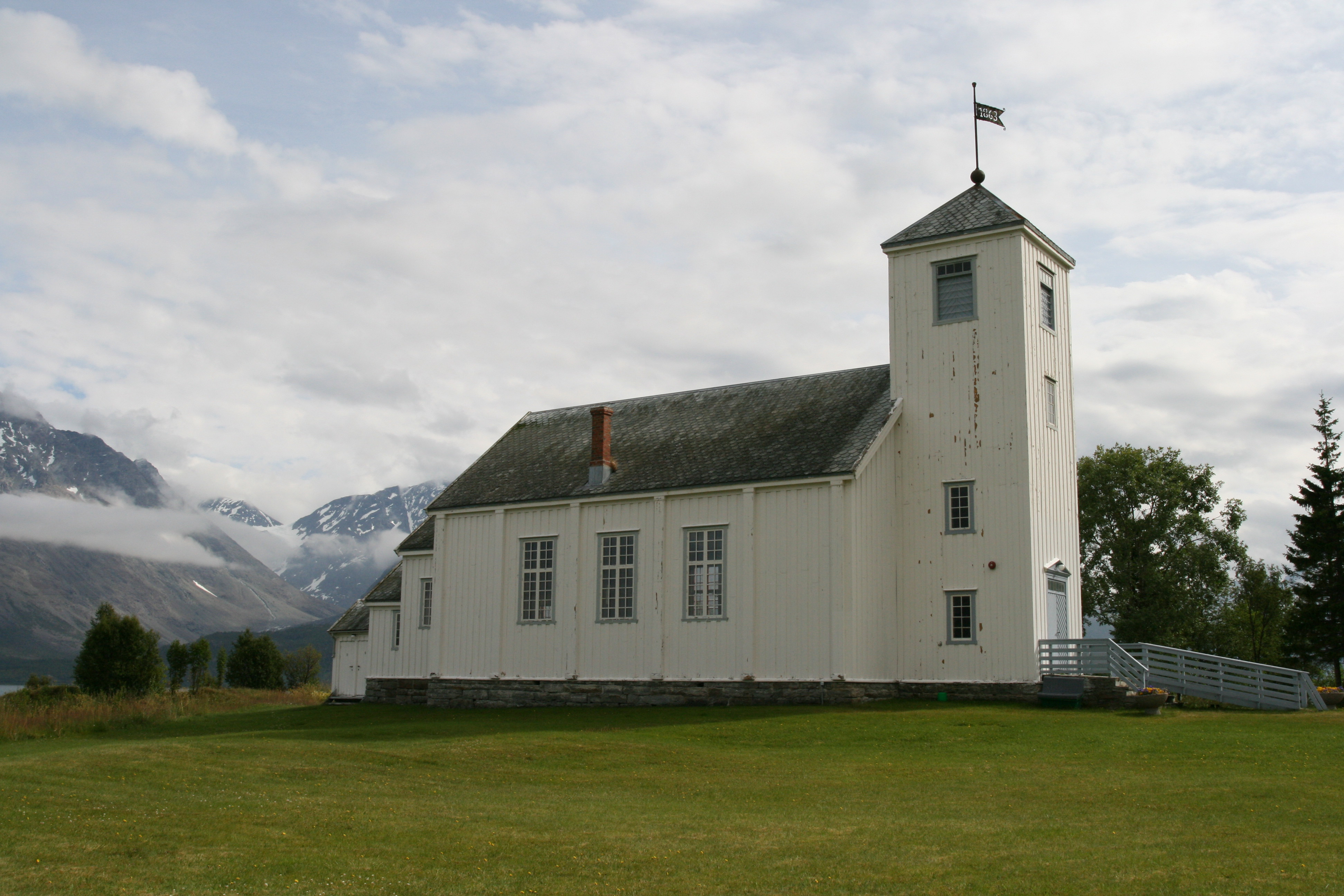
- View of the church
- Ullsfjord Church
- 69.532628°N 19.641133°E
- Location: Tromsø Municipality, Troms
- Country: Norway
- Denomination: Church of Norway
- Churchmanship: Evangelical Lutheran

History
- Former name: Sjursnes kirke
- Status: Parish church
- Founded: 1862
- Consecrated: 1862

Architecture
- Functional status: Active
- Architect: Christian Heinrich Grosch
- Architectural type: Long church
- Completed: 1862 (164 years ago)

Specifications
- Capacity: 300
- Materials: Wood

Administration
- Diocese: Nord-Hålogaland
- Deanery: Tromsø domprosti
- Parish: Ullsfjord
- Norwegian Cultural Heritage Site
- Type: Church
- Status: Not protected
- ID: 85719

Ullsfjord Church (Norwegian: Ullsfjord kirke) is a parish church of the Church of Norway in Tromsø Municipality in Troms county, Norway. It is located in the village of Sjursnes on the eastern shore of the Ullsfjorden. It is the main church for the Ullsfjord parish which is part of the Tromsø domprosti (arch-deanery) in the Diocese of Nord-Hålogaland. The white, wooden church was built in a long church style in 1862 by the architect Christian Heinrich Grosch. The church seats about 300 people.

== See also ==
- List of churches in Nord-Hålogaland
