= Kroken, Troms =

Village in Tromsø Municipality, Norway

Kroken, Troms: Kroken (Norwegian); Biežavággi (Northern Sami)
- Neighborhood of Tromsø
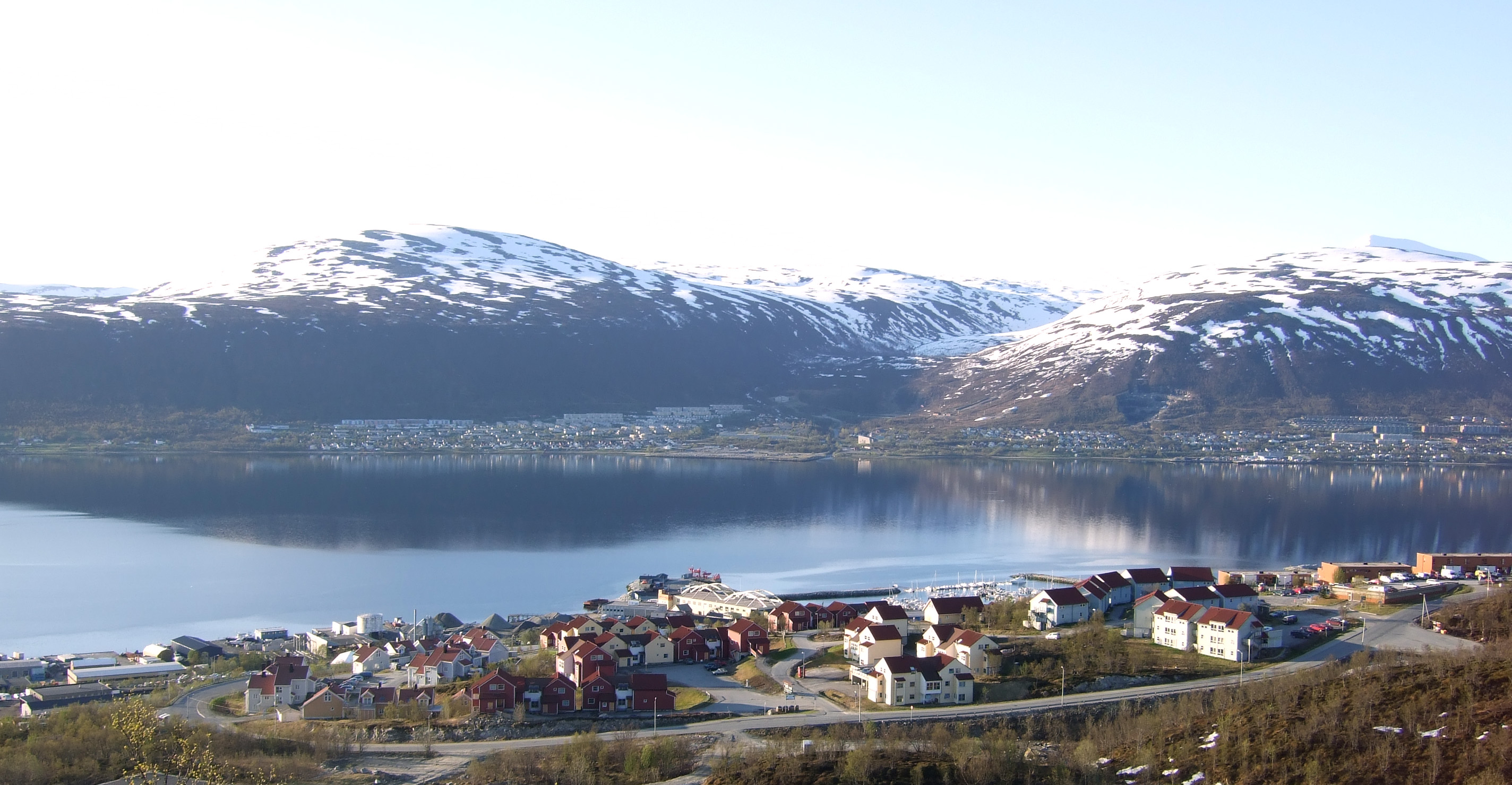
- View of the village (seen from Tromsøya)
- Interactive map of Kroken, Troms
- Location within Troms Location within Norway
- Coordinates: 69°41′02″N 19°04′10″E
- Country: Norway
- Region: Northern Norway
- County: Troms
- District: Midt-Troms
- Municipality: Tromsø Municipality
- Elevation: 19 m (62 ft)
- Time zone: UTC+01:00 (CET)
  - Summer (DST): UTC+02:00 (CEST)
- Post Code: 9022 Krokelvdalen

Kroken (Norwegian) or Biežavággi (Northern Sami) is a neighborhood in the city of Tromsø which lies in Tromsø Municipality in Troms county, Norway. The neighborhood is located along the Tromsøysundet strait on the mainland, just across the strait from the city centre of Tromsø which lies on the island of Tromsøya. The Tromsdalen area of the city of Tromsø lies about 4 kilometres (2.5 mi) to the south and the village of Movik lies about 3 kilometres (1.9 mi) to the north. The village is considered part of the Tromsdalen urban area.

Kroken is a large residential area that has two schools, Kroken Church, the Ishavsbyen FK association football club, and the Krokensenteret shopping mall, where Norway's largest Coop Prix used to be located, but got changed to a coop extra.
