= Lakselvbukt Church =

- Lakselvbukt kirke
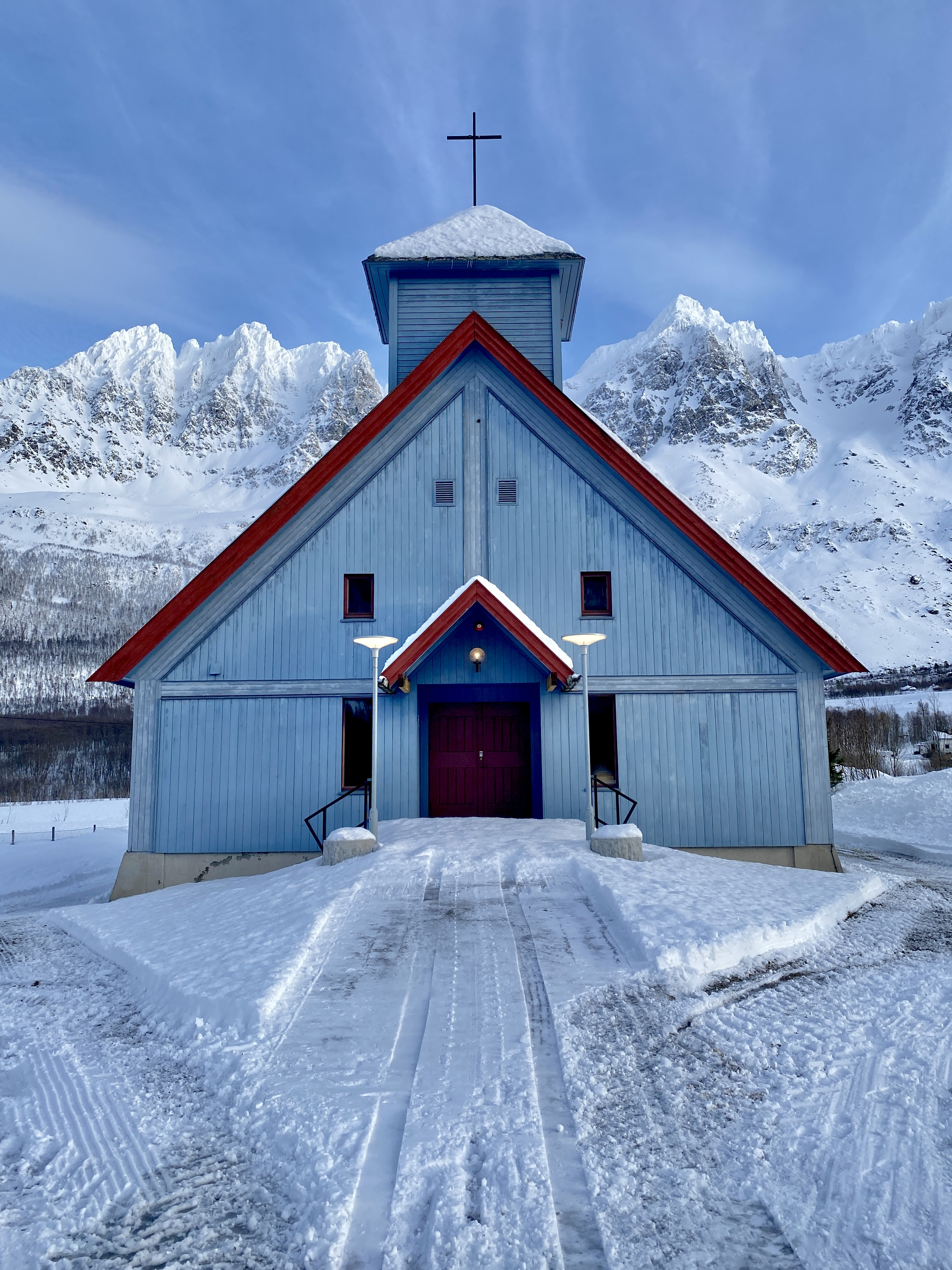
- View of the church in Winter
- Lakselvbukt Church
- 69.412020°N 19.650182°E
- Location: Tromsø Municipality, Troms
- Country: Norway
- Denomination: Church of Norway
- Churchmanship: Evangelical Lutheran

History
- Status: Parish church
- Founded: 1983
- Consecrated: 1983

Architecture
- Functional status: Active
- Architect: Harry Gangvik
- Architectural type: Long church
- Completed: 1983 (43 years ago)

Specifications
- Capacity: 250
- Materials: Wood

Administration
- Diocese: Nord-Hålogaland
- Deanery: Tromsø domprosti
- Parish: Ullsfjord
- Norwegian Cultural Heritage Site
- Type: Church
- Status: Not protected
- ID: 84886

Lakselvbukt Church (Norwegian: Lakselvbukt kirke) is a parish church of the Church of Norway in Tromsø Municipality in Troms county, Norway. It is located in the village of Lakselvbukt on the southeastern shore of the inner Ullsfjorden. It is one of the churches for the Ullsfjord parish which is part of the Tromsø domprosti (arch-deanery) in the Diocese of Nord-Hålogaland. The blue and red, wooden church was built in a long church style in 1983 using plans drawn up by the architect Harry Gangvik. The church seats about 250 people.

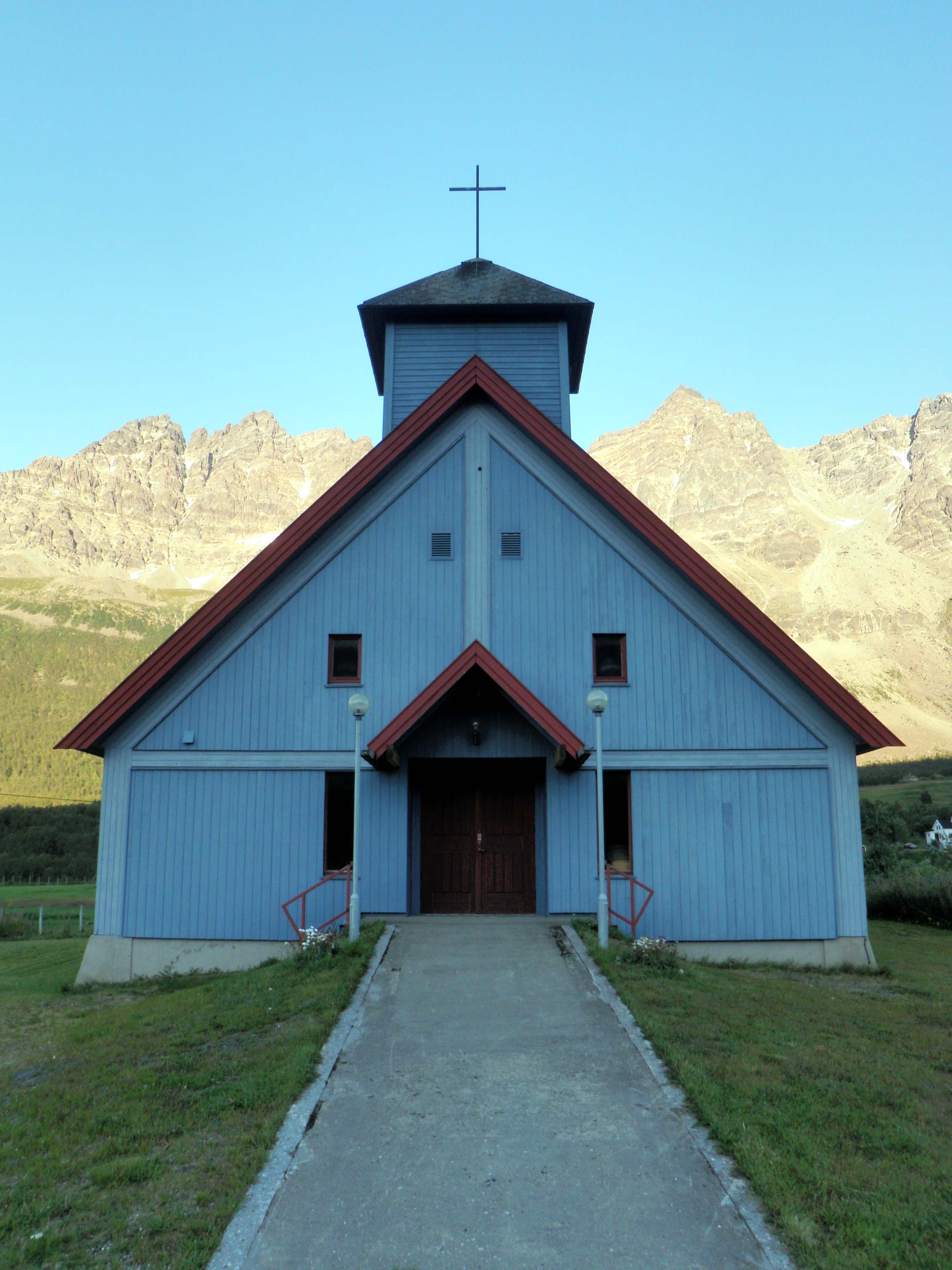
Front of the Church 2014

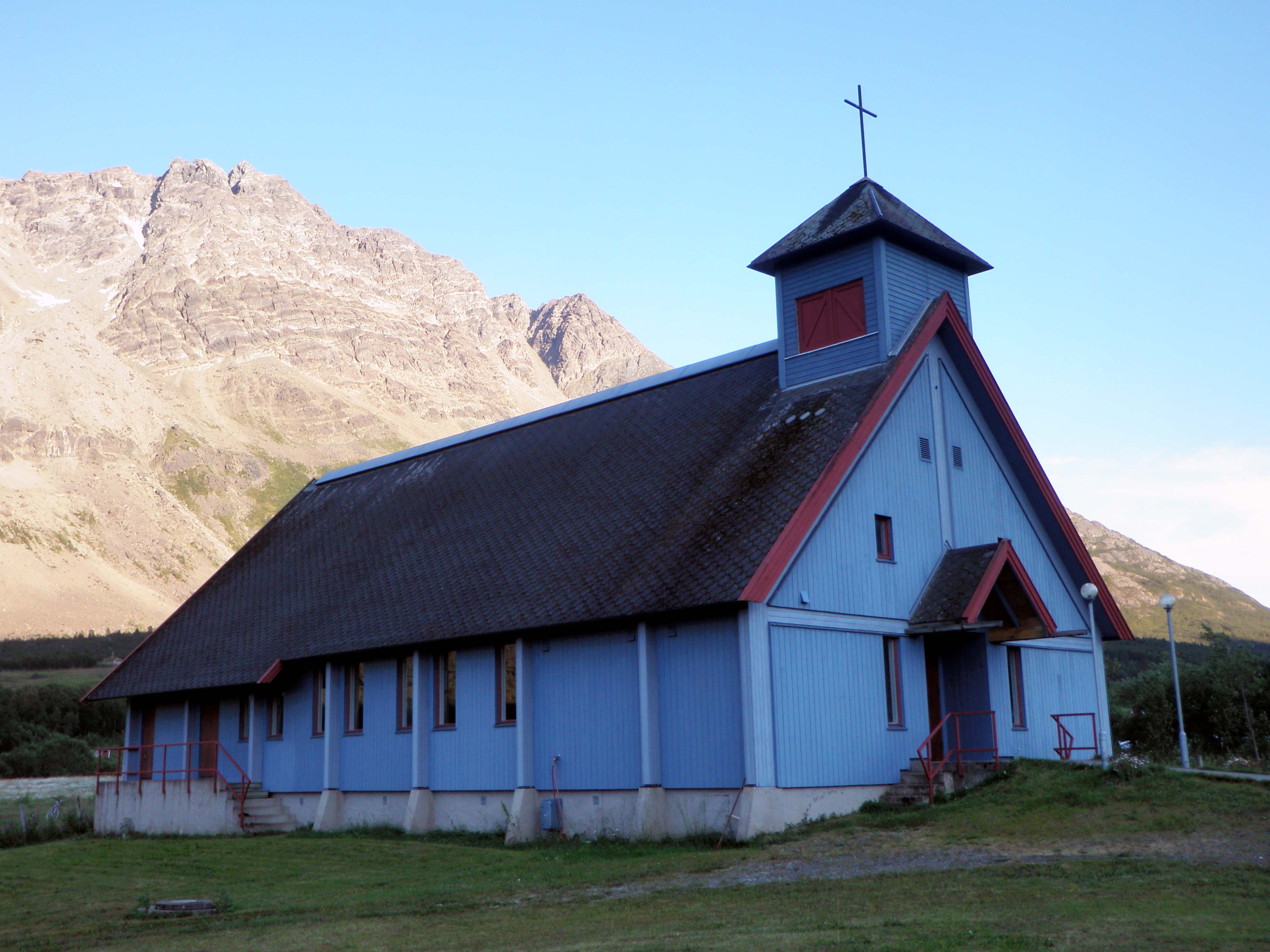
Side view of the Church 2014

== See also ==
- List of churches in Nord-Hålogaland
