= Lakselvbukt =

Village in Tromsø Municipality, Norway

Lakselvbukt: Lakselvbukt (Norwegian); Moskaluokta (Northern Sami)
- Village
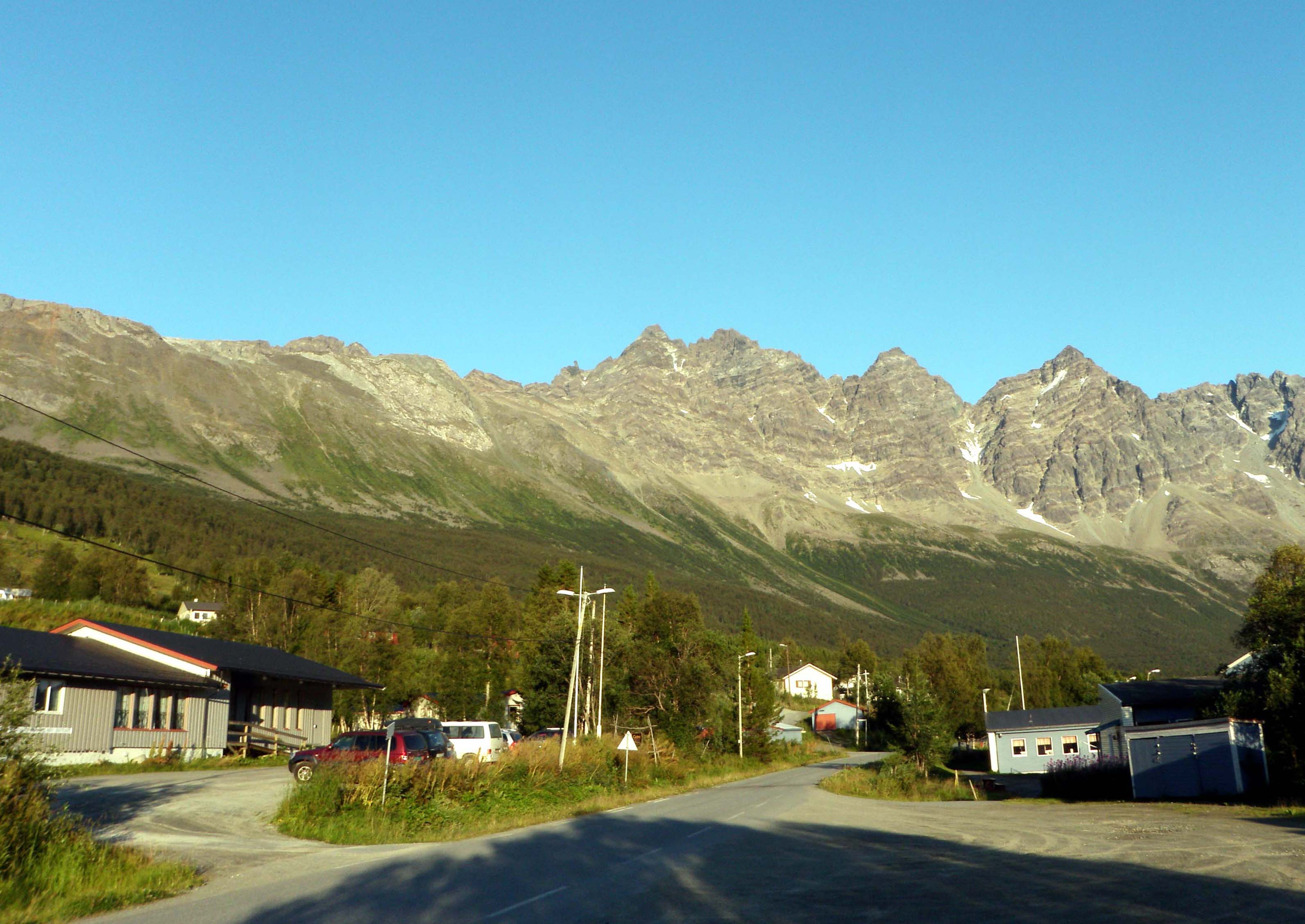
- View of the village
- Interactive map of Lakselvbukt
- Location within Troms Location within Norway
- Coordinates: 69.4333°N 19.6470°E
- Country: Norway
- Region: Northern Norway
- County: Troms
- District: Midt-Troms
- Municipality: Tromsø Municipality
- Elevation: 11 m (36 ft)
- Time zone: UTC+01:00 (CET)
  - Summer (DST): UTC+02:00 (CEST)
- Post Code: 9042 Laksvatn

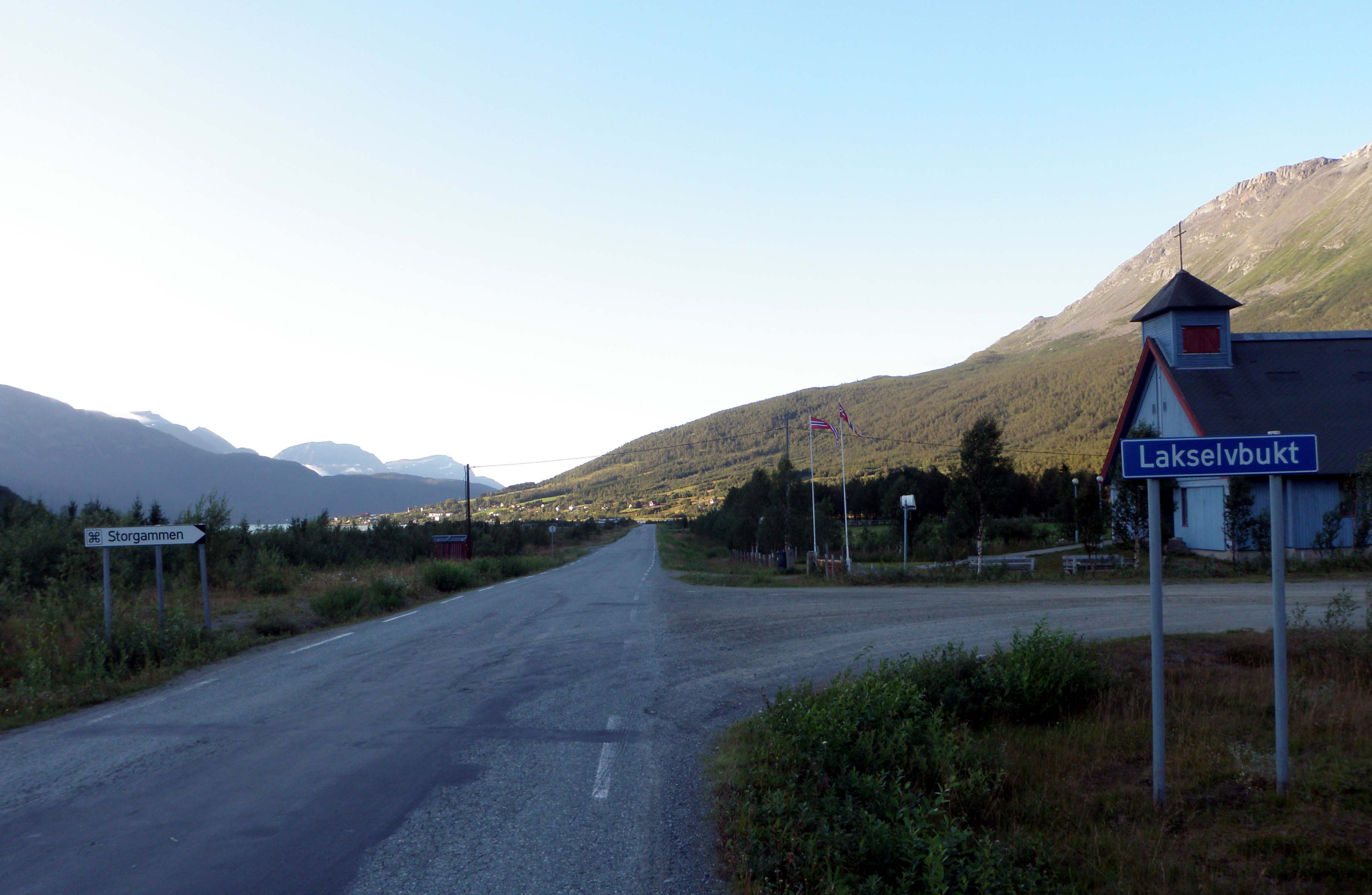
Lakselvbukt Church lies on the outskirts of Lakselvbukt

Lakselvbukt (Norwegian) or Moskaluokta (Northern Sami) is a village in Tromsø Municipality in Troms county, Norway. The village is located on the inner part of the Ullsfjorden. The village lies about 16 kilometres (9.9 mi) northeast of the village of Laksvatn (in neighboring Balsfjord Municipality) and the European route E8 highway.

The village lies along the western edge of the Lyngen Alps, about 75 kilometres (47 mi) from the city of Tromsø. Lakselvbukt Church is located in the village.

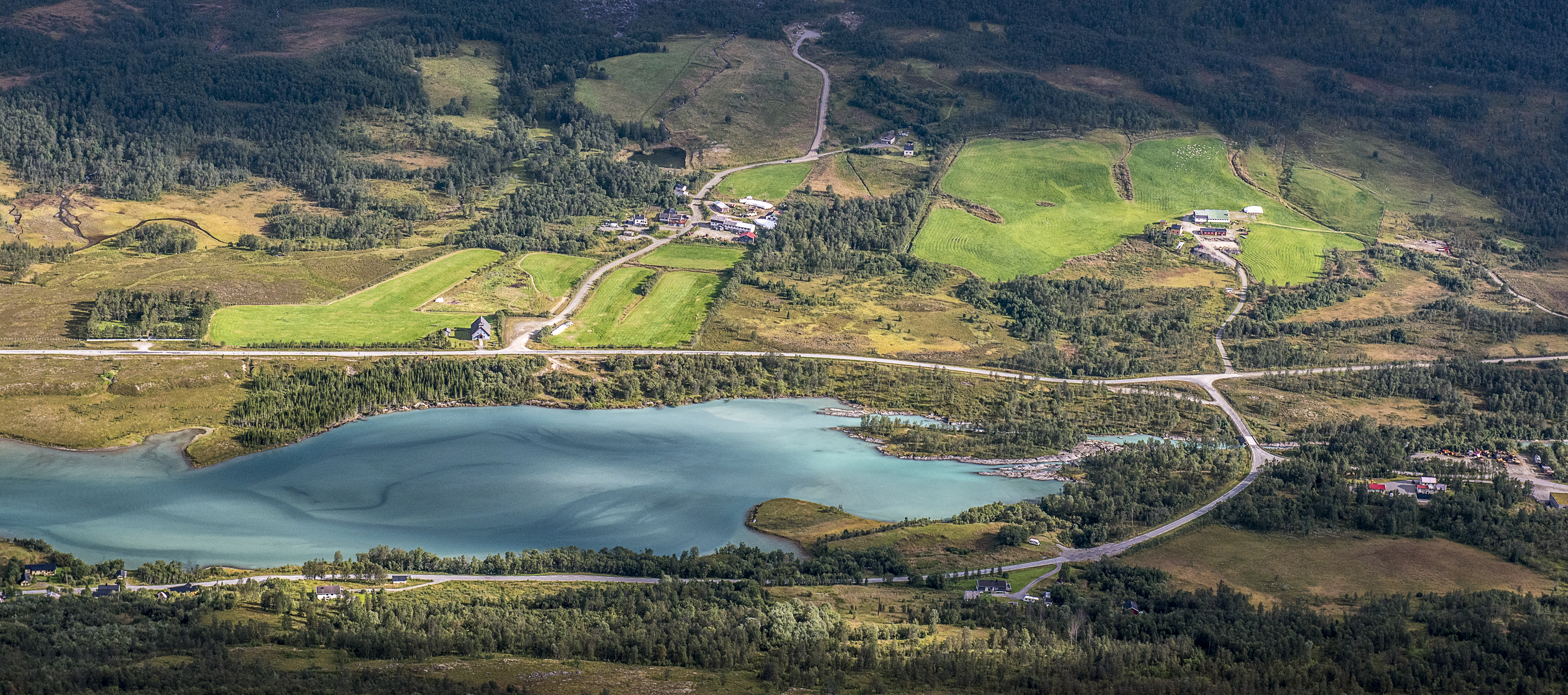
The Lakselvbukt Church area

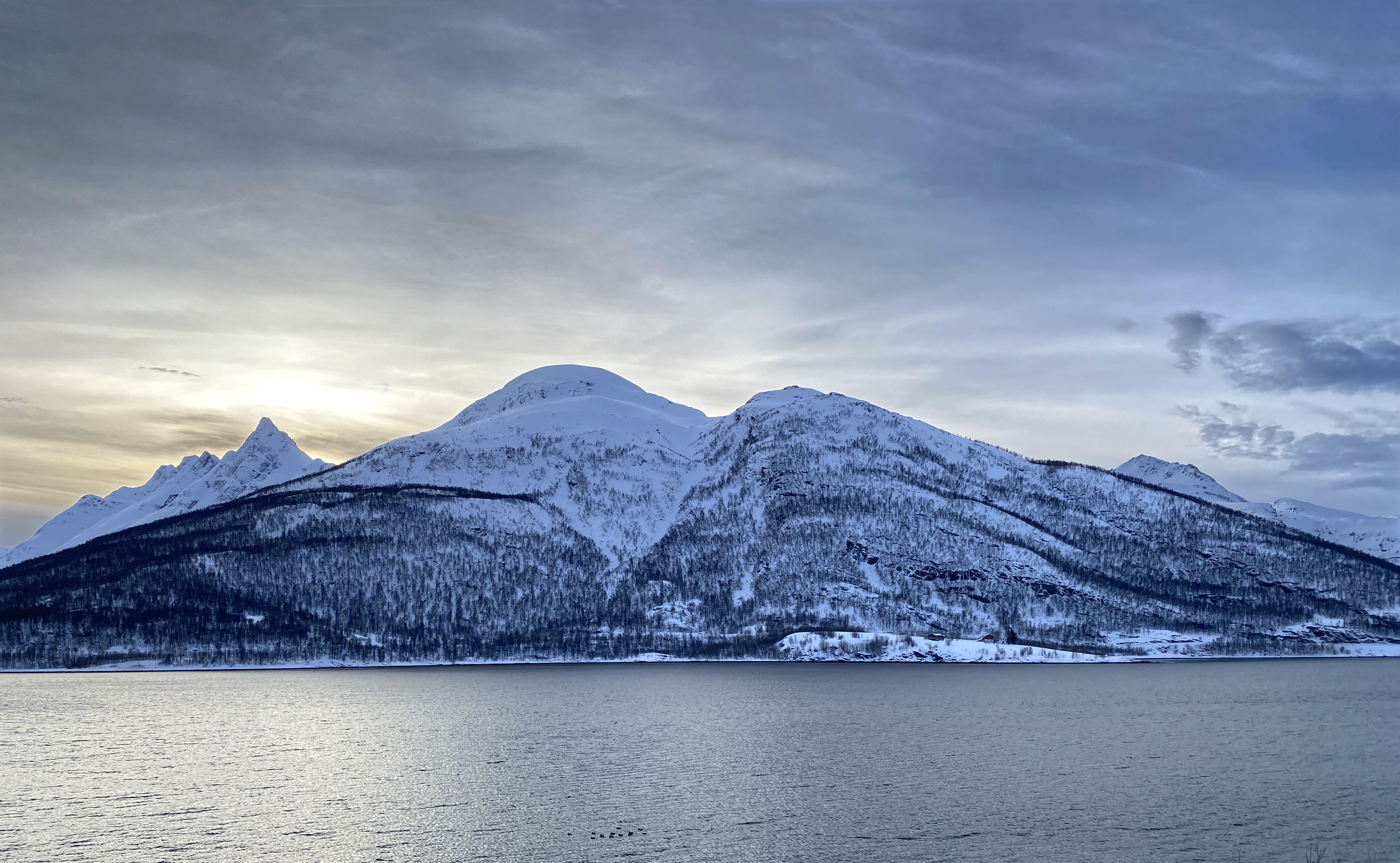
The "Lakselvtindane" mountains in the background

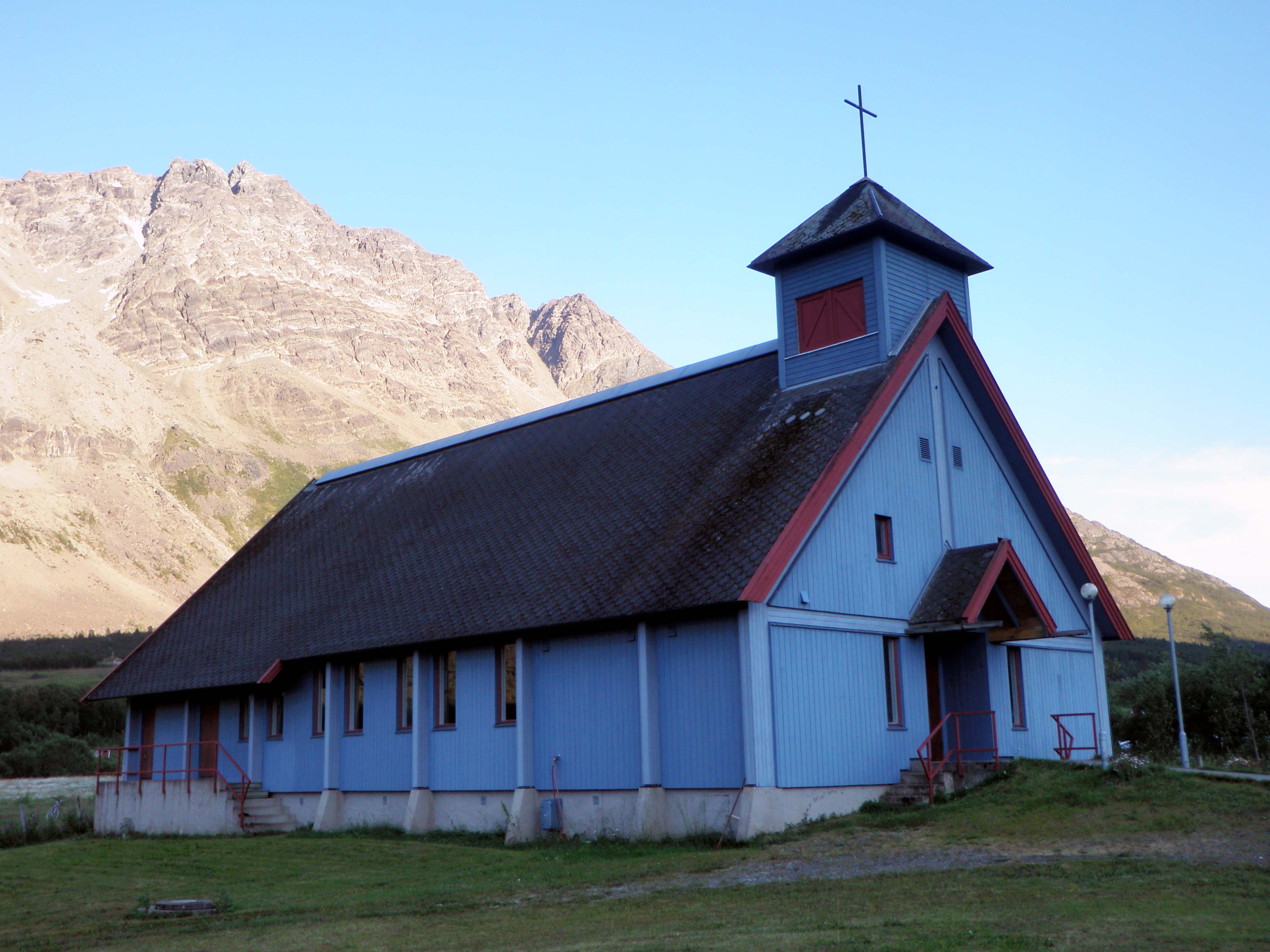
Lakselvbukt Church

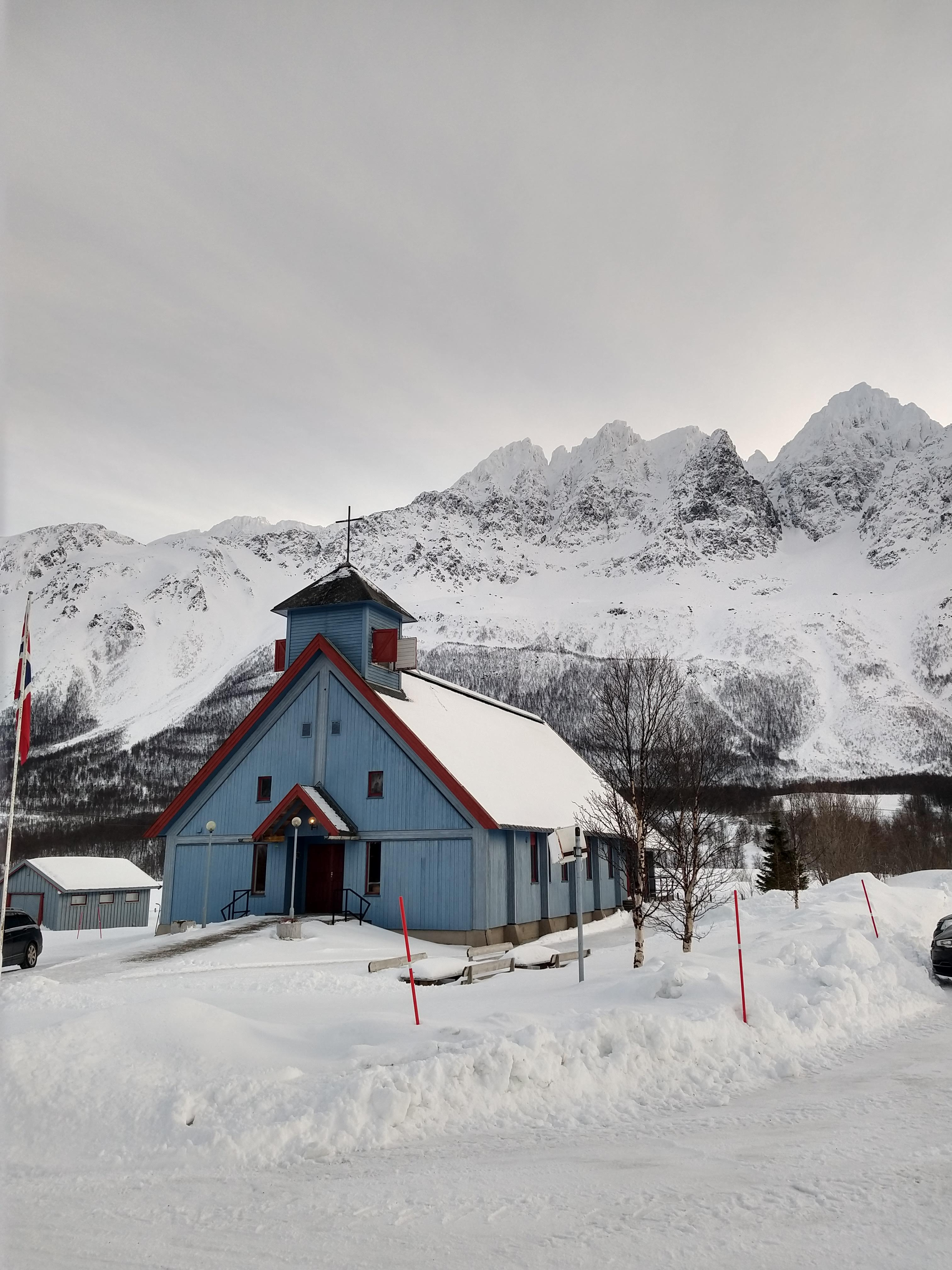
View of church in snow

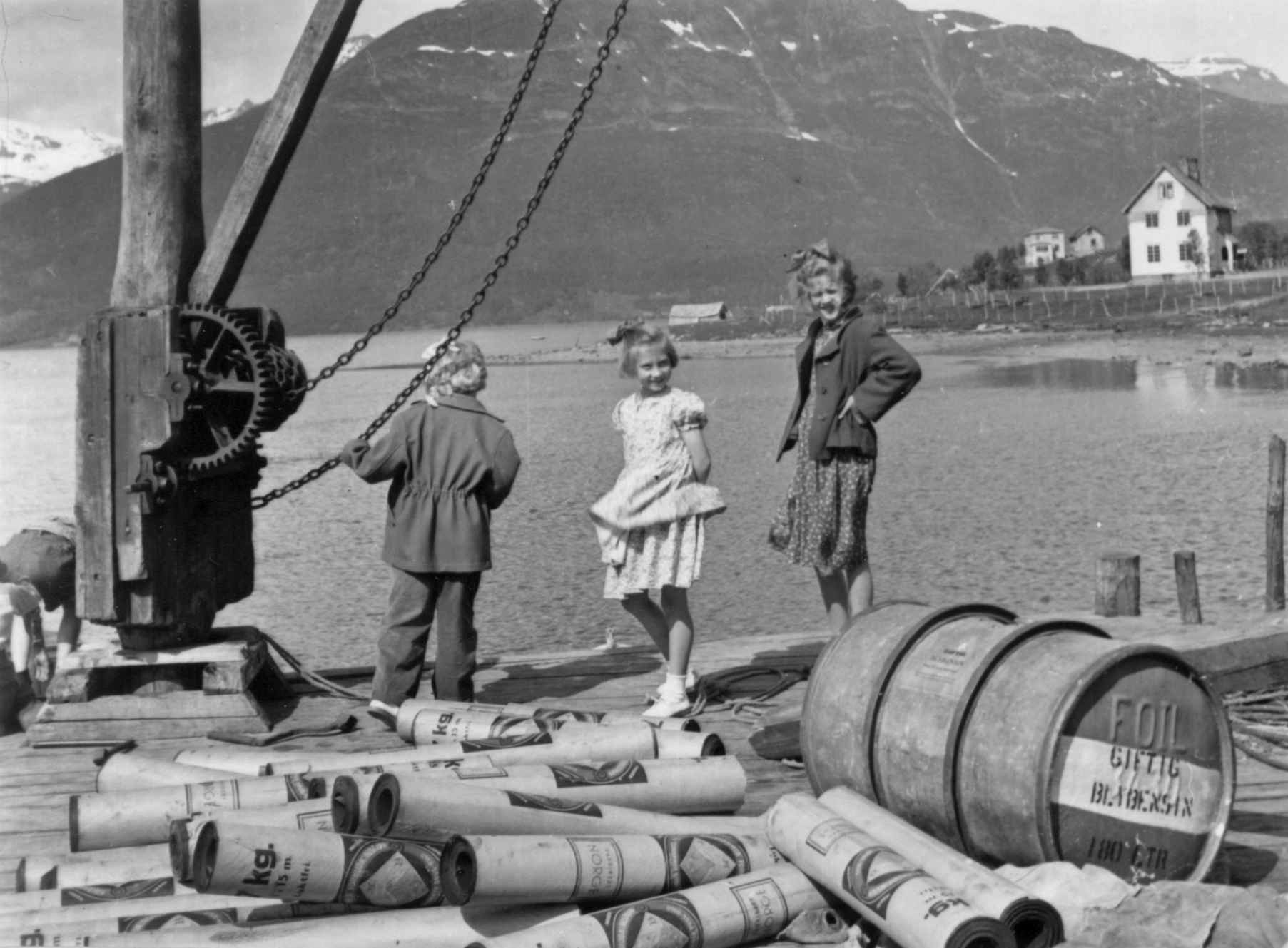
People on the dock

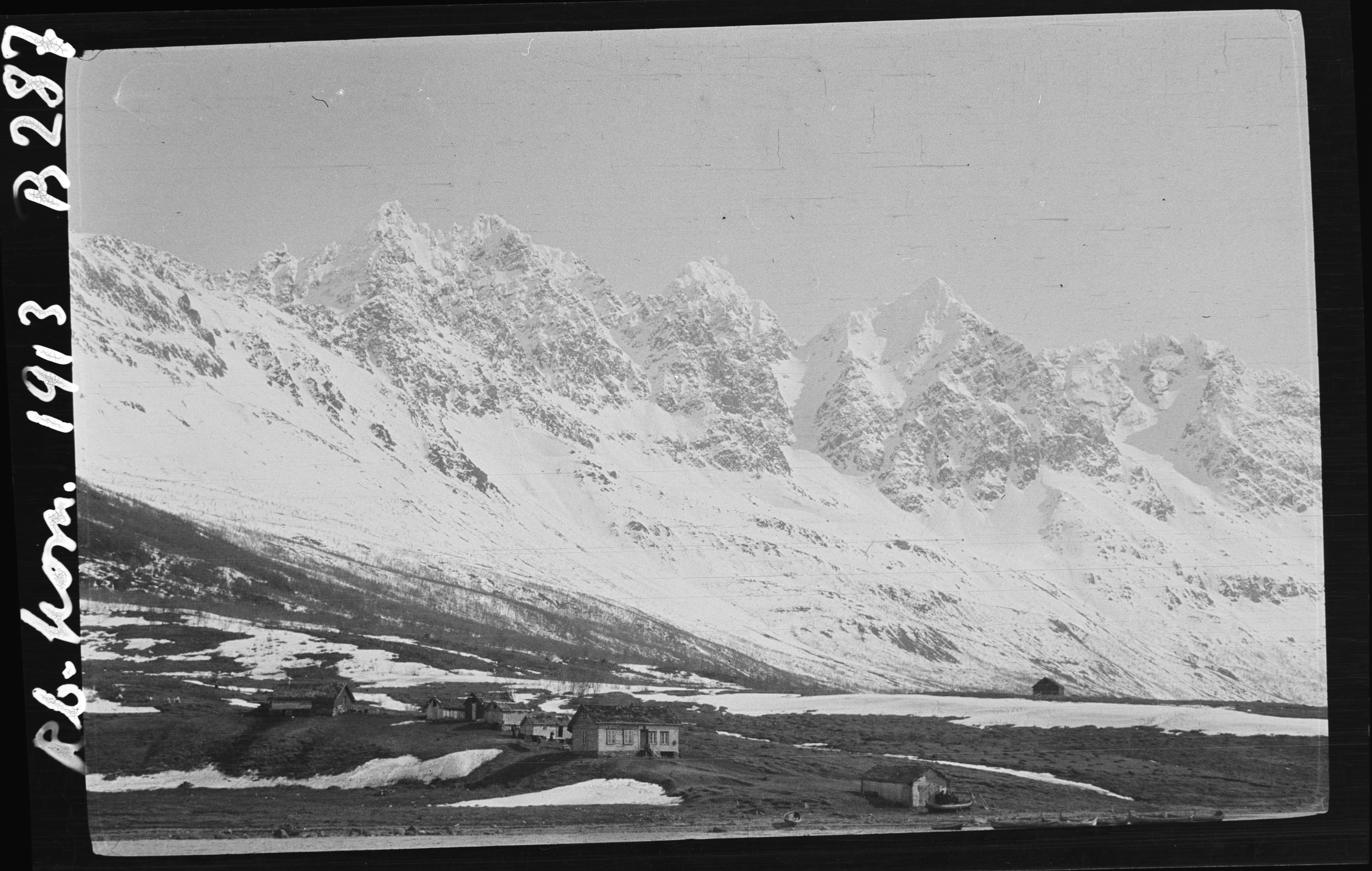
Surrounding mountains
