= Kaldfjorden =

Kaldfjorden or Kaldfjord (lit. 'the cold fjord') may refer to:

== Places ==
- Kaldfjord, a village in Tromsø Municipality, Troms county, Norway
- Kaldfjorden, Troms, a fjord in the island of Kvaløya in Tromsø Municipality, Troms county, Norway
- Kaldfjorden, the name of the central part of the large lake Sandvatnet/Kaldfjorden/Øyvatnet in Innlandet county, Norway
- Kaldfjorden, Finnmark, a fjord in Nordkapp Municipality in Finnmark county, Norway
