= Tromsø =

Town in Tromsø Municipality, Norway

Tromsø: Tromsø (Norwegian); Romsa (Northern Sami); Tromssa (Kven)
- City
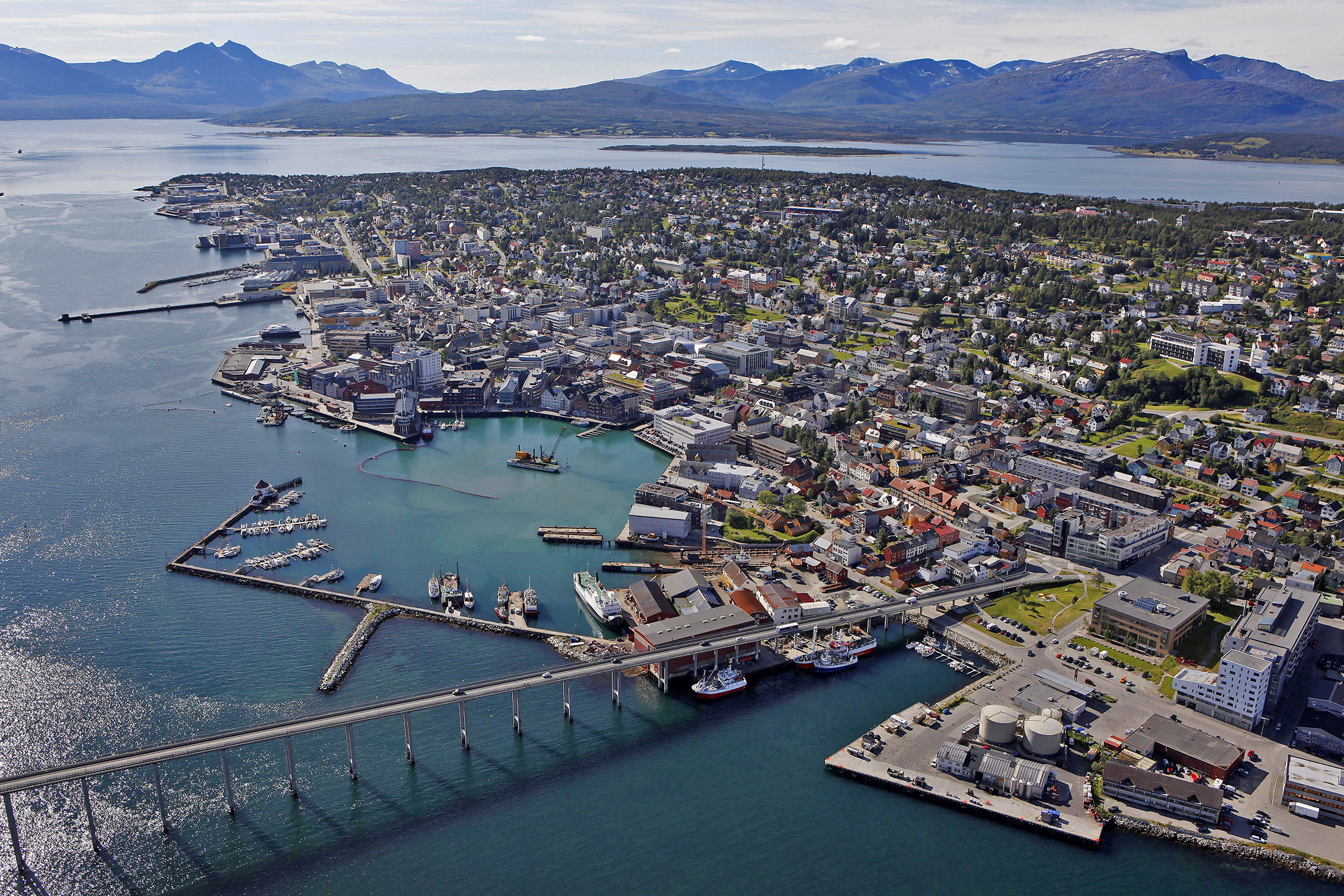
- View of the city
- Interactive map of Tromsø
- Location within Troms Location within Norway
- Coordinates: 69°39′06″N 18°57′20″E
- Country: Norway
- Region: Northern Norway
- County: Troms
- District: Midt-Troms
- Municipality: Tromsø Municipality
- Established as
- Kjøpstad: 1794

Area
  - Total: 13.8 km^{2} (5.3 sq mi)
- Elevation: 5 m (16 ft)

Population (2026)
  - Total: 80,114
  - Density: 3,100/km^{2} (8,000/sq mi)
- Time zone: UTC+01:00 (CET)
  - Summer (DST): UTC+02:00 (CEST)
- Post Code: 9008 Tromsø

Tromsø is a city in Tromsø Municipality in Troms county, Norway. The city is the administrative centre of the municipality and the county. The city is located on the island of Tromsøya which sits in the Tromsøysundet strait, just off the mainland of Northern Norway. The mainland suburb of Tromsdalen is connected to the city centre on Tromsøya by the Tromsø Bridge and the Tromsøysund Tunnel. The suburb of Kvaløysletta on the island of Kvaløya is connected to the city centre by the Sandnessund Bridge.

The city centre contains the highest number of old wooden houses in Northern Norway, the oldest dating from 1789. Tromsø is a cultural hub for the region, with several festivals taking place in the summer.

The 13.8-square-kilometre (3,400-acre) town has a population (2024) of 42,782 and a population density of 3,100 inhabitants per square kilometre (8,000/sq mi).

In 2026, Tromsø holds the title of European Youth Capital, becoming the northernmost city to ever receive this designation. The year-long programme focuses on empowering young people in the Arctic region and fostering youth participation in local governance.

== Names and etymology ==
The city of Tromsø is named after the island of Tromsøya, on which it stands. The last element of the city's name comes from "island" (Norwegian: øy, Danish: ø), but the etymology of the first element is uncertain. Several theories exist. One theory holds "Troms-" is derived from the old (uncompounded) name of the island (Old Norse: Trums). Several islands and rivers in Norway have the name Tromsa, and the names of these are probably derived from the word straumr, which means "(strong) current". (The original form must then have been Strums, for the missing s, see Indo-European s-mobile.)

The Sámi name of the island, Romsa, is assumed to be a loan from Norse; in Sámi, word-initial consonant clusters are dispreferred. However, an alternative form with the consonant cluster, Tromsa, is in informal use. A theory holds that the Norwegian name of Tromsø derives from the Sámi name, though this theory lacks an explanation for the meaning of Romsa. A common misunderstanding is that Tromsø's Sámi name is Romssa with a double "s". This, however, is the accusative and genitive form of the noun used when, for example, writing "Tromsø Municipality" (Romssa suohkan). In Finnish, however, the word is written with a double "s": Tromssa.

== History ==
The area has been inhabited since the end of the last ice age. Archeological excavations in Tønsvika have turned up artefacts and remains of buildings estimated to be 9,000 to 10,000 years old.

=== Middle Ages: a fortress on the frontier ===
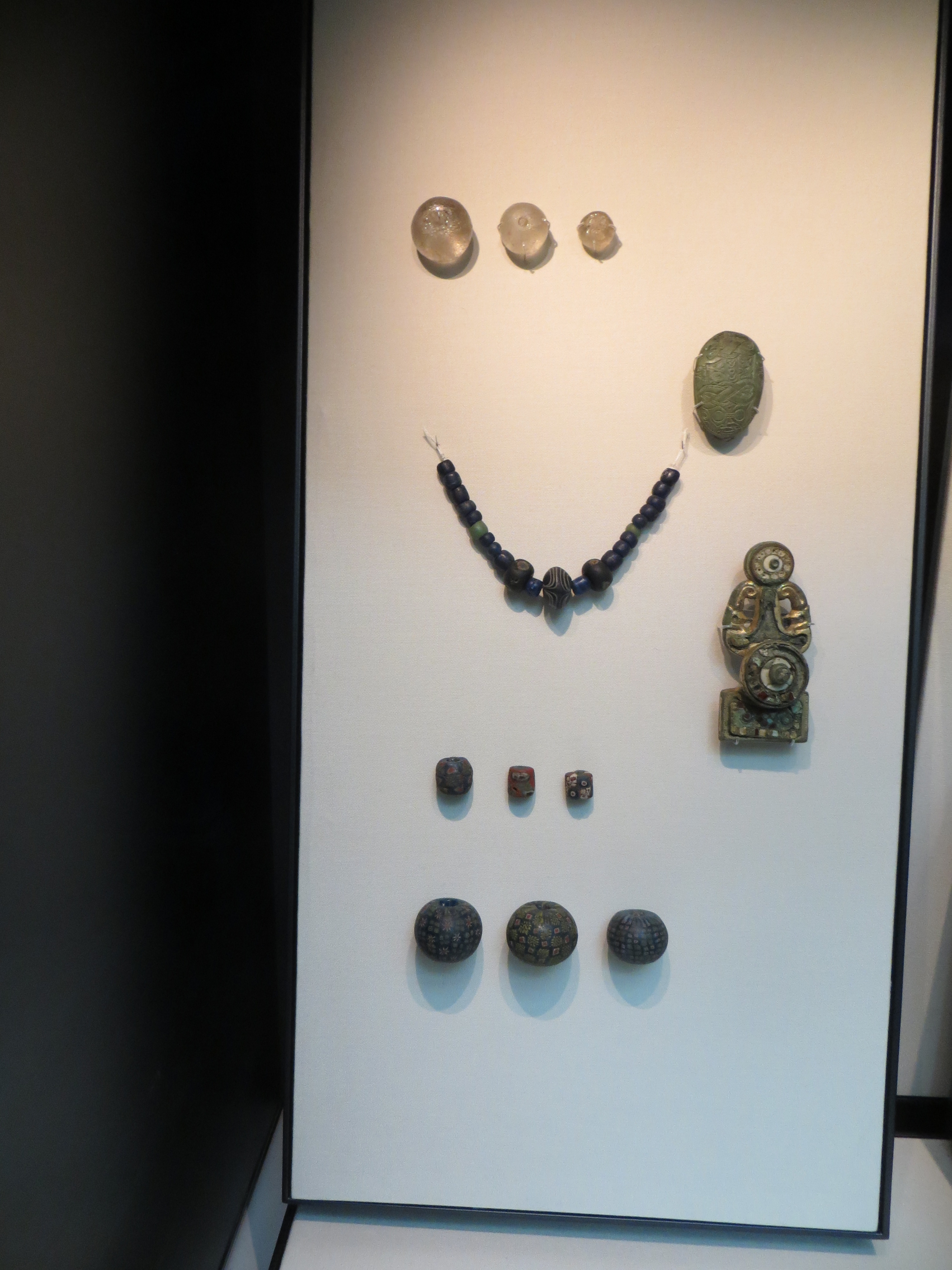
Hoard of Viking jewellery found in Tromsø dating from 7–8th centuries AD now in the British Museum

The area's rich Norse and Sámi heritage is well documented. The Norse chieftain Ohthere, who lived during the 890s, is assumed to have inhabited the southernmost reaches of today's Tromsø municipality. He described himself as living "furthest to the North of all Norwegians" with areas north of this being populated by Sámi. An Icelandic source (Rimbegla) from the 12th century also describes the fjord Malangen in the south of today's Tromsø municipality as a border between Norse and Sámi coastal settlements during that part of the Middle Ages. However, archaeological finds show that the Vikings have been present on the main island itself. In a burial/settlement near today's airport, a sword and other combat tools have been found, as well as household tools typical for the Norwegians. In addition, one of Northern Norway's largest Viking treasures is found on the island itself. There has also been extensive Sámi settlement on the coast south of this 'border' as well as scattered Norse settlements north of Malangen − for example, both Sámi and Norse Iron Age (0–1050 AD) remains have been found on southern Kvaløya.

The first church on the island of Tromsøya was erected in 1252. Ecclesia Sanctae Mariae de Trums juxta paganos ("The Church of Saint Mary in Troms near the Heathens" − the nominal "heathens" being the Sámi), was built during the reign of King Hákon Hákonarson. At the time, it was the northernmost church in the world. Around the same time a turf rampart was built to protect the area against raids from Karelia and Russia.

Skansen - a medieval fortress at least 750 years old. The fortification was strategically located on a point with a view of the shipping lanes to the north and south.

Tromsø was not just a Norwegian outpost in an area mainly populated by the Sámi, but also a frontier city towards Russia; the Novgorod state had the right to tax the Sámi along the coast to Lyngstuva and inland to the Skibotn River or possibly the Målselv River, whereas Norway was allowed to tax areas east to − and including − the Kola Peninsula. During the next five hundred years Norway's border with Russia and the limits of Norwegian settlement would be pushed eastwards to Sør-Varanger Municipality, making Tromsø lose its character as a "frontier town".

=== 1700s and 1800s: the "Paris of the north" ===
During the 17th century, while Denmark–Norway was solidifying its claim to the northern coast of Scandinavia, the redoubt Skansen was built. Despite only being home to around 80 people, Tromsø was issued its city charter on 20 June 1794 by King Christian VII. This coincided with, and was a direct consequence of, the abolition of the city of Bergen's centuries-old monopoly on the trade in cod. Tromsø quickly rose in importance. The Diocese of Hålogaland was created in 1804, with the first bishop being Mathias Bonsak Krogh. The city was established as a municipality on 1 January 1838 (see formannskapsdistrikt law).

Arctic hunting, from Novaya Zemlya to Canada, started up around 1820. By 1850, Tromsø was the major centre of Arctic hunting, overtaking the former centre of Hammerfest. Tromsø had trading contacts with both Central Europe and Russia (specifically Arkhangelsk) during this time, the latter of which resulted in the development of the pidgin language Russenorsk.

In 1848, the teacher training college was also moved from Trondenes Municipality (near current-day Harstad) to Tromsø, with part of its mission being to educate Sámi scholars − there was a quota ensuring that Sámi gained access. The teacher college was followed by the Tromsø Museum in 1872, and the Mack Brewery in 1877.

In the 19th century, Tromsø became known as the "Paris of the North". How this nickname came into being is uncertain, but the reason is generally assumed to be that people in Tromsø appeared far more sophisticated than visitors from the south typically expected.

=== Early 1900s: exploration and war ===
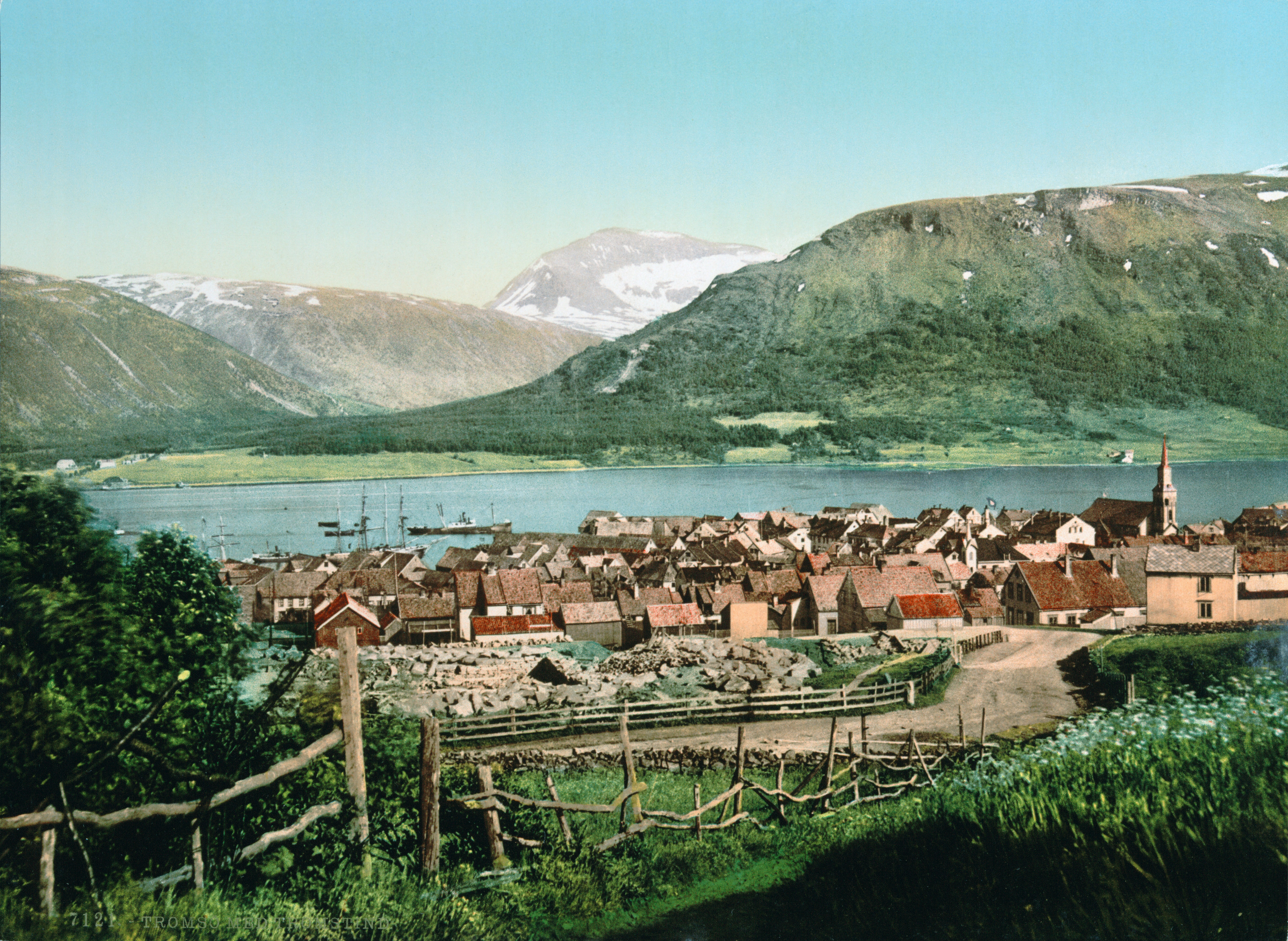
Photochrom print from Tromsø, 1900

By the end of the 19th century, Tromsø had become a major Arctic trade centre from which many Arctic expeditions originated. Explorers like Roald Amundsen, Umberto Nobile and Fridtjof Nansen made use of the know-how in Tromsø on the conditions in the Arctic, and often recruited their crews in the city. The Northern lights observatory was founded in 1927.

When Germany invaded Norway in 1940, Tromsø served briefly as the seat of the Norwegian government. General Carl Gustav Fleischer arrived in Tromsø on 10 April 1940 after flying in terrible conditions from Vadsø. From Tromsø he issued orders for total civilian and military mobilisation and declared Northern Norway a theatre of war. Fleischer's strategic plan was to first wipe out the German forces at Narvik and then transfer his division to Nordland to meet a German advance from Trøndelag. The Germans eventually captured all of Norway, after allied support had been withdrawn, although they encountered fierce resistance from the Finnmark-based Alta Battalion at Narvik. Tromsø escaped the war unscathed, although the German battleship Tirpitz was sunk by RAF bombers during Operation Catechism off the Tromsøy island on 12 November 1944, killing close to 1,000 German sailors.

The German battleship Tirpitz was bombed and sunk by the RAF off Tromsø island in 1944.

At the end of the war, the city received thousands of refugees from Finnmark county and the northern areas of Troms − areas that had been devastated by German forces using scorched earth tactics in expectation of a Red Army offensive.

=== Late 1900s – today: rapid expansion ===
Expansion after World War II has been rapid. The rural Tromsøysund Municipality and Ullsfjord Municipality, and most of Hillesøy Municipality, were merged with Tromsø on 1 January 1964, creating today's Tromsø municipality and almost tripling Tromsø's population − from 12,430 to 32,664. In addition, the population growth has been strong, with at times more than 1,000 new Tromsøværinger (residents of Tromsø) annually. The population of Tromsø municipality today is 68,239, and the urban area, Norway's ninth most populous, is home to 58,486 people. This excludes most of the city's students, however, who often do not change their address when moving to Tromsø.

A major development was the opening of Tromsø Airport in 1964, situated on the main island, and in 1972 the University of Tromsø was opened, at the time one of four universities in Norway and the only one serving the northern half of the country. A local teacher's college and museum were eventually incorporated into the university. The Norwegian Polar Institute was moved to Tromsø from Oslo in 1998. More recently, the university has expanded further through two mergers, first with University College Tromsø in 2009 and then with University College Finnmark in 2013.

== Geography ==
Tromsø is the 12th largest municipality in Norway with a population of 78,745. The city is home to the world's northernmost university and also houses the northernmost botanical garden and planetarium.

The city centre is located on the east side of the Tromsøya island − over 300 kilometres (190 mi) north of the Arctic Circle at 69°40′33″N 18°55′10″E. Suburban areas include Kroken, Tromsdalen (on the mainland, east of Tromsøya), the rest of the Tromsøya island, and the eastern part of the large Kvaløya, west of the Tromsøya island. The Tromsø Bridge and Tromsøysund Tunnel both cross the Tromsøysundet strait connecting the mainland with Tromsøya by road. On the western side of the city, the Sandnessund Bridge connects Tromsøya island with Kvaløya island.

The highest point in the municipality is the 1,830.7-metre (6,006 ft) tall mountain Jiehkkevárri. There are also many other tall mountains within the municipality including Hamperokken, Store Blåmannen, Store Fornestinden, and Tromsdalstinden. The Lyngen Alps mountain range lies along the Tromsø-Lyngen municipal border. There are many islands within the municipality of Tromsø including Hillesøya, Kvaløya, Rebbenesøya, Ringvassøya, Store Sommarøya, and Tromsøya. There are also several fjords that are located in Tromsø including the Balsfjorden, Kaldfjorden, Malangen, and Ullsfjorden.

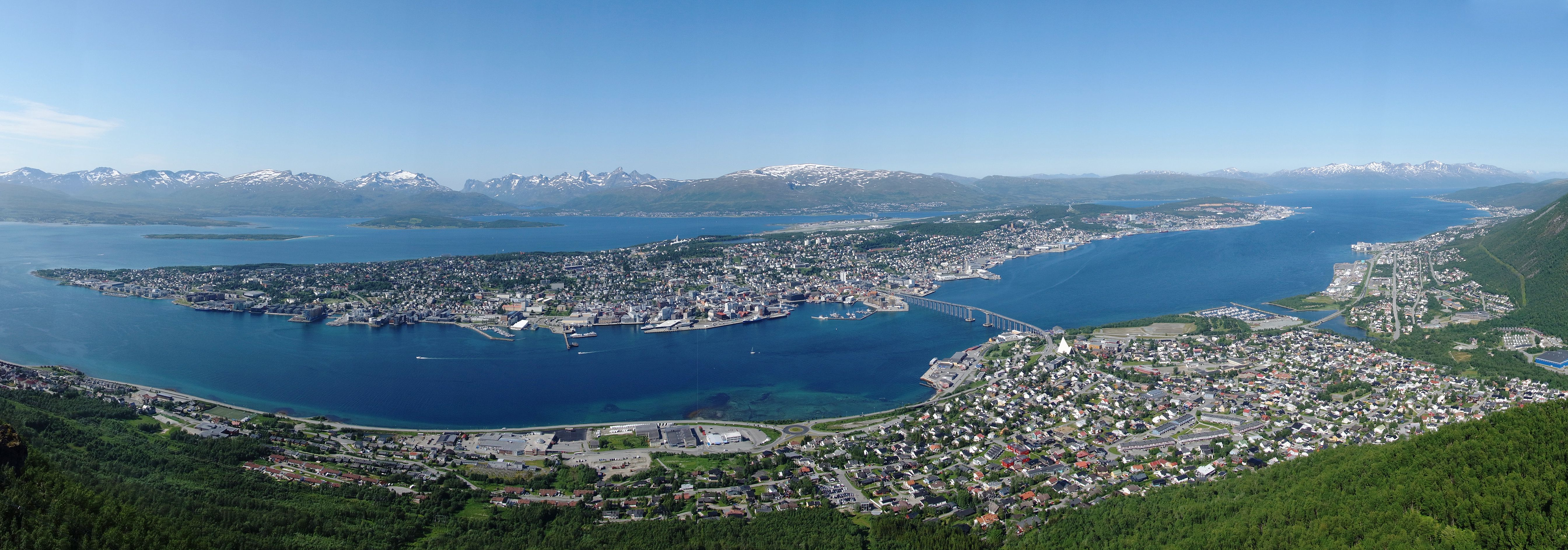
Panoramic view of Tromsø from Fløya. The Tromsø Bridge and the Arctic Cathedral can be seen in the lower-right corner.

== Climate ==
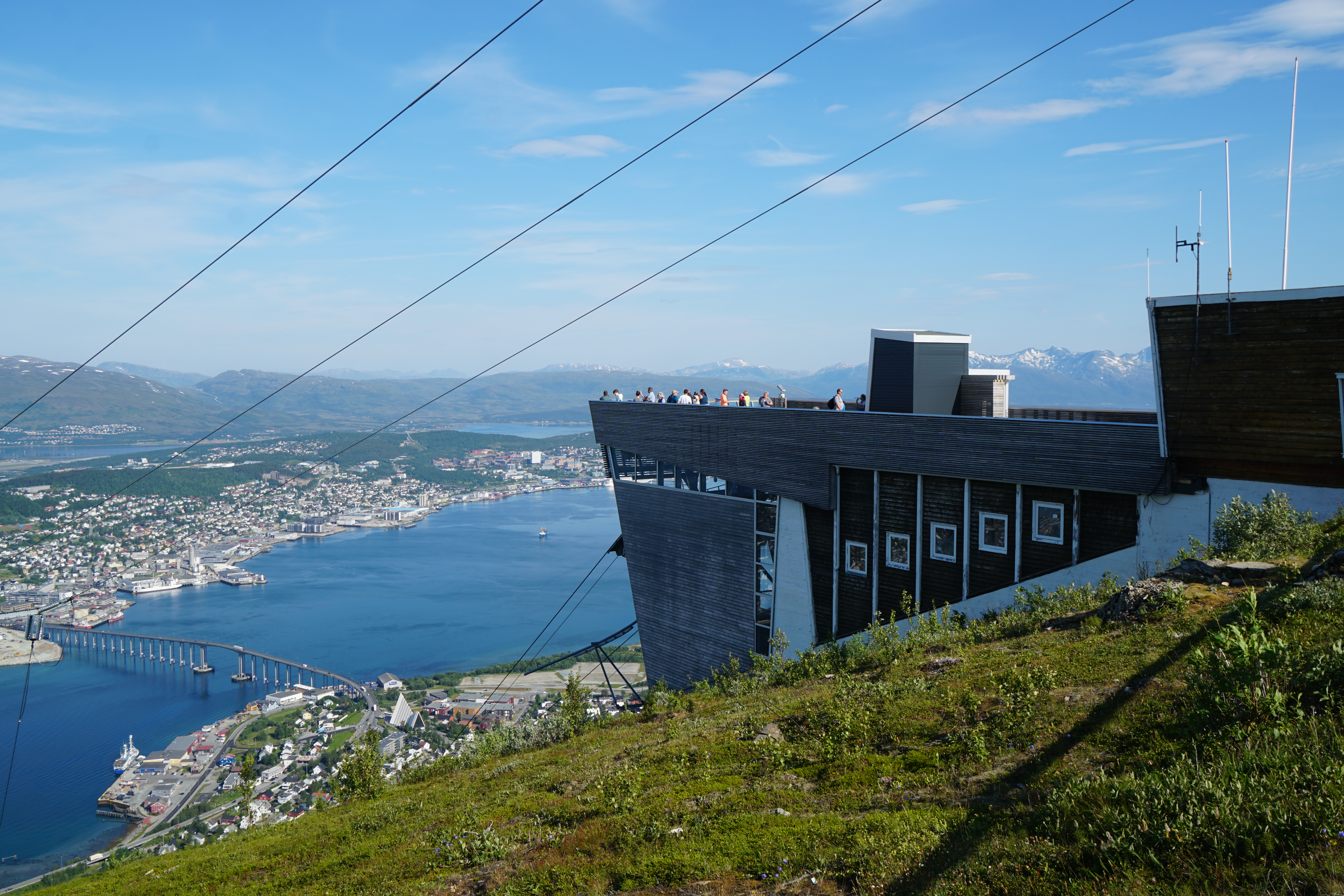
Fjellheisen

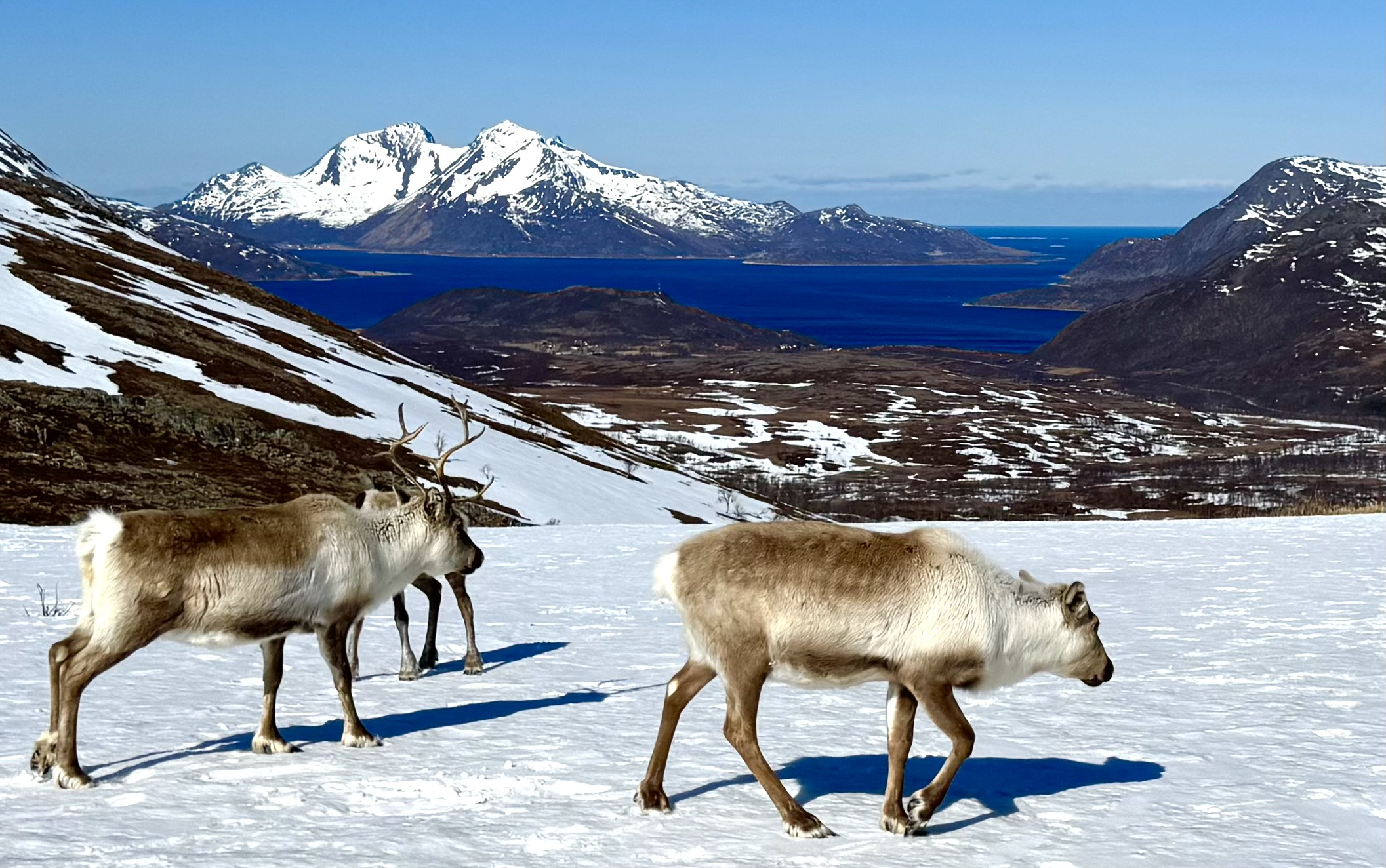
Reindeer on the Island of Kvaløya in Tromsø Municipality

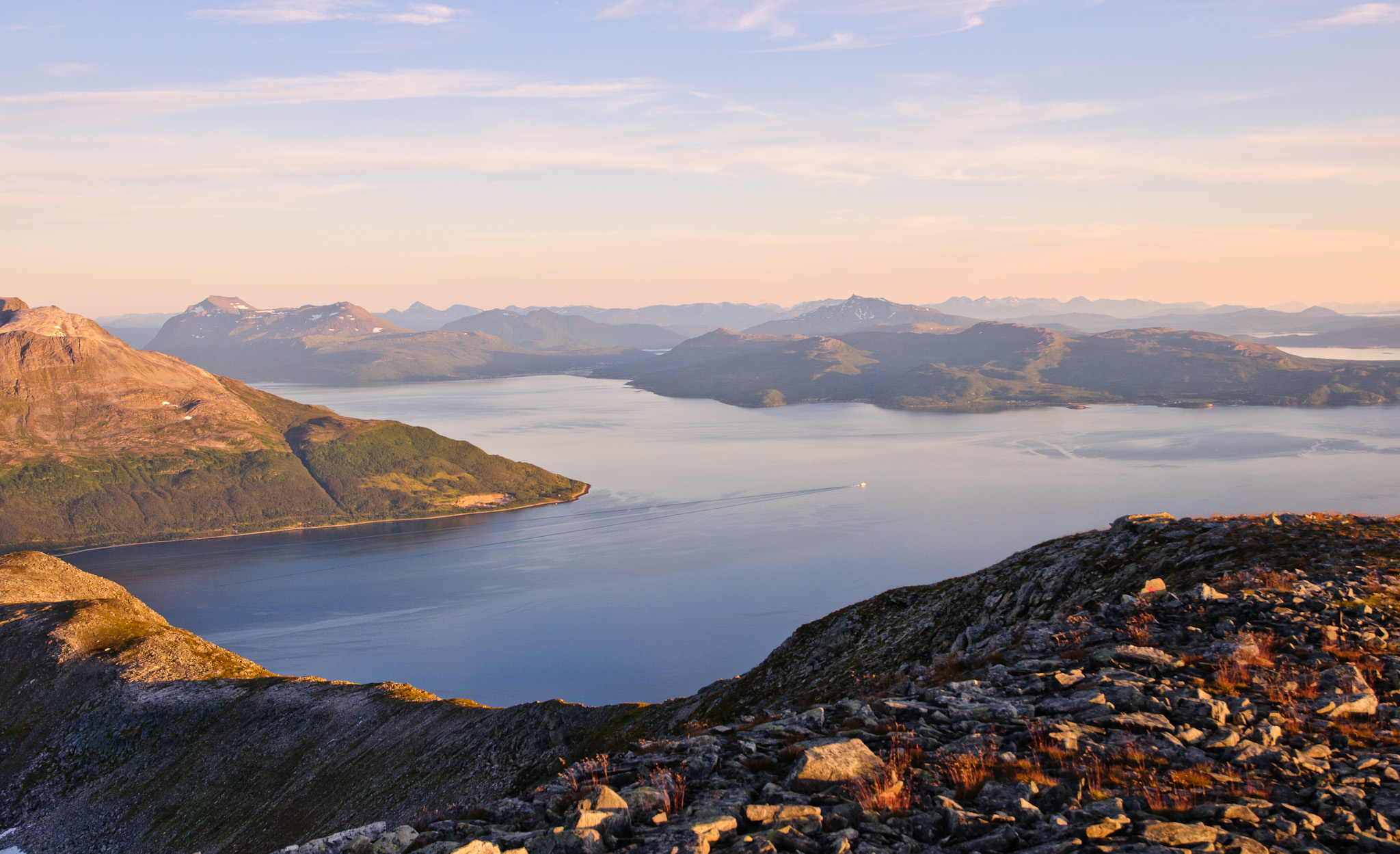
Gråtinden, Kvaløya

Tromsø experiences a subarctic climate (Köppen climate classification Dfc, Trewartha Eolo) as winter temperatures are just cold enough to qualify and the summer season is short. However, precipitation amount and pattern, with maximum precipitation in autumn and winter, as well as lack of permafrost, are atypical for subarctic areas and more typical for oceanic climates. Owing to the ice-free Norwegian Sea and the westerlies bringing the mild air ashore, winter temperatures in Tromsø are moderate and extremely mild for the latitude. Summers are rather cool, sometimes cloudy and rainy, and sometimes sunny, often with large variations from year to year and from month to month, giving a completely different experience, all depending on the weather pattern.

=== Sunshine ===
This variability in weather also gives a large variability in sunshine hours, which has been recorded since 1961: In July 1980 Tromsø recorded 430 sunhours, which is still the national record for sunniest month ever. However, July 1989 only recorded 91 sunhours. June has ranged from just 58 sunhours in June 2018 to 395 sunhours in June 1971 and also June 2002. Tromsø has also recorded the sunniest spring month in Norway with 381 sunhours in May 2013. The "midnight sun" is above the horizon from 19 May to 27 July (71 days), and the period with continuous night lasts a bit shorter, polar night from 28 November to 14 January (48 days). The sunniest January (1985) recorded just 9 sunhours, while the sunniest February saw 97 sunhours (2018).

=== Snow ===
Tromsø has reputation of accumulating a lot of snow in winter, but on the streets of the city ice often prevails, especially in the first half of the winter. Tromsø's snowfall pattern is quite erratic and varies substantially between different winters. Thaws with rain in the polar night mid-winter are not uncommon, which melts or wets existing snow, often followed by chilly windy Arctic blasts, creating dangerous ice driving and walking conditions. It is common to see Tromsø inhabitants walking with spikes in their shoes and almost all cars use studded tires. The all-time record for snow depth was set on 29 April 1997, when the meteorological station on top of Tromsøya recorded 240 centimetres (94.5 in) of snow on the ground. In an average winter, Tromsø sees 160 days with at least 25 centimetres (10 in) of snow on the ground (1970–2000 average, 100 meters above sea level). Despite mild relatively winters, snowfall can happen almost any time of the year except from July to mid-September; in 2019, snowfall was registered on 29 June.

=== Temperature ===
The lowest temperature ever recorded is −18.4 °C (−1.1 °F) in February 1966, which is extremely mild for a location this far north, as it is about the same as the record cold for the U.S. state of Florida − about 40 degrees latitude further south. At the airport the all-time low is −20.1 °C (−4.2 °F) in February 1985. The highest temperature recorded at the met office 100 m amsl is 30.2 °C (86.4 °F) in July 1972. Tromsø recorded its first "tropical night" with overnight low 20.8 °C (69.4 °F) on 30 July 2018. The average date for the last overnight freeze (low below 0 °C (32.0 °F)) in spring is 17 May and average date for first freeze in autumn is 3 October (1981–2010 average) giving a frost-free season of 138 days.

Recent years have seen warming. The recent normal period 1991–2020 shows that the part of the city at low altitude has winters so mild that melting of snow is more likely also in mid-winter. At the Norwegian Institute of Bioeconomy Research (NIBIO) at Holt (20 m) on the western side of Tromsøya, with recording since 1987, the coldest month (February) mean is −2.4 °C (27.7 °F). This makes it a subpolar oceanic climate if the −3.0 °C (26.6 °F) isotherm is used.

Climate data for Tromsø (Vervarslinga), 1991–2020 normals, (100 m, extremes 1920–present)
Month	Jan	Feb	Mar	Apr	May	Jun	Jul	Aug	Sep	Oct	Nov	Dec	Year
Record high °C (°F)	8.4 (47.1)	8.5 (47.3)	9.7 (49.5)	17.0 (62.6)	26.6 (79.9)	29.9 (85.8)	30.2 (86.4)	28.4 (83.1)	23.4 (74.1)	18.6 (65.5)	11.9 (53.4)	9.7 (49.5)	30.2 (86.4)
Mean daily maximum °C (°F)	−1.0 (30.2)	−1.2 (29.8)	0.6 (33.1)	4.1 (39.4)	8.8 (47.8)	13.0 (55.4)	16.3 (61.3)	15.0 (59.0)	10.9 (51.6)	5.2 (41.4)	2.1 (35.8)	0.3 (32.5)	6.2 (43.1)
Daily mean °C (°F)	−3.0 (26.6)	−3.3 (26.1)	−1.9 (28.6)	1.2 (34.2)	5.5 (41.9)	9.4 (48.9)	12.3 (54.1)	11.3 (52.3)	7.8 (46.0)	3.1 (37.6)	0.2 (32.4)	−1.7 (28.9)	3.4 (38.1)
Mean daily minimum °C (°F)	−5.3 (22.5)	−5.6 (21.9)	−4.4 (24.1)	−1.6 (29.1)	2.4 (36.3)	6.2 (43.2)	9.0 (48.2)	8.3 (46.9)	5.3 (41.5)	0.9 (33.6)	−1.9 (28.6)	−3.9 (25.0)	0.8 (33.4)
Record low °C (°F)	−18.3 (−0.9)	−18.4 (−1.1)	−17.0 (1.4)	−14.3 (6.3)	−6.6 (20.1)	−2.5 (27.5)	0.7 (33.3)	1.1 (34.0)	−4.3 (24.3)	−9.6 (14.7)	−14.2 (6.4)	−16.8 (1.8)	−18.4 (−1.1)
Average precipitation mm (inches)	108.3 (4.26)	96.7 (3.81)	96.7 (3.81)	71.1 (2.80)	56.5 (2.22)	58 (2.3)	72.5 (2.85)	88 (3.5)	111.3 (4.38)	127.4 (5.02)	94.4 (3.72)	109.7 (4.32)	1,090.6 (42.99)
Average precipitation days (≥ 1 mm)	15.4	12.9	11.4	11.6	11.1	10.3	12.8	12.6	14.9	17.7	13.5	15.6	160.1
Mean monthly sunshine hours	3	36	111	171	215	239	226	164	96	55	8	0	1,324
Mean daily daylight hours	1.8	7.4	11.8	16.3	22.1	24	23.6	18	13.3	8.9	3.6	0	12.6
Average ultraviolet index	0	0	1	2	3	3	3	2	1	0	0	0	1
Source 1: Met Norway, The Weather Network, Meteostat.net
Source 2: Weather Atlas (UV index and daylight hours)

Climate data for Tromsø Airport, Langnes 1991–2020 (8 m)
Month	Jan	Feb	Mar	Apr	May	Jun	Jul	Aug	Sep	Oct	Nov	Dec	Year
Mean daily maximum °C (°F)	−0.4 (31.3)	−0.7 (30.7)	0.7 (33.3)	3.9 (39.0)	8.6 (47.5)	12.5 (54.5)	15.6 (60.1)	14.5 (58.1)	10.7 (51.3)	5.5 (41.9)	2.6 (36.7)	0.9 (33.6)	6.2 (43.2)
Daily mean °C (°F)	−2.8 (27.0)	−3 (27)	−1.8 (28.8)	1.3 (34.3)	5.6 (42.1)	9.3 (48.7)	12.1 (53.8)	11.3 (52.3)	7.9 (46.2)	3.3 (37.9)	0.4 (32.7)	−1.4 (29.5)	3.5 (38.4)
Mean daily minimum °C (°F)	−5.5 (22.1)	−5.7 (21.7)	−4.5 (23.9)	−1.6 (29.1)	2.7 (36.9)	6.7 (44.1)	9.3 (48.7)	8.5 (47.3)	5.3 (41.5)	0.9 (33.6)	−2.1 (28.2)	−4 (25)	0.8 (33.5)
Average precipitation mm (inches)	103.1 (4.06)	92 (3.6)	90.3 (3.56)	61.9 (2.44)	54.9 (2.16)	53.1 (2.09)	60.9 (2.40)	77 (3.0)	104.5 (4.11)	123.4 (4.86)	94.5 (3.72)	108.9 (4.29)	1,024.5 (40.29)
Average precipitation days (≥ 1 mm)	15	13	14	12	11	10	10	11	14	15	13	15	153
Source: NOAA

Climate data for Tromsø, 2002–2020 averages & extremes
Month	Jan	Feb	Mar	Apr	May	Jun	Jul	Aug	Sep	Oct	Nov	Dec	Year
Record high °C (°F)	7.2 (45.0)	6.9 (44.4)	8.9 (48.0)	17.0 (62.6)	26.6 (79.9)	28.3 (82.9)	29.7 (85.5)	26.3 (79.3)	21.7 (71.1)	18.6 (65.5)	11.7 (53.1)	9.5 (49.1)	29.7 (85.5)
Mean maximum °C (°F)	5.0 (41.0)	5.2 (41.4)	5.6 (42.1)	11.3 (52.3)	18.4 (65.1)	21.3 (70.3)	24.8 (76.6)	22.9 (73.2)	17.7 (63.9)	12.0 (53.6)	7.8 (46.0)	6.4 (43.5)	25.3 (77.5)
Mean daily maximum °C (°F)	−1.8 (28.8)	−1.3 (29.7)	0.5 (32.9)	4.7 (40.5)	9.5 (49.1)	12.6 (54.7)	16.5 (61.7)	15.0 (59.0)	11.0 (51.8)	5.4 (41.7)	1.9 (35.4)	0.2 (32.4)	6.2 (43.1)
Daily mean °C (°F)	−3.4 (25.9)	−3.1 (26.4)	−1.8 (28.8)	1.9 (35.4)	6.3 (43.3)	9.5 (49.1)	13.0 (55.4)	11.9 (53.4)	8.4 (47.1)	3.5 (38.3)	0.5 (32.9)	−1.4 (29.5)	3.8 (38.8)
Mean daily minimum °C (°F)	−4.9 (23.2)	−4.9 (23.2)	−4.0 (24.8)	−0.9 (30.4)	3.1 (37.6)	6.3 (43.3)	9.4 (48.9)	8.7 (47.7)	5.8 (42.4)	1.6 (34.9)	−0.9 (30.4)	−2.9 (26.8)	1.4 (34.5)
Mean minimum °C (°F)	−11.7 (10.9)	−12.0 (10.4)	−10.2 (13.6)	−7.3 (18.9)	−1.7 (28.9)	1.8 (35.2)	5.6 (42.1)	3.8 (38.8)	0.5 (32.9)	−4.4 (24.1)	−7.0 (19.4)	−8.9 (16.0)	−13.6 (7.5)
Record low °C (°F)	−15.2 (4.6)	−18.3 (−0.9)	−13.1 (8.4)	−11.4 (11.5)	−4.1 (24.6)	0.1 (32.2)	3.2 (37.8)	1.1 (34.0)	−1.6 (29.1)	−8.0 (17.6)	−11.4 (11.5)	−13.5 (7.7)	−18.3 (−0.9)
Average precipitation mm (inches)	89.0 (3.50)	95.6 (3.76)	108.2 (4.26)	73.2 (2.88)	56.1 (2.21)	63.8 (2.51)	74.3 (2.93)	82.9 (3.26)	114.3 (4.50)	113.2 (4.46)	88.4 (3.48)	109.1 (4.30)	1,068.1 (42.05)
Average extreme snow depth cm (inches)	68 (27)	89 (35)	104 (41)	100 (39)	37 (15)	0 (0)	0 (0)	0 (0)	0 (0)	18 (7.1)	35 (14)	47 (19)	114 (45)
Source: Météo climat stats

Sea temperature data for Tromsø
Month	Jan	Feb	Mar	Apr	May	Jun	Jul	Aug	Sep	Oct	Nov	Dec	Year
Average sea temperature °C (°F)	5.2 (41.4)	4.6 (40.3)	4.2 (39.5)	4.6 (40.3)	6.2 (43.1)	8.8 (47.8)	10.8 (51.4)	11.3 (52.4)	10.1 (50.3)	8.3 (47.0)	7.6 (45.6)	6.4 (43.6)	7.3 (45.2)
Source: Weather Atlas

=== Light and darkness ===
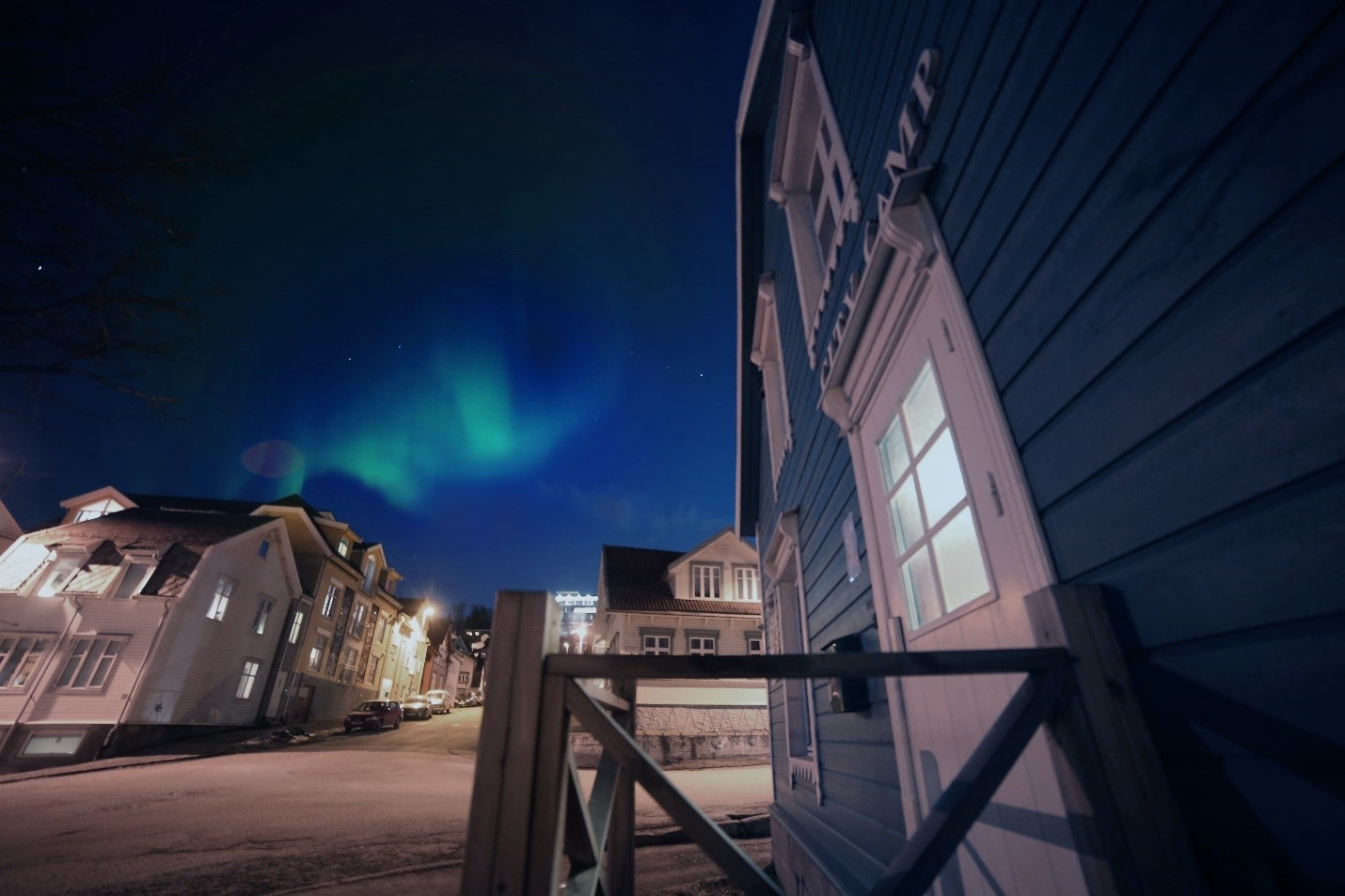
Northern lights in Tromsø

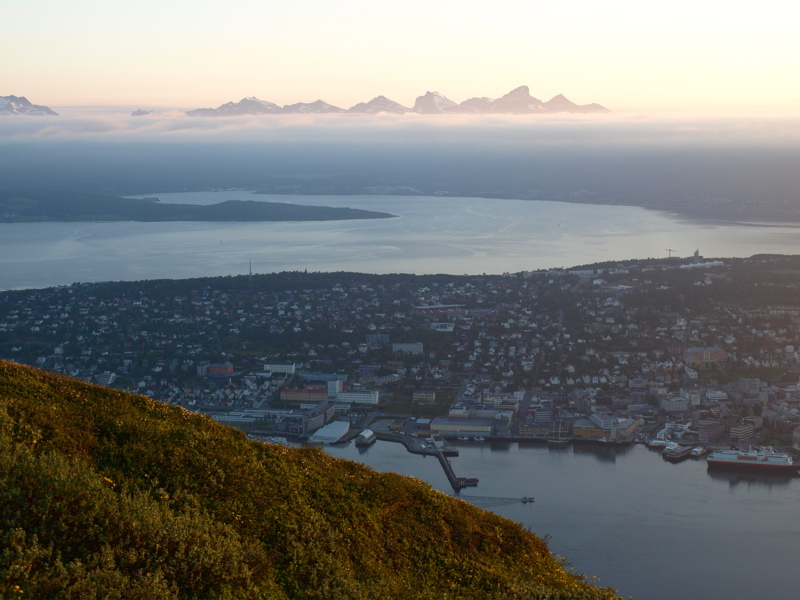
Tromsø in midnight sun in July

The midnight sun occurs from about 18 May to 26 July, but mountains block the view of it for a few days, meaning that one can see the midnight sun from about 21 May to 21 July. Owing to Tromsø's high latitude, twilight is long, meaning there is no true darkness between March 27 and September 17.

The sun remains below the horizon during the polar night from about 26 November to 15 January, but due to the mountains, the sun is not visible from 21 November to 21 January. The return of the sun is an occasion for celebration. However, because of the twilight, there is some daylight for a couple of hours even around midwinter, often with bluish light, allowing for normal day/night cycles during the winter. The nights shorten quickly. By 21 February, the sun is above the horizon from 7:45 am to 4:10 pm and, by 1 April, is above the horizon from 5:50 am to 7:50 pm (daylight saving time). However, if one were to include astronomical twilight as "not night", then Tromsø only has 13 hours and 32 minutes of night on the winter solstice.

The combination of snow cover and sunshine often creates intense light conditions from late February until the snow melts in the lowland (usually late April), and sunglasses are essential when skiing. Because of these diametrically different light conditions in winter, Norwegians often divide it into two seasons: Mørketid (polar night) and Seinvinter (late winter).

It is possible to observe the aurora borealis (northern lights) from Tromsø, as northern Norway is located in the auroral zone. As it is always light in the summer, no aurora is visible between late April and mid August. Additionally, due to the coastal location, Tromsø is often subject to cloudy conditions, which prevent aurorae from being seen, even if they are present.

== Cityscape ==
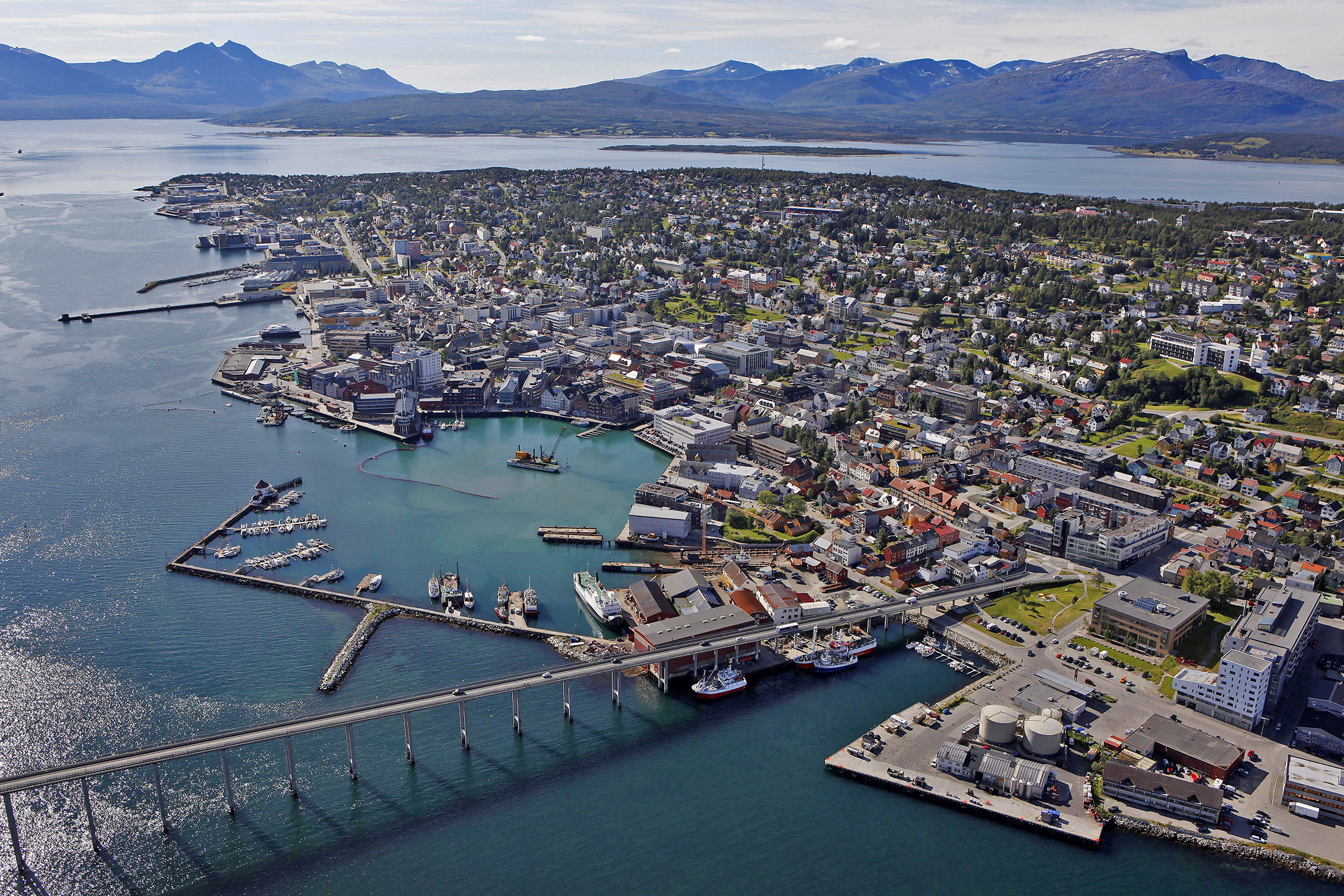
Tromsø city

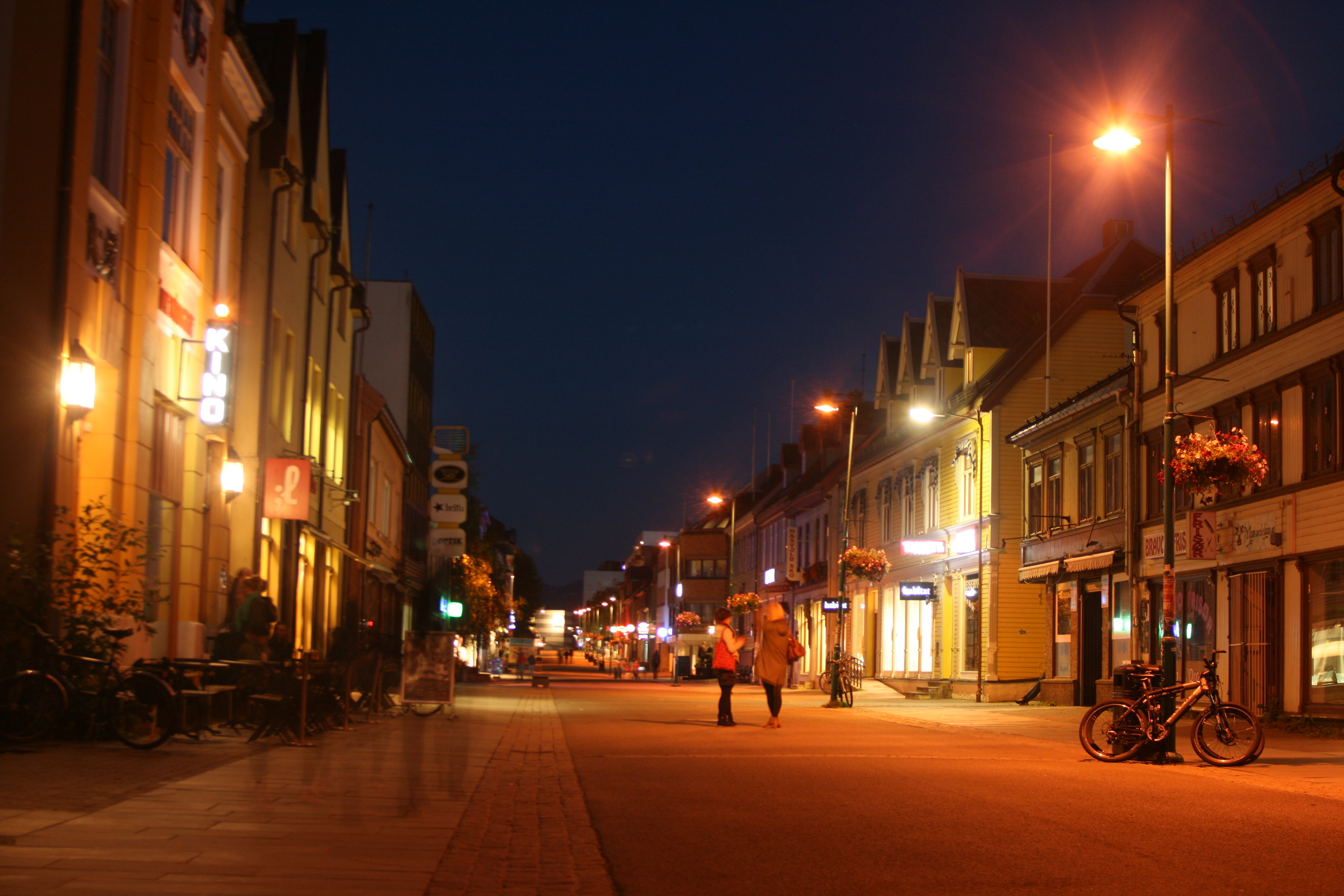
Storgata, Tromsø

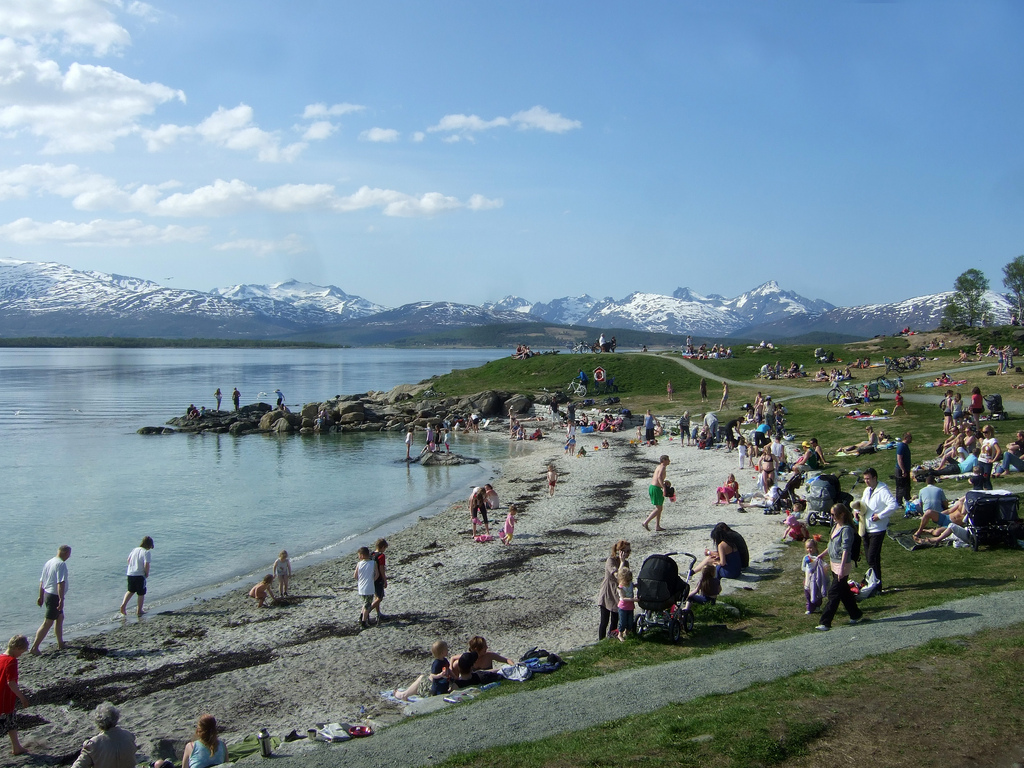
Telegrafbukta in Tromsø

The compact city centre has the biggest concentration of historic wooden houses north of Trondheim, and they co-exist with modern architecture. The houses date from 1789 to 1904, when building wooden houses was banned in the city centre, as in several other Norwegian cities. The oldest house in Tromsø is Skansen, built in 1789 on the remains of a 13th-century turf rampart.

The Polar Museum, Polarmuseet, situated in a wharf house from 1837, presents Tromsø's past as a centre for Arctic hunting and starting point for Arctic expeditions. Tromsø Cathedral, Norway's only wooden cathedral, built in 1861, is located in the middle of the city, and so is the small Catholic church Vår Frue ("Our Lady"). Northern Europe's oldest operational cinema, Verdensteatret, was built in 1915–16. The cinema has large wall paintings, made by the local artist Sverre Mack in 1921, which picture scenes from Norwegian folk lore and fairy tales. The Arctic Cathedral, a modern church built in 1965, is situated on the mainland, facing the sound and city centre. The church, in reality a parish church and not a cathedral, was designed by Jan Inge Hovig. The Polaria aquarium and experience centre, opened in 1998, is a short walk south from the city centre. The Tromsø Museum is a university museum, presenting culture and nature of North Norway. The museum also displays the Arctic-alpine botanic garden, the world's northernmost botanical garden. A cable car goes up to mount Storsteinen, 420 metres (1,380 feet) above sea level, with a panoramic view over Tromsø. The mountain Tromsdalstinden, 1,238 metres (4,062 ft), on the mainland, which is easily spotted from the city centre, is also a major landmark. At the top of Tromsøya is a lake called Prestvannet.

=== Villages ===
The Tromsø municipality includes these villages:

Kvaløya	Tromsøya Tromsø (city)	Mainland
Brensholmen; Ersfjordbotn; Kaldfjord; Kjosen; Sandneshamn; Sommarøya; Kvaløysletta	Bjerkaker; Hamna; Skattøra	Tromsdalen; Breivikeidet; Kroken; Jøvika; Lakselvbukt; Oldervik; Movik; Ramfjordnes; Sjursnes

== Government ==
The city of Tromsø is located within Tromsø Municipality, and the municipality is what holds the local government authority, the urban city centre has no separate governmental powers. Tromsø Municipality is responsible for primary education (through 10th grade), outpatient health services, senior citizen services, welfare and other social services, zoning, economic development, and municipal roads and utilities. The municipality is governed by a municipal council of directly elected representatives. The mayor is indirectly elected by a vote of the municipal council. The municipality is under the jurisdiction of the Nord-Troms og Senja District Court and the Hålogaland Court of Appeal.

The city of Tromsø was established as an independent municipality on 1 January 1838 (see formannskapsdistrikt law). The city was completely surrounded by the Tromsøe landdistrikt (the rural municipality of Tromsø / later renamed Tromsøysund Municipality), but they were governed separately. As the city grew in size, areas were added to the city from the rural district.

== Economics ==
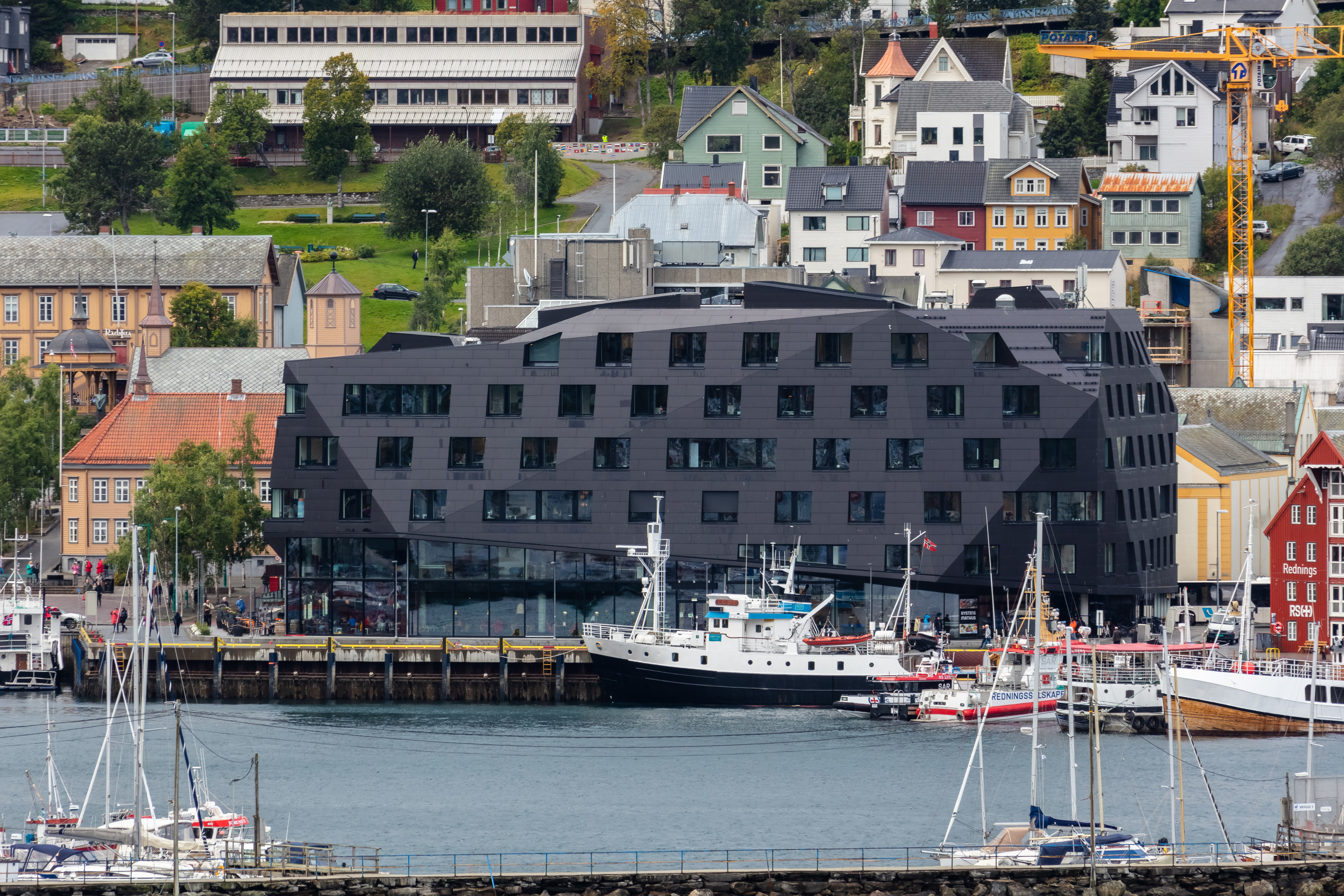
Coastal Seafood Center in Northern Norway (Norwegian: Kystens Hus)

Tromsø is one of the largest fishing ports in Norway. Secondary to fishing, the University of Tromsø is a center for Arctic research. Tourism has exploded as an alternative economic resource in recent decades. There are now direct flights from many European countries.

In 2021, the US Navy opened facilities to service American submarines at the port, after undergoing a significant expansion in 2020.

== Demographics ==
Historical population
Year	1845	1855	1865	1875	1891	1900	1910	1920	1930	1946	1951	1960	1970	1980	1990	2000	2010	2020	2024
Pop.	2,011	2,958	4,073	5,443	6,000	6,996	7,633	10,071	10,336	10,990	10,940	12,283	38,094	45,833	50,548	59,145	67,305	76,974	78,745
±% p.a.	—	+3.93%	+3.25%	+2.94%	+0.61%	+1.72%	+0.88%	+2.81%	+0.26%	+0.38%	−0.09%	+1.29%	+11.98%	+1.87%	+0.98%	+1.58%	+1.30%	+1.35%	+0.57%
Note: The municipal borders were changed in 1964, causing a significant change in the population. Source: Statistics Norway and Norwegian Historical Data Centre

More than 100 nationalities are represented in the population. Among the more prominent minorities are the Sami, Russians, and Finns, both the local Kvens (descendants of 19th-century Finnish immigrants) and recent immigrants from Finland proper. The world's northernmost mosque is to be found in Tromsø. Our Lady Catholic church is the seat of the world's northernmost Catholic Bishop, who leads the Roman Catholic Territorial Prelature of Tromsø. Although the local Catholic population is only 350 strong, Pope John Paul II visited this small church and stayed as a guest of the bishop in 1989.

Main immigrant groups, 2023
Nationality	Population
Poland	1,076
Germany	606
Russia	533
Sweden	524
Syria	476
Finland	399
Thailand	389
Eritrea	353
Lithuania	340
Somalia	330
Denmark	303
United Kingdom	256
Latvia	224
Philippines	202
Romania	194

=== Sami population ===
As noted in the history section, the Tromsø area has long been home to Sámi culture. The assimilation of the Coastal Sámi, however, led to the local Sámi culture becoming increasingly invisible in the Tromsø area during the 20th century. Today there is a Sami kindergarten and Sami language classes in certain schools of Tromsø. There have been attempts at countering the decline of the Sámi language through the establishment of a Sami language centre in Lakselvbukt in the Ullsfjorden area. Tromsø Municipality has generally displayed a positive attitude to the indigenous minority culture. For example, the municipality has arranged the Sámi People's Day; signs at the university are bilingual; and when the city made its bid for the Winter Olympics, the Sámi name of Tromsø, Romsa, was included in the proposed logo for the event along with a traditional Sámi symbol as its main visual element.

=== 2011 language controversy ===
In 2011, the role of Sámi culture in Tromsø became controversial. The Municipal Board had applied for Tromsø to join the Sámi Language Administrative Area. This would have entailed giving equal space to selected Sámi toponyms on signposts, allowing Sámi-speakers to communicate in their language with local authorities, and making means available from the Sámi Parliament for officials to learn Sámi. Political parties, such as the FrP, Venstre and Høyre, opposed the decision and made it a part of their election campaign to reverse it, claiming that, as "a Norwegian city", Tromsø was not required to display Sámi toponyms along with Norwegian ones or make Sámi an official language along with Norwegian. The parties opposing a larger role for Sámi culture in Tromsø won the election and reversed the application. It has been claimed that the issue has "divided" Tromsø's inhabitants between those who see Sámi culture as naturally belonging there and those who see it as alien to the area. During and after the election campaign, pro-Sámi politicians received threats and people wearing traditional Sámi garb claim to have been subjected to verbal abuse. In June 2013 the municipality nonetheless entered into a cooperation agreement with the Sámi Parliament which is intended to strengthen Sámi language education and Sámi culture in Tromsø.

== Culture ==
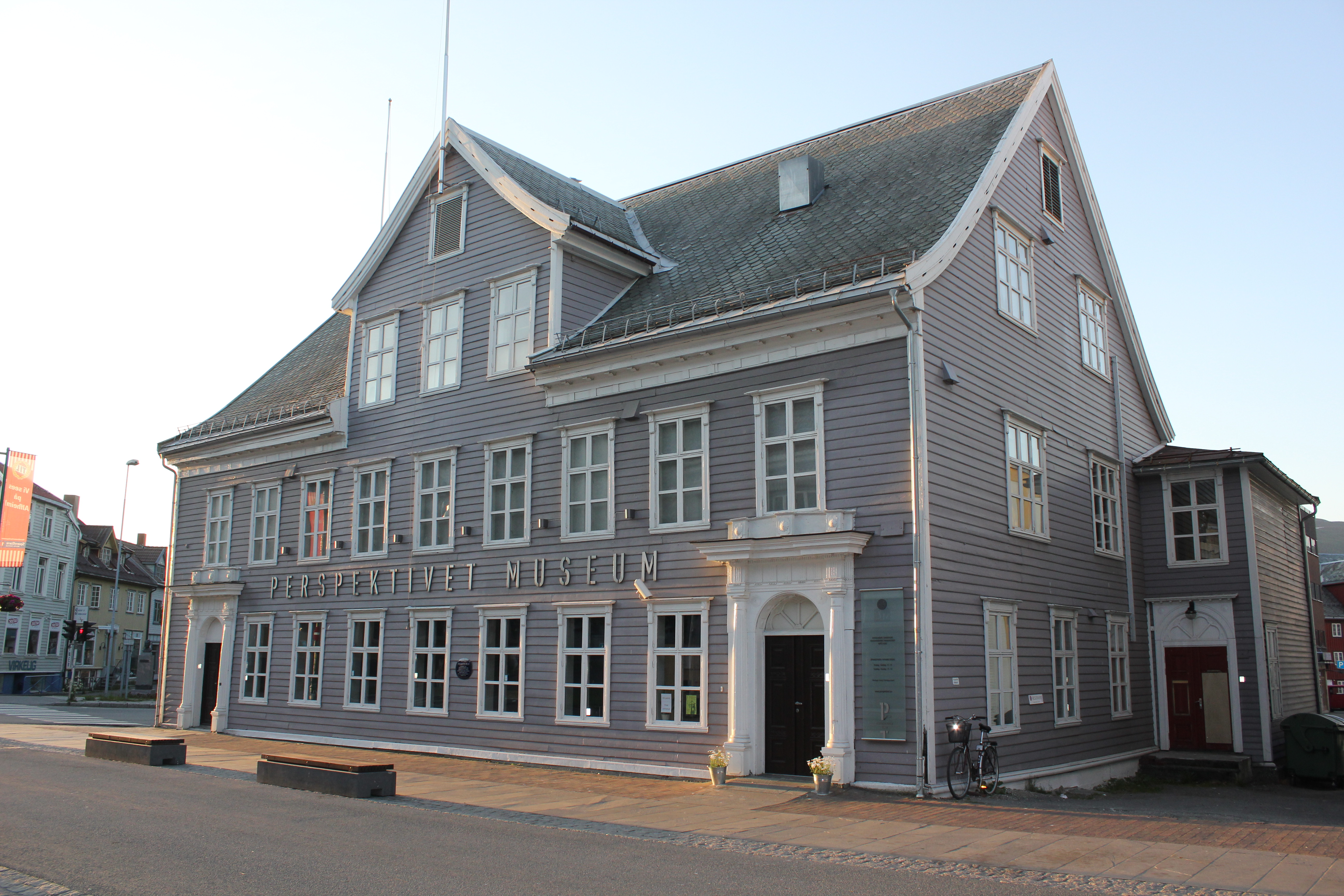
Perspektivet Museum

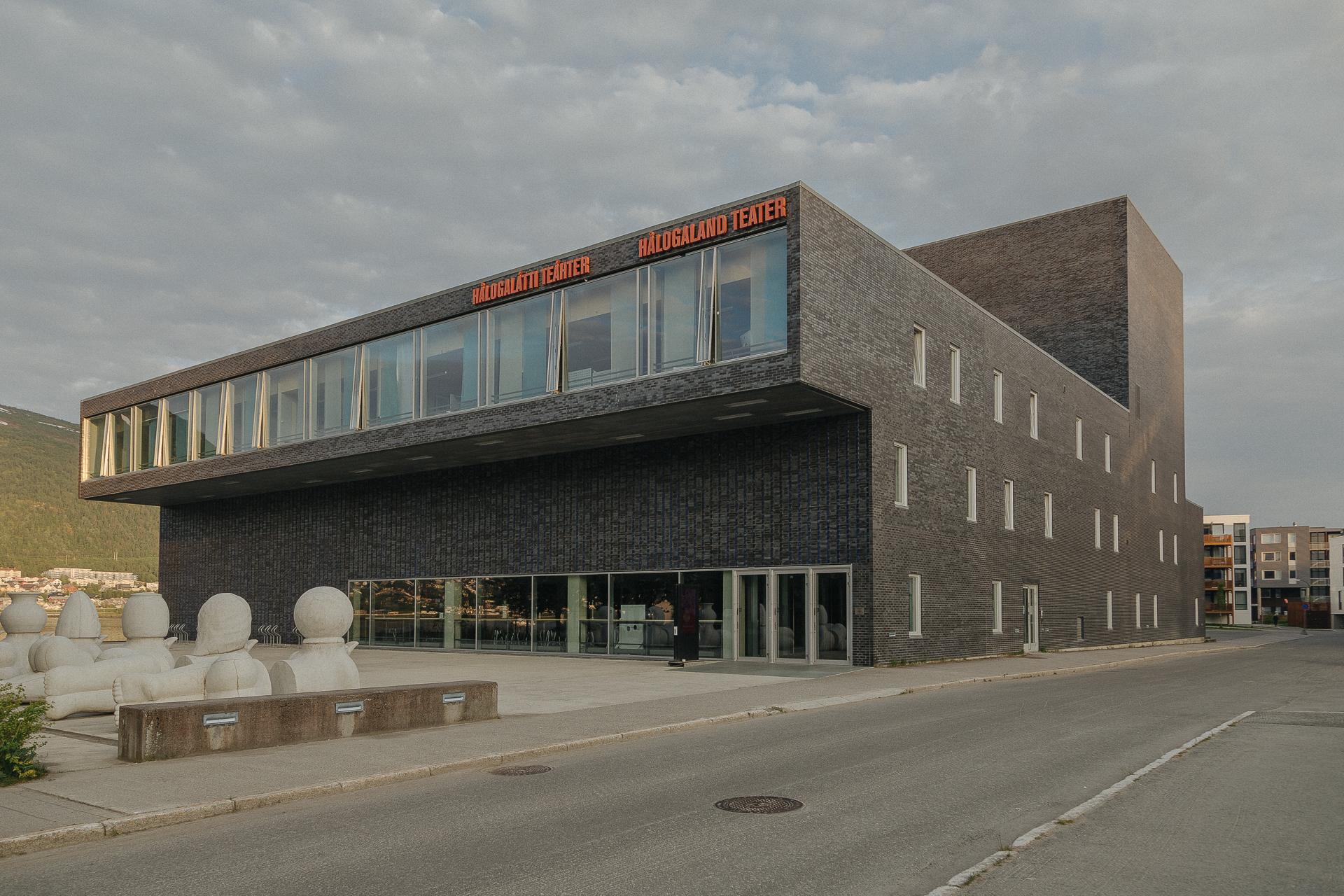
Hålogaland theatre

Tromsø Library

Being the largest city in Northern Norway, the city of Tromsø is a cultural centre for the municipality and its surrounding region. It gained some international attention when on 11 June 2005 hosted one of six 46664 concerts, designed to put work concerning HIV/AIDS on the international agenda. Torbjørn Brundtland and Svein Berge of the electronica duo Röyksopp and Lene Marlin grew up and started their careers in Tromsø.

Many cultural activities take place in the Cultural Centre (Norwegian: Kulturhuset), including concerts by the Norwegian Arctic Philharmonic Orchestra. Tromsø also has a professional theatre troupe performing at the new theatre building opened in 2005 Hålogaland Teater. The city contains several museums including the Northern Norwegian Art Gallery (Norwegian: Nordnorsk Kunstmuseum), the Tromsø Gallery of Contemporary Art (Norwegian: Tromsø Kunstforening), the first and only Troll museum in Norway and the Perspektivet Museum, which is devoted to Cora Sandel and documentary photography.

The Tromsø techno scene is the origin of many of Norway's most important artists in electronic music, and Tromsø was a leading city at the early stages of the house and techno scene in Norway in the late 1980s. Röyksopp and the ambient electronic musician Geir Jennsen, known as Biosphere, are both from the town.

The local newspapers are iTromsø and Nordlys.

The Arctic Council has its headquarters in Tromsø.

== Festivals and celebrations ==
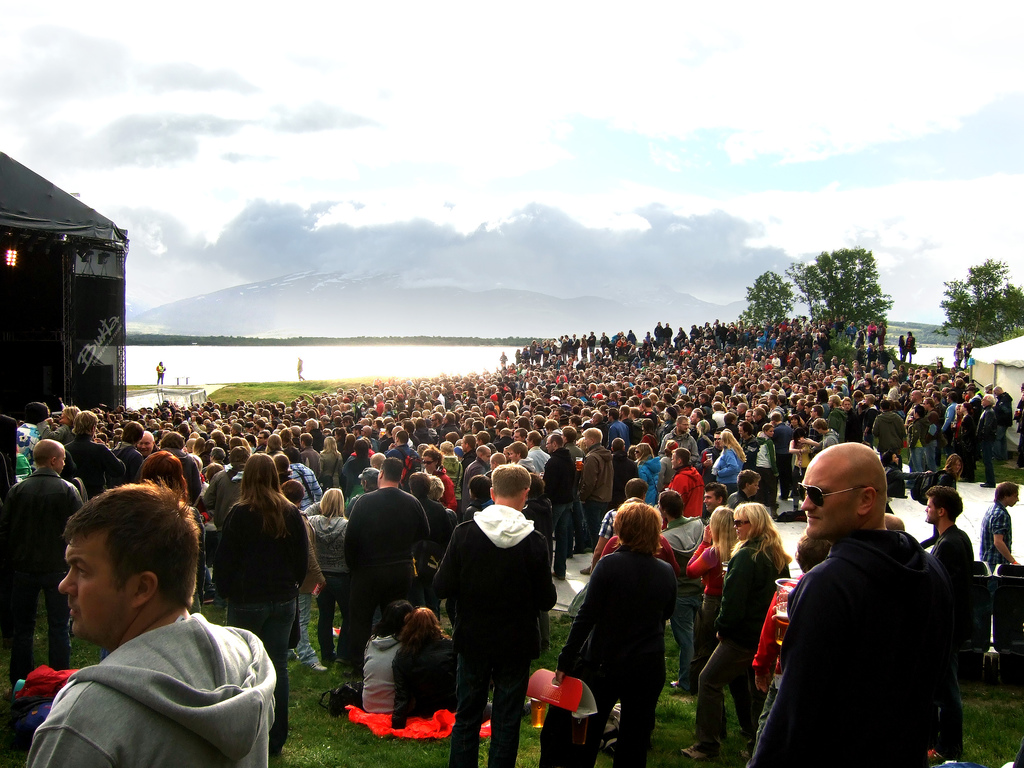
Bukta Tromsø Open Air Festival

Both the Tromsø International Film Festival and Nordlysfestivalen (lit. 'the Aurora Borealis Festival'), a classical music festival, are arranged in January. The end of that month is marked by the 'Day of the Sun' (Soldagen), when the sun finally appears above the horizon after the Polar Night, which is celebrated, mainly by children. The International Day of the Sami People is celebrated at the University of Tromsø and the city hall on 6 February every year. Tromsø's Latin American Festival, No Siesta Fiesta, is held at the end of February. It started in 2007 and showcases "the best of Latin America" in Northern Norway with film, dance, music, art, seminars, debates, markets, and a street Samba parade. Every autumn the Insomnia Festival for electronic music is hosted. It is one of the largest and most important festivals for electronic music and techno culture in Norway.

The Bukta Tromsø Open Air Festival, held in June and July, is a popular music festival. The Bukta festival is mainly a rock festival, but also features other kinds of modern music. The festival takes place in Telegrafbukta, a park on the south-western part of the Tromsøya island. Other popular cultural summer events among the population of Tromsø is the Karlsøy festival and the Riddu Riddu festival, both held in the region surrounding the city.

== Sports ==
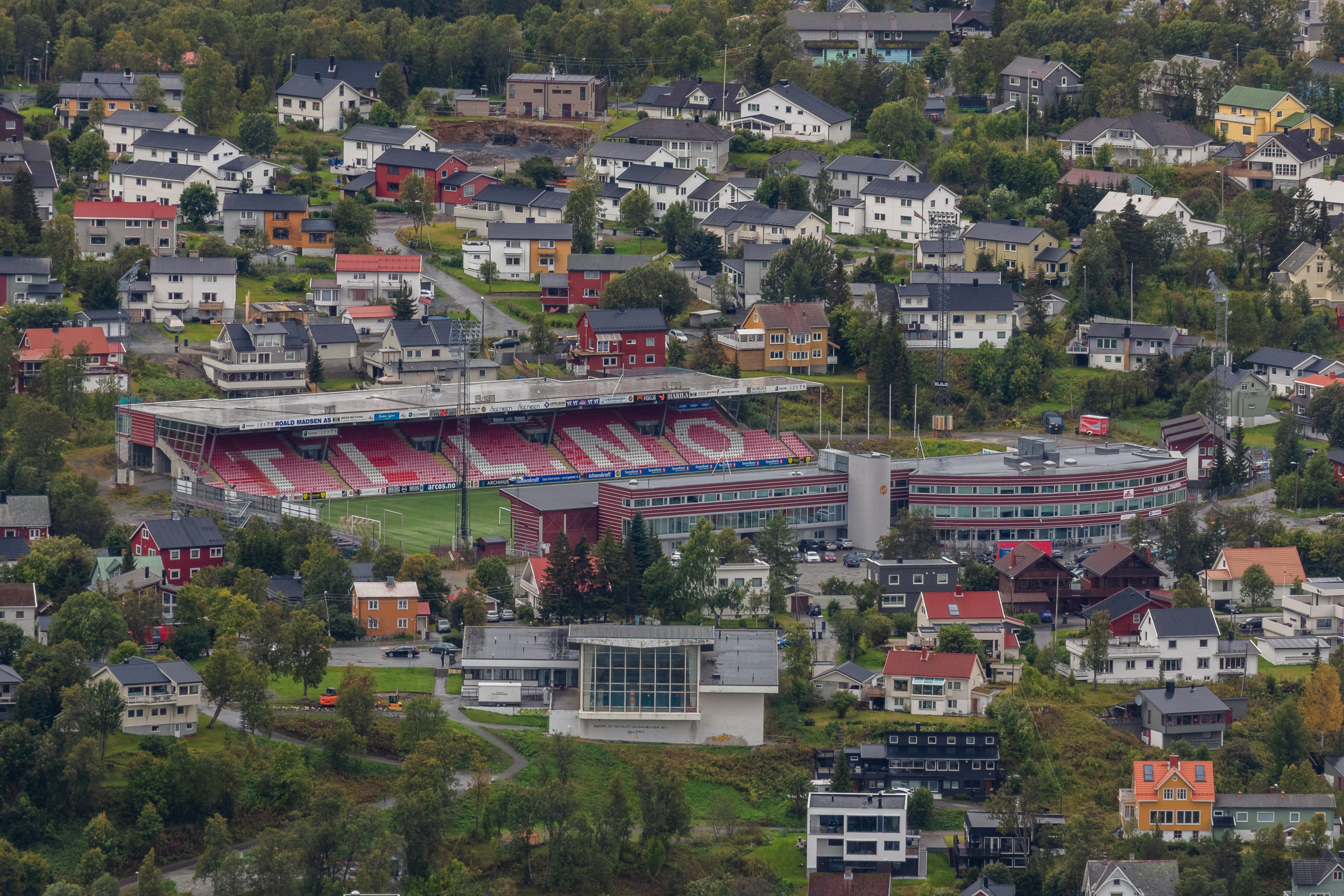
The stadium to Tromsø IL

Tromsø is the home of many football clubs, of which the three most prominent are Tromsø IL, which plays in the Norwegian Premier League and is the world's northernmost Premier League football team, I.F. Fløya in the Norwegian First Division (women), and Tromsdalen U.I.L., playing in the Adeccoliga. Tromsø Midnight Sun Marathon is arranged every year in June and recently also a Polar Night Halfmarathon in January. The city is home to many clubs in the top division in various sports. Most notably basketball-outfit Tromsø Storm in the BLNO, BK Tromsø in the top volleyball league for men, and Tromsø Volley in the top volleyball league for women. The oldest sports club in Tromsø is Tromsø Turnforening, a gymnastics club founded in 1862, that also was the cradle of the before mentioned football club Tromsø IL. A former American Football team was Tromsø Trailblazers.

Tromsø was selected by the Norwegian National Olympic Committee as Norway's candidate for the 2018 Winter Olympics. This would have made Tromsø the first city north of the Arctic Circle to host the games. There were plans to use ships as the media village. In October 2008 the NOC suspended Tromsø's bid, citing excessive costs. From the southern to the northern tip of the island Tromsøya, there is a floodlit cross-country ski track. A ski jump is also situated on the island, close to the university. 2010 saw the opening of the city's first ice hockey arena and it is home to Tromsø Hockey, which plays in the Swedish Ice Hockey Association's League 3. Tromsø is also home to the northernmost tennis club in Norway.

== Notable people ==
=== Public servants ===
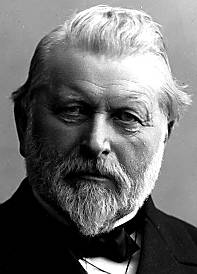
Johannes Steen

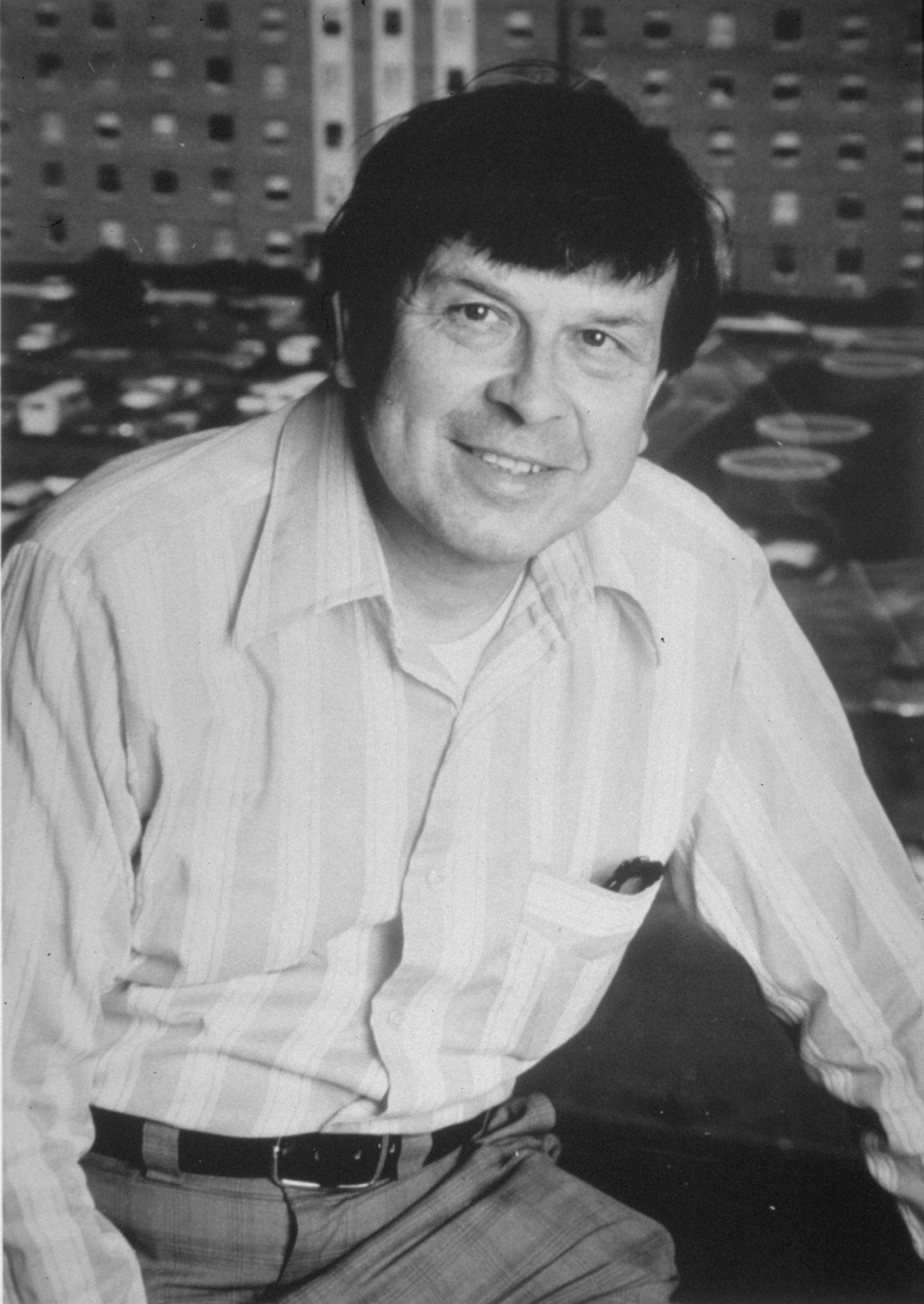
Daniel Carleton Gajdusek

- Johannes Steen (1827–1906), educator, politician, Mayor of Tromsø from 1856-1862, and Prime Minister of Norway from 1891-1893
- Oscar Nissen (1843–1911), physician, newspaper editor, and politician
- Paul Steenstrup Koht (1844–1892), educator, politician, city mayor, and member of the Storting
- Hans Jacob Horst (1848–1931), politician who was a member of the International Court of Arbitration (1906-1929) and a member of the Norwegian Nobel Committee (1903-1931)
- Just Knud Qvigstad (1853–1957), philologist, linguist, ethnographer, cultural historian, headmaster, politician, and Mayor of Tromsø
- Dorothea Schjoldager (1853–1938), feminist proponent for women's rights, school teacher, and social worker
- James Trane (1857–1936), Norwegian-American inventor and industrialist who co-founded Trane
- Einar Hoidale (1870–1952), lawyer, newspaper editor, and politician from Minnesota
- Arnold Holmboe (1873–1956), politician for the Liberal Party and Mayor of Tromsø
- Halvdan Koht (1873–1965), historian, politician, and former head of the Ministry of Foreign Affairs
- Kirsten Sand (1895–1996), first fully technically qualified female Norwegian architect
- Einar Johansen (1915–1996), engineer and decorated resistance member during WWII
- Martin Siem (1915–1996), businessperson and WWII resistance member
- Daniel Carleton Gajdusek (1923–2008), American physician, medical researcher, and co-recipient of the Nobel Prize in Physiology or Medicine for work on prion disease
- Hermod Skånland (1925–2011), economist and Governor of the Central Bank of Norway 1985 to 1993
- Gerd Fleischer (born 1942), human rights activist
- Svein Ludvigsen (born 1946), former politician and convicted sex offender
- Mads Gilbert (born 1947), physician, humanitarian, activist, and politician
- Herman Kristoffersen (1947–2026), former long-serving Mayor of Tromsø who was known as Red Hermann
- Hans-Tore Bjerkaas (born 1951), former Director-General of the Norwegian Broadcasting Corporation

=== The arts ===
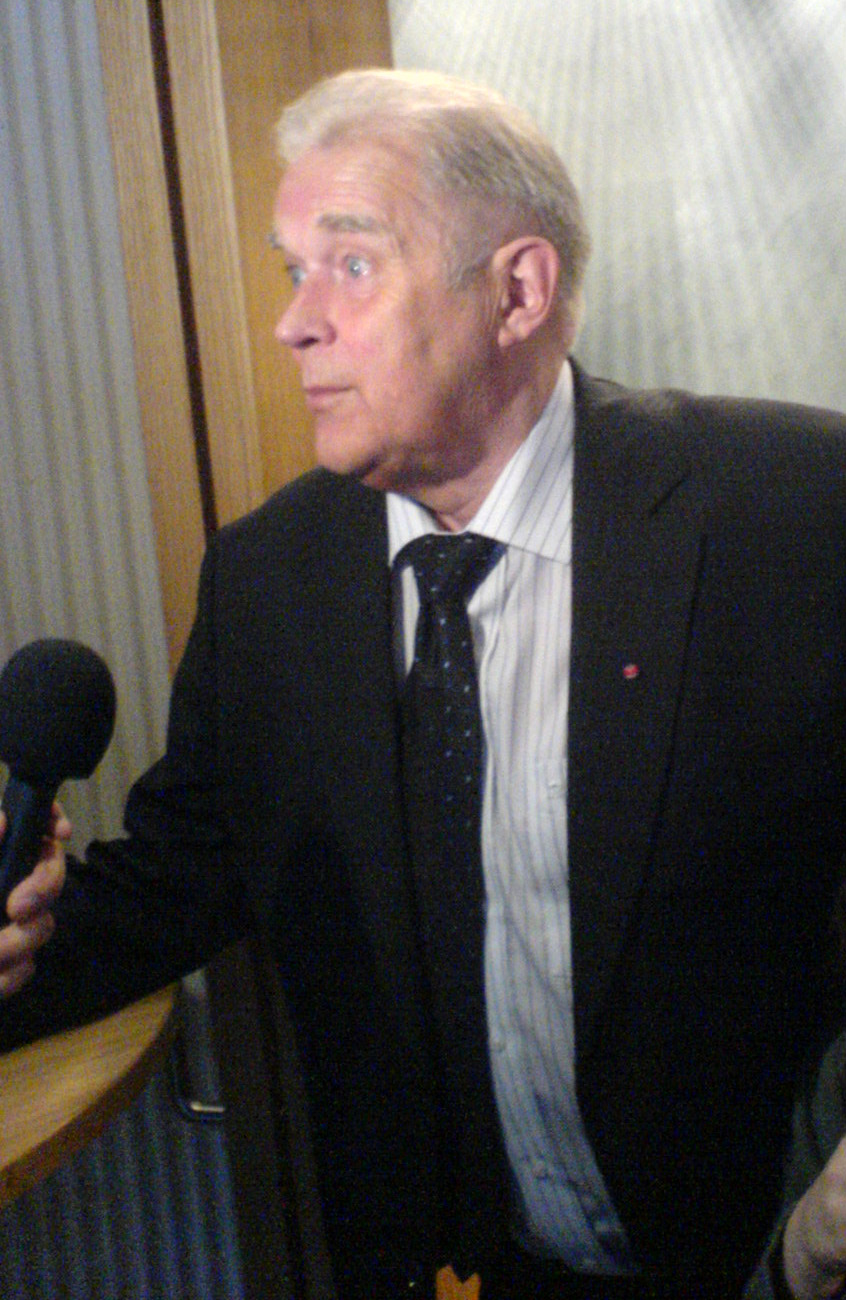
Arthur Arntzen, 2007

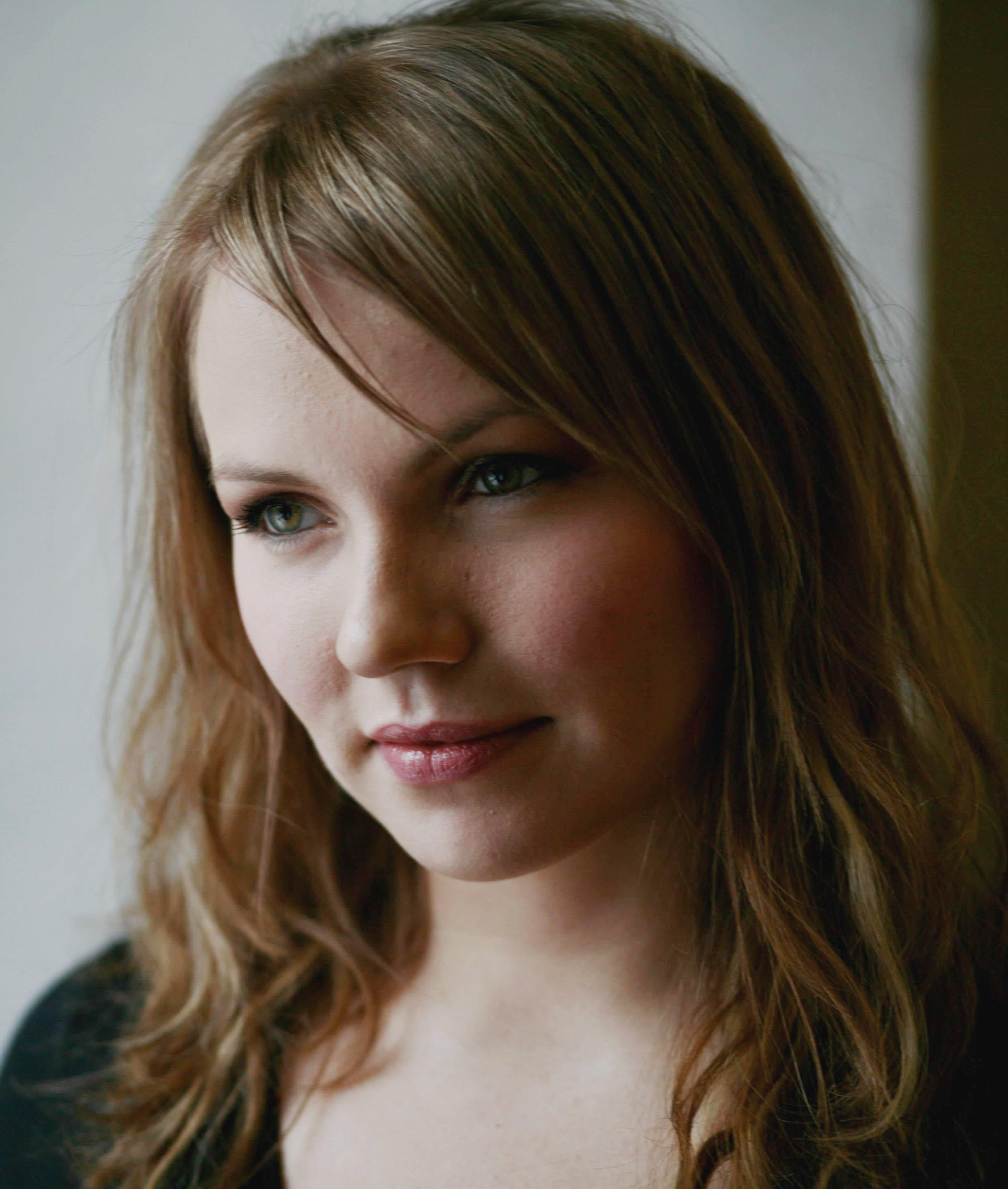
Lene Marlin, 2009

- Jorgen Dreyer (1877–1948), American sculptor of monuments who emigrated in 1903
- Cora Sandel (1880–1974), writer and painter
- Peter Wessel Zapffe (1899–1990), metaphysician, author, lawyer, and mountaineer
- Lars Berg (1901–1969), teacher, novelist, short story writer, and playwright
- Egil Rasmussen (1903–1964), author, literature critic, and pianist, grew up in Tromsø
- Kristian Kristiansen (1909–1980), novelist, playwright, and writer of short stories
- Rønnaug Alten (1910–2001), actress and stage instructor
- Yngvar Ustvedt (1928–2007), writer, biographer, critic, and radio personality
- Per Bronken (1935–2002), poet, novelist, actor, film director, and stage producer
- Arthur Arntzen (1937–2025), journalist, humorist, actor, and writer
- Kirsti Sparboe (born 1946), musical performer and actress
- Jorun Thørring (born 1955), specialist in gynaecology and author
- Geir Jenssen (born 1962), electronic musician whose stage name is Biosphere
- The Pussycats (band 1964), pop-rock band
- Erik Skjoldbjærg (born 1964), writer and film director
- Helge Andreas Norbakken (born 1965), drummer
- Anneli Drecker (born 1969), singer, actress, and frontwoman for Bel Canto
- Dag-Are Haugan (born 1970), musician with the group Alog
- Espen Lind (born 1971), record producer, songwriter, singer, and multi-instrumentalist
- Espen Sommer Eide (born 1972), composer and musician with Alog
- Thomas Thormodsæter Haugen (born 1974) stage name Samoth, multi-instrumentalist in the black metal band Emperor
- Lisa Stokke (born 1975), actor and singer
- Svein Berge (born 1976) and Torbjørn Brundtland (born 1975), musicians in the duo Röyksopp
- Ewa Da Cruz (born 1976), Norwegian-American television, soap opera, and film actress
- Lene Marlin (born 1980), singer-songwriter and musician
- Dagny Norvoll Sandvik (born 1990), singer, pop musician, and songwriter
- Neograss (formed 2010), a progressive rock band.

=== Sport ===
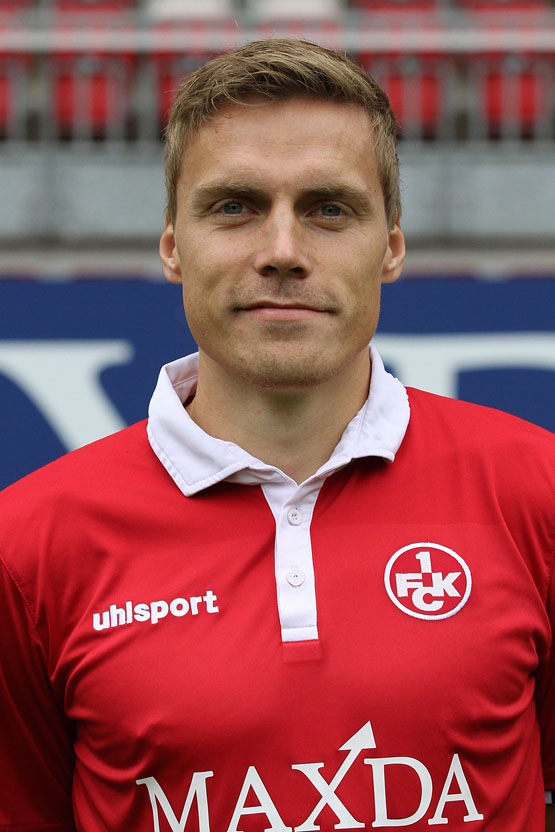
Ruben Yttergård Jenssen, 2015

- Per-Mathias Høgmo (born 1959), football manager, former manager of both the men and women's national football teams
- Bjørn Johansen (born 1969), former Norwegian footballer with over 400 club caps
- Roger Nilsen (born 1969), football coach and former player with 329 club caps and 32 for Norway
- Bjarte Engen Vik (born 1971), former Norwegian Nordic combined athlete, multiple medallist at the 1994 and 1998 Winter Olympics
- Ole Martin Årst (born 1974), retired footballer who grew up in Tromsø and earned 414 club caps, 22 for Norway
- Ailo Gaup (born 1979), former Freestyle Motocross rider who invented the Underflip
- Morten Giæver (born 1982), football midfielder with over 430 club caps, brought up in Tromsø
- Ruben Yttergård Jenssen (born 1988), footballer with over 350 club caps and 39 for Norway
- Guro Pettersen (born 1991), football goalkeeper for the Norway national team
- Vilde Nilsen (born 2001), paralympic cross-country skier and biathlete, team silver medallist at the 2018 Winter Paralympics
- Elling Carlsen (1819–1900), skipper, seal hunter, and explorer
- Richard With (1846–1930), ship's captain, businessman, and politician
- Henry Rudi (1889–1970), trapper and polar bear hunter
- Nikolai Schirmer (born 1991), freeride skier, filmmaker and climate activist

== Twin towns – sister cities ==
Tromsø is twinned with:

- (Alaska) Anchorage, United States (1969)
- (Gaza Strip) Gaza City, The Palestinian Authority (2001)
- Kemi, Finland (1940)
- Luleå, Sweden (1950)
- Quetzaltenango, Guatemala (1999)
- Zagreb, Croatia (1971)

Tromsø signed a sister city agreement with Murmansk on 10 July 1972 and terminated it on 22 October 2022, after the Russian invasion of Ukraine began in February 2022.

== In popular culture ==
Since January 2024, Tromsø has the northernmost McDonald's in the world, taking the title from Rovaniemi, Finland. It is also home to the northernmost location of many chains, such as Burger King, 7-Eleven and even a Hard Rock Cafe.

== See also ==
- List of towns and cities in Norway
