= Kjosen =

Kjosen may refer to the following locations:

- Kjosen, Telemark, a village in Drangedal Municipality in Telemark county, Norway
- Kjosen, Lyngen, a village in Lyngen Municipality in Troms county, Norway
- Kjosen, Tromsø, a village in Tromsø Municipality in Troms county, Norway
- Kjosen (Troms), a fjord arm off of the main Ullsfjorden in Tromsø and Lyngen municipalities in Troms county, Norway
