= Blue Men =

Blue Men or Blue Man may refer to:

== Arts and entertainment ==
- Blue Man Group, an American performance art company
- Joe Meek and the Blue Men, who recorded the 1960 album I Hear a New World
- The Blue Man, a 1961 novel by Kin Platt
- The Blue Man (film), a 1985 Canadian horror film
- The Blue Men (Playhouse 90), a 1959 television play directed by John Frankenheimer

== Other uses ==
- Blámaðr (Old Norse, 'blue man'), a historic Nordic designation for dark-skinned people
- Blue people, English exonym for Tuareg people
- Blue men of the Minch, mythological creatures also known as storm kelpies
- Blue Man (horse) (foaled 1949), an American Thoroughbred racehorse

== See also ==
- Bluesmen (disambiguation)
- Men in blue (disambiguation)
