= Alog =

Norwegian musical group

Alog is a Norwegian musical duo.

Alog was formed in Tromsø in Troms county, Norway in 1997 and produced experimental electronic music.

The musical duo consists of Norwegian musicians Espen Sommer Eide and Dag-Are Haugan. The band records for Rune Grammofon, a Norwegian record label focusing on improv, electronica, jazz, avant rock and alternative pop. In 2005, Alog was the winner of the Spellemannprisen, the Norwegian equivalent of the Grammy.

== Musical releases ==
=== Albums ===
- Red Shift Swing (Rune Grammofon RCD 2011 • 1999)
- Duck-Rabbit (Rune Grammofon RCD 2020 • 2001)
- Catch That Totem! (1998-2005) (Meletronikk MLK013 • 2005)
- Miniatures (Rune Grammofon RCD 2043 • 2005)
- Amateur (Rune Grammofon RCD 2063 • 2007)
- Unemployed (Rune Grammofon RCD 2116 • 2011)

=== EPs ===
- Islands of Memory (Creaked Records CRDS06 • 2006)

Awards
Preceded by Lars Horntveth	Recipient of the Elektronika Spellemannprisen; 2005	Succeeded by Lindstrøm
