= Store Blåmannen =

Mountain in Troms, Norway

Goardilčohkka (Northern Sami); Store Blåmannen (Norwegian); Blåmannen (Norwegian)
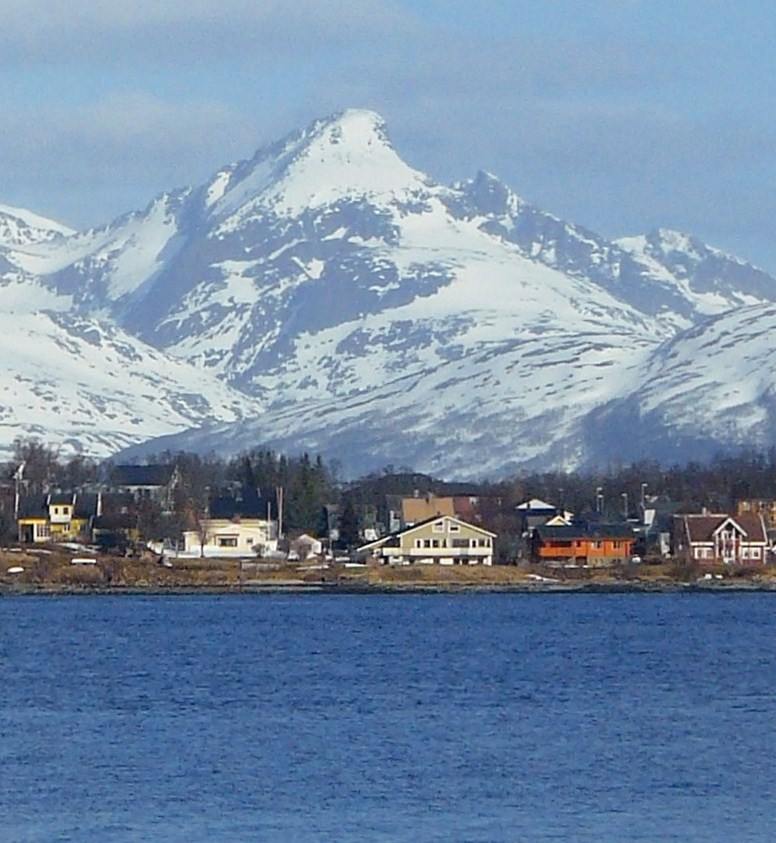
- View of Store Blåmann

Highest point
- Elevation: 1,044 m (3,425 ft)
- Prominence: 1,044 m (3,425 ft)
- Isolation: 24.53 km (15.24 mi) to Bentsjordtinden
- Coordinates: 69.7352°N 18.5919°E

Geography
- Location: Troms, Norway
- Topo map: 1434 II Tussøya

Store Blåmannen (lit. '[the] big negro') or Blåmannen (Norwegian) or Goardilčohkka (Northern Sami) is a mountain in Tromsø Municipality in Troms county, Norway. At 1,044 metres (3,425 ft), it is the highest mountain on the island Kvaløya. It is located on the northwestern part of the island about 16 kilometres (9.9 mi) northwest of the city of Tromsø.

The mountain summit can be accessed without special climbing skills or equipment, but caution is advised on the last part of the climb, which can be difficult in wet conditions.

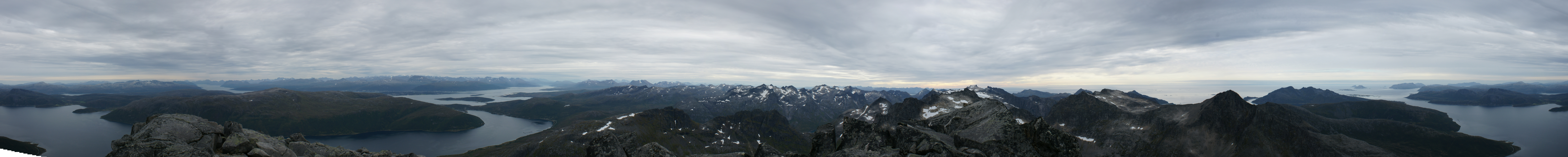
Panorama view from Store Blåmann
