= Kjosen, Tromsø =

Village in Tromsø Municipality, Norway

Kjosen, Tromsø: Kjosen (Norwegian); Muotkevuotna (Northern Sami); Muotkalahti (Kven)
- Village
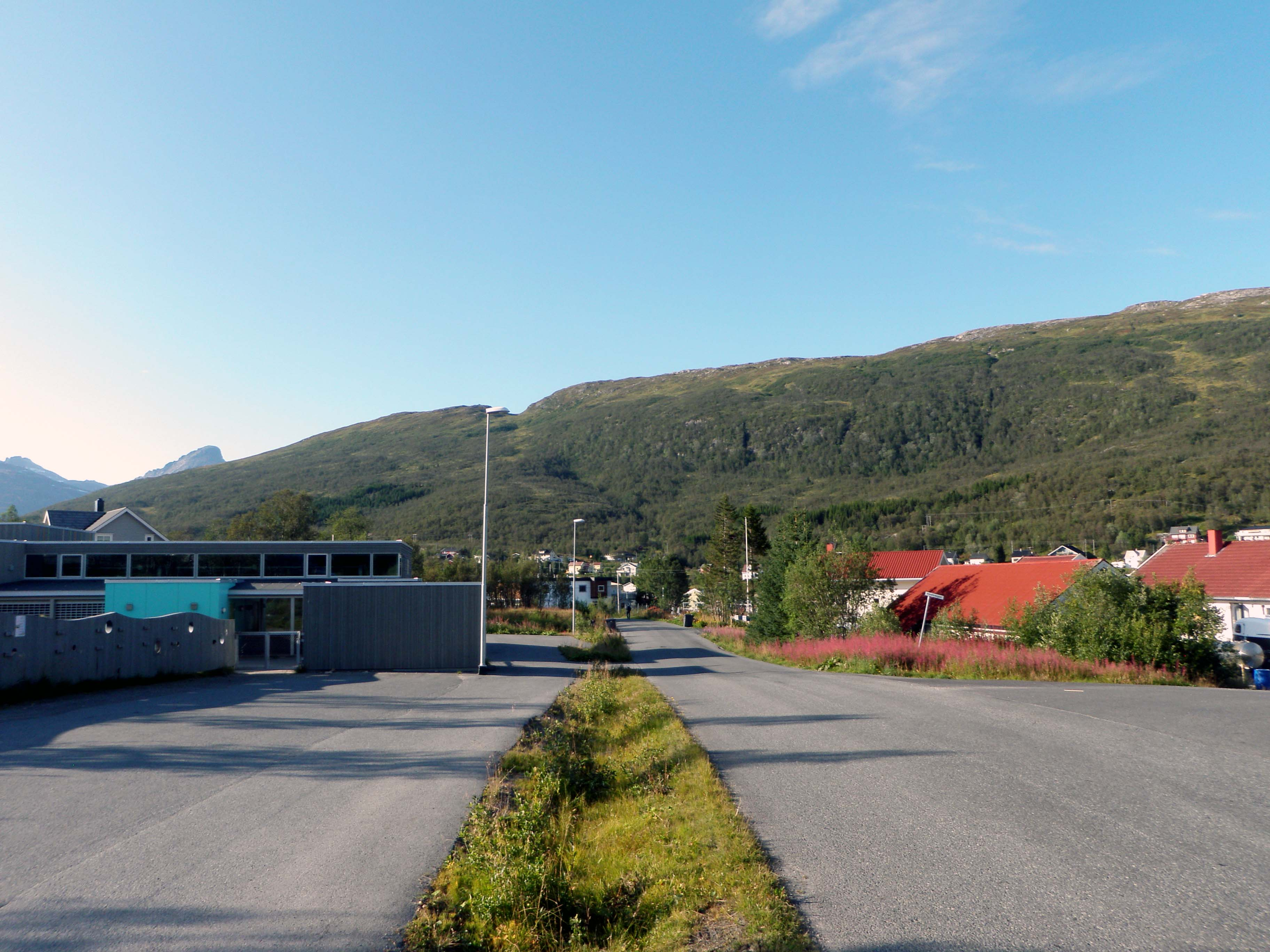
- View of the village
- Interactive map of Kjosen, Tromsø
- Location within Troms Location within Norway
- Coordinates: 69.6864°N 18.7446°E
- Country: Norway
- Region: Northern Norway
- County: Troms
- District: Hålogaland
- Municipality: Tromsø Municipality

Area
  - Total: 0.2 km^{2} (0.077 sq mi)
- Elevation: 5 m (16 ft)

Population (2023)
  - Total: 377
  - Density: 1,885/km^{2} (4,880/sq mi)
- Time zone: UTC+01:00 (CET)
  - Summer (DST): UTC+02:00 (CEST)
- Post Code: 9107 Kvaløya

Kjosen (Norwegian), Muotkevuotna (Northern Sami), or Muotkalahti (Kven) is a village in Tromsø Municipality in Troms county, Norway. The village lies on the island of Kvaløya, about 13 kilometres (8.1 mi) west of the city of Tromsø. It is located at the end of the Kaldfjorden, immediately north of the village of Kaldfjord. The village of Ersfjordbotn lies about 5 kilometres (3.1 mi) to the west and the village of Kvaløysletta lies about 3 kilometres (1.9 mi) to the east.

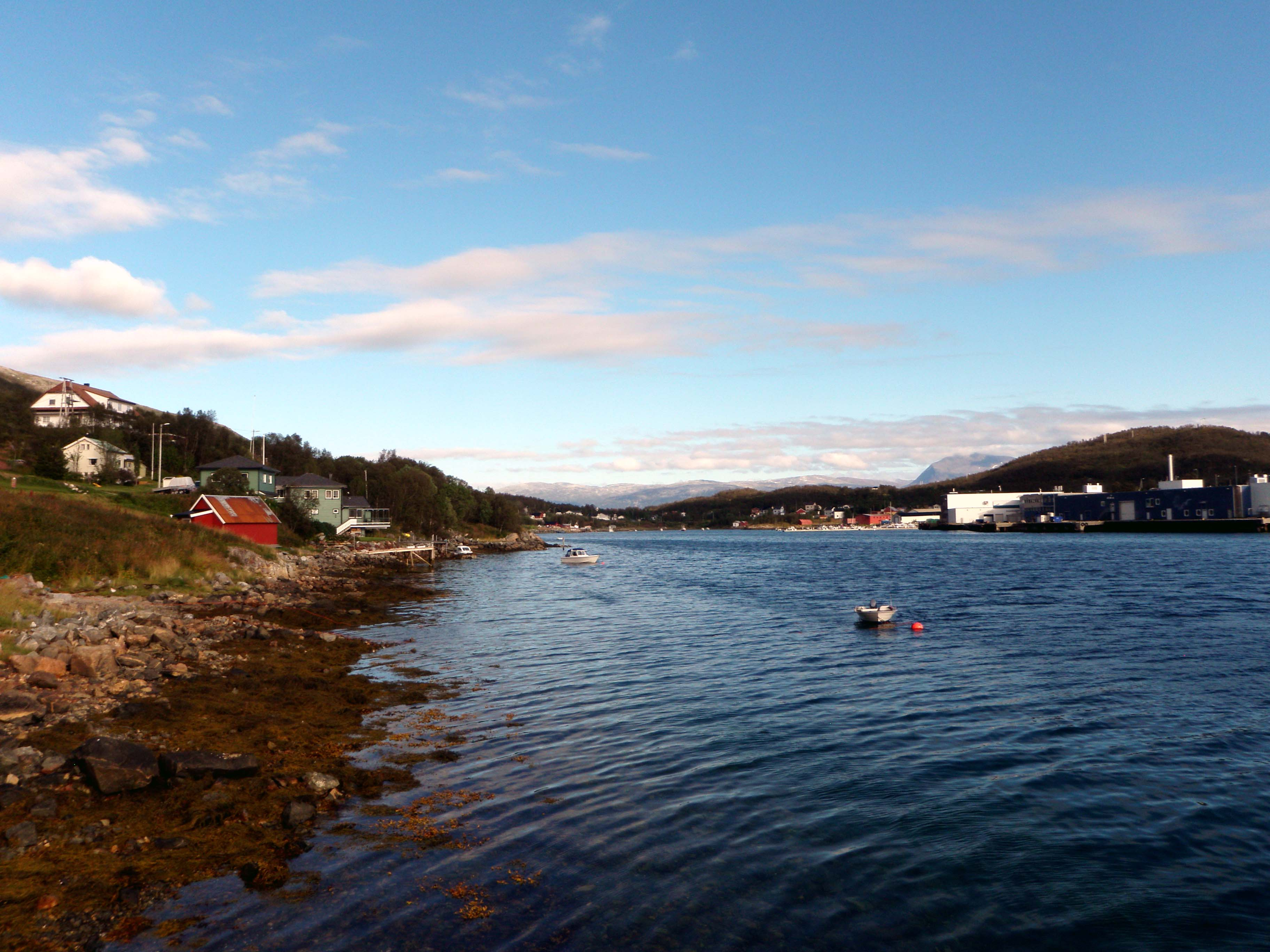
Seaside view of Kjosen

The 0.2-square-kilometre (49-acre) village has a population (2023) of 377 and a population density of 1,885 inhabitants per square kilometre (4,880/sq mi).
