= Men in blue =

Men in blue or Man in Blue, may refer to:

- India national cricket team, commonly known as the Men in Blue
- The Man in Blue (1925 film), a silent drama
- The Man in Blue (1937 film), an American drama
- "Man in Blue IV", a 1954 painting by Francis Bacon

== See also ==
- Bluesmen (disambiguation)
- Blue Men (disambiguation)
- Police, who often wear blue uniform
  - Police officer
- Men in Blues, a band founded by Klaus Heuser
- Man in Blues, a 2003 Hong Kong film
