= Prestvannet =

Lake in Tromsø, Norway

Prestvannet (Norwegian) Báhpajávri (Northern Sami)
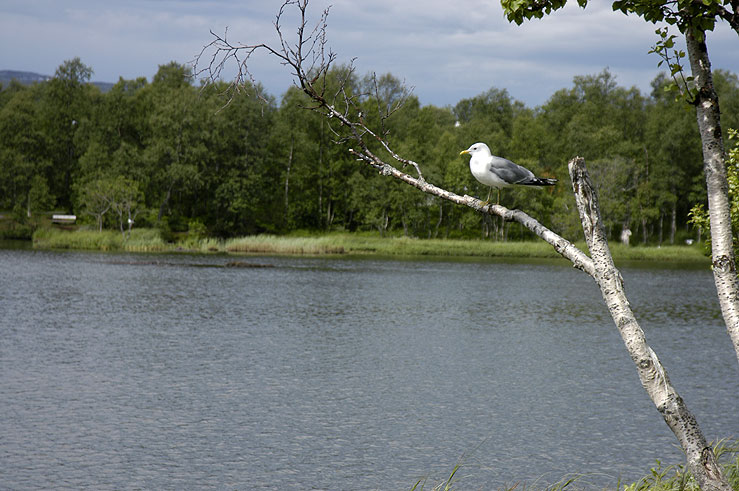
- Interactive map of the lake
- Location: Troms
- Coordinates: 69.6594°N 18.9359°E
- Type: Historic reservoir
- Basin countries: Norway
- Built: 1867
- Max. length: 400 metres (1,300 ft)
- Max. width: 300 metres (980 ft)
- Surface area: 8.1 hectares (20 acres)
- Average depth: 4 metres (13 ft)
- Shore length^{1}: 1.3 kilometres (0.81 mi)
- Surface elevation: 96 metres (315 ft)
- Settlements: Tromsø
- References: NVE
- ^{1} Shore length is not a well-defined measure.

Prestvannet (Norwegian) or Báhpajávri (Northern Sami) is a small lake in Tromsø Municipality in Troms county, Norway. The lake sits at the highest point on the central part of the island of Tromsøya inside the city of Tromsø. Prestvannet was built up as a reservoir in 1867, and continued in that role until 1921. Since then it has been used as park land and a nature reserve.

The pond area has been preserved as a nesting place for various birds. The pond and its surrounding wooded area form an important natural area for the Tromsø area. Encircling the pond is a track commonly used for recreational activities and sports, as well as a nature trail with plaques giving information about the local wildlife. In the winter, the frozen pond is a popular place for ice skating.

== Geography ==
Prestvannet is fully surrounded by Tromsø urban environment. The lake is located in the southern region of Tromsøya, with 96 meter elevation. At its deepest point the lake is four meters deep.

== Ecology ==
Prestvannet is eutrophic and sampling in 2005 found high saturation of phosphorus.

== Media gallery ==
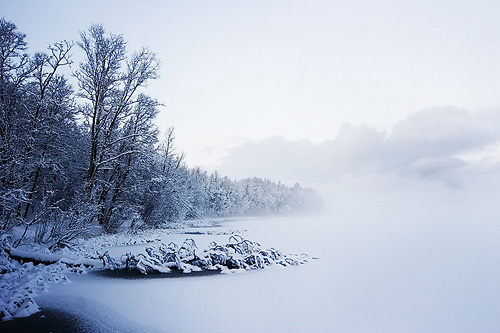
Prestvannet during winter.

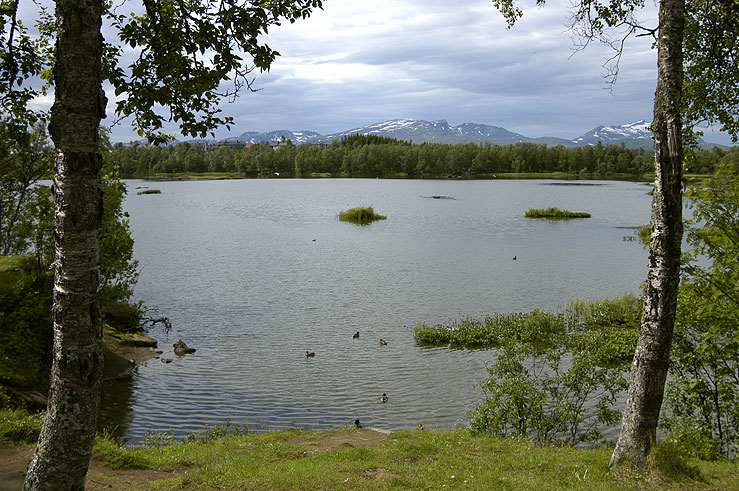
View towards southwest. The tall mountain in the background is Middagstind on Kvaløya.

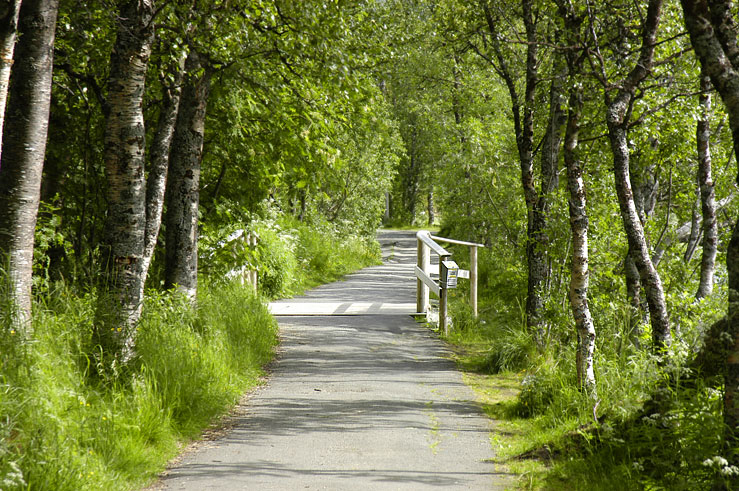
Nature path near Prestvannet

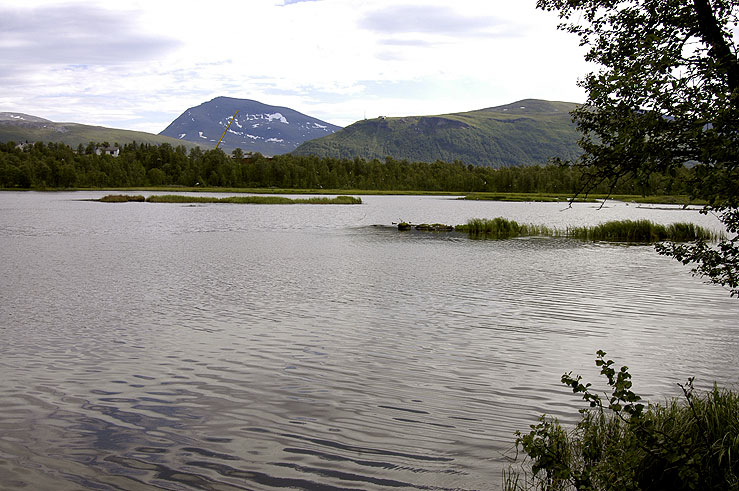
Another view of the lake
