= Bluesmen =

Bluesmen or Bluesman may refer to:

- Bluesman, a blues musician
- "The Blues Man", a song by Alan Jackson from the 1999 album Under the Influence
- Greenville Bluesmen, an American baseball team
- Chicago Bluesmen, an American roller hockey team

== See also ==
- Blue Men (disambiguation)
- Men in blue (disambiguation)
