= Dag-Are Haugan =

Norwegian musician (born 1970)

Dag-Are Haugan (born in 1970) is a Norwegian musician who is part of the Tromsø techno scene.

Dag-Are Haugan was born in Tromsø, a city and municipality in Troms county, Norway. Haugan started playing guitar in his teens and formed several pop bands, for which he was also vocalist. Haugan currently records music with Alog, his musical partnership with fellow Tromsø based musician, Espen Sommer Eide. In 2005, Alog was the winner of the Spellemannprisen, the Norwegian equivalent of the Grammy.

== Musical Releases ==
- Red Shift Swing, Alog (Rune Grammofon RCD 2011 • 1999)
- Duck-Rabbit, Alog (Rune Grammofon RCD 2020 • 2001)
- 9 Solitaires (Kraak 3 K030 • 2002)
- Catch the Totem, Alog (Meletronikk MLK013 • 2005)
- Miniatures, Alog (Rune Grammofon RCD 2043 • 2005)
- Amateur, Alog (Rune Grammofon RCD 2063 • 2007)
