= Kaldfjord =

Village in Tromsø Municipality, Norway

Kaldfjord: Kaldfjord (Norwegian); Gállafierda (Northern Sami)
- Village
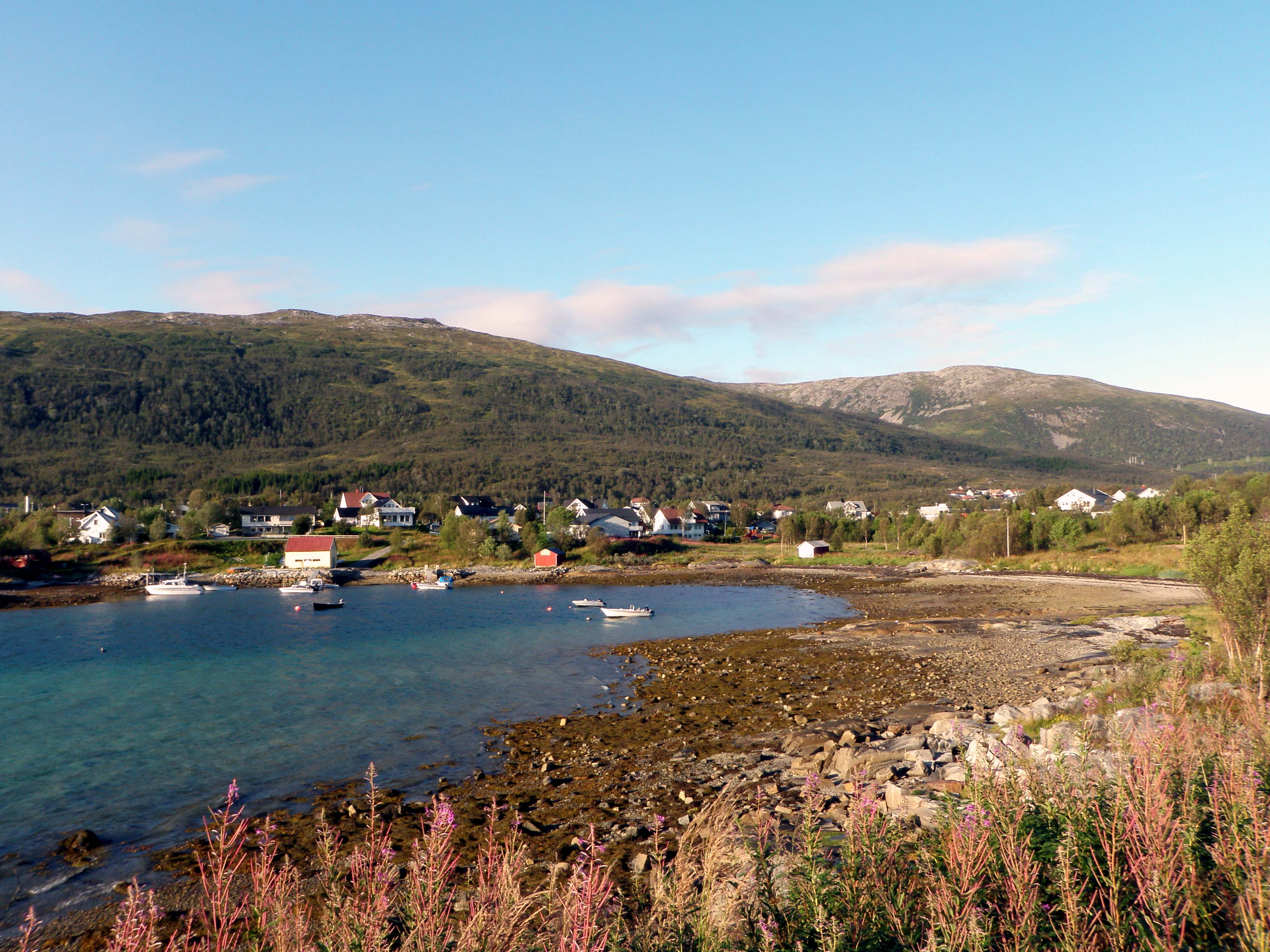
- View of the village
- Interactive map of Kaldfjord
- Location within Troms Location within Norway
- Coordinates: 69°40′55″N 18°44′24″E
- Country: Norway
- Region: Northern Norway
- County: Troms
- District: Midt-Troms
- Municipality: Tromsø Municipality
- Elevation: 22 m (72 ft)
- Time zone: UTC+01:00 (CET)
  - Summer (DST): UTC+02:00 (CEST)
- Post Code: 9107 Kvaløya

Kaldfjord (Norwegian) or Gállafierda (Northern Sami) is a village in Tromsø Municipality in Troms county, Norway. It is located at the southeastern end of the Kaldfjorden on the island of Kvaløya about 10 kilometres (6.2 mi) west of the city of Tromsø. There are several villages located around Kaldfjord including Kjosen, Ersfjordbotn, and Kvaløysletta. Kaldfjord is considered part of the Kvaløysletta urban area.
