= Kvaløysletta =

Village in Tromsø Municipality, Norway

- Neighborhood of the city of Tromsø
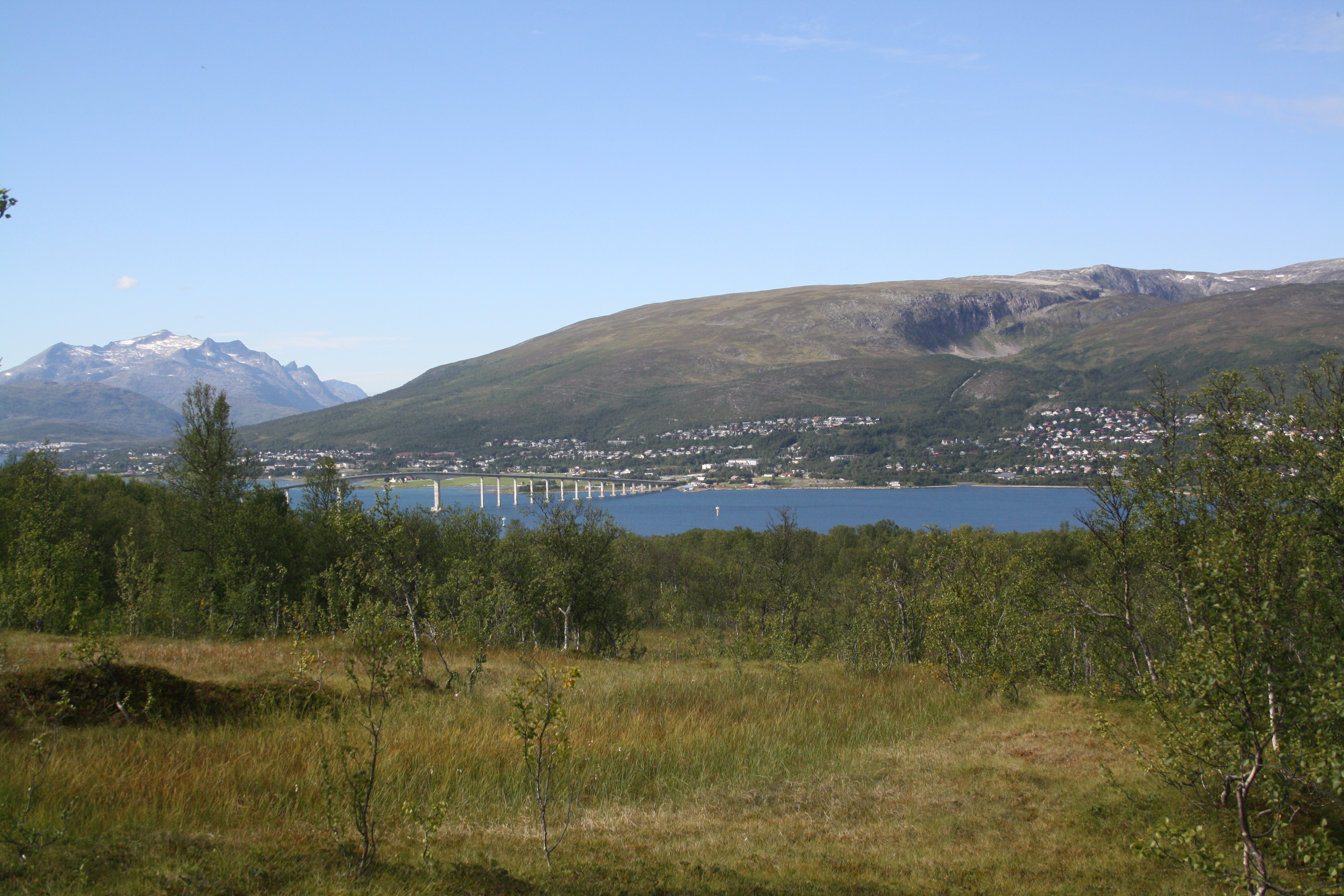
- View of the village
- Interactive map of Kvaløysletta
- Location within Troms Location within Norway
- Coordinates: 69°41′44″N 18°53′01″E
- Country: Norway
- Region: Northern Norway
- County: Troms
- District: Midt-Troms
- Municipality: Tromsø Municipality

Area
  - Total: 3.23 km^{2} (1.25 sq mi)
- Elevation: 5 m (16 ft)

Population (2023)
  - Total: 8,868
  - Density: 2,746/km^{2} (7,110/sq mi)
- Time zone: UTC+01:00 (CET)
  - Summer (DST): UTC+02:00 (CEST)
- Post Code: 9100 Kvaløysletta

Kvaløysletta is an urban neighborhood within the city of Tromsø which is part of Tromsø Municipality in Troms county, Norway. The neighborhood is located on the eastern shore of the island of Kvaløya, about 5 kilometres (3.1 mi) northwest of the city centre of Tromsø. The residential area is located just across the Sandnessund Bridge from the island of Tromsøya where the city centre is located. The 3.23-square-kilometre (800-acre) neighborhood has a population (2023) of 8,868 and a population density of 2,746 inhabitants per square kilometre (7,110/sq mi).

This was a rural area with just a few farms along the shoreline until the opening of the Sandnessund Bridge in 1974. Since then, the area has grown rapidly, and now includes several schools, kindergartens, shops, and restaurants. The built-up areas have now grown so far south-west that it now extends seamlessly into the next settlement, Kaldfjord.
