= Kaldfjorden, Troms =

Fjord in Troms, Norway

Kaldfjorden (Norwegian); Gállafierda (Northern Sami)
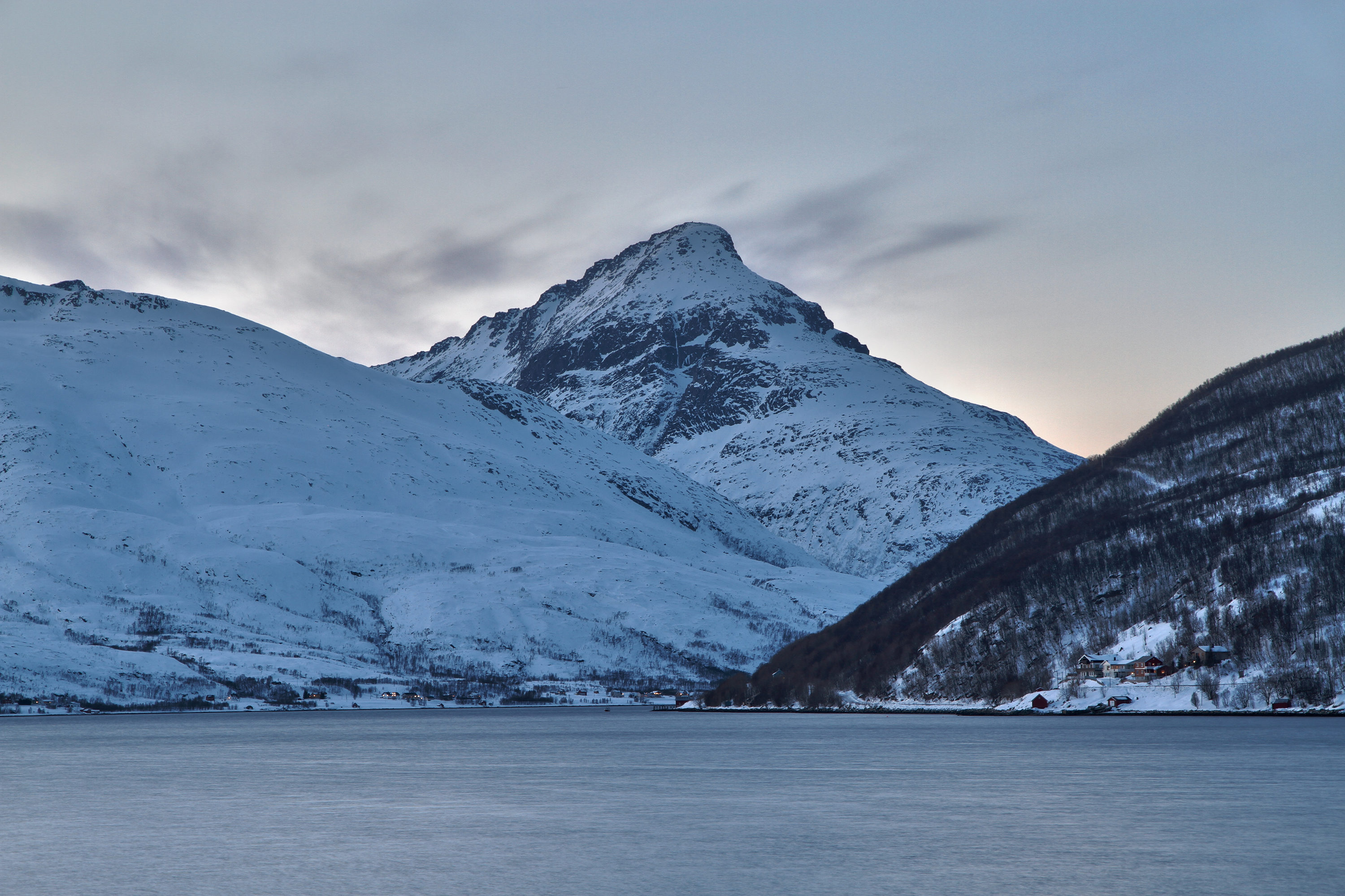
- View of the fjord with Store Blåmann in the background
- Interactive map of the fjord
- Location: Troms county, Norway
- Coordinates: 69.7694°N 18.6821°E
- Type: Fjord
- Basin countries: Norway
- Max. length: 16 kilometres (9.9 mi)
- Max. width: 5 kilometres (3.1 mi)
- Settlements: Kaldfjord, Ersfjordbotn

Kaldfjorden (Norwegian) or Gállafierda (Northern Sami) is a fjord on the northern coast of the island of Kvaløya in Tromsø Municipality in Troms county, Norway. The 16-kilometre (9.9 mi) long fjord stretches from the island of Vengsøya to the village of Kaldfjord. The 1,044-metre (3,425 ft) tall Store Blåmann mountain is located on the eastern shore of the fjord. The fjord cuts the island of Kvaløya nearly in half, leaving a 950-metre (3,120 ft) wide isthmus where the villages of Kaldfjord and Kjosen are partially located. The Norwegian County Road 862 highway runs along the southern shore of the fjord.
