= Espen Sommer Eide =

Norwegian composer and musician

Espen Sommer Eide (born in 1972) is a Norwegian composer and musician.

Espen Sommer Eide was born in Oslo, Norway. Espen played music originally on percussion instruments, flutes and trumpet, before emphasising computer-generated sounds. He lives in Bergen, Norway where he is involved in the city's experimental music scene. Eide has released several solo albums as Phonophani, under the Rune Grammofon record label. Phonophani is multi-instrumentalist and digital electronics music, characterized by various manipulated live instruments integrated with pure electronic sounds.

Espen Sommer Eide is the developer of the Concertinome, a custom made instrument combining the concertina accordion with the monome style keyboard and electronic air pressure sensors. It was made by Eide during 2009 and demonstrated in a concert at Visningsrommet USF, an experimental and non-commercial gallery at the Bergen National Academy of the Arts.

Eide also records music with Alog, his musical partnership with fellow Norwegian musician, Dag-Are Haugan. In 2005, Alog was the winner of the Spellemannprisen, the Norwegian equivalent of the Grammy. In 2007, Alog was nominated for a Spellemannprisen for the album Amateur.

== Musical Releases ==
- Phonophani, Phonophani (Biophon Records BIO 1 CD • 1998 / Rune Grammofon RCD 2054 • 2006)
- Red Shift Swing, Alog (Rune Grammofon RCD 2011 • 1999)
- Duck-Rabbit, Alog (Rune Grammofon RCD 2020 • 2001)
- Genetic Engineering, Phonophani (Rune Grammofon RCD 2016 • 2001)
- Oak or Rock, Phonophani (Rune Grammofon RCD 2038 • 2004)
- Catch That Totem! (1998-2005), Alog (Meletronikk MLK013 • 2005)
- Miniatures, Alog (Rune Grammofon RCD 2043 • 2005)
- Amateur, Alog (Rune Grammofon RCD 2063 • 2007)
- Kreken, Phonophani (Rune Grammofon RCD 2101 • 2010)
- Unemployed, Alog (Rune Grammofon RCD 2116 • 2011)
- Weathering, Kvien & Sommer (Full Of Nothing fon48 • 2015)
- Animal Imagination, Phonophani (Hubro HUBROLP3589 • 2017)
- The Waves, Espen Sommer Eide (Sofa SOFA578 • 2019)
