= Blámaðr =

Swedish term for a dark-skinned person

Blámaðr, meaning 'blue man' in Old Norse (Old Swedish: blaman, Early Modern Swedish: blåman), was the Nordic designation for dark-skinned people during the Viking Age and into the early modern period, as the color black initially was on the blue spectrum in Old Norse. Bláland, meaning 'blue land' in Old Norse (Modern Swedish Blåland), was likewise the analog name for Africa, or specifically North Africa.

The Ynglinga saga, the first saga in Heimskringla, an Old Norse collection of Kings' sagas, written down around 1230 in Iceland, mentions both “Blue land” and “blue men”. A quote goes: “þar eru blámenn” (over there are blue men). The usage of the word continued throughout the Middle Ages and beyond. It was, for instance, used in the Gustav Vasa Bible from 1541.

In the Norrmalm district of Stockholm, there is a city block named Kvarteret Blåmannen ('Blue Man Quarter').
