= Kino-Eye =

Film technique invented in the Soviet Union

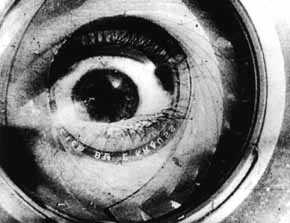
Still from Man with a Movie Camera (1929)

Kino-Eye (also Kino-glaz, from Russian: Кино-глаз; Anglophonic: Cine-Eye) is a film technique developed in Soviet Union by Dziga Vertov. It was also the name of the movement and group that was defined by this technique. Kino-Eye was Vertov's means of capturing what he believed to be "inaccessible to the human eye"; that is, Kino-Eye films would not attempt to imitate how the human eye saw things. Rather, by assembling film fragments and editing them together in a form of montage, Kino-Eye hoped to activate a new type of perception by creating "a new filmic, i.e., media shaped, reality and a message or an illusion of a message - a semantic field." Distinct from narrative entertainment cinema forms or otherwise "acted" films, Kino-Eye sought to capture "life unawares" and edit it together in such a way that it would form a new, previously unseen truth.

== History ==
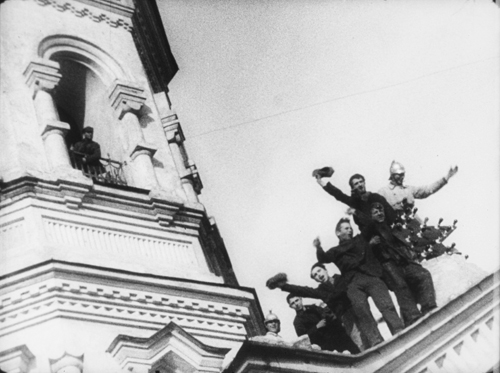
A shot from Enthusiasm (1931)

In the early 1920s, cinema emerged as a central medium of artistic expression in the Soviet Union. The relatively new form was celebrated as the tool of a new social order by revolutionary leaders like Lenin and Trotsky. However, by the mid-1920s, as Richard Taylor writes, "The conventional structures of the cinema industry in its three major aspects - production, distribution, and exhibition - had been shattered by the Civil War." Because of the resulting shortage of equipment and other resources, much of the footage shot in Russia in the 1920s was actually used for more "necessary" forms of film such as the newsreel. In fact, the vast majority of "entertainment" films shown in the 1920s were imported from Hollywood, and it was not until 1927 that Soviet-made films outsold imported films in the box office.

Kino-Eye developed as a response to what was happening in much of Soviet cinema at the time Vertov entered the playing field. He wanted a revolutionary form, a form that could represent truth in the way he believed most "acted" films did not. Vertov credited American action films as the first form to harness cinema's incredible dynamism and the use of the close-up, but wanted to explore these forms even more deeply with Kino-Eye. While the new technique of montage and its proponents like Kuleshov and Eisenstein had begun to change the landscape of Soviet film, Vertov's Kino-Eye found popularity in their universality. Jay Leyda writes:

"While most films produced at that time approached revolutionary subject-matter with attitudes strongly influenced by the cheapest theatrical and adventure-film traditions, both in selection and in method, Vertov's films dared to treat the present and, through the present, the future, with an approach as revolutionary as the material he treated."

In fact, Kino-Eye was based more fundamentally on the techniques of the newsreel than on montage or any entertainment-filmmaking process. Over a decade after the Civil War in 1939, Vertov wrote:

"Comrades, masters of Soviet cinema! ... One thing... seems strange and incomprehensible to me. Why is the era of the Civil War missing from your remembrances? It was then, after all, that a very large area of Soviet cinema was born in joyful labor. And from 1918 on, after all, we studied film writing, or how to write with a camera... At that time I specialized in factual film writing. I tried to become a newsreel film writer."

In many ways, Kino-Eye resulted from newsreels and styles of Bolshevik journalism. Jeremy Hicks writes that the Bolsheviks had long espoused the newspaper as the main source of fact and truth. Vertov's cinematic form was a direct response to the truth that he found in journalism and its representations of everyday life. He hoped for Kino-Eye to capture cinematic truth.

== Technique ==
Like many of its contemporaneous art forms, Kino-Eye was an attempt to model objectivity amid the contradictions of Soviet modernity. The Kino-Eye was Vertov's solution to what he saw as the diluted nature of "propagandistic-artistic" Soviet film. He thought of film as "dynamic geometry," and therefore Kino-Eye would exploit dynamism in geometric space in a way that the eye could not. By manipulating the camera to exploit movement along with new editing techniques that focused on film speed and transitions, Kino-Eye would construct a new, objective depiction of reality. In 1923, Vertov wrote:

"I am kino-eye, I am a mechanical eye. I, a machine, show you the world as only I can see it. Now and forever, I free myself from human immobility, I am in constant motion, I draw near, then away from objects, I crawl under, I climb onto them... Now I, a camera, fling myself along their resultant, maneuvering in the chaos of movement, recording movement, starting with movements composed of the most complex combinations... My path leads to the creation of a fresh perception of the world. I decipher in a new way a world unknown to you."

Kino-Eye was also a reaction to overly "acted" films that Vertov despised. It was positioned diametrically opposite what the kinoks thought of as "staged" film. They wanted to capture "real life," which they believed could only be achieved through the objectivity of Kino-Eye. The kinoks held that actors could only ever produce "pseudorealism" through a scripted film. In a 1929 note on the "History of the Kinoks," Vertov wrote:

"I don't know who's opposed to whom. It's difficult to stand up against the cinema that is acted. It represents 98 percent of our world production. We simply feel that the cinema's chief function is the recording of documents, of facts, the recording of life, of historical processes. Acted cinema is a replacement for theater, it is theater restored. A compromise tendency still exists, directed toward the fusion or blending of the two. We take a stand against all that."

The goal of a non-staged, was the expansion of the cinematic field of vision, and thereby of the potential truth of that vision. It became largely recognized, as members of the film community could not help but recognize the success of works like Man with a Movie Camera. Author Osip Brik espoused Kino-Eye as a model for all Soviet film production. Vertov also hoped that Kino-Eye would make cinema more intelligible to the common people, so that it could truly become a mass media form.

There has been much debate over whether Kino-Eye was intended as an epistemological form, an emancipatory form, or even a scientific form. Hicks writes about Kino-Eye as an early expression of documentary, as Vertov's films were not staged and captured "real life" in order to create "tremendous rhetorical force." The delineation between "fiction" and "nonfiction" in film had not yet been clearly marked in the cinema as a new form of meaning-making. Crucially for Vertov, Kino-Eye allowed the meaning to be in the hands of the viewer, not the script.

=== Kinochestvo ===
Kinochestvo was the main cinematographic mechanism of Kino-Eye. In his writings, Vertov chastised contemporary cinematography as being too concerned with elements outside of the film shot itself, such as music or literature. Contrary to traditional film-making techniques, Kino-Eye, through Kinochestvo, was interested in the "non-theatrical" film, that is, in films without script or composite characters, that would simply capture life "unawares," or as it really was. Kinochestvo would capture the non-acted film in order to produce a "truthful" depiction of life for cinema.

== Kinoks ==
A shot from Three Songs of Lenin (1934)

Vertov and his followers that took up Kino-Eye as their method of film production referred to themselves as kinoks ("cinema-eye men") rather than "cinematographers." The kinoks wanted to "replace verbal debate, as a literary phenomenon, with film debate, that is, with the making of film-objects." Explode the barrier between the artistic film and the newsreel. The kinoks organized themselves in the same way the Soviets did - headed by the "Council of Three" (Vertov and two others), the rest were thought of as comrades in film-making. They celebrated their difference from traditional film-makers. Addressing his contemporary cinematographers, Vertov wrote, "However insignificant our practical achievement, nevertheless it's more than your years of nothing."

The kinoks believed that through their method of Kino-Eye they were "keeping stride with the worldwide proletarian revolution." Their mission was to reveal the mysteries of life to the masses through their films. Their form was deeply tied to Soviet socialism, as they wanted to make cinema available to a working class audience. Still, the kinoks were not met with universal welcome. Eisenstein chastised them as wanting "to remove cinema from the ranks of the arts at all costs." Because of their highly experimental nature, the kinoks' films rarely became hits. Several films did gain national and even international recognition, such as Vertov's Three Songs of Lenin and Enthusiasm.

== Man with a Movie Camera ==
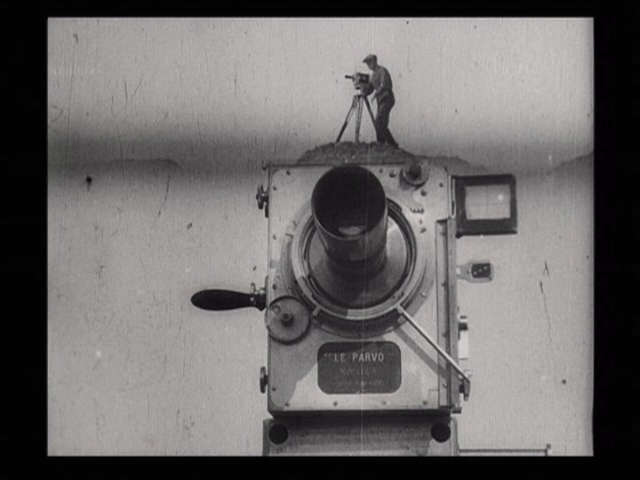
An image from Man with a Movie Camera (1929)

Largely considered Vertov's lone masterpiece, Man with a Movie Camera is the greatest example of Kino-Eye. According to Vertov, it required more work than his previous Kino-Eye films because of its complexity in both filming and editing. Without words or titles, it relies solely on the visual language of film to tell its story, departing wholly from the languages of theatre and literature that the kinoks believed had infiltrated cinema. Vertov thought of the film as the culmination of his previous Kino-Eye features, writing:

"The film Man with a Movie Camera represents AN EXPERIMENT IN THE CINEMATIC TRANSMISSION of visual phenomena WITHOUT THE HELP OF INTERTITLES (a film without intertitles) WITHOUT THE HELP OF A SCRIPT (a film without a script) WITHOUT THE HELP OF THE THEATRE (a film without actors, without sets, etc.). This new experimental work by Kino-Eye is directed towards the creation of an authentically international absolute language of cinema - ABSOLUTE KINOGRAPHY - on the basis of its complete separation from the language of theatre and literature."

Unashamedly avant-garde, Man with a Movie Camera captures every day actions such as getting out of bed, washing, and even giving birth. It is in the editing and cutting together of these fragments that meaning is made. Hicks writes, "In its very form Man with a Movie Camera is a defence of documentary. For Vertov, however, the defence of documentary was inextricable from the defence of the integrity of cinema itself, since documentary was its purest, least theatrical form." To Vertov, the film was his fullest physical manifestation of the theory of Kino-Eye. Responding to critics and those trying to intellectualize the film, he wrote, "In fact, the film is only the sum of the facts recorded on film." This simplicity and goal of objectivity is the foundation of Kino-Eye.
