= Kino-Eye (film) =

1924 Soviet documentary film

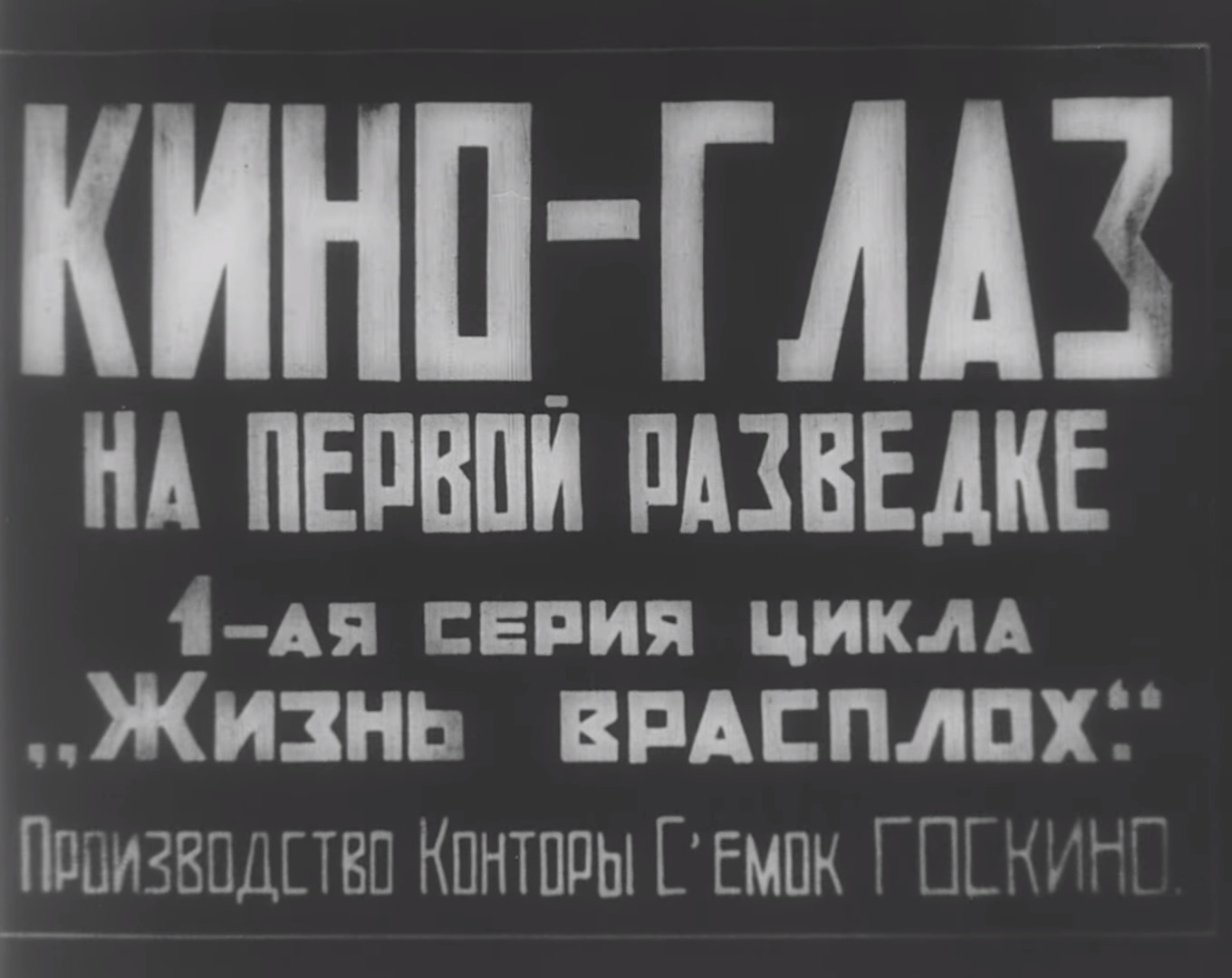
- Kino-Eye's title card
- Russian: Кино-глаз
- Directed by: Dziga Vertov
- Cinematography: Mikhail Kaufman
- Edited by: Yelizaveta Svilova
- Production company: Goskino USSR
- Release date: 31 October 1924 (Moscow)
- Running time: 79 minutes
- Country: Soviet Union
- Languages: Silent film Russian intertitles

Kino-Eye (Russian: Кино-глаз, romanized: Kino-glaz) is a 1924 Soviet silent documentary film directed by Dziga Vertov and shot by cinematographer Mikhail Kaufman. This experimental film, which laid the groundwork for Vertov's principles of documentary filmmaking, received mixed reviews from critics and film scholars.

== Synopsis ==
The film consists of a series of short episodes, each preceded by a title card. The first segment, titled "On a Church Holiday, or The Effect of Moonshine on Village Women", is a sketch depicting a spontaneous folk celebration with dancing to the sound of an accordion. The next two episodes—"Among the Village Pioneers" and "Among the City Pioneers"—tell the story of how school-age children participate in promoting the cooperative movement: they visit markets, compare food prices between independent merchants and cooperative members, and post signs reading "Don't let merchants profit—buy from the cooperative!"

The short segment "Morning at Camp" introduces viewers to the daily life of the Pioneers: they live in tents, wash in the river, and prepare their own breakfast. There, in the open air, a barbershop has been set up for the villagers, as well as a soldering workshop where the boys repair household items brought in by the farmers. Another episode shows how the camp was built and opened. Stories about the lives of the Pioneers alternate with vignettes that are thematically unrelated—in one of them, Chinese magician Chang-Gi-Wan performs tricks with dishes and wire right on the street; in another, the filmmakers repeatedly reenact a dive from a platform, using captions to highlight the athlete's technique.

== Production ==
While preparing the proposal for Kino-Eye, Dziga Vertov wrote that it would be the world's first film shot without actors, costume designers, set designers, or makeup artists; as a director, he would not need studio soundstages or sets, because the film's characters would exist in real life. Attached to the draft memorandum addressed to the State Committee for Cinematography was a list of the film crew, which included a cameraman, a mail carrier, a criminal investigator, medical personnel, firefighters, and a cyclist; in addition, a list of locations where filming was planned was submitted (a pioneer camp, a bakery, a sports field, a steamboat, a cemetery, etc.). The first list was titled "Instead of Actors", and the second was titled "Instead of a Studio". Vertov had envisioned Kino-Eye as a six-part documentary series, but he managed to film only the first episode—"Life Taken by Surprise".

In 1923, four members of the film crew arrived in the village of Pavlovskoye. The filmmakers were drawn to this area not only because of the picturesque landscapes of the Istra, but also because one of the first Young Pioneer camps in the USSR was located on the riverbank. After inviting local residents to the village school, the "kinoki" (as the filmmakers called themselves) explained that people with film cameras would be working in and around Pavlovskoye, and asked for their full cooperation. It was there that a young Ilya Kopalin met the cinematographers, became a student of Vertov and dedicated his life to documentary film.

Vertov's crew stayed in Pavlovskoye and traveled to the pioneer camp every morning. The filmmakers urged children and adults alike not to pay any attention to them; the filming took place in a natural setting, without any staged scenes. The film, widely regarded as experimental and shot in accordance with Dziga Vertov's theory of "life caught unawares", was released in 1924.

== Style and themes ==
Kino-Eye

One of Dziga Vertov's techniques, first articulated in Kino-Eye and later realised in the film Man with a Movie Camera, was the compositional arrangement of scenes according to the laws of poetry. He rejected a rigid chronological order of scenes and rearranged them according to his own ideas about rhythm and imagery.

Kino-Eye is filled with metaphors created through the principle of association. For example, the episode depicting the journey of bread in reverse (a finished loaf in the bakery transforms first into dough, then into rye ears), as well as the episode about the "return" of a bull's carcass to an animal grazing in a meadow, are intended to show that things and products are produced by humans, to whom everything ultimately returns. Vertov himself explained the scenes of the bull's "resurrection" and the reversal of time as follows:

This film represents an assault on our reality by the cinema and, against a backdrop of class and everyday contradictions, sets the stage for the theme of all-creating labour. By revealing the origins of things and bread, the camera allows every worker to see for themselves that they, the workers, make all things themselves, and therefore, these things belong to them.

Researchers have noted a particular shot from Kino-Eye in which the camera angle is shifted, causing a Moscow street to appear as if lying on its side. The shot was taken by cinematographer Mikhail Kaufman in accordance with the avant-garde principles of the 1920s, when revolutionary experiments with film and photography were welcomed. Such fragments, created to "revolutionise visual thinking", were characteristic of the founder of constructivism, Alexander Rodchenko, with whom Vertov and Kaufman were friends—all three were closely associated with the Left Front of the Arts. The innovative nature of Kino-Eye was generally regarded as intriguing, although film scholars, even decades after the film's release, noted the lack of internal logic in the editing of scenes and Vertov and Kaufman's tendency toward gratuitous effects.

== Reception ==
The first public screening of Kino-Eye took place in 1924 at the Khudozhestvenny cinema in Moscow. The premiere attracted considerable interest from Vertov's colleagues—the audience included representatives of the film community and many writers; residents of the village of Pavlovskoye were also in attendance. After the screening, a heated discussion ensued: critics of Vertov's concept of documentary filmmaking failed to grasp the director's message; speakers argued that the film stock provided for the shoot had been wasted.

An article in Pravda (15 October 1924), written by the music critic Boris Gusman, served as a unique response to Vertov's opponents and the supporters of narrative films. In particular, it stated that once Kino-Eye was finalised, the country would have "the first successful film" that could be shown to workers and peasants: "There are moments here that, for the first time... vividly demonstrate the connection between the city and the countryside." In another article, Gusman argued that Vertov's desire to immerse himself in the heart of life and depict it "without transformation or staging" deserved support. However, Gusman also acknowledged that the episodes of Kino-Eye lack a unifying thread; the storylines are disjointed and unrelated, which he said can cause the viewer's attention to wander.

The film won an award at the International Exhibition in Paris in 1925.

In the early 1970s, the Anthology Film Archives selected Kino-Eye for its collection of essential cinema.

== Bibliography ==
- Borisova, O. S. (2015). "Критические размышления о методологических моделях визуальных исследований" [Critical Reflections on Methodological Models in Visual Studies]. Наука. Искусство. Культура (in Russian). 2 (6): 142–148.
- Drobashenko, S. (1966). Дзига Вертов. Статьи. Дневники. Замыслы [Dziga Vertov. Articles. Diaries. Concepts] (in Russian). Moscow: Iskusstvo. OCLC 56678676.
- Novikova, Assa (22 January 2015). "Детский мир" [Children's World]. Iskusstvo Kino (in Russian). Archived from the original on 29 November 2018.
- Svilova, E. I.; Vinogradova, A. L. (1976). Дзига Вертов в воспоминаниях современников [Dziga Vertov as Remembered by His Contemporaries] (in Russian). Moscow: Iskusstvo. OCLC 265906288.
- Tsivyan, Yuri (2008). "Жест революции, или Шкловский как путаник". Novoe literaturnoe obozrenie (in Russian) (92). Archived from the original on 12 June 2019.
- Vladimirtseva, I. N.; Sandler, A. M. (1969). История советского кино в четырёх томах [A History of Soviet Cinema in Four Volumes] (in Russian). Vol. 1. Moscow: Iskusstvo. OCLC 917473674.
