= List of Soviet films of 1937 =

A list of films produced in the Soviet Union in 1937 (see 1937 in film).

== 1937 ==
Title	Russian title	Director	Cast	Genre	Notes
1937
The Ballad of Cossack Golota	Дума про казака Голоту	Igor Savchenko	Konstantin Nassonov	Drama	
Bezhin Meadow	Бежин луг	Sergei Eisenstein	Vitya Kartashov, Nikolai Khmelyov	Drama	Lost film
The Defense of Volotchayevsk	Волочаевские дни	Vasilyev brothers	Varvara Myasnikova	Drama	
In Memory of Sergo Ordzhonikidze	Памяти Серго Орджоникидзе	Dziga Vertov		Documentary	
Lenin in October	Ленин в Октябре	Mikhail Romm, Dmitriy Vasilev	Boris Shchukin, Nikolai Okhlopkov, Vasili Vanin	Biopic	
The Lonely White Sail	Белеет парус одинокий	Vladimir Legoshin	Igor But	Adventure	
Lullaby	Колыбельная	Dziga Vertov		Documentary	
Marriage	Женитьба	Erast Garin	Erast Garin	Comedy	
The Miners	Шахтёры	Sergei Yutkevich	Boris Poslavsky	Drama	
Peter the Great	Пётр Первый	Vladimir Petrov	Nikolay Simonov, Nikolay Cherkasov, Alla Tarasova, Mikhail Zharov, Viktor Dobrovolsky	Biopic	
Pugachev	Пугачёв	Pavel Petrov-Bytov	Konstantin Skorobogatov	Drama	
The Return of Maxim	Возвращение Максима	Grigori Kozintsev, Leonid Trauberg	Boris Chirkov	Drama	
Without a Dowry	Бесприданница	Yakov Protazanov	Nina Alisova	Drama	
Young Pushkin	Юность поэта	Abram Naroditsky	Valentin Litovsky	Biopic	

== See also ==
- 1937 in the Soviet Union
