= A Sixth Part of the World =

1926 silent film by Dziga Vertov

- Directed by: Dziga Vertov
- Written by: Dziga Vertov
- Produced by: Kultkino, Sovkino
- Cinematography: Mikhail Kaufman
- Edited by: Elizaveta Svilova, Dziga Vertov
- Distributed by: Sovkino
- Release date: 31 December 1926; (USSR)
- Running time: 73 minutes
- Country: Soviet Union
- Languages: Silent film Russian intertitles
- Budget: SUR 80 000

A Sixth Part of the World (Russian: «Шестая часть мира», romanized: Shestaya Chast Mira) is a 1926 silent film directed by Dziga Vertov and produced by Kultkino (part of Sovkino). Through the travelogue format, it depicted the multitude of Soviet peoples in remote areas of USSR and detailed the entirety of the wealth of the Soviet land. Focusing on cultural and economic diversity, the film is in fact a call for unification in order to build a "complete socialist society".

A mix between newsreel and found footage, Vertov edited sequences filmed by eight teams of kinoks (kinoki) during their trips. According to Vertov, the film anticipates the coming of sound films by using a constant "word-radio-theme" in the intertitles. Thanks to A Sixth Part of the World and his following feature The Eleventh Year (1928), Vertov matures his style in which he will excel in his most famous film Man with a Movie Camera (1929).

== Plot ==
A Sixth Part of the World (1926)

Vertov starts by showing us, with intertitles in giant Cyrillic characters, what he sees (Вижу) about the capitalist West with its foxtrot and black minstrels, and then switches his attention to the audience (Вы) and then the individual viewer (Ты). In one self-reflective moment, Vertov even shows cinema-goers watching an earlier piece of the film (‘And you sitting in the audience’).

He takes the viewer on a tour of the vital importance of agricultural production, which generates export revenue (shot of the ship’s nameplate Greenwich) so that Russia can buy machines to build more machines (shots of a milling machine). This gives him the pretext to take a Cook’s tour of the extremities of the Soviet Union, showing the Lenin (shot downwards from above the prow) delivering new dogs to the Samoyeds on Novaya Zemlya and their being invited on board to listen to a gramophone recording of Vladimir Lenin himself. Then the film shows Bukhara where one of the mosques is looking very dingy and crumbled, and to Leningrad where trams run down the middle of broad empty boulevard as a horse-drawn carriage turns out. Next are shown a Kirghiz with a giant eagle perched on his arm, a bear encircled by yapping dogs, a fox caught in a trap and another one that is a child’s pet, guillemots, gulls, a man shooting a sable in the top of a pine tree, a pine marten, sheep being dragged into the sea for a wash and other sheep being obliged to jump into a stream for the same purpose - the intertitles are surreal: 'You – whether you are washing your sheep in the sea (film) or whether you are washing your sheep in the river (film)...' Then trappers are shown bringing their furs to the Госторг (Gostorg) trading post in exchange for manufactured goods, everyone contributing to the national economy. The furs are destined for the Leipzig fair (ярмарка). In a stop-frame sequence, rows of oranges align themselves in a packing box, wadges of packing material shuffle along and jump on top of them, and then the lids close (the line pulling one of the sides is just visible). Coke is shown being quenched, as well as electricity pylons and insulators, and the village electricity co-op. Sturgeon are lifted out of tanks to make caviar. Next are shown barrels of butter – 'it is yours!' Wheat is threshed, linen is spun and cotton is ginned. The country is being modernised, although there are still some people who trust in Mohammed (film) or Christ (a man telling his rosary) or Buddha (film) and there is a Siberian shaman looking remarkably like a North American Indian, and even a reindeer being slaughtered (by axe blows to the neck) as a sacrifice. The film shows crowds of women in full-face veils, but also a modernising country as a woman lifts her veil. Then there are some tundra-dwellers eating raw reindeer meat.

It is a travelogue and anthropological document. Lenin’s Mausoleum is his alone at this time (1926). The moral: everyone produces and is building socialism. It starts with slavery and ends with developing countries joining the socialist revolution.

== Vertov's intentions ==
In an interview for Kino magazine in August 1926, Vertov explained his intentions: "A Sixth Part of the World is more than a film, than what we have got used to understanding by the word ‘film’. Whether it is a newsreel, a comedy, an artistic hit-film, A Sixth Part of the World is somewhere beyond the boundaries of these definitions; it is already the next stage after the concept of ‘cinema’ itself... Our slogan is: 'All citizens of the Union of Soviet Socialist Republics from 10 to 100 years old must see this work. By the tenth anniversary of October there must not be a single Tungus who has not seen A Sixth Part of the World” (quoted in Barbara Wurm's essay in the DVD booklet).

== Production ==
At the beginning of 1918, Dziga Vertov was hired to edit the newsreel Kinonedelia ("Cineweek") for the Moscow Cinema Committee. With no formal education in the science of editing, he learnt to build a coherent newsreel with a minimum of stock. Practising editing on different kinds of short movies, Vertov began to theorize his own view on editing. In the hope of putting his theories into practice, in 1922 he formed the first group of kinoki ("cine-eyes") in which he began to issue the Kinopravda ("Cine-truth") serie of films. At that time, Vertov published essays in specialized publications detailing his theories on cinema. In 1924, the Goskino film production company set up a documentary section called Kultkino and Vertov was placed in charge. That year, Goskino was replaced by Sovkino, which continue to operate the Kultkino section. In 1925, Gostorg, the Central State Trading Organisation, was seeking a director for a film promoting internal trade and praising the merits of the new social order. A Sixth Part of the World was produced by Kultkino within Sovkino.

== Reception ==
The film was well received by Pravda. Praising the film, the periodical Sovetskii Ekran ("Soviet Screen") stated: "These films reveal to us that Russian cinematography has found the correct path". However, prominent critics criticized it. Critic Viktor Shklovsky accused the film of being fiction in his article "The Cine-Eyes and Intertitles". According to critic Ippolit Sokolov, the movie is a "deformation of facts done by montage". The film remained mostly unexploited by official propaganda and Vertov was expelled from Sovkino production in 1927, being accused of exceeding more than three times the initial budget of 40,000 roubles (the film actually cost twice this budget).

In the early 1970s, the Anthology Film Archives selected A Sixth Part of the World for its collection of essential cinema.

== DVD release ==
Editions Filmmuseum released the film in 2009 in a 2-disc set with the film The Eleventh Year (1928). Both films have accompanying compositions by Michael Nyman.

=== Other soundtracks ===
In 2015, the Belgian post-rock band We Stood Like Kings, specialized in writing new soundtracks for silent movies, released its own new live score USSR 1926 for the film on the German label Kapitän Platte.
