= Fall of Berlin =

Fall of Berlin may refer to

- Fall of Berlin (1806), in 1806 French forces captured Berlin during the Napoleonic Wars
- Battle of Berlin (1945), when the city of Berlin was captured by the Red Army
- The Fall of Berlin (film), Soviet film in two parts directed by Mikheil Chiaureli. It was released in 1950 by the Mosfilm Studio and is about the Battle of Berlin
- Fall of Berlin – 1945, a Soviet documentary film about the Battle of Berlin, directed by Yuli Raizman and Yelizaveta Svilova

== See also ==
- Raid on Berlin
