= Enthusiasm (disambiguation) =

Enthusiasm indicates a human emotion of deep enjoyment.

Enthusiasm may also refer to:

- Enthusiasm (film), a 1931 Soviet film by Dziga Vertov
- "Enthusiasm", a song by the American band Bright from their self-titled album

== See also ==
- Enthusiast (disambiguation)
