= In Spring (film) =

1929 documentary film

- Directed by: Mikhail Kaufman
- Production company: All-Ukrainian Photo Cinema Administration (VUFKU)
- Release date: 1929
- Country: Soviet Union
- Languages: Silent film No intertitles

In Spring (Russian: «Весной», romanized: Vesnoi, Ukrainian: «Навесні», romanized: Navesni) is a 1929 Soviet silent experimental documentary directed by Mikhail Kaufman. It was the first independent work of the cinematographer, made in accordance with the ideas of the avant-garde manifesto Kinoks and was Kaufman's directorial debut.

According to some Russian media, at the end of the 20th century the film was considered lost; a copy was discovered in 2005 at an archive in Amsterdam.

== Production ==
It was Kaufman's response to the film "Man with a Movie Camera", proving that it is possible without the help of intertitles to express certain ideas differently than Vertov.

A discord between Michael Kaufman and Dziga Vertov foreshadowed the creation of the film "In Spring". Between the filmmaker brothers there were creative differences even when working on the picture Man with a Movie Camera. According to Kaufman, the film itself had a lot of chaos, and footage assembly was carried out without "a clearly worked out plan". The spat led to Mikhail deciding to create his own film on the basis of stylistic and technical methods that have been used by him in previous films:

"That year with Vertov we diverged in views for good and all and began to work independently. I was armed with a movie camera and had a multitude of methods concerning reflection of life. Regarding the topic of spring, I actually stumbled upon it by accident."

By composition, the picture "In Spring" was divided into five nominal parts ("At the Turn", "Spring Vexation", "Life", "National Holidays", "Spring is Coming"), but the director did not conduct a special "organization of material for the film"; at the heart of the work was only observation of the progress of life. At the same time, as noted by Nikolai Ushakov, author of the book "Three Cinematographers", Kaufman sometimes had to take on the role of a tamer: to get closer to a bird which is filmed and to get its trust, he "accustomed it to a movie camera".

== Overview ==
In Spring (1929)

The beginning of the film shows the gradual progression from winter to spring. A snowman, which initially looks strong and monolithic, gradually begins to melt away. Streams begin flowing along roads and thawed ice is melts from the rooftops. Citizens open windows, remove winter insulation, and bring warm blankets to the balcony. On the streets there are mobile cisterns and carts with kvass and ice cream.

The next part of the film presents an industrial landscape and the continuous movement of machines, gears, and trolleys. A shops lays out the newspaper "Socialist emulation Bulletin" for the year 1929. Then the camera transports the viewer to city parks and gardens. On the trunk of a tree, two snails mate, while in the branches, birds build nests; bees swarm around flowers, and flower buds bloom. Citizens, freed from winter clothing, walk in pairs or alone. Young women wheel open strollers through the streets, children ride bicycles, and adults drive automobiles. People gather in a cemetery to eat and drink during Radonitsa.

The final section of the film includes footage of people marching with flags at a demonstration, sport competitions, and a football match at a crowded stadium. A daredevil-bicyclist rides on the street while playing the accordion and girls dance. An airplane flies through the sky.

== Reception ==
The film, released in 1930, received a positive response, and became the subject of special film studies research. The French film theorist Georges Sadoul declared Kaufman's directorial debut as "the best picture of 1929". During the discussion which took place in Kiev after the film's premiere, the writer and critic Leonid Pervomayskiy noted that in the film are present "both Kaufman the artist and Kaufman the poet" and described the director's montage as "brilliant". According to writer Oleksandr Korniychuk, Kaufman was able to "brilliantly organize scattered pieces united by a common idea". One critic wrote that "Kaufman's snail is as beautiful as Greta Garbo and the ants battling for the cocoon is perceived as a tragedy." In its 2021 list of the 100 best films in the history of Ukrainian cinema, the National Oleksandr Dovzhenko Film Centre placed In Spring at #15.

Kaufman's work did not go without comparisons to that of his brother Vertov. Nikolai Ushakov noted that "Kaufman exceeds Vertov in deciphering reality because the director 'partially abstracts' what is shot by the cinematographer". Retrospectively, film historian Lev Roshal described the film as "one of the most beautiful, lyrically delicate and plastically perfect documentaries", but gave credit to Vertov as a mentor figure for Kaufman: "The pupil has learned a lot. [...] It was Kaufman's victory but Vertov could also be proud of it."

The authors of Modern History of Russian Cinema, establishing the genre of In Spring as a cinema poem, have identified "a generic trait", which defines not only the Kaufman film, but also other documentary films of the 1920s—"a vividly pronounced beginning of an auteur".

== Stylistic aspects ==
Kaufman really does not have any revolutionary transformation of reality. <...> His world is full of joy just from the fact of his own existence. From puddles, from shiny icicles from a couple strolling along the boulevard. And there was evening and there was morning, and he saw that it was good.

In his last interview published in the journal "New World", Mikhail Kaufman said that during the work he also wanted to show a destructive force and "biology of spring", and the change in the consciousness that comes along with the melting snow. To the director it was important to "avoid head-on proselytism": the spectator observing together with the author the short-term transformation of everything living has to feel the symbolism of individual shots and sequences by himself.

Special emphasis during montage was given to the rhythm: he took charge of the "natural processes", and the traffic and movement of citizens on the streets. Kaufman combined "gustatory, olfactory and auditory sensations" of nature when demonstrating the "lyricism of spring": flowers in his film directly before the eyes fill with vitality and chestnuts "communicate" with each other. At some point the viewer changes from the passive observer to an active participant of the on-screen action: in particular during the scene where water splashes charge from the screen - under the wheels of the car - right into the cinema hall. The same proximity effect to observed events is visible in the episode with the train:

"In Spring" also has footage which shows what the camera attached between the wheels of the train sees as it moves along with the train - the wheels race directly at the viewer. Kaufman succeeded marvelously at dissecting the train's movements.
