= Lullaby (1937 film) =

1937 film by Dziga Vertov

- Directed by: Dziga Vertov
- Cinematography: Elizaveta Svilova, Union of Soviet Newsreel Studios
- Music by: Daniil Pokrass; Dmitry Pokrass
- Production company: Moscow Newsreel Studio
- Release date: 1937 (Soviet Union)
- Running time: 59 minutes
- Country: Soviet Union
- Language: Russian

Lullaby (Russian: Колыбельная, translit. Kolybelnaya) is a 1937 Soviet documentary film directed by Dziga Vertov. The film was shot to commemorate the 20th anniversary of October Revolution.

== Plot ==
The film opens with a caption stating that in every city and village of the USSR, "liberated women sing lullabies of happiness to their children." The first and second parts of the film are lyrical depictions of life in the 1930s, showcasing various scenes: mothers in a maternity ward, babies in strollers, children playing in a circle, schoolchildren at their desks, a young pianist beside her teacher, students in a dance studio, women working in fields, in factories, skydiving, and harvesting grapes. These vignettes are accompanied by brief poetic narrations, such as "Your hands are happy because they are at work" and "And you soar above the world."

The third part of the film includes footage from official events: Stalin and other Soviet leaders greet delegates at the All-Union Women's Conference; a participant delivers a speech from the podium about the significance of Article 122 of the 1936 Soviet Constitution, which granted women "the opportunity to study, build, and live happily"; and a young Pioneer reports on the various extracurricular clubs attended by schoolchildren.

The final section of the film juxtaposes newsreel footage of the Spanish Civil War with scenes of Soviet training flights, highlighting the contrast between the struggles abroad and the achievements of women in the USSR.

== History of the film ==
Film scholars, analyzing early drafts of Dziga Vertov’s screenplay written between 1935 and 1936, concluded that the director's initial concept was significantly different from the final version. The first draft, titled "Girls of Two Worlds", was intended to compare the lives of women in Soviet, pre-revolutionary, and Western societies. According to film historian Alexander Deryabin, Vertov’s notes were marked by a mix of extravagance and eclecticism, resembling a collage of creative ideas intertwined with newspaper clichés and fragments of Soviet songs: "From the very first pages, the directness of propaganda mingles with lyrical tones; unexpectedly, the provocative style of Vertov’s early manifestos resurfaces, possibly alongside subconscious complexes".

The initial script was rejected as "incoherent," but some of its ideas were incorporated into the final version of Lullaby. Its theme aligned with Soviet ideology, and pre-release publicity prepared audiences for its debut. For instance, the newspaper Izvestia reported in the fall of 1937 that a film about "the happy life of Soviet women" would be released to coincide with the 20th anniversary of the October Revolution. While Lullaby did make it to theaters, all screenings were abruptly canceled after five days without explanation. Interestingly, the ban applied only to the film itself, not to the song featured in the movie, composed by Daniil and Dmitry Pokrass.

It is difficult to say what exactly displeased Joseph Stalin about Vertov’s film. Perhaps the problem lay in its visual excess: the constant depiction of women’s faces and figures, combined with Stalin’s presence, might have suggested unintended analogies. The expression "Father of the Nation" takes on overly literal connotations here—Stalin, as the sole male character (and certainly the central figure), appears only surrounded by women, and each of his appearances is followed by shots of children, primarily young girls.

== Reviews and criticism ==
Despite its ban, Lullaby remained a subject of interest for film scholars across different eras. One detailed review emerged during the Khrushchev Thaw: N. P. Abramov, author of the 1962 book Dziga Vertov, noted that the avant-garde director's film served as a polemical response to D. W. Griffith’s Intolerance. Describing Vertov's film as a "song about motherhood", Abramov highlighted the first two parts as "masterpieces of audio-visual editing." However, he found the official newsreel content in the central section and the final episodes less effective, stating they merely repeated elements already used in Three Songs About Lenin.

Twenty years later, Lev Roshal, author of another book on Vertov, praised the editing in Lullaby as "dense, rich, and rhythmically precise." Roshal suggested that by 1937, Vertov had reached the creative limits of producing large-scale, survey-style depictions of national life, which might explain the director's dissatisfaction with the film.

Alexander Deryabin, examining various versions of Vertov's screenplay, concluded that during the production of Lullaby, the director attempted to break away from conventional documentary norms and "aestheticize the tragic, which defies human comprehension." Oleg Kovalev compared the poetics of Lullaby to some cinematic techniques employed by Leni Riefenstahl, stating that Vertov's film is "capable of inspiring admiration both for its aesthetic form and the consistency with which its bold concept is developed on screen."

The mother rocking a child in Lullaby, whose perspective ostensibly narrates the film, transforms throughout the narrative into a Spanish, Ukrainian, Russian, or Uzbek mother. Yet, the film conveys a single mother figure. The image of the mother is distributed across multiple characters... Before us is not a mother, but the Mother.
