= Enthusiast (disambiguation) =

An enthusiast is a person filled with or guided by enthusiasm.

Enthusiast or enthusiasts may also refer to:

- An alternate term for a fan
- Enthusiast (horse), a British Thoroughbred racehorse
- Enthusiast (personality type), of the Enneagram model

== See also ==
- Enthusiasm (disambiguation)
