= Raid on Berlin =

Raid on Berlin may refer to:

- 1757 raid on Berlin during the Third Silesian War
- 1760 raid on Berlin during the Third Silesian War
- Bombing of Berlin in World War II (1940–1945)
