= Yelizaveta Svilova =

Russian-Soviet filmmaker and editor

- Елизавета Свилова
- Born: Elizaveta Schnitt; 5 September 1900; Moscow, Russian Empire
- Died: 11 November 1975 (aged 75); Moscow, Russian SFSR, Soviet Union
- Occupations: Film editor; filmmaker
- Spouse: Dziga Vertov (m. 1923; died 1954)

Yelizaveta Ignatevna Svilova (Russian: Елизавета Игнатьевна Свилова; née Schnitt; 5 September 1900 – 11 November 1975) was a Russian filmmaker and film editor. She is perhaps best known for making films with her husband Dziga Vertov and her brother-in-law Mikhail Kaufman. She is also known for her documentaries about World War II and for appearing in and editing Man with a Movie Camera (1929).

== Biography ==
Yelizaveta Ignatevna Svilova (born Elizaveta Schnitt) was born on 5 September 1900, in Moscow. Starting at age 14, she began film editing for Pathé. She worked with Vladimir Gardin and with Vsevolod Meyerhold. From 1918 to 1922, she worked at Narkompros. From 1922, she worked at Goskino. She met Dziga Vertov while working as a film editor. They married in 1923. After her husband fell out of favor in the Soviet film industry, Svilova continued to work in film and supported both of them. They continued to work together until Vertov's death from stomach cancer in 1954.

Though she began as an editor, Svilova moved away from doing fiction films and onto montage documentary. Svilova edited the seminal Soviet propaganda film about the liberation of Auschwitz Oświęcim (1945). Her directorial debut was For You at the Front (1942). The Fall of Berlin (1945), co directed with Yuli Raziman, won the 1946 Stalin prize.

She was the director-editor of over 100 documentaries and newsreel episodes from 1939 to 1956.

Following her husband's death, Svilova left the industry. She carefully watched over her husband's legacy by publishing his writings and cataloging his manuscripts. She died in 1975 in Moscow and is buried in Novodevichy Cemetery.

== Council of Three ==
She was part of the "Council of Three", with her husband and brother-in-law, cinematographer Mikhail Kaufman. They were regarded as montage theorists and together, they "proclaimed a 'death sentence' on the cinema that came before, faulting it for mixing in 'foreign matter' from theater and literature."

The group is known for "pioneering montage documentary". Their film Man with a Movie Camera (1929) features Svilova editing film and Kaufman filming the movie. The film is regarded as "a landmark in experimental cinema".

Shortly after Man with a Movie Camera, Kaufman and Vertov had a falling out over artistic differences resulting in the two brothers never working together again. One suggested reason is prominence of Svilova in the film and her subsequent notoriety.

The trio was known for their avant-garde and futurist ideas. Vertov's work was condemned for being too formalist and not adhering to the socialist realism expectations of the time. In 1927, he was fired from Sovkino Studio. In the late 1930s, it was nearly impossible for Vertov to find work in the state-run film industry.

== World War II ==
She covered the opening of Auschwitz in German-occupied Poland by the Red Army in January 1945. She filmed a documentary, which included reenactments, titled Auschwitz, part of an exhibition titled "Filming the War; the Soviets and the Holocaust (1941-1946)" (9 January 2015 – 27 September 2015) in Paris, France at the Memorial de la Shoah.

In 1946, her film Fascist Atrocities was used as evidence in the Nuremberg Trials. She later directed a film about the trials, condemning the warmongering and atrocities present in World War II.

== Filmography ==
Year	Title	Notes
1920's	Kino-Pravda	23 issue newsreel series
1924	Cinema Eye	Editor
1925	The First October Without Ilich	2nd Unit/Assistant Director
1926	A Sixth Part of the World	2nd Unit/Assistant Director
1926	Shagay, Sovet!	2nd Unit/Assistant Director
1927	Bukhara	Director
1928	The Oath of Youth	Director
1928	The Eleventh Year	2nd Unit/Assistant Director
1929	Man with a Movie Camera	Editor
1929	Enthusiasm	2nd Unit/Assistant Director
1934	Three Songs of Lenin	2nd Unit/Assistant Director, Order of the Red Star winner
1938	In Memory of Sergo Ordzhonikidze	Assistant Director
1942	For You at the Front	Director
1944	Klyatva Molodykh	Director
1945	The Fall of Berlin	Director, won the 1946 Stalin Prize
1945	Auschwitz	Director/Writer
1946	Fascist Atrocities	Editor
1946	Parade of Youth	Director
1947	Nuremberg Trials	Director
