= Kinoks =

1920s Soviet collective of filmmakers

The Kinoks (Russian: Киноки, romanized: kino-oki, lit. 'cinema-eyes') were a collective of Soviet filmmakers in the 1920s, consisting of Dziga Vertov, Elizaveta Svilova and Mikhail Kaufman.

According to Annette Michelson, Georges Sadoul states the collective was founded in 1922 by Svilova, Vertov and Kaufman, and the painter Belyaev was a fourth member. However, in 1923 Svilova wrote an open letter to the journal LEF applying for admission to the Council of Three. Scholars have interpreted this as a publicity stunt "to provide exposure of their work and to raise awareness of their commitment to documentary cinema" rather than an actual application, since Svilova had already been working with Vertov and Kaufman for several years. From 1922 to 1923 Vertov, Kaufman, and Svilova published a number of manifestos in avant-garde journals which clarified the Kinoks' positions vis-à-vis other leftist groups.

The Kinoks argued strongly for documentary cinema and the use of candid cameras and filming workers instead of using actors. They published a series of manifestos and statements in LEF, an avant-garde cinema journal.

The most acclaimed work is Man with a Movie Camera (1929).
