= Fall of Berlin – 1945 =

- Битва за Берлин 1945 г
- Directed by: Yuli Raizman; Yelizaveta Svilova
- Release date: 1945
- Country: USSR

Fall of Berlin – 1945, The Fall of Berlin, or just Berlin (Russian: Берлин) is a Soviet documentary film about the Battle of Berlin, titled in Russian Битва за Берлин 1945 г., literally The Battle for Berlin – 1945. The film was directed by Yuli Raizman and Yelizaveta Svilova.

The film begins with an animated map of Eastern Europe with Soviet soldier double exposed on the bottom. The narrator lists the names of the rivers that the Red Army crosses as they march west: Volga, Don, Desna, Dnieper, Bug, Dvina, Neman, Vistula, and finally, Oder. The Soviet arrival at the Oder river is shown, along with the broken bridges across it. The undeterred men of the Red Army are shown as they cross the river while under German fire. The use of missile artillery by the Soviet forces is showcased.

After the Oder is crossed, the assault on Berlin itself begins. Footage of the actual battle is shown, as the Red Army fights German troops, street by street and building by building. This is interspersed with shots of Nazi propaganda films showing parades in the same areas, providing a sense of irony. A dramatic sequence follows a detachment of the Red Army in the assault on the Reichstag, which ends with the famous photograph, raising the Red Flag over the Reichstag.

When the Soviet troops entered Berlin, they began to push forward to the Reichstag. There were soldiers from every available battalion, with flame throwers, rifles, sniper rifles, automatic weapons, like the PPSh-41, and others. There were over 40 Soviet T-34 tanks that were pushing the German soldiers back. The battle for Berlin was one of the longest battles for a city in the years 1900–2000.

Shortly before the Russian troops entered Berlin, Hitler was ready to make a half-peace with England and the US, giving away Berlin to them. He said: "I'd rather give Berlin to the Americans or the English, only to prevent Russian forces from taking it over!", but he thought of this too late. Shortly after that the Russians approached and attacked Berlin. On 8 May 1945, the flag of the USSR replaced the Nazi German flag in Berlin. This was the end of World War II in Europe.

== See also ==
- List of Allied propaganda films of World War II
