= Iskusstvo =

Russian art magazine

Iskusstvo - The Art Magazine
- Editor: Alina Streltsova
- Categories: Fine arts
- Frequency: quarterly
- Publisher: Alya Tesis
- Founded: 1933
- Country: Russia
- Language: Russian language
- Website: iskusstvo-info.ru

Iskusstvo (Russian: Искусство, literally: "Art") is a Russian art magazine, dedicated to issues of contemporary art and culture, that was founded in 1933. It is the oldest of the currently published in Russia art magazines.

== History ==
The magazine has been published since 1933 in the Russian language. From July 1941 till 1946 and from 1995 till 2002 magazine was not published. Preserving the tradition of the publication, the magazine regularly publishes materials that present a professional look at classical art and in-depth analysis of the latest trends in contemporary art, art politics and art market.

Until 1995 the magazine highlights current issues of Soviet art and art history, artistic heritage issues, primarily of Russian art, the artistic culture of the peoples of the USSR, the arts of democratic countries, a number of articles devoted to the development problems of the Marxist–Leninist aesthetics and art theory. The journal covered artistic life of the USSR (the exhibition of art education, etc.). However, the magazine has always adhered to certain principles, including the highest level of expertise and focus on recognized and accomplished artists. It has strived to present the very highlights of the modern and contemporary art landscape (obviously, throughout the Soviet era there was a heavy focus on social realism and propaganda but that was inevitable).

At the moment, "Iskusstvo" - is an independent publication. The editorial board examines global artistic process as a whole. However, the journal remains committed to traditional subjects and tested values such as - painting, drawing, sculpture, design, crafts. But at the same time he is interested in promoting the practices of contemporary art, which today appear to be innovations, and possibly to become a classic. Essentially, this is an elite publication targeted at a quite sophisticated audience. One part of it is our long-time loyal, professional reader, the other is a new generation of well-off, open-minded and enthusiastic audience who want to be trendy and current.

Some of the key partners include Russia's leading art institutions such as the State Tretyakov Gallery, the Hermitage, the Russian Museum, and the State Pushkin Museum.

== Content ==
Each issue is usually theme-based. For instance, it can be focused on photography, abstract art, Chinese art, Russian painters abroad; the future of art etc. The issue typically comprises interviews with artists; expert articles with in-depth analysis of the theme; overviews of the key world exhibitions; and plenty of illustrations.

At different times for a magazine written and published articles by such well-known critics and artists such as: John Onians, James Elkins, B. E. Groys, M. Gnedovskiy, M. Guelman, E. Tar, AV Erofeev, AV Ippolitov, KM Malitskaya, VV Patsukov, AG Rappaport, L. Rempel, Stanislavsky, V. Fomin, N. Iljine, A. Lebedev, I. Markin, V. Tsereteli.

== Themes of articles ==
- Surrealism in landscape design;
- Boundaries of performance art;
- Contemporary photography: history, international cases and problematics;
- Public art;
- Art-criticism;
- Renaissance art;
- Indian art: history, contemporary development.

== Editorial Board ==
- Publisher — Alya Tesis
- Chief-editor — Alina Streltsova
- Layout — Darja Yarzambek
- Design — Olga Selivanova, Sergej Shmakov
- Style Editor — Petr Favorov
- Managing Editor — Tatiana Kurasova
- Editorial Assistant — Zhanna Staritsina
- Corrector — Nadezda Bolotina

== Literature ==
- Great Soviet Encyclopedia EDITOR BA Vvedenskaya second edition (1950 1958) TSB p. 510 vol. 18 signed for publication 8 January 1953
