= Three Songs About Lenin =

- Directed by: Dziga Vertov
- Written by: Dziga Vertov
- Cinematography: Mark Magidson; Bentsion Monastyrsky; Dmitri Surensky
- Distributed by: Amkino Corporation (USA, 1934)
- Release date: 1934
- Running time: 57 minutes
- Country: Soviet Union
- Language: Silent film

Three Songs about Lenin

Three Songs About Lenin (Russian: Три песни о Ленине) is a 1934 documentary sound film by Ukrainian-Russian filmmaker Dziga Vertov. It is based on three admiring songs sung by anonymous people in Soviet Russia about Vladimir Ilyich Lenin. It is made up of 3 episodes and is 57 minutes long.

== The songs in the film ==
The film opens with some texts on Lenin and his impact on the people, and then continue with three episodes. The first episode opens with the music from the second movement of Beethoven's piano sonata Pathétique, adapted for orchestra. It then moves to the first song My face was in a gloomy prison. The first episode lasts about 19 minutes. The second episode opens with the third movement (funeral march) of Chopin's piano sonata in b-flat minor, adapted for orchestra. In the middle section of the second song, Vertov uses Wagner's Siegfried's Funeral March in Götterdämmerung, the last installment of Der Ring des Nibelungen. The third song In a big city made of stone, where Tchaikovsky's Waltz of the Flowers is used.

== Later editions ==
In 1969 it was re-edited by Elizaveta Svilova, Ilya Kopalin and Serafima Pumpyanskaya as part of the 1970 Lenin centenary. In the early 1970s, the Anthology Film Archives selected the film for its collection of essential cinema.

This film was restored and released in home media (BD and DVD) by Flicker Alley and Eureka.
