= In Memory of Sergo Ordzhonikidze =

1937 film by Dziga Vertov

In the Memory of Sergo Ordzhonikidze (1937) by Dziga Vertov

In Memory of Sergo Ordzhonikidze (Russian: Памяти Серго Орджоникидзе, translit. Pamyati Sergo Ordzhonikidze) is a 1937 Soviet documentary film directed by Dziga Vertov. The film was created in memory of Sergo Ordzhonikidze, who had died in 1937.
