= Dziga Vertov =

Soviet-Jewish filmmaker (1896–1954)

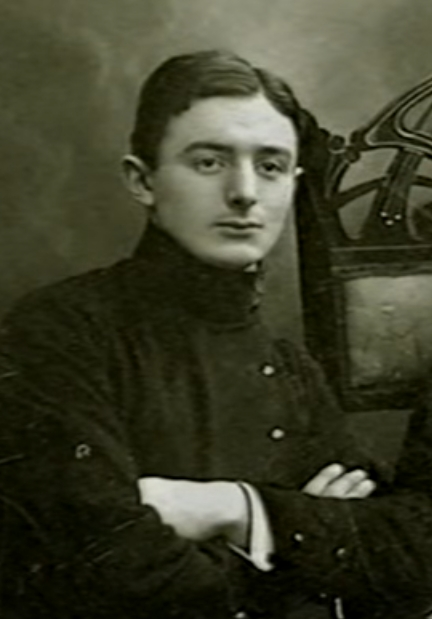
- Vertov in 1913
- Born: David Abelevich Kaufman; 2 January 1896; Białystok, Russian Empire
- Died: 12 February 1954 (aged 58); Moscow, Soviet Union
- Other name: Denis Arkadyevich Vertov
- Occupations: Film director, cinema theorist
- Years active: 1917–1954
- Notable work: Kino-Eye (1924); A Sixth Part of the World (1926); Man with a Movie Camera (1929); Enthusiasm (1931)
- Spouse: Elizaveta Svilova (m. 1923)
- Family: Boris Kaufman (brother); Mikhail Kaufman (brother)

Denis Arkadyevich Vertov (Note: In this name that follows East Slavic naming customs, the patronymic is Arkadyevich and the family name is Vertov.) (Note: Russian: Денис Аркадьевич Вертов) (born David Abelevich Kaufman; (Note: In this name that follows East Slavic naming customs, the patronymic is Abelevich and the family name is Kaufman.) (Note: Russian: Давид Абелевич Кауфман, and also known as Denis Kaufman) 2 January 1896 [O.S. 21 December 1895] – 12 February 1954), better known as Dziga Vertov, (Note: Russian: Дзига Вертов) was a Soviet pioneer documentary film and newsreel director, as well as a cinema theorist. His filming practices and theories influenced the cinéma vérité style of documentary movie-making and the Dziga Vertov Group, a radical film-making cooperative which was active from 1968 to 1972. He was a member of the Kinoks collective, with Elizaveta Svilova and Mikhail Kaufman.

In the 2012 Sight & Sound poll, critics voted Vertov's Man with a Movie Camera (1929) the eighth-greatest film ever made.

Vertov's younger brothers Boris Kaufman and Mikhail Kaufman were also noted filmmakers, as was his wife, Yelizaveta Svilova. He worked with Boris Kaufman and cinematographer Mikhail Kaufman on his most famous film Man with a Movie Camera.

== Biography ==
=== Early years ===
Vertov was born David Abelevich Kaufman into a Jewish family in Białystok, Poland, then a part of the Russian Empire. He Russified his Jewish name and patronymic, David Abelevich, to Denis Arkadievich at some point after 1918. Vertov studied music at Białystok Conservatory until his family fled from the invading German Army to Moscow in 1915. The Kaufmans soon settled in Petrograd, where Vertov began writing poetry, science fiction, and satire. In 1916–1917 Vertov was studying medicine at the Psychoneurological Institute in Saint Petersburg and experimenting with "sound collages" in his free time. He eventually adopted the name "Dziga Vertov", which translates loosely from Ukrainian as 'spinning top'.

=== Early writings ===
Vertov is known for many early writings, mainly while still in school, that focus on the individual versus the perceptive nature of the camera lens, which he was known to call his "second eye".

Most of Vertov's early work was unpublished, and few manuscripts survived after the Second World War, though some material surfaced in later films and documentaries created by Vertov and his brothers, Boris Kaufman and Mikhail Kaufman.

Vertov is known for quotes on perception, and its ineffability, in relation to the nature of qualia (sensory experiences).

=== After the October Revolution ===
After the Bolshevik Revolution of 1917, at the age of 22, Vertov began editing for Kino-Nedelya (Кино-Неделя, the Moscow Cinema Committee's weekly film series, and the first newsreel series in Russia), which first came out in June 1918. While working for Kino-Nedelya he met his future wife, the film director and editor, Elizaveta Svilova, who at the time was working as an editor at Goskino. She began collaborating with Vertov, beginning as his editor but becoming assistant and co-director in subsequent films, such as Man with a Movie Camera (1929), and Three Songs About Lenin (1934).

Vertov worked on the Kino-Nedelya series for three years, helping establish and run a film-car on Mikhail Kalinin's agit-train during the ongoing Russian Civil War between Communists and counterrevolutionaries. Some of the cars on the agit-trains were equipped with actors for live performances or printing presses; Vertov's had equipment to shoot, develop, edit, and project film. The trains went to battlefronts on agitation-propaganda missions intended primarily to bolster the morale of the troops; they were also intended to stir up revolutionary fervor of the masses.

In 1919, Vertov compiled newsreel footage for his documentary Anniversary of the Revolution; he also supervised the filming of his project The Battle for Tsaritsyn (1919). in 1921 he compiled History of the Civil War. The so-called "Council of Three", a group issuing manifestoes in LEF, a radical Russian newsmagazine, was established in 1922; the group's "three" were Vertov, his (future) wife and editor Elizaveta Svilova, and his brother and cinematographer Mikhail Kaufman. Vertov's interest in machinery led to a curiosity about the mechanical basis of cinema.

His statement "We: Variant of a Manifesto" was published in the first issue of Kino-Fot, published by Aleksei Gan in 1922. It commenced with a distinction between "kinoks" and other approaches to the emergent cinematic industry:

We call ourselves kinoks – as opposed to "cinematographers", a herd of junkmen doing rather well peddling their rags.

We see no connection between true kinochestvo and the cunning and calculation of the profiteers.

We consider the psychological Russo-German film-drama – weighed down with apparitions and childhood memories – an absurdity.

==== Kino-Pravda ====
In 1922, the year that Nanook of the North was released, Vertov started the Kino-Pravda series. The series took its title from the official government newspaper Pravda. "Kino-Pravda" (literally translated, "film truth") continued Vertov's agit-prop bent. "The Kino-Pravda group began its work in a basement in the centre of Moscow", Vertov explained. He called it damp and dark. There was an earthen floor and holes one stumbled into at every turn. Vertov said, "This dampness prevented our reels of lovingly edited film from sticking together properly, rusted our scissors and our splicers.

Vertov's driving vision, expounded in his frequent essays, was to capture "film truth"—that is, fragments of actuality which, when organized together, have a deeper truth that cannot be seen with the naked eye. In the Kino-Pravda series, Vertov focused on everyday experiences, eschewing bourgeois concerns and filming marketplaces, bars, and schools instead, sometimes with a hidden camera, without asking permission first. Usually, the episodes of Kino-Pravda did not include reenactments or stagings. (One exception is the segment about the trial of the Social Revolutionaries: the scenes of the selling of the newspapers on the streets and the people reading the papers in the trolley were both staged for the camera.) The cinematography is simple, functional, unelaborate—perhaps a result of Vertov's disinterest in both "beauty" and the "grandeur of fiction". Twenty-three issues of the series were produced over a period of three years; each issue lasted about twenty minutes and usually covered three topics. The stories were typically descriptive, not narrative, and included vignettes and exposés, showing for instance the renovation of a trolley system, the organization of farmers into communes, and the trial of Social Revolutionaries; one story shows starvation in the nascent Communist state. Propagandistic tendencies are also present, but with more subtlety, in the episode featuring the construction of an airport: one shot shows the Tsar's tanks helping prepare a foundation, with an intertitle reading "Tanks on the labor front".

Vertov clearly intended an active relationship with his audience in the series—in the final segment he includes contact information—but by the 14th episode the series had become so experimental that some critics dismissed Vertov's efforts as "insane". Vertov responded to their criticisms with the assertion that the critics were hacks nipping "revolutionary effort" in the bud, and concluded an essay with a promise to "explode art's tower of Babel". In Vertov's view, "art's tower of Babel" was the subservience of cinematic technique to narrative—what film theorist Noël Burch terms the institutional mode of representation—which would come to dominate the classical Hollywood cinema.

By this point in his career, Vertov was clearly and emphatically dissatisfied with narrative tradition, and expresses his hostility towards dramatic fiction of any kind both openly and repeatedly; he regarded drama as another "opiate of the masses". Vertov freely admitted one criticism leveled at his efforts on the Kino-Pravda series—that the series, while influential, had a limited release.

By the end of the Kino-Pravda series, Vertov made liberal use of stop motion, freeze frames, and other cinematic "artificialities", giving rise to criticisms not just of his trenchant dogmatism, but also of his cinematic technique. Vertov explains himself in "On 'Kinopravda'": in editing "chance film clippings" together for the Kino-Nedelia series, he "began to doubt the necessity of a literary connection between individual visual elements spliced together.... This work served as the point of departure for 'Kinopravda'". Towards the end of the same essay, Vertov mentions an upcoming project which seems likely to be Man with a Movie Camera (1929), calling it an "experimental film" made without a scenario; just three paragraphs above, Vertov mentions a scene from Kino Pravda which should be quite familiar to viewers of Man with the Movie Camera: the peasant works, and so does the urban woman, and so too, the woman film editor selecting the negative... "

==== Man with a Movie Camera ====
Man with a Movie Camera (1929)

With Lenin's admission of limited private enterprise through the New Economic Policy (NEP) of 1921, Russia began receiving fiction films from afar, an occurrence that Vertov regarded with undeniable suspicion, calling drama a "corrupting influence" on the proletarian sensibility ("On 'Kinopravda'", 1924). By this time Vertov had been using his newsreel series as a pedestal to vilify dramatic fiction for several years; he continued his criticisms even after the warm reception of Sergei Eisenstein's Battleship Potemkin (1925). Potemkin was a heavily fictionalized film telling the story of a mutiny on a battleship which came about as a result of the sailors' mistreatment; the film was an obvious but skillful propaganda piece glorifying the proletariat. Vertov lost his job at Sovkino in January 1927, possibly as a result of criticizing a film which effectively preaches the line of the Communist Party. He was fired for making A Sixth Part of the World: Advertising and the Soviet Universe for the State Trade Organization into a propaganda film, selling the Soviet as an advanced society under the NEP, instead of showing how they fit into the world economy.

The Ukraine State Studio hired Vertov to create Man with a Movie Camera. Vertov says in his essay "The Man with a Movie Camera" that he was fighting "for a decisive cleaning up of film-language, for its complete separation from the language of theater and literature". By the later segments of Kino-Pravda, Vertov was experimenting heavily, looking to abandon what he considered film clichés (and receiving criticism for it); his experimentation was even more pronounced and dramatic by the time of Man with a Movie Camera, which was filmed in Ukraine. Some have criticized the obvious stagings in this film as being at odds with Vertov's creed of "life as it is" and "life caught unawares": the scene of the woman getting out of bed and getting dressed is obviously staged, as is the reversed shot of the chess pieces being pushed off a chess board and the tracking shot that films Mikhail Kaufman riding in a car filming a third car.

However, Vertov's two credos, often used interchangeably, are in fact distinct, as Yuri Tsivian comments in the commentary track on the DVD for Man with the Movie Camera: for Vertov, "life as it is" means to record life as it would be without the camera present. "Life caught unawares" means to record life when surprised, and perhaps provoked, by the presence of a camera. This explanation contradicts the common assumption that for Vertov "life caught unawares" meant "life caught unaware of the camera". All of these shots might conform to Vertov's credo "caught unawares". His slow motion, fast motion, and other camera techniques were a way to dissect the image, Mikhail Kaufman stated in an interview. It was to be the honest truth of perception. For example, in Man with a Movie Camera, two trains are shown almost melting into each other. Although we are taught to see trains as not riding that close, Vertov tried to portray the actual sight of two passing trains. Mikhail spoke about Eisenstein's films as being different from his and his brother's in that Eisenstein "came from the theatre, in the theatre one directs dramas, one strings beads". "We all felt...that through documentary film we could develop a new kind of art. Not only documentary art, or the art of chronicle, but rather an art based on images, the creation of an image-oriented journalism", Mikhail explained. More than even film truth, Man with a Movie Camera was supposed to be a way to make those in the Soviet Union more efficient in their actions. He slowed down his movements, such as the decision whether to jump or not. You can see the decision in his face, a psychological dissection for the audience. He wanted a peace between the actions of man and the actions of a machine, for them to be, in a sense, one.

==== Cine-Eye ====
Kino-Eye (1924) by Dziga Vertov

"Cine-Eye" is a montage method developed by Dziga Vertov and first formulated in his work "WE: Variant of a Manifesto" in 1919.

Dziga Vertov believed his concept of Kino-Glaz, or "Cine Eye" in English, would help contemporary "man" evolve from a flawed creature into a higher, more precise form. He compared man unfavorably to machines: "In the face of the machine we are ashamed of man's inability to control himself, but what are we to do if we find the unerring ways of electricity more exciting than the disorderly haste of active people [...]" As he put it in a 1923 credo, "I am the Cine-Eye. I am the mechanical eye. I the machine show you the world as only I can see it. I emancipate myself henceforth and forever from human immobility. I am in constant motion... My path leads towards the creation of a fresh perception of the world. I can thus decipher a world that you do not know."

Like other Russian filmmakers, he attempted to connect his ideas and techniques to the advancement of the aims of the Soviet Union. Whereas Sergei Eisenstein viewed his montage of attractions as a creative tool through which the film-viewing masses could be subjected to "emotional and psychological influence" and therefore able to perceive "the ideological aspect" of the films they were watching, Vertov believed the Cine-Eye would influence the actual evolution of man, "from a bumbling citizen through the poetry of the machine to the perfect electric man".

Vertov surrounded himself with others who were also firm believers in his ideas. These were the Kinoks, other Russian filmmakers who would assist him in his hopes of making "cine-eye" a success.

Vertov believed film was too "romantic" and "theatricalised" due to the influence of literature, theater, and music, and that these psychological film-dramas "prevent man from being as precise as a stopwatch and hamper his desire for kinship with the machine". He desired to move away from "the pre-Revolutionary 'fictional' models" of filmmaking to one based on the rhythm of machines, seeking to "bring creative joy to all mechanical labour" and to "bring men closer to machines".

In May 1927 Vertov moved to Ukraine, and the Cine-Eye movement broke up.

=== Late career ===
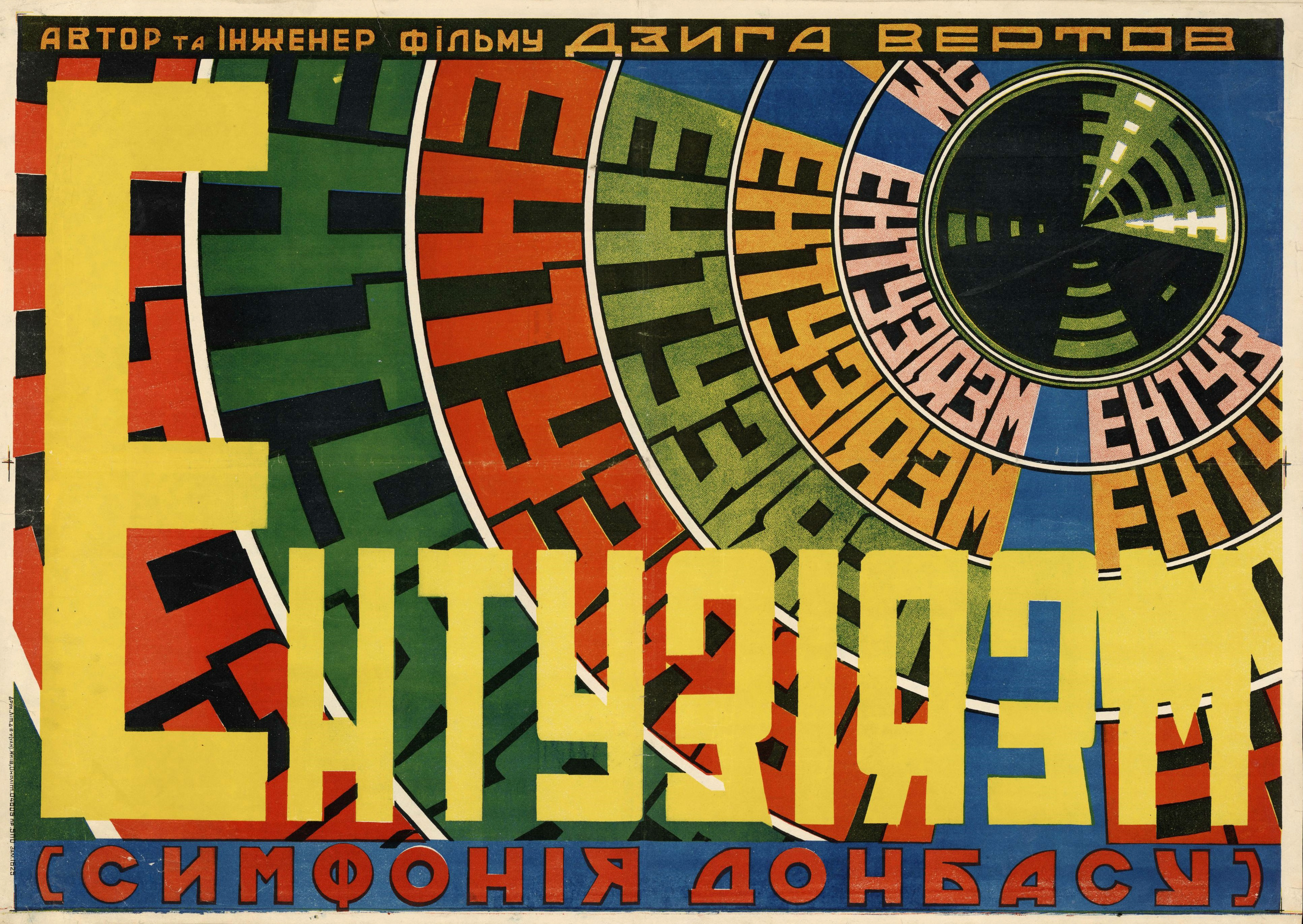
Enthusiasm: Symphony of the Donbass (1931)

Vertov's successful career continued into the 1930s. Enthusiasm: Symphony of the Donbass (1931), an examination into Soviet miners, has been called a 'sound film', with sound recorded on location, and these mechanical sounds woven together, producing a symphony-like effect. Many Soviet critics did not receive the film positively, but critics abroad lauded its sonic experimentation.

Three years later, Three Songs About Lenin (1934) looked at the revolution through the eyes of the Russian peasantry. For his film, Vertov had been hired by Mezhrabpomfilm. The film, finished in January 1934 for Lenin's obit, was only publicly released in the Soviet Union in November of that year. From July 1934 it was shown at private screenings to various high-ranking Soviet officials and also to prominent foreigners including H. G. Wells, William Bullitt, and others, and it was screened at the Venice Film Festival in August 1934. A new version of the film was released in 1938, including a longer sequence to reflect Stalin's achievements at the end of the film and leaving out footage of "enemies" of that time. Today there exists a 1970 reconstruction by Yelizaveta Svilova. With the rise and official sanction of socialist realism in 1934, Vertov was forced to cut his personal artistic output significantly, eventually becoming little more than an editor for Soviet newsreels. Lullaby, perhaps the last film in which Vertov was able to maintain his artistic vision, was released in 1937.

Dziga Vertov died of cancer in Moscow in 1954.

== Family ==
Vertov's brother Boris Kaufman was a cinematographer who worked with Jean Vigo on L'Atalante (1934) and much later for directors such as Elia Kazan in the United States who won an Oscar for his work on On the Waterfront. His other brother, Mikhail Kaufman, worked with Vertov on his films until he became a documentarian in his own right. Mikhail Kaufman's directorial debut was the film In Spring (1929).

In 1923, Vertov married his long-time collaborator Elizaveta Svilova.

After the October Revolution, Vertov's parents returned to Białystok, which became part of Poland. According to his brother, they were later murdered by the Nazis during the Holocaust.

== Influence and legacy ==
Vertov's legacy still lives on today. His ideas are echoed in cinéma vérité, the movement of the 1960s named after Vertov's Kino-Pravda. The 1960s and 1970s saw an international revival of interest in Vertov.

The independent, exploratory style of Vertov influenced and inspired many filmmakers and directors like the Situationist Guy Debord and independent companies such as Vertov Industries in Hawaii. The Dziga Vertov Group borrowed his name. In 1960, Jean Rouch used Vertov's filming theory when making Chronicle of a Summer. His partner Edgar Morin coined the term cinéma vérité when describing the style, using direct translation of Vertov's KinoPravda.

The Free Cinema movement in the United Kingdom during the 1950s, the Direct Cinema in North America in the late 1950s and early 1960s, and the Candid Eye series in Canada in the 1950s all essentially owed a debt to Vertov.

This revival of Vertov's legacy included rehabilitation of his reputation in the Soviet Union, with retrospectives of his films, biographical works, and writings. In 1962, the first Soviet monograph on Vertov was published, followed by another collection, "Dziga Vertov: Articles, Diaries, Projects". In 1984, to recall the 30th anniversary of Vertov's death, three New York cultural organizations put on the first American retrospective of Vertov's work.

New Media theorist Lev Manovich suggested Vertov as one of the early pioneers of database cinema genre in his essay Database as a symbolic form.

Vertov's work has inspired notable artist and filmmaker William Kentridge.

== Filmography ==
Anniversary of the Revolution (1918)

- 1918 Кинонеделя (Kino Nedelya/Cinema Week)
- 1918 Годовщина революции (Anniversary of the Revolution)
- 1921 История гражданской войны (History of the Civil War)
- 1922 Киноправда (Kino-Pravda)
- 1924 Советские игрушки (Soviet Toys)
- 1924 Кино-глаз (Kino-Eye), cameraman Ilya Kopalin
- 1926 Шестая часть мира (A Sixth Part of the World)
- 1926 Шагай, Совет! (Stride, Soviet!)
- 1928 Одиннадцатый (The Eleventh Year)
- 1929 Человек с киноаппаратом (Man with a Movie Camera)
- 1931 Энтузиазм (Симфония Донбаса) (Enthusiasm)
- 1934 Три песни о Ленине (Three Songs About Lenin)
- 1937 Памяти Серго Орджоникидзе (In Memory of Sergo Ordzhonikidze)
- 1937 Колыбельная (Lullaby)
- 1938 Три героини (Three Heroines)
- 1942 Казахстан – фронту! (Kazakhstan for the Front!)
- 1944 В горах Ала-Тау (In the Mountains of Ala-Tau)
- 1954 Новости дня (News of the Day)

=== Lost films ===
Some early Vertov's films were lost for many years. Only 12 minutes of his 1918 Anniversary of the Revolution were known; in 2018 Russian film historian Nikolai Izvolov found the lost film in the Russian State Documentary Film & Photo Archive and restored it. In 2022 he reconstructed another lost film, 1921 The History of the Civil War using archive materials.

== See also ==
- Soviet montage theory
- Formalist film theory
- Pure Cinema
- Abstract Film
