= Enthusiasm (film) =

1931 Soviet sound film by Dziga Vertov

Enthusiasm: The Symphony of Donbas
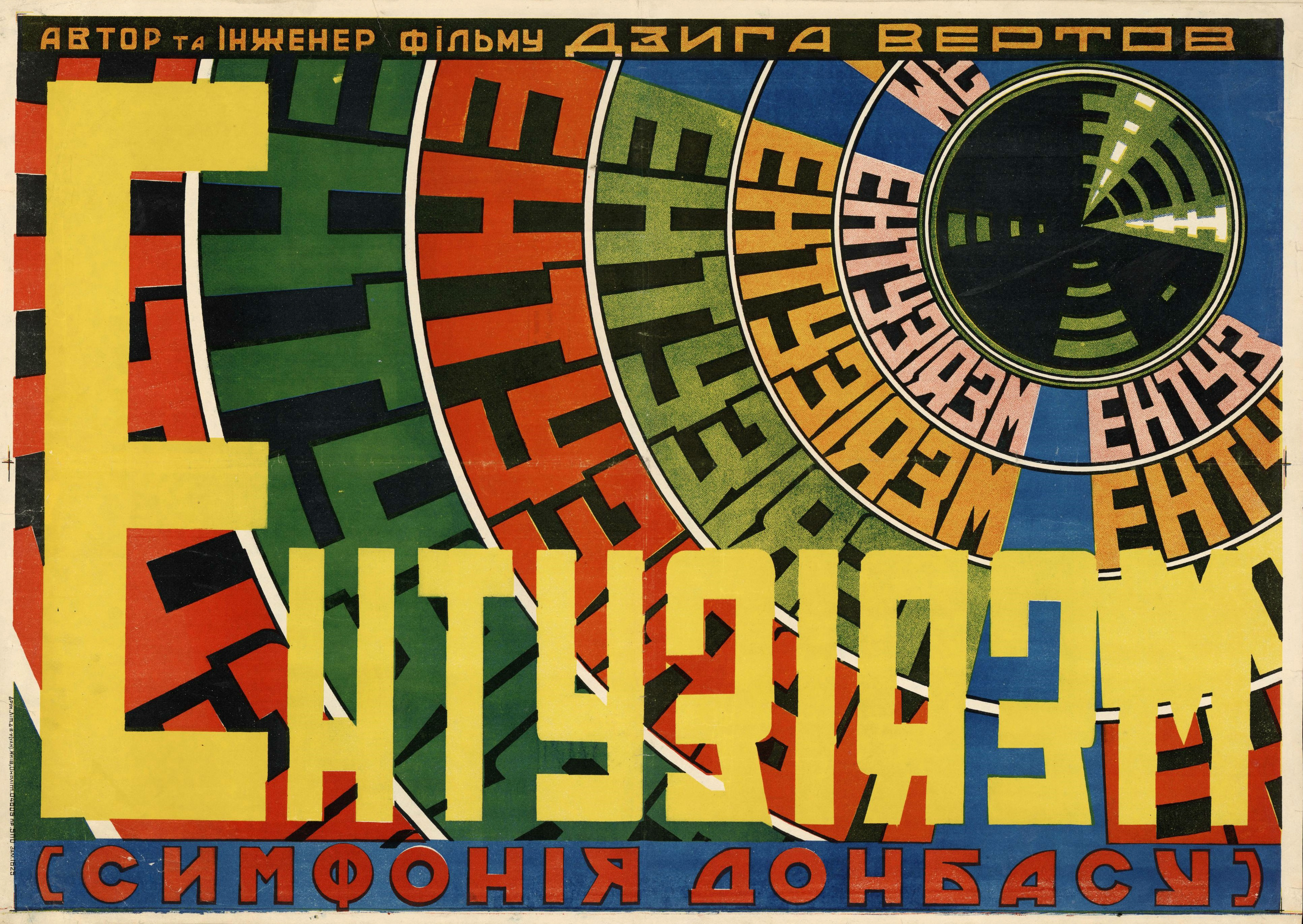
- Film poster
- Directed by: Dziga Vertov
- Written by: Dziga Vertov
- Produced by: Ukrainfilm
- Cinematography: B. Cejtlin
- Edited by: Elizaveta Svilova
- Release date: 1931
- Running time: 65 minutes
- Country: Soviet Union
- Language: Russian

Enthusiasm: The Symphony of Donbas (Russian: Энтузиазм: Симфония Донбасса, romanized: Enthusiasm: Symphony of Donbass, Ukrainian: Ентузіязм: Симфонія Донбасу or Entuziiazm: Symfoniia Donbasu) is a 1931 sound film directed by Soviet filmmaker Dziga Vertov. The film was the director's first sound film and also the first of the Soviet production company Ukrainfilm. The film's score is considered experimental and avant-garde because of its incorporation of factory, industrial, and other machine sounds; human speech plays only a small role in the film's sounds.

Vertov himself described Enthusiasm as "the lead icebreaker in the column of sound newsreels." He considered the film's "complex interaction of sound with image" to be the work's most significant achievement. The director viewed the film as an extended experiment in which the juxtaposition and misalignment of sound were completely intentional. The film is also notable for the fact that it is a documentary filmed on location. Like many of his other films, Vertov worked on Enthusiasm with his wife Elizaveta Svilova.

== Intention ==
The film was created to promote and celebrate Stalin’s Five-Year Plan which took place during the years 1928 to 1932. The setting of the film is an important facet of examining Vertov’s intent as a director, since Ukraine’s Donbas region was a focal point of the Five-Year Plan. The Donbas was regarded as particularly rich in natural resources—namely, coal—with which the Soviet state could achieve its productive and goals. The Donbas area of Ukraine had already been industrialized since the 1800s, but the Soviets wanted to attain its full industrialization after the Bolshevik Revolution.

In his writings, Vertov expounded on the prominent role he envisioned for the natural resources: “Coal comes out of the earth. Coal for factories. Coal for locomotives. Coal for coke furnaces. Coal has arrived. The conveyors and sorting machines have started up. The aerial chains of coal-filled carts have begun to move. The blast furnaces are operating at full speed. Metal has arrived. The rolling and open-hearth, rolled, open-hearth, rolled, open-hearth—in a single creative thrust toward socialism.” The film emphasizes the importance of coal in its setting and image content. As mentioned in the film summary, once the setting of the film changes to that of the Donbas region, there are numerous images of coal workers, furnaces, and carts full of coal.

Vertov and his film crew purposefully juxtaposed image and sound in Enthusiasm. He attempted to do so by refusing to synchronize the film's images with its score to create a greater effect on the viewers. Presumably due to the complex role Vertov wanted his film's score to undertake, one source describes the movie's sounds as a “protagonist” in and of itself. “In 1931, in his Entuziazm (subtitled ‘Symphony of the Donbas’) he turned the microphone into protagonist just as earlier, he had made the camera his hero. Not only did he and his team conduct a successful experiment with a mobile microphone, they did not settle for simply synchronizing sound and image, instead taking the line of ‘greatest resistance’ by creating an eloquent counterpoint between the two.”

== Summary ==
Enthusiasm: The Symphony of Donbas (1930)

The film opens with a young woman putting on and adjusting a radio headset. The film then moves between shots of the young woman with the radio to various individuals praying outside of a church in front of a statue of Jesus Christ. An announcement is made on the radio that the Last March is about to be played from Shostakovitch’s “Symphony of Donbas”. While the musical piece is playing, there are more shots of various people praying outside of the church; there is a scene of churchgoers coming up to the statue, kneeling and kissing the statue's feet.

The film shifts its attention to various groups marching. These scenes are juxtaposed with images of the church. An announcement is made that “The pope is chained to the church’s moneybag” as some of the previous marchers deconstructing a church; revolutionaries remove the church's contents while also dismantling the external signs of its religious nature.

There is a scene of what appears to represent a factory and factory production. Images of smiling workers are mixed with images of production. The words “Towards Socialism” flash across the screen.

The setting of the film changes and transitions to a montage of images representing industrialization and mechanization, along with references to the Five-Year Plan. The footage in this portion of the film is clearly from the Donbas. Workers are depicted on their way to work. As time passes after the start of the Five-Year Plan, annual progress is commented upon. The film focuses on the production of coal for the country and for its factories. There are shots of individual workers laboring near large open flames. There are shots of groups of workers laboring together to, presumably, break the coal apart. There is an announcement made which states that the Five-Year Plan, presumably due to workers’ enthusiasm and dedication, was completed in four years. Despite their completion of the Plan, they continue working.

Approximately an hour in the film's runtime, various celebrations take place to rejoice the victory of socialism. There are depictions of numerous marches and speeches. Audiences also get a view of how socialism functioned in rural, agricultural areas, as people are shown baling hay, riding tractors, and taking part in their own local celebrations of socialism.

== Analysis ==
Scholars have identified a few ways to divide and analyze the film. John MacKay, Professor of Slavic Languages and Literatures and a specialist in Soviet cinema studies at Yale, has argued that Enthusiasm can be divided into three sections. The first portion is where the social ills of religion and alcohol are disregarded to prepare for the implementation of socialism. The film transitions to its second portion when the focus is placed on production in the Donbas region. MacKay describes it as the third and final portion of the film when the Donbas's production is sent off to provide for other regions of the U.S.S.R.

On the other hand, academics have organized the film into two parts: “In the first part of the film, before we are hit by the barrage of new sounds of industrialization, Vertov creates a series of disjunctures between the images and sounds of the immobile and decadent pre-socialist society entrenched in the old forms…Eventually the montage shows how the old way has been formally superseded by the industrialized and socialist world…”. To do so, the director juxtaposed images of the role of religion, the church, and churchgoers—among other symbols recognized as vestiges of the past—with images of industry, production, and mechanization.

== Production ==
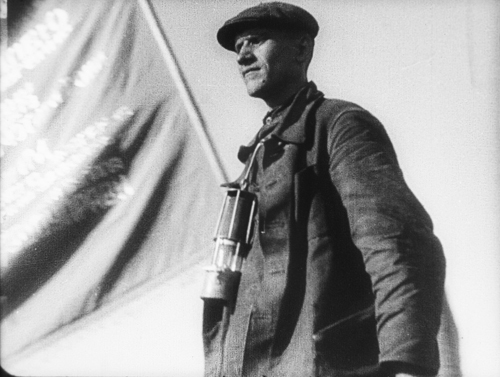
A shot from the film

Most of the film was shot in Ukraine’s Donbas region. The Donbas, although it was relatively industrialized compared to other regions in the U.S.S.R., presented its own challenges to the film project. Once Vertov and his crew arrived to the Donbas, they did not have much time to record the film score. Upon their arrival to the region, they had about a month to record the location’s sounds. The lack of time was further compounded by a dearth in available transportation, and as a result, the film crew was forced to lug their equipment: “Faced with the complete absence of means of transport, we walked, dragging, as we went, a twenty-seven-hundred-pound load. Crawling on all fours to the ‘sticks’.” Therefore, creating the film was as much a mentally-taxing endeavor as it was a physical one.

Starting in 1929, Vertov began recording the film’s visual footage before he formulated the film score. Vertov’s sound production and the sounds used in the film are both essential to understanding the significance and context of Enthusiasm has in Soviet cinema and cinematic history. The film served as a platform on which Vertov could experiment with sound and filming on location. He wanted to refute long-standing, preconceived notions of the way sounds were thought to be used in cinema. Some of the assumptions Vertov worked against included the idea that movie directors should only include sounds produced in a studio or that cinematic sound could only be of the artificial variety. The Donbas Symphony, in contrast, was an experiment in using mobile sound equipment while outside and filming on location.

== Release and Reception ==
Just before the film’ release the director wrote: “The shooting of Enthusiasm was completed more than half a year ago. Released by the factory for the 1930 October celebrations, it’s still not been released to the public. It awaits a serious appraisal of its merits and shortcomings. It awaits a strict, but not irrelevant evaluation. Not an evaluation in general terms (outside of time and space), but one based on sound cinema’s present state of development.”

The movie was released on 2 April 1931. Audiences were confused by the work and there were not many positive reviews—therefore, Enthusiasm did not fare well in theaters and was quickly taken out of circulation. "[Enthusiasm] was rediscovered only in the 1960s due to renewed interest to the Soviet avant-garde in the West. Enthusiasm was restored by the National Dovzhenko Film Studios on request of the State Film Agency of Ukraine in 2011.” In the early 1970s, the Anthology Film Archives selected Enthusiasm for its collection of essential cinema.

== Criticism ==
Vertov has been critical of Enthusiasm in his own writings. He has written that the project's goals were incredibly ambitious and most likely beyond the technological capabilities—in the realm of sound production and film footage—of his time. Vertov's lack of satisfaction with the film's finished product may explain why he viewed Enthusiasm as neither an incomplete nor “entirely realized” film. The director also received criticism for the “inhuman noises,” he used as the film's score.

Vertov wrote in response to the criticism his film received upon its release. On page 114 of Kino-Eye: The Writings of Dziga Vertov, the director expressed his frustration with those critics who wanted to critique the film's sound or the film's footage individually and separately from each other. Instead, he believed that critics should view both the film's sound and images and the way they worked together. In the same section of his writing, he urged for a holistic, contextualized critique of the film: “Those who worked on Enthusiasm and, I think, all those in newsreel film, are interested in a many-sided (and not a one-sided) analysis of this film.” To Vertov, the role and place of his film in the course of cinema, Soviet cinema, and documentary film were all necessary components of critically appraising Enthusiasm's success and significance.

On an abstract, theoretical level, criticism has been levelled against the film because of a supposed lack of conflict. In John McKay's "Disorganized Noise: Enthusiasm and the Ear of the Collective", he notes that Enthusiasm—along with another Vertov film, One Sixth of the World—was accused of presenting a sort of utopian world in which socialism was established and functioned without any apparent conflict. Vertov’s decision to present a society in which socialism had triumphed and create a movie without conflict—without a struggle to mirror the challenges in the real-world realization of socialism—gained him his share of critics. For this reason, some Bolshevik party members were skeptical as to whether the film truly represented the party and its ideology and history.
