= Mikhail Kaufman =

Russian cinematographer and photographer (1897–1980)

- Михаил Кауфман
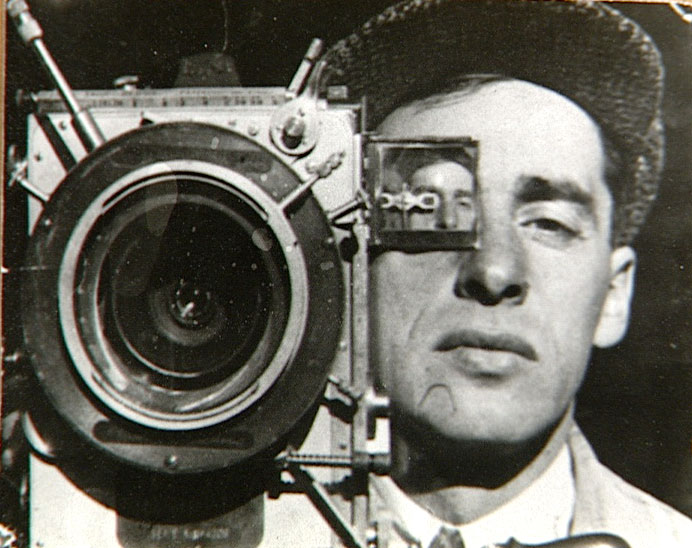
- Kaufman with his camera
- Born: 1897; Białystok, Grodno Governorate, Russian Empire
- Died: March 11, 1980 (aged 82–83); Moscow, Russian SFSR, Soviet Union
- Occupation: Cinematographer
- Relatives: Dziga Vertov (brother); Boris Kaufman (brother)

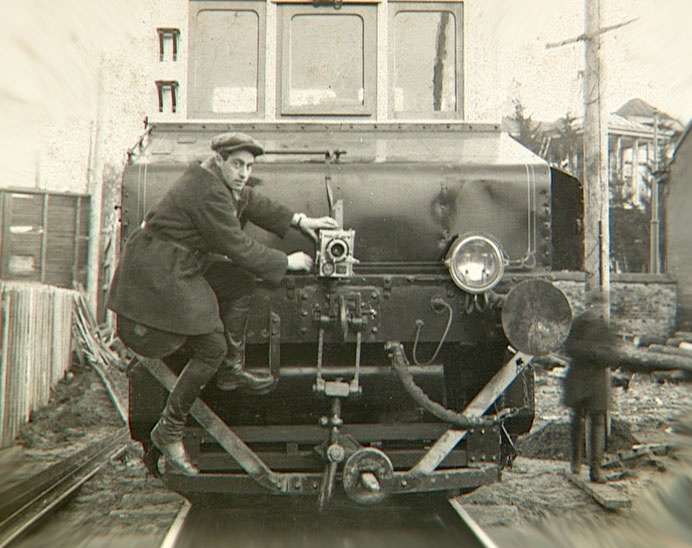
Kaufman shooting from train

Mikhail Abelevich Kaufman (Russian: Михаил Абелевич Кауфман; 1897 – March 11, 1980) was a Soviet and Russian cinematographer, photographer and film director. He was the younger brother of filmmaker Dziga Vertov (Denis Kaufman) and the older brother of cinematographer Boris Kaufman.

== Early life ==
He was born into a family of Jewish intellectuals living in Białystok in Grodno Governorate, at the time when the Białystok region was a part of the Russian Empire.

== Career ==
In the 1920s, after Mikhail Kaufman returned from the Russian Civil War, Vertov offered him the opportunity to participate in his newsreel series Kino-Pravda as a cameraman.

Mikhail Kaufman directed photography for several films, including Vertov's Man with the Movie Camera (1929). The film is built around meta-reference and is full of innovative visual effects: in it, Kaufman acts as a cameraman and is seen shooting the film while walking on high bridges, hanging off the side of a train, climbing a smokestack and crawling underground with miners – all in order to get the best shot. His brother's wife, Yelizaveta Svilova, was editor and part of the "Council of Three" who "proclaimed a 'death sentence' on the cinema that came before, faulting it for mixing in 'foreign matter' from theater and literature.

Mikhail Kaufman directed a number of films, some of the notably early ones being Moscow (1927), In Spring (1929), and An Unprecedented Campaign (1931). Shortly after the filming of Man with the Movie Camera, Kaufman and Vertov fell out over artistic differences. The two would never work together again. Kaufman continued to work as an operator and a film director during his whole life, until the late 1970s.

Kaufman died on March 11, 1980, in Moscow. His brother Boris died 3 months later.
