= Tromsø techno scene =

Techno music culture in Tromsø, Norway

The Tromsø techno scene is the origin of many of Norway's most important artists within electronic music. The internationally best-known names are Röyksopp, Biosphere and Bel Canto.

The record label Beatservice Records and the Insomnia Festival makes Tromsø still leading in the country as of the development and promotion of the genre.

== History ==
The city of Tromsø has since the early 1990s been mentioned as "the techno capital" of Norway. The first generation of the Tromsø techno scene consisted of, among others, Geir Jenssen (Bel Canto / Biosphere), Anneli Drecker (Bel Canto), Per Martinsen (Mental Overdrive), Rune Lindbæk and Bjørn Torske.

A local student radio by the name Brygga Radio, including Bjørn Torske, had success with radio show Beatservice at this time. Here was Vidar Hanssen, who later founded the record label Beatservice Records, a keen contributor.

The success of especially Bel Canto, Biosphere and Mental Overdrive, both at home and abroad, inspired an increasing number of Tromsø residents to invest their time in the genre. This resulted in several new projects in the 1990s, with groups such as Aedena Cycle, Alanïa, Drum Island, and Frost. Svein Berge and Torbjørn Brundtland, who later formed the world-renowned group Röyksopp, were very active in the scene at the time, and members of several of the above mentioned groups. Other new and important names at the time were Gaute Barlindhaug (Kolar Goi), Kolbjørn Lyslo and Ole Johan Mjøs.

In 2002, the Insomnia Festival was founded. It is today Norway's leading festival for electronic music, alongside Numusic in Stavanger.

In the later years, artists like Doctor Katasztrofa, F.A.C.E., The Clean Shaven Grins, Kohib and the award-winning Alog have emerged from the scene.

== The TOS.CD ==
To celebrate ten years of the Beatservice Radio show in 1994, Vidar Hanssen decided to collect tracks from all of the Tromsø techno artists for a compilation CD. The result was released in October 1994: "TOS.CD - Tromsø Techno 1994". Established acts like Biosphere, Mental Overdrive and Ismistik all contributed exclusive tracks, together with up-and-coming stars like Aedena Cycle, Electric-C, B-Code, Information and Dynamic Bits. The album showed the variety in the Tromsø scene, ranging from relaxed ambient via poppy dance to hard edged techno/trance.

The album name refers to the airport code of the Tromsø Airport, which is TOS.

== List of artists ==
- Röyksopp
- Biosphere
- Bel Canto
- Mental Overdrive
- Bjørn Torske
- Rune Lindbæk
- Frost
- Kolar Goi
- Aedena Cycle
- Alanïa
- Drum Island
- Those Norwegians
- Alog
- The Clean Shaven Grins

== See also ==
- Insomnia Festival
- Beatservice Records
- Vidar Hanssen
- Bergen Wave
