= Insomnia Festival =

Music Festival in Norway

- Genre: electronic, jazz, hip hop
- Dates: October (3 days)
- Locations: Tromsø, Norway
- Years active: 2002-present
- Founders: Karl Kristian Hansen Kolbjorn Lyslo
- Website: insomniafestival.no

The Insomnia Festival is an annual electronic music festival which takes place during autumn in Tromsø, Norway. The first festival was held in 2002. Alongside the Numusic festival in Stavanger and Ekkofestival in Bergen, it is the largest and most important festival for electronic music in Norway.

== The name ==
The name is taken from the sleeping disorder insomnia. The polar night and the midnight sun makes Tromsø a city were some people struggle to sleep normally, made famous in the Norwegian movie Insomnia by Tromsø director Erik Skjoldbjærg. The movie later got an American re-make, also named Insomnia, starring Al Pacino and Robin Williams.

Being a festival targeting clubbers, the name suggests that instead of sleeping you can go clubbing.

== Profile ==
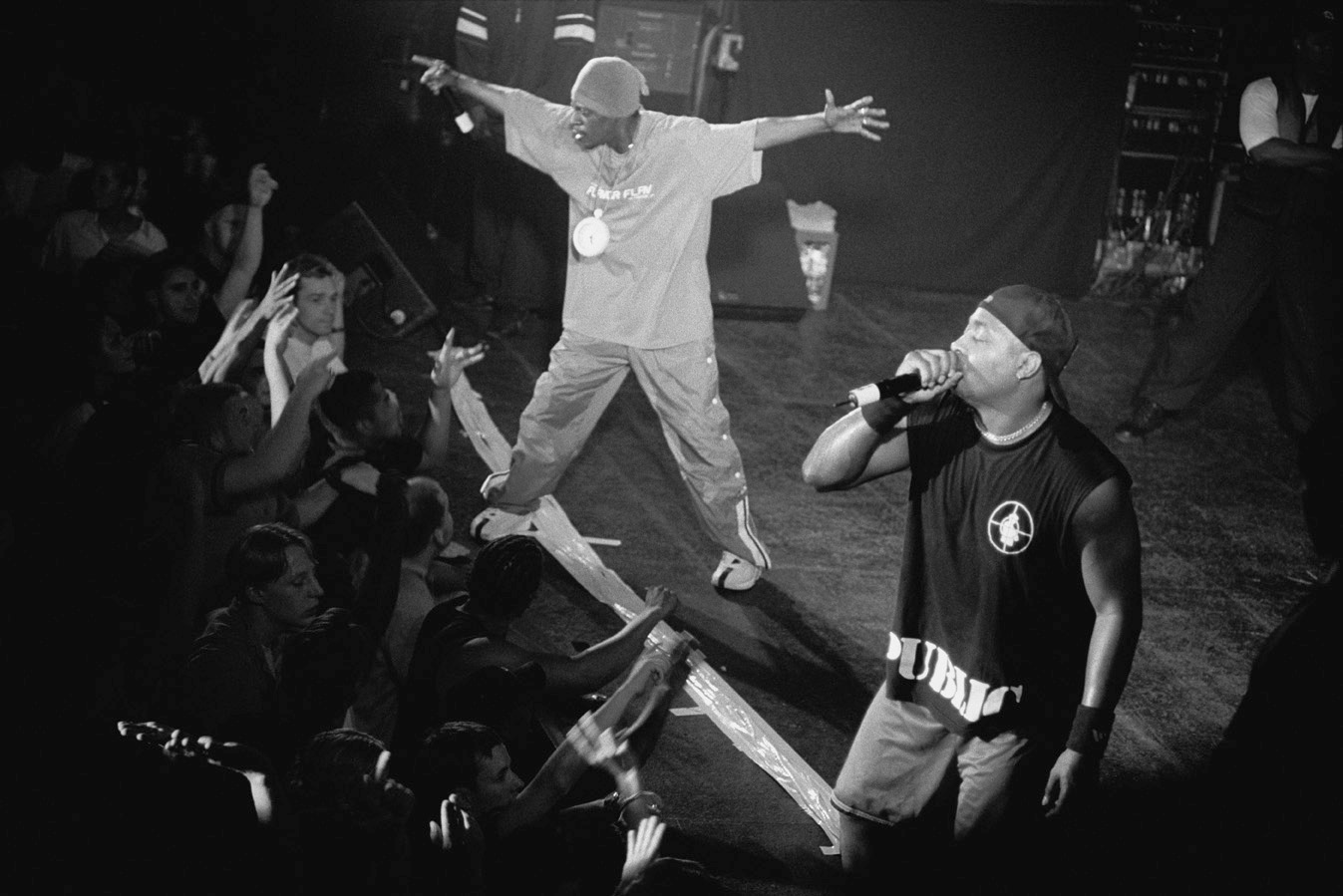
Public Enemy performing in 2000.

The festival had a Norwegian profile in the early years, and famous Norwegian acts have visited more than once. Having grown in popularity year after year, comparatively more international acts have started being booked to the festival. The booking of Public Enemy in 2006 was considered a turning point for the festival's popularity and ambition.

During the last years the festival has extended to contain also seminars, workshops and exhibitions. All under the umbrella name Techno Culture.

== History ==
Ugress, Biosphere, Kim Hiorthøy, Ralph Myerz and the Jack Herren Band, Flunk and Sternklang performed at the first festival in 2002.

The 2003 edition presented acts such as Datarock, Xploding Plastix, Bjørn Torske, Frost, DJ Mikal Tellé and Equicez.

In 2004 Biosphere, Lindstrøm, Bugge Wesseltoft and Kolar Goi headlined the festival.

The 2005 version presented many famous Norwegian acts, such as Datarock, Torbjørn Brundtland of Röyksopp (DJ set), Bertine Zetlitz, Mental Overdrive, Tommy Tee, Jaga Jazzist and Nils Petter Molvær.

In 2006 Public Enemy, 120 Days, Bel Canto, Alog, Aavikko, Nicolette, Snook, Frost and Ralph Myerz and the Jack Herren Band were among the most notable acts to perform at the festival.

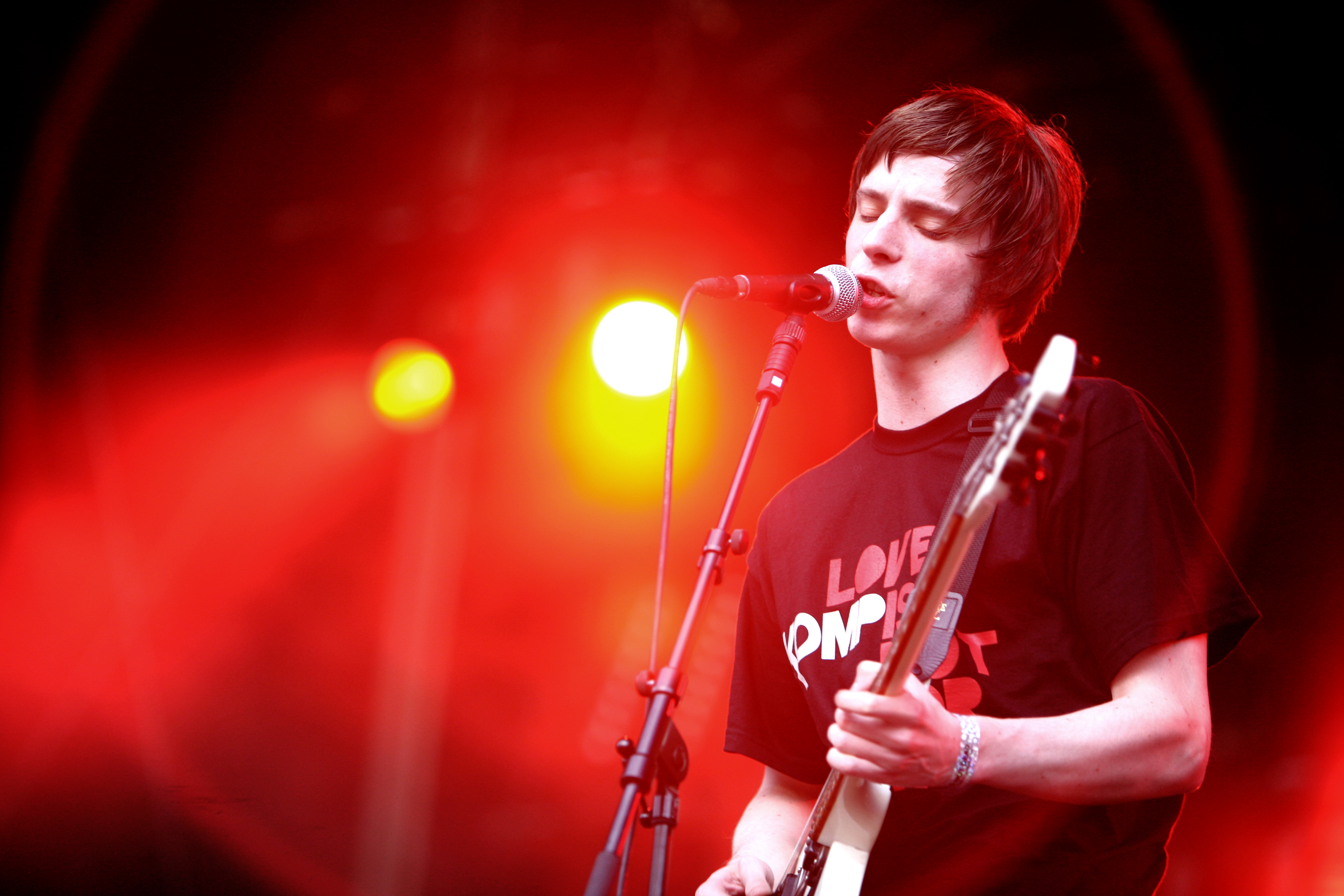
Ådne Meisfjord live with 120 Days in 2007.

In 2007 120 Days returned, performing alongside artists such as Apparat, Jan Jelinek, Notic Nastic, Bjørn Torske, Sir Alice, Joakim & The Ectoplasmic Band, Fear Falls Burning, Andy Moor & Yannis Kyriakides, Vinny Villbass & Diskjokke and Daniel Meteo. The presentation of the electronic instrument Reactable is also worth mentioning from the 2007 edition of Insomnia. The 2007 festival has been mentioned as the most successful, both in ticket sales and artist performances. The Apparat concert was rated as one of the best gigs in Tromsø in 2007 by local newspaper Nordlys.

In 2008 The Legendary Pink Dots, FM Belfast, Ismael Pinkler, Mimetic, SCSI-9, Djuma Soundsystem, Xploding Plastix and Ost & Kjex were booked to the festival.

The 2009 edition had a remarkable kick-off, featuring none other than Röyksopp, in what was their first concert back in their hometown since the breakthrough with Melody A.M. in 2001. The event sold out in only a few hours. Röyksopp's members Svein Berge and Torbjørn Brundtland are childhood friends with board member Gaute Barlindhaug of the Insomnia Festival, and the superstars decided to do the gig for free to help save the further existence of the electronic music festival in their hometown. The profit from the sold out event helped save the troubled economy of the festival.

Among other artists visiting the 2009 festival, was British The Emperor Machine, Andrew Meecham of Bizarre Inc's solo project. Another British appearance was Wave Machines. Matias Aguayo, Loccomotion, Deadbots, Khan of Finland, Glitterbug, Thomas Fehlmann, Tycho, Mike Huckaby and Menelaos completed the international part of the line-up. Lindstrøm was a national headliner, following his growing success in the later years. Also worth mentioning from the line-up, are the acclaimed local acts F.A.C.E, Femme Digital and Kohib, whom all had their debut gigs at the festival. Skatebård, Alexander Rishaug and Captain Credible were other Norwegian acts to visit.

In 2010, Bill Drummond, Tesla Boy, Kyle Hall, Alexander Robotnick, Wildbirds & Peacedrums, Brandt Brauer Frick, Captain Fufanu and Diskjokke Band were among the most notable artists whom visited the festival.

== See also ==
- List of electronic music festivals
