= Amateur Girlfriends Go Proskirt Agents =

Studio album by Xploding Plastix
- Released: March 12, 2001
- Genre: Acid jazz, electrofunk, big beat
- Length: 58:58
- Label: Beatservice Records

Xploding Plastix chronology
Behind the Eightball (2001)	Amateur Girlfriends Go Proskirt Agents (2001)	The Benevolent Volume Lurkings (2003)

Professional ratings
Review scores
Source	Rating
Allmusic	3/5 stars

Amateur Girlfriends Go Proskirt Agents is the debut album of Norwegian two-man band Xploding Plastix, released in 2001, featuring Erik Velldal on double bass and Espen Blystad on piano and organ.

The cover features an illustration by Tor Aage Larsen Vorren. The track "6 Hours Starlight" samples the Alfred Hitchcock film North by Northwest, and "Comatose Luck" samples The Petrified Forest.

== Track listings ==
=== Norway CD ===
1. "Sports, Not Heavy Crime" - 5:07
2. "Funnybones & Lazylegs" - 4:48
3. "6 Hours Starlight" - 3:22
4. "Behind the Eightball" - 4:50
5. "Single Stroke Ruffs" - 2:28
6. "Treat Me Mean, I Need the Reputation" - 4:58
7. "Relieved Beyond Repair" - 1:45
8. "Tintinnamputation" - 4:26
9. "More Powah to Yah" - 5:27
10. "Having Smarter Babies" - 4:57
11. "Far-flung Tonic" - 4:52
12. "Happy Jizz Girls" - 2:54
13. "Doubletalk Gets Through to You" - 5:24
14. "Comatose Luck" - 3:39

=== Norway 12" ===
==== Side A ====
1. "6 Hours Starlight"
2. "Behind the Eightball"
3. "Single Stroke Ruffs"
4. "Shakedown Shutoff" (LP Version)
5. "Relieved Beyond Repair"

==== Side B ====
1. "Happy Jizz Girls"
2. "Having Smarter Babies"
3. "Far-flung Tonic"
4. "Comatose Luck"
