= For Sleepyheads Only =

Studio album by Flunk
- Released: April 29, 2002 (Norway); May 20, 2002 (Worldwide); June 17, 2002 (UK); October 29, 2002 (US)
- Genre: Electronic
- Label: Beatservice Records (Norway/UK/Worldwide); BS051LP (LP); BS051CD (CD); Guidance Recordings (US); GDRC-609 (CD)
- Producer: Flunk

Flunk chronology
For Sleepyheads Only (2002)	Morning Star (2004)

For Sleepyheads Only is the 2002 debut album by Norwegian electronic band Flunk on Beatservice Records. The original pressing was on CD and vinyl while a later revised version was released only on CD in the US from Guidance Recordings.

== Track listing ==
=== Beatservice CD Version ===
1. "I Love Music"
2. "Blue Monday"
3. "Miss World"
4. "Sugar Planet"
5. "Honey's In Love"
6. "Magic Potion"
7. "Your Koolest Smile"
8. "Kebab Shop 3 Am"
9. "See Thru You"
10. "Sunday People (Don't Bang The Drum)"
11. "Syrupsniph"
12. "Distortion"

=== Beatservice LP version ===
1. I Love Music
2. Blue Monday
3. Miss World
4. Sugar Planet
5. Magic Potion
6. Your Koolest Smile
7. Kebab Shop 3 Am
8. See Thru You
9. Syrupsniph
10. Honey's In Love

=== Guidance version ===
1. I Love Music
2. Blue Monday
3. Miss World
4. Honey's In Love
5. Magic Potion
6. Your Koolest Smile
7. Kebab Shop 3 Am
8. See Thru You
9. Sunday People (Don't Bang The Drum)
10. Indian Rope Trick
11. Syrupsniph
12. Distortion

== Reception ==
Professional ratings
Review scores
Source	Rating
Allmusic	2/5 stars

A review from PopMatters of the album states that "if you’re looking for a kind of chill-out, downbeat album that you can throw on and ignore, then you could do far worse", but notes that "there really is some talent at work here, just not enough to turn the ordinary into extraordinary". Michael Paoletta of Billboard stated that it "grooves along at a relaxed pace, which makes it perfect for a Sunday afternoon or some post-club, chilled-out bliss". Justin Kleinfeld of CMJ New Music Report described it as a "trippy disc that's readymade for listening to by the campfire". It was named album of the month by DJ Mag.
