= Miss World (disambiguation) =

Miss World is the oldest surviving major international beauty pageant.

Miss World may also refer to:

- "Miss World" (song), a song by Hole
- Miss World (EP), an EP by Flunk
