= Byen =

Byen may refer to:

- Byen (album), studio album by Norwegian musician Bjørn Torske
- DR Byen, literally The DR City, headquarters of the Danish Broadcasting Corporation, DR, located in Copenhagen, Denmark
- DR Byen Station, rapid transit station on the Copenhagen Metro
- DGI-byen, facility that houses various spa facilities, restaurants, hotels, conference facilities, a bowling alley, flexible multi-centres, sports clubs, pool in central Copenhagen, Denmark
- FN Byen, also known as UN City, two campuses that combined house 11 United Nations agencies in Copenhagen
- TV-Byen, former headquarters of the Danish broadcaster DR, located in Gladsaxe, northwest of central Copenhagen, Denmark

== See also ==
- Under Byen, Danish band
