= Personal Stereo =

Studio album by Flunk
- Released: April 23, 2007
- Genre: Electronic
- Label: Beatservice Records (CD)
- Producer: Flunk

Professional ratings
Review scores
Source	Rating
The Gazette	3.5/5 stars

Personal Stereo is the fifth album by Norwegian electronic band Flunk released in 2007 on Beatservice Records.

== Track listing ==
1. Personal Stereo
2. Heavenly
3. If We Kiss
4. Haldi
5. Sit Down
6. See You
7. Two Icicles
8. Change My Ways
9. Keep On
10. 'Diet Of Water And Love' by The Valium Poets
