= Tarjei Strøm =

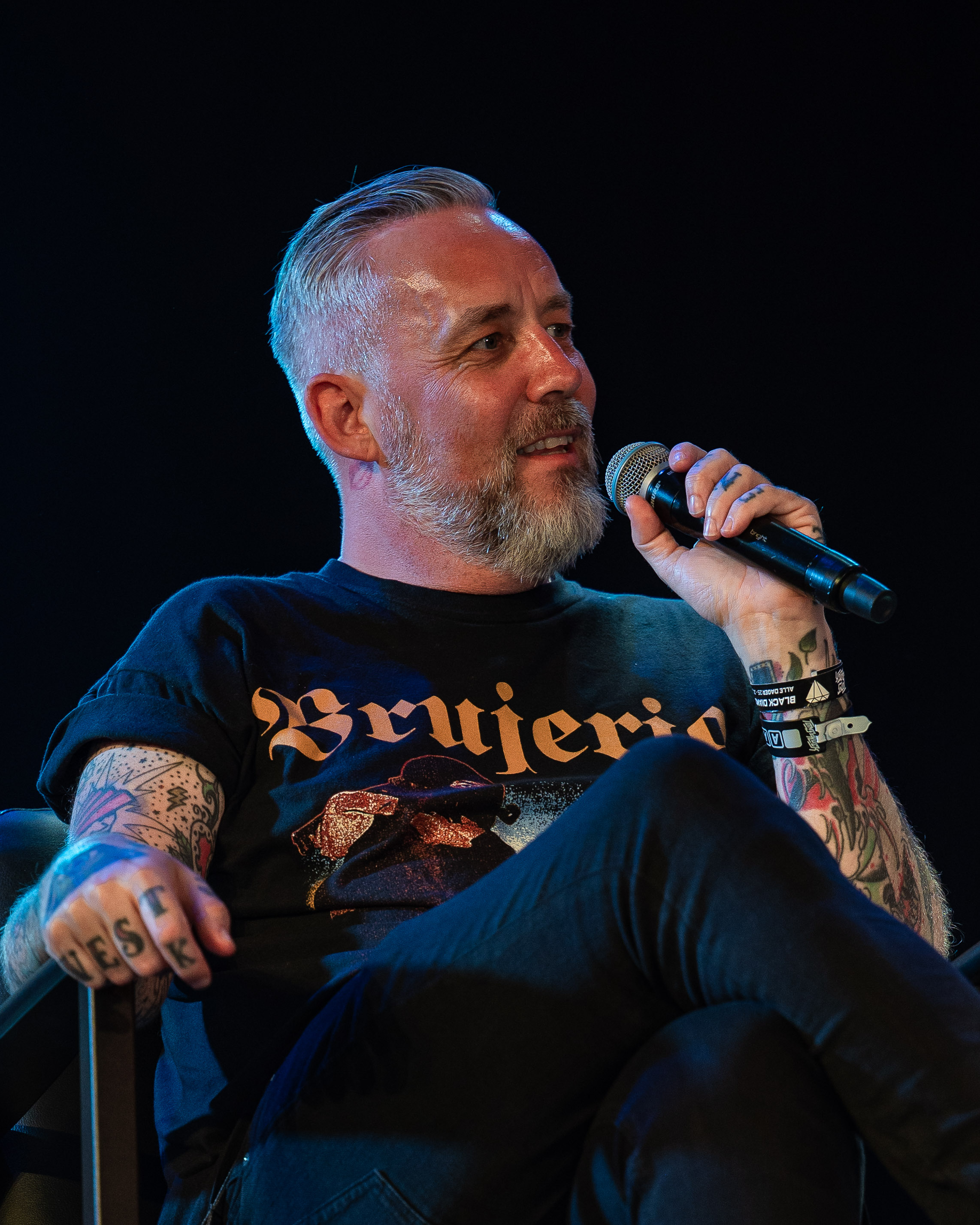
- Tarjei Strøm at Tons of Rock, Oslo 2025; Photo: Birgit Fostervold

Background information
- Born: Tarjei Frugård Strøm; October 26, 1978 (age 47); Bergen, Hordaland, Norway
- Occupations: Musician, Tv & Radio host
- Instrument: Drums

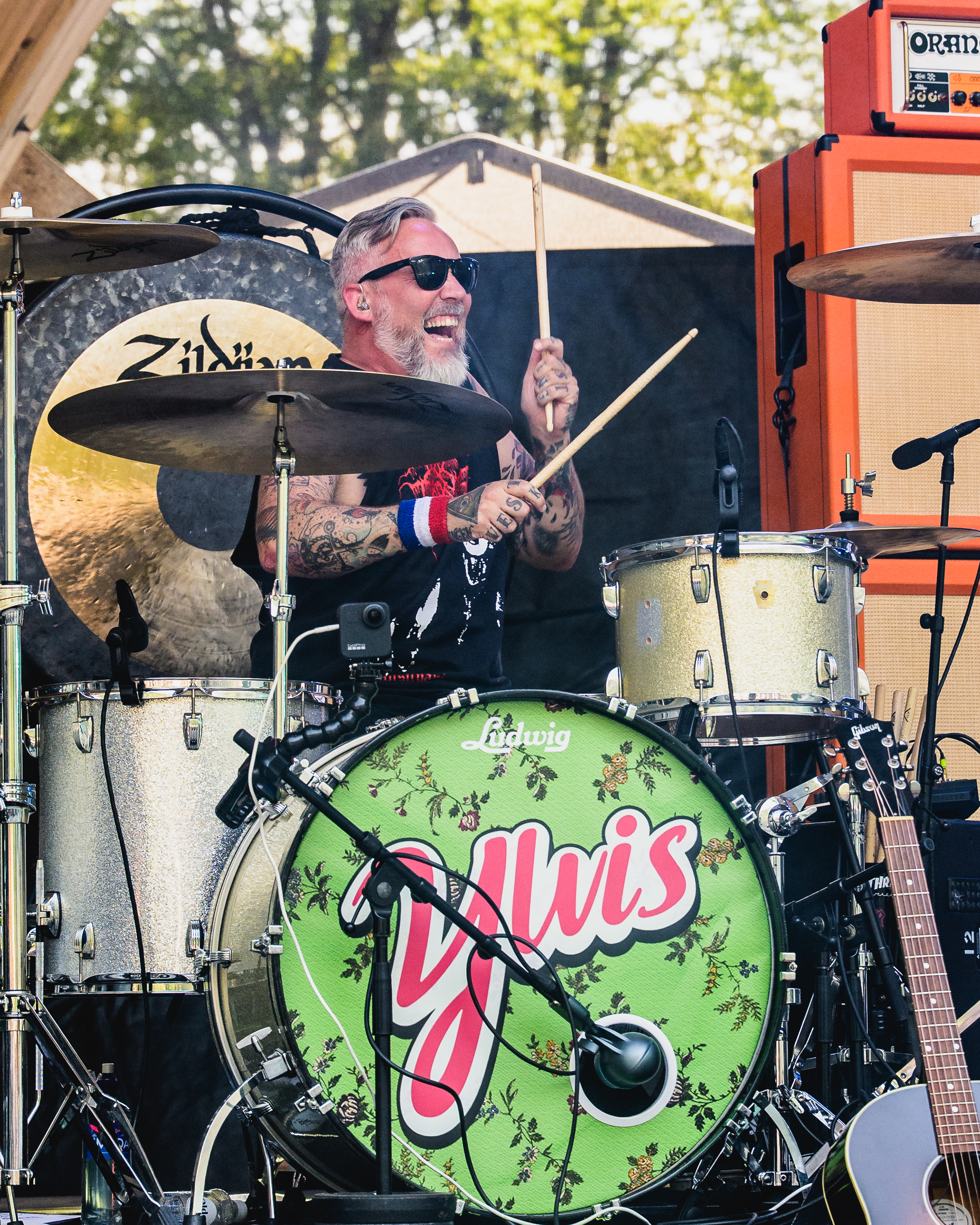
Performing with Ylvis in 2026

Tarjei Frugård Strøm (born October 26, 1978) is a Norwegian TV presenter and radio host, and a drummer for the rock/electronica groups Ralph Myerz and the Jack Herren Band and Datarock.

== Radio and TV work ==
Strøm works with the national broadcaster NRK, primarily as a radio host for music programmes, but he's also done several large TV shows – among those, The Stream and the music award show Spellemannprisen.

== Musical career ==
=== Ralph Myerz and The Jack Herren Band ===
The band was formed in 1997 when Erlend Sellevold aka DJ Ralph Myerz asked for people to play percussion with him during a party in Bergen. Thomas Lønnheim and Tarjei Strøm showed up through a combination of mutual contacts and high-school friendship. Supposedly a one-time-event, they had so much fun playing together that they decided to form a band, and Ralph Myerz & The Jack Herren Band was formed.

=== Datarock ===
Strøm was a touring and studio session drummer for the Norwegian rock/electronica group Datarock.

=== Studio/session work ===
Strøm has contributed to albums by several artists, among those Kings of Convenience, Ephemera, and Maria Mena.

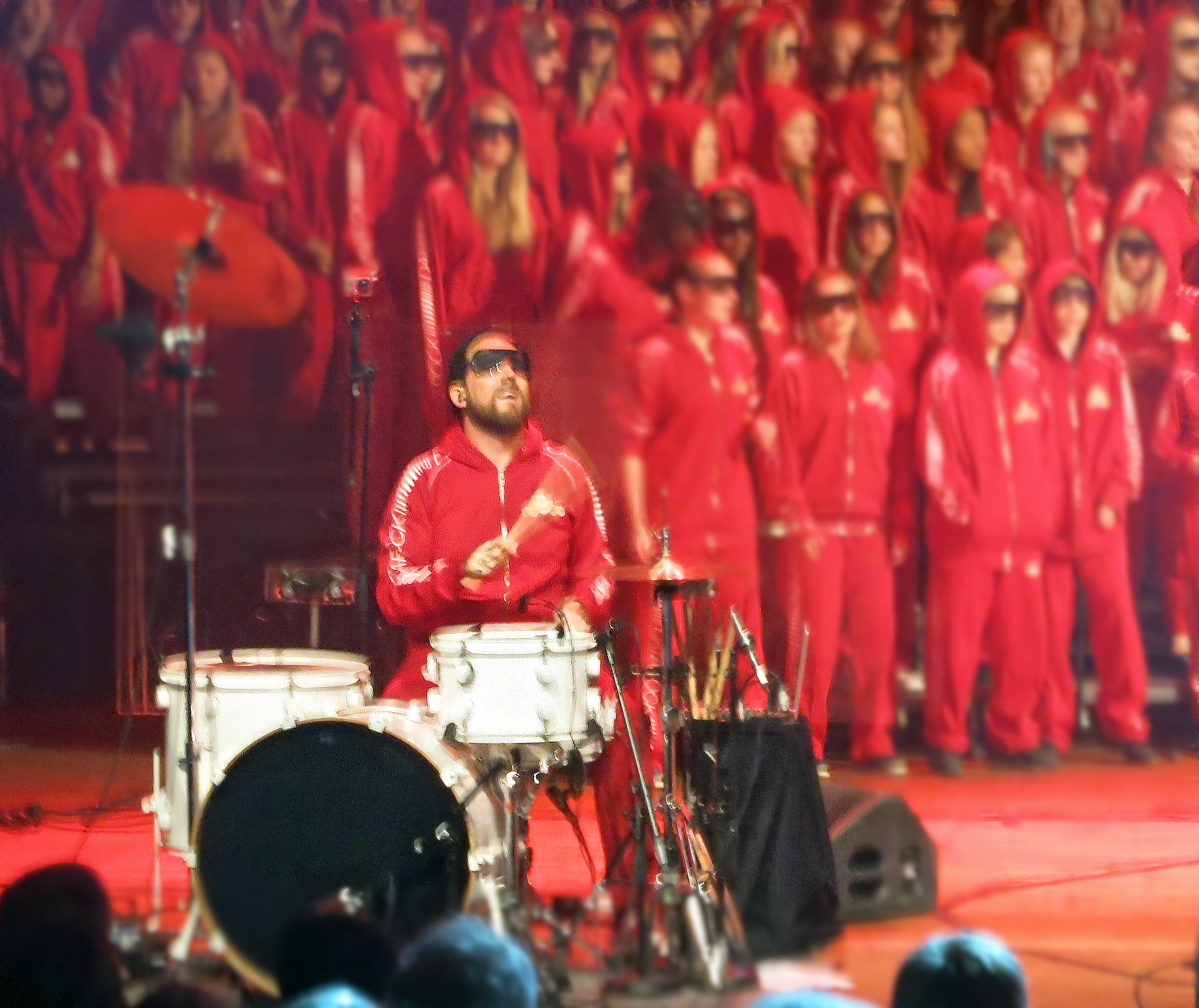
With Datarock

== Discography (in selection) ==
=== Within Ralph Myerz and the Jack Herren Band ===
- 1999: Nikita – single (Tellé Records)
- 1999: Brave New World – single (Tellé Records)
- 2002: A Special EP (Emperor Norton Records)
- 2003: A Special Album (Emperor Norton Records)
- 2004: Your New Best Friends (Emperor Norton Records)
- 2006: Sharp Knives & Loaded Guns (EMI Records)

=== Within Datarock ===
- 2009: Red (Young Aspiring Professionals)

=== Collaborations ===
==== With Kings of Convenience ====
- 2000: Kings of Convenience (Kindercore Records)
- 2001: Quiet Is The New Loud (Virgin Records)

==== With Magnet ====
- 2003: On Your Side (Sony Music Japan)

==== With Julian Berntzen ====
- 2003: Waffy Town (Sony Music)
- 2004: Pictures in the House Where She Lives (Universal Music Norway)

==== With Ephemera ====
- 2004: Monolove (Ephemera Records)

==== With Christine Sandtorv ====
- 2006: First Last Dance (Ephemera Records)

==== With Maria Mena ====
- 2013: Weapon in Mind (Sony Music)
