= Shimmering, Warm and Bright =

Studio album by Bel Canto
- Released: 1992
- Genre: Dream pop, synthpop, new-age
- Length: 47:44
- Label: Crammed Discs Columbia/SME Records (France); 471259 Dali/Chameleon/Elektra Records; 61412

Bel Canto chronology
| Birds of Passage (1989) | Shimmering, Warm and Bright (1992) | Magic Box (1996) |

Shimmering, Warm and Bright is the third album by the Norwegian band Bel Canto.

== Reception ==
Professional ratings
Review scores
| Source | Rating |
|---|---|
| AllMusic | 4.5/5 stars |

AllMusic awarded the album 4.5 stars.

== Track listing ==
1. "Unicorn" (Drecker, Johansen) – 5:19
2. "Summer" (Drecker, Johansen) – 4:47
3. "Die Geschichte einer Mutter" (Drecker, Johansen) – 6:53
4. "Waking Will" (Drecker, Johansen) – 5:16
5. "Shimmering, Warm and Bright" (Drecker, Johansen) – 3:18
6. "Sleep in Deep" (Drecker, Johansen) – 2:58
7. "Buthania" (Drecker, Johansen) – 2:39
8. "Le Temps dégagé" (Drecker, Johansen) – 4:43
9. "Spiderdust" (Drecker, Johansen) – 3:59
10. "Mornixuur" (Drecker, Johansen) – 7:49

== Personnel ==
- Anneli Marian Drecker – Vocals
- Nils Johansen – Programming
- Andreas Eriksen - Piano, percussion
- Luc van Lieshout – Trumpet, flugelhorn
- Ulf Holand - Engineer
- Rune Lindquist - Engineer
- Erik Avnskog - Engineer
- Nils Johansen and Anneli M. Drecker - Producers
