= Julian Berntzen =

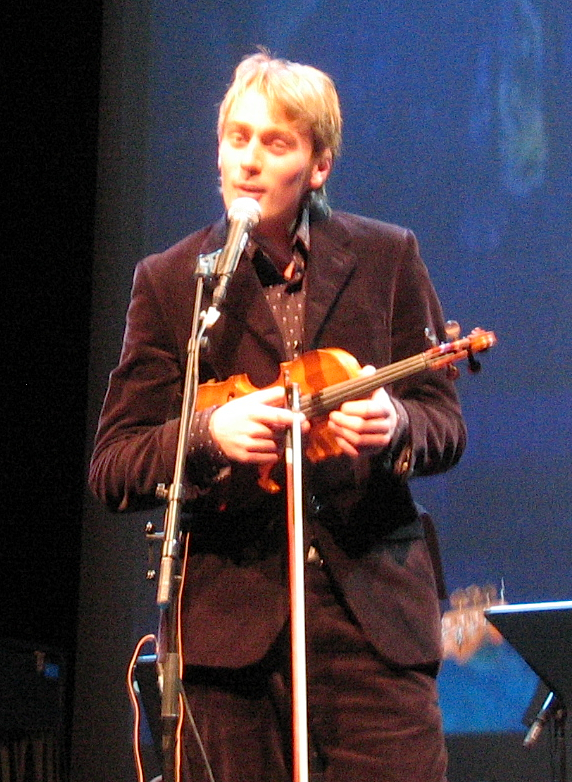

Background information
- Born: 2 February 1981 (age 45); Bergen, Norway
- Genres: Pop
- Occupations: Musician, composer
- Instruments: Vocals, piano, violin
- Website: julianberntzen.com

Julian Berntzen (born 2 February 1981) is a Norwegian vocalist, pianist, violinist and composer known for his Magnetic North Orchestra. He is the son of artist and guitarist Lasse Berntzen, and the grandson of actor Rolf Berntzen.

== Career ==
Berntzen was born in Bergen, and began playing several instruments at an early age. At 17, several of his compositions for string quartet, was performed by members of the Bergen Philharmonic Orchestra. He toured in 2001 with musicians from Steiner schools in South Africa and Norway, and was the driving force behind the release of an album with concert recordings from this project.

Berntzen did not compose pop music until he was 20 years old. Then he sat down and composed Waffy Town, a city with colorful and exciting characters. Exactly a year later he gave his first concert with samples from this fictional town, the album Waffy Town was released on the label New Records. The recordings were made in Gjøa Studio in Bergen, while the mastering was done by Nick Webb at Abbey Road Studios in London. Producer Hans Petter Gundersen and Kato Ådland played the bass and guitars, and Tarjei Strøm (from Ralph Myerz & The Jack Herren Band) played the drums. The rest – a dozen instruments, and numerous vocal orders – was made by Berntzen himself. As much as the music was mesmerizing, the cover of blinding: Lasse Berntzen had packed the disc into a 40-page book in CD format, with a number of old photographs and style right colors that helped to enhance the listening experience. The album received Spellemannprisen 2003 (Norwegian Grammy), as this year's newcomer and was nomimert for the Best Male Pop Singer the same year. The follow-up developed on this idea.

Lately Berntzen has composed music for The Snow Queen, a play by Hans Christian Andersen, put up on Den Nationale Scene, Bergen, in October 2012.

== Album list ranking ==
- 2003 VG-lista: 4 weeks, No. 12 as best: Waffy Town
- 2004 VG-lista: 1 week, No. 22 as best: Pictures (In The House Where She Lives)
- 2008 VG-lista: 2 weeks, No. 14 as best: Rocketship Love

== Honors ==
- Spellemannprisen 2003 for Waffy Town (2003), as this year's Newcomer

== Discography ==
- Waffy Town (New Records, 2003)
- Pictures (In The House Where She Lives) (Universal Music, 2004)
- Rocket Ship Love (Vertigo/Universal Music, 2008)

Awards
Preceded by Gåte	Recipient of the Newcomer Spellemannprisen; 2003	Succeeded by Annie
