= Gaute Barlindhaug =

Norwegian electronic musician

- Also known as: Kolar Goi
- Born: 1975
- Origin: Tromsø, Norway
- Genres: Electronic
- Formerly of: Aedena Cycle
- Website: www.kolargoi.com

Gaute Barlindhaug is an electronic musician from Tromsø, Norway. He is currently known under the artist name Kolar Goi.

== Career ==
As a member of the quartet Aedena Cycle, together with Torbjørn Brundtland and Svein Berge from Röyksopp, and Kolbjørn Lyslo, he was a part of the second generation of the Tromsø techno scene. In 1994, they released the acclaimed The Travellers’ Dream EP on the Belgium record label Apollo. A few compilations contributions and some rare live appearances followed, before the members went in different directions.

In the years to follow, Barlindhaug contributed to notable Tromsø acts, such as Alanïa and Drum Island.

In 1997, Aedena Cycle resurfaced as a solo project from Gaute Barlindhaug. Barlindhaug released two albums on Beatservice Records as Aedena Cycle. The album Albite came out in 1997 and Cargo Cult was released in 1999. Due to copyright reasons, Gaute Barlindhaug had to change his artist name to Kolar Goi.

As Kolar Goi, Barlindhaug has released the 12" Space Ballad in 2001 and the self-titled album Kolar Goi in 2003. Barlindhaug is involved in the Insomnia Festival in Tromsø, one of the largest and most important festivals for electronic music in Norway.

In 2010, under the identity of "Gaute", Barlindhaug released a collaborative album with musician Nasra as "Nasra and Gaute", titled "Sound of Swosh".

== See also ==
- Alanïa
- Aedena Cycle
- Drum Island
- Insomnia Festival
- Röyksopp
- Beatservice Records
