= Magic Box (Bel Canto album) =

1996 studio album by Bel Canto

Studio album by Bel Canto
- Released: 27 February 1996
- Genres: Folk; ambient
- Length: 50:32
- Label: Lava/Atlantic
- Producers: Bel Canto; Mark Ferda; Ulf Holand; Jah Wobble

Bel Canto chronology
Birds of Passage (1992)	Magic Box (1996)	Rush (1998)

Magic Box is the fourth studio album by Norwegian band Bel Canto, released on 27 February 1996 by Lava Records and Atlantic Records.

== Reception ==
Professional ratings
Review scores
Source	Rating
AllMusic	4/5 stars
Dagbladet	5/6 stars

AllMusic awarded the album 4 stars, and the Dagbladet reviewer Øyvind Rønning awarded the album dice 5.

== Track listing ==
No.	Title	Length
1.	"The Magic Box I"	1:21
2.	"In Zenith"	5:32
3.	"Freelunch in the Jungle"	4:15
4.	"Rumour"	5:25
5.	"Sleepwalker"	4:49
6.	"Bombay"	3:53
7.	"Paradise"	5:13
8.	"Didn't You Know It?"	4:21
9.	"Big Belly Butterflies"	4:51
10.	"Kiss of Spring"	4:23
11.	"The Magic Box II"	5:12

== Personnel ==
=== Musicians ===
- Anneli Marian Drecker – vocals, keyboards
- Nils Johansen – guitar, mandolin, violin, programming
- Eivind Aarset – guitar
- Nils Petter Molvær – trumpet
- B.J. Cole – steel guitar
- Jah Wobble – bass, breathing
- Dinesh – tablas
- Fazal Qureshi – ablas
- Andreas Eriksen – percussion
- Jaki Liebezeit – drums
- Chuck Frazier – background vocals

=== Technical ===
- Hans Grottheim – engineering
- Per Martinsen – engineering assistance
- Ken Theodorsen – engineering assistance
- Mark Ferda – engineering, mixing, production
- Ulf Holand – engineering, mixing, production
- Jah Wobble – production
- Bel Canto – production
- Brenda Rotheiser – art direction, design

== Charts ==
=== Weekly charts ===
Chart performance
Chart (1996)	Peak position
Norwegian Albums (VG-lista)	1

=== Year-end charts ===
Annual chart rankings
Chart (1996)	Rank
Norwegian Albums (VG-lista)	20

== Certifications ==
Certifications for Magic Box
Region	Certification	Certified units/sales
Norway (IFPI Norway)	Gold	25,000^{*}
^{*} Sales figures based on certification alone.
