= The Donca Matic Singalongs =

Studio album by Xploding Plastix
- Released: September 15, 2003
- Genres: Electronica, trip hop
- Length: 49:56
- Label: Columbia

Xploding Plastix chronology
The Benevolent Volume Lurkings (2003)	The Donca Matic Singalongs (2003)	Treated Timber Resists Rot (2008)

The Donca Matic Singalongs is the second album by Norwegian big beat duo Xploding Plastix, released on Columbia Records in 2003. It features guest vocals by Eek-A-Mouse and Sarah Cracknell.

== Track listing ==
1. "Donca Matic" - 5:06
2. "Geigerteller" - 4:22
3. "The Cave In Proper" - 4:39
4. "The Snarling Amble" (Feat. Eek-A-Mouse) - 4:45
5. "Sunset Spirals" (Feat. Sarah Cracknell) - 3:32
6. "Tripwire" - 4:41
7. "One Bullet Fits All" - 5:30
8. "The Famous Biting Guy" - 3:44
9. "Dizzy Blonde" - 5:32
10. "Cashmere Tarmac" - 4:20
11. "Huncher" - 3:47
