= Morning Star (Flunk album) =

Studio album by Flunk
- Released: May 10, 2004 (Norway); August 9, 2004 (UK/Worldwide); October 19, 2004 (US)
- Genre: Electronic
- Label: Beatservice Records (Norway/UK/Worldwide); BS074CD (CD); Kriztal Entertainment (US); KRI-CD-3031 (CD)
- Producer: Flunk

Professional ratings
Review scores
Source	Rating
PopMatters	6/10 stars

Morning Star is the second album by Norwegian electronic band Flunk released in 2004 on Beatservice Records. A later version with a revised track listing featured additional songs and was released in the United States by Kriztal Entertainment. The additional songs included "Play" which was featured in an episode of The O.C.; it subsequently appeared on Music from the OC: Mix 4. The additional songs were re-released by Beatservice Records on the EP Play America.

== Track listing ==
=== Beatservice version ===
1. "Morning Star"
2. "On My Balcony"
3. "Spring to Kingdom Come"
4. "Six Seven Times"
5. "All Day and All of the Night" (Kinks cover)
6. "I've Been Waiting All My Life to Leave You (Country Song)"
7. "Blind My Mind"
8. "Everything Is Ending Here"
9. "Kemikal Girl"

=== Kriztal version ===
1. "Play"
2. "Morning Star"
3. "On My Balcony"
4. "Spring to Kingdom Come"
5. "Six Seven Times"
6. "I've Been Waiting All My Life to Leave You (Country Song)"
7. "Blind My Mind"
8. "True Faith" (live studio recording)
9. "Skysong"
10. "Probably"
11. "All My Dreams on Hold"
12. "Everything Is Ending Here"
13. "Kemikal Girl"
