= Kokning =

Studio album by Bjørn Torske
- Released: November 2, 2010
- Length: 52:01
- Label: Smalltown Supersound

Bjørn Torske chronology
Feil Knapp (2007)	Kokning (2010)	Byen (July 6, 2018)

Professional ratings
Review scores
Source	Rating
AllMusic	4/5 stars
Fact Magazine	3.5/5 stars
Pitchfork	8/10

Kokning is the fourth studio album by Norwegian musician Bjørn Torske. It was released in December 2010 under Smalltown Supersound.

== Track listing ==
No.	Title	Length
1.	"Kokning"	3:17
2.	"Bryggesjau"	3:50
3.	"Gullfjellet"	7:13
4.	"Bergensere"	2:19
5.	"Nitten Nitti"	6:44
6.	"Versjon Wolfenstein"	7:55
7.	"Slitte Sko"	5:00
8.	"Langt Fra Afrika"	3:31
9.	"Furu"	12:12
