= Frolic (album) =

2005 studio album by Anneli Drecker

Studio album by Anneli Drecker
- Released: 4 April 2005
- Studios: Zabla Kabla; Shabby Equipment; Feedelity; High Above; Malfeitor Labratooriet
- Genre: Electropop
- Length: 40:53
- Label: Capitol
- Producers: Gaute Barlindhaug; Anneli Drecker; Raymond Hansen; Richard Lowe

Anneli Drecker chronology
Tundra (2000)	Frolic (2005)	Rocks & Straws (2015)

Frolic is the second solo studio album by Norwegian singer Anneli Drecker, released on 4 April 2005, by Capitol Records.

== Background ==
Drecker now releases the downtempo album Frolic with clear roots in the pure synth-pop. She is, however, not rooted there, but developed with today's more diverse soundscape within the genre electronica.

== Critical reception ==
Professional ratings
Review scores
Source	Rating
Aftenposten	4/6 stars
Dagbladet	3/6 stars
Verdens Gang	4/6 stars

Robert Hoftun Gjestad of the Norwegian newspaper Aftenposten awarded the album grade 4, the reviewer Øyvind Rønning of the Norwegian newspaper Dagbladet awarded the album dice 3, and the Verdens Gang review awarded the album dice 4.

== Track listing ==
All lyrics and music by Anneli Drecker, except where noted.

No.	Title	Lyrics	Music	Producer(s)	Length
1.	"You Don't Have to Change"			Drecker; Svein Berge^{[a]}; Torbjørn Brundtland^{[a]}	3:21
2.	"Safe Now"			Drecker; Gaute Barlindhaug; Gareth Jones^{[b]}	4:04
3.	"My Emily"			Drecker; Jones^{[b]}	4:07
4.	"Stop This"			Drecker; Barlindhaug	3:57
5.	"Strange Little Bird"			Drecker; Raymond Hansen	4:52
6.	"Painted Black"			Drecker; Barlindhaug	4:10
7.	"Desire"			Drecker; Hans-Peter Lindstrøm^{[a]}	3:43
8.	"Angel Bossanova"	Drecker; William Hut		Drecker; Lowe^{[b]}; Jonas Lie Theis^{[b]}	4:08
9.	"The Monkey Trap"		Drecker; Neil Arthur; Stephen Luscombe	Drecker; Jones^{[b]}	4:18
10.	"Interlude"			Drecker; Lowe	0:03
11.	"Cool World"			Drecker; Hansen	3:33

=== Notes ===
- ^{^[a]} signifies a co-producer
- ^{^[b]} signifies an additional producer

== Charts ==
Chart performance for Frolic
Chart (2005)	Peak position
Norwegian Albums (VG-lista)	7
