= Anneli Drecker =

Norwegian singer and actress

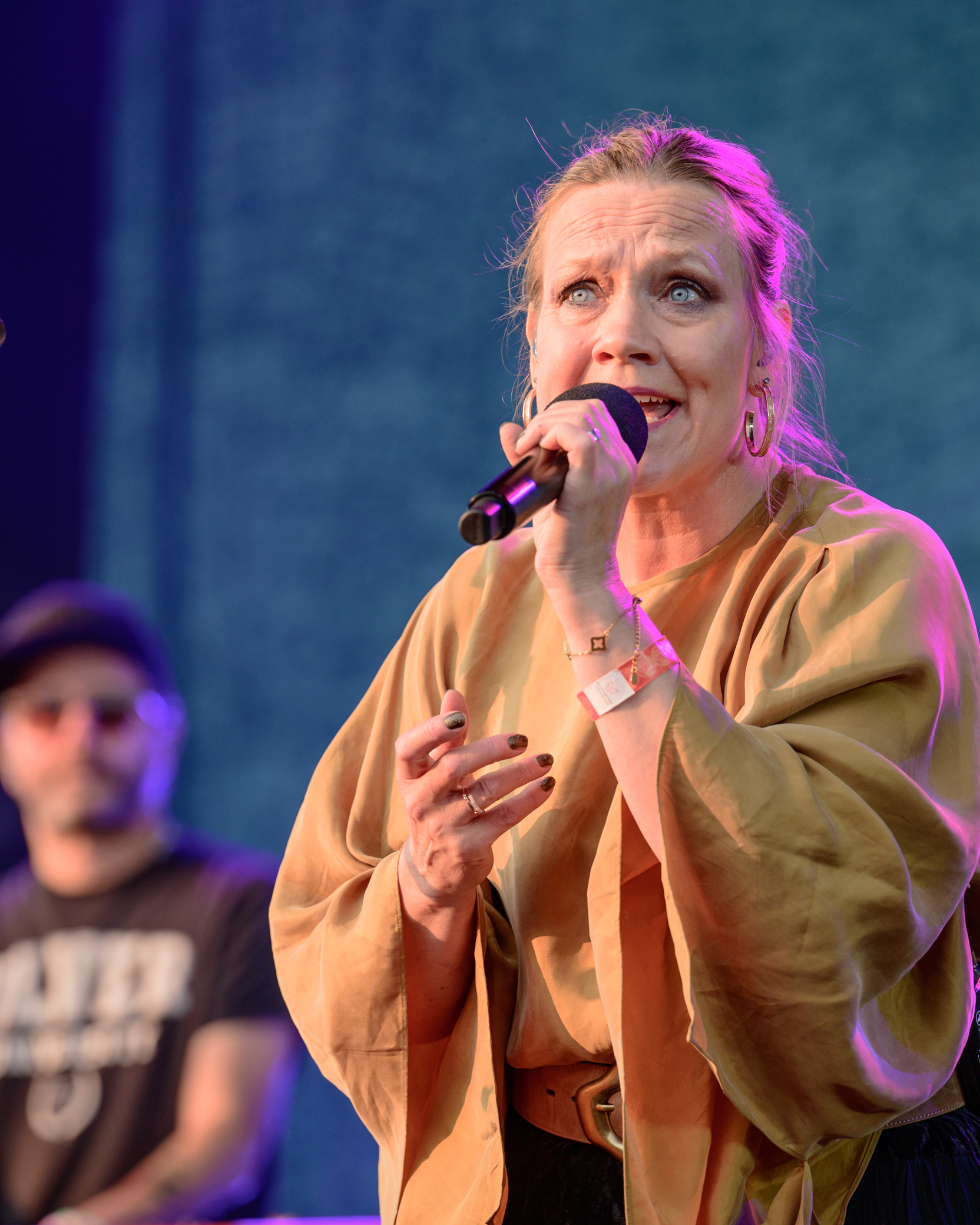
- Drecker in 2024

Background information
- Born: Anneli Marian Drecker; 12 February 1969 (age 57); Tromsø, Norway
- Genres: Electronica, pop, jazz
- Occupations: Musician, actor, vocalist
- Instruments: Vocals, keyboards
- Labels: EMI Records; Capitol/EMI Records; Rune Grammofon
- Member of: Bel Canto
- Website: www.annelidrecker.com

Anneli Marian Drecker (born 12 February 1969, in Tromsø, Norway) is a Norwegian singer and actress from the city of Tromsø. She is the frontwoman for the dream pop band Bel Canto.

== Life and career ==
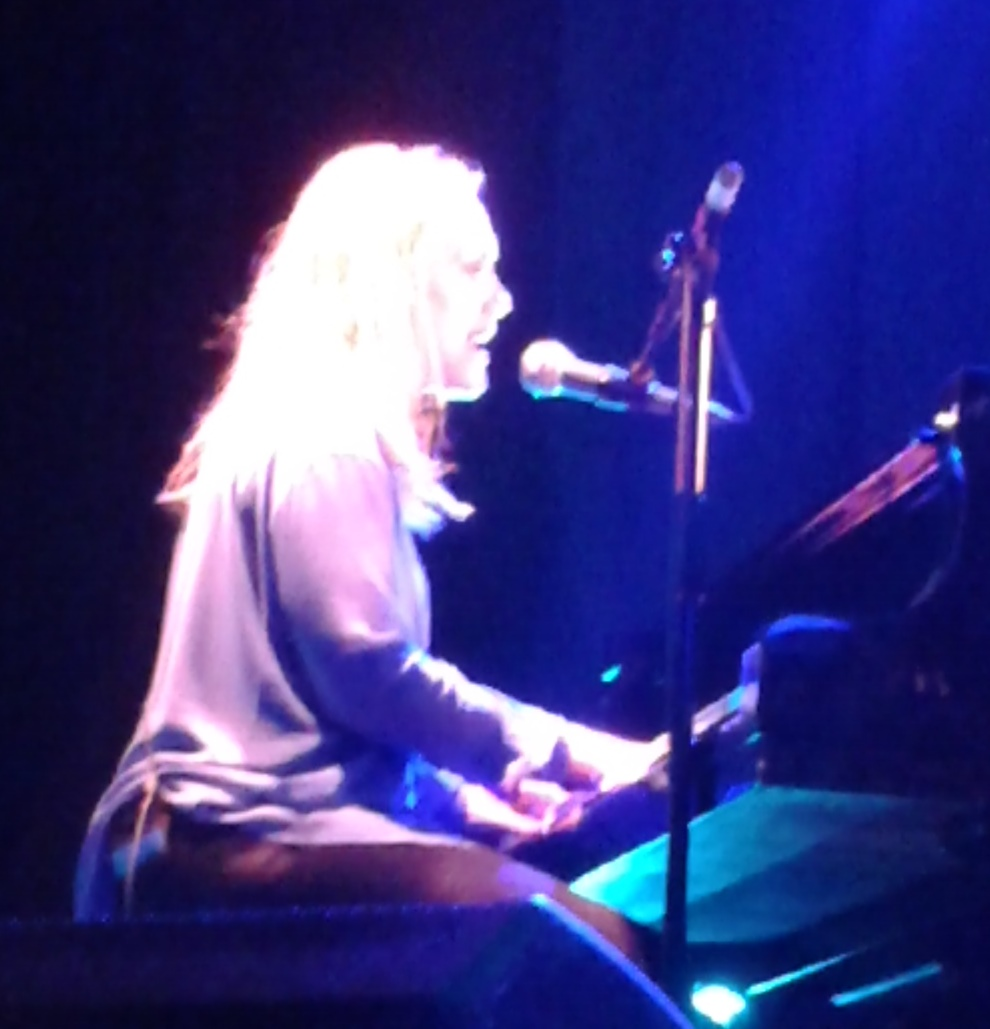
Anneli Drecker at Vossajazz March 2015.

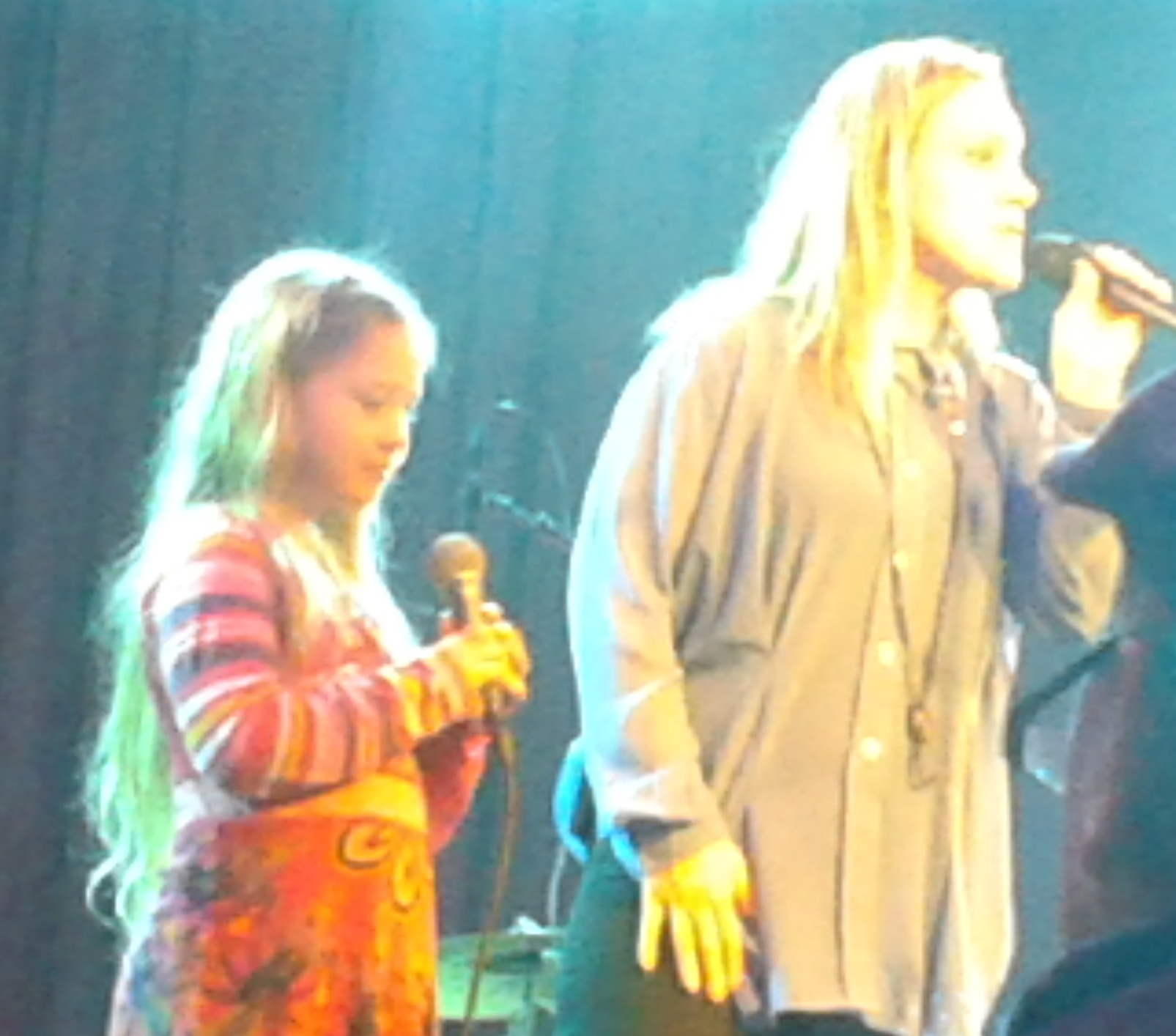
Anneli Drecker live with her daughter Luna at Vossajazz 2015.

Drecker's father Peter, a German from Bielefeld, emigrated in 1960 to Norway. Peter Drecker and his son, Per-Arne Drecker are known for their optician business called "Drecker optikk" with up to 14 stores. Drecker Optikk is now one store in Tromso called Drecker Design, as the other stores where sold to a chain in 2010.

In the fall of 2007 Bel Canto celebrated the twentieth anniversary of the first album with several concerts. She has released four solo albums, and has provided vocals for various artists including Motorpsycho, Jan Bang, Savoy, a-ha, Röyksopp, Jah Wobble, Ketil Bjørnstad, Simon Raymonde, Mental Overdrive, Illumination and Hector Zazou.

Drecker contributed as composer and singer in a production of Pär Lagerkvist's Bøddelen at Det Norske Teatret (2000), and has worked as a freelance actress and composer at Hålogaland Teater from 2009 to 2020.

She worked with fellow Norwegians Röyksopp, since 1999-2012 including as the vocalist on the track "Sparks" and as their live vocalist (as heard on their live album Royksopp's Night Out), on three songs on their album Junior. Additionally, she appeared with countrymen a-ha on their Minor Earth, Major Sky Tour and appeared on the live DVD Live from Vallhall and the following album from their European Tour, How Can I Sleep With Your Voice In My Head..

In 2004 she was a jury member in the Norwegian version of Pop Idol. She continues to occasionally perform live in Norway. In 2012 Drecker took part in the NRK TV-show Stjernekamp, first season. In 2014 she appeared again on TV2 as one of the artists in the famous series "Hver Gang Vi Møtes".

On her latest album Rocks And Straws (2015) we are given the home reversion of a journey that began in 1986 with Bel Canto. During the journey, it became increasingly clearer to Drecker where she comes from, and the music she creates is the result of this Nordic arctic acoustic landscape, with influences of music from all around the world. She has composed the music with lyrics based on poems by the Northern Norwegian poet Arvid Hanssen. At the Vossajazz festival 2015, Drecker performed the tune "Little Tree" from this album, with her daughter Luna (b. 2006).

== Honors ==
- 1992: Spellemannprisen in the category Pop, with Bel Canto for the album Shimmering, Warm and Bright
- 1996: Spellemannprisen in the categories Band and Dance/techno, with Bel Canto for the album Magic Box
- 2007: Nordlysprisen
- 2008: Gammlengprisen in Open class

== Filmography ==
- 1983: Søsken på Guds jord as Margit, by Laila Mikkelsen
- 1992: Svarte pantere as Sonia, by Thomas Robsahm
- 2000: De 7 dødssyndene, by Ø. Karlsen, M. Olin, M. Sødahl, F. Mosvold & L. Gud

== Theatre ==
- 2000: "Bøddelen"/ "The executioner" (as archangel), from Pär Lagerkvist, directed by Yngve Sundvor at Det Norske Teatret
- 2004:" "Peer Gynt" (as Solveig) The North Norwegian Theater Company, directed by Alex Scherpf- Tromsø, Meieriet 2004
- 2009: "Hamsun's Feberr" / "Hamsun's Fever" (as Alvhilde), directed by Jon Tombre-Hålogaland Teater, homepage review in Nordlys, review in ITromsø
- 2010: "Vi Hever Våre Hoder I Skam"/ "We Raise Our Heads In Shame", directed by Kristin Eriksen Bjorn and Jon Tombre - Ferske Scener, Tromsø
- 2011: "Knutby" (as Åsa Waldau, The Bride of Christ), directed by Kjersti horn -Hålogaland Teater, homepage,
- 2011: "The Black Rider" (musical with music from Tom Waits), directed by Sigrid Reibo- Hålogaland Teater, homepage
- 2012: "Blikktrommen" / "The Tin Drum", (as the mother of Oscar; Agnes) from Günter Grass, directed by Jon Tombre -Hålogaland Teater, homepage
- 2014: The Operetta "Kiberg Odyssey" (as Penelope) together with Arctic Philharmonic Orchestra (NOSO), music Composed by Trygve Brøske, directed by Ivar Tindberg, homepage,press pictures on flickr
- 2015: "Trollmannen fra Oz" / "The Wizard of Oz", (as Toto, the dog, Dorothy' s best friend) from L. Frank Baum, directed by Jon Tombre, music by Snah Motorpsycho - Hålogaland Teater, homepage

== Discography ==
=== Solo albums ===
- 2000: Tundra (EMI Music)
- 2005: Frolic (Capitol Records)
- 2015: Rocks and Straws (Rune Grammofon), lyrics by Roy-Frode Løvland, based on poems by Arvid Hanssen
- 2017: Revelation for Personal Use (Rune Grammofon)

=== Singles ===
From Tundra

- 2000: "It's All Here"
- 2000: "Sexy Love"
- 2000: "All I Know"

From Frolic

- 2005: "Stop This"
- 2005: "You Don't Have To Change"

From Rocks & Straws

- 2015: "Circulating Light"
- 2015: "Come Summer's Wind" ( radio single )

=== Music videos ===
- 2005: "You Don´t Have To Change"
- 2015: "Alone" official video on vimeo

=== Bel Canto ===
- 1987: White-Out Conditions (Crammed Discs)
- 1989: Birds of Passage (Crammed Discs) (Nettwerk Productions in North America)
- 1992: Shimmering, Warm and Bright (Crammed Discs) (Dali/Chameleon/Elektra Records in North America) (Columbia/SME Records in France)
- 1996: Magic Box (Lava/Atlantic)
- 1998: Rush (EMI Records)
- 2001: Retrospect (WEA Records), compilation album
- 2002: Dorothy's Victory (EMI Records)

=== Collaborations ===
- 1989: Song Of Joy (Crammed Discs), by Tsunematsu Matsui featuring Anneli Marian Drecker
- 1989: East On Fire (Crammed Discs), by Foreign Affair featuring Anneli Drecker & Apoptygma Berzerker on the tracks "Ghosts Can't Run Away", "Diversion", "Misunderstanding", "Keep Me In", "The Same"
- 1992: Sahara Blue (Crammed Discs), by Hector Zazou featuring Anneli Drecker and Gérard Depardieu on the track "I'll Strangle You"
- 1994: Take Me To God (Island), by Jah Wobble's Invaders Of The Heart featuring Anneli Drecker on the tracks "Becoming More Like God", "When The Storm Comes"
- 1994: Timothy's Monster (EMI), by Motorpsycho on the track "The Golden Core"
- 1995: Mantra For Peace (Warner Elektra Atlantic), by Music Channel
- 1997: Sou (King) by Inoran featuring Anneli Drecker on the track "Monsoon Baby"
- 2000: Sing a Song for You (Manifesto), with Simon Raymonde for the tribute to Tim Buckley on the track "Morning Glory"
- 2001: Grace (EmArcy) by Ketil Bjørnstad (Recorded live at Vossajazz, 2000) (text: John Donne, 1562–1626)
- 2001: Melody A.M. (Wall of Sound), by Röyksopp on the track "Sparks"
- 2002: Lifelines (Warner Elektra Atlantic), by a-ha on the track "Turn the Lights Down"
- 2003: The Nest (Emarcy), by Ketil Bjørnstad (featured vocalist on a number of songs)
- 2005: You and Me Against the World (GUN), by Apoptygma Berzerk on the track "Back on Track"
- 2008: Tome 2 1987 - 1995 (Infrastition), by Complot Bronswick (featured vocalist on a number of songs)
- 2009: Junior (Wall of Sound), by Röyksopp on the tracks "Vision One", "You Don't Have a Clue", "True to Life"
- 2018: A Suite Of Poems (ECM), by Ketil Bjørnstad featuring Anneli Drecker
- 2022: Between Hotels And Time (Grappa), with Ketil Bjørnstad and Lars Saabye Christensen

Awards
Preceded by Jan Gunnar Hoff	Recipient of the Nordlysprisen; 2007	Succeeded by Ragnar Rasmussen
Preceded by Lene Marlin	Recipient of the Open class Gammleng-prisen; 2008	Succeeded by Malika Makouf Rasmussen
