= Rush (Bel Canto album) =

1998 studio album by Bel Canto

Studio album by Bel Canto
- Released: 22 February 1998
- Genre: Dream pop; synth-pop; new-age
- Length: 50:56
- Label: EMI
- Producer: Anneli Drecker; Nils Johansen; Torbjørn Brundtland

Bel Canto chronology
Magic Box (1996)	Rush (1998)	Dorothy's Victory (2002)

Rush (released as Images in France) is the fifth studio album by Norwegian band Bel Canto, released on 22 February 1998 by EMI.

== Reception ==
Professional ratings
Review scores
Source	Rating
Dagbladet	5/6 stars
Verdens Gang	5/6 stars

Dagbladet reviewer Håkon Moslet awarded the album dice 5, and Verdens Gang reviewer Stein Østbø also awarded the album dice 5.

== Track listing ==
No.	Title	Length
1.	"Images"	3:36
2.	"All I Want to Do"	4:52
3.	"Spacejunk"	3:57
4.	"Verena"	3:11
5.	"Idly I De-Ice"	4:54
6.	"Nornagest"	0:43
7.	"Rush"	4:32
8.	"99% of Me"	3:01
9.	"The Dinosaur-Slipper Man"	3:26
10.	"Hearts Unite"	4:38
11.	"Sun"	5:45
12.	"Here, in Shadow"	2:41
13.	"Heaven"	5:40

== Personnel ==
=== Musicians ===
- Anneli Marian Drecker – vocals, two-handed tambourine
- Nils Johansen – guitar, violin, keyboards, bass, percussion, synthesizer Dx-7, programming
- Kirsti Nyutstumo – bass
- Ulf W.Ø. Holand – vocals
- Julian Briottet – vocals
- Torbjørn Brundtland – keyboards, percussion, one-finger tambourine, sampler
- Andreas Eriksen – drums, percussion, tablas
- Morten Lund – percussion

=== Technical ===
- Anneli Drecker, Nils Johansen, Torbjørn Brundtland – production
- Morten Lund – engineering
- Frode-André Kristiansen, Julian Briottet – engineering, mixing
- Ulf W. Ø. Holand, Nils Johansen, Anneli Drecker – mixing

== Charts ==
Chart performance for Rush
Chart (1998)	Peak position
Norwegian Albums (VG-lista)	2
