= Treated Timber Resists Rot =

Studio album by Xploding Plastix
- Released: 2008
- Genre: Electronica

Xploding Plastix chronology
The Donca Matic Singalongs (2003)	Treated Timber Resists Rot (2008)

Treated Timber Resists Rot is the third studio album by Norwegian electronic music duo Xploding Plastix.

== Track listing ==
1. "Kissed by a Kisser" - 6:46
2. "Errata" - 4:44
3. "The Rigamarole Shell Out" - 3:50
4. "A Rogue Friend is a Wild Beast" - 5:31
5. "The Cost of Resistance" - 5:27
6. "Joyous Insolence" - 5:51
7. "The Full Graft" - 5:11
8. "Bulldozer Butterfly" - 4:22
9. "Austere Faultlines" - 5:03
10. "Band of Miscreants" - 5:32
11. "Arts of Exit" - 4:23
12. "I Want My Violence Back" - 5:24
