= Kolbjørn Lyslo =

Norwegian musician

- Also known as: Doc L Junior, Koolbear
- Born: Kolbjørn Lyslo; 1975 (age 50–51); Tromsø, Norway
- Origin: Tromsø, Norway
- Genres: House
- Occupations: DJ and producer
- Years active: 1994-present

Kolbjørn Lyslo (born 1975) is a Norwegian musician from Tromsø, Norway, although he moved to Oslo in 1994. He produces house music under the name of Doc L Junior (short for Doctor Lyslo Junior). He is a former member of band Aedena Cycle, and he has released several 12" records under the UK label Music for Freaks. Kolbjørn has also released one single with Bjørn Torske under the name of Krater, and has released one single with the band Pizzy Yelliot.

== Releases ==
=== As Doc L Junior ===
- How Ya Doin' (2000)
- Dubs You Crazy With Peace EP (2001)
- Just an E (2003)
- Footnotes 3 (2009)

=== As Koolbear ===
- Live Your Life (1998)

=== As member of Aedena Cycle ===
- Traveller's Dream EP (1994)

=== As member of Krater ===
- Alpenmorgen (2002)

=== As member of Pizzy Yelliot ===
- Could You Be Loved (2005)
