= Tundra (Anneli Drecker album) =

2000 studio album by Anneli Drecker

Studio album by Anneli Drecker
- Released: 27 March 2000
- Venue: Tromsø Kulturhus (Tromsø) (Note: Track 11)
- Studios: Bugge's Room (Oslo) (Note: Vocals on tracks 1–4); Smecky (Prague) (Note: Orchestra on tracks 1, 4, 6, 9 and 10); September Sound (Eel Pie Island, London) (Note: Track 5); MyOohMeYeah (Note: Vocals on tracks 6–10); Vinderen (Note: Vocals on track 7)
- Genre: Electropop
- Length: 47:02
- Label: EMI
- Producers: Anneli Drecker; Simon Raymonde

Anneli Drecker chronology
Tundra (2000)	Frolic (2005)

Tundra is the debut solo studio album by Norwegian singer Anneli Drecker, released on 27 March 2000 by EMI.

== Background ==
Tundra gives an excursion into a more diverse soundscape within the genres electronica and rock. After the international efforts of Bel Canto stranded in the second half of the 1990s, it seems quite natural that she start a solo career.

== Reception ==
Professional ratings
Review scores
Source	Rating
Dagbladet	4/6 stars

The reviewer Håkon Molset of the Norwegian newspaper Dagbladet awarded the album dice 4.

== Track listing ==
All lyrics and music by Anneli Drecker, except "Tundra (Mánaiga)" (lyrics by Lawra Somby and Drecker) and "Song of the Sky Loom" (lyrics from a Native American poem from Tewa).

No.	Title	Length
1.	"All I Know"	5:22
2.	"Sexy Love"	3:35
3.	"Fire Alarm"	4:23
4.	"Who on Earth"	3:26
5.	"Woebegone"	4:22
6.	"Tundra (Mánaiga)"	4:25
7.	"Trinitron"	4:05
8.	"It's All Here"	3:14
9.	"Still Waters"	4:53
10.	"Rainstorm"	6:04
11.	"Song of the Sky Loom" (live)	2:57

== Personnel ==
=== Musicians ===
- Anneli Drecker – vocals (all tracks); keyboards (tracks 1–4, 6–10); programming (tracks 1–8, 10); orchestral arrangement (tracks 1, 10, 11); string arrangement (tracks 4, 5); grand piano (track 9)
- Torbjørn Brundtland – programming (tracks 1, 2, 6, 8, 9); FX (tracks 1, 6); keyboards (tracks 2, 3, 8); choir (track 7)
- Martin Horntveth – brushes (track 1); drums (track 10)
- Niels J. Røine – Jew's harp (track 1)
- Sindre Hotvedt – orchestral arrangement (tracks 1, 6, 10); transcription (tracks 1, 4–6, 9–11); additional keyboards, additional orchestral arrangement (track 4); string arrangement (track 9)
- City of Prague Philharmonic Orchestra – strings (tracks 1, 4, 6, 9, 10)
- Mario Klemens – conducting (tracks 1, 4, 6, 9, 10)
- Sjur Miljeteig – trumpet (track 3)
- Will Foster – additional string arrangement (track 5)
- Sarah Wilson – strings (track 5)
- Howard Gott – strings (track 5)
- Ruth Gottlieb – strings (track 5)
- Oliver Kraus – strings (track 5)
- Lawra Somby – joik (track 6)
- Roger Ludvigsen – runebomme (track 6)
- Röyksopp – programming (tracks 7)
- Lauren Waaktaar-Savoy – vocals, choir (track 7)
- Jon Marius Aareskjold – choir (track 7)
- Per Martinsen – soundscapes (track 7)
- Nils Petter Molvær – trumpet (track 9)
- Sivert Høyem – guest vocals (track 10)
- Hans Magnus Ryan – guitars (track 10)
- Bent Sæther – bass (track 10)
- Tromsø Symphony Orchestra – orchestra (track 11)

=== Technical ===
- Anneli Drecker – production (all tracks)
- Ulf W. Ø. Holand – mixing (tracks 1–4, 6–10)
- Nils Johansen – vocal recording (tracks 1–4, 10); vocal editing (track 1); recording, mixing (track 11)
- Jon Marius Aareskjold – Pro Tools (tracks 1–4, 6–10); vocal recording (track 7)
- Torbjørn Brundtland – co-production (tracks 2, 3, 8); additional production (track 9)
- Simon Raymonde – production, recording, mixing (track 5)
- Souvenire – vocal recording (tracks 6–10)
- Röyksopp – co-production (tracks 7)
- Trond Mikalsen – recording, mixing (track 11)

=== Artwork ===
- Anneli Drecker – art direction
- Aina Griffin – art direction, design, photography
- Marte Garmann Johnsen – Prague photos
- Iris Marie Persdotter Drecker – illustrations

== Charts ==
Chart performance for Tundra
Chart (2000)	Peak position
Norwegian Albums (VG-lista)	4
