= The Stream (TV series) =

2016 Norwegian television series

- Title card for The Stream
- Genre: Reality television
- Created by: Jørn Dahl
- Developed by: Monster Media; TV 2
- Composers: Sindre Moen; Caroline Eriksson
- Country of origin: Norway
- No. of seasons: 1
- No. of episodes: 16

Original release
- Network: TV 2
- Release: 26 August – 10 December 2016

The Stream is a reality television singing competition franchise that premiered in 2016. First aired on Norwegian TV 2, the concept started in Norway, but has been sold to the United States, where NBC will make the American version of it in the near future.

== Format ==
The show's format has five stages of competition. The first is the auditions, which is online. In 3 months the contestants can upload their online audition on the internet. The 100 contestants with most streams, will get a ticket to a showcase. The "Showcase" is the second stage. It's actually here the filming of the show begins. The three biggest record labels, Sony Music, Warner Music and Universal Music, are sending an artist from the label, who will present them as one of the three judges and artist developer. When the contestants has performed in front of the three judges, they will vote in which the contestants are going home or going to the workshop. The "Workshop" is where the contestants on short time, is going to work together. When they performed together, the judges will pick which contestants who's going to the second last stage. When the contestants are down to fifteen, they will each performer one last time for an audience. After that, each record label will pick 3 contestants, they want to sign with. The nine contestants who has signed with one of the three record labels, will perform the next week on the final stage. The "Liveshows" are the final stage, where each week they will release a cover on Spotify. In the end, the contestant with most streams, will be crowned the winner. The prize is a ticket to a showcase in Los Angeles, where the winner will get a chance, to become an international artist.

== Season 1 (2016) ==
=== Finalists ===
Key:

– Winner
– Runner-up
– Eliminated

| Label (mentor) | Acts | | |
|---|---|---|---|
| Warner (Cato Sundberg) | Ramon | Emilie Adams | ThoseBricks |
| Sony (Marion Ravn) | Maybon | Skei & PT | Sondrey |
| Universal (Espen Lind) | Ylva Olaisen | Emelie Hollow | Adrees |

=== Live shows ===
The live shows began on October 14, 2016.

==== Week 1: Opening (14 October) ====
| Order | Label | Artist | Song | Result |
|---|---|---|---|---|
| 1 | Sony | Sondrey | "Sweet Dreams" | Safe |
| 2 | Universal | Emelie Hollow | "This Years Love" | Safe |
| 3 | Warner | ThoseBricks | "Yellow" | Safe |
| 4 | Warner | Emilie Adams | "People Help the People" | Safe |
| 5 | Universal | Adrees | "We Found Love" | Safe |
| 6 | Sony | Skei & PT | "Kursiv" | Safe |
| 7 | Sony | Maybon | "Just Hold Me" | Bottom 2 |
| 8 | Universal | Ylva Olaisen | "Let Me Love You" | Safe |
| 9 | Warner | Ramon | "Arigato" | Bottom 2 |

==== Week 2 (21 October) ====
| Order | Label | Artist | Song | Result |
|---|---|---|---|---|
| 1 | Sony | Maybon | "Lovers on the Sun" | Safe |
| 2 | Sony | Skei & PT | "Målløs" | Safe |
| 3 | Universal | Ylva Olaisen | "Forever Young" | Safe |
| 4 | Warner | Emilie Adams | "The Hills" | Eliminated |
| 5 | Sony | Sondrey | "Neon" | Safe |
| 6 | Universal | Emelie Hollow | "Breathe" | Safe |
| 7 | Warner | Ramon | "Never Forget You" | Bottom 3 |
| 8 | Universal | Adrees | "The A Team" | Bottom 3 |
| 9 | Warner | ThoseBricks | "Let It Go" | Safe |

==== Week 3 (28 October) ====
| Order | Label | Artist | Song | Result |
|---|---|---|---|---|
| 1 | Warner | ThoseBricks | "Never Easy" | Safe |
| 2 | Universal | Adrees | "Hurts So Good" | Bottom 3 |
| 3 | Warner | Ramon | "Stole the Show" | Bottom 3 |
| 4 | Universal | Ylva Olaisen | "Falter" | Safe |
| 5 | Sony | Sondrey | "Fordi jeg elsker deg" | Safe |
| 6 | Sony | Maybon | "Supergirl" | Eliminated |
| 7 | Universal | Emelie Hollow | "Impossible" | Safe |
| 8 | Sony | Skei & PT | "Plystre på deg" | Safe |

==== Week 4 (4 November) ====
| Order | Label | Artist | Song | Result |
|---|---|---|---|---|
| 1 | Universal | Ylva Olaisen | "Say My Name" | Bottom 3 |
| 2 | Warner | Ramon | "Against All Odds" | Bottom 3 |
| 3 | Universal | Adrees | "Hey There Delilah" | Safe |
| 4 | Universal | Emelie Hollow | "Where Are Ü Now" | Safe |
| 5 | Sony | Skei & PT | "Etter dæ" | Safe |
| 6 | Warner | ThoseBricks | "I Won't Let You Go" | Safe |
| 7 | Sony | Sondrey | "Cold Water" | Eliminated |

==== Week 5 (11 November) ====
| Order | Label | Artist | Song | Result |
|---|---|---|---|---|
| 1 | Universal | Adrees | "Stinkin' Rich" | Eliminated |
| 2 | Sony | Skei & PT | "Kunne Vært Verre" | Safe |
| 3 | Universal | Emelie Hollow | "Save Me" | Bottom 3 |
| 4 | warner | Ramon | "Paper Cut" | Bottom 3 |
| 5 | Universal | Ylva Olaisen | "Hear You Sing" | Safe |
| 6 | Warner | ThoseBricks | "Pray For Love" | Safe |

==== Week 6 (18 November) ====
| Order | Label | Artist | Song | Result |
|---|---|---|---|---|
| 1 | Universal | Emelie Hollow | "FOOLS" | Bottom 2 |
| 2 | Warner | Ramon | "Runnin' (Lose It All)" | Eliminated |
| 3 | Universal | Ylva Olaisen | "Jealous" | Safe |
| 4 | Warner | ThoseBricks | "Going Home" | Safe |
| 5 | Sony | Skei & PT | "Idiot" | Safe |

==== Week 7 (25 November) ====
| Order | Label | Artist | Song | Result |
|---|---|---|---|---|
| 1 | Sony | Skei & PT | "Alt du gjør" | Safe |
| 2 | Universal | Ylva Olaisen | "Stay" | Bottom 2 |
| 3 | Universal | Emelie Hollow | "Heaven" | Eliminated |
| 4 | Warner | ThoseBricks | "Save Me" | Safe |

==== Week 8 (2 December) ====
| Order | Label | Artist | Song | Result |
|---|---|---|---|---|
| 1 | Sony | Skei & PT | "Bensin" | Eliminated |
| 2 | Warner | ThoseBricks | "Never Fall" | Safe |
| 3 | Universal | Ylva Olaisen | "Dear No One" | Safe |

==== Week 9: Finale (10 December) ====
| Label | Artist | Order | Song | Order | Song | Result |
|---|---|---|---|---|---|---|
| Warner | ThoseBricks | 1 | "I Won't Let You Go" | 4 | "Who I Can Be" | Winner |
| Universal | Ylva Olaisen | 2 | "Hear You Sing" | 3 | "Her" | Runner-up |

=== Overall ===
Artist's info

- Artist from Warner Music
- Artist from Sony Music
- Artist from Universal Music

Result details

- Artist was safe from elimination
- Artist was in the bottom three/two
- Artist was eliminated
- Winner
- Runner-up

Live show results per week
| Artist | Week 1 | Week 2 | Week 3 | Week 4 | Week 5 | Week 6 | Week 7 | Week 8 | Week 9 |
|---|---|---|---|---|---|---|---|---|---|
| ThoseBricks | 3. | 5. | 1. | 2. | 4. | 2. | 2. | 2. | Winner |
| Ylva Olaisen | 2. | 2. | 3. | 5. | 1. | 3. | 3. | 1. | Runner Up |
| Skei & PT | 6. | 1. | 2. | 1. | 2. | 1. | 1. | Eliminated | Eliminated in Week 8 |
| Emelie Hollow | 5. | 3. | 4. | 4. | 3. | 4. | Eliminated | Eliminated in Week 7 | |
| Ramon | 7. | 7. | 7. | 3. | 5. | Eliminated | Eliminated in Week 6 | | |
| Adrees | 4. | 6. | 6. | 6. | Eliminated | Eliminated in Week 5 | | | |
| Sondrey | 8. | 8. | 5. | Eliminated | Eliminated in Week 4 | | | | |
| Maybon | 1. | 4. | Eliminated | Eliminated in Week 3 | | | | | |
| Emilie Adams | 9. | Eliminated | Eliminated in Week 2 | | | | | | |

== Versions ==
Franchise with a currently airing season
Franchise with an upcoming season
Franchise that had ceased to air

| Country/Region | Local title | Network | Winners | A&Rs | Hosts |
|---|---|---|---|---|---|
| Norway | The Stream | TV 2 (Norway); Website | Season 1, 2016: ThoseBricks | Current; Cato Sundberg (1); Marion Raven (1); Espen Lind (1) | Current; Tarjei Strøm (1) |
| United States | The Stream | NBC | Season 1, TBA: Upcoming season | TBA | TBA |

== Awards and nominations ==
| Year | Organization | Category | Nominee(s) | Result | Ref. |
|---|---|---|---|---|---|
| 2017 | Gullruten | Innovation of the Year | —N/a | Won | |
