= The Electones =

The Electones are a Norwegian jazz/electronic/pop group, comprising musicians Jens Petter Nilsen and Hallvard Hagen (who together form Xploding Plastix), and vocalist Rita Augestad Knudsen. They have released two EPs on the UK Inertia label.

== Overview ==
The core of The Electones is Jens Petter Nilsen and Hallvard Wennersberg Hagen. Following the release of two 12"s as The Electones on the UK label Inertia in 2002 and 2003, a reviewer wrote: “Steps confidently not to mention beautifully between the realms of jazz, electronica, classical and acoustic folk. Class!” (DJ Magazine)

If You'll Be Null, I'll Be Void (2009) added the voices of Kaja Haven, Endre Bjotveit and Erland Dahlen, the latter also on drums, percussion and musical saw, plus Bjørn Charlie Dreyer and Lars Fredrik Frøislie on various instruments. Joe Barton of The Skinny described the album as situated at "a picturesque border territory between jazz, folk, and electronica" and noted that it "blends modestly into its surroundings, rather than begging for the listener’s attention."

== Discography ==
- Electricity EP – 12" EP single
- Summercloud EP – 12" EP single
- If You'll be Null, I'll Be Void LP
