= White-Out Conditions =

Studio album by Bel Canto
- Released: 1987
- Genres: Dream pop; synth-pop; new age
- Length: 36:39
- Labels: Crammed Discs; Nettwerk/EMI
- Producer: Gilles Martin

Bel Canto chronology
White-Out Conditions (1987)	Birds of Passage (1989)

Singles from White-Out Conditions
- 1. "Blank Sheets" Released: 1988; 2. "White-Out Conditions" Released: 1988

Professional ratings
Review scores
Source	Rating
Allmusic	3/5 stars

White-Out Conditions is the first album by the Norwegian band Bel Canto.

== Critical reception ==
The album was critically acclaimed and noted for the band's exotic arctic sound, a reviewer in Melody Maker writing:

"They are very much the product of their environment. Their music is produced by synthesizers and computers. It's a celebration of the archaic, natural order through the use and abuse of modern technology. Notes fall in flurries and sudden, sharp showers, a flute whistles in furious competition with the wind, there's the tinkling of iron bells, the tapping of woodblocks and distant rumblings. Kloeberdanz and Upland are enticingly pure, the former an instrumental, the latter with Anneli's voice wrapped in the rise and rise of quasi-classical motions. It's given a similar treatment elsewhere, but in the title track it's less fragile, calling for the relief of darkness, for moonlight and the accompanying roses and love, yet only finding footprints in the snow. With Baltic Ice-Breaker she scratches, screams and whines as nature again triumphs over man. With Capio it sounds like a celestial choir, as though a host of Ibsen's ghosts are in the machine. "W-O. C." is not the stuff of movies and dreams. It's a direct translation of a daily reality. A frozen exotica."

== Track listing ==
All tracks are written by Anneli Drecker, Nils Johansen and Geir Jenssen, except where noted.

No.	Title	Writer(s)	Length
1.	"Blank Sheets"		4:15
2.	"Dreaming Girl"		3:05
3.	"Without You"	Drecker; Johansen; Jenssen; "Larssen"	4:04
4.	"Capio"	Drecker; Johansen; Jenssen; Pete Knutsen	2:23
5.	"Agassiz"		3:53
6.	"Kloeberdanz"		3:02
7.	"White-Out Conditions"		4:10
8.	"Baltic Ice-Breaker"		4:45
9.	"Upland"		7:02
Total length:			36:39

1988 CD edition bonus track
No.	Title	Writer(s)	Length
10.	"Chaideinoi"	Johansen; Jenssen	3:29
Total length:			40:08

== Personnel ==
Bel Canto

- Anneli Drecker – vocals, synthesizer
- Nils Johansen – mandolin, flute, bass, synthesizer, programming
- Geir Jenssen – synthesizer, programming

Additional personnel

- Marc Hollander – woodwinds
- Gilles Martin – production
- Bernard Bocarra – artwork
