= Diskjokke =

- Origin: Svelvik, Norway
- Genres: Electronic music
- Label: Smalltown Supersound

Diskjokke (also spelled diskJokke) is the stage name of Joachim Dyrdahl, the Norwegian disc jockey and record producer.

== Early life ==
Dyrdahl was born in the town of Svelvik, southwest of Oslo, Norway.

At the age of five years, Dyrdahl started playing the violin, and at 14 he started spinning records at parties and clubs semi-professionally. He studied mathematics in a Trondheim university, and then he relocated to Oslo where he engaged himself seriously to music.

== Career ==
Diskjokke initially combined his classical and disc jockey backgrounds to work as a record producer. Prins Thomas released two of diskJokke's tracks as 12-inch singles on his Full Pupp record label.

Two more of Diskjokke's 12" singles were released by Get Physical records on the label's Kindish imprint. Subsequently, he became resident disc jockey at one of Norway's clubs. His music appeared on a Sunkissed compilation, resulting in subsequent offers to do remixes for other artists.

Smalltown Supersound, the label where artist Lindstrøm, reportedly one of Dyrdahl's main inspirations, released Diskjokke's first full-length album, Staying In, in late 2007. In 2007, Diskjokee appeared in the Insomnia music festival in Tromsø, Norway. In 2008, he took part in the Dour Festival in Dour, Belgium.

In the same year, Vice Records released an 11-minute Diskjokke remix of Bloc Party's "Sunday". In 2010, he released his second album En Fin Tid ("A Good Time"). In 2010, he mixed Apparatjik "Look Kids" in their EP 4 Can Keep A Secret If 3 Of Them Are Dead.

For his 2011 album Sagara, Diskjokke accepted a commission granted by Norway's Øye Festival and traveled to Indonesia to record with local Gamelan musicians.

The American TV series Bored to Death on HBO has featured his music. Diskjokke has appeared in the Hoxton Bar & Kitchen monthly live events, in London, UK, which are sponsored by Moshi Moshi Records.

== Discography ==
- Dislocated (remixes) 2009
- Staying In 2009, which contains the hit track "Flott Flyt" ("Beautiful Life")
- En Fin Tid ("A Good Time") 2010
- Sagara 2011
