= Dorothy's Victory =

2002 studio album by Bel Canto

Studio album by Bel Canto
- Released: 27 February 2002
- Genre: Dream pop; synth-pop; new-age
- Length: 50:32
- Label: EMI
- Producer: Anneli Drecker; Nils Johansen; Torbjørn Brundtland

Bel Canto chronology
Rush (1998)	Dorothy's Victory (2002)

Dorothy's Victory is the sixth studio album by Norwegian band Bel Canto, released on 27 February 2002 by EMI.

== Reception ==
Professional ratings
Review scores
Source	Rating
Dagbladet	3/6 stars
Verdens Gang	5/6 stars

Verdens Gang reviewer Kurt Bakkemoen awarded the album dice 5, and Dagbladet reviewer Håkon Molset awarded the album dice 3.

== Track listing ==
No.	Title	Length
1.	"Foolish Ship"	4:32
2.	"Feels Like I'm Already Flying"	3:59
3.	"You Rock My World Tonight"	4:42
4.	"Disappear Club 5"	4:34
5.	"Night Lady"	6:37
6.	"Dorothy's Victory"	4:22
7.	"Tree"	5:34
8.	"Happy Times Fly Fast!"	3:54
9.	"Im Best'n Beihs"	5:17
10.	"Corals, Jade and Pearls"	4:00
11.	"Ladonia"	5:15

== Personnel ==
=== Musicians ===
- Anneli Drecker – vocals, keyboards, piano
- Nils Johansen – guitar, stick bass, keyboards, bass, violin, programming
- Andreas Eriksen – percussion
- Richard Lowe – keyboards, programming
- Gaute Barlindhaug – keyboards, programming
- Thomas Tofte – bass (track 1)
- Peter Baden – drums (track 1)
- Henning Leh – additional guitar (track 1)
- Bjørn Fløystad, Espen Berg, Vidar Ersfjord – additional keyboards (track 1)
- Stefan Kvarnström – drums, piano, drum programming (track 3)
- Sindre Hotvedt – strings programming (track 2)
- Jonny Sjo – bass (track 3)
- Karl Oluf Wennerberg – drums (track 3)
- Espen Grjotheim – backing vocals (track 3)
- Torbjørn Brundtland – keyboards, piano, programming (tracks 1, 4)
- "Tale of Urashima Taro" recitation – Hiroshi Tamaoki

=== Technical ===
- Anneli Drecker, Nils Johansen, Torbjørn Brundtland – production
- Espen Berg – production, mixing (track 1)
- The Feverish Fumbling Fingers Team – co-production (track 3)
- Richard Lowe – co-production (track 10)
- Stefan Kvarnström – engineering
- Anneli Drecker, Richard Lowe, Michael Ilbert, Ulf Holand – mixing

== Charts ==
Chart performance for Dorothy's Victory
Chart (2002)	Peak position
Norwegian Albums (VG-lista)	2
