= Birds of Passage (album) =

Studio album by Bel Canto
- Released: 1989 (European Union); March 6, 1990 (United States) (second pressing)
- Genres: Dream pop, synth-pop, new age
- Labels: Crammed Discs (European Union); CRAM 065 I.R.S./MCA (United States) (first pressing); IRSD-82031 I.R.S./EMI (United States) (second pressing); 0220 7 13031 2 5 X2-13031 Nettwerk (Canada)

Bel Canto chronology
White-Out Conditions (1987)	Birds of Passage (1989)	Shimmering, Warm and Bright (1992)

Professional ratings
Review scores
Source	Rating
AllMusic	4.5/5 stars

Birds of Passage is the second album by the Norwegian band Bel Canto.

== Track listing ==
1. "Intravenous" (Drecker, Drecker, Jenssen) – 3:18
2. "Birds of Passage" (Jenssen, Johansen, Johansen) – 5:26
3. "The Glassmaker" (Drecker, Jenssen) – 4:27
4. "A Shoulder to the Wheel" (Drecker, Drecker, Johansen) – 4:16
5. "Time Without End" (Johansen, Johansen) – 5:01
6. "Oyster" (Drecker, Drecker) – 3:04
7. "Continuum" (Del Valle, Drecker, Jenssen) – 4:34
8. "Dewy Fields" (Drecker, Jenssen, Johansen) – 4:01
9. "The Suffering" (Drecker, Drecker, Jenssen ) – 4:05
10. "Picnic on the Moon" (Drecker, Drecker, Jenssen) – 4:39
11. "Look 3" (Drecker, Jenssen) – 4:32

== Personnel ==
- Bel Canto – Producer
- Stefan de Batselier – Photography
- Michel Delory – Guitar, drums
- Anneli Marian Drecker – Piano, keyboards, vocals
- Jeannot Gillis – Violin, viola, string arrangements
- Marc Hollander – Clarinet, percussion, keyboards, producer
- Geir Jenssen – Piano, keyboards, programming, photography, Roland TR-808
- Nils Johansen – Bass, bouzouki, guitar, mandolin, programming, vocals, script
- Giles Martin – Producer, engineer
- Claudine Steenackers – Cello
- Luc van Lieshout – Trumpet, flugelhorn
