= Your New Best Friends =

Studio album by Ralph Myerz and the Jack Herren Band
- Released: 27 September 2004 (Norway); 13 June 2005 (UK)
- Recorded: ?
- Genre: Electronica
- Length: 67:11
- Label: Emperor Norton Records
- Producer: Ralph Myerz and The Jack Herren Band

Ralph Myerz and the Jack Herren Band chronology
A Special Album (2003)	Your New Best Friends (2004)	Sharp Knives & Loaded Guns (2006)

Professional ratings
Review scores
Source	Rating
The Sunday Times	(3/5)

Your New Best Friends is the second album by Ralph Myerz and the Jack Herren Band. There is an untitled hidden track 15 minutes and 20 seconds into track 12.

== Track listing ==
1. "Kill The Habit"
2. "Natasha 75"
3. "L.i.p.s.t.i.c.k."
4. "Dubspace"
5. "My Private Night"
6. "Dr Lovemuscle"
7. "Vendetta"
8. "Waiting For You"
9. "She Was Here"
10. "Escape From The Island"
11. "Bergen"
12. "So Me" / untitled Hidden Track @ 15m20s
