= Xploding Plastix =

Norwegian electronic music duo

- Origin: Oslo, Norway
- Genres: Big beat, acid jazz, electronica, trip hop
- Years active: 2000–present
- Labels: Beatservice, Hospital
- Members: Jens Petter Nilsen; Hallvard Wennersberg Hagen
- Website: www.xplodingplastix.com

Xploding Plastix is a Norwegian electronic music duo, consisting of Jens Petter Nilsen and Hallvard Wennersberg Hagen.

== Biography ==
Jens Petter Nilsen and Hallvard Wennersberg Hagen (formerly of Norwegian black metal band Kvist) formed the group in early 1999, and submitted their first demo in 2000. Their song, "Treat Me Mean, I need the Reputation" became an instant classic when it was released as a 7" on Beatservice Records in 2000. It was later re-released in 2002 on Hospital Records and championed by LTJ Bukem, Coldcut, and Grooverider. Their first album, Amateur Girlfriends Go Proskirt Agents, was released in 2001 on Beatservice, and re-issued in 2004 by Palm Pictures.

Since the release of The Donca Matic Singalongs album in 2003, they have been busy working with music for short films, movies, and TV- and radio-productions. They have also collaborated with the Kronos Quartet who have performed their three movement composition, The Order on Things: Music for the Kronos Quartet. They have also worked in the collaboration project Piston Ltd who released the album Domestic Engine in 2007. They also have a side project, The Electones.

Xploding Plastix released a new album in September 2008 entitled Treated Timber Resists Rot on Beatservice Records. This was accompanied by a revisited re-release of The Donca Matic Singalongs which was not originally distributed outside of Scandinavia, and a new EP called Devious Dan featuring tracks from previous music videos.

== Honors ==
- 2003: Spellemannprisen in the category Elektronika, for the album The Benevolent Volume Lurkings

== Discography ==
Albums

- 2001: Amateur Girlfriends Go Proskirt Agents, CD/LP (Beatservice Records)
- 2003: The Donca Matic Singalongs, CD/LP (Columbia Records)
- 2004: Amateur Girlfriends, CD/LP (Palm Beats)
- 2008: Treated Timber Resists Rot, CD/LP (Beatservice Records)
- 2009: The Donca Matic Singalongs Revisited, CD/LP (Beatservice Records)
- 2023: This Is Accurate, CD/LP (Beatservice Records)

Singles and EPs

- 2000: Treat me mean, I need the reputation, 7" (Beatservice Records)
- 2001: Doubletalk, EP 12" (Beatservice Records)
- 2001: Behind the Eightball, EP (Beatservice Records)
- 2002: Plastic Surgery LP 3 Sampler side A, 12" (Hospital Records NHS42)
- 2003: The Benevolent Volume Lurkings, EP (Columbia Records)
- 2003: Geigerteller, Single (Sony Music Entertainment, Norway)
- 2004: The Rebop By Proxy EP, EP (Palm Beats)
- 2010: Devious Dan EP, EP (Beatservice Records)
- 2023: Frugality Inertia, Single (Beatservice Records)
- 2023: Average Agreeableness, Single (Beatservice Records)
- 2023: Optimal Meat To Bread Ratio, Single (Beatservice Records)
- 2023: More Espresso, Less Depresso, Single (Beatservice Records)
- 2024: I Would Prefer Not To, Single (Beatservice Records)
- 2026: Motion Lock, Single (Beatservice Records)

Awards
Preceded by Salvatore	Recipient of the Elektronika Spellemannprisen; 2003	Succeeded by Lars Horntveth
