= Bel Canto (band) =

Norwegian pop duo

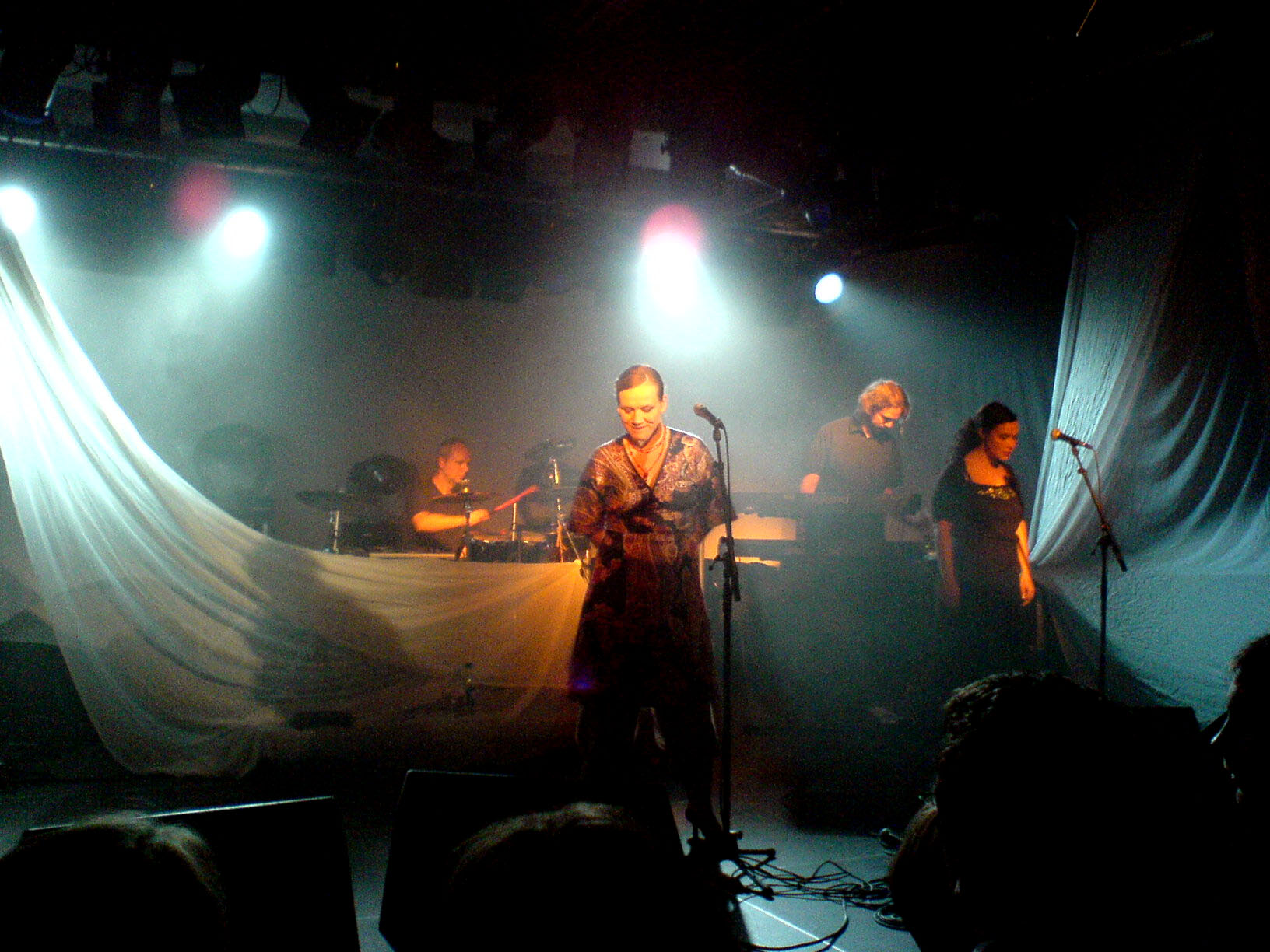

Background information
- Origin: Tromsø, Norway
- Genres: Dream pop, synthpop, new-age
- Years active: 1985–present
- Labels: Crammed Discs; Nettwerk Records; IRS/MCA Records; Columbia/SME Records (France); Dali/Chameleon/Elektra Records; Lava/Atlantic Records; EMI Records
- Members: Anneli Drecker; Nils Johansen
- Past members: Geir Jenssen

Bel Canto is a Norwegian music duo, originally a trio, fronted by vocalist Anneli Drecker, and signed originally to Crammed Discs.

== Biography ==
Bel Canto was formed in 1985 in Tromsø by Geir Jenssen (keyboards, synthesizer, programming), Nils Johansen (synthesizer, violin, bass guitar, guitar) and vocalist Anneli Drecker. Asked about early influences, Drecker mentioned OMD, David Bowie, 4AD-artists, Clannad, Kate Bush, Laurie Anderson, David Sylvian, YMO and Ryuichi Sakamoto, Depeche Mode, and the Blue Nile, among others.

Bel Canto was one of the first Norwegian bands to sign a record contract abroad. The trio moved to Brussels in 1986 and had their debut album White-Out Conditions released by Crammed Discs the following year. After a second album, Birds of Passage (1990), Jenssen left the band for a solo career as Biosphere. The group had a commercial breakthrough with Shimmering, Warm and Bright in 1992, and won the Spellemannprisen award twice, in 1992 and 1996. Their style evolved over time from an ethereal dream pop sound to synth-based pop influenced by world music, also including influences from classical music, traditional nordic folk music and trip hop.

During their career, Bel Canto had periods of reduced activity while its members pursued other projects. Alongside her work with the band, Anneli Drecker pursued a solo career, performed with other bands and artists such as Röyksopp, and appeared in films and theatre productions. Nils Johansen composed music for film and television and worked with his other band, Vajas.

In 2007 it was reported that the original three-piece line-up of Bel Canto had reunited and was working on a new album. But the project was not completed and founder member Geir Jenssen left the band again.

In 2009, a previously unheard Bel Canto song, "Flowerbeds", which dates from 1988, appeared on a Norwegian compilation album called Maskindans: Norsk synth 1980–1988 released on Hommage Records.

In 2017 Bel Canto performed at Øyafestivalen in Oslo, playing some of their careers best known songs in a near hour long set. In an interview Anneli Drecker said that the band was keen to do more live work and possibly record new songs.

In June 2022, Anneli Drecker and Nils Johansen announced that they were working on a new Bel Canto album. The album was released on 26 April 2024 with the title Radiant Green, the duo's first album in 22 years.

== Discography ==
=== Albums ===
- White-Out Conditions (1987)
- Birds of Passage (1989)
- Shimmering, Warm and Bright (1992)
- Magic Box (1996)
- Rush (French release titled Images) (1998)
- Dorothy's Victory (2002)
- Retrospect - compilation album (2001)
- Radiant Green (2024)

=== Singles ===
Year	Single	Peak chart positions		Album
Year	Single	NOR	US Dance	Album
1988	"Blank Sheets"	—	—	White-Out Conditions
1988	"White-Out Conditions"	—	—	White-Out Conditions
1989	"Dreaming Girl" (CAN only)	—	—	White-Out Conditions
1990	"Oskoreï" (FRA only)	—	—	single only
1990	"Birds Of Passage"	—	—	Birds Of Passage
1991	"A Shoulder To The Wheel"	—	—	Birds Of Passage
1992	"Shimmering, Warm & Bright"	—	—	Shimmering, Warm & Bright
1992	"Unicorn"	—	—	Shimmering, Warm & Bright
1996	"Rumour"	19	8	Magic Box
1998	"Images" (FRA only)	—	—	Rush
2002	"Feels Like I'm Already Flying" (NOR only)	—	—	Dorothy's Victory
"—" denotes releases that did not chart or were not released.

=== Drecker's solo albums ===
- Tundra (2000)
- Frolic (2005)
- Rocks and Straws (2015)
- Revelation For Personal Use (2017)

Awards
Preceded by Tre Små Kinesere	Recipient of the Pop Spellemannprisen; 1992	Succeeded by Pogo Pops
Preceded by deLillos	Recipient of the Pop Band Spellemannprisen; 1996	Succeeded by Velvet Belly
