= Mental Overdrive =

Norwegian musician

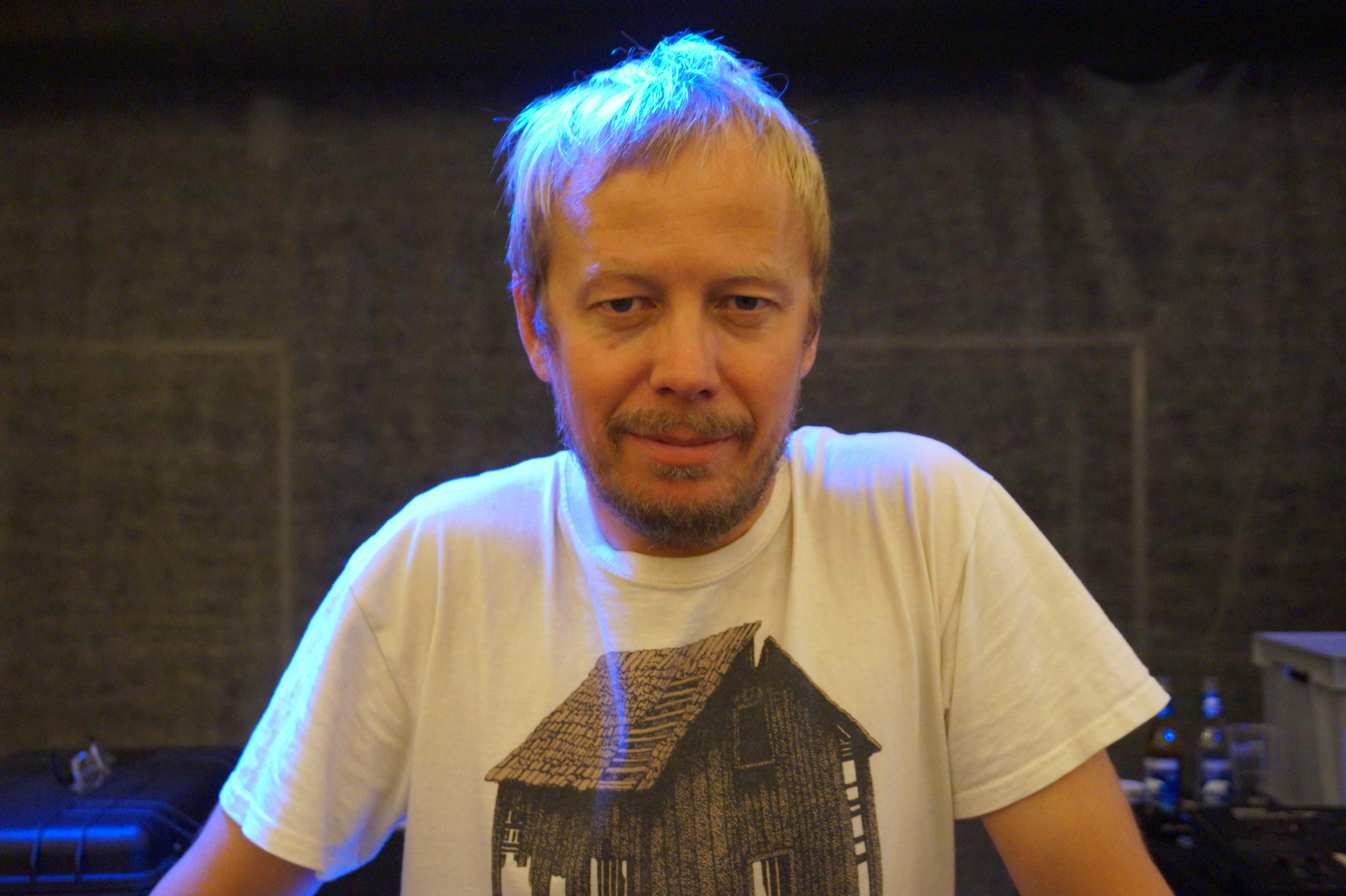

Background information
- Birth name: Per Martinsen
- Born: July 31, 1966 (age 59); Tromsø, Norway
- Genres: Electronic
- Occupation: Music artist
- Labels: R&S Records, Smalltown Supersound, Ploink, Love OD Communications, Music Man, Virgin Records, Discfunction, Airtight, Full Pupp, Rett i Fletta

Mental Overdrive is the primary solo moniker of Per Martinsen (born 31 July 1966), one of Norway's most prolific and influential techno musicians. His tracks have ranged from hardcore rave techno to vibrant space-disco, and he's always maintained a healthy balance of humor and braininess.

== Career ==
Active since 1990, he began his career releasing several 12" EPs of aggressive, rave-ready hardcore techno on revered Belgian label R&S, including 12000 AD (1990), The Second Coming (1991), Move! (as Confusion Club, 1991), and The Love EP (1992). In 1994, Martinsen began releasing atmospheric techno singles as part of Illumination, his duo with Nicholas Sillitoe. The next year, Mental Overdrive released the single "Disto Disco," which featured a B-side ("Faith") co-written by R&S artist Outlander, best known for the 1991 classic "Vamp." The A-side appeared on Mental Overdrive's full-length debut Plugged, released on Martinsen's own Love OD Communications. The album showed a notable progression in his music, maintaining its rough, distorted hardcore techno sound while adding more cerebral elements, placing it closer to Warp's Artificial Intelligence series. Martinsen displayed his sense of humor with 1996's Unplugged, a limited conceptual release containing silent "versions" of the tracks on Plugged. In 1997, Mental Overdrive signed to Virgin and released About Jazz, a significantly more house/disco-influenced EP than his previous work. This was followed by full-length Ad Absurdum, which continued in a more light-hearted and funky direction than his previous releases. He took a few years off from releasing Mental Overdrive recordings, instead devoting time to Frost (his more pop-focused electronic duo with his wife Aggie Peterson) and Illumination, which released two albums on RCA. Following the 2003 release of Mental Overdrive's Me EP on Love OD, he signed to Norwegian label Smalltown Supersound and released full-length 083, which featured the single "Diskodans." In 2005, the label compiled his early R&S material on CD as The Phuture That Never Happened. Two years later, Mental Overdrive's single "Spooks" appeared on Prins Thomas' Full Pupp label. The song appeared on his next Smalltown full-length, You Are Being Manipulated, which was released in 2008. The album was perfectly at home with the label's other left-field dance artists like Bjørn Torske and Kim Hiorthøy, while maintaining the unique Mental Overdrive sound. Martinsen continued releasing Mental Overdrive singles on Full Pupp and Love OD, and contributed to Rune Lindbæk's Meanderthals project. In 2012, he released Man with a Movie Camera, an EP featuring music he'd composed for a 1996 screening of the Russian silent film of the same name, which also featured pieces by Biosphere which would later appear on the 2001 remaster of his classic album Substrata. Mental Overdrive returned to his Love OD label for 2013 full-length Cycls, as well as 2014's Everything Is Connected, which compiled a few previously released EPs. In 2016, Full Pupp sublabel Rett I Fletta released a new version of Plugged consisting of alternate takes sourced from the original DAT tapes. (Paul Simpson for allmusic.com)

His influence upon the Nordic music scene has been summarized by one collaborator as follows:

Here was a man who could claim, pokerfaced, to be the Godfather of Norwegian Techno, the Grand Uncle of Twisted Disco, the Second Cousin of Black Metal Darkcore, Sibling of Scandinavian progressive rock ('72-'75), Nephew of Nordic Folk and Husband of Scando Pop. New Wave was his teenage Mistress and Norwegian Cosmic Disco was his illegitimate Son. By means of various acts of wilful dissemination he donated audiosperm to the cloning projects that produced Bjørn Torske, Röyksopp, Lindstrom and Prins Thomas. Diskjokke was the result of a quickie with the maid at the House that he built with his bare hands. Yes. All this he could say if he so desired. And say it with a pokerface that Lady Gaga would find completely inscrutable. And now, as he walks down the Boulevard of Broken Beats he continues to spread his genes: Norsebeat; Snowcore; Drum & Ice; Jambient Prog; Tree-step; Fishco ... all are his Children.

== Discography ==
=== Mental Overdrive ===
- Plugged (Love OD Communications, 1995)
- Unplugged (Love OD Communications, 1996)
- Ad Absurdum (Virgin, 1999)
- 083 (Smalltown Supersound, 2004)
- The Phuture That Never Happened (Smalltown Supersound, 2005)
- You Are Being Manipulated (Smalltown Supersound, 2008)
- Cycls (Love OD Communications, 2013)
- Everything is connected (Love OD Communications, 2014)
- Hardware (Ploink, 2017)

Awards
Preceded by Ralph Myerz and the Jack Herren Band	Recipient of the Elektronika/Dance Spellemannprisen; 2014	Succeeded by -
