= Alanïa =

Norwegian musical group

- Origin: Tromsø, Norway
- Genres: Electronic; Ambient
- Years active: 1996–1997
- Labels: Drum Island Records; EMI; Parlophone
- Spinoffs: Röyksopp
- Past members: Torbjørn Brundtland; Svein Berge; Rune Lindbæk; Gaute Barlindhaug

Alanïa is a former Norwegian electronic music group from Tromsø, composed of Torbjørn Brundtland and Svein Berge of Röyksopp, Rune Lindbæk and Gaute Barlindhaug.

== History ==
Lindbæk and Brundtland were officially the main members of the group, but Berge and Barlindhaug were notable contributors. Almost all music was made by Brundtland, Berge and Barlindhaug. They have released the albums Instinctive Travels (1996) on Parlophone and Skyjuice (1997) on Drum Island Records. The group dissolved in 1997, and Berge and Brundtland started Röyksopp in 1998.

Critics have said that the music has a "unique, polar mood" and that the skill level of the productions "makes it very nice to be Norwegian, and make you wish that Tromsø was your hometown".

== Discography ==
- Instinctive Travels (1996)
- Skyjuice (1997)

== See also ==
- Röyksopp
- Svein Berge
- Torbjørn Brundtland
- Drum Island
- Aedena Cycle
- Gaute Barlindhaug
