= The Benevolent Volume Lurkings =

EP by Xploding Plastix
- Released: March 31, 2003
- Genre: Electronica, Big beat
- Length: 20:05
- Label: Columbia

Xploding Plastix chronology
| Plastic Surgery LP 3 Sampler (2002) | The Benevolent Volume Lurkings (2003) | The Donca Matic Singalongs (2003) |

The Benevolent Volume Lurkings is an EP by Norwegian big beat duo Xploding Plastix, released on Columbia Records in 2003. It features a remix by Joseph Nothing.

== Track listing ==
1. "Shakedown Shutoff" - 3:47
2. "The Famous Biting Guy" - 3:45
3. "Skinny Love Spasm" - 3:41
4. "Joy Comes In The Morning" - 4:43
5. "The Famous Biting Guy (Joseph Nothing Remix)" - 4:10
