= Aedena Cycle =

Norwegian electronic music group

- Origin: Tromsø, Norway
- Genres: Electronic; Ambient
- Years active: 1994–1999
- Labels: Apollo; Beatservice Records
- Past members: Torbjørn Brundtland; Svein Berge; Gaute Barlindhaug; Kolbjørn Lyslo

Aedena Cycle is a former Norwegian electronic music group from Tromsø, composed of Torbjørn Brundtland and Svein Berge (from Röyksopp), Kolbjørn Lyslo and Gaute Barlindhaug. The quartet released an EP called "The Travellers' Dream EP" on R&S/Apollo in 1994. This was the first official release involving Berge and Brundtland, who later formed the world-renowned group Röyksopp.

After this, Aedena Cycle was a solo project, with only Barlindhaug left from the original line up. Barlindhaug released two albums on Beatservice Records as Aedena Cycle. The album "Albite" came out in 1997 and "Cargo Cult" was released in 1999.

In 2001 Barlindhaug had to change the artist name from Aedena Cycle to Kolar Goi because the creator of the American graphic novel The Aedena Cycle had the copyright to the name.

Kolbjørn Lyslo now figures under the artist name Doc L. Jnr.

== See also ==
- Röyksopp
- Svein Berge
- Torbjørn Brundtland
- Alanïa
- Drum Island
- Beatservice Records
