= Byen (album) =

Studio album by Bjørn Torske
- Released: July 6, 2018
- Length: 59:45
- Label: Smalltown Supersound

Bjørn Torske chronology
Kokning (2011)	Byen (2018)

Professional ratings
Aggregate scores
Source	Rating
Metacritic	71/100
Review scores
Source	Rating
AllMusic	3.5/5 stars
Exclaim!	7/10
Pitchfork	7/10

Byen is the fifth studio album by Norwegian musician Bjørn Torske. It was released in July 2018 under Smalltown Supersound.

== Track listing ==
No.	Title	Length
1.	"First Movement"	8:07
2.	"Clean Air"	7:56
3.	"Fanfatas"	7:44
4.	"Dalen"	5:23
5.	"Chord Control"	8:25
6.	"Gata"	8:10
7.	"Night Call"	11:05
8.	"Natta"	2:55
