= Beatservice Records =

Norwegian record label

Beatservice Records (established 10 October 1994 in Tromsø, Norway) is a Norwegian record label releasing electronic music. It was initiated by Vidar Hanssen who was DJing for a local student radio with the program The Beatservice Radio Show at the time. Beatservice Records have released music ranging from minimalistic ambient via house and experimental techno to drum and bass. The label was an important factor in the mid-to-late 1990s popularity of the Tromsø based electronic music scene, both in Norway and elsewhere.

It has released music by artists such as Biosphere, Elektrofant, Aedena Cycle, Kolar Goi, Flunk, Ralph Myerz, Xploding Plastix, Teebee, Sternklang, Kim Hiorthøy, Howard Maple, Bjørn Torske and Frost.

Hanssen is also involved in the Insomnia Festival.

== See also ==
- List of record labels
