= Flunk =

Norwegian electronic band

- Origin: Oslo, Norway
- Genres: Trip hop; indietronica; folktronica
- Years active: 2000–present
- Labels: Beatservice
- Members: Ulf Nygaard; Jo Bakke; Anja Øyen Vister; Ole Kristian Wetten
- Past members: Erik Ruud
- Website: flunkmusic.com

Flunk is a Norwegian electronic band consisting of producer Ulf Nygaard, guitarist Jo Bakke, vocalist Anja Øyen Vister, and bassist Ole Kristian Wetten. Drummer Erik Ruud played with the band between 2012 and 2020.

== Career ==
Flunk began as a project between Ulf Nygaard and Jo Bakke in Oslo, Norway, in late 2000 and early 2001. Beginning as an instrumental and sampled-vocal project, they were signed for a track on a compilation by Beatservice Records in the winter of 2001. On hearing the finished track, label manager Vidar Hanssen signed the still-unnamed band for a full album.

During the summer of 2001, the duo recorded most of the album and Vister improvised the vocals. Afterward, Bakke layered the guitars, but it would be a year before the album was completed and released.

In the spring of 2002, the band chose the name Flunk, and they released their first single, a cover of New Order's "Blue Monday", in April. The track was well received in the UK and was included on numerous compilations in North America and Europe. Later in April, their debut album, For Sleepyheads Only, was released, garnering positive reviews in Norway. With the success of this record, the BBC invited the group to do a recording session for the Radio 1 show The Blue Room in London. Shortly after, the Notting Hill Arts Club would become the location of their live debut. In the United States, Flunk signed with Guidance Recordings.

By the summer of 2002, the band was getting rave reviews from British electronica magazines. In October, For Sleepyheads Only was released in the US. In November, Flunk played the London Jazz Festival.

In June 2003, Beatservice Records released Treat Me Like You Do - For Sleepyheads Only Remixed. The band soon began work on their second album, recording in Paris in October.

Flunk's sophomore studio effort, Morning Star, was finished in March 2004 and saw a Norwegian release in May and the rest of the world in June. In 2005, the EP Play America was released on Beatservice Records and included bonus tracks from the US version of Morning Star, along with remixes.

In 2007, Flunk released their third album, Personal Stereo, while May 2009 saw the publication of This Is What You Get, which includes a cover version of Radiohead's "Karma Police".

In 2013, the band released their fifth studio album, Lost Causes. Cover Ups – The Home Recordings, a covers album, came out in 2016, followed by Chemistry and Math in 2017. The band's latest record, History of Everything Ever, hit the shelves in 2021.

== Appearances ==
In January 2005, Flunk's track "Play", from Morning Star, appeared in an episode of The O.C. titled "The Risky Business" and later on Music from the OC: Mix 4. In April 2008, the track appeared in episode 5 of the PBS series Carrier.

The song "Spring to Kingdom Come", from Morning Star, was featured in episode 20, season 2 of the television series Numb3rs.

"See Thru You", from For Sleepyheads Only, was featured in the fourth episode of the television series Big Love, "Eclipse".

"Blue Monday" can be heard in the 2004 movie Walking Tall as well as 2007's Nancy Drew.

"Honey's in Love" is heard briefly in an episode of The L Word in 2005.

"Only You" appears in an episode of the second season of the series Designated Survivor.

== Discography ==
=== Studio albums ===
- For Sleepyheads Only (2002)
- Morning Star (2004)
- Personal Stereo (2007)
- This Is What You Get (2009)
- Lost Causes (2013)
- Cover Ups – The Home Recordings (2016)
- Chemistry and Math (2017)
- History of Everything Ever (2021)
- Cover Ups, Vol. 2 (2023)
- Take Me Places (2025)

=== EPs ===
- Miss World (2002)
- The Blue Monday Remixes (2002)
- Blue Monday (2002)
- Play America (2005)
- All Day and All of the Night Remixes (2005)
- History Dubs (2021)
- Xmas EP (2025)

=== Remix albums ===
- Treat Me Like You Do – For Sleepyheads Only Remixed (2003)
- Democracy: Personal Stereo Versions (2007)
- Deconstruction Time Again (2015)
- Skl Rmx (2018)

=== Live albums ===
- KEXP Live Sessions (2006)
- Blue Monday Live in Prague (2014)

=== Compilations ===
- The Songs We Sing – Best of 2002–2012 (2012)

=== Singles ===
- "Miss World" (2002)
- "Blue Monday" (2002)
- "On My Balcony" (2004)
- "All Day and All of the Night" (2005)
- "Sit Down" (2007)
- "Personal Stereo" (2007) – with Alceen
- "Silent Night" (2008)
- "Common Sense" (2009)
- "Queen of the Underground" (2012)
- "Cigarette Burns" (2012)
- "Sanctuary" (2013)
- "Love and Halogen" (2013)
- "TMTTUOT" (2016)
- "Petrified" (2017)
- "Outsiders" (2017)
- "Chemistry and Math" (2017)
- "Your Beautiful Lies" (2018)
- "Indian Rope Trick" (2018)
- "Have Yourself a Merry Little Christmas" (2018)
- "Ashes to Ashes" (2021)
- "Under the Covers" (2021)
- "I Get You" (2021)
- "Fingertips" (2021)
- "Midsummer" (2021)
- "Down Here / Moon Above" (2021)
- "Golden Brown" (2023)
- "Cherry Came Too" (2023)
- "Sub Zero Sundays" (2024)
- "I Think I Like You" (2024)
- "Noise" (2024)
- "Paradise Circus" (2024)
- "Climbing Kilimanjaro" (2024)
- "Omens" (2025)
- "Trapdoor" (2025)
- "Sleeping on the Phone Side" (2025)
- "Acid House" (2025)
