= Ralph Myerz and the Jack Herren Band =

Norwegian electronica/hip-hop group

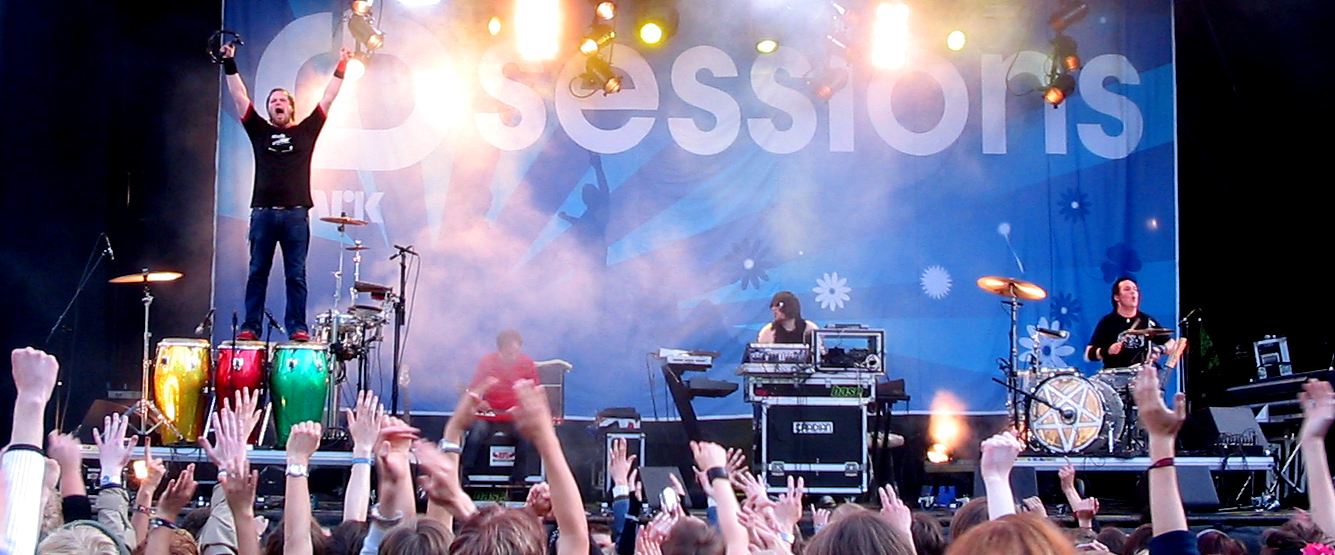
- The band performing at P3sessions in Oslo, 27 May 2006. Thomas Lønnheim standing on his drums.

Background information
- Origin: Bergen, Norway
- Genres: Electronica, hip hop, indie rock
- Years active: 1997–present
- Labels: Tellé (Norway) (1999); Emperor Norton (2002); EMI/Virgin (2006); Beatservice (Norway) (2008); Sony Music/Columbia (2009-present); Klik (Greece) (2010); Disco Piñata (2011-present)
- Members: Erlend Sellevold; Tarjei Strøm
- Past members: Thomas Lønnheim

Ralph Myerz and the Jack Herren Band is a Norwegian electronica/hip-hop group/producer.

== Career ==
The band was formed in 1997. They released a 7" and a 12" on Telle Records.

In 2002, they were signed by the U.S. label Emperor Norton Records and released A Special EP, followed by the full-length A Special Album was released May 20, 2003, and received a positive review in CMJ. CMJ did a promotion with the band as well, and commented on their influences: "influenced by old-school porn soundtracks and Russ Meyer flicks--what could be better?"

The third album, Sharp Knives & Loaded Guns came out on EMI in 2007, and was followed by European tours. In 2008, the song "The Teacher" was included on the Grand Theft Auto IV in-game radio soundtrack; it is a remix of the hit song "Forelska i Lærer'n" by the Norwegian rock band The Kids. They released a new single, "The Queen of the Night", in October 2008. In late 2008, percussionist Thomas Lønnheim departed the band. Soon after this album and especially this tour, Ralph Myerz decided to focus more on production and studio work.

On January 18, 2014, Ralph Myerz won Best Electronic/Dance Album at the 2013 Spellemannprisen Awards, often noted as the Norwegian Grammy Awards, for his album "Supersonic Pulse", the album featured Snoop Dogg, George Clinton, Roxanne Shante, Nipsey Hussle, Da YoungFellaz, David Banner, J. Wells, Annie, Diana Ross and the Supremes and more.

== Discography ==
=== Studio albums ===
- A Special Album (2003)
- Your New Best Friends (2005)
- Sharp Knives & Loaded Guns (2006)
- Ralphorama! (Appetite 4 Selfdestruction) (2008)
- Outrun (Muzik4lateniteridez) (2011)
- Supersonic Pulse (2013)

=== Extended plays ===
- A Special EP (2002)
- Your New Best Remix EP (2005)
- Sky Is The Limit EP (2006)
- My Darling EP (2007)
- Grey Goose (feat. Talib Kweli & Strong Arm Steady) - EP (2009)
- Take A Look At The World (feat. Annie) [Remixes] (2013)
- Stay Kosmik - (Ralph Myerz & The Kosmik Diamondz) (2014)
- Recognise - (Ralph Myerz Presents: REC) (2015)

=== Remixes ===
- Felix da Housecat featuring Miss Kittin - ("Madame Hollywood") (2002)

Awards
Preceded by Lindstrøm	Recipient of the Elektronika/Dance Spellemannprisen; 2013	Succeeded by Mental Overdrive
