= Frost (Norwegian band) =

Norwegian electronic duo

- Origin: Tromsø, Norway
- Genres: Electronic, electropop, trip hop
- Years active: 1997–present
- Labels: FrostWorld Recordings
- Members: Aggie Peterson; Per Martinsen
- Past members: Rune Lindbæk
- Website: frostnorway.com

Frost is a Norwegian electronic duo consisting of Aggie Peterson and Per Martinsen. The group formed in 1997 in Tromsø, Norway with original line-up composed of Aggie Peterson and DJ Rune Lindbæk. They released their debut album Bedsit Theories in 1998.

== History ==
Frost started as a project of Aggie Peterson and DJ Rune Lindbæk. They released their debut album Bedsit Theories in 1998. The album was produced with the assistance of Torbjørn Brundtland (of the duo Röyksopp) among other people. The album did well in Norway and the single "Clouds Across the Moon" (a cover of the Rah Band song) was featured on MTV in the summer of 1998.

The single "Endless Love" was released in 1999. The release contained remixes by Röyksopp and the duo Illumination/Chilluminati of which Per Martinsen was part. At this point, Peterson and Martinsen started working together and Lindbæk departed from the band. The new line-up started working on new music. Frost released 500 copies of the limited edition 7-inch single "Pharmacy"/"Half-Whole", which sold quickly and is now a rare item, and "Amygdala", a 12-inch double vinyl released with remixes by Atom(TM), Qwerty, Mind Over Midi and Martinsen's techno alias Mental Overdrive. This led to release of the second album Melodica in 2001. It was produced with help from Röyksopp and Norwegian trumpeter Nils Petter Molvær.

Frost released their third album Love! Revolution! on 26 March 2007. It was the second album created by Peterson and Martinsen. It was described by the duo as "upbeat space-pop". The tracks "Sleepwalker" and "One Hundred Years" have been released as singles on their own label FrostWorld Recordings to promote the album.

Martinsen and Peterson have mentioned Kraftwerk, Joy Division, OMD and Cocteau Twins among their favourite music.

== Relocation ==
After relocating to their hometown Tromsø, the duo was inspired by the Arctic and mysterious radio-signals, emitted from even further North. Martinsen and Peterson received an envelope covered with Russian stamps, inside was an old C60 cassette tape labeled Радио Магнитное ("Radio Magnetic" in Russian), and a letter from the analogue-loving radio enthusiast, stating that he had seen Frost perform their soundtrack to the Russian silent movie "Mother" in Arkhangelsk some years earlier, and that he thought this recording might be of interest. The couple immediately unpacked their old cassette tape deck, put the tape on, and discovered the beautiful music it contained – the music of a ghost radio filtered through static and time, like faint echoes from a recently lost civilization. The whole phenomenon was the most haunting experience, and this tape has been the main inspiration during the writing and recording of the new album – resulting in classic, dreamy pop songs crafted in 2012-style eclectic, electronic production.

The third album entitled Radiomagnetic was released internationally on 17 September 2012, and later in Norway, in August 2013. The album received favourable reviews, especially in the UK and US, but remained relatively unknown in their home country Norway.

The story of the radio signals led them to the former Russian settlement of Pyramiden in Spitsbergen, and they did a one-off concert in the deserted ghost-town, in the middle of arctic-nowhere. The Frost Event Pyramiden was covered by UK journalists from Dazed & Confused and VICE Noisey. The event was attended by about 150 people, and the city was, for a day, awoken and brought back to life, with Frosts music and visuals.

Since returning to Tromsø, Frost has been collaborating visually with Czech visual artist Petra Hermanová for their live concerts, and with film director Carl Christian Lein Størmer creating dark music videos. "The Woods" and "Something New" (filmed in Pyramiden) from Radiomagnetic 2012, are a result of their work together.

The collaboration has also resulted in the short film Ghost Radio Hunter, shown on Norwegian and international film festivals – a story based on the very same mysterious cassette tape, the Frost duo received in the mail, and Per's hunt for the signals' origin.

== Discography ==
=== Studio albums ===
- Bedsit Theories (1998) #19 NOR
- Melodica (2002) #28 NOR
- Love! Revolution! (2007)
- Radiomagnetic (2012)

=== Singles ===
- "Close to You" (1998) #7 NOR
- "Clouds Across the Moon" (1998) #13 NOR
- "Hope You'll Be There" (1998)
- "Endless Love" (1999)
- "Pharmacy" (2001)
- "Amygdala" (2002)
- "Sleepwalker" (2006)
- "One Hundred Years" (2007)
- "My Plastic Heart" (2008)
- "The Magician" (2011)
- "Parade" (2011)
- "The Woods" (2011)
- "Something New" (2012)
