= Bjørn Torske =

Norwegian house music producer

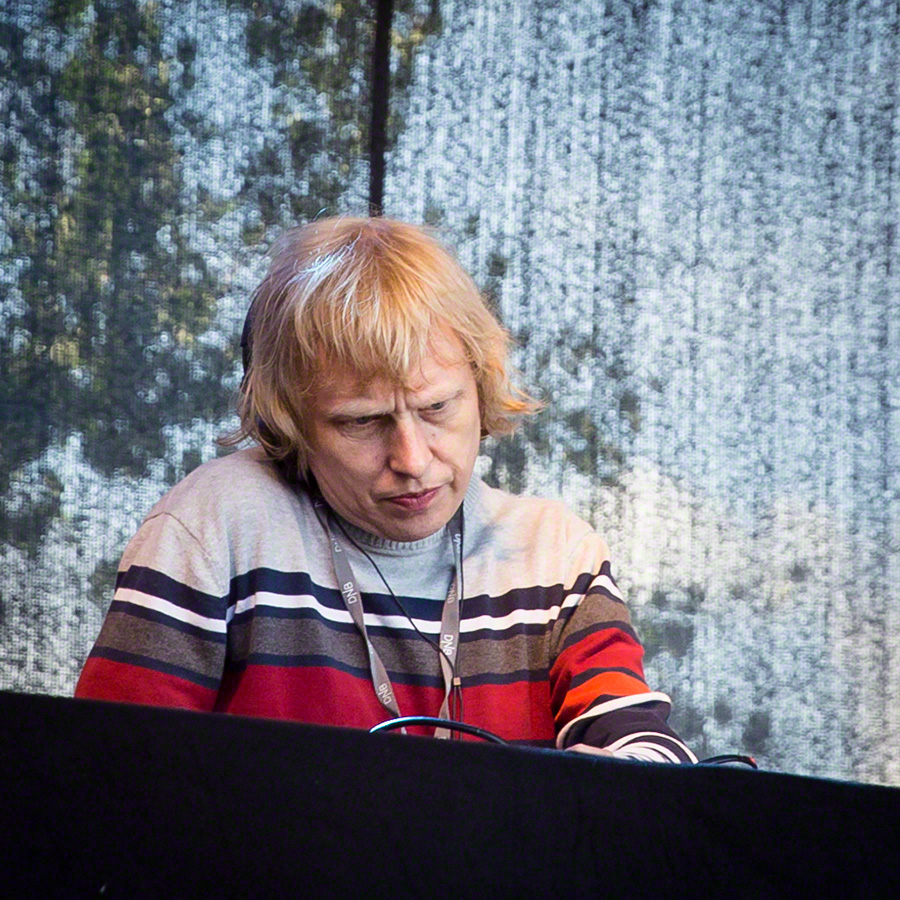
- Torske in 2016 at Q25 Jubileumsfesten

Background information
- Born: 1971 (age 54–55); Tromsø, Norway
- Genres: House music
- Occupation: Music producer
- Instruments: Synthesizer; keyboards
- Labels: Ferox Records; Svek; Tellé; Sex Tags Mania

Bjørn Torske (born 1971 in Tromsø, Norway) is a house music producer. He became involved with producing music and local radio before moving to Bergen, Norway. He has collaborated on many occasions with Röyksopp.

== Discography ==
=== EPs ===
- Expresso - 1998 - Ferox Records
- Aerosoles - 2000 - Svek
- Disco Members - 2000 - Tellé
- Hard Trafikk - 2001 - Tellé
- As'besto - 2006 - Sex Tags Mania (feat. Crystal Bois)
- Ny Lugg (Kort Bak / Lang På Siden) - March 6, 2006 - Smalltown Supersound
- Kokt Kveite - 2007 - Smalltown Supersound
- Kan Jeg Slippe? - May 28, 2008 - Sex Tags Mania

=== Albums ===
- Nedi Myra - 1998 - Ferox Records
- Trøbbel - 2001 - Tellé
- Feil Knapp - March 26, 2007 - Smalltown Supersound
- Kokning - November 2, 2010 - Smalltown Supersound
- Byen - July 6, 2018 - Smalltown Supersound
