= Wireless: Live at the Arnolfini, Bristol =

Live album by Biosphere
- Released: 2009
- Recorded: 27 October 2007
- Genre: Ambient
- Label: Touch
- Producer: Biosphere

Biosphere chronology
Cho Oyu 8201m – Field Recordings from Tibet (2006)	Wireless: Live at the Arnolfini, Bristol (2009)	N-Plants (2011)

Wireless: Live at the Arnolfini, Bristol is an ambient live album by Biosphere. It was recorded on 27 October 2007 at Bristol, United Kingdom. Biosphere performed tracks from some of his previous albums (Substrata, Cirque, Shenzhou and Dropsonde) and also three new pieces ("Pneuma", "Calais Ferryport" and "Pneuma II").

== Track listing ==
1. "Pneuma" – 2:13
2. "Shenzhou" – 6:22
3. "Birds Fly By Flapping Their Wings" – 6:45
4. "Kobresia" – 6:37
5. "When I Leave" – 6:20
6. "Warmed By the Drift" – 7:23
7. "The Things I Tell You" – 9:39
8. "Moistened and Dried" – 3:07
9. "Sherbrooke" – 6:11
10. "Calais Ferryport" – 5:39
11. "Pneuma II" – 1:56

== Credits ==
- All tracks written and performed by Geir Jenssen
- Mixed and mastered – BJNilsen
- Photography – Jon Wozencroft
- Additional Field Recordings – Jony Easterby
- Recorded – Chris Watson
