= Ambient techno =

Subgenre of techno music

- Stylistic origins: Techno; ambient house; ambient; new age; chillout; dub; acid house; electro
- Cultural origins: Late 1980s — early 1990s, UK and US

Other topics
- Intelligent dance music; dub techno

Ambient techno is a subgenre of techno that incorporates the atmospheric textures of ambient music with the rhythmic elements and production of techno. It was pioneered by 1990s electronic artists such as Aphex Twin, Carl Craig, The Orb, The Future Sound of London, the Black Dog, Pete Namlook and Biosphere.

== Characteristics and influences ==
AllMusic states that ambient techno, building off the ambient house scene, blended the "soaring, layered, aquatic atmospheres of beatless and experimental ambient" with techno's "well-produced, thin-sounding electronics." Artists fused the "environmentalist" work of Brian Eno, Jon Hassell, and Wendy Carlos with the rhythms of urban dance styles such as techno and acid house. Ambient techno artists returned to the instruments of the Detroit techno and Chicago house scenes, including analogue synthesizers, the Roland TB-303 bass machine, and the TR-909 drum machine. Common elements included heavily reverbed string pads and subtle drum programming that moved beyond the simple patterns of 4/4 techno and house, while artists typically de-emphasized sampling.

One principal influence on the genre was the 1984 album E2-E4 by German musician Manuel Göttsching. The Orb's 1991 album Adventures Beyond the Ultraworld would inspire dub-influenced ambient techno. Artforum noted the genre's similarities with new age: "swaddling the listener in a womblike sound bath, it means retreat from the environment, relief from the stresses of urban existence." Critic Simon Reynolds characterized the style as a "post-rave genre" meant "for immobile contemplation," comparing it to "the aqua-mysticism and forest idylls of Claude Debussy."

The style would be associated with labels such as Warp, Apollo, GPR, and Beyond, with releases focusing more on albums than 12-inch singles.

== History ==
=== Origins ===
Ambient techno departed from the communal, dance-oriented sound heard at raves and instead gained popularity in the early 1990s as a form of "electronic listening music." Artists such as Carl Craig, the Black Dog, and The Orb produced early works in the style. Carl Craig's early releases as part of the Detroit techno scene (later collected on the compilation Elements 1989-1990) showcased an ambient style of "narcoleptic, interior techno," and would inspire UK artists aiming to make atmospheric listening music. Aphex Twin's 1991 recording "Analogue Bubblebath" would also signal a shift toward meditative, ambient-leaning techno, while his 1992 debut LP Selected Ambient Works 85–92 became "the flagship of the emergent genre" according to SPIN. Producer Pete Namlook released a prodigious amount of music in the genre, starting the label Fax in 1992 and becoming a "spiritual leader" of the movement.

Other prominent artists in the style included Irresistible Force, Global Communication, Higher Intelligence Agency, and Future Sound of London. According to AllMusic, early classics of the era included Aphex Twin's debut LP, Ultramarine's Every Man and Woman Is a Star (1991), Biosphere's Microgravity (1991), and the Orb's U.F.Orb (1992). Author Sean Albiez added Higher Intelligence Agency's Colourform (1992) and the Black Dog's Temple of Transparent Balls (1993) as early examples. The release of Warp's Artificial Intelligence compilation in 1992 helped to establish the genre and featured ambient techno pioneers such Aphex Twin, B12, Autechre, the Black Dog, Richie Hawtin, and the Orb's Alex Paterson. B12's 1993 Warp album Electro-Soma was also called a classic of ambient techno by Resident Advisor. The Quietus characterized Luke Slater's early-90s work under his 7th Plain moniker as important to the style's development. Following the release of Warp's Artificial Intelligence series, the genre developed further into the "intelligent techno" scene.

=== Developments ===
During the 1990s, compilation series such as Chill Out or Die popularized ambient techno and house. In reaction against the more "cozy" features of the early ambient techno scene, some artists would move toward a dark ambient sound heard on releases such as Aphex Twin's Selected Ambient Works Volume II (1994) and projects by other "ambient noir-ists" such as Seefeel and the duo of David Toop & Max Eastley. Virgin's 1994 compilation Isolationism served as a summary of this darker tendency.

In the early-to mid-1990s, a small network of ambient techno artists developed around the Berlin-based labels Basic Channel and Chain Reaction. In 1995, producer Wolfgang Voigt began releasing influential ambient techno projects as Gas, bringing together lush and expansive atmospheres with 4/4 minimal techno beats. Voigt co-runs the German label Kompakt, which has released installments of the influential ambient techno compilation series Pop Ambient annually since 2001.

== See also ==
- Electronica
- Intelligent dance music
- Techno
