= Man with a Movie Camera (disambiguation) =

Man with a Movie Camera is a 1929 Soviet silent documentary film. Man with a Movie Camera may also refer to:

- Man with a Movie Camera (Biosphere album), a 2001 ambient soundtrack for the film
- Man with a Movie Camera (The Cinematic Orchestra album), a 2003 jazz electronica soundtrack for the film

== See also ==
- Man with a Camera, an American television crime drama starring Charles Bronson
