= Sun Electric =

German electronic music group

Sun Electric is a German electronic music group, hailing from Berlin. Their first release was the single "O'Locco" on the Wau! Mr. Modo label in 1990, with numerous subsequent releases on the R&S / Apollo labels throughout the following decade. According to Philipp Sherburne, Sun Electric initially released "straight-ahead Frankfurt trance, but by the mid '90s they were masters of elastic rhythms and silvery leads. Their albums Present and Via Nostra [...] are underrated masterpieces of late-'90s electronica." The band has been influential within techno, trance, ambient and intelligent dance music (IDM) genres.

Principal members of the band are Tom Thiel and Max Loderbauer, with Thomas Fehlmann acting as executive producer on some of their releases. Notable releases include Kitchen (1993), Aaah! (1994), 30.7.94 Live (1994), Present (1996), and Via Nostra (1999). The band has also recorded under the name S.E. Berlin.

The band has worked with graphic artist and videographer Nick Philip on their music videos, and their video "Meccano" was created for and the first video to be played on the MTV series Amp.
