= Endurium =

Endurium may refer to:

- Endurium, a fictional crystalline element originally invented for the 1986 science fiction video game Starflight
- "Endurium", the last track on the 2001 Biosphere double album Substrata 2
