= Patashnik =

- Original Apollo cover

Studio album by Biosphere
- Released: 1994
- Genre: Ambient, IDM, ambient house
- Length: 66:04
- Label: Apollo; Origo Sound
- Producer: Geir Jenssen

Biosphere chronology
Microgravity (1992)	Patashnik (1994)	Insomnia (1997)

Professional ratings
Review scores
Source	Rating
AllMusic	4/5 stars

Patashnik is the second album by ambient house musician Biosphere. It was originally released in 1994 by Origo Sound in Norway and by Apollo in the rest of the world. Its track "Novelty Waves" was used for a 1995 Levi's ad campaign.

== Overview ==
According to Jenssen, the word patashnik is allegedly Russian cosmonaut slang for "a traveler" or "a goner", a cosmonaut who didn't return from a space mission because his security cable disengaged and he was lost in space. There appears to be no such word in contemporary Russian, but such surnames do exist, and it still sheds light on Jenssen's intent with the title.

Through Patashnik, Jenssen continued to explore his ambient-house stylings to an even greater extent. Patashnik contained the first hints of the reduction in beat-driven song structure that would mark later Biosphere releases. Unlike the first album, Patashnik was quickly picked up by a comparatively large international audience, which brought Biosphere greater recognition. A music video made for the track "The Shield" was often played on MTV's Chill Out Zone show.

In 1995, Levi Strauss & Co. was searching for a new angle to add to their television advertisement campaign (which up to that point had never featured electronic music), and they decided to use the uptempo track "Novelty Waves" from Patashnik. Shortly thereafter, "Novelty Waves" was released as a single (featuring remixes by various other artists) and managed to chart in several countries. Although Jenssen never regretted his approval for use of the track, he also never sought this kind of fame and subsequently turned down various requests by his record company and peers to collaborate with well-known techno and drum 'n bass artists or to create a follow-up album in the same style.

In 2007, Patashnik was reissued by Beatservice Records with a new cover and the same contents.

== Track listing ==
1. "Phantasm" – 4:50
2. "Startoucher" – 5:02
3. "Decryption" – 6:04
4. "Novelty Waves" – 6:27
5. "Patashnik" – 6:13
6. "Mir" – 5:18
7. "The Shield" – 8:54
8. "SETI Project" – 5:58
9. "Mestigoth" – 1:43
10. "Botanical Dimensions" – 5:43
11. "Caboose" – 5:12
12. "En-Trance" – 4:40

In addition to the title track, two other track titles are space references: "Mir", referring to the Mir space station, and "SETI Project", referring to the search for extraterrestrial intelligence.

== Charts ==
Chart (1994)	Peak position
UK Albums (OCC)	50

== Credits ==
All tracks written by Geir Jenssen, except "Botanical Dimensions" (written by Karsten Brustad, arranged and remixed by Geir Jenssen). "The Shield" was commissioned by Concerts Norway. 2007 reissue: With "Thanks to Helge Gaarder (1953–2004)"; CD photography and design by Hanne Brochmann.

== Samples ==
As is usual in Biosphere's music, the album incorporates several known or obscure speech samples:

- Track 1: Phantasm – "We had a dream last night. We had the same dream" speech from the movie The Krays
- Track 2: Startoucher – "So, you're really into this space stuff...?" speech from the movie SpaceCamp
- Track 3: Decryption – "So frightening to lose yourself..." speech from the movie Scanners
- Track 5: Patashnik – "Получаю данные, восемнадцать тридцать восемь" speech in Russian (English translation is "Receiving data, 18 38") from the movie 2010: The Year We Make Contact at 01:04:32
- Track 7: The Shield – "Will I dream?"/"What do you mean?" speech from the movie 2010
- Track 8: SETI Project – "Can you imagine, an extraterrestrial disc jockey..." speech from the movie SpaceCamp
