= Martin Franklin =

Martin Franklin may refer to:

- Martin Franklin (musician), leader of the ambient group Tuu
- Martin E. Franklin (born 1964), British-born, New York-based business executive
