= Insomnia (soundtrack) =

Soundtrack album by Biosphere
- Released: March 1997
- Genre: Ambient
- Length: 49:21
- Label: Origo Sound
- Producer: Geir Jenssen

Biosphere chronology
Patashnik (1994)	Insomnia (1997)	Substrata (1997)

Alternative cover
- Reissue cover

Professional ratings
Review scores
Source	Rating
Allmusic	4/5 stars

Insomnia is the soundtrack album for the 1997 Norwegian film Insomnia, composed by ambient artist Biosphere (Geir Jenssen). Released through the Norwegian record label Origo Sound, the tone of the album is much darker than Biosphere's earlier work, exemplified by the tracks "Field" and "Quay". The soundtrack was reissued in 2007 by the Norwegian label Beatservice Records.

== Production ==
Geir Jenssen knew Erik Skjoldbjærg, the director of the film in question, from the early 1980s, and they had collaborated on "smaller projects". Jenssen reportedly spent three months crafting the soundtrack.

Just two months later, the next Biosphere album was released, Substrata.

== Reception ==
Rating the soundtrack with a dice throw of 5 (out of 6), Dagbladet praised Biosphere for creating a record that stood independently of the film. The music took a "fluctuating, dreamlike" character, but had "substance" and did not dissolve "into the stratosphere". Stavanger Aftenblad lauded the soundtrack as "good, at times very good". Biosphere "paints forth fever-hot moods", while also being "subterranean and cold" which stood in stark contrast to the previous "otherworldly and beautiful" atmosphere of Patashnik. The music of Insomnia would "penetrate the central nervous system" and feel uncanny to listen to while alone. Insomnia was also markedly less rhythmic than Patashnik, but had "a distinct, regular, suggestive pulse". On its own, the music managed to conjure the "uneasy" mood also found in the film.

Verdens Gang rated it slightly lower, with 4 pips on the dice, arguing that while the music was "very fascinating", it depended on the listener being in the right mood, and in any event that kind of music was not for everyone. Vårt Land opined that some songs did not fully function independently of the film; however, most of the soundtrack was intriguing, exploring the "interactions between the beauty of nature and the murkiness of the mind, and erasing the barriers between them". The film also got dice throws of 4 from Bladet Tromsø and Østlendingen, and 3 from Drammens Tidende.

== Track listing ==
All tracks are written by Geir Jenssen.

No.	Title	Length
1.	"Proem"	3:16
2.	"Lounge"	2:29
3.	"Forum"	4:15
4.	"Field"	4:37
5.	"Probe"	1:30
6.	"Yard"	1:17
7.	"Shade"	2:26
8.	"Ride"	2:44
9.	"Chamber"	2:25
10.	"2nd Field"	5:41
11.	"Rush"	1:33
12.	"Transit"	1:47
13.	"Visit"	1:28
14.	"Gate"	1:39
15.	"Quay"	3:08
16.	"Tunnel"	5:39
17.	"Insomnia (Alanïa Mix)"	3:27
Total length:		49:21

== Personnel ==
- Biosphere – writer, producer
- Mia Kaarinadotter – vocals
- Harald Lervik – design (cover)
- Peter Tubaas – design (cover)
- Ina Grantenberg Design – artwork
- Torunn Nilsen – photography (still photos)
- Hanne Brochmann – design, photography (reissue)
