= Man with a Movie Camera (Biosphere album) =

Studio album by Biosphere
- Released: 2001
- Recorded: 1996
- Genre: Ambient
- Label: Touch Records
- Producer: Geir Jenssen

Biosphere chronology
Substrata² (2001)	Man with a Movie Camera (2001)	Shenzhou (2002)

Professional ratings
Review scores
Source	Rating
Allmusic	4/5 stars

Man with a Movie Camera is an ambient soundtrack by Biosphere for Dziga Vertov's 1929 film Man with a Movie Camera, commissioned by the Tromsø International Film Festival in 1996. This soundtrack was released later in 2001 as a bonus disc of Substrata 2 with two bonus tracks ("The Eye of the Cyclone" and "Endurium") from the Japanese version of Substrata.

== Track listing ==
=== The original soundtrack ===
1. "Prologue" – 0:19
2. "The Silent Orchestra" – 7:52
3. "City Wakes Up" – 5:58
4. "Freeze-Frames" – 6:46
5. "Manicure" – 4:43
6. "The Club" – 1:57
7. "Ballerina" – 7:50

=== As Substrata² bonus disc / digital reissue ===
1. "Prologue" – 0:19
2. "The Silent Orchestra" – 7:52
3. "City Wakes Up" – 5:58
4. "Freeze-Frames" – 6:46
5. "Manicure" – 4:43
6. "The Club" – 1:57
7. "Ballerina" – 7:50
8. "The Eye of the Cyclone"* – 7:22
9. "Endurium"* – 10:47

(* bonus tracks, appear on the second CD in the 2001 Substrata² release and the 2006 digital reissue, but are originally featured as Japanese-only bonus tracks from the original Substrata 1997 Japanese release.)
