= The North Pole by Submarine =

Studio album by Bleep
- Released: 1990
- Genre: Acid techno; new beat; house; pop
- Length: 52:19 (CD); 43:25 (LP)
- Label: SSR
- Producer: Bleep

The North Pole by Submarine is the only album released by ambient techno artist Bleep. Bleep was the one-time moniker of Geir Jenssen, who is more widely known as Biosphere. Shortly after North Pole was released, Jenssen moved in a far more ambient direction with his music, and changed the name under which he released his new music to avoid any comparison with "bleep house".

The album was released on SSR Records (sub-label of Crammed Discs) and Tokuma Japan Communications music labels.

== Critical reception ==
Professional ratings
Review scores
Source	Rating
AllMusic	2/5 stars
The Virgin Encyclopedia of Dance Music	3/5 stars

In his book Ocean of Sound (1995), David Toop described The North Pole by Submarine as "a promising Belgian New Beat/acid album" and noted how some of the record is sampled from radio transmissions. In a retrospective review, John Bush of AllMusic wrote how the "pre-Biosphere album" contains "few ambient tones", instead focusing on "heavy house/pop rhythms and acid effects" to create music aimed exclusively at dancefloors.

== Track listing ==
1. "A Byte of AMC" – 4:17
2. "The Operator" – 6:09
3. "Mr. Barth in the Sahara" – 6:18
4. "A Fading Dream" – 5:05
5. "The Conway Saddle" – 6:17
6. "The Snake" – 4:49
7. "Cycle 92" – 5:33
8. "In Your System" – 4:57
9. "Sure Be Glad When You're Dead" – 4:37
10. "A Byte of AMC (The Wrong Floppy Mix)" – 4:17

== Notes ==
- The vocal samples are taken from "Azax Attra: Desert Equations" release by Richard Horowitz and Sussan Deyhim recorded in 1987.
- The tracks "Sure Be Glad When You're Dead" and "A Byte of AMC (The Wrong Floppy Mix)" were not included on the LP release.
