= Microgravity (album) =

Studio album by Biosphere
- Released: 1991
- Genre: Ambient house, ambient techno
- Length: 47:11
- Label: Origo Sound; Apollo
- Producer: Geir Jenssen

Biosphere chronology
Microgravity (1991)	Patashnik (1994)

Professional ratings
Review scores
Source	Rating
AllMusic	5/5 stars
Select	4/5

Microgravity is the debut studio album by Norwegian electronic musician Geir Jenssen under the stage name Biosphere, released in 1991.

The album was at first rejected by SSR, the subsidiary of Nettwerk with whom Jenssen had previously released his music, as "unmarketable". The small Norwegian label Origo Sound picked it up, and the record scored on the club circuit in 1991.

At the end of 2014, Geir Jenssen launched a successful Kickstarter campaign to re-release the album on vinyl.

== Track listing ==
All tracks are written by Geir Jenssen

No.	Title	Length
1.	"Microgravity"	5:12
2.	"Baby Satellite"	5:04
3.	"Tranquilizer"	8:18
4.	"The Fairy Tale"	4:53
5.	"Cloudwalker II"	5:26
6.	"Chromosphere"	3:28
7.	"Cygnus-A"	5:02
8.	"Baby Interphase"	5:07
9.	"Biosphere"	4:41

== Personnel ==
- Geir Jenssen – production, writing
- Alexander Stojanovic – editing
