= Beyond Records =

Beyond Records was an English record label founded in Birmingham in 1992, best known for its ambient dub compilations, which were to define the genre.

The label was set up by Mike Barnett, who had previous experience within the music industry in management and as a music agent, and who established the label in order to release music that satisfied his interest in contemporary electronic dance music and 1970s ambient music by artists such as Terry Riley. The label worked closely with Higher Intelligence Agency and Rockers Hi-Fi, and was closely involved in the Oscillate club, which was to host many of the early performances by ambient dub's pioneers.
