= United Kingdoms (album) =

Studio album by Ultramarine
- Released: August 1993
- Genre: Electronic
- Label: Blanco y Negro
- Producer: Ultramarine

Ultramarine chronology
Every Man and Woman Is a Star (1991)	United Kingdoms (1993)	Bel Air (1995)

Professional ratings
Review scores
Source	Rating
Allmusic	3/5 stars

United Kingdoms is an experimental album released in 1993 by the British electronic band Ultramarine on Blanco y Negro Records. The album fuses ambient music and electronica with elements of English folk music, and features guest vocals from Robert Wyatt.

The song "Happy Land" uses a sample originating in "The Yellow Snake" by The Incredible String Band from their 1968 album Wee Tam and the Big Huge.

The album spent one week on the UK Album Chart, peaking at No. 49.

The lead single from the album was "Kingdom", which spent two weeks on the UK Singles Chart, peaking at No. 46.

A further single, The Barefoot EP was released later, containing remixed versions of four tracks from the album, which peaked at No. 61.

== Track listing ==
1. "Source" – 5:35
2. "Kingdom" – 4:52
3. "Queen of the Moon" – 5:45
4. "Prince Rock" – 4:40
5. "Happy Land" – 4:46
6. "Urf" – 4:44
7. "English Heritage" – 8:53
8. "Instant Kitten" – 2:27
9. "The Badger" – 5:59
10. "Hooter" – 4:50
11. "Dizzy Fox" – 8:01
12. "No Time" – 4:30
