= Cho Oyu 8201m – Field Recordings from Tibet =

2006 ambient album by Geir Jenssen

Cho Oyu 8201m – Field Recordings From Tibet

Live album (Field recordings) by Geir Jenssen
- Released: October 10, 2006
- Recorded: September–October 2001, Cho Oyu
- Venue: Cho Oyu
- Genres: Ambient, field recording
- Length: 48:15
- Label: Ash International

Geir Jenssen chronology
Dropsonde (2006)	Cho Oyu 8201m – Field Recordings From Tibet (2006)	Wireless: Live at the Arnolfini, Bristol (2009)

Professional ratings
Review scores
Source	Rating
AllMusic	4/5 stars

Cho Oyu 8201m – Field Recordings From Tibet is an ambient album released by artist Biosphere under his real name Geir Jenssen. Recorded in 2001, it was released in 2006.

== Overview ==
Geir Jenssen is an active climber and mountaineer, a hobby which is an inspiration on his work as well as a source of natural sound samples. His highest feat was in September–October 2001 when he climbed the Cho Oyu (Himalaya) without supplementary oxygen. Exactly five years later in October 2006, he released this album of field recordings made during the trip, as a "sources" companion of sorts to his album Dropsonde released in vinyl one year earlier, and which used some of those field recordings as raw material.

The album is released in a 142 mm by 162 mm card stock sleeve, and includes the 12-page booklet "Only Krishna and I: With Adventure Peaks to Cho Oyu", a diary of Jenssen's climb.

== Track listing ==
1. "Zhangmu: Crossing a Landslide Area" – 4:25
2. "Tingri: The Last Truck" – 5:23
3. "Jobo Rabzang" – 2:55
4. "Chinese Base Camp: Near a Stone Shelter" – 4:28
5. "Palung: A Yak Caravan Is Coming" – 4:56
6. "Cho Oyu Base Camp: Morning" – 8:34
7. "Nangpa La: Birds Feeding on Biscuits" – 5:09
8. "Camp 1: Himalayan Nightflight" – 2:38
9. "Camp 1.5: Mountain upon Mountain" – 1:35
10. "Camp 2: World Music on the Radio" – 3:25
11. "Camp 3: Neighbours on Oxygen" – 2:16
12. "Summit" – 2:31
