= Waveform Records =

- Type: Independent Record Label
- Industry: Music
- Founded: Sedona, AZ (1994)
- Headquarters: Maui, HI, USA
- Key people: F.J. Forest, Managing Director
- Products: Exotic Electronica
- Website: https://www.waveformrecords.com/

Waveform Records is an American record label founded in 1994 in Sedona, Arizona with subsequent relocations in the San Francisco Bay Area in Mill Valley, Austin, San Diego and is currently now based in Maui. Waveform specializes in a "sensual and stimulating genre of chill and ambient music" that the label calls "exotic electronica".

They are perhaps best known for a widely influential series of ambient dub compilations in the mid-1990s: One A.D., Two A.D., Three A.D., and Four A.D.

== Notable artists ==
- Higher Intelligence Agency
- Liquid Zen
- Loop Guru
- Phutureprimitive
- Sounds from the Ground
- Tuu

== See also ==
- List of record labels
