= N-Plants =

Studio album by Biosphere
- Released: 27 June 2011
- Genre: Ambient house; IDM
- Length: 49:50
- Label: Touch
- Producer: Geir Jenssen

Biosphere chronology
Wireless: Live at the Arnolfini, Bristol (2009)	N-Plants (2011)

Professional ratings
Review scores
Source	Rating
Allmusic	Favorable
Pitchfork Media	8.0/10
Dusted Magazine	(positive)
Peek-a-boo Magazine	83/100

N-Plants is an ambient album by Norwegian producer Geir Jenssen, a.k.a. Biosphere. For this album, Jenssen found inspiration in the Japanese post-war economic miracle. Each track title is named after a Japanese nuclear plant.

Geir Jenssen about N-Plants:

Early February 2011: Decided to make an album inspired by the Japanese post-war economic miracle. While searching for more information I found an old photo of the Mihama nuclear plant. The fact that this futuristic-looking plant was situated in such a beautiful spot so close to the sea made me curious. Are they safe when it comes to earthquakes and tsunamis? Further reading revealed that many of these plants are situated in earthquake-prone areas, some of them are even located next to shores that had been hit in the past by tsunamis. [sic]

A photo of Mihama made me narrow down my focus only to Japanese nuclear plants. I wanted to make a soundtrack to some of them, concentrating on the architecture, design and localizations, but also questioning the potential radiation danger (a cooling system being destroyed by a landslide or earthquake, etc). As the head of the Nuclear and Industrial Safety Agency said: "the plants were so well designed that 'such a situation is practically impossible'.

The album was finished on February 13th. On March 17th I received the following message from a Facebook friend: 'Geir, some time ago you asked people for a photo of a Japanese nuclear powerplant. Is this going to be the sleeve of your new coming album? But more importantly: how did you actually predict the future? Kind regards, David.'"

== Track listing ==
1. "Sendai-1" – 8:01
2. "Shika-1" – 7:54
3. "Jōyō" – 5:31
4. "Ikata-1" – 5:05
5. "Monju-1" – 2:42
6. "Genkai-1" – 6:37
7. "Ōi-1" – 5:10
8. "Monju-2 – "3:58
9. "Fujiko" – 4:56

== Credits ==
All tracks written and performed by Geir Jenssen. Photography by Yusuke Murakami. Mastered by Denis Blackham.
