= La mer (Debussy) =

Orchestral composition by Claude Debussy

- by Claude Debussy
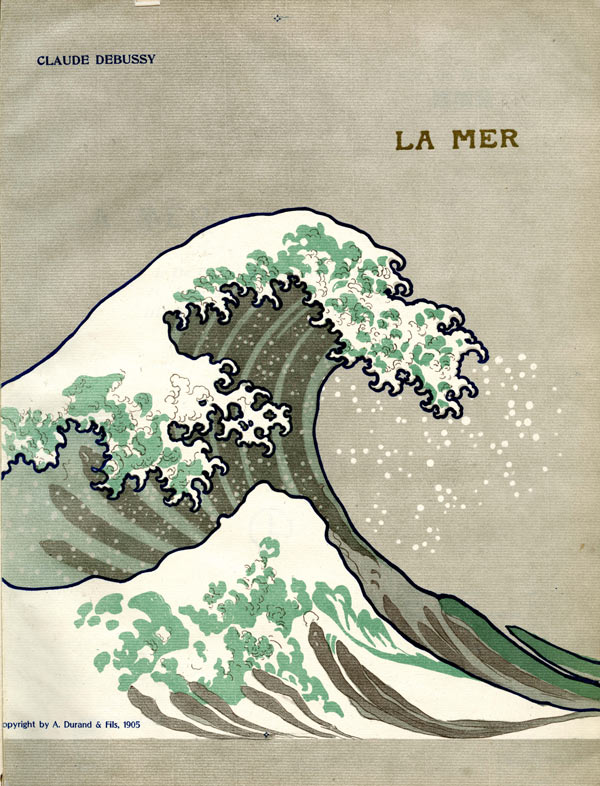
- The first edition of La mer, featuring The Great Wave off Kanagawa
- English: The Sea
- Catalogue: L. 109
- Genre: Impressionism
- Composed: August 1903 – 5 March 1905

Premiere
- Date: 15 October 1905; 120 years ago
- Conductor: Camille Chevillard
- Performers: Orchestre Lamoureux

La mer, trois esquisses symphoniques pour orchestre (French for The sea, three symphonic sketches for orchestra), or simply La mer (The Sea), L. 109, CD. 111, is an orchestral composition by the French composer Claude Debussy.

Composed between 1903 and 1905, the piece premiered in Paris in October 1905. It was initially not well-received; even some who had been strong supporters of Debussy's work were unenthusiastic, even though La mer presented three key aspects of Debussy's aesthetic: Impressionism, Symbolism and Japonism. The work was performed in the US in 1907 and Britain in 1908; after its second performance in Paris in 1908, it quickly became one of Debussy's most admired and frequently performed orchestral works.

The first audio recording of the work was made in 1928. Since then, orchestras and conductors from around the world have set it down in many studio or live concert recordings.

== Background and composition ==
Debussy photographed by Otto Wegener, probably a few years after the composition of La mer

I. "De l'aube à midi sur la mer"

II. "Jeux de vagues"

III. "Dialogue du vent et de la mer"
Performed by the United States Air Force Band

La mer was the second of Debussy's three orchestral works in three sections, the other being Nocturnes (1892–1899) and Images pour orchestre (1905–1912). The first, the Nocturnes, premiered in Paris in 1901 and though it had not made any great impact on the public, it was well-reviewed by musicians including Paul Dukas, Alfred Bruneau and Pierre de Bréville. (Note: The 1901 performance was the premiere of the complete work: two of the three Nocturnes had been played the previous year.) Debussy conceived the idea of a more complex tripartite orchestral piece and began work in August 1903. He began composing the work while visiting his parents-in-law in Burgundy; by the time it was complete, he had left his wife and was living with Emma Bardac, who was pregnant with Debussy's child.

Debussy retained fond childhood memories of the beauties of the sea but when composing La mer, he rarely visited it, spending most of his time far away from large bodies of water. He drew inspiration from art, "preferring the seascapes available in painting and literature" to the physical sea. Although the detailed scheme of the work changed during its composition, Debussy decided from the outset that it was to be "three symphonic sketches" with the title La mer. In a letter to André Messager, he described the planned sections as "Mère belle aux Îles Sanguinaires", "Jeu de vagues", and "Le vent fait danser la mer". (Note: Respectively, "Beautiful mother of the Îles Sanguinaires" (a small island group in the Mediterranean), "Play of the waves" and "The wind makes the sea dance".) The first of these, inspired by a short story of the same name by Camille Mauclair, was abandoned in favour of a less restrictive theme, the sea from dawn to midday. The last was also dropped as it was too reminiscent of ballet and the less specific theme of the dialogue between the wind and the sea took its place.

Debussy completed La mer on 5 March 1905 and took the proofs to correct on holiday at the Grand Hotel in Eastbourne on the English Channel coast when he went there on 23 July 1905; he described Eastbourne to his publisher, Durand, as "a charming peaceful spot: the sea unfurls itself with an utterly British correctness". He arranged the piece for piano four hands in 1905; in 1909, Durand published a second edition of La mer with the composer's revisions.

== Analysis ==
La mer is scored for 2 flutes, piccolo, 2 oboes, cor anglais, 2 clarinets in A, 3 bassoons, contrabassoon, 4 French horns, 3 trumpets in F, 2 cornets in C (3rd movement only), 3 trombones, tuba, timpani, bass drum, cymbals, triangle, tam tam, glockenspiel, 2 harps and strings.

A typical performance of the piece lasts about 23 or 24 minutes. (Note: Conductors have adopted a wide range of tempi for the work. Piero Coppola's second recording plays for less than 21 minutes and a recording of a performance under Sergiu Celibidache, issued by EMI in 2003, plays for a total of 33 minutes and 11 seconds.) It is in three movements:

1. "De l'aube à midi sur la mer" – très lent – animez peu à peu
2. "Jeux de vagues" – allegro (dans un rythme très souple) – animé
3. "Dialogue du vent et de la mer" – animé et tumultueux – cédez très légèrement

The titles are usually translated as:

1. "From dawn to noon on the sea" or "From dawn to midday on the sea" – very slow – animate little by little (B minor, c. 9:00)
2. "Play of the Waves" – allegro (with a very versatile rhythm) – animated (C♯ minor, c. 6:30)
3. "Dialogue of the wind and the sea" or "Dialogue between wind and waves" – animated and tumultuous, ease up very slightly (C♯ minor, c. 8:00)

Debussy called La mer "three symphonic sketches," deliberately avoiding the term symphony. Simon Trezise, in his 1994 book Debussy: La Mer, comments: "He had not composed an orthodox symphony, but neither did he want La mer to be known as a symphonic poem ... [and by calling it] 'Three symphonic sketches' ... [Debussy] must have felt that he had deftly avoided association with either genre". The work has sometimes been called a symphony, including by Debussy himself. It consists of two powerful outer movements framing a lighter, faster piece which acts as a type of scherzo. Jean Barraqué described La mer as the first work to have an "open" form – a devenir sonore or "sonorous becoming... a developmental process in which the very notions of exposition and development coexist in an uninterrupted burst". Trezise says "motifs are constantly propagated by derivation from earlier motifs".

Trezise writes that "for much of La Mer, Debussy spurns the more obvious devices associated with the sea, wind, and concomitant storm in favour of his own, highly individual vocabulary". Caroline Potter, in The Cambridge Companion to Debussy, comments that Debussy's depiction of the sea "avoids monotony by using a multitude of water figurations that could be classified as musical onomatopoeia: they evoke the sensation of swaying movement of waves and suggest the pitter-patter of falling droplets of spray" (and so forth), and–significantly–avoid the arpeggiated triads used by Schubert and Wagner to evoke the movement of water. In The Cambridge Companion to Debussy, Mark DeVoto describes La mer as "much more complex than anything Debussy had written earlier", particularly the Nocturnes:

…the phrases are more freely shaped and more smoothly blended from one to the next. Timbral and textural changes, with spare and widely spaced textures and abundant instrumental solos, occur in La mer more frequently than in 'Sirenes', often with dizzying rapidity.

The author, musicologist and pianist Roy Howat has observed, in his book Debussy in Proportion, that the formal boundaries of La mer correspond exactly to the mathematical ratios called the Golden Section. Trezise finds the intrinsic evidence "remarkable", but cautions that no written or reported evidence suggests that Debussy consciously sought such proportions.

== Reception ==
The premiere was given on 15 October 1905 in Paris by the Orchestre Lamoureux under the direction of Camille Chevillard. The piece was initially not well received. Pierre Lalo, critic of Le Temps, hitherto an admirer of Debussy's work, wrote: "I do not hear, I do not see, I do not smell the sea". (Note: Lalo objected to what he felt was the artificiality of the piece: "a reproduction of nature; a wonderfully refined, ingenious and carefully composed reproduction, but a reproduction none the less".) Another Parisian critic, Louis Schneider, wrote, "The audience seemed rather disappointed: they expected the ocean, something big, something colossal, but they were served instead with some agitated water in a saucer". When the conductor Karl Muck gave the first American performances of La mer, March 1907, the critic Henry Krehbiel wrote:

Last night's concert began with a lot of impressionistic daubs of color smeared higgledy-piggledy on a tonal palette, with never a thought of form or purpose except to create new combinations of sounds. … One thing only was certain, and that was that the composer's ocean was a frog-pond and that some of its denizens had got into the throat of every one of the brass instruments. (Note: Krehbiel, whose dislike of French music was well known, was obliged to recant once La mer had become a standard repertory work. In 1922, he called it "a poetic work in which Debussy has so wondrously caught the rhythms and colors of the seas".)

The work was not performed in Britain until 1 February 1908, when the composer – though a reluctant conductor (Note: His reluctance was overcome on that occasion by the unusually large fee offered him by Henry Wood and his backer, Sir Edgar Speyer.) – gave a performance at the Queen's Hall; the work was enthusiastically reviewed in The Times, but The Observer thought it lacked "real force of elemental strength". The Manchester Guardian thought the work an advance on Debussy's earlier work in some respects, although "the vagueness of thematic outline is carried to hitherto unheard-of lengths", and found "moments of great beauty" in the work. The Musical Times reserved judgment but noted that the audience had been highly enthusiastic. Debussy commented that his music was more popular in London than in Paris.

One reason for the negative reception at the Paris premiere may have been public disapproval of Debussy's treatment of his wife, but another was the mediocre performance by the conductor and orchestra. Chevillard was a respected interpreter of the classics, but was not at home with new music. It was not until 19 January 1908, at the second performance of the work in Paris (conducted by the composer) that La mer became a success with the public. Trezise records that at the time, many felt the 1908 concert presented the real first performance of the piece.

Although some of Debussy's contemporaries drew analogies between La mer and French Impressionist paintings, much to the composer's irritation, others have detected the influence of his admiration for the English painter J. M. W. Turner and Debussy's choice of Hokusai's c. 1831 woodblock print The Great Wave off Kanagawa for the cover of the printed score indicates the influence of Japanese art on him. Despite Debussy's scorn for the term "impressionism" applied to his or anyone else's music, a matter on which he and Ravel were of the same firm opinion, the term was used by some of his most devoted admirers. His biographer Edward Lockspeiser called La mer "the greatest example of an orchestral Impressionist work" and more recently, in The Cambridge Companion to Debussy, Nigel Simeone commented, "It does not seem unduly far-fetched to see a parallel in Monet's seascapes".

The Grand Hotel, Eastbourne, where Debussy corrected the proofs of La mer in 1905

Decades after its premiere, La mer established itself in the core orchestral repertoire. In 2018, the online archive of the New York Philharmonic Orchestra reported that the orchestra had played the work at 135 concert performances since 1917, under conductors including Willem Mengelberg, Arturo Toscanini, John Barbirolli, Pierre Monteux, Leonard Bernstein, Pierre Boulez and Valery Gergiev. In 1979, The Musical Times rated La mer the composer's most important orchestral work. The pianist Sviatoslav Richter called La mer "A piece that I rank alongside the St Matthew Passion and the Ring cycle as one of my favourite works". (Note: Richter said further, on listening to his favourite recording (by Roger Désormière), "La mer again; shall I ever tire of listening to it, of contemplating it and breathing its atmosphere? And each time is like the first time! An enigma, a miracle of natural reproduction; no, even more than that, sheer magic!" Richter also mentioned two other Soviet admirers of the work: "One day, after listening to this work, Anna Ivanovna exclaimed, 'For me, it's exactly the same miracle as the sea itself!'". Richter also said that for his teacher, Heinrich Neuhaus, La mer was "the work by Debussy that he loved above all others ('Slava, put on La mer,' he almost always used to say whenever he came round here)". Of the Désormière recording, which he played for Neuhaus, Richter said it is "The most beautiful in the whole history of the gramophone".)

== Recordings ==
The first recording of La mer was made by the Orchestre de la Société des Concerts du Conservatoire, conducted by Piero Coppola in 1928. It has been reissued on LP and CD. Recordings conducted by other musicians who had known and worked with Debussy include those by Monteux and Ernest Ansermet, who both conducted the work on more than one recording. Well-known recordings from the monaural era include those by the NBC Symphony Orchestra and Toscanini, and the Philharmonia on recordings conducted by Herbert von Karajan and Guido Cantelli. Of recordings from the stereophonic LP era, The Penguin Guide to Recorded Classical Music singled out those by the Chicago Symphony Orchestra under Fritz Reiner, and the Berlin Philharmonic under Karajan.

Of the many recordings available, a comparative survey for Classic FM (2018) recommended a short list of five, those by the Orchestre National de France and Jean Martinon, the Cleveland Orchestra and Boulez, the Berlin Philharmonic and Simon Rattle, the Seoul Philharmonic and Myung-Whun Chung, and the Royal Concertgebouw Orchestra conducted by Bernard Haitink (its top recommendation).

== Influence ==
La mer has influenced a number of composers throughout the 20th century. British composers Frank Merrick and Hope Squire arranged La Mer for piano duet and performed it in 1915 in one of their new music recitals. Luciano Berio quoted La mer in the 3rd movement of his composition Sinfonia in 1968. (Note: Berio's piece also quotes music by Mahler, Stravinsky, Schoenberg, Ravel and Berg.) John Williams used simplified versions of motifs from La mer in his score for Jaws (1975). In 2002, the Norwegian composer Biosphere loosely based his ambient album Shenzhou around looped samples of La mer. The British composer Sally Beamish has arranged La Mer for piano trio. It was first performed in 2013.

== Notes, references and sources ==
=== Sources ===
==== Journal ====
- Barraqué, Jean (June 1988). "La Mer de Debussy, ou la naissance des formes ouverts". Analyse Musicale (in French) (12): 15–62.

==== Books ====
- DeVoto, Mark (2007). "The Debussy Sound: colour, texture, gesture". The Cambridge Companion to Debussy. Simon Trezise (ed). Cambridge: Cambridge University Press. ISBN 978-0-521-65243-8.
- Greenfield, Edward; Ivan March, Robert Layton and Paul Czajkowski (2008). The Penguin Guide to Recorded Classical Music. London: Penguin. ISBN 978-0-141-03335-8.
- Howat, Roy (1986). Debussy in Proportion: A Musical Analysis. Cambridge: Cambridge University Press. ISBN 978-0-521-31145-8.
- Jensen, Eric Frederick (2014). Debussy. Oxford and New York: Oxford University Press. ISBN 978-0-19-973005-6.
- Leary, William G.; James Steel Smith (1955). Thought and Statement. New York: Harcourt, Brace. OCLC 937334460.
- Monsaingeon, Bruno, ed. (2001). Sviatoslav Richter: Notebooks and Conversations. London: Faber & Faber. ISBN 978-0-571-20553-0.
- Orenstein, Arbie (2003) [1989]. A Ravel Reader. Mineola, US: Dover. ISBN 978-0-486-43078-2.
- Parris, Matthew (2008). Scorn. London: Little. ISBN 978-1-904435-98-3.
- Potter, Caroline (2007). "Debussy and Nature". The Cambridge Companion to Debussy. Simon Trezise (ed). Cambridge: Cambridge University Press. ISBN 978-0-521-65243-8.
- Sackville-West, Edward; Desmond Shawe-Taylor (1955). The Record Guide. London: Collins. OCLC 500373060.
- Simeone, Nigel (2007). "Debussy and Expression". The Cambridge Companion to Debussy. Simon Trezise (ed). Cambridge: Cambridge University Press. ISBN 978-0-521-65243-8.
- Trezise, Simon (1994). Debussy: La mer. Cambridge: Cambridge University Press. ISBN 978-0-521-44656-3.
- Wood, Henry J. (1938). My Life of Music. London: Victor Gollancz. OCLC 30533927.
