= Autour de la Lune =

Studio album by Biosphere
- Released: 17 May 2004
- Genre: Electronic; ambient; drone; minimalism
- Length: 74:23
- Label: Touch Records

Biosphere chronology
Shenzhou (2002)	Autour de la Lune (2004)	Dropsonde (2006)

Professional ratings
Review scores
Source	Rating
Allmusic	2.5/5 stars
Pitchfork	7.8/10

Autour de la Lune is an album by ambient musician Biosphere which was released on 17 May 2004. The album presents a striking difference from others in the Biosphere catalog due to its percussionless, minimalistic soundscapes consisting mostly of white noise and the sounds of the Mir space station, related to drone music. It featured cover art by the Norwegian contemporary artist Tor-Magnus Lundeby.

== Overview ==
Autour de la Lune stands as the most minimal and austere Biosphere album to date. The drones employed on this album are comparable to Coil's 1998 album Time Machines in their timbre and slow rate of change.

The bulk of this work was originally commissioned and broadcast in September 2003 by Radio France Culture for a musical evocation of Jules Verne. As a book, Autour de la Lune (1870, Around the Moon) was Jules Verne's sequel to his De la Terre à la Lune (1865, From the Earth to the Moon). The first one dealt with the Earth part of the story until the ship's launching, from the outside. Autour de la Lune dealt from the inside of the ship with the launching and the actual space travel to and around the moon.

== Track listing ==
1. "Translation" – 21:43
2. "Rotation" – 11:08
3. "Modifié" – 5:10
4. "Vibratoire" – 3:36
5. "Déviation" – 10:26
6. "Circulaire" – 6:15
7. "Disparu" – 2:26
8. "Inverse" – 5:32
9. "Tombant" – 8:07

The album's titles are French for "Translation", "Rotation", "Modified", "Vibratory", "Deviation", "Circular", "Vanished", "Reverse", "Falling", and evoke the movements of a rocket around the moon and back.

Track 3 consists of (among other sounds) a ring modulation of Sigur Rós' "Ný batterí".
