= Ultramarine (band) =

English electronic music duo

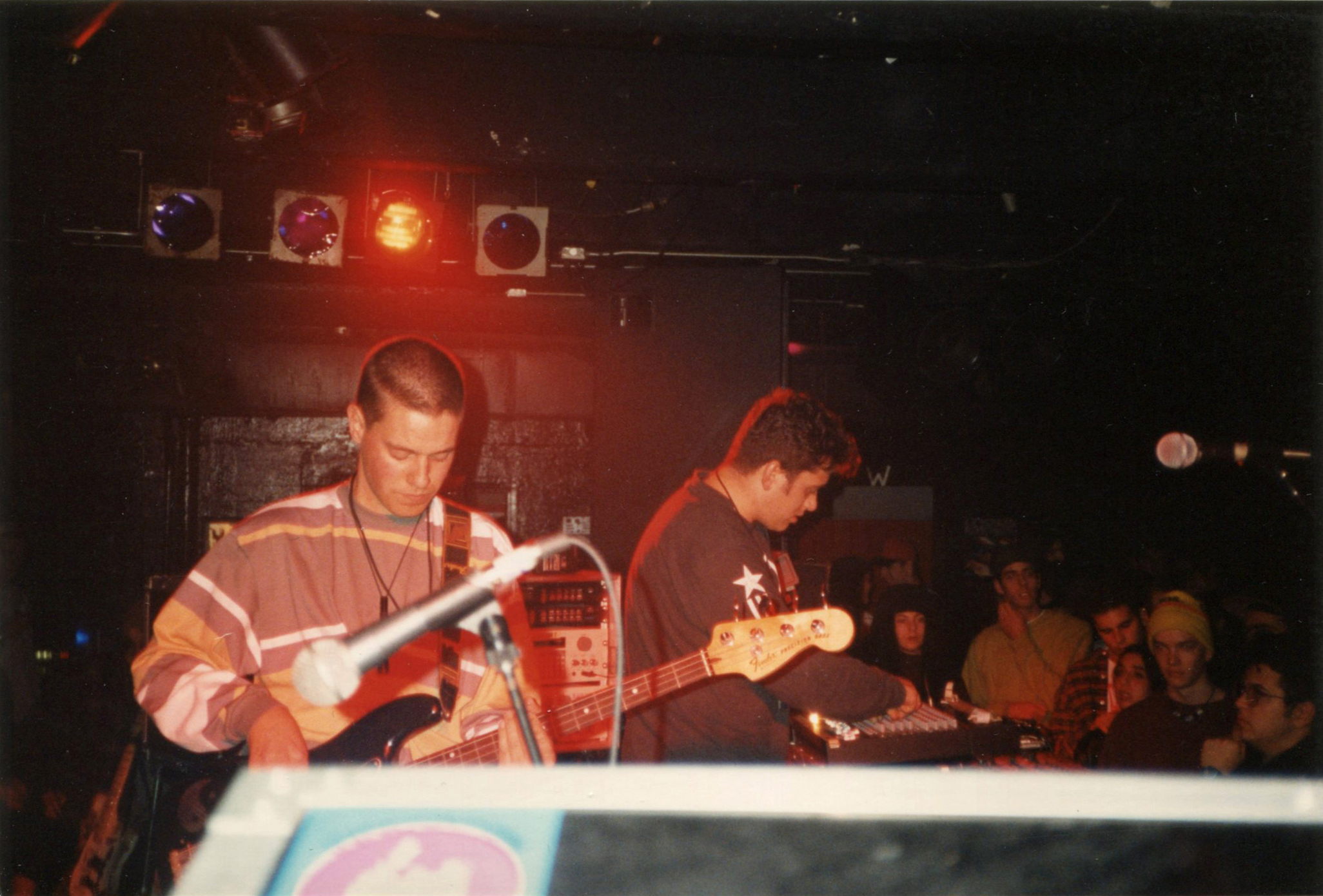
- Ultramarine performing at Axis, Boston, Massachusetts, United States, on 3 December 1992

Background information
- Origin: Essex, England
- Genres: House, ambient techno, folktronica
- Years active: 1989–present
- Labels: Les Disques du Crépuscule; Brainiak Records; Rough Trade; Blanco Y Negro; Sire; New Electronica; LTM; Real Soon
- Members: Ian Cooper; Paul Hammond
- Website: Official website

Ultramarine are an English electronic music duo, formed in 1989 by Ian Cooper and Paul Hammond. Their work blends elements of techno, house and ambient music with acoustic instrumentation, the influence of the 1970s Canterbury scene, and other eclectic sources. They are best known for their 1991 album Every Man and Woman Is a Star, reissued on Rough Trade the following year.

== Biography ==
Cooper and Hammond first worked together in the band, A Primary Industry, during the mid-1980s. Following the split of that band, they formed Ultramarine and released their debut album Folk in April 1990 on the Belgian label Les Disques du Crépuscule. The duo's second long player, Every Man and Woman Is a Star (initially released in 1991 by Brainiak Records and reissued as an expanded version by Rough Trade in 1992), was described by music writer Simon Reynolds in his book Energy Flash as "Perhaps the first and best stab at that seeming contradiction-in-terms, pastoral techno... all sun-ripened, meandering lassitude and undulant dub-sway tempos... like acid-house suffused with the folky-jazzy ambience of the Canterbury scene."

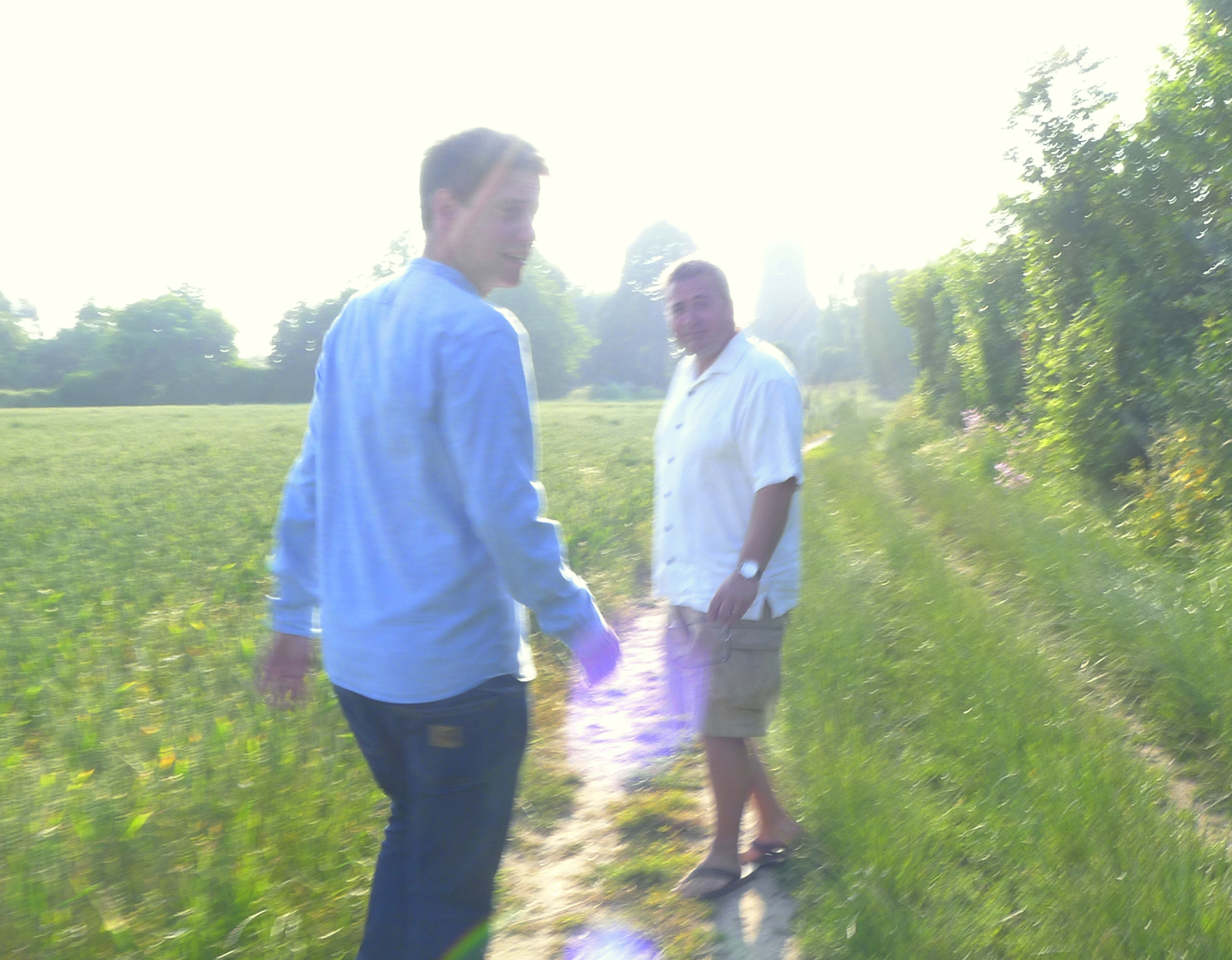
Ultramarine in Essex, 2013

Live appearances during this period included a US tour in 1992 with Meat Beat Manifesto and Orbital and US and European tours in 1993 supporting Björk. The group's collaborative work has included a songwriting and recording partnership with Robert Wyatt, recordings with Kevin Ayers and David McAlmont, plus numerous live and studio sessions with members of the London jazz scene, including Lol Coxhill, Elton Dean, Dave Green, Roger Beaujolais, Greg Heath and Jimmy Hastings.

Every Man and Woman Is a Star was followed by the albums United Kingdoms (1993), which features an extensive collaboration with Robert Wyatt, Bel Air (1995) and A User's Guide (1998). After a long sabbatical, the group released their sixth album, This Time Last Year in 2013. Every Man and Woman Is a Star was reissued by Rough Trade in 2014 as a triple vinyl set, including a previously unreleased 1992 John Peel BBC Radio 1 session.

Ultramarine simultaneously released a double-album Signals into Space and a mini-album Meditations on Les Disques du Crépuscule in 2019. Signals into Space includes songs written in collaboration with Anna Domino and contributions from saxophonist Iain Ballamy.

The group appears on Woo's album Arcturian Corridor (2020), remixing the track Arc II.

== Musicians ==
- Ian Harvey Cooper (born 15 August 1966, Derby, England)
- Paul John Hammond (born 7 December 1965, Chelmsford, Essex, England)

== Discography ==
=== Albums ===
- Folk (Les Disques du Crépuscule, 1990 / Foam on a Wave, Reissue 2020)
- Every Man and Woman Is a Star (Brainiak Records, 1991 / Rough Trade, 1992, Reissue 2014)
- United Kingdoms (Blanco Y Negro (UK); Sire (US), 1993)
- Bel Air (Blanco Y Negro, 1995)
- A User's Guide (New Electronica, 1998 / WRWTFWW, Reissue 2025)
- This Time Last Year (Real Soon, 2013)
- Signals into Space (Les Disques du Crépuscule, 2019)
- Meditations (Les Disques du Crépuscule / Real Soon, 2019)
- Send and Return (Blackford Hill, 2023)

=== Compilation albums ===
- Companion (LTM, 2003)

=== Singles and EPs ===
- Wyndham Lewis (Les Disques du Crépuscule, 1989)
- Stella (Les Disques du Crépuscule / Dancyclopaedia, 1990)
- Stella (Brainiak Records, 1991)
- Weird Gear / British Summertime (Brainiak Records, 1991)
- Saratoga / Nova Scotia (Rough Trade, 1992)
- Nightfall in Sweetleaf (Rough Trade, 1992)
- Kingdom (Blanco Y Negro, 1993)
- Barefoot (Blanco Y Negro, 1994)
- First Air (Blanco Y Negro, 1995)
- Sketches (Blanco Y Negro, 1995)
- Hymn (Blanco Y Negro, 1996)
- Hymn Remixes (Blanco Y Negro, 1996)
- On the Brink (New Electronica, 1998)
- Carl Craig Remixes (Real Soon, 2003)
- Find a Way (Real Soon, 2011)
- Acid / Butch (WNCL, 2011)
- Passwords (Real Soon, 2014)
- Peel Session 1992 (Rough Trade, 2014)
- Blackwaterside (Random Spectacular, 2018)
- Breathing (Real Soon / Les Disques du Crépuscule, 2018)
- Interiors (Blackford Hill, 2021)
- $10 Rework (Real Soon, 2022)
