= Every Man and Woman Is a Star =

Studio album by Ultramarine
- Released: 1991
- Genre: Electronica; ambient house; folktronica; techno; chillout
- Length: 70:50 (1992 release)
- Label: Brainiak, Rough Trade
- Producer: Ultramarine

Ultramarine chronology
Folk (1989)	Every Man and Woman Is a Star (1991)	United Kingdoms (1993)

Every Man and Woman Is a Star is the second album by British electronic music duo Ultramarine. It was originally released in 1991 by Brainiak Records; a subsequent 1992 reissue on Rough Trade featured two additional tracks.

The album has been described as an early classic of the ambient techno/house scene. Its pastoral sound and incorporation of traditional folk instruments made it a progenitor of the folktronica genre.

== Background ==
Every Man and Woman Is a Star was recorded in London and mixed in Brussels with assistance from Colin James of Meat Beat Manifesto. The recording involved collaborations with other musicians, an approach the group later expanded on. According to Ian Cooper, the duo used the Akai S900 sampler to create tracks: "to be able to experiment and write loop-based tracks opened new worlds of possibilities for us. We could gather '70s west coast musicians for an acoustic backing track and write synth melodies on top whilst never leaving the bedroom in New Cross." Hip hop sampling and bleep techno records were inspirations. In a 2015 interview, Paul Hammond recalled the process of recording the original album demos: "it came together so effortlessly. We still feel great warmth for the record and for the period it was made in."

The phrase "Every man and woman is a star" is originally attributed to occultist Aleister Crowley and is found in The Book of the Law. Hammond stated that "I think we liked the idea of the all-inclusive slightly hippyish sound of it, but it coming from quite a dark, esoteric source."

== Release ==
After its initial 1991 release on Brainiak, the album was reissued on Rough Trade Records in 1992 with additional tracks.

In 2003, a remixed and expanded version of the album entitled Companion was released. This included alternative mixes (from 1990 to 1993) and live versions of the original album tracks as well as all tracks from the 1992 EP Nightfall in Sweetleaf.

The 2015 reissue of the album on Rough Trade was prompted by label head Geoff Travis.

== Reception ==
Professional ratings
Review scores
Source	Rating
AllMusic	4.5/5 stars
Mojo	4/5 stars
NME	9/10
Q	3/5 stars
Select	4/5
Uncut	3.5/5 stars

Critic Simon Reynolds called the album "the first and best stab at that seeming contradiction-in-terms, pastoral techno," likening it to "acid house suffused with the folky-jazzy ambience of Roy Harper, John Martyn, and the Canterbury Scene." AllMusic called it "a warmly melodic LP of home-listening electronica produced just before the term was coined" and "an early ambient-techno classic." PopMatters stated that the album "fit right in with the psychedelic, ethereal 'ambient house' or 'chill out' music of acts like the Orb, KLF, and Aphex Twin," describing the duo as "nature-loving would-be hippies who [...] translated that pastoral ethos into music that was full of breezy, midtempo rhythms and shaded in with traditional instruments like violin and harmonica."

The album's pastoral sound and incorporation of traditional folk instruments have led critics to credit it as a progenitor of the folktronica genre.

== Track listing ==
=== Original version (1991) ===
1. "Discovery" – 4:26
2. "Weird Gear" – 5:09
3. "Pansy" – 5:16
4. "Honey" – 5:07
5. "Stella" – 4:24
6. "Geezer" – 6:32
7. "Panther" – 4:44
8. "British Summertime" – 8:45
9. "Lights in My Brain" – 5:34
10. "Gravity" – 4:35
11. "Canoe Trip" – 2:41
12. "Skyclad" – 5:28

=== Reissue (1992) ===
1. "Discovery" – 4:26
2. "Weird Gear" – 5:09
3. "Pansy" – 5:16
4. "Honey" – 5:07
5. "Stella" – 4:24
6. "British Summertime" – 6:45
7. "Saratoga" – 5:02
8. "Geezer" – 6:32
9. "Nova Scotia" – 5:07
10. "Panther" – 4:44
11. "Lights in My Brain" – 5:34
12. "Gravity" – 4:35
13. "Canoe Trip" – 2:41
14. "Skyclad" – 5:28

=== Companion (2003) ===
1. "Intro" – 1:05
2. "Weird Gear" (US Remix by Ultramarine) – 3:46
3. "Lights in My Brain" (Spooky Remix) – 6:25
4. "Geezer" (Sweet Exorcist Remix) – 6:01
5. "The Downer" – 1:07
6. "Panther" (Coco Steel & Lovebomb Remix) – 5:46
7. "Outro" – 1:33
8. "My First Canoe Trip" – 3:10
9. "Early Discovery" – 4:34
10. "Saratoga" (Remix) – 4:58
11. "Stella Connects" (Edit) – 7:57
12. "Lovelife #1" – 3:47
13. "Nova Scotia" – 4:26
14. "Old Geezer Dub" – 5:40
15. "Pansy" (Live at Glastonbury) – 6:09
