= Cirque (album) =

Studio album by Biosphere
- Released: 13 June 2000
- Genre: Ambient house; downtempo; IDM
- Length: 47:26
- Label: Touch Records

Biosphere chronology
Substrata (1997)	Cirque (2000)	Substrata² (2001)

Professional ratings
Review scores
Source	Rating
AllMusic	4/5 stars
Sputnikmusic	4/5 stars

Cirque is an album by ambient musician Biosphere, which was released in 2000.

Miss Kittin used "Le Grand Dôme" on her mix album A Bugged Out Mix.

Cirque is dedicated to the memory of Christopher McCandless.

== Track listing ==
1. "Nook and Cranny" – 4:02
2. "Le Grand Dôme" – 5:36
3. "Grandiflora" – 0:48
4. "Black Lamb and Grey Falcon" – 5:08
5. "Miniature Rock Dwellers" – 1:04
6. "When I Leave" – 5:54
7. "Iberia Eterea" – 6:38
8. "Moistened & Dried" – 2:25
9. "Algae & Fungi Part I" – 5:43
10. "Algae & Fungi Part II" – 5:17
11. "Too Fragile to Walk On" – 4:51

== Trivia ==
The sample used in "When I Leave" comes from the documentary Jupiter's Wife by Michel Negroponte (1995).
