= Present (Sun Electric album) =

Studio album by Sun Electric
- Released: 25 November 1996
- Recorded: Berlin
- Genre: Techno; breakbeat; IDM; downtempo; electronica
- Length: 67:29
- Label: Apollo
- Producer: Sun Electric

Sun Electric chronology
30.7.94 (1995)	Present (1996)	Via Nostra (1997)

Present is the third album by German techno duo Sun Electric, released in November 1996 by Belgian label Apollo Records. The duo's first full-length studio album for the label, the album is a return to Sun Electric's more beat-oriented material and incorporates styles of dub, jungle, IDM, breakbeat and downtempo. The album artwork by The Designer's Republic features a manipulated image similar to artworks of Madonna, reflecting the melancholic, fractured sound of the album. Music critics greeted Present favourably, praising its inventive style, and some have since recognised the record as overlooked.

== Background and composition ==
Sun Electric, consisting of Mac Loderbauer and Tom Thiel, formed in Berlin at the advice of their manager Thomas Fehlmann, and were considered pioneers of ambient house upon their emergence in 1990, drawing praise from fellow producers Alex Paterson and Jimmy Cauty of The Orb. After releasing their debut single on "O Locco" on Paterson's Wau! Mr. Lodo label, and negotiating a failed contract with ZTT, Sun Electric signed to Apollo Records, a subsidiary of R&S Records, and released their debut album Kitchen (1993). This was soon followed by the mini-album Aaah! CD (1994) and the live album 30.7.94 (1995), which featured co-production and "mentoring" from Fehlmann. Sun Electric produced Present in Berlin, with Fehlmann again acting as a musical consultant. He is credited in the liner notes as "Global Energy Consultant."

Present is a sophisticated, downtempo-styled techno album infused with dub music, featuring heavy synthesised stings and elements of ambient music. Fragmented and melancholic in style, the record also features hints of jungle and serial music, and is more beat-oriented than the more relaxed 30.7.94, with most tracks eschewing the trance-style rhythms of Kitchen and Aaah! CD in favour of a breakbeat-based IDM approach, according to writer Sean Cooper. Regardless of the jungle influences, few of the album's rhythms are reducible to drum and bass, with subtler beat layering and "rhythmic eruptions" comparable to experimental ambient techno acts like Tournesol and The Black Dog.

== Critical reception ==
Professional ratings
Review scores
Source	Rating
AllMusic	4/5 stars

Present was released by Apollo on 25 November 1996. The Designer's Republic provided the album photography and artwork, with the album cover "constructed of ribbons of the same image bitmapped with various digital texture." Insomniac ranked the cover at number 75 on their list of "100 Best Electronic Music Album Covers", with writer Dennis Kane writing: "Almost like a Madonna painting, but with the head horizontal not vertical, the art is fragmented and melancholy, like the music."

In a contemporary review, Sean Cooper of AllMusic named Present an "Album Pick", writing that while some listeners would criticise the perceived "jungle trendiness" of the album's "breakbeat, IDM tip", he found the album's rhythms more inventive than in that few of them are genuinely "drum'n'bass". Gert van Veen of de Volkskrant wrote that with the album, the duo "leaves its own mark in ambient and dance." He found the album to build on the styles of Kitchen and Aaah! CD, despite the passing musical climate, and wrote that the music is "subtle and adventurous," hailing how "even though the listener is regularly confronted with surprises, the album never ends up in endless experiments." He also felt the title was ironic as the album contained "hardly any echoes" of contemporary genres like trip hop and drum and bass, and that by "precisely by drawing their own line so clearly, Sun Electric has conquered its own place, which the group consolidates with this beautiful album." Zitty magazine described Present as a beautiful album "in a class of its own."

In a 2013, Tim Purdon of Fact included Present in the magazine's list "The 15 greatest techno albums you've never heard: Part 1", commenting that he finds the "classy" album to have "stood the test of the time much better than, say, UFOrb or Chill Out." In 2015, Pitchfork included "Stimpak" in the list "Emotional Intelligence: A Guide to Melodic IDM", with writer Philip Sherburne saying that by the mid-1990s, Sun Electric had become "masters of elastic rhythms and silvery leads." He hailed Present and its follow-up Via Nostra as "underrated masterpieces of late-'90s electronica." Dennis Kane of Insomniac reflected that the album has been "slept-on." Project Revolver named it one of the 22 best techno albums between 1989 and 1999.

== Track listing ==
All tracks written by Max Loderbauer and Tom Thiel, except "Waitati Post", written by Loderbauer, Thiel and Thomas Fehlmann.

1. "Spreewald" – 4:29
2. "Stimpak" – 3:34
3. "Eya" – 5:13
4. "Parallax" – 3:46
5. "Bagatto" – 5:50
6. "Crystal Ballore" – 7:30
7. "Goldstuck" – 4:56
8. "Quaila" – 5:36
9. "Waitati Post" – 6:08
10. "Tassajara" – 6:03
11. "Wassa" – 4:16
12. "In Vitro" – 5:46
13. "Uschba" – 4:27

== Personnel ==
Adapted from the liner notes of One World

- Max Loderbauer – production, writing
- Tom Thiel – production, writing
- Thomas Fehlmann – writing (track 9), music consultant
- The Designer's Republic – artwork, photography
