= Substrata (album) =

Studio album by Biosphere
- Released: June 1997
- Genre: Ambient
- Length: 58:26 (Original CD), 112:00 (2001 2CD), 73:01 (Vinyl)
- Label: All Saints
- Producer: Geir Jenssen

Biosphere chronology
| Insomnia (1997) | Substrata (1997) | Cirque (2000) |

Alternative cover
- Reissue cover

Substrata is the third studio album by Norwegian electronic musician Geir Jenssen under the stage name Biosphere, released in 1997 by All Saints Records.

It is Biosphere's first truly ambient album, and has a theme of cold, of mountains and glaciers, and of running water. Sounds of howling wind and creaking wood, although infrequently employed, create a chilling soundscape interrupted by sonorous but quietly suspenseful music.

In 2001, the album was re-released in a digitally remastered format with a second disc featuring a soundtrack for Dziga Vertov's 1929 film Man with a Movie Camera, as Substrata 2.

== Reception ==
Professional ratings
Review scores
| Source | Rating |
|---|---|
| AllMusic | 4.5/5 stars |
| Muzik | 8/10 |
| NME | 4/10 |
| Pitchfork | 8.8/10 |
| Sputnikmusic | 4.5/5 |

Substrata is considered to be a classic ambient music album, consistently ranking in the top 5 in surveys on the Hyperreal ambient mailing list.

In 2016, Pitchfork ranked it at number 38 on its list of the 50 Best Ambient Albums of All Time.

== Track listing ==
Original Album

All tracks are written by Geir Jenssen.

| No. | Title | Length |
|---|---|---|
| 1. | "As the Sun Kissed the Horizon" | 1:47 |
| 2. | "Poa Alpina" | 4:11 |
| 3. | "Chukhung" | 7:34 |
| 4. | "The Things I Tell You" | 6:28 |
| 5. | "Times When I Know You'll Be Sad" | 3:44 |
| 6. | "Hyperborea" | 5:45 |
| 7. | "Kobresia" | 7:12 |
| 8. | "Antennaria" | 5:04 |
| 9. | "Uva-Ursi" | 3:01 |
| 10. | "Sphere of No-Form" | 5:47 |
| 11. | "Silene" | 7:53 |
| Total length: | | 58:26 |

Substrata^{2} (2001 2CD Reissue)

Man With A Movie Camera
| No. | Title | Length |
|---|---|---|
| 1. | "Prologue" | 0:19 |
| 2. | "The Silent Orchestra" | 7:52 |
| 3. | "City Wakes Up" | 5:58 |
| 4. | "Freeze-Frames" | 6:46 |
| 5. | "Manicure" | 4:43 |
| 6. | "The Club" | 1:57 |
| 7. | "Ballerina" | 7:50 |

Japanese Tracks
| No. | Title | Length |
|---|---|---|
| 8. | "The Eye Of The Cyclone" | 7:22 |
| 9. | "Endurium" | 10:47 |
| Total length: | | 53:34 112:00 |

2011 Vinyl Reissue

| No. | Title | Length |
|---|---|---|
| 12. | "Laika" | 14:35 |
| Total length: | | 73:01 |

The 2017 2CD reissue adds "Laika" to the end of disc 2 for a total runtime of 126:35.

== Samples ==
- Track 4, "The Things I Tell You," contains a speech from Twin Peaks (Season 2, Episode 1) spoken by The Giant on his second visitation to Agent Cooper: "Sorry to wake you. [...] I forgot to tell you something. [...] The things I tell you will not be wrong."
- Track 5, "Times When I Know You'll Be Sad", interpolates a line from the popular song We'll Be Together Again.
- Track 6, "Hyperborea," contains a speech from Twin Peaks (same episode) from the scene where Major Briggs explains his vision to his son, Bobby: "This was a vision, fresh and clear as a mountain stream, the mind revealing itself to itself. In my vision, I was on the veranda of a vast estate, a palazzo of some fantastic proportion. There seemed to emanate from it a light from within, this gleaming, radiant marble. I'd known this place. I had in fact been born and raised there. This was my first return. A reunion with the deepest well-springs of my being. Wandering about, I noticed happily that the house had been immaculately maintained. There'd been added a number of additional rooms, but in a way that blended so seamlessly with the original construction, one would never detect any difference. Returning to the house's grand foyer, there came a knock at the door. My son was standing there. He was happy and carefree, clearly living a life of deep harmony and joy. We embraced, a warm and loving embrace, nothing withheld. We were, in this moment, one. My vision ended, and I awoke with a tremendous feeling of optimism and confidence in you and your future. That was my vision of you. I'm so glad to have had this opportunity to share it with you. I wish you nothing but the very best in all things."
- Track 7: "Kobresia" – "Это либо металл, либо... Если металл, то крашенный... холодная поверхность..." Audio sampled from a 1993 ABC documentary titled "Powers of the Russian Psychics", part of the "World of Discovery" series. The show included a two-minute segment (30:00 to 32:00) featuring Russian actor and telepath Karl Nikolaev, who is sitting in a room attempting to describe and guess which item a fellow psychic, Dr. Stanislav Panov, had chosen from a group of six objects lying on a table in a room ten floors above Nikolaev. The English translation of Nikolaev's monologue, taken directly from the segment, is: "It could be something metal...and if it's metal, it's painted and it has cold surface. It could be painted metal or plastic. It's cold...and bright. It looks like maybe small toy. The surface is smooth, but has some kind of small bumps. Maybe it's grooves or letters...because the fingers can feel it. It looks like toy, it's painted metal or plastic. That's it, stop." The item Nikolaev was describing was a green painted toy car. When presented with all six of the objects that Dr. Panov had chosen from, Nikolaev immediately identified the toy car as the selected object.

== In popular culture ==
The track "Antennaria" was used in the 2009 video game Osmos.

== See also ==
- Man with a Movie Camera (The Cinematic Orchestra album)
