= Dropsonde (album) =

Studio album by Biosphere
- Released: 30 January 2006 (CD)
- Genre: Ambient; nu jazz; downtempo
- Length: 37:30 (LP) 69:52 (CD)
- Label: Touch

Biosphere chronology
Autour de la Lune (2004)	Dropsonde (2006)	Cho Oyu 8201m – Field Recordings from Tibet (2006)

Professional ratings
Review scores
Source	Rating
Allmusic	4/5 stars

Dropsonde is an ambient album by musician Biosphere (alias Geir Jenssen). Unlike his previous output, the album has a notable jazz influence.

== Overview ==
The title refers to a dropsonde, a device designed to be dropped at altitude by parachute to collect data as the device falls to the ground (on Earth or sent to another planet.)

A Dropsonde sampler was pre-released on vinyl as a mini album on 27 September 2005 and the full album released on compact disc in January 2006 (though the track "In the Shape of a Flute" remained exclusive to the vinyl sampler).

Unlike Jenssen's previous output, there is a notable jazz influence present on this album (such as on the tracks "Birds Fly By Flapping Their Wings" and "In Triple Time"), evocative of Miles Davis's 1970s jazz fusion works. Some tracks also integrate material Jenssen recorded in late 2001 during his climbing of the 8,201 meters mount Cho Oyu in Himalaya. (The raw material itself was released some months later as Cho Oyu 8201m – Field Recordings from Tibet.)

== Track listing ==
=== LP pre-release ===
==== Side A ====
1. "Birds Fly by Flapping Their Wings" - 6:24
2. "Fall In, Fall Out" - 7:13
3. "Daphnis 26" - 6:44

==== Side B ====
1. "Altostratus" - 5:11
2. "Sherbrooke" - 5:41
3. "In the Shape of a Flute" - 6:17

=== CD release ===
1. "Dissolving Clouds" – 4:28
2. "Birds Fly by Flapping Their Wings" – 6:35
3. "Warmed by the Drift" – 6:50
4. "In Triple Time" – 5:50
5. "From a Solid to a Liquid" – 5:19
6. "Arafura" – 5:10
7. "Fall In, Fall Out" – 7:10
8. "Daphnis 26" – 6:45
9. "Altostratus" – 5:11
10. "Sherbrooke" – 5:55
11. "People Are Friends" – 10:39

== Credits ==
All tracks written and performed by Geir Jenssen. Photography by Jon Wozencroft. Mastered by Denis Blackham.

== Charts ==
Chart (2006)	Peak position
Norwegian Albums (VG-lista)	29
