= Shenzhou (album) =

Studio album by Biosphere
- Released: 3 June 2002
- Genre: Ambient; drone; experimental; minimalism; tape music
- Length: 56:30
- Label: Touch Records

Biosphere chronology
Substrata 2 (2001)	Shenzhou (2002)	Autour de la Lune (2004)

Professional ratings
Review scores
Source	Rating
Allmusic	4/5 stars
Headphone Commute	Favorable

Shenzhou is an album by ambient musician Biosphere released on 3 June 2002. The structure and sound of this album are drastically minimalistic in comparison with Geir Jenssen's previous work, a concept that would be further elaborated upon in the next album. Samples are taken from several of Claude Debussy's orchestral works, particularly La mer and Rondes de printemps (from Images pour orchestre). The album's name, "Shenzhou", aside from meaning "magical boat" (神舟) and being the name of the Chinese crewed-spaceflight vehicles, means divine vessel. However, it could also mean "the world" (神州).

== Track listing ==
1. "Shenzhou" – 5:04
2. "Spindrift" – 4:37
3. "Ancient Campfire" – 7:45
4. "Heat Leak" – 4:57
5. "Houses on the Hill" – 5:43
6. "Two Ocean Plateau" – 3:10
7. "Thermal Motion" – 4:27
8. "Path Leading to the High Grass" – 3:55
9. "Fast Atoms Escape" – 3:29
10. "Green Reflections" – 3:32
11. "Bose-Einstein Condensation" – 2:47
12. "Gravity Assist" – 7:04
