= Tuu (band) =

Tuu was an ambient group from the late 1980s to 1999. Led by Martin Franklin, the band emerged from the post acid house chill out scene of the early 1990s in the UK, blending electronica and the emerging sampling technology with traditional and invented global instrumentation.

== Personnel ==
- Martin Franklin – clay pot drums, bowl gongs, water drums, Tibetan bells, samples, and percussion
- Richard Clare – flutes and pan pipes
- Mykl O'Dempsey – synthesizers and samples
- Rebecca Lublinski – bansuri and Chinese flutes

== Discography ==
- 1993: One Thousand Years – SDV Tontrager, released by Waveform in the U.S.
- 1994: An Opening of the Earth – SDV Tontrager. Side project by Martin Franklin collaborating with sound artist Michael Northam
- 1995: Invocation – Hic Sunt Leones
- 1995: All Our Ancestors – Beyond Records (UK), Waveform (US)
- 1996: Maps Without Edges – Beyond Records (UK), City of Tribes Records (US). Side project by Martin Franklin collaborating with Eddy Sayer under the name Stillpoint.
- 1997: Mesh – Fathom/Hearts of Space Records
- 1998: Terma – Fathom/Hearts of Space Records (Collaboration with Nick Parkin)
- 1999: The Frozen Lands – 3-inch compact disc, Amplexus
- There are various compilation CD appearances that haven't been listed, notably, Planet Dog's Feed Your Head, Whirl-Y-Waves Vol #2, Excursions in Ambience, and Talvin Singh's Back to Mine.
