= Apollo Records (Belgium) =

Belgian ambient music record label

Apollo Records is an ambient-music subdivision of R&S Records of Belgium.

== Selected discography ==
- Apollo Compilation – Volume 1 – File Under Ambient
- Biosphere – Microgravity
- Aphex Twin – Selected Ambient Works 85–92
- In–Existence – Moonwater
- The Irresistible Force – The Irresistible Force
- Robert Leiner – Visions of the Past
- Biosphere – Patashnik
- The Fires of Ork – The Fires of Ork
- Locust – Weathered Well
- Jam & Spoon – Tripomatic Fairy Tales 2002
- Tournesol – Kokotsu
- Uzect Plaush – More Beautiful Human Life!
- Apollo 2 – The Divine Compilation
- Cabaret Voltaire – The Conversation
- Locust – Natural Composite
- Sketch – Reasons to Sway
- Manna – Manna
- Sun Electric – 30.7.94 Live
- Locust – Truth is Born of Arguments
- Subsurfing – Frozen Ants, illustrated by James Marsh
- Locust – Morning Light
- Sun Electric – Present
- Manna – 5:1
- Drum Island – Drum Island
- John Beltran – Moving Through Here
- David Morley – Tilted
- DJ Krush & Toshinori Kondo – Ki–Oku
- Sun Electric – Via Nostra
- Thomas Fehlmann – Good Fridge (Flowing Ninezeronineight)
- Mark Van Hoen – Playing with Time
- Kondo/Bernocchi/Laswell – Charged
- Thomas Fehlmann – OneToThree
- Afronaught – Shapin Fluid
- Dynamoe – Jump Start

== See also ==
- List of record labels
- Apollo Records
