= Man with a Movie Camera =

1929 Soviet silent documentary film

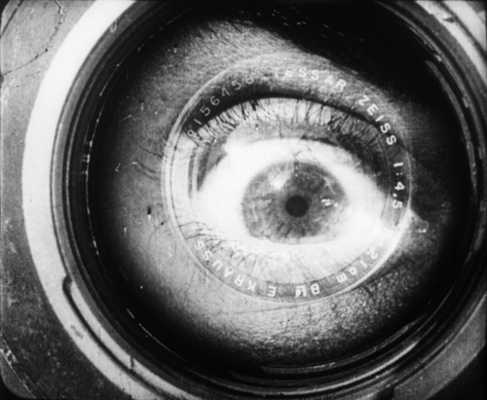
- Still from Man with a Movie Camera
- Directed by: Dziga Vertov
- Written by: Dziga Vertov
- Produced by: Star Mishkel-Eneva
- Cinematography: Mikhail Kaufman; Gleb Troyanski
- Edited by: Dziga Vertov; Yelizaveta Svilova
- Production companies: All-Ukrainian Photo Cinema Administration (VUFKU); Dovzhenko Film Studios
- Release date: 9 April 1929
- Running time: 68 minutes
- Country: Soviet Union
- Languages: Silent film No intertitles

Man with a Movie Camera (Note: Also known as A Man with a Movie Camera, The Man with the Movie Camera, The Man with a Camera, The Man with the Kinocamera, or Living Russia. See IMDB's list of alternate titles for Man with a Movie Camera.) (Note: Russian: Человек с киноаппаратом, romanized: Chelovek s kinoapparatom; Ukrainian: Людина з кіноапаратом, romanized: Lyudyna z kinoaparatom.) is a 1929 Soviet experimental silent documentary film, written and directed by Dziga Vertov. It was filmed by his brother Mikhail Kaufman (who also appears as the titular cameraman), and edited by Vertov's wife Yelizaveta Svilova.

Vertov's feature film, produced by the film studio All-Ukrainian Photo Cinema Administration (VUFKU), presents urban life in Moscow, Kiev and Odessa during the late 1920s. It has no actors. From dawn to dusk Soviet citizens are shown at work and at play, and interacting with the machinery of modern life. To the extent that it can be said to have "characters", they are the cameramen of the title, the film editor, and the modern Soviet Union they discover and present in the film.

Man with a Movie Camera is famous for the range of cinematic techniques Vertov invented, employed or developed, such as multiple exposure, fast motion, slow motion, freeze frames, match cuts, jump cuts, split screens, Dutch angles, extreme close-ups, tracking shots, reversed footage, stop motion animations and self-reflexive visuals (at one point it features a split-screen tracking shot; the sides have opposite Dutch angles).

Man with a Movie Camera was largely dismissed upon its initial release; the work's fast cutting, self-reflexivity, and emphasis on form over content were all subjects of criticism. In the British Film Institute's 2012 Sight & Sound poll, however, film critics voted it the 8th greatest film ever made, the 9th greatest in the 2022 poll, and in 2014 it was named the best documentary of all time in the same magazine. The National Oleksandr Dovzhenko Film Centre placed it in 2021 at number three of their list of the 100 best films in the history of Ukrainian cinema.

In 2015, the film received a restoration using a 35mm print of the only known complete version of the film. Restoration efforts were conducted by the EYE Film Institute in Amsterdam, with additional digital work by Lobster Films, who released the restoration on DVD and Blu-ray in France. This restored version was licensed for release on Blu-ray to Flicker Alley in North America, Eureka Entertainment in the UK, and by Divisa in Spain.

== Overview ==
The complete film

The film is divided into six separate parts, one for each film reel on which it would have originally been printed. Each part begins with a number appearing on screen and falling down flat. The film makes use of many editing techniques, such as superimposition, slow motion, fast motion, rapid cross-cutting, and montage.

The film has an unabashedly avant-garde style, and the subject matter varies greatly. The titular man with the movie camera (Mikhail Kaufman, Vertov's brother) travels to diverse locations to capture a variety of shots. He appears in artistic images such as a superimposed shot of the cameraman setting up his camera atop a second, mountainous camera, and another superimposed shot of the cameraman inside a beer glass. General images include laborers at work, sporting events, couples getting married and divorced, a woman giving birth, and a funeral procession. Much of the film is concerned with people of varying economic classes navigating urban environments. On occasion, the film's editor (Svilova) is shown working with strips of film and various pieces of editing equipment.

Despite claiming to be without actors, the film features a few staged situations. This includes some of the cameraman's actions, the scene of a woman getting dressed, and chess pieces being swept to the center of the board (a shot spliced in backwards so the pieces expand outward and stand in position). Stop-motion is used for several shots, including an unmanned camera on a tripod standing up, showing off its mechanical parts, and then walking off screen.

== Vertov's intentions ==
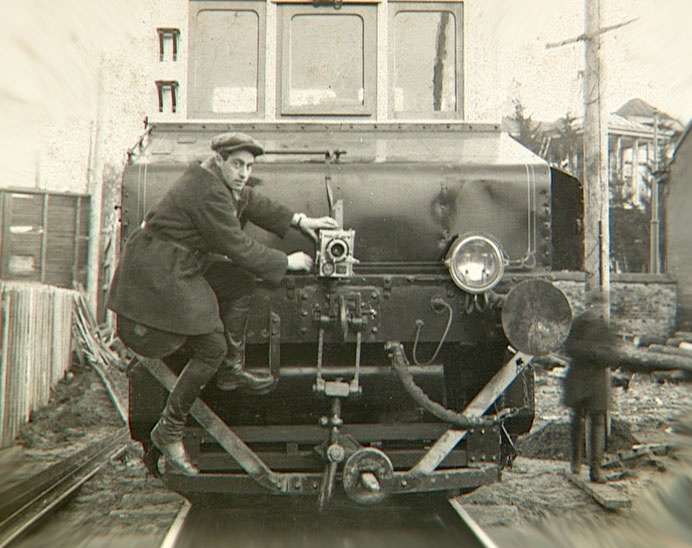
In this shot, Mikhail Kaufman acts as a cameraman risking his life in search of the best shot

Vertov was an early pioneer in documentary film-making during the late 1920s. He belonged to a movement of filmmakers known as the kinoks, or kino-oki (kino-eyes). Vertov, along with other kino artists declared it their mission to abolish all non-documentary styles of film-making, a radical approach to movie making. Most of Vertov's films were highly controversial, and the kinok movement was despised by many filmmakers.

Vertov's crowning achievement, Man with a Movie Camera, was his response to critics who rejected his previous film, A Sixth Part of the World. Critics had declared that Vertov's overuse of "intertitles" was inconsistent with the film-making style to which the "kinoks" subscribed. Working within that context, Vertov dealt with a lot of fear in anticipation of the film's release. He requested a warning to be printed in the Soviet central Communist newspaper Pravda, which spoke directly of the film's experimental, controversial nature. Vertov was worried that the film would be either destroyed or ignored by the public. Upon the official release of Man with a Movie Camera, Vertov issued a statement at the beginning of the film, which read:

A real film represents
AN EXPERIMENTATION IN THE CINEMATIC COMMUNICATION
Of visual phenomena
WITHOUT THE USE OF INTERTITLES
(a film without intertitles)
WITHOUT THE HELP OF A SCENARIO
(a film without a scenario)
WITHOUT THE HELP OF THEATRE
(a film without actors, without sets, etc.)
This new experimentation work is directed towards the creation of an authentically international absolute language of cinema on the basis of its complete separation from the language of theatre and literature.

This manifesto echoes an earlier one that Vertov wrote in 1922, in which he disavowed popular films he felt were indebted to literature and theater.

== Stylistic aspects ==
Working within a Marxist ideology, Vertov strove to create a futuristic city that would serve as a commentary on existing ideals in the Soviet world. This artificial city's purpose was to awaken the Soviet citizen through truth and to ultimately bring about understanding and action. The kino's aesthetic shone through in his portrayal of electrification, industrialization, and the achievements of workers through hard labor. This film is in keeping with modernist thoughts in how it challenges art both conceptually and in practice, incorporating industrial life and technology as featured subjects of the film and implementing new editing techniques. In utilizing these techniques, the artist creates a modern interpretation of city life.

Some have mistakenly stated that many visual ideas, such as the quick editing, the close-ups of machinery, the store window displays, even the shots of a typewriter keyboard are borrowed from Walter Ruttmann's Berlin: Symphony of a Great City (1927), which predates Man with a Movie Camera by two years, but as Vertov wrote to the German press in 1929, these techniques and images had been developed and employed by him in his Kino-Pravda newsreels and documentaries during the previous ten years, all of which predate Berlin. Vertov's pioneering cinematic concepts actually inspired other abstract films by Ruttmann and others, including writer, translator, filmmaker and critic Liu Na'ou (1905–1940), whose The Man Who Has a Camera (1933) pays explicit homage to Vertov's Man with a Movie Camera.

Man with a Movie Camera's usage of double exposure and seemingly "hidden" cameras made the movie come across as a surreal montage rather than a linear motion picture. Many of the scenes in the film contain people, who change size or appear underneath other objects (double exposure). Because of these aspects, the movie is fast-moving. The sequences and close-ups capture emotional qualities that could not be fully portrayed through the use of words. The film's lack of "actors" and "sets" makes for a unique view of the everyday world; one that, according to a title card, is directed toward the creation of a new cinematic language that is "[separated] from the language of theatre and literature".

== Production ==
It was filmed over a period of about three years. Four cities—Moscow, Kiev, Kharkov and Odessa—were the shooting locations.

== Reception ==
=== Initial ===
Man with a Movie Camera was not always a highly regarded work. The film was criticized for both the stagings and the stark experimentation, possibly as a result of its director's frequent assailing of fiction film as a new "opiate of the masses".

Vertov's Soviet contemporaries criticized its focus on form over content, with Sergei Eisenstein even deriding the film as "pointless camera hooliganism". The work was largely dismissed in the West as well. Documentary filmmaker Paul Rotha said that in Britain, Vertov was "regarded really as rather a joke, you know. All this cutting, and one camera photographing another camera – it was all trickery, and we didn't take it seriously." The pace of the film's editing – more than four times faster than a typical 1929 feature, with approximately 1,775 separate shots – also perturbed some viewers, including The New York Times' reviewer Mordaunt Hall: "The producer, Dziga Vertov, does not take into consideration the fact that the human eye fixes for a certain space of time that which holds the attention."

=== Re-evaluation ===
Man with a Movie Camera is now regarded by many as one of the greatest films ever made, ranking 9th in the 2022 Sight & Sound poll of the world's best films. In 2009, Roger Ebert wrote: "It made explicit and poetic the astonishing gift the cinema made possible, of arranging what we see, ordering it, imposing a rhythm and language on it, and transcending it." In the early 1970s, the Anthology Film Archives selected the film for its collection of essential cinema. The National Oleksandr Dovzhenko Film Centre placed it in 2021 at number three of their list of the 100 best films in the history of Ukrainian cinema.

On the review aggregator website Rotten Tomatoes, 98% of 40 critics' reviews are positive, with an average rating of 9.10/10. The website's consensus reads: "Groundbreaking in its exploration of the medium, Man with a Movie Camera is proof that cinema in and of itself can be a source of grand entertainment and sociological value." Metacritic, which uses a weighted average, assigned the film a score of 96 out of 100, based on 16 critics, indicating "universal acclaim".

== Analysis ==
Man with a Movie Camera has been interpreted as an optimistic work. Jonathan Romney called it "an exuberant manifesto that celebrates the infinite possibilities of what cinema can be". Peter Bradshaw of The Guardian wrote that the work "is visibly excited about the new medium's possibility, dense with ideas, packed with energy: it echoes Un Chien Andalou, anticipates Vigo's À propos de Nice and the New Wave generally, and even Riefenstahl's Olympia".

== Soundtracks ==
The film was originally released as a silent feature in April 1929, accompanied by a specific musical framework approved by Sovkino for its premiere. While this original arrangement was subsequently lost for decades, the film has since been performed and released a number of times with various alternative soundtracks, as well as recent musicological reconstructions of its premier score:

- 1983 – A new composition was performed by Un Drame Musical Instantané, based on Vertov's writings, among which was his Ear Laboratory. Electronic sounds, ambiences, voices were mixed to the 15-piece orchestra. An LP was issued in 1984 on Grrr Records.
- 1993 – French composer Pierre Henry, known as a pioneer of musique concrète, created a soundtrack for the film.
- 1995 – A new composition was performed by the Alloy Orchestra of Cambridge, Massachusetts, based on notes left by Vertov. It incorporates sound effects such as sirens, babies crying, crowd noise, etc. Readily available on several different DVD versions.
- 1996 – Norwegian composer Geir Jenssen (aka Biosphere) was commissioned by the Tromsø International Film Festival to write a new soundtrack for the movie, using the director's written instructions for the original accompanying piano player. Jenssen wrote half of the soundtrack, turning the other half to Per Martinsen (aka Mental Overdrive). It was used for the Norwegian version Mannen med filmkameraet at the 1996 TIFF. This version of the film has not been re-released elsewhere, but the soundtrack was released separately with Jenssen's contributions on Substrata 2 in 2001 and Martinsen's on an album of the same name in 2012.
- 1999 – In the Nursery band made a version, for the Bradford International Film Festival. Currently available on some DVD versions, often paired with the Alloy Orchestra score as an alternate soundtrack.
- 2001 – Steve Jansen and Claudio Chianura recorded a live soundtrack for a showing of the film at the Palazzina Liberty, in Milan on 11 December 1999. This was subsequently released on CD as the album Kinoapparatom in 2001.
- 2002 – A version was released with a soundtrack composed by Jason Swinscoe and performed by the British jazz and electronic outfit The Cinematic Orchestra (see Man with a Movie Camera (The Cinematic Orchestra album)). Originally made for the Porto 2000 Film Festival. It was also released on DVD in limited numbers by Ninja Tune.
- 2002 – A score for the film by Michael Nyman was premiered performed by the Michael Nyman Band on 17 May 2002 at London's Royal Festival Hall. A British Film Institute DVD of the film was released with Nyman's score. This score is readily available on several different DVD editions. It has not been issued on CD, but some of the score is reworked from material Nyman wrote for the Sega Saturn video game Enemy Zero, which had a limited CD release, and Nyman performs a brief excerpt "Odessa Beach" on his album The Piano Sings.
- June 2003 – American multi-theremin ensemble The Lothars performed a semi-improvised soundtrack accompanying a screening of the film at the Coolidge Corner Theatre in Brookline, Massachusetts. They repeated their performance three years later, in December 2006 at the Galapagos Art Space in Brooklyn, New York.
- 2006 – Absolut Medien, Berlin, released a DVD with the 3 soundtracks from Michael Nyman, In the nursery, and a new soundtrack from Werner Cee.
- November 2007 – France based group Art Zoyd presented a scenic version of the film with an additional video by artist Cecile Babiole. A studio recording of the soundtrack was released on CD in 2012.
- 2008 – Norwegian electronic jazz trio Halt the Flux performed their interpretation of the soundtrack at the Bergen International Film Festival.
- October 2008 – London based Cinematic Orchestra undertook a show featuring a screening of Vertov's film, which preceded the re-issue of the Man With A Movie Camera DVD, in November.
- 30 November 2008 – American Tricks of the Light Orchestra accompanied a screening of the film on Sunday at Brainwash Cafe in San Francisco.
- July 2009 – Mexican composer Alex Otaola performed a new soundtrack live at Mexico's National Cinematheque, aided by the "Ensamble de Cámara/Acción".
- 2009 – The American Voxare String Quartet performed music by Soviet Modernist composers to accompany a screening of the film.
- August 2010 – Irish instrumental post-rock band 3epkano accompanied a screening of the film with an original live soundtrack in Fitzwilliam Square in Dublin
- July 2010 – Ukrainian guitarist and composer Vitaliy Tkachuk performed his own soundtrack for the film, with his quartet, at a Ukrainian silent cinema festival "Mute Nights" in Odesa, the city where this movie was made.
- 20 May 2011 – The French pianist Yann Le Long, the violoncellist Philippe Cusson and the percussionist Stéphane Grimalt performed, for the first time, the soundtrack written by Le Long for the film at the Centre Culturel du Vieux Couvent, Muzillac, France.
- March 2014 – Sarodist, beat maker, and multi-instrumentalist composer James Whetzel performed live a 51-piece new all-original soundtrack to Man with a Movie Camera at SIFF Cinema Uptown in Seattle, WA, USA. Soundtrack features sarod, electric sarod, analog synthesizers, accordion, mandolin, bass, guitar, dhol, dholak, darbouka, bendir, rumba box, electronic drums, and 41 other pieces of percussion. Whetzel successfully completed a Kickstarter project for the soundtrack in July.
- 2014 – Spanish band Caspervek Trio premiered a new soundtrack for the film at La Galería Jazz Club, Vigo, with further performances in Gijón, Ourense and Sigulda (Latvia).
- September 2014 – Swedish indie rock band bob hund premiered a new soundtrack at Cinemateket in Stockholm, with subsequent performances in Helsinki, Luleå, Gothenburg and Malmö.
- 2016 – Donald Sosin, John Davis and others performed their collaborative score at the Museum of the Moving Image, Astoria, New York.
- 2022 – SilentFilmDJ D'dread performed a live DJ Set to a AI colored version of the film for at.tension Festival, Lärz, Germany. The film with the DJ Soundtrack is released via YouTube
- 2022 – Austin based indie chamber music group Montopolis is currently touring performing a new live score to accompany the film.
- 2024 – Los Angeles composer, Alexander Tovar, conducted a sold out performance at the Cats Crawl in East Hollywood with the Orchid Quartet Collective with Michael Sobie scored for piano quintet.
- 2024 – A musicological reconstruction of the film's original April 1929 Moscow premiere score was completed by researcher Richard Bossons and composer Leo Geyer, and premiered live by the Kammerata Luxembourg in November 2024. The project utilized Dziga Vertov's handwritten archive notes and a typed "Musical Conspectus" (Музыкальный конспект) discovered by Yuri Tsivian in 1994. The 398-page score comprises late 19th and early 20th-century opera, ballet, and light music by composers such as Giulio de Micheli, Édouard Trémisot, and Isaac Snoek, arranged to fit the instrumentation of a period cinema orchestra. The soundtrack was subsequently recorded by the London-based Constella Orchestra and released digitally in January 2026.
- 14 March 2026 – Melbourne indie band Underground Lovers performed at two showings with a live score at The Capitol, Melbourne.
- 23 July 2026 – St Antonin Noble Val (France) band – The Terrace Collective (ten-piece) performed a live accompaniment at the Querlys Cinema St Antonin.

== See also ==
- List of films considered the best
