= Higher Intelligence Agency =

British electronic musician

- Origin: Birmingham, UK
- Genres: Electronic; IDM; techno; ambient; ambient dub
- Years active: 1992–present
- Members: Robert (Bobby) Bird

Higher Intelligence Agency (HIA) is the main electronic music project of Birmingham, UK-based Robert (Bobby) Bird. The project was featured on Warp's Artificial Intelligence II compilation and went on to release the critically acclaimed albums Colourform (1993) and Freefloater (1995).

== Biography ==
HIA was formed by Bird in 1992 around the same time as he and a small group of collaborators began an experimental electronic music club night called Oscillate. Bird brought his drum machines and keyboards to the club night and improvised live in-between playing records. After coming across a local label just starting up, Beyond Records, Bird produced Ketamine Entity for Ambient Dub Volume 1 followed by ‘Speedlearn' and ‘Solid Motion for an EP entitled Speedlearn. These tracks were written by Bird together with Steve Savale, an early contributor.

HIA’s debut album Colourform (1993) was written and produced by Bird in his bedroom studio in Moseley, with additional contributions by members of the Oscillate collectiv: Savale, Dave Wheels & Fosit Forsythe. Colourform has been described as "one of the British Ambient scene’s landmark releases" and HIA went on to become regulars on the emerging live electronic music scene, playing at The Ambient Weekend Melkweg Amsterdam ('93) Interference Festival Tresor Club Berlin, Tripping on Sunshine Festival Copenhagen, The Brixton Academy New Year's Megadog ('94), and the first ever Dance Music stage at Glastonbury ('95). With Bird at the Helm, assisted by Dave Wheels, HIA played lengthy sets that ‘unfolded oscillated calm into boundless shifting voyages, heading out to beat frenzy and beyond, into the language of dreams’

Referring in Volume Magazine to the dub element inherent in HIA material at this time Bird said "I grew up with it ..I was in Handsworth a lot when I was young - the parties had dub all the time and I wanted to be a musician years before I left school. But I never dreamed I’d be programming electronic music "

In 1994 HIA appeared on Warp Records' Artificial Intelligence II compilation with the track Selenite. Colour Reform, an EP of remixes of tracks from Colourform, by Autechre, The Irresistible Force (aka Mix Master Morris), A Positive Life and Pentatonic, was also released, becoming NME Vibes Single of the week.

A second album Freefloater followed in 1995 released, written and produced by Bird, with additional contributions on individual tracks by Dave Wheels, Fosit Forsythe and Stef Pierlejewski. Freefloater is considered to be HIA’s definitive album so far, and an excellent example of ambient electro. Writer Hari Kunzru described it as ’music in which the space in between is just as important as the notes. In a perfect world this is what NASA would play to space shuttle crews in orbit’

In 1995 Bird and Biosphere’s Geir Jenssen performed three concerts together on top of a mountain above Geir's home town of Tromso in Norway, using location recordings of the surrounding area as source material. Recordings from these concerts were subsequently released as Biosphere / Higher Intelliengece Agency album Polar Sequences (1996). The album was critically acclaimed and voted as one of the top 20 all time ambient releases by fans at Hyperreal.org

A return invitation in 1997 for Geir to come to Birmingham and play a collaborative concert on the 12th floor of the Rotunda, using location recordings of Birmingham resulted in the HIA/Biosphere album Birmingham Frequencies released on Bird's Headphone label in 2000.

Bird also made two collaborative albums with German ambient music producer Pete Namlook, SHADO and SHADO 11, and an album Higher Intelligence Agency Meets Deep Space Network with David Moufang, Jonas Grossman and Dave Wheels.

In recent years Bird has continued to play occasional live Higher Intelligence Agency concerts including at Detroit Electronic Music Festival, Ambient Festival Gorlice Poland, Boom Festival Portugal, O.Z.O.R.A. Hungary, and UK festivals Beat-Herder and Lunar, and more recently played the "Beyond the Tracks" festival in East Side City Park, Birmingham.

Occasional remixes and tracks continue to appear, including 'Sky One' written for a Pete Namlook tribute compilation.

In 2020, HIA released an EP of new material 'Discatron' was released and in 2021 an LP 'Song of the Machine'.

Aside from HIA, Bird has also created multi-speaker sound installations for festivals, galleries, woodland spaces and performances and played guitar for The Beat feat Ranking Roger.

== Discography ==
Year	Title	Label	Notes
1993	Colourform	Beyond / Waveform	Solo album
1995	Freefloater	Beyond / Waveform	Solo album
1996	Polar Sequences	Beyond	with Biosphere (live)
1996	Deep Space Network Meets Higher Intelligence Agency	Source Records	with Deep Space Network
1997	S.H.A.D.O.	FAX +49-69/450464	with Pete Namlook
1999	S.H.A.D.O. 2	FAX +49-69/450464	with Pete Namlook
1999	Birmingham Frequencies	Headphone	with Biosphere (live)
2002	The Fire This Time	Hidden Art	Compilation
2022	Song of the Machine		Field recordings

== See also ==
- List of ambient music artists
