= Biosphere (musician) =

Norwegian electronic musician

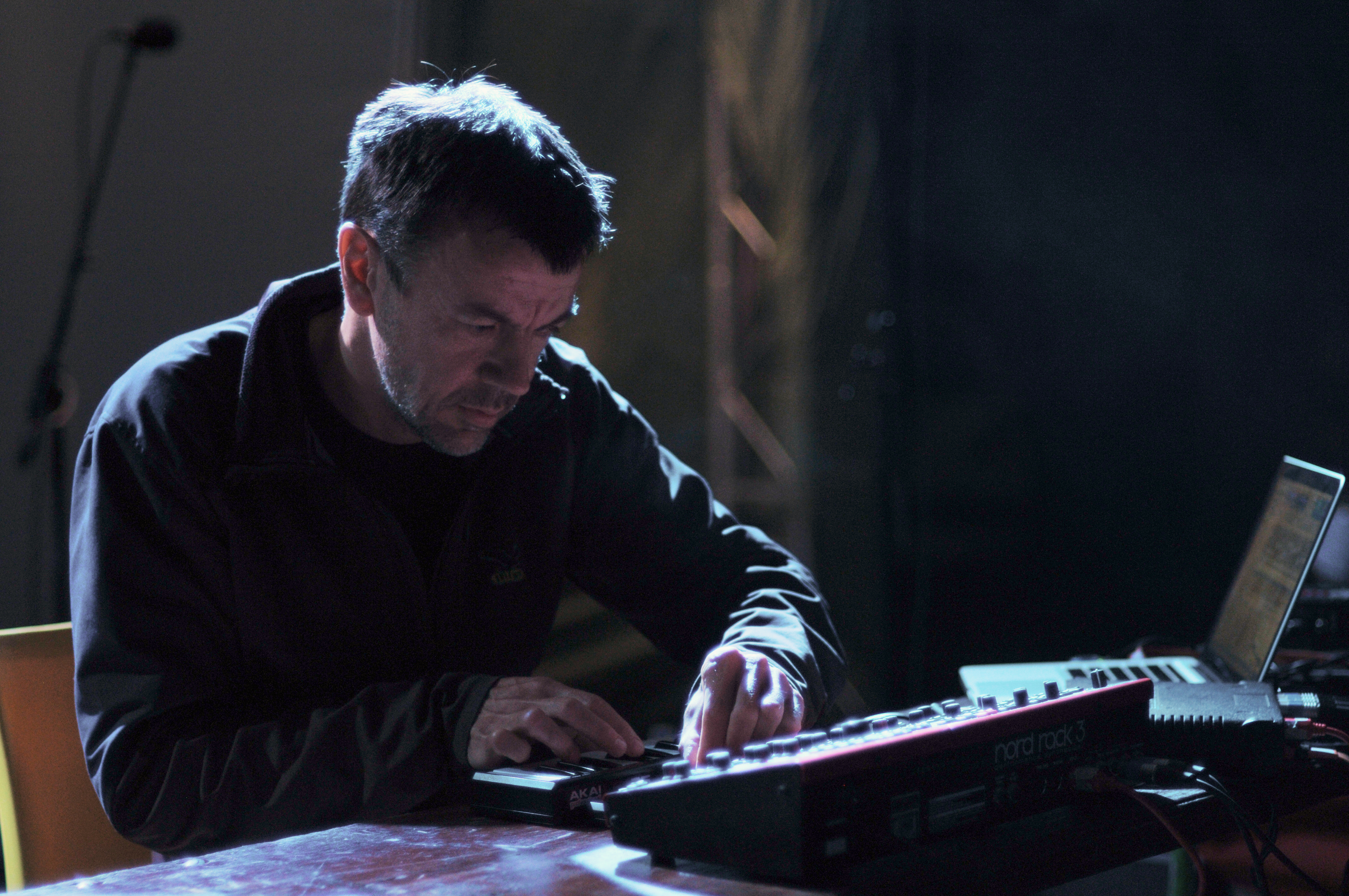
- Geir Jenssen performing in 2011

Background information
- Also known as: Bleep, Cosmic Explorer, E-Man
- Born: Geir Aule Jenssen; 30 May 1962 (age 64)
- Origin: Tromsø, Norway
- Genres: Electronic; ambient; ambient house; IDM; drone; downtempo; experimental; field recordings
- Occupation: Producer
- Instruments: Electronic keyboard, synthesizer
- Years active: 1983–present
- Labels: Beatservice Records; Touch; Biophon Records; Apollo; Origo Sound; SSR Records; Rune Grammofon; Smalltown Supersound; AD 93
- Website: www.biosphere.no

Geir Aule Jenssen (born 30 May 1962) is a Norwegian electronic musician and composer who records as Biosphere. A resident of Tromsø within the Arctic Circle, Jenssen is well known for ambient and ambient house pieces, often inspired by Arctic or mountain settings, and his use of loops and peculiar samples from science fiction and natural sources. His 1997 album Substrata was voted by the users of the Hyperreal.org website in 2001 as the best all-time classic ambient album. He has also composed several film scores.

== History ==
=== Prior to Biosphere (1962–1991) ===
Jenssen was born on 30 May 1962 in Tromsø, a city within the Arctic Circle in the northernmost portion of Norway. He was inspired by the music of artists such as New Order, Depeche Mode, Wire, and Brian Eno, which he described as "like discovering a new universe—a universe which I wanted to be a part of". Other formative influences included Orchestral Manoeuvres in the Dark, Throbbing Gristle and Cabaret Voltaire. In 1983, he bought his first synthesizer and composed his first piece of music, taking inspiration from his archaeological studies, later stating "Studying the Ice Age and Stone Age has definitely influenced my music." In 1984 Jenssen issued his first album, "E-Man", released on cassette only on the Norwegian indie label Likvider and credited to E-man.

In 1985, Jenssen was part of the newly created Norwegian moody synth trio Bel Canto with Nils Johansen and singer Anneli Drecker. The band signed with Belgian label Crammed Discs and to Nettwerk in North America, and relocated to Brussels. Jenssen, however, soon returned to Tromsø, collaborating with the other band members by post, and continuing with his solo work. Bel Canto released two albums while Jenssen was a member, White-Out Conditions and Birds of Passage. In 1990, he left the band in order to pursue a different music style altogether, and began using a sampler.

Throughout the late 1980s, Jenssen used the moniker Bleep, under which he produced various 12" records, now releasing records via the Crammed Discs subsidiary SSR. His early influences were from acid house and New Beat music. Released in 1990, The North Pole by Submarine was the only album recorded as Bleep. Further singles followed in 1990 and 1991 before Jenssen abandoned the Bleep moniker and again changed musical direction.

=== As Biosphere (1991–present) ===
Following the release of The North Pole by Submarine, Jenssen began releasing his music as Biosphere on obscure Norwegian compilation albums. His first Biosphere releases were the 12-inch single "The Fairy Tale" and the album Microgravity, both of which were rejected by SSR as unmarketable. Microgravity was released in 1991 on the Norwegian label Origo Sound, and saw wider release via the R&S Records subsidiary Apollo in 1992, to much critical acclaim.

In 1992, Jenssen contributed "I'll Strangle You" to Hector Zazou's Sahara Blue project. In 1993, Jenssen collaborated with German ambient musician Pete Namlook on The Fires of Ork.

In 1994, the second Biosphere album, Patashnik was released, through which Jenssen continued to explore his ambient-house stylings to an even greater extent, employing the theme of a lost cosmonaut drifting aimlessly through space. Patashnik contained the first hints of the reduction in beat-driven song structure that would mark later Biosphere releases. Unlike the first album, Patashnik was quickly picked up by a comparatively large international audience, which brought Biosphere greater recognition. Jenssen also recorded as Cosmic Explorer, scoring a hit in Belgium with the EP The Hubble.

In 1995, Levi Strauss & Co. was searching for a new angle to add to their television advertisement campaign (which up to that point had never featured electronic music), and they decided to use the uptempo track "Novelty Waves" from Patashnik. Shortly thereafter, "Novelty Waves" was released as a single (featuring remixes by various other artists), and managed to chart in several countries, reaching No. 51 in the UK singles chart. Although Jenssen never regretted his approval for use of the track, he also never sought this kind of fame and subsequently turned down various requests by his record company and peers to collaborate with well-known techno and drum 'n bass artists, or to create a follow-up album in the same style. During that same year, Biosphere contributed the song "The Seal and the Hydrophone" exclusively to Apollo 2 – The Divine Compilation released by Apollo Records.

Substrata (1997) is a purely atmospheric ambient Biosphere album, released on All Saints Records. Substrata, which marked Jenssen's embarkation towards an intensely minimal style, is not only often considered to be Jenssen's best work to date, but is also seen as one of the all-time classic ambient albums. Substrata contains samples from the American TV show Twin Peaks directed by David Lynch and a soundtrack by Angelo Badalamenti.

In 2000, Jenssen released Cirque on his new home Touch, an ambient album driven by muffled beats, samples, and minimal atmospherics. Though Cirque briefly revisited territory covered by earlier Biosphere releases, the rhythm section throughout the album remains an element of the background, unlike Jenssen's first two Biosphere releases, wherein the drums occupied a dominating proportion of the foreground.

In 2002, he released Shenzhou, the fifth full-length album under the name Biosphere. This album was a more abstract work, comparable to Aphex Twin's 1994 album Selected Ambient Works Volume II. The material on the album draws from elongated, pitch-shifted loops taken from Debussy's La Mer, and Jeux.

Released in 2004, Autour de la Lune stands as the most minimal and austere Biosphere album to date. The drones employed on this album are comparable to Coil's 1998 album Time Machines in their timbre and slow rate of change. The bulk of this work was originally commissioned and broadcast in September 2003 by Radio France Culture for a musical evocation of Jules Verne.

In 2006, Jenssen released Dropsonde, a half beatless, half rhythmic album composed of jazz rhythms evocative of Miles Davis' 1970s jazz fusion works. A partial vinyl sampler was released a few months earlier in 2005.

In 2009, Biosphere issued Wireless: Live at the Arnolfini, Bristol, his first live album, containing new tracks such as "Pneuma" and "Pneuma II".

Jenssen has scored a number of films, including Eternal Stars (1993) and Insomnia (1997). He collaborated with German ambient composer Pete Namlook on Fires of Ork, and has also worked with Jah Wobble's Invaders of the Heart and with Bobby Bird of Higher Intelligence Agency. In 2010, two soundtracks were announced on Biosphere's website, for German film Im Schatten and Norwegian Nokas.

On 27 June 2011, Geir Jenssen released the album N-Plants, inspired by nuclear energy and nuclear plants in Japan.

In 2016, Jenssen released Departed Glories as Biosphere. The thematic focus of the album draws inspiration from the defence of Kraków from Nazi invasion during the Second World War. Jenssen conceived of the album while living in the city.

On 5 February 2021, Jenssen released the electronic-classical album Angel's Flight which features twelve tracks based on Beethoven's String Quartet No. 14.

In January 2022, Jenssen released Shortwave Memories as Biosphere. The album marked a sonic departure from Jenssen's previous work – using manually-programmed analogue synthesizers from the late 70s and early 80s to create a more vintage sound.

On 14 October 2022, Jenssen released Substrata (Alternative Versions) on Biophon Records, featuring ten alternative versions picked from the Substrata recording sessions that took place between 1995 and 1996.

On June 30, 2025, Jenssen released The Way Of Time on AD 93. According to the artist's Bandcamp, this album takes loose inspiration from Elizabeth Madox Roberts’ novel The Time Of Man, sampling Joan Lorring’s voice from the 1951 radio play adaptation of the novel.

== Live ==
Biosphere regularly performs live during electronic music festivals and in clubs throughout Europe and various other locales around the world. Live performances usually consist of Jenssen performing improvisations or variations on newer tracks on a laptop while video art is projected behind him; for example, full-screen video art was projected in his Picturehouse cinema tour in April 2006. Although these performances are rarely tied specifically to a recent album release, the uptempo material from the Bleep and Microgravity/Patashnik era is occasionally featured in Biosphere performances.

In May 2004, Biosphere's first American performance took place in Detroit.

In 2008 Jenssen announced a year-long break from touring due to his reported hatred of "airports, security checks, unhealthy food, air conditioning, hotels, etc." However, he resumed concert activity in 2009 and 2011.

== Other interests ==
Jenssen is also an active climber and mountaineer. This hobby is an inspiration on his work, as well as a source of natural sound samples. His highest feat was in 2001, climbing the Cho Oyu (Himalaya, 8201 meters) without oxygen; in 2006, he thus released Cho Oyu 8201m – Field Recordings from Tibet (as Geir Jenssen).

== Discography ==
=== Album as E-Man ===
- E-Man (1984)

=== Album as Bleep ===
- The North Pole by Submarine (1990)

=== Albums as Biosphere ===
- Microgravity (1991)
- Patashnik (1994)
- Substrata (1997)
- Cirque (2000)
- Substrata^{2} (2-CD reissue of Substrata with Man with a Movie Camera, Touch, 2001)
- Shenzhou (Touch, 2002)
- Autour de la Lune (Touch, 2004)
- Dropsonde (Touch, 2006)
- Wireless: Live at the Arnolfini, Bristol (Touch, 2009)
- N-Plants (Touch, 2011)
- L'incoronazione di Poppea (2012)
- Patashnik 2 (recorded 1992–1994, 2014)
- Das Subharchord (EP, 2014)
- Departed Glories (2016)
- Black Mesa (EP, 2017)
- The Petrified Forest (2017)
- The Hilvarenbeek Recordings (2018)
- The Senja Recordings (2019)
- Angel's Flight (2021)
- Shortwave Memories (2022)
- Substrata [Alternative Versions] (2022)
- Inland Delta (2023)
- The Way Of Time (2025)

=== Soundtracks and field recordings ===
- Eternal Stars (1993 film soundtrack)
- Man with a Movie Camera (1996 festival soundtrack, released on Substrata^{2}, 2001)
- Insomnia (1997)
- Cho Oyu 8201m – Field Recordings from Tibet (as Geir Jenssen, Ash, 2006)
- Nokas (as Geir Jenssen, 2010)
- Kill by Inches (2012, for the 1999 movie Kill by Inches)
- Stromboli – field recording from the Stromboli crater edge (EP, Touch, 2013)
- Sound Installations (2000-2009) (2015)
- The Good Nurse (film score, 2022)

=== Collaborations ===
(Usually as "Geir Jenssen" instead of "Biosphere")

- Bel Canto – White-Out Conditions (1987)
- Bel Canto – Birds of Passage (1989)
- with Pete Namlook – Fires of Ork (1993)
- with Higher Intelligence Agency – Polar Sequences (live, 1996)
- with Deathprod, remixes of Arne Nordheim – Nordheim Transformed (1998)
- Biosystems: The Biosphere Remixes (Compilation with remixes by others, 1999)
- with Higher Intelligence Agency – Birmingham Frequencies (live, 2000)
- with Pete Namlook – Fires of Ork II (2000)
- with Deathprod – Stator (Touch, 2015)

== See also ==
- List of ambient music artists

Awards
Preceded by Lindstrøm and Christabelle	Recipient of the Elektronika/Dance Spellemannprisen; 2011	Succeeded by Lindstrøm
