= Substrata 2 =

Studio album by Biosphere
- Released: 6 June 2001
- Genre: Ambient
- Length: 112:00
- Label: Touch Records

Biosphere chronology
Cirque (2000)	Substrata 2 (2001)	Man with a Movie Camera (2001)

Professional ratings
Review scores
Source	Rating
Allmusic	4/5 stars

Substrata 2, also written as Substrata², is a double album by ambient musician Biosphere which was released on 6 June 2001.

The first disc is a remastered version of Substrata, and the second disc is a soundtrack for Dziga Vertov's 1929 film Man with a Movie Camera, commissioned by the Tromsø International Film Festival in 1996, plus two bonus tracks from the Japanese version of Substrata (the last two tracks).

The cover image is a photograph of Taormina railway station, Sicily.

== Track listing ==
=== Disc one ===
1. "As the Sun Kissed the Horizon" – 1:47
2. "Poa Alpina" – 4:11
3. "Chukhung" – 7:34
4. "The Things I Tell You" – 6:28
5. "Times When I Know You'll Be Sad" – 3:44
6. "Hyperborea" – 5:45
7. "Kobresia" – 7:12
8. "Antennaria" – 5:04
9. "Uva-Ursi" – 3:01
10. "Sphere of No-Form" – 5:47
11. "Silene" – 7:53

=== Disc two ===
1. "Prologue" – 0:19
2. "The Silent Orchestra" – 7:52
3. "City Wakes Up" – 5:58
4. "Freeze-Frames" – 6:46
5. "Manicure" – 4:43
6. "The Club" – 1:57
7. "Ballerina" – 7:50
8. "The Eye of the Cyclone" – 7:22
9. "Endurium" – 10:47
