= Origo Sound =

Norwegian independent record label

- Founded: 1990
- Founder: Harald Lervik
- Distributors: Cdbaby (digital); Planet Origo (retail)
- Genre: Ambient; Electronica; Industrial; Electronic music; Downtempo
- Country of origin: Norway
- Location: Norway
- Official website: www.myspace.com/origosound

Origo Sound is a Norwegian independent record label formed in 1990 in Norway by Harald Lervik. The initiative to start the label was taken after Tormod Opedal, an employee in Lervik's software company, in 1989 had decided to close his own label Cicada which had released two albums by the Norwegian composer Erik Wøllo. Wøllo had a new album ready to be released, and Origo Sound was formed the year after, with two albums launched in the autumn 1990, of which one was the new Wøllo album

Origo Sound's major successes were the two albums by Biosphere, Microgravity and Patashnik. Hailed by Norwegian and international press for setting the standard for what was to become known as ambient techno, the albums were followed by two more albums on the label, Substrata and the movie soundtrack Insomnia.

Up until 2007, all but one of the albums released were by Norwegian bands and artists. The one exception was the Finnish duo Dystopia's album The Second Dawn in 1998, but Harald Lervik says this was purely coincidental. In 2010, the label released its first CD of original music since 2004.

Over the years, Origo Sound has released albums in a variety of styles, all founded in various electronic music subgenres. The first few years were dominated by a mix of styles ranging from new-age music to ethnic and techno. The mid 1990s saw some techno influenced albums, while in the recent past the label has moved in the direction of ambient and experimental music. The melodic approach is also covered in the catalogue.

In 2007, Origo Sound was merged into Planet Origo, an Estonian company owned by Norwegian investors, including Harald Lervik. In October that year, the label released its first CD since 2004, the sampler Planet Origo, as a warm-up to future releases. In 2013, Origo Sound was re-established as an independent, Norwegian record label.

== Discography ==
This list is organized by release year. Titles are full-length albums unless otherwise mentioned.

Year	Artist	Title	Comment
1990	Erik Wøllo	Images of Light	
1990	Green Isac	Strings and pottery	
1991	Karsten Brustad	Intarsia	
1991	Biosphere	Microgravity	
1991	Biosphere	The fairy tale	12" vinyl single
1991	Langsomt Mot Nord	Hildring	
1992	Green Isac	Happy endings	
1992	Erik Wøllo	Solstice	
1994	Biosphere	Patashnik	
1994	Karsten Brustad	Cape West	
1994	Neural Network	Brain-state-in-a-box	
1994	Sverre Knut Johansen	Distant Shore	
1995	Eyeman Reel	Bird Colony	
1995	Neural Network	Modernité	
1995	Erik Wøllo	Fossegrimen	Book + CD, joint release with Cappelen
1995	Biosphere	Novelty waves	CD single
1995	Eyeman Reel	Cyber Delhi	CD single
1997	Current	Enter the Dream	
1997	Circular	Nanotopia	
1997	Biosphere	Insomnia	
1997	Biosphere	Substrata	
1997	Exile	Dimension D	Exile = Erik Wøllo
1997	Various artists	Future Proof	Label sampler/compilation
1998	Dystopia	The second dawn	
1999	Sverre Knut Johansen	The source of energy	
2001	Current	Musik	
2002	Living Dreamtime	Exploring the Water Element	
2003	Current	Communion	
2003	Current	Ghost trip	CD single
2004	Circular	Glass Darkly	
2007	Various artists	Planet Origo	Label sampler/compilation
2010	Nemesis	Gigaherz	
2012	Sverre Knut Johansen	Planets	
2013	SynthX	Noxia	The label's first ever 2CD
2013	Pertti Grönholm	Winterplanet	
2013	Super Fata	Structural Tendency	

== See also ==
- Electronic music
- Progressive electronic music
- Computer music
- Dance music
- Electronic art music
- Ishkur's Guide to Electronic Music
- Synthesizer
- Electronic dance music
