= Áillohaš Music Award =

Annual Sámi music award

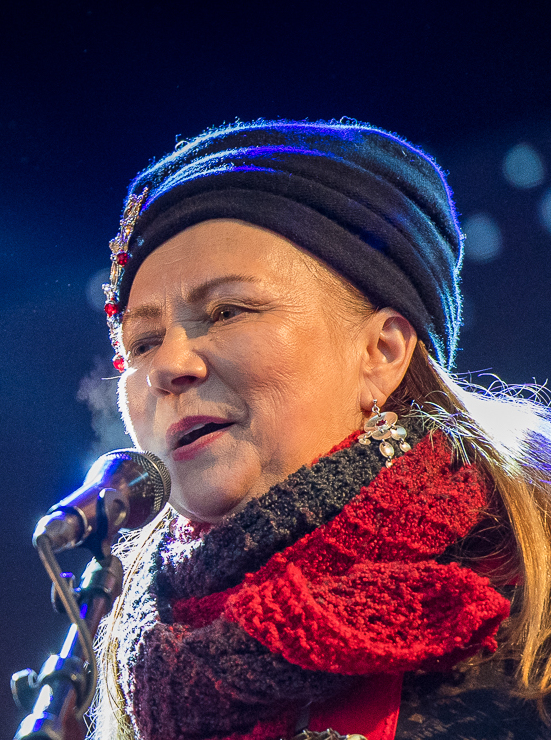
Mari Boine in 2018

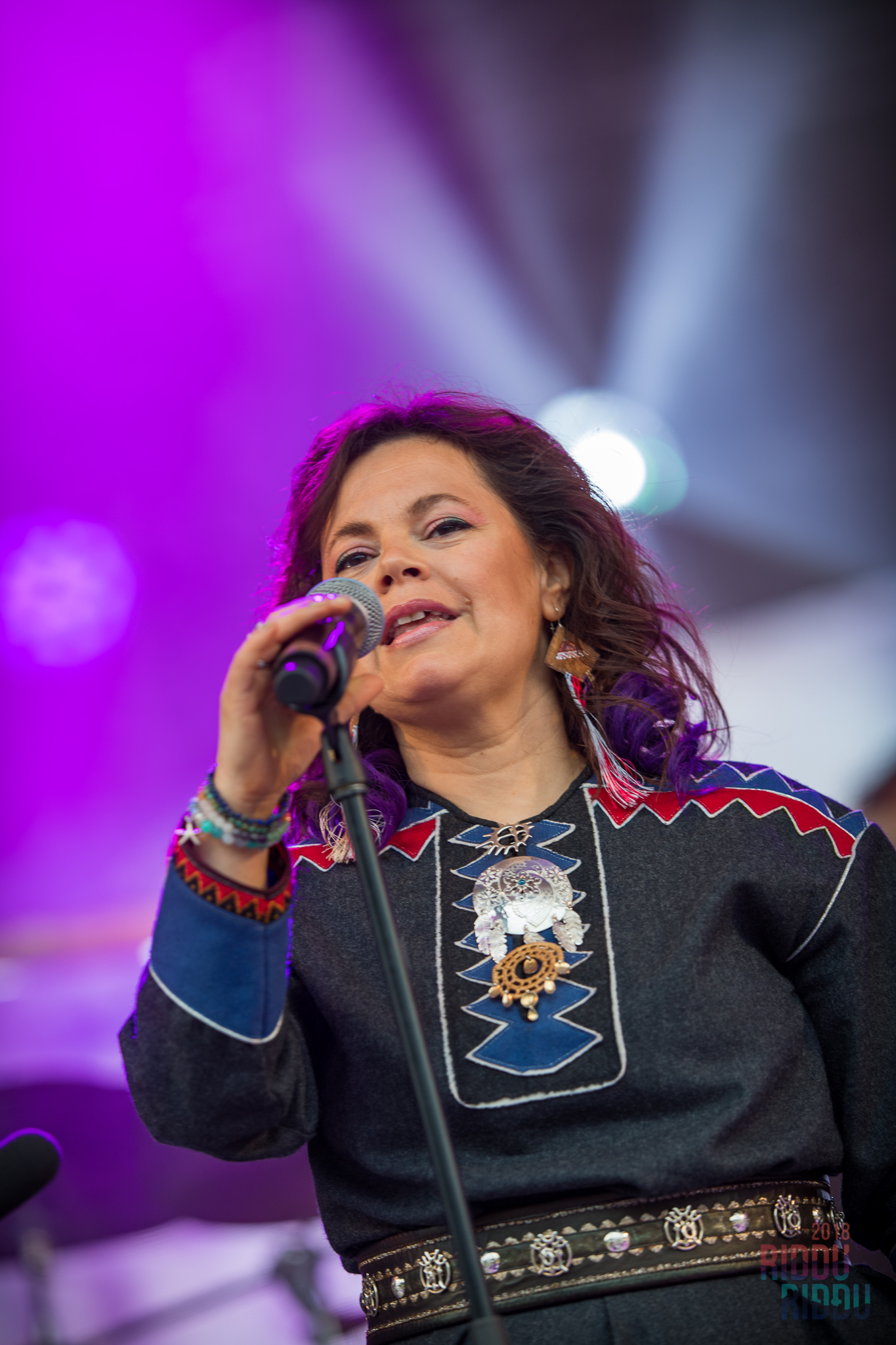
Ulla Pirttijärvi-Länsman in 2018

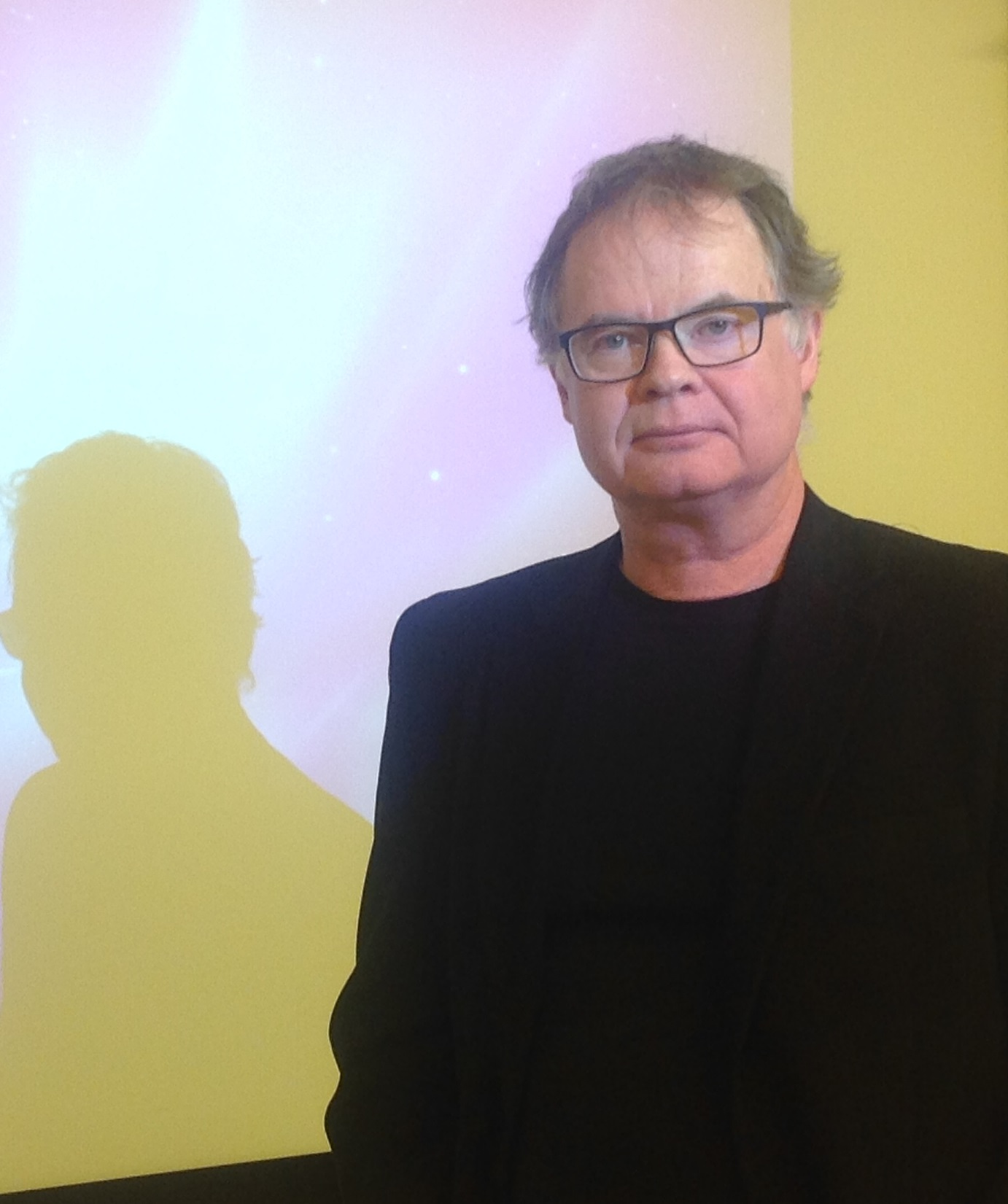
Frode Fjellheim in 2014

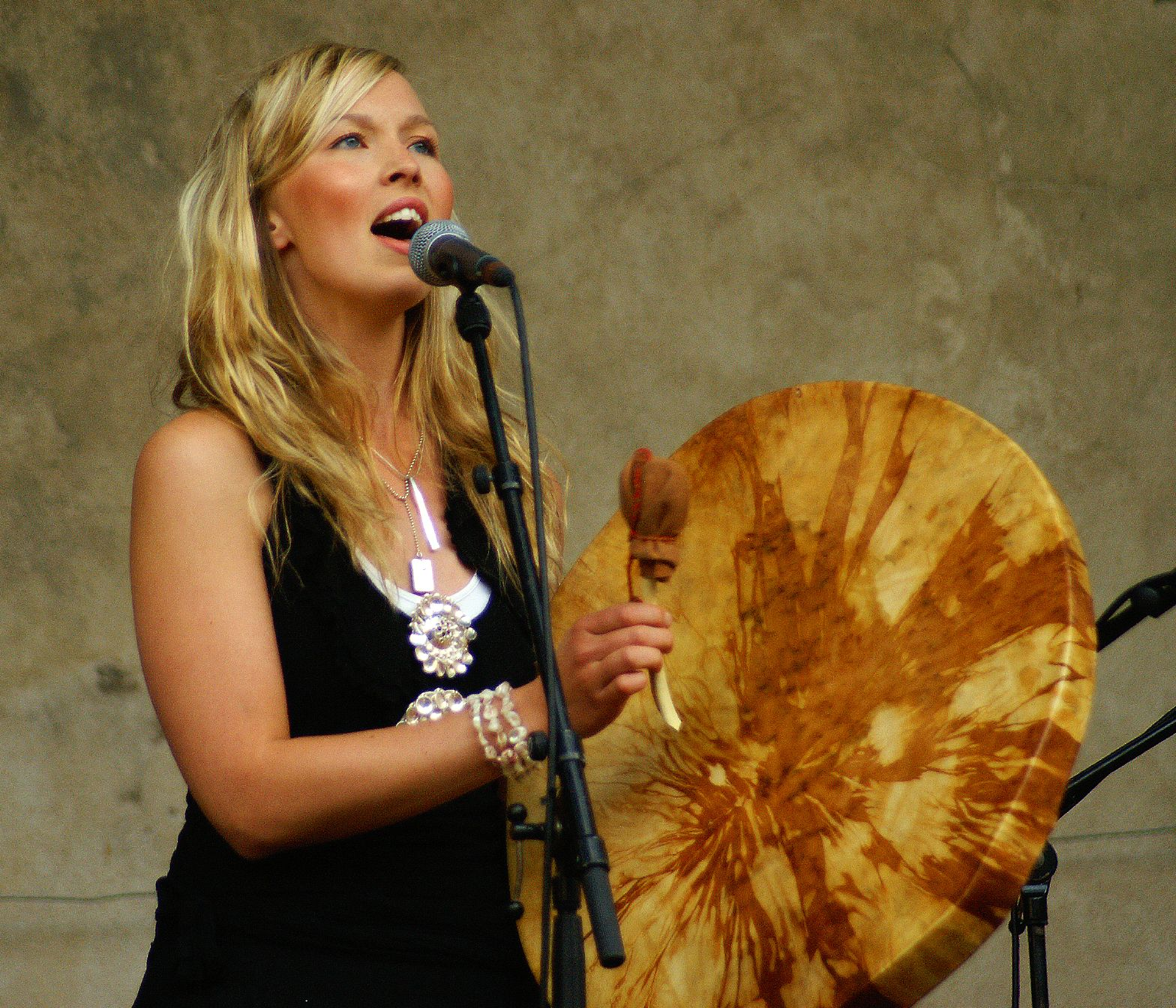
Sofia Jannok in 2007

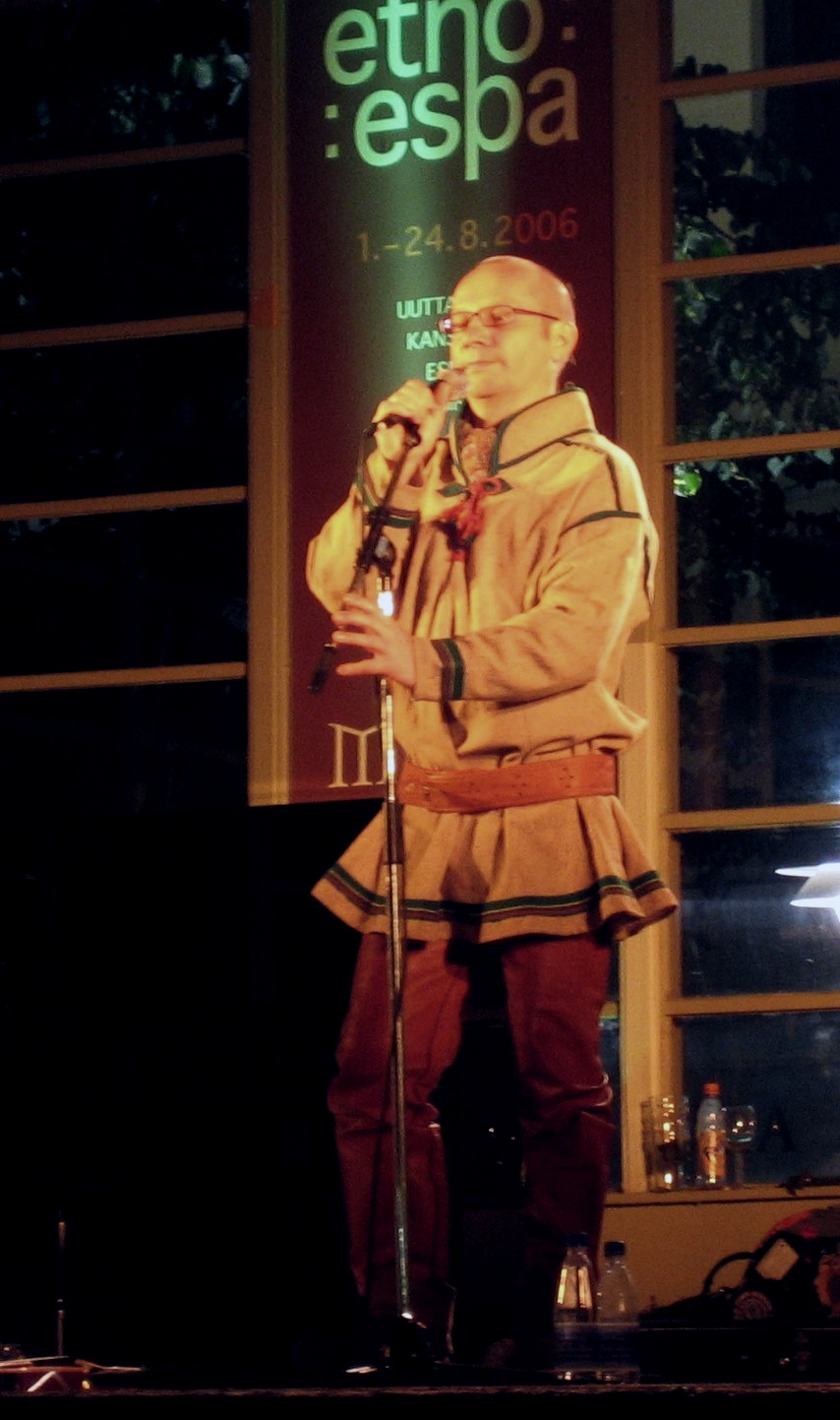
Wimme in 2006

The Áillohaš Music Award is an annual Sámi music award created to commemorate Nils-Aslak Áillohaš Valkeapää's 50th birthday in 1993. The winner of the award is announced on Holy Saturday in conjunction with the Sámi Grand Prix during the Sámi Easter Festival. It is conferred by Kautokeino Municipality and the Kautokeino Sámi Association. The winner receives a monetary prize of 20,000 Norwegian crowns, a diploma, a piece of artwork, and a two-week stay at Lásságámmi.

== History ==
The Áillohaš Music Award was created in 1993 by the Norwegian Sámi Association, Kautokeino Municipality, and the Kautokeino Sámi Association. It has been awarded every year since 1993, including 2020 even though the Sámi Easter Festival had been cancelled. The recipient can be a Sámi musician or musicians, or a band.

The prize is awarded to honor the significant contributions the recipient or recipients has made to the diverse world of Sámi music. The first recipient of this award was Mari Boine. Over the years, quite a few of the most popular and famous Sámi musicians and bands have received this award, including Wimme, Sofia Jannok, Ulla Pirttijärvi-Länsman, and Frode Fjellheim have won the award. The award is not limited to just traditional Northern Sámi yoikers. As such, a wide variety of different music genres has been represented, from the heavy yoik of Intrigue to the traditional Kildin Sámi luvvts collected, recorded, and performed by Domna Khomyuk.

== Recipients ==
Year	Artist
1993	Mari Boine
1994	Johan Anders Bær
1995	Ole Larsen Gaino
1996	Wimme Saari
1997	Roger Ludvigsen
1998	Inga Juuso
1999	Iŋgor Ántte Áilu Gaup
2000	Sančuari
2001	Johan Sara jr.
2002	Frode Fjellheim
2003	Intrigue
2004	Anders P. Bongo
2005	Niko Valkeapää
2006	Dimitri joavku
2007	Ulla Pirttijärvi-Länsman
2008	Svein Schultz
2009	Liv Mæsel Rundberg
2010	Issát Sámmol Heatta
2011	Halvdan Nedrejord
2012	Marit Gaup Eira
2013	Magnus Vuolab
2014	Sofia Jannok
2015	Jussi Isokoski
2016	Johan Andreas Andersen
2017	Deatnogátte Nuorat
2018	Sara Marielle Gaup Beaska
2019	Domna Khomyuk
2020	SlinCraze
2021	Marja Mortensson
2022	Øystein Nilsen
2023	Maj-Lis Skaltje
2024	Ella Marie Hætta Isaksen
2025	Jon Henrik Fjällgren
2026	Mikkâl Morottaja
2026	Áilu Valle
