= Gaup =

Gaup is a surname. Notable people with the surname include:

- Ailo Gaup (author) (1944–2014), Norwegian author and shaman
- Ailo Gaup (motocross rider) (born 1979), Norwegian motocross rider
- Ingor Ánte Áilo Gaup (born 1960), Norwegian actor, composer, and folk musician
- Johanne Gaup (born 1950), Norwegian politician
- Marit Gaup Eira, Sámi activist, musician, singer, and yoiker
- Mikkel Gaup (born 1968), Norwegian film and stage actor
- Nils Gaup (born 1955), Norwegian film director
- Sara Marielle Gaup Beaska
