= Snorre Bjerck =

Norwegian jazz musician

- Birth name: Snorre Bjartmann Bjerck
- Born: 25 February 1962 (age 63); Florø, Sogn og Fjordane
- Origin: Norway
- Genres: Jazz, Electronica
- Occupation: Musician
- Instrument: Percussion Drums Vocals

Snorre Bjartmann Bjerck (born 25 February 1962) is a Norwegian jazz musician (drums, percussion and vocals). He has played in bands like "First Set", Jon Balke, Batagraf, and the sami band Transjoik., and is otherwise known from recordings and performances with others like: Morten Harket, Sissel Kyrkjebø, Mari Boine, Nils Petter Molvær, Bjørn Eidsvåg, Sigvart Dagsland, Frode Alnæs, Eivind Aarset, Annbjørg Lien, Arve Henriksen, Nils-Olav Johansen, Tim Whelan Trans Global Underground, Karoline Krüger among others.

== Career ==
Bjerck was born in Florø. He was a student on the Jazz program at Trondheim Musikkonservatorium [2]Musikkonservatorium[2]Musikkonservatorium (1984–86). He performs in the band Transjoik, Batagraf with Jon Balke, Helge Norbakken, Ingar Zach, and in his own musical projects. His uses percussion instruments from around the world, along with distinctive vocals and electronic sounds.

He made his solo recording debut with the album My Place (2006), and is influenced by traditional folk music and different environments, using unique samples collected during his tours in Europa, America, Asia and Afrika. These are used as mood elements in the production of a totally new format. Bjerck is often accompanied by guest musicians like the Sami joiker Ingor Ánte Áilo Gaup, and the Swiss bassist Mich Gerber. The production is his own assisted by Transjoik colleague Frode Fjellheim.

== Honors ==
- Vossajazzprisen 2007.

== Discography (in selection) ==
=== Solo works ===
- 2006: My place (Vuelie)

=== Collaborative works ===
Within Transjoik

- 1994: "JazzJoik Ensemble: Saajve Dans" (Idut)
- 1997: "Mahkalahke" (Warner Bros.)
- 2000: "Meavraa" (Warner Bros.)
- 2003: "Remix Project EP" (Vuelie)
- 2004: Uja Nami (Vuelie)
- 2005: Bewafá (Vuelie)

With others

- 1996: Letters (Turn Left), with Håvard Lund
- 1997: Ruošša Eanan (Atrium), with Ulla Pirttijärvi
- 1997: Ruošša Eanan (Turn Left), with Ulla Pirttijärvi
- 2003: Vind (Heilo), with Hans Fredrik Jacobsen
- 2008: Áibbaseapmi, with Ulla Pirttijärvi
- 2008: Taus, with Sigrid Moldestad
- 2010: Meelodi, Ole Andre Farstad
- 2011: December Song, Carsten Dyngeland Trio
- 2015: As I Walk, Anne Vada
- 2015: Spes, Cantus
- 2015: Barúos, Catarina Barruk
- 2015: Whatever Happens, Nils Are Drønen
- 2016: Tron Jensen
- 2016: Anodyne, Batagraf/Trondheim Voices
- 2016: Early Spring, Marja Mortenson Fjellheim

Awards
Preceded by Yngve Moe	Recipient of the Vossajazzprisen; 2007	Succeeded by Mads Berven

== Videos ==
Batagraf https://vimeo.com/155655708 Batagraf https://vimeo.com/40399398 Batagraf https://vimeo.com/40396079
