= Marja Mortensson =

Sámi singer from Norway (born 1965)

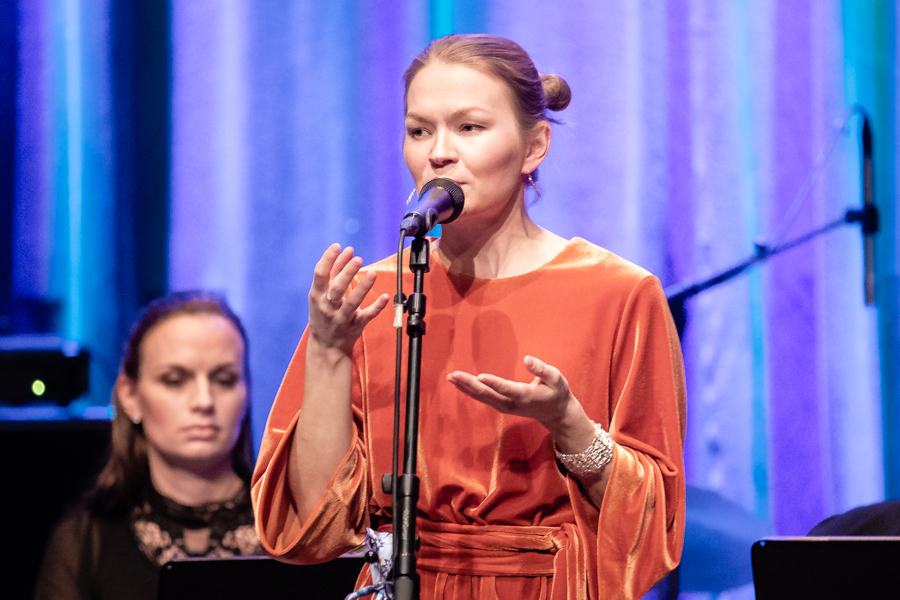
Mortensson in 2019

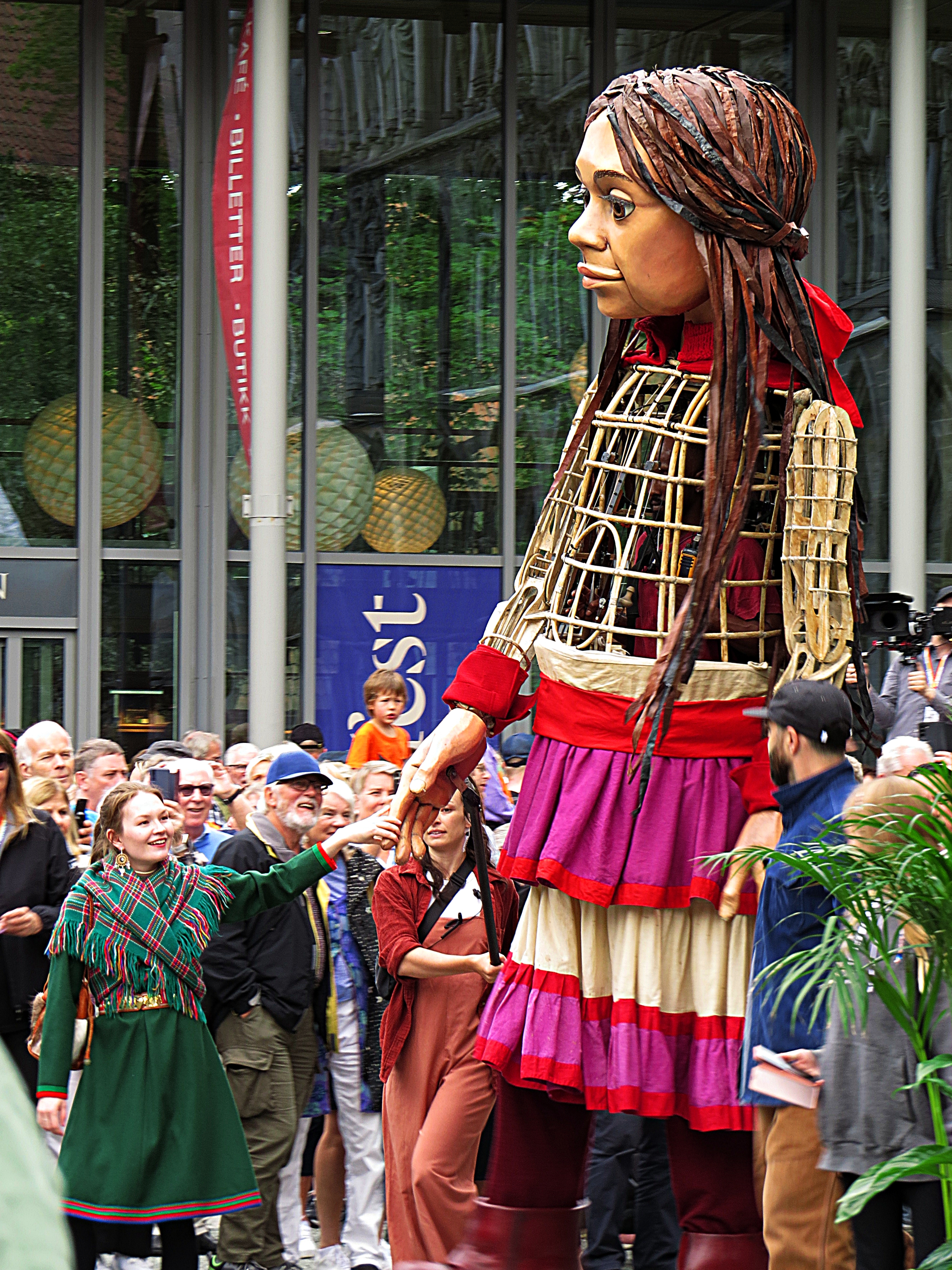
Marja Mortensson with Little Amal at Olavsfestdagene in July 2023.

Marja Helena Fjellheim Mortensson (born 1995) is a South Sámi singer from Engerdal in Innlandet county, Norway. She won the 2018 Spellemannprisen (described as "Norway's equivalent of the Grammy Awards) in the folk/traditional music category for her album Mojhtestasse – Cultural Heirlooms, and in 2021 for Raajroe – The Reindeer Caravan.

== Life ==
Mortensson comes from a family of reindeer herders, and grew up in Svahken sijte, a Siida in Hedmark county. Her family belongs to the South Sámi ethnic minority, whose language and culture are important influences for her music. Mortensson sings in her native language, Southern Sámi, which is only spoken by about 500 people today. The traditional South Sami joik has also largely disappeared from her area and so an important part of her music is based on old recordings and lyrics as well as individual traditions. In addition to her own research, she studied joik and Sami culture at the Nord University in Levanger under the Sami musician Frode Fjellheim, who is also the producer and co-composer of her 2017 debut album Aarehgïjre – Early Spring.

In 2018, Mojhtestasse – Cultural Heirlooms followed, a collaboration with Daniel Herskedal and Jakop Janssønn, which contains a mixture of traditional joiks and new compositions and was created on the occasion of the 100th anniversary of the first Sami country meeting in Trondheim in 1917. The third album Lååje – Dawn, released in 2019, is also a collaboration with Herskedal. She can also be heard on his album A Single Sunbeam (2024).

In 2017, she was appointed as Fylkesjoiker (County Joiker) in the county of Troms for the year.

She is one of the main characters in the 2023 Swiss documentary film Beyond Tradition: Kraft der Naturstimmen (Beyond Tradition: Power of Nature's Voices), in which she talks about what traditions and joik mean to her.

== Discography ==
- Aarehgïjre – Early Spring (2017, Vuelie)
- Mojhtestasse – Cultural Heirlooms (2018, Vuelie) (with Jakop Janssønn and Daniel Herskedal)
- Lååje – Dawn (2019, Vuelie) (with Daniel Herskedal and Trondheim Soloists String Quartet)
- Raajroe – The Reindeer Caravan (2021, Vuelie) (with The Norwegian Radio Orchestra, Daniel Herskedal, Jakop Janssønn)
- Båalmaldahkesne – Entwined (2024)

== Awards ==
- 2013: Hedmark Fylkeskommunens Kulturpris
- 2014: Riddu Riđđu Young Artist of the Year
- 2016: Sami Music Awards
- 2018: Spellemannprisen (In the category Folk Music/Traditional Dance)
- 2021: Áillohaš Music Award
- 2021: Spellemannprisen (In the category Traditional Music)
