= Inga Juuso =

- Born: 5 October 1945; Mosjøen, Norway
- Origin: Sami
- Died: 23 August 2014 (aged 68) Norway
- Genres: Traditional sami folk music, jazz, world, ambient
- Occupations: Musician (vocals), actor
- Instrument: Vocals
- Labels: Vuelie, DAT
- Website: musicnorway.no/artist/inga-juuso

Inga Juuso (5 October 1945 – 23 August 2014) was a Sami yoiker, singer and actress in the film The Kautokeino Rebellion. She was known from her own band performances, and recordings and collaborations with musicians like Steinar Raknes, Håkon Mjåset Johansen, and Jørn Øien.

== Career ==
Juuso was the first Sami named "Traditional Folk Musician of the year" in Norway 2012, and had a long career performing with various musicians in Scandinavia. She also appeared in the film The Kautokeino Rebellion (2008) by Nils Gaup, and was recognized as a major carrier and promoter of the Sami cultural tradition.

In 2008, she released the album Patterns of the heart (DAT) by the Inga Juuso Group, followed by "Bálggis" ("Vuelie"), with the musical group Bárut.

== Awards and honours ==
In 1998, she was awarded the Áillohaš Music Award for her significant contributions to Saami music. She was also awarded the title of Spellemannprisen in 2011.

== Death ==
Juuso died on 23 August 2014, aged 68.

== Discography ==
- 1991: "Ravddas Ravddi" (DAT), produced by Ande Somby.
- 1994: "Čalbmeliiba" ("Frozen moments"/"Momentos inolvidables"; Iđut), with Johan Sara, Jai Shankar and flamenco musicians Rogelio de Badajoz Duran and Erik Steen
- 2008: "Vaimmo Ivnnit" ("Where the rivers meet"; DAT), with the duo Skáidi (including Steinar Raknes) The album includes a yoik dedicated to Majlis (Maj-Lis) Ingegerd Skaltje
- 2008: "Patterns of the heart" (DAT), with the Inga Juuso Group, including Patrick Shaw Iversen, Kenneth Ekornes, Steinar Raknes, Peter Baden and Roger Ludvigsen
- 2011: "Bálggis" ("Vuelie"), with Barut (including Martin Smidt & Asbjørn Berson)

Awards
Preceded by Roger Ludvigsen	Recipient of the Áillohaš Music Award; 1998	Succeeded by Iŋgor Ántte Áilu Gaup
Preceded by Jaga Jazzist	Recipient of the Open class Spellemannprisen; 2011	Succeeded by Farmers Market
Preceded by Marit Sandvik	Recipient of the Nordlysprisen; 2012	Succeeded by Nils Anders Mortensen
