= Tanabreddens Ungdom =

Sámi band from Finnmark, Norway

Tanabreddens Ungdom (Northern Sami: Deatnogátte Nuorat (new orthography), Dædnugátte nuorat (old orthography) and Finnish: Tenonrannan nuoret) was a Sámi band established in 1973 in Karasjok Municipality, Norway. The band is known for being the first band to popularize the yoik with the record release on the record company MAI 7402, 1974). Since yoiking had been banned in Norwegian schools to some extent, the release of their album garnered a lot of attention and the album sold more than 20,000 copies and even made it on the charts (Norsktoppen).

Jovnna (JLP 909, 1982) was released in 1982 with Tore Aslaksen standing in for Wigelius. Tanabreddens Ungdom's latest release is from 2001 when they released a collection called Deatnogátte Nuorat – Buoremusat - The Best Of Tanabreddens Ungdom (Iđut 2001). Anne-Lise Solbakk also contributed her talent to this latest record. 2004 saw the band celebrating their 30 years of being together with a series of concerts. In addition, the band was portrayed on the program «Sápmelaš Oaivil» broadcast by NRK.

== Awards ==
In 2017, Deatnogátte Nuorat received the Áillohaš Music Award, a Sámi music award conferred by Kautokeino Municipality and the Kautokeino Sámi Association to honor the significant contributions the recipient or recipients has made to the diverse world of Sámi music.

== Line-up ==
- Irene Pettersen
- Leif Wigelius
- Ingvald Guttorm
- Hartvik Hansen

Awards
Preceded by Johan Andreas Andersen	Recipient of the Áillohaš Music Award; 2017	Succeeded by Sara Marielle Gaup Beaska
