= Transjoik =

Norwegian band

Transjoik, originally named Frode Fjellheim Jazzjoik Ensemble (founded 1992 in Trondheim, Norway by Frode Fjellheim), is a Norwegian band that plays Sámi music, often characterised as an ambient electronic, techno and trance band, but with a dose of yoiking, so it is often considered world music.

== Discography ==
- Saajve Dance (Iđut 1994)
- Mahkalahke (Warner Bros. 1997)
- Meavraa (Warner Bros. 2000)
- Uja Nami (Vuelie 2004), nominated for a Spellemannsprisen
- Bewafá with vocals by Sher Mianfad Khan from Pakistan (Vuelie 2005)

== Members ==
- Frode Fjellheim (synth, vocals)
- Tor Haugerud (percussion, vocals)
- Nils-Olav Johansen (bass guitar, vocals)
- Snorre Bjerck (percussion, vocals)

== Awards ==
- Liet International in the Netherlands, for Mijjajaa (2003)
