= Angeli, Finland =

Angeli (Finnish) Áŋŋel (Northern Sami)
- Village
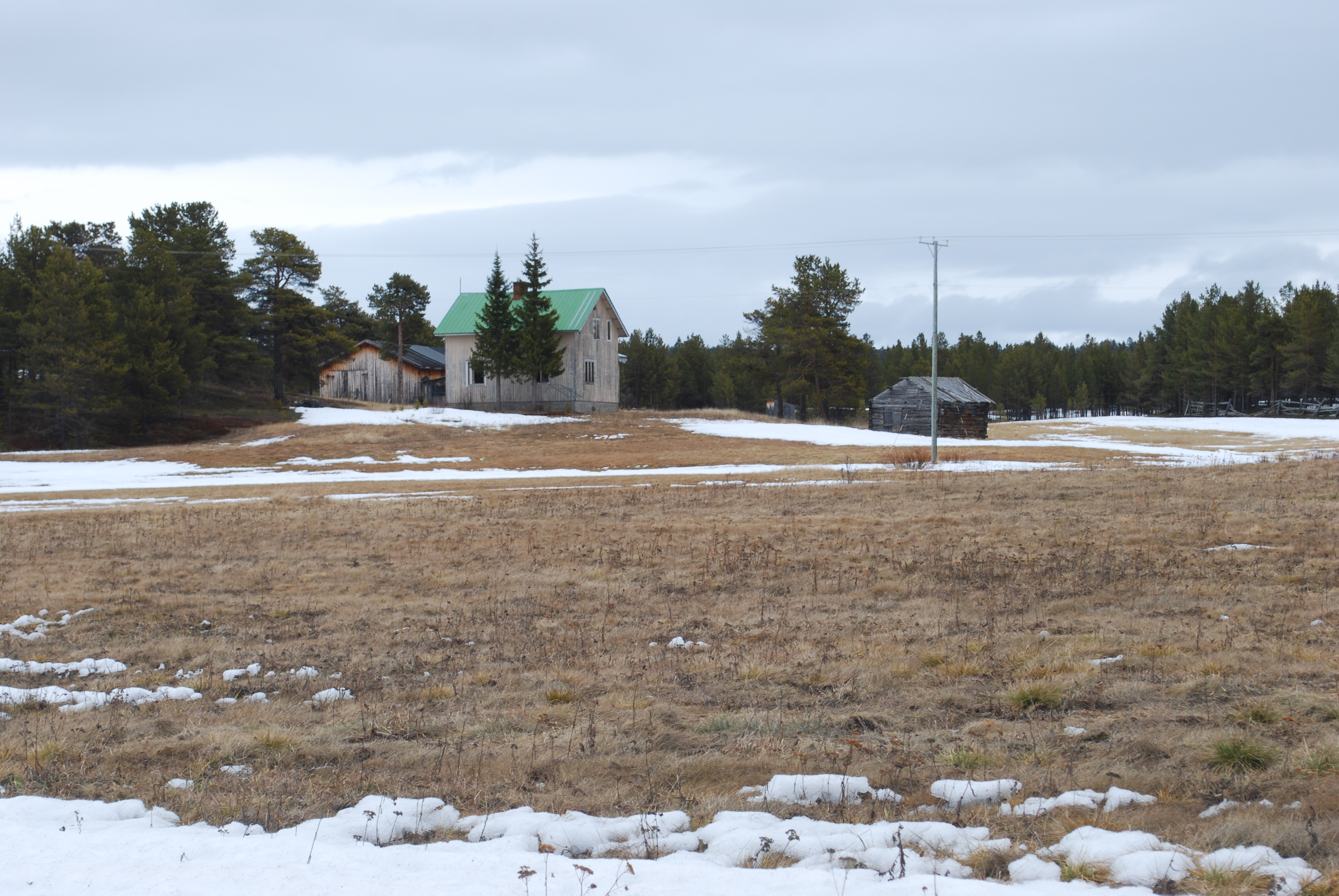

- Location in Finland
- Coordinates: 68°54′N 25°39′E
- Country: Finland
- Province: Lapland
- Municipality: Inari
- Time zone: UTC+2 (EET)

Angeli (Northern Sami: Áŋŋel) is a village in Lapland. It is 62 kilometres (39 mi) west of village of Inari in the municipality of Inari near the Muotkatunturi Wilderness Area in Finland. The Inari River flows by the village, which is located close to the Norwegian border. Most of the people speak Northern Sámi as their native language.

The village is connected by all-weather gravel roads north to Karigasniemi and east to the village of Inari.

Angeli is called the "darkest village in Finland"; measured on the Bortle scale, Angeli's degree of darkness is one, which is why the darkness is so deep at night time that not even shapes can be distinguished from the landscape of the horizon.

== History ==
The name of Angeli is derived from the surname Angeli, originating from the village of Peltovuoma (Bealdovuopmi) in Enontekiö. The surname is derived from the name of the lake Angelijärvi, itself derived from a Kemi Sámi word referring to the long-tailed duck (compare Inari Sámi áŋálâh). In the middle of the 19th century, two young men from the Angeli family moved from Peltovuoma to Inari, with the village eventually growing around their settlement.

== Notable people ==
- Ulla Pirttijärvi-Länsman (born 1971), a joik singer

== See also ==
- Angelit
- Lappmarken
- Sami people
- Sápmi (area)
