= Marit Gaup Eira =

Marit Gaup Eira Šelgon Joreha Máret
- Born: November 13, 1945 (age 79)
- Genres: yoik
- Occupation(s): reindeer herder, singer, yoiker
- Instrument: voice

Marit Gaup Eira or Šelgon Joreha Máret (born July 13, 1945) is a Northern Sámi reindeer herder, singer, and yoiker. She has won the yoiking category of the Sámi Grand Prix three times: in 1993, 1997, and 2003. She has also placed third in the same category three times: 1996, 1998, and 2002.

== Early life ==
Marit Ragna Jørgensdatter Gaup (Šelgon Joreha Máret) and her twin sister Risten Sara Jørgensdatter Gaup (Šelgon Joreha Risten Sárá) were born on July 13, 1945, the fifth and sixth children of reindeer herders Jørgen Johansen Gaup (Šelgon Joret, 1893–1960) and Kristine Larsdatter Gaino (Bánni Risten, 1904–1977). A few years later, two more siblings were born, bringing the total up to 8. Later on, she married Mikkel Andersen Eira.

== Music ==
Eira started to yoik when she was herding reindeer since her mother was a devout Christian and would not let her yoik in the house, as this was considered a sin. She became a talented yoiker who went on to win many yoiking competitions. For example, she made the final of the yoiking category in the Sámi Grand Prix ten times. Of those ten times, she won the category three times and placed in third place another three.

Her first album, a solo album called Beaskađas, was published in 2004. The album mainly consists of traditional personal yoiks. The next year, Eira and her husband yoiked on Maj-Lis Skaltje's album Davvi Jienat - Northern Voices, which introduces listeners to three styles of traditional Sámi vocal music: yoiks, vuelie, and leuʹdds, the latter two of which are often mistaken for yoiks by non-Sámi people. In 2009, Eira and her twin sister released an album of Northern Sámi hymns called Ipmeláhči Hálddus. In 2013, Eira and her husband once again teamed together to yoik, when they appeared in Skaltje's movie Juoigan.

== Awards ==
In 2012, Eira received the Áillohaš Music Award, a Sámi music award conferred by Kautokeino Municipality and the Kautokeino Sámi Association to honor the significant contributions the recipient or recipients has made to the diverse world of Sámi music.

== Discography ==
- 2004 – Beaskađas
- 2009 – Ipmeláhči Hálddus together with Risten Sara Gaup Turi

=== Compilation albums ===
- 2002 – Sámi Grand Prix 2002
- 2003 – Sámi Grand Prix 2003
- 2005 – Davvi Jienat
- 2010 – Sámi Grand Prix 2010
- 2018 – Sámi Grand Prix 2018

Awards
| Preceded by Halvdan Nedrejord | Recipient of the Áillohaš Music Award; 2012 | Succeeded by Magnus Vuolab |
