= Anfisa Ageeva =

Anfisa Ageyeva
- Also known as: Anfisa Zakharova; Anfisa Ageeva; Anfisa Agueva; Anfisa Maksimovna Zakharova
- Born: 12 February 1952 (age 73); Kanevka, Murmansk, Soviet Union
- Genres: luvvt (Kildin Sámi: лыввьт or луввьт)
- Occupations: author, translator, musician
- Instrument: voice

Anfisa Maksimovna Ageeva, also Anfisa/Anfissa Agejeva/Ageyeva (Russian: Анфиса Максимовна Агеева, née Zakharova (Russian: Захарова); born 12 February 1952, in Kanevka, Murmansk, Soviet Union) is a Russian Kildin Sámi author, translator, musician, and activist. In 2001, she was the first Sámi person from Russia to participate in the Sámi Grand Prix and the first to win it.

== Early life ==
Anfisa Maksimovna Zakharova was born on 12 February 1952 in Kanevka (Russian: Канёвка). Her parents were reindeer herders and decorated war veterans. Her father was Maksim Antonovich Zakharov (1919–1984) and her mother Mariya Ivanovna Zakharova (1922–2008). Together they went on to have a total of 9 children.

In 1962, the Soviet Union decided to build the Serebryanskaya hydroelectric power station near where they lived. To do this, they had to dam the Koarrdõgk River. A few years later, when the entire village of Koarrdõgk was going to be flooded and submerged under the new reservoir, the family were moved to Lovozero.

== Music ==
The traditional vocal music of the East Sámi, mostly known as leuʹdd from Skolt Sámi (Kildin Sami: лыввьт) has been a part of Ageeva's life since she was born. Both Ageeva's mother and grandmother sang luvvts and her mother was a famous singer of them. Her mother sang these with music groups like Lujavvr (Kildin Sami: Луяввьр) and Ojar (Kildin Sami: Ойяр). Some of her luvvts have been recorded; these are archived in Norway, Estonia, Germany, etc. Ageeva's sister, Domna Khomyuk, is also well known for her luvvt singing.

Over the years, Ageeva has performed luvvts many times in the yoik category of the Sámi Grand Prix both alone and with her sister Domna Khomyuk. In 2001, Agejeva entered the contest for the first time with a luvvt called Meleš, which she placed first in the yoik category A couple of years later, she entered again in the same category, but this time with her sister Domna Khomyuk. Their luvvt was called Duottar. Ageeva tried to win the yoik category again in 2007 and 2013, with the entries Sorrow and Luottáš respectively. In 2019, she and her sister were back with a luvvt called Vuess. Since her win in 2001, she has not placed in the top 3 in the yoik category.

In addition to performing luvvts, Ageeva and her sister also collect and record them, ensuring that future generations will have access to them.

== Written work ==
Ageeva has translated books and songs into her mother tongue of Kildin Sámi. For example, in 2021, she translated the traditional Victory Day song into Kildin Sámi with the title of Вуэјјтэм Пе̄ййв.

== Publications ==
=== Editorial work ===
- 2014 – Са̄мь-рӯшш са̄ннҍнэххьк / Саамско-Русский словарь by A. A. Antonova (ed. together with Semyon Galkin, Domna Khomyuk, Elisabeth Scheller)

=== Translations ===
- 2007 – Вӣллькесь пуаз (translation of Ivan Yakovlevich Matryokhin's The White Reindeer, Russian: "Белый олень" together with A. A. Antonova)
- 2019 – Same: 100 mennesker i Sápmi/100 people in Sápmi/100 olbmo Sámis
- 2021 – Вуэјјтэм Пе̄ййв (from the Russian День Победы)

== Discography ==
=== Compilation albums ===
- 2001 – Sami Grand Prix 2001
- 2003 – Sami Grand Prix 2003 together with Domna Khomyuk
- 2005 – Davvi Jienat - Northern Voices
- 2007 – Sami Grand Prix '07
- 2013 – Sámi Grand Prix 2013
- 2014 – Сборник саамских песен
- 2015 – Сборник саамских сказок
- 2017 – Богатырь Ляйне
- 2019 – Sámi Grand Prix 2019 together with Domna Khomyuk
