= Torgeir Vassvik =

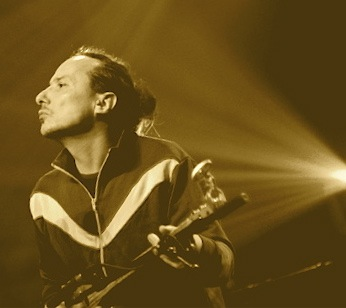
- Torgeir Vassvik (Arctic Soundpoet)

Background information
- Born: 3 October 1962 (age 63); Gamvik Municipality, Sápmi/Norway
- Genres: Joik, overtone singing, world, jazz, rock
- Occupations: Musician, songwriter, composer
- Instruments: Vocals, frame drum, guitar, jaw harp, percussion
- Years active: 1998–present
- Website: vassvik.com

Torgeir Vassvik (born 3 October 1962 in Gamvik Municipality, Sápmi) is a Norwegian Sami musician and composer. Vassvik combines Joik with drum and traditional instruments,.

== Discography ==
- Sáivu, (Iđut 2006), producer Arve Henriksen
- Sápmi, (Iđut 2009), producer Jan Martin Smørdal
- Gákti, (Heilo 2019), producer Torgeir Vassvik, Babette Michel
- Báiki, (OKWord) 2022), producer Babette Michell, Torgeir Vassvik
- White, (Eighth Nerve Audio) 2024) producer Juhani Silvola & Torgeir Vassvik
