= Johan Turi =

Sami author (1854–1936)

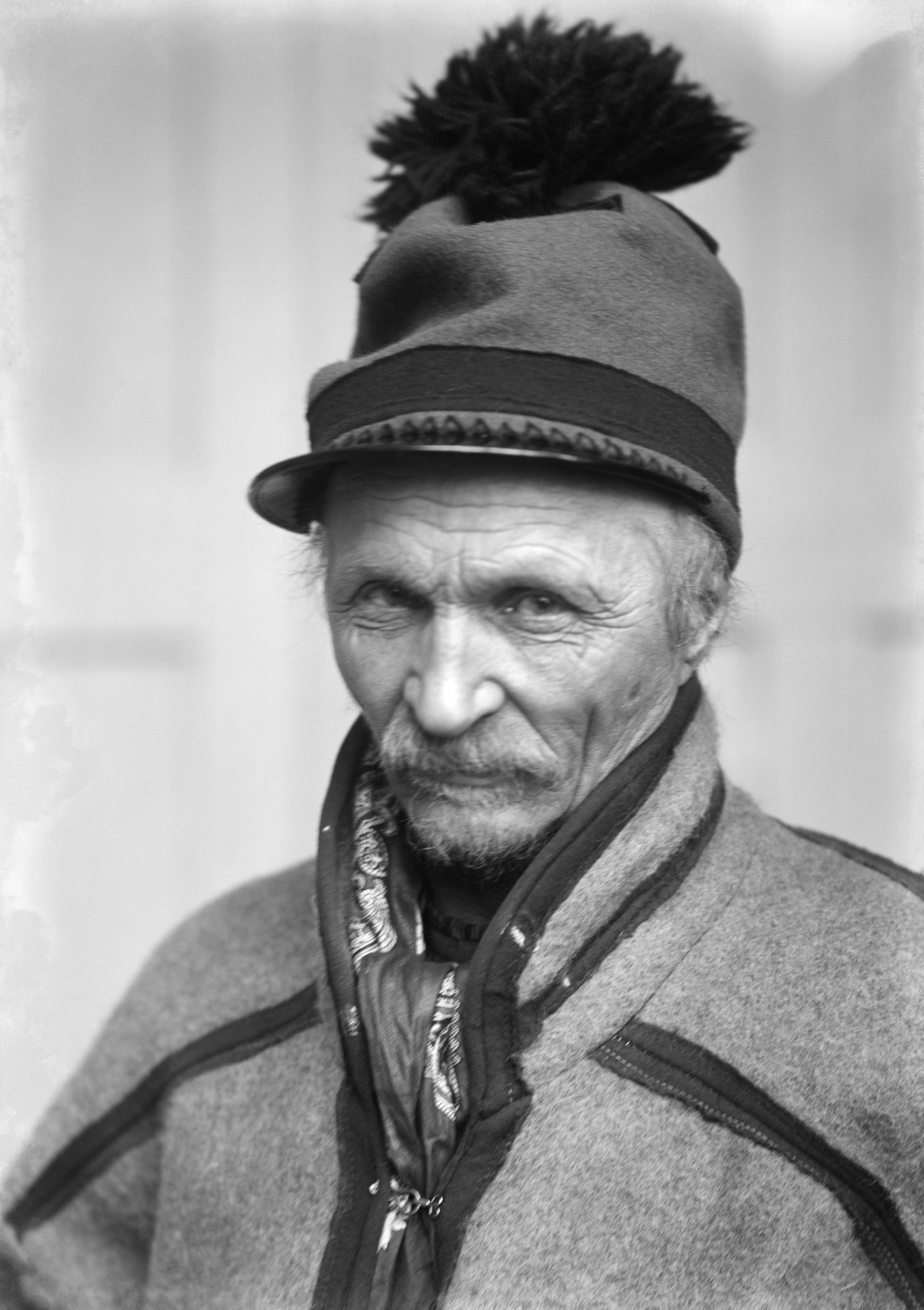
- Johan Turi
- Born: 12 March 1854; Kautokeino, Norway
- Died: 30 November 1936 (aged 82); Jukkasjärvi, Sweden
- Occupations: Sami author, reindeer herder

Johan Turi, born Johannes Olsen Thuri also spelt Johan Tuuri or Johan Thuri or Johan Thuuri (12 March 1854 – 30 November 1936) was the first Sami author to publish a secular work in a Sami language. His first book was called Muitalus sámiid birra (An Account of the Sami) and tells about the life of people herding reindeer in the Jukkasjärvi region of northern Sweden at the beginning of the 20th century. An eclectic and nuanced text, Muitalus includes details on Sami traditions of child rearing, hunting, healing, yoik, and folklore. At its heart the text aims to draw outsiders' attention to the intrinsic value of Sami culture.

Turi was born in Kautokeino, Norway, but moved with his family to the Talma Sámi community near Jukkasjärvi, Sweden, in the 1880s. In 1904, he met the art student Emilie Demant Hatt on a train in northern Scandinavia. Through an interpreter, he told her he wanted to write a book about Lapps, while she told him she wanted to be a nomad. Three years later, having learned the Sami language, Demant-Hatt returned to northern Scandinavia and lived with Turi's family. In 1908, Turi and Demant-Hatt lived in a mountain cabin where she assisted him with his manuscript. Turi died in Jukkasjärvi.

The book has been translated into some ten languages, including Swedish, Danish, Finnish, English, Norwegian, German, French, Italian, Hungarian and Japanese.

In 2005, a documentary film was made about Turi by the Sami film director Majlis (Maj-Lis) Ingegerd Skaltje.

In 2011, Nordic Studies Press published an English edition of Turi's An Account of the Sami, translated by folklorist and professor of Scandinavian Studies Thomas A. DuBois.

In 2025, Muitalus sámiid birra became part of the Swedish Culture Canon (Kulturkanon); the committee that decided the content of the canon, was led by Lars Trägårdh.

== Works ==
- 1910 – Muitalus sámiid birra (Turi's book of Lappland)
- 1920 – Sámi deavsttat (Texts in Sami)
- 1931 – Duoddaris (From the Mountain)
