= Domna Khomyuk =

Domna Khomyuk Туомн Хомюк
- Also known as: Domna Zakharova; Domna Khomjuk; Domna Maksimovna Zakharova; Domna Maksimovna Khomjuk
- Born: Туомн Хомюк; Домна Максимовна Хомюк; September 10, 1954 (age 71); Koarrdõgk, Murmansk, Soviet Union
- Genres: luvvt (Kildin Sámi: лыввьт or луввьт)
- Occupation(s): zootechnician, author, translator, musician
- Instrument: voice

Domna Maksimovna Khomyuk (née Zakharova, Kildin Sami: Туомн Хомюк, Russian: Домна Максимовна Хомюк, née Захарова; born September 10, 1954, in Koarrdõgk, Murmansk, Soviet Union) is a Russian Kildin Sámi zootechnician, author, translator, and musician. She is also active in the revitalization of the Kildin Sámi language and culture.

== Early life ==
Domna Maksimovna Khomyuk was born on September 10, 1954, in Koarrdõgk (Kildin Sami: Коа̄ррдэгк and Russian: Воронье). Her parents were reindeer herders and decorated war veterans. Her father was Maksim Antonovich Zakharov (1919–1984) and her mother Mariya Ivanovna Zakharova (1922–2008). Together they went on to have a total of 9 children

In 1962, the Soviet Union decided to build the Serebryanskaya hydroelectric power station near where they lived. To do this, they had to dam the Koarrdõgk River. A few years later, when the entire village of Koarrdõgk was going to be flooded and submerged under the new reservoir, the family were moved to Lovozero.

== Education and career ==
Khomyuk majored in zootechnology at Sortavala Agricultural School (Russian: Сортавальский сельскохозяйственный техникум). After graduation, she worked more than 25 years in an agricultural production cooperative. Later on, she started working in various public administration posts. In addition, she started to serve the public in various positions of responsibility such as the 10 years she spent as the president of the Lovozero election committee, as a member on the board of the yoikers' association Juoigiid Searvi, and as a member of the Working Group of Indigenous Peoples in the Barents-Euro Arctic Region.

== Music ==
The traditional vocal music of the Kildin Sámi called luvvt or livvt (Kildin Sami: лыввьт or луввьт) has been a part of Khomyuk's life since she was born. Both Ageeva's mother and grandmother sang luvvts and her mother was a famous singer of them. Her mother sang these with music groups like Lujavvr (Kildin Sami: Луяввьр) and Ojar (Kildin Sami: Ойяр). Some of her luvvts have been recorded; these are archived in Norway, Estonia, Germany, etc. Khomyuk's sister, Anfisa Ageeva, is also well-known for her luvvt singing.

In 2002, the year after her sister won the yoik category of the Sámi Grand Prix, Khomyuk entered the yoik and song competition for the first time. Her entry for the yoik category was a luvvt called Luojavr (Kildin Sami: Луяввьр), which describes Lovozero, her home town. In 2003 and 2019 she competed in the same category, but now as a duo with her sister Anfisa Ageeva. In 2003, their entry was entitled Duottar and in 2019, Vuess. In 2021, Khomyuk entered the competition once again, this time as a solo act. Her entry was called Parrša vigket (Kildin Sami: Па̄ррьшя вигетѣ).

== Awards ==
On April 27, 2019, Khomyuk received the Áillohaš Music Award, a Sámi music award conferred by Kautokeino Municipality and the Kautokeino Sámi Association to honor the significant contributions the recipient or recipients has made to the diverse world of Sámi music.

== Publications ==
=== Editorial work ===
- 2014 – Са̄мь-рӯшш са̄ннҍнэххьк / Саамско-Русский словарь by A. A. Antonova

== Discography ==
=== Compilation albums ===
- 2002 – Sami Grand Prix 2002
- 2003 – Sami Grand Prix 2003 together with Anfisa Ageeva
- 2014 – Сборник саамских песен
- 2015 – Сборник саамских сказок
- 2017 – Богатырь Ляйне
- 2019 – Sámi Grand Prix 2019 together with Anfisa Ageeva
- 2021 – Sámi Grand Prix 2021

Awards
Preceded by Sara Marielle Gaup Beaska	Recipient of the Áillohaš Music Award; 2019	Succeeded by SlinCraze
