= Snorre =

Snorre can refer to either of the following:

- a Norwegian male name.
- famed Icelandic writer Snorre Sturlason
- an alternate name of Heimskringla, the saga Snorre Sturlason wrote about the Viking age.
- the Snorre oil field in the Norwegian sector of the North Sea.
- Snorre Bjerck
- Snorre Valen
