= Adjágas =

Norwegian joiker band

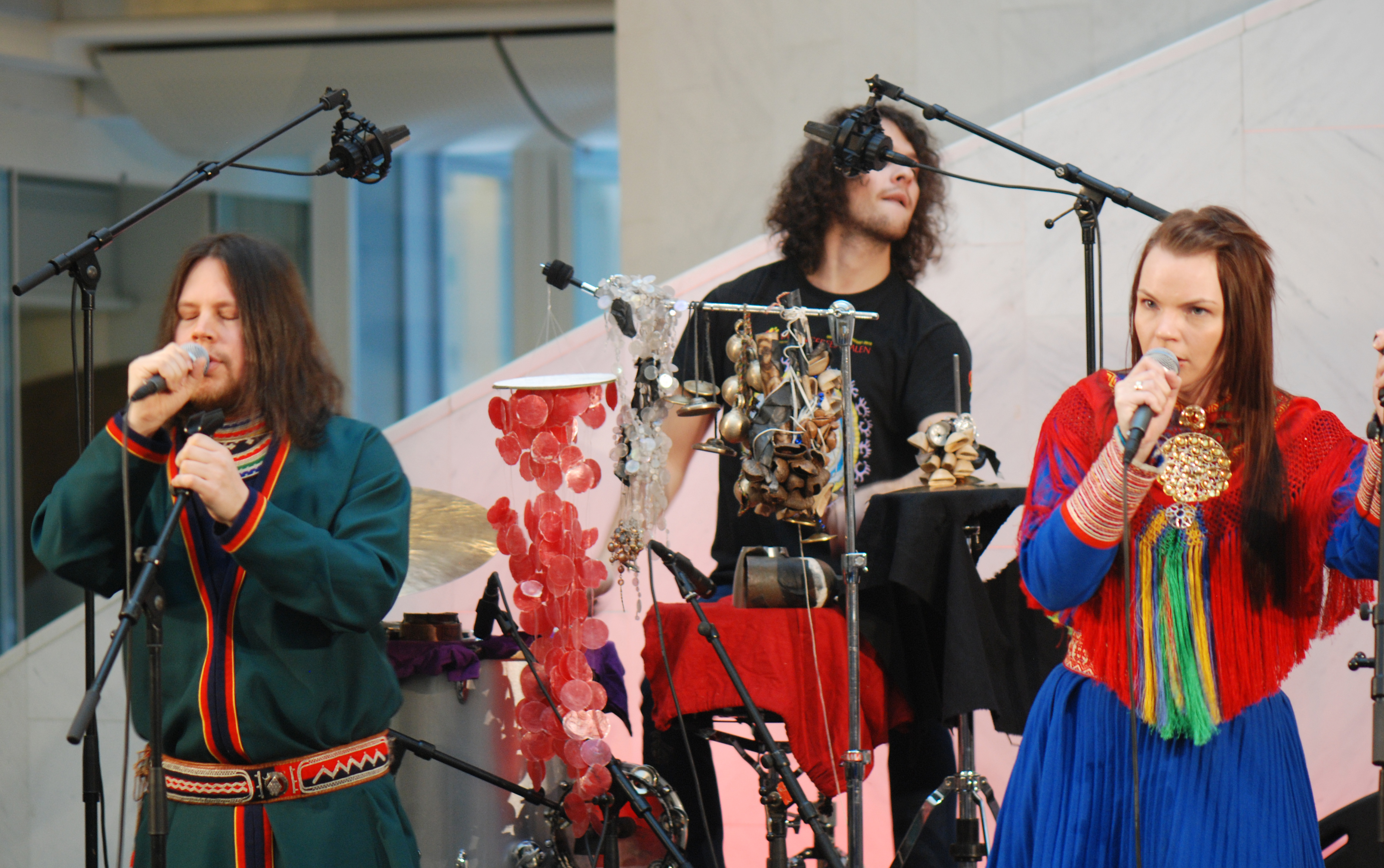
- Adjágas performing in 2012

Background information
- Origin: Norway
- Genres: Yoik; Indie; Folk
- Years active: 2004–2014
- Labels: Ever Records
- Members: Lawra Somby; Sara Marielle Gaup; Espen Elverum Jakobsen; Åsmund Wilter Eriksson; Aleksander Kostopoulos; Petter Marius Gundersen
- Past members: Stian Einmo; Paal Fagerheim; Juhani Silvola; Timo Silvola; Inga Elisa Påve; Ole-Morten Indigo Lekang
- Website: http://www.myspace.com/adjagas

Adjágas is a band from Sápmi, Norway composed of Sámi joikers, Lawra Somby and Sara Marielle Gaup, as well as a band of musicians. The group's name is a Sámi word describing the mental state experienced between waking and sleeping.

Adjágas was scheduled to open the 2005 Glastonbury Festival Pyramid Stage, but due to a flooding incident that caused electrical problems, their set was cancelled. However, they returned in 2007 to open the Pyramid Stage.

== Discography ==
- Adjágas (2005)
- Mánu Rávdnji (2009)
- Nordic Woman (2012)

== Band members ==
- Lawra Somby (vocals/yoik)
- Sara Marielle Gaup (vocals/yoik)
- Espen Elverum Jakobsen (guitar)
- Åsmund Wilter Eriksson (bass)
- Aleksander Kostopoulos (drums/percussion)
- Petter Marius Gundersen (horns/banjo)
