= Iđut =

Norwegian record label, publisher

Iđut AS
- Company type: Private
- Industry: Publishing
- Founded: 1985 in Indre Billefjord, Norway
- Founders: Åge Persen & Mari Boine
- Headquarters: Ikkaldas, Norway
- Products: Books, Music, Magazines
- Website: www.idut.no

Iđut AS is a Norwegian publisher of books and music, based in Ikkaldas in Porsanger Municipality, Finnmark county, Norway.

The company publishes novels, children's books, text books and school books, general literature, music and films. It also has publishes a bimonthly youth-culture magazine, Š, which is edited by Máret Ánne Sara. The main language for the books and music Iđut publishes is Northern Sámi, but it also publishes material in Lule Sámi, Southern Sámi, Kven, and Norwegian.

Iđut was founded in 1985 as a record label and expanded into book publishing in 1991. The company is headed by Åge Persen and its chief editor is Nan Persen. The company name, Iđut, comes from a Northern Sámi word that means to sprout in English.

== Music ==
- Karen Anne Buljo, Ábifruvvá (ICD 062, 2007)
- Torgeir Vassvik, Sáivu, joik/jazz, produced by Arve Henriksen (ICD 061, 2006)
- Lars-Ánte Kuhmunens, Birrasis, produced by Georg Buljo (ICD 052)
- Karine Jacobsen and Kine Johansen, Kadonu Ioru Kven pop (ICD 053)
- Ole Larsen Gaino, Luođis luohtái 3 (ICD 051)
- Tanabreddens Ungdom, Deatnogátte Nuorat – Buoremusat (the best of...) (ICD 011)
- Johan A. Andersen, Hoi hoi, mun lávlestan (ICD 991)
- Elen Inga Eira Sara, Mathis M. Gaup and Ole Larsen Gaino, Luođis luohtái 2 (ICD 972)
- Ella Holm Bull, Laavlomh maanide (ICD 973)
- Tanabreddens Irene Pettersen and Tore S. Aslaksen, Deatnogátte Irene ja Tore (ICD 971)
- Ella Holm Bull, Jåvle-laavlomh Christmas songs (ICD 962, 1997)
- Mr. Swingstang (Jostein Johansen), Mr. Swingstang (ICD 961)
- Marit Hætta Øverli, Ohcame produced by Svein Dag Hauge (ICD 942)
- Frode Fjellheim Jazz Joik Ensemble, Saajve Dans (ICD 943)
- Marie Kemi, Anne Kristine Gaup and Lennart Kullgren, Mun gal máhtán (ICD 941)
- Sverre Porsanger with Tone Åse, Lávlu lávlla, written by Eino Leino (translated by Pekka Sammallahti (ICD 932, 1993)
- Orbina (Leif Isak Eide Nilut/Roger Ludvigsen/Bjørn Ole Rasch), Orbina (ICD 931, 1993)
- Elen Inga Eira Sara, Ole Larsen Gaino, Inga Gaup Tornensis and Mathis M. Gaup, Luođis luohtái (ICD 921)
- Frode Fjellheim, Mijjen vuelieh (ICD 911)
- Mari Boine, Gula gula (ICD 891)
- Sáve (Magnus Vuolab/Ellen Vuolab), Ále mana vuos (ICD 041)
