= Sara Marielle Gaup Beaska =

Sámi singer and yoiker from Norway

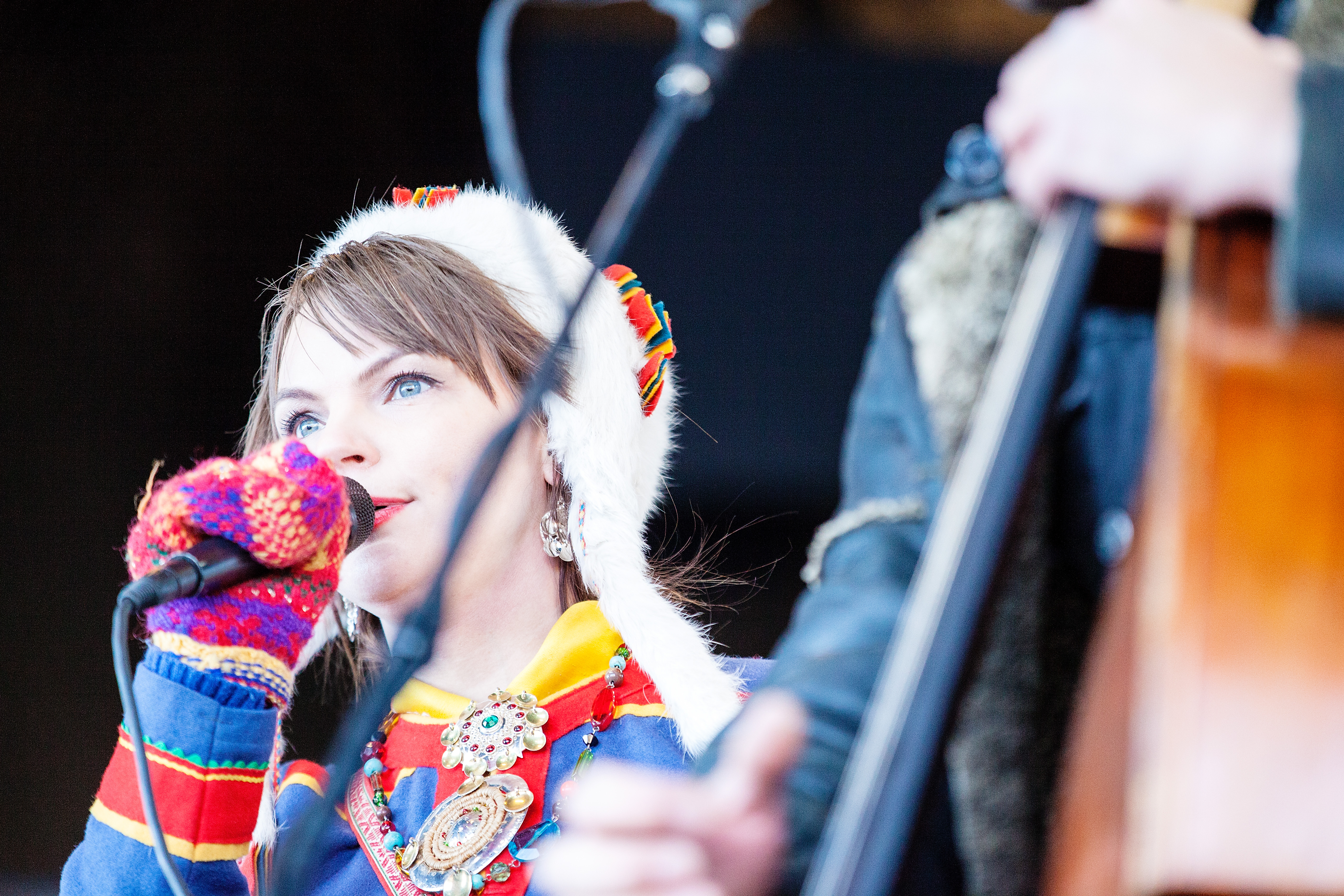
- Sara Marielle Gaup Beaska performing in 2017
- Born: Iŋgor Ántte Ánte Mihkkala Sara; March 21, 1983 (age 43); Kautokeino, Norway
- Occupations: Activist; musician; singer; yoiker

Sara Marielle Gaup Beaska (Northern Sami: Iŋgor Ántte Ánte Mihkkala Sara; born March 21, 1983) is a Sámi activist, musician, singer, and yoiker originally from Kautokeino Municipality. She performs both traditional yoiks and modern yoiks.

== Biography ==
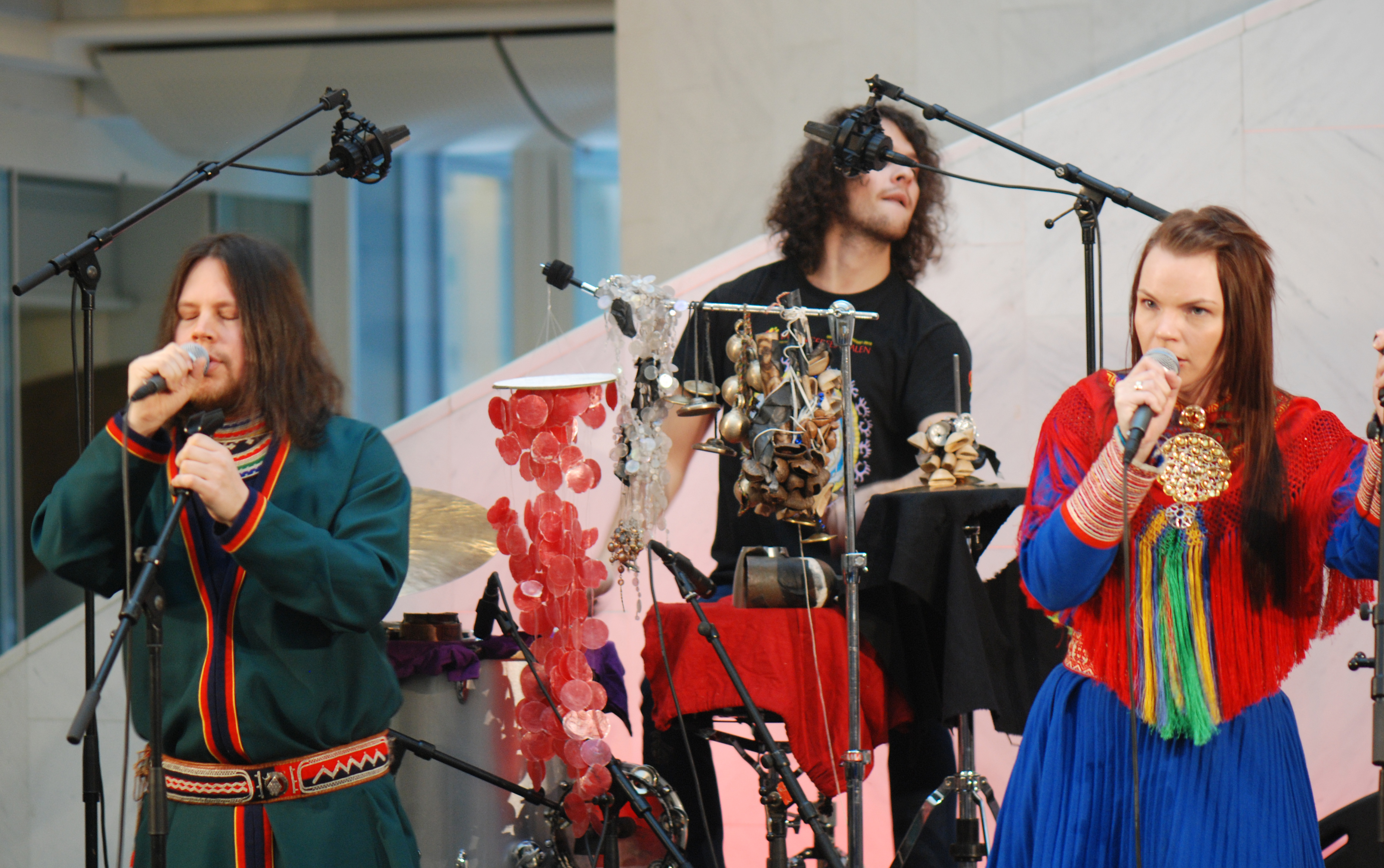
Adjágas on stage in 2012

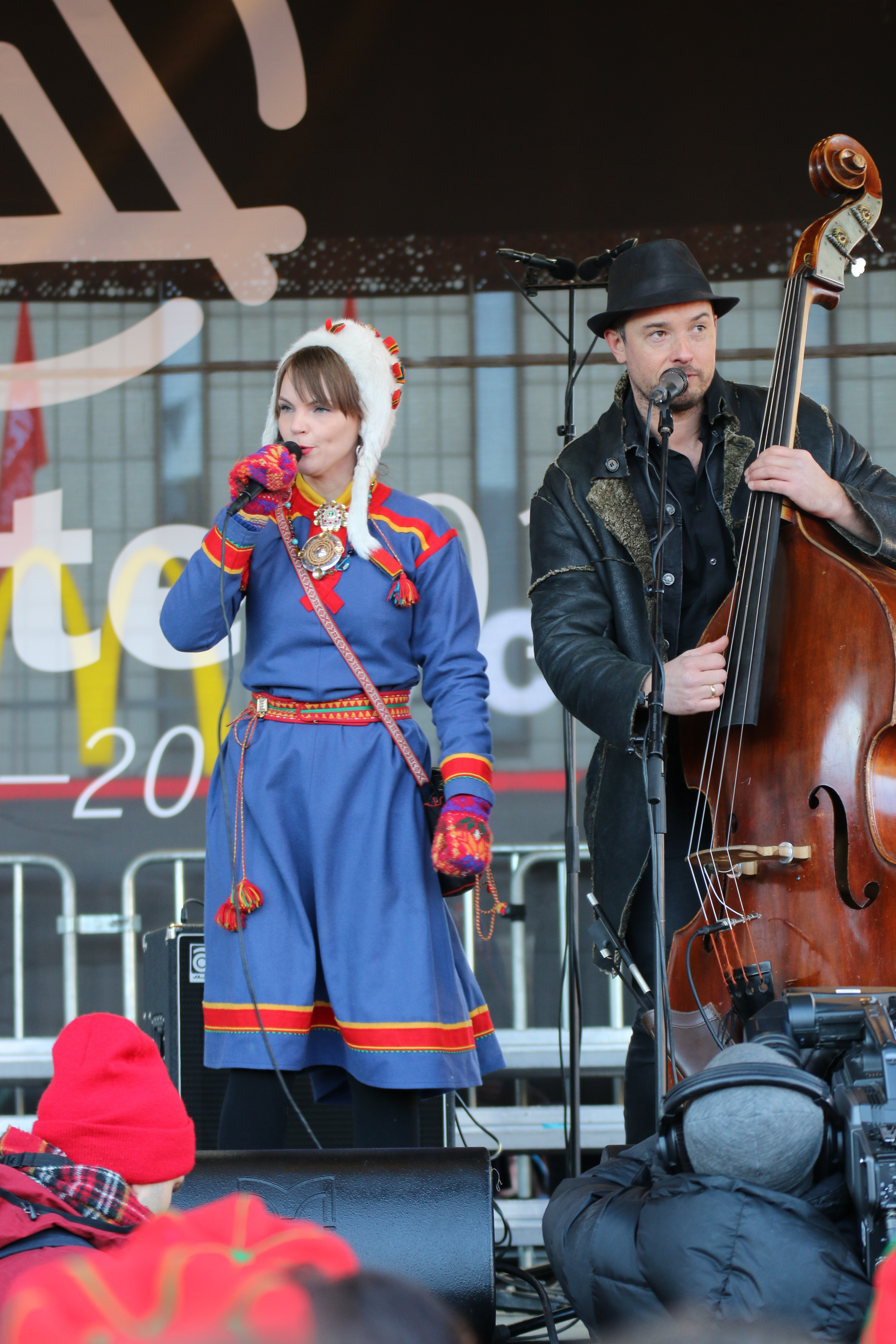
Sara Marielle Gaup Beaska and Steinar Raknes performing together as Arvvas in 2017

Iŋgor Ántte Ánte Mihkkala Sara (Norwegian: Sara Marielle Kvernmo Gaup) was born on March 21, 1983, into a musical family. Her father is the famous yoiker Ánte Mikkel Gaup. Her sisters Risten Anine Kvernmo Gaup and Inger Biret Kvernmo Gaup are also yoikers. Another sister, Lena Susanne Kvernmo Gaup, has also yoiked on recordings with them.

== Musical career ==
In 2004, Gaup participated in the yoik category of the Sámi Grand Prix with a yoik called Lena Sunná. John Mathis Utsi won the category; Gaup did not place in the top three.

The same year, she launched the band Adjágas with Láwra Somby. Both Gaup and Somby sang and yoicked in the band, which played on stages across the world, including as part of the lineup at Glastonbury in 2007. They disbanded in 2014.

At the same time that Adjágas ceased to exist, Gaup Beaska announced that she and Steinar Raknes had formed a new band called Arvvas.

In 2017, Gaup Beaska took part in the Norwegian TV series Muitte mu – Husk meg. On the show, she had to teach and coach the Swedish-Norwegian singer and winner of the 1985 Eurovision contest Elisabeth Andreassen to yoik.

== Awards and recognition ==
In 2002, Gaup was chosen to be Riddu Riđđu's Young Artist of the Year. In conjunction with the 2018 Sámi Grand Prix, she was awarded the Áillohaš Music Award.

== Discography ==
=== Adjágas ===
- 2005 – Adjágas
- 2009 – Mánu Rávdnji

=== Arvvas ===
- 2014 – Remembrance
- 2022 – Dás dál

=== Compilation albums ===
- 2003 – Sámi Grand Prix 2003, with the song Meahcce sykkel together with Jakumbé
- 2004 – Sámi Grand Prix 2004, with the song Lena Sunná
- 2017 – Music Without Borders, with the songs Nordafjells / Liti Kjersti and Guds Godhet

=== On other albums ===
- 2003 – Voices of Ice, 3 songs

Awards
| Preceded by Deatnogátte Nuorat | Recipient of the Áillohaš Music Award; 2018 | Succeeded by Domna Khomyuk |
