= Wimme Saari =

Saami yoiker and singer from Finland

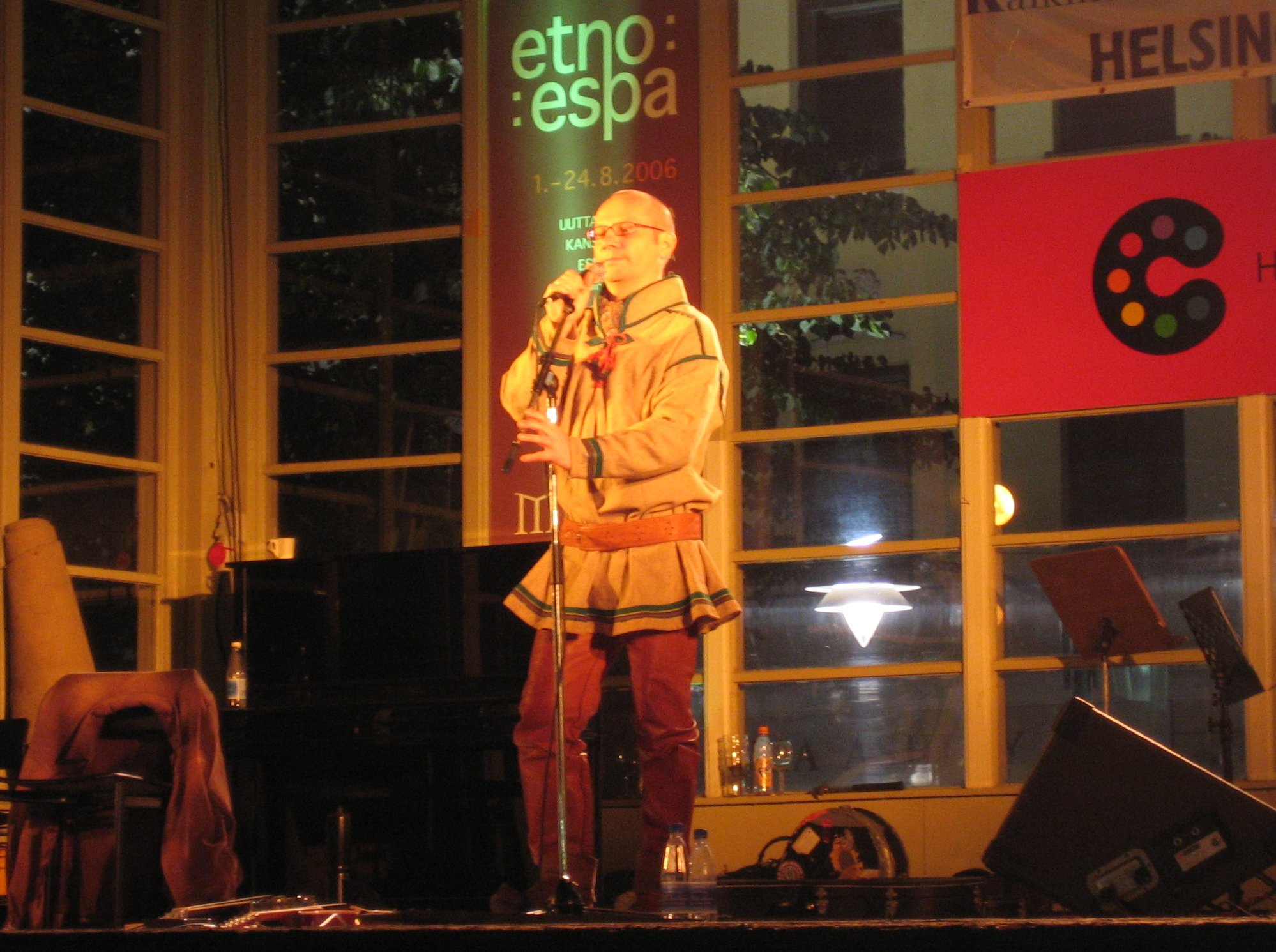
Wimme Saari on stage in the park on Esplanadi during Night of the Arts in Helsinki in 2006.

Wimme Saari (also known as Wimme; born 1959; Kelottijärvi, Enontekiö) is a Finnish Sami yoiker. Wimme Saari combines traditional Sami singing with his own improvisations, usually to a techno-ambient accompaniment by members of Finnish electronic group RinneRadio. Wimme has also appeared on the albums of other bands or musicians, for instance Hedningarna, Nits or Hector Zazou.

== Awards ==
In 1996, Wimme was awarded the Áillohaš Music Award, a Sámi music award conferred by Kautokeino Municipality and the Kautokeino Sámi Association to honor the significant contributions the recipient or recipients has made to the diverse world of Sámi music.

== Partial discography ==
=== Related Wimme Recordings ===
- RinneRadio – Joik Aani (1992)
- Hedningarna – Trä (1994)
- Hedningarna – Hippjokk (1997)
- Nits – alankomaat (1998)

=== Wimme recordings ===
- Wimme (1995)
- Gierran (1997)
- Cugu (2000)
- Bárru (2003)
- Gapmu / Instinct (2003) – (entirely a cappella)
- Mun (2009)

=== Also appears on ===
- Beginner's Guide to Scandinavia (3CD, Nascente 2011)

Awards
Preceded by Ole Larsen Gaino	Recipient of the Áillohaš Music Award; 1996	Succeeded by Roger Ludvigsen
