= Intrigue (band) =

Metal Band

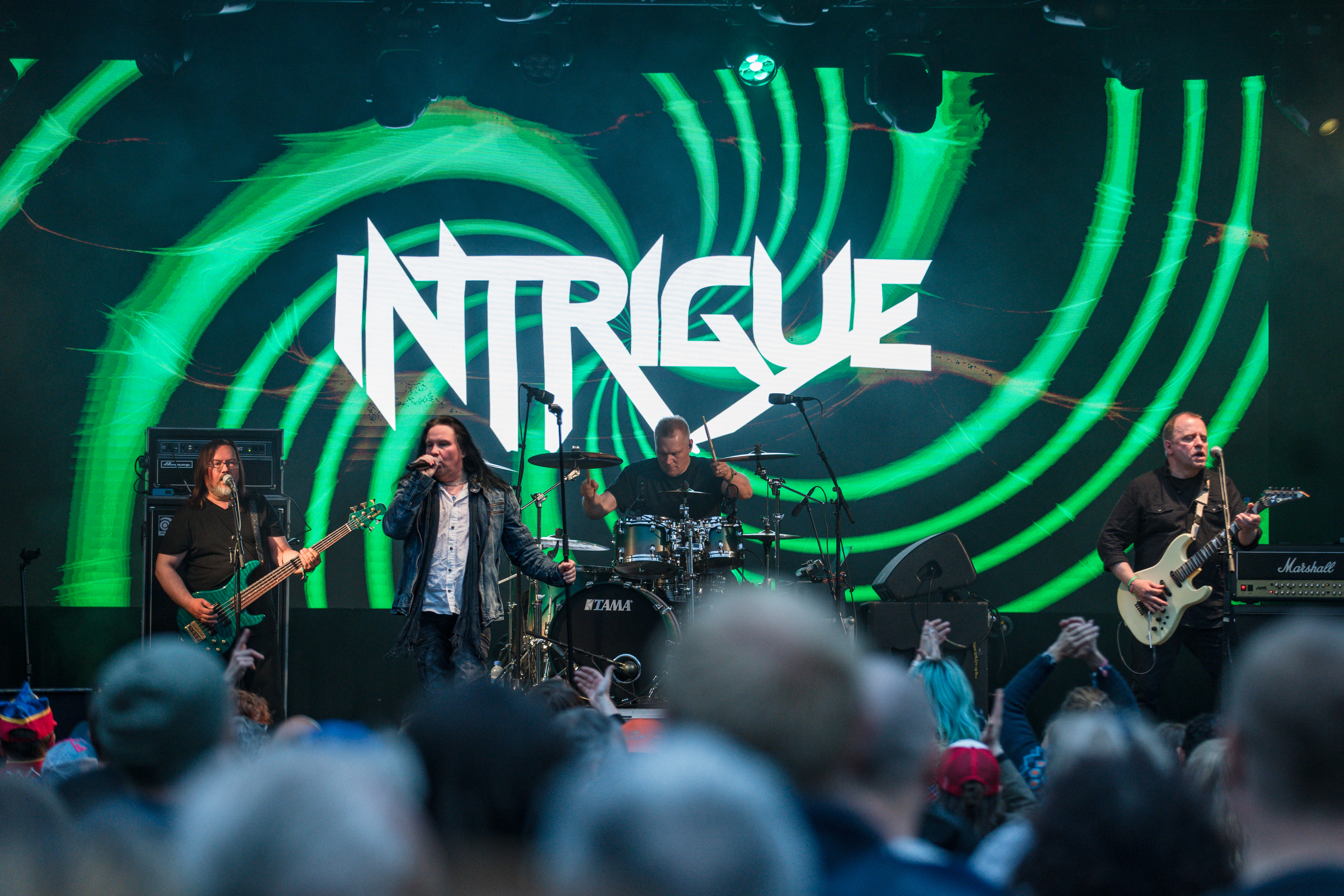
- Intrigue performing at Riddu Riđđu 2025 (Photo: John Sears)

Background information
- Origin: Karasjok, Norway
- Genres: Heavy metal
- Years active: 1989–present
- Labels: Luondu Music; iBoks

Intrigue is a Northern Saami heavy metal band from Karasjok Municipality, Norway. The band was formed in 1989 by lead songwriter and vocalist Kai Somby, guitarist Tore Skoglund, bass player Bengt Roger Kåven, guitarist Frank Rasmus and drummer Knut Skoglund.

== Awards ==
In 2003, Intrigue received the Áillohaš Music Award, a Sámi music award conferred by the Norwegian Sámi Association, Kautokeino Municipality, and the Kautokeino Sámi Association to honor the significant contributions the recipient or recipients has made to the diverse world of Sámi music. In 2009, the band received the Karasjok Cultural Prize.

== Discography ==
- Intrigue (1994)
- Heavyjoik (2002)
- Crossover (2003)
- Čappa nieida (2011)

== Members ==
- Øyvind Karlsen — drums
- Frank Rasmus — bass
- Tore Skoglund — guitar
- Geir Karikoski — guitar
- Kai Somby — vocals

== Former members ==
- Øystein Furuly — drums
- Steve Strømeng — keyboard
- Knut E. Bakkevold — guitar
- Knut Skoglund — drums
- Bengt Roger Kåven — bass
- Ove Skollevoll — bass

Awards
Preceded by Frode Fjellheim	Recipient of the Áillohaš Music Award; 2003	Succeeded by Anders P. Bongo
