= Johan Sara =

Johan Sara Jóret Juhána Juhána Juhán
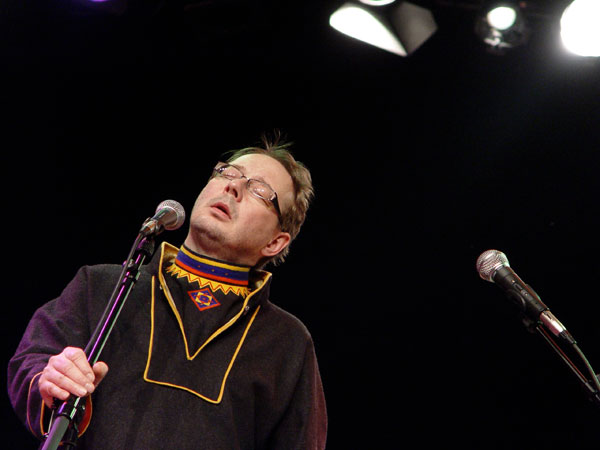
- Sara in Aarhus, Denmark

Background information
- Born: 1963 (age 62–63); Alta
- Origin: Norway
- Genres: Yoik, electronica, jazz
- Occupations: Musician, songwriter, record producer
- Instruments: Guitar, percussion, vocals
- Label: DAT
- Website: www.johansara.com

Johan Sara Jr. (Northern Sami: Jóret Juhána Juhána Juhán) born 1963 is a Sami musician (guitar and yoik) and a central Sami composer, producer, teacher, arranger, actor and performer of contemporary music with roots in the Sami tradition.

== Career ==
Sara Jr. was born and raised in Alta Municipality in Finnmark county, Norway. He studied classical guitar at the Music Conservatory in Tromsø, as well as music pedagogics. He taught music at the Diehtosiida Sami University College in Kautokeino. Sara Jr. is the leader of Johan Sara Jr. Group, who released Ovcci vuomi ovtta veaiggis (1995). With a new line up (Geir Lysne wind instruments, Knut Aalefjær drums, Erik Halvorsen keyboards) came the release Boska (2003), with a musical expression described as punk-joik-jazz. The next album is called Orvoš (2009) with the J. S. Jr. Group.

The orchestra has toured internationally. In 2010 he visited Japan, where he played in Osaka and Tokyo, and held a total of four concerts. In the summer of 2011 he played the Roskilde Festival with, among others, Terje Johannessen.

The same year he was awarded the Edvard Prize 2011, from TONO, for the album Transmission – Rievdadus in open class under Ultima Oslo Contemporary Music Festival. The Jury Rationale states "soundscape of natural sounds, voices, breathing and occasional heavy rhythms fuse into exciting music. It is unpredictable, Johan Sara Jr invites us on a journey, and we want to follow. From the minimalist to the great epic, all rooted in something we can all recognize ourselves in – namely, our roots."

Sara Jr. has also written music for radio and theater, most recently for the Hålogaland Teater (Idag og i morgen, 2005).

== Awards and honors ==
In 2001, Sara received the Áillohaš Music Award, a Sámi music award conferred by Kautokeino Municipality and the Kautokeino Sámi Association to honor the significant contributions the recipient or recipients has made to the diverse world of Sámi music.

In 2010, he won the Edvard-prisen in the open class category for his album Transmission – Rievdadus.

== Discography ==
=== As band leader ===
As Johan Sara Jr. & Group

- 1995: Ovcci vuomi ovtta veaiggis (Nine valleys in one twilight) (DAT)
- 2003: Boska (DAT)
- 2009: Orvos (DAT)

=== Other projects ===
- 1999: Calbmeliiba (Frozen Moments) (DAT), with Erik Steen, Inga Juuso, Jai Shankar Sahajpal, Rogelio De Badajoz Duran
- 2000: När vindarna viskar mitt namn (When Spirits are calling my name), with Roger Pontare, the swedish entry in Eurovision Song Contest 2000.
- 2008: Mino Mano (Stierdna), in Turkey
- 2009: Ludiin Muitalan (Telling with Yoik) (DAT), with Ole Larsen Gaino
- 2010: Transmission – Rievdad (DAT)
- 2026: "I am Ice" - Enslaved

Awards
Preceded by Sančuari	Recipient of the Áillohaš Music Award; 2001	Succeeded by Frode Fjellheim
Preceded by Nils Petter Molvær	Recipient of the "Open class" Edvardprisen; 2011	Succeeded by Kjell Samkopf
