= Ingor Ánte Áilo Gaup =

Norwegian Sami musician

Iŋgor Ántte Áilu Gaup
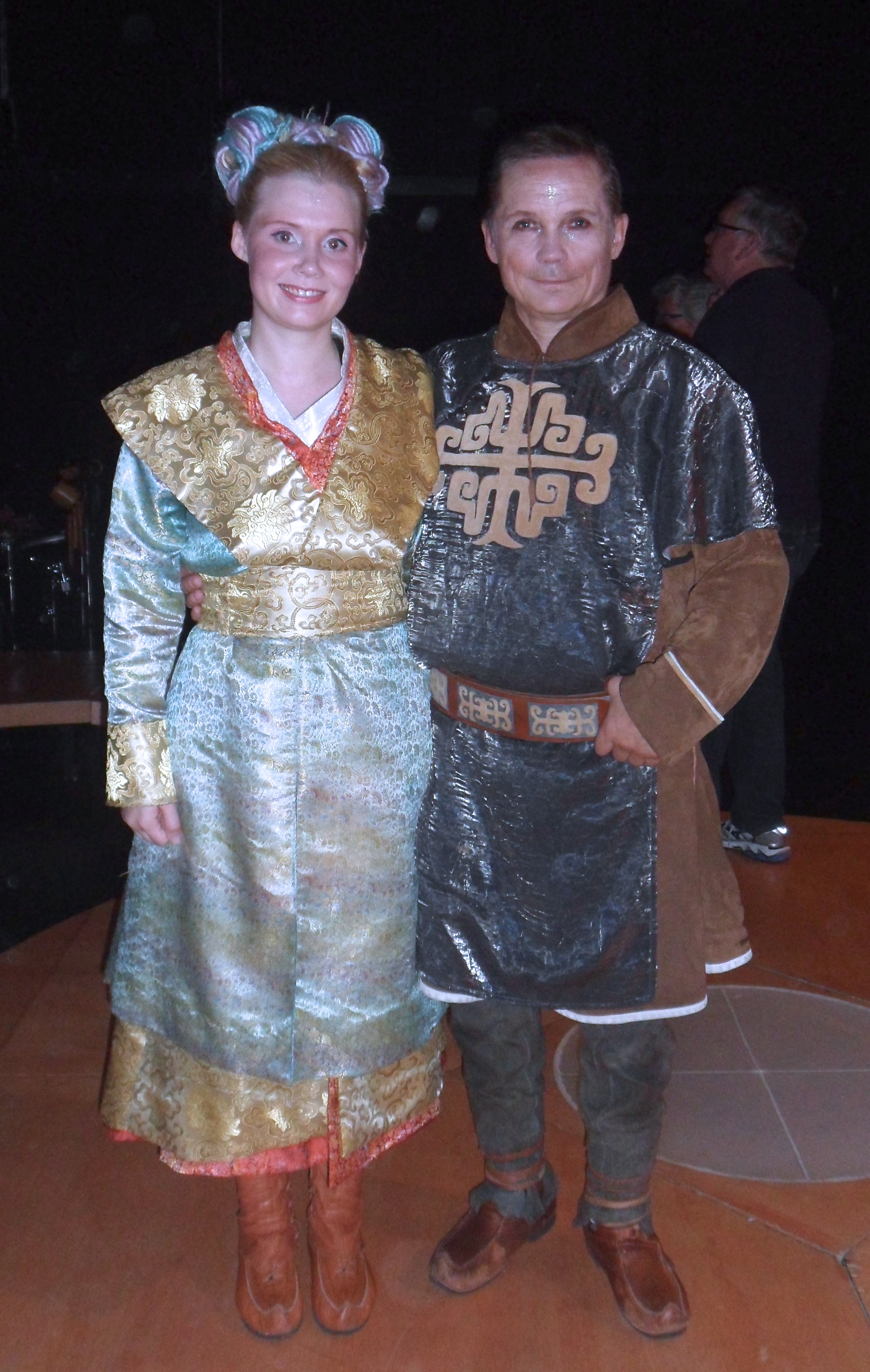
- Inga-Máret Gaup-Juuso and Ingor Ánte Áilo Gaup in Helsinki, Finland after a performance of Nils-Aslak Valkeapää's The Frost Haired and The Dream-seer on September 6th, 2013

Background information
- Born: 25 March 1960 (age 66); Kautokeino, Norway
- Origin: Norway Sami
- Genres: Yoik & traditional folk music
- Occupations: Actor, musician, composer & teacher
- Instrument: Vocals
- Website: Ivnniiguin on MySpace

Ingor Antte Ailu Gaup, or in correct Sámi spelling: Iŋgor Ántte Áilu Gaup, artist-name Ailloš (born 25 March 1960 in Kautokeino, Norway) is a Sámi actor, composer, and folk musician. He is the brother of professor and politician Ole Henrik Magga and visual artist Josef Halse.

== Career ==
Gaup was an early part of the rock group Ivnniiguin, which, among other things, created arrangements of poems by Ailo Gaup, whose work, the musical Våre vidder II, was presented at the Kautokeino Theater and at cultural festivals in Nord-Norge. This piqued an interest in theater, which led to the establishment of SNTB, or "Beaivváš Sámi National Theater", which he has been part of since 1983.

He has also had roles in Norwegian film and television, such as the film Pathfinder, the series Brødrene Dal og legenden om Atlant-is (1994), and has also contributed to such musical publications as Jan Garbarek's I Took Up the Runes (1990). Together with Nils-Aslak Valkeapää, he released Sápmi lottážan (1993). Since 1993, he has been part of accordionist Gabriel Fliflet's group Fri Flyt, which has toured the country together with Knut Reiersrud in the jazz joik performance Saman i gaman. One of his joiks features in the German book Johan Turi. Ein Bühnenstück mit einem Joik von Áilloš by Harald Gaski and Gunnar H. Gjengset (Samica, 2019 ISBN 978-3-9816835-4-7).

He has been part of the dance and joik performance Jasat with the Sami theater in Kiruna and the Åarjelhsaemien Teatere. Gaup received the Nordlys award in 2003, and participated in the Nordlys Festival in 2004 with singer Solveig Kringlebotn. Together with Kristin Mellem, he released Jeđđehus (2004), which was nominated for the Edvardprisen in (2005). His newest album includes the musicians Svein Schultz, Kenneth Ekornes, and Stein Austrud.

== Awards ==
In 1999, Gaup received the Áillohaš Music Award, a Sámi music award conferred by Kautokeino Municipality and the Kautokeino Sámi Association to honor the significant contributions the recipient or recipients has made to the diverse world of Sámi music.

In 2003, he won the Nordlysprisen.

Awards
| Preceded by Inga Juuso | Recipient of the Áillohaš Music Award; 1999 | Succeeded by Sančuari |
| Preceded by Knut Erik Sundquist | Recipient of the Nordlysprisen; 2006 | Succeeded by Ola Bremnes |
