= Roger Ludvigsen =

- Born: 28 July 1965 (age 61)
- Origin: Norway
- Occupations: Musician, composer, percussionist
- Instrument: Guitar
- Years active: 1976–

Roger Ludvigsen (born 28 July 1965 in Alta Municipality) is a Sami guitarist, percussionist, and composer living in Kautokeino Municipality.

== Biography ==
In the 1970s, he was part of Ivnniiguin, the first Sami-language rock band. In 1981, he worked on the music production for the play Min duoddarat – Våre vidder, which was the first work to be performed at the Beaivváš Sámi Theatre.

Together with Leif Isak Eide Nilut and Bjørn Ole Rasch, he launched in 1991 the Sami group Orbina, who released the albums Orbina (1993) and Orbina II (2001).

He has played and recorded with a range of famous artists, both on record and in concert, including Mari Boine (Gula Gula from 1989 and Eight Seasons from 2002), Steinar Albrigtsen (Stripped from 2001), Nils Petter Molvær (Khmer from 1998), Sidsel Endresen and Lynni Treekrem.

== Awards and honors ==
In 1997, Ludvigsen received the Áillohaš Music Award, a Sámi music award conferred by Kautokeino Municipality and the Kautokeino Sámi Association to honor the significant contributions the recipient or recipients has made to the diverse world of Sámi music.

In 2002, he won the Edvardprisen in the musical drama class for the music he composed for the play Ayra-Leena performed by Beaivvás Sámi Teáhter. As part of the prize, he received 40,000 Norwegian crowns, a diploma, and a unique stone trophy designed by Bruno Oldani.

In 2005, Ludvigsen was selected to be the year's festival artist for the Arctic Arts Festival in Harstad, Norway. At the festival, he performed a commissioned piece with 9 other artists.

In 2019, Ludvigsen was awarded the Nordlysprisen for his extensive and groundbreaking contributions to both Sámi and Norwegian music over the decades. For example, he founded the first Norwegian-Sámi rock band, Unicorn, whose name was later changed to Ivnniiguin, with other teenagers from Kautokeino. This band went on to become hugely popular throughout Sápmi and is still a popular addition to NRK Radio's Sámi playlists.

== Film composer ==
List of films on which Roger Ludvigsen has produced music.

- Høstens første bilde (1993)
- Bulle bor ikke her (2002)
- Solens sønn og månens datter (1993)
- Johannas jul (2000)
- Eagle's Nest (2001)
- Urkraften fra vidda (2003)
- Holbbit Libaidit (2003)
- Ole Henrik Magga (2003)
- Kautokeino-opprøret (2007)
- Barentsfashion Dokumentar (2008)

Awards
Preceded by Wimme Saari	Recipient of the Áillohaš Music Award; 1997	Succeeded by Inga Juuso
