= Frode Fjellheim =

Southern Saami yoiker and musician from Norway

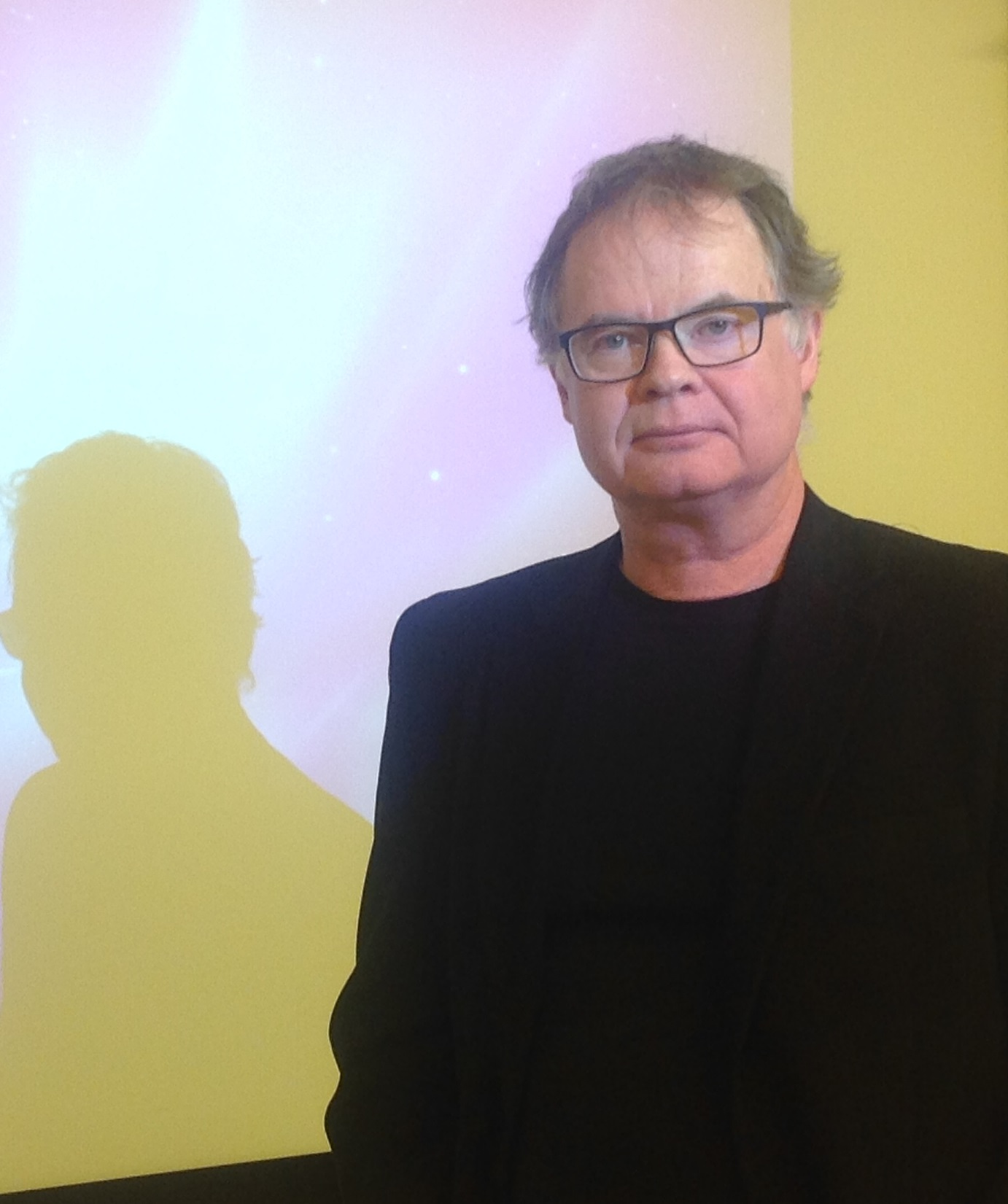
- Fjellheim in 2014.

Background information
- Born: 27 August 1959 (age 67); Mosjøen, Nordland, Norway
- Genres: Jazz, World, Ambient
- Occupations: Musician, composer
- Instruments: Piano, keyboards, yoik
- Label: Vuelie
- Website: www.vuelie.no

Frode Fjellheim (born 27 August 1959 in Mussere) is a Southern Saami yoiker and musician (piano and synthesizer) from Norway. He is best known for his band Transjoik and as the composer of the 2002 song "Eatnemen Vuelie", which was later adapted to become the opening musical number of Frozen. Fjellheim was raised in Gausdal Municipality and Karasjok Municipality, and is South Sámi.

== Career ==
Fjellheim was educated at the Classical program at Trøndelag Musikkonservatorium (1980–84). He lives in Trondheim, where he is a freelance musician and composer. He has been involved in productions at Trøndelag Teater and Rikskonsertene. Among his commissioned compositions are, Sørsamar rundt Hardangervidda (Telemarkfestivalen 2003), Aejlies Gaaltije - The sacred Source (Festspillene i Nord-Norge 2000), and Àhkunjárga or Tøtta sitt ness (Vinterfestuka in Narvik 2006) Since 1997, he has also composed film scores for NRK and several short films. During the 1990s, he headed his namesake band Jazz Joik Ensemble, which later became Transjoik. Fjellheim was also a member of Tango Concertino. Mari Boine, Ulla Pirttijärvi, Katarina Barruk, Anne Vada, Hildegunn Øiseth, Iren Reppen, Ella Holm Bull and Tone Hulbækmo are some of the other artists that Fjellheim has worked with. Fjellheim also heads his own music company called Vuelie, which publishes books, sheet music and CDs by a number of artists.

In 2004 he released the album Aejlies Gaaltije which contains the mass Arktisk Messe, commissioned by Festspillene in Harstad in 2000. Fjellheim has also written a book called Joik for kor ("Yoik for choirs") and a textbook on music rooted in joik.

Fjellheim wrote the opening song "Vuelie" for Frozen, which was based on yoiking. The song is a slightly altered version of "Eatnemen Vuelie" ("Song of the Earth"), which was originally written in 1996. The film version is shorter and lacks the elements of the Christian hymn "Fairest Lord Jesus", which is an essential part of the version from 1996. Fjellheim has subsequently received praise from the Norwegian Sámi President for spreading yoik to new audiences.

Fjellheim holds a professorate at Nord Universitet.

== Awards and honors ==
In 2002, Fjellheim was awarded the Áillohaš Music Award, a Sámi music award conferred by Kautokeino Municipality and the Kautokeino Sámi Association to honor the significant contributions the recipient or recipients has made to the diverse world of Sámi music.

In addition to the Áillohaš Music Award, he has also received the following awards and honors:

- 3-year grant by the Norwegian Government (1993–1996).
- Spellemannprisen 2004 open class for Aejlies Gaaltiie — the Sacred Source
- Sør-Trøndelag County Cultural Award, 2007
- Liv Ullmann prisen, 2015
- Hillmarprisen, 2015
- Gammlengprisen open class, 2016

== Books ==
- 2002: Joik For Kor (Vuelie)
- 2004: Med Joik Som Utgangspunkt (Vuelie)

== Discography ==
=== Solo albums ===
- 1991: Sangen Vi Glemte — Mijjen Vuelieh (Iđut)
- 2004: Aejlies Gaaltije — The Sacred Source (Vuelie)
- 2013: Biejjien vuelie - Solkvad (Vuelie)

With Frode Fjellheim's Jazz Joik Ensemble - Transjoik

- 1994: Saajve Dans (Iđut)
- 1998: Mahkalahke (Atrium)
- 2001: Meavraa (Atrium)
- 2004: Uja Nami (Vuelie)
- 2005: Bewafá (Vuelie), with Sher Miandad Khan

=== Collaborations ===
- 2008: Áibbašeabmi (Vuelie) - with Ulla Pirttijärvi
- 2011: Bálggis (Vuelie) - with Bárut
- 2013: Gilvve Gollát – Sow your Gold (Universal) - with Mari Boine and KORK
- 2015: As I Walk (Vuelie) - with Anne Vada
- 2015: Spes (2L) - with Cantus
- 2024: Allaq - with Cecilia Persson

Awards
Preceded by Niko Valkeapää	Recipient of the Open class Spellemannprisen; 2004	Succeeded by Nils Petter Molvær
Preceded by Johan Sara jr.	Recipient of the Áillohaš Music Award; 2002	Succeeded by Intrigue
Preceded by Trio Medieval	Recipient of the Open class Gammlengprisen; 2016	Succeeded by -
