= Maj-Lis Skaltje =

- Born: Majlis Ingegerd Skaltje; September 19, 1940 (age 86); Báste, near Gällivare, Sweden
- Education: Uppsala University; Academy of Fine Arts, Helsinki; University of Oslo; University of Oulu
- Occupations: Journalist; writer; artist
- Spouse: Per Blind
- Awards: Johan Nordlander Society cultural prize (2012); Ubmejen Biejvieh Honorary Award (2014); Sami Council of the Church of Sweden cultural scholarship (2015); Swedish Sami Federation honorary award (2016); Áillohaš Award (2023)

Majlis ( Maj-Lis ) Ingegerd Skaltje (born 1940) is a Sámi journalist, writer, and artist. She is noted for making the Sámi cultural tradition of the yoik visible in book and film form.

== Early life and career ==
Skaltje was born on 19 September, 1940 in the Báste Sámi village near Harra northwest of Gallivare. Her father John Skaltje was a reindeer herder. Skaltje went to school in the then named nomad school of Sweden, separated from her parents for semesters and being taught in Swedish. She graduated in social sciences and gained an MA in political science from Uppsala University. She then worked for Swedish radio being the first Sami-language radio journalist in Sweden. From 1966 she edited programmes for the newly instituted Sámi radio. She went on to become a television producer. She has also been a staff member at the Nordic Sámi Institute at the Sámi University in Kautokeino. Becoming an artist she studied painting for four years at the Academy of Fine Arts in Helsinki as well as Sámi culture at the University of Oslo and the University of Oulu.

Although she herself has never yoiked, Skaltje documented yoiks throughout the 1990s by interviewing older Sámi people in a project initiated by the Swedish Sámi National Association. In 2005, the work was described in a book about yoiks in northern Sámi. Skaltje has also had a joik dedicated to her. With her name as the title, it was sung and recorded in 2007 by yoiker Inga Juuso and can be heard on the CD Skáidi - Where the rivers meet.

== Awards ==
In 2012, Skaltje received the Johan Nordlander Society cultural prize for her “dedicated and intensive work to demonstrate the central importance of Sami culture in the northern space". In 2014, she won the Ubmejen Biejvieh Honorary Award. In 2015, she gained the Sami Council of the Church of Sweden's cultural scholarship. In 2016, she was awarded the Swedish Sami Federation's (SSR) honorary award for “having documented and made visible the joik, one of the important cultural carriers of Sami culture, with great patience and sensitivity.” In 2023, Skalje was awarded the Sami music Áillohaš Award, for her commitment to making the yoik visible.

== Personal life ==
Skaltje is married to the craftsman and reindeer owner Per (Järva-Per) Blind. They live in Puolsain in the municipality of Kiruna.

== Selected publications ==
- Bereniken Hiukset or Berenice's hair : in search of northern women artist's identity. A project presented by Royal Melbourne Institute of Technology, Melbourne University and the Embassy of Finland in Australia.
- Maj-Lis Skaltje: Luondu juoiggaha (Nature makes me yoik), 2005, ISBN 82-90625-50-2.
- Skaltje Maj Lis (2014) Minsta lilla liv har sin jojk [The smallest of lives has its yoik]

== Selected filmography ==
- Jojk Juoigan, a documentary about the vitality of this form of Sámi musical culture (2013)
- Documentary film about Johan Turi (2005)
