= Ulla Pirttijärvi-Länsman =

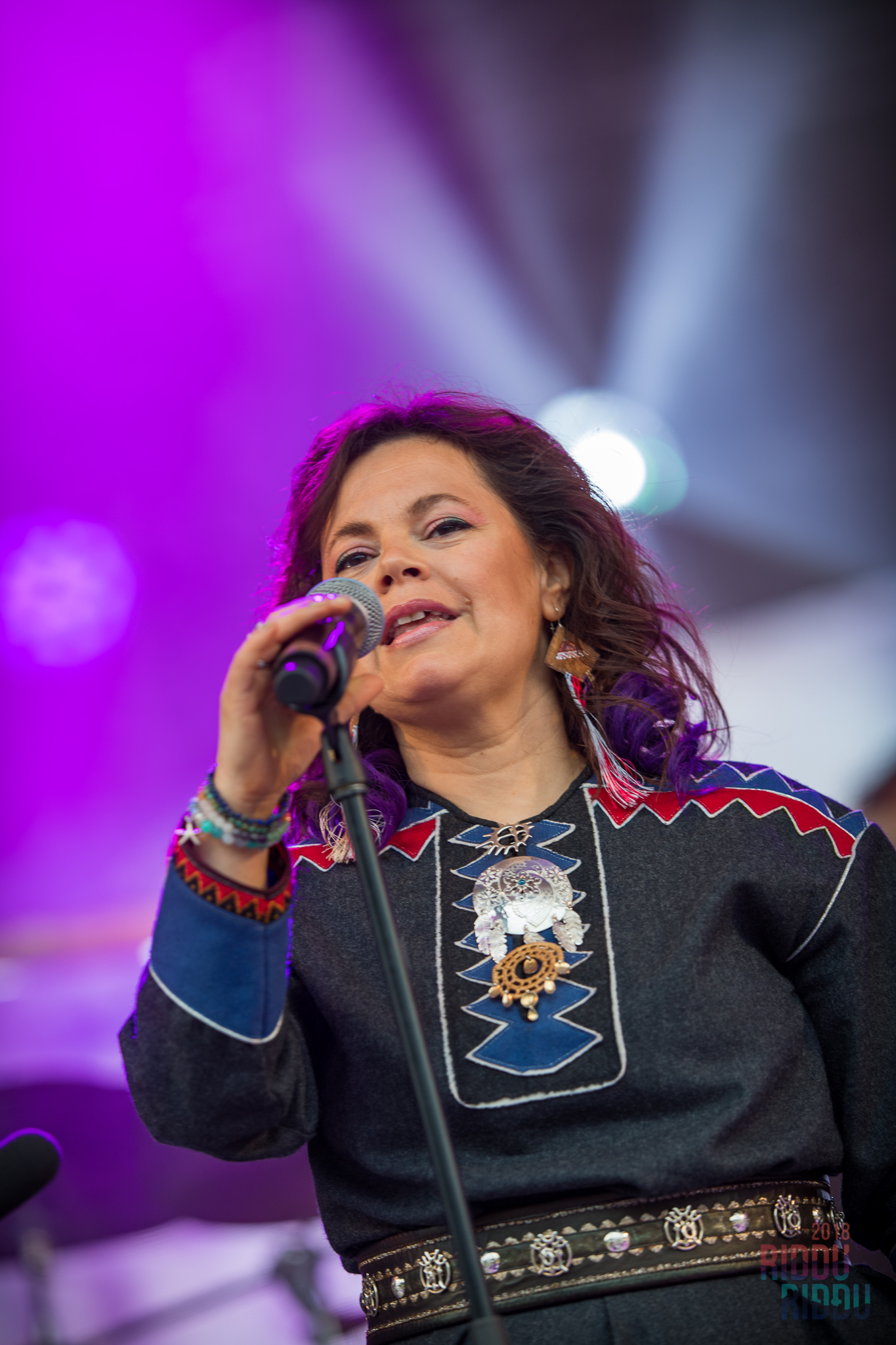
- Pirttijärvi-Länsman singing with the group Solju at Riddu Riđđu 2018

Background information
- Born: 13 November 1971 (age 54); Angeli, Finland
- Genres: Yoik, contemporary folk
- Occupation: Musician
- Instrument: Vocalist

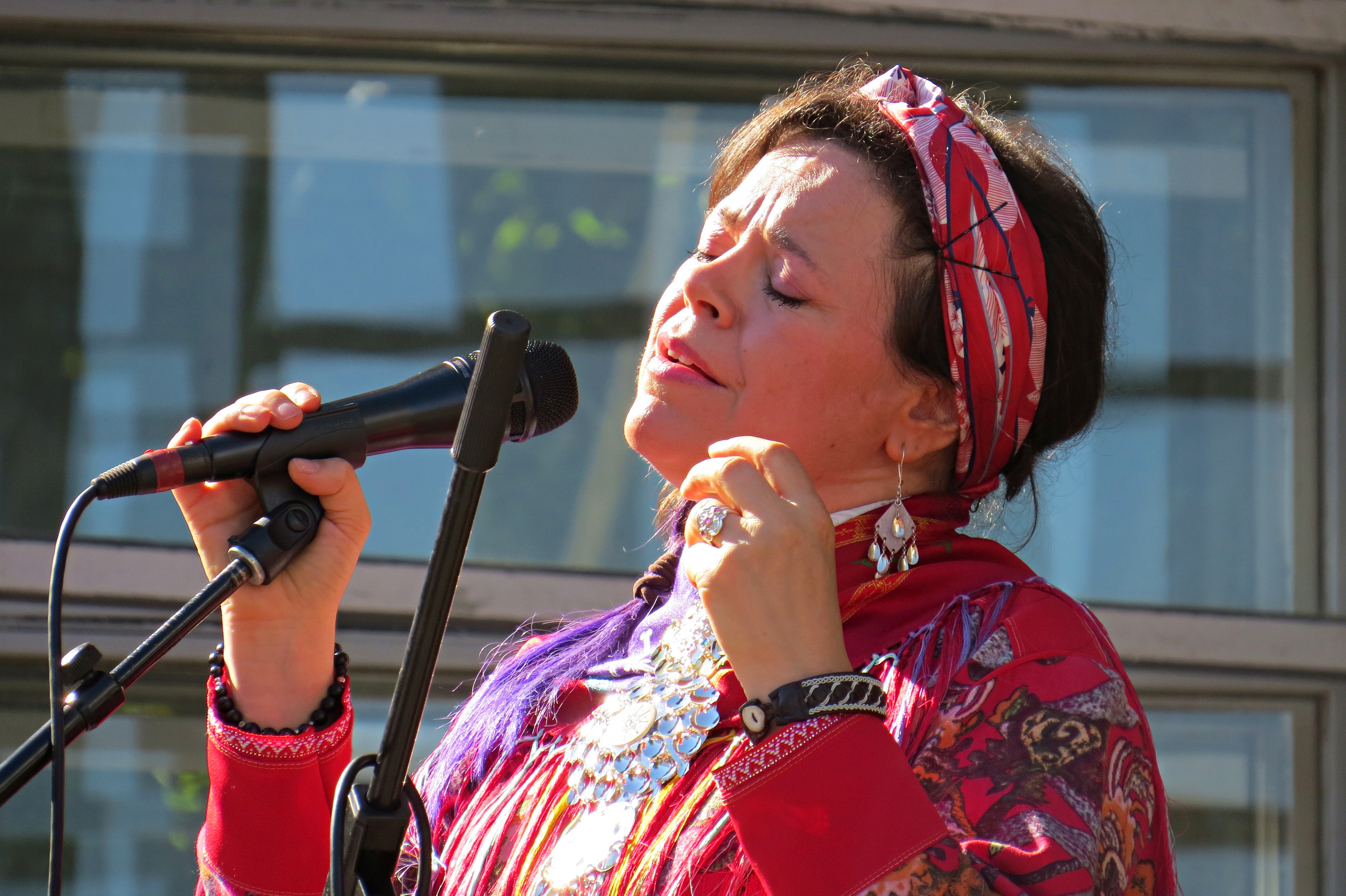
Ulla Pirttijärvi performing with Ulda at the Etno-Espa music festival in Helsinki, Finland on August 1, 2022

Ulla Pirttijärvi-Länsman is a Sami joik singer from the village of Angeli (Sami: Aŋŋel), Finland. She began her career with the music group Angelin Tytöt, but left soon after to pursue a solo career. She performs traditional joik music with Western arrangements of contemporary instruments.

== Biography ==
Ulla Pirttijärvi was raised with joik music and chanting. As a young child, she listened to her mother and uncle sing stories to her, and she chanted along; by age ten she was singing on her own. She then started performing in public with a group of young girls who called themselves Angelin Tytöt.

Pirttijärvi is very involved promoting Sami culture and Sami self-rule. In 1996, she wrote a music book called Hoŋkoŋ dohkká, which won the cultural prize given by the Saami Council, and composed and produced an accompanying album full of songs aimed at children to teach them the Sami language and the Sami world experience.

Pirttijärvi lives with her daughter Hilda and her son Nilla-Ande in Utsjoki. In 2014, Ulla and her daughter Hildá Länsman created the band Solju and in 2015 they participated in Finland's Uuden Musiikin Kilpailu with the song "Hold Your Colours". Her husband Jari passed away in the summer of 2017.

== Awards ==
In 2007, Pirttijärvi-Länsman received the Áillohaš Music Award, a Sámi music award conferred by Kautokeino Municipality and the Kautokeino Sámi Association to honor the significant contributions the recipient or recipients has made to the diverse world of Sámi music.

== Discography ==
- Hoŋkoŋ dohkká (1996)
- Ruošša eanan (1998)
- Máttaráhku askái (2002)
- Áibbašeabmi (2008)
- Ulda (2012)
- Roijk (2016)
- Ođđa áigodat (2018)
- Vulleš Heaika (2019) (single)
- Áššu (2019)

Awards
Preceded by Dimitri joavku	Recipient of the Áillohaš Music Award; 2007	Succeeded by Svein Schultz
