= Nils-Aslak Valkeapää =

Sámi writer, musician and artist (1943–2001)

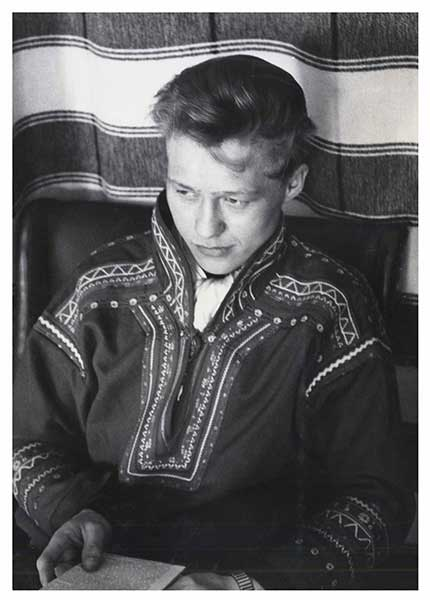
- Born: 23 March 1943; Enontekiö, Finland
- Died: 26 November 2001 (aged 58); Espoo, Finland Norwegian
- Other names: Áillohaš, Áilu
- Occupations: Writer, musician, artist

Nils-Aslak Valkeapää, known as Áilu in the Northern Sámi language and with the stage name of Áillohaš (23 March 1943 – 26 November 2001), was a Finnish Sámi writer, musician and artist. He was one of the most internationally recognised contributors of Sámi culture. He was mostly known for his joiks and poems. He was the official provincial artist of Lapland from 1978 to 1983. He was given the Nordic Council Literature Prize in 1991 for his work called Beaivi, áhčážan (engl. The Sun, My Father).

== Early life ==
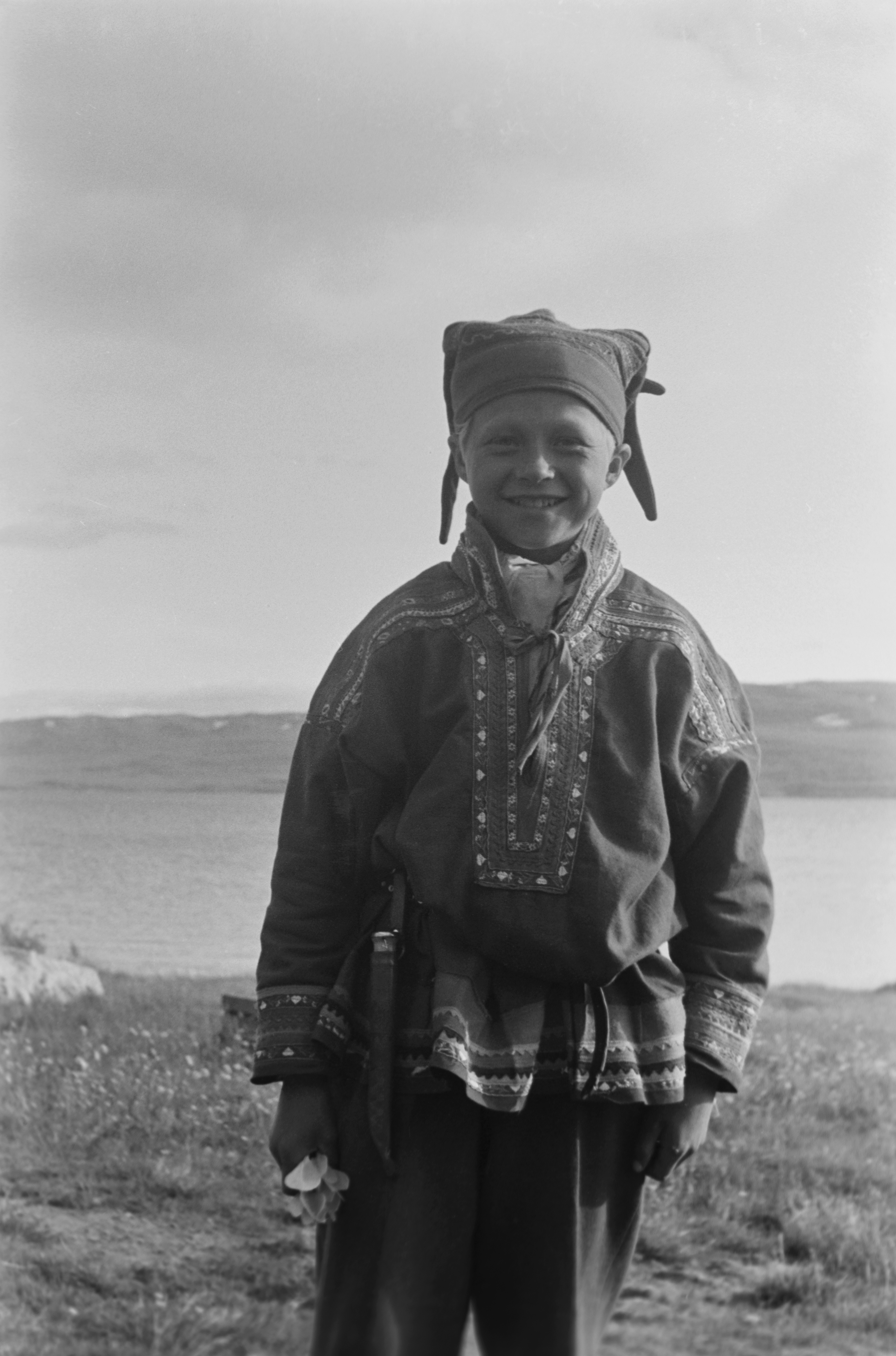
Valkeapää, age twelve, in July 1955

Valkeapää was born on March 24, 1943, in Enontekiö in Finnish Sápmi to a family of nomadic Sámi reindeer herders. His father, Johannes J. Valkeapää, was Finnish Sámi from the Kaaresuvanto area, while his mother, Ellen Susanna Aslaksdatter Bals, was Norwegian Sámi from Uløya in Troms. Valkeapää lived in Finnish Sápmi until his father's death, when his family moved to Skibotn in Norwegian Sápmi.

Valkeapää's mother tongue was Northern Sámi. However, like many Sámi children in the 1950s, he did not have access to formal education in his native language and did not learn how to write in Northern Sámi until adulthood. Along with his early education in boarding schools, Valkeapää spent six years studying at the Kemijärvi Teachers' Training College, though he never worked as a teacher.

== Career ==
=== Music ===
Valkeapää first came into the public eye as a performer of traditional Sámi joik and was central to the revitalisation of the genre. His debut record, Joikuja, was released in 1968. In 1973, folk and jazz musicians Seppo Paakkunainen, Ilpo Saastamoinen and Esko Rosnell invited Valkeapää on a musicians' retreat. During the retreat, Valkeapää was inspired by Dvořák's Symphony No. 9 and its African-American spiritual influences to develop fusion joik. In collaboration with Paakkunainen, he developed Juoigansinfonija, a jazz-joik symphony. In 1978, Valkeapää released his jazz-joik record Sámiid eatnan duoddariid. Valkeapää's music was somewhat controversial in Finland, both for his unorthodoxic inclusion of jazz elements and because Laestadian Sámi often viewed joik as immoral. Valkeapää continued to perform jazz-joik and resisted efforts to "preserve" the traditional form, stating in his book Terveisiä Lapista: "When I hear talk of conserving the culture, I see an investigator of folklore in my mind’s eye, and interpret their activities quite literally: cataloguing a dead culture."

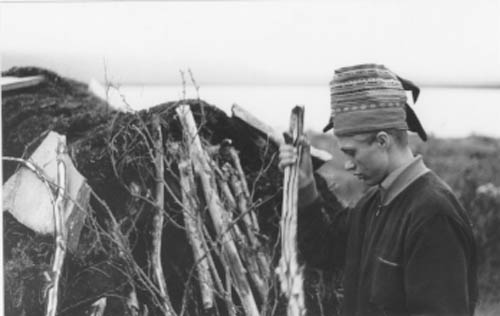
Nils-Aslak Valkeapää, age 21, on the peat bogs of Unkkajärvi (Uŋggájávri) in the Lapland village of Kaijuka, Enontekiö, 10 August 1964

Valkeapää released thirteen records from 1968 to 1994. His song Goase Dušše (The Bird Symphony), composed of nature sounds from the Sápmi region, received the jury’s special prize at the Prix Italia radio competition in 1993. Valkeapää also composed the music for and acted in the Oscar-nominated 1987 film Ofelaš. A recording of Valkeapää performing the theme for the film Ofelaš was sampled by British musician Mike Oldfield in "Prayer for the Earth," a track on his 1994 album The Songs of Distant Earth.

Valkeapää received further international recognition as a musician when he performed at the opening ceremony of the 1994 Winter Olympic Games in Lillehammer, Norway.

=== Writing ===
Valkeapää's first book, Terveisiä Lapista (Greetings from Lapland), was published by Otava in 1971 and acted as a political pamphlet and treatise on the issues impacting Sámi people, including condemnations of boarding schools designed for assimilation and land acquisition policies. The book was written in Finnish, and was the second-ever book by a Sámi author to be translated into English.

Valkeapää's debut book of poetry, Giđa ijat čuovgadat (Spring Nights So Bright), was self-published in Oulu in 1974. A Finnish translation by Anneli Rosell, Kevään yöt niin valoisat, was published in 1980 with illustrations by Valkeapää. From 1974 to 2001, he published nine books of poetry, all written in Northern Sámi. Only two of his books were ever translated into Finnish - his debut and his 1988 collection Beaivi, Áhcázan (The Sun, My Father). Beaivi, Áhcázan was awarded the Nordic Council Literature Prize in 1991.

Along with his poetry and nonfiction, Valkeapää also wrote a Noh play that was performed in Japan in 1995. The play was first performed in Sámi at the Beaivváš Sámi Našunálateáhter as Ridn’oaivi ja Nieguid Oaidni (The Frost-haired and the Dream-seer) in 2007. In 1981, he was the editor-in-chief of the publication Aiti.

In 1984, Valkeapää was one of the founders of the publishing house DAT. He established DAT to publish his books and music and to support and publish other Sámi artists and writers.

=== Art ===
Valkeapää was both an artist and a photographer. Many of his paintings were based on Sámi mythological beings, while his pencil drawings often featured birds, people and reindeer. He included his art in several of his poetry books, including his award-winning book Beaivi, Áhcázanand his 1981 collection Ádjaga silbasuonat, and he designed the covers for not only his own music records and books but also for books by other Sámi writers like Rauni Magga Lukkari's Jiengat vulget (1980) and Kirsti Paltto's Risten (1981). His artwork was also presented at the North Norway Festival in 1991.

Valkeapää donated thirty of his art pieces to Kautokeino Municipality, where the collection is on permanent display at Guovdageainnu Gilišillju (the Kautokeino Museum).

=== Activism ===
Valkeapää was a prominent figure in the movement for Sámi rights, which he connected to the broader international Indigenous rights movement. He expressed feelings of solidarity with North American Indigenous communities and particularly Inuit and other Arctic Indigenous people. In 1975, he attended the founding meeting of the World Council of Indigenous Peoples (WCIP) in Port Alberni, Canada as a Sámi representative of Finland. That same year, he referred to Sámi people as Indigenous people for the first time during an interview on Sámi radio. He was also chairman of the Sámi Writers' Association (Sami girječällid searvi).

Valkeapää became the cultural coordinator of the WCIP in 1978. In this role, he organised Davvi Šuvva, the world's first Sámi cultural festival, in Karesuvanto in 1979.

== Later life and death ==
Valkeapää received honorary doctorates from the University of Oulu and the University of Lapland in recognition of his work and cultural impact.

In February 1996, Valkeapää was severely injured in a car accident. Because of health issues related to his injuries, he moved to Skibotn and settled permanently. He built his house in the traditional lásságámmi style on land he received as a gift from the Storfjord Municipality for his 50th birthday. He became a Norwegian citizen in 2001.

In 2001, Valkeapää visited Japan to perform in a poetry event with other Finnish and Japanese writers. He died during his return home, at the house of his Japanese friend Junichiro Okura in Espoo. Valkeapää was buried at the Birtavárre cemetery in Troms.

== Legacy ==
Valkeapää is recognised and remembered as a vital figure in the revitalization of joik and the Sámi rights movement. In 2022, his joik Sámiid eatnan duoddariid was elected the national joik of the Sámi people at the 22nd Sámi Conference in Gällivare.

In 2004, the Lásságámmi Foundation was established by the Sámi Parliament of Norway, Storfjord municipality, Troms county, and the University of Tromsø to preserve Valkeapää's legacy and utilise his residence in Skibotn as a space for researchers and artists. The foundation is named after Valkeapää's house.

Posthumous publication of Valkeapää's work includes two poems included on his godson Niko Valkeapää's eponymous début album. Speaking on his godfather's influence, Niko stated that "I can’t deny that Nils-Aslak was a role model for me – he was a figure that I would look up to. He has been a source of inspiration and I have included two of his poems on my album to pay homage to him."

== Personal life ==
Valkeapää was bisexual, but hid his sexuality throughout his life.

== Discography ==
- Joikuja (1968)
- Juoigamat (1973)
- Vuoi Biret-Maaret, vuoi! (1974)
- De čábba niegut runiidit (1976)
- Duvva, Áilen Niga Elle ja Aillohaš (1976)
- Sámi eatnan duoddariid (1978)
- Sápmi, vuoi Sápmi! (1982)
- Davás ja geassái (1982)
- Beaivi, áhčážan (1988)
- Eanan, eallima eadni (1990)
- Sámi luondu, gollerisku (1992)
- Goase dušše (1994)
- Dálveleaikkat / Wintergames (1994)

== Written works ==
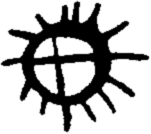
The Sun, My Father artwork by Nils-Aslak Valkeapää

Books

- Terveisiä Lapista (1971)

Poetry

- Giđa ijat čuovgadat (1974)
- Lávlo vizar biellocizáš (1976, Sabmelas-doaimahus)
- Ádjaga silbasuonat (1981, Vuovjjus)
- Ruoktu Váimmus (1985)
- Beaivi, áhčážan (1988)
- Nu guhkkin dat mii lahka = Så fjernt det nære (1994)
- Jus gazzebiehtár bohkosivččii (1996)
- Girddán, seivvodan (1999)
- Eanni, eannážan (2001)
