= Joik =

Traditional form of song in Sámi music

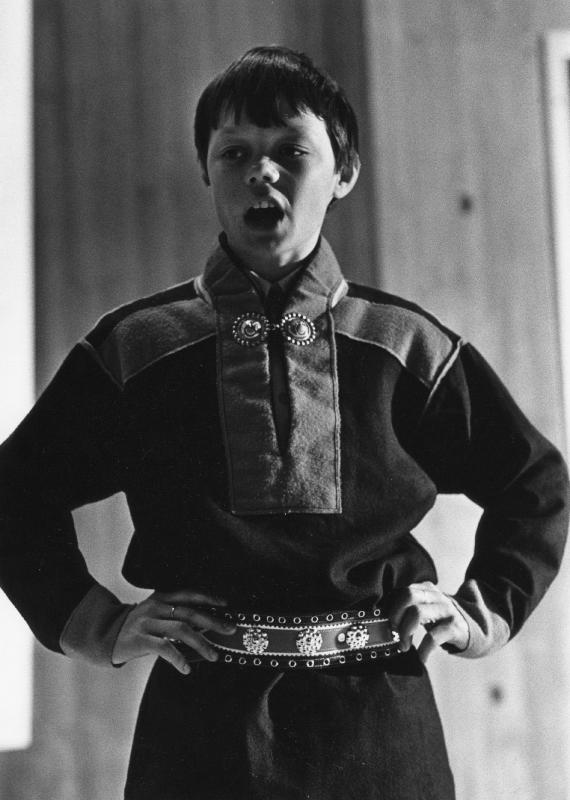
Aarne G. from Utsjoki performs a yoik (1984).

A joik or yoik (anglicised, where the latter spelling in English conforms with the pronunciation; also named luohti, vuolle, vuelie, or juoiggus in the Sámi languages) is a traditional form of song in Sámi music performed by the Sámi people of Sápmi in Northern Europe. A performer of joik is called a joikaaja (in Finnish), a joiker (in Norwegian, and anglicised) or jojkare (in Swedish). Originally, joik referred to only one of several Sami singing styles, but in English the word is often used to refer to all types of traditional Sami singing. As an art form, each joik is meant to reflect or evoke a person, animal, or place.

The sound of joik is comparable to the traditional chanting of some Native American cultures. Joik shares some features with the shamanistic cultures of Siberia, which mimic the sounds of nature.

== History ==
As the Sami culture had no written language in the past, the origins of joik are not documented. According to oral traditions, the fairies and elves of the arctic lands gave joiks to the Sámi People. Just Qvigstad, who recorded the Sami oral tradition, has documented this legend in several works. Music researchers believe joik is one of the oldest continuous musical traditions in Europe.

During the Christianization of the Sami, joiking was condemned as sinful. The assimilation policies (Norwegianization and similar) and the views of churches and ecclesiastical movements on joiking as sin have played important roles in its devaluation. One of the reasons that joiking was controversial may be its association with Noaidi (Sámi shamans) and pre-Christian mythology rituals, with joiking said to resemble magic spells. In the 1950s, it was forbidden to use joiking in Sami area schools. In 2014, a parish council discussed "if they should implement a total ban against music other than [church] hymns in the churches in Kautokeino and Maze. The proposal was shot down, but many still wonder why joiking in church is such a controversial issue".

Despite this suppression, joiking was strongly rooted in the culture and its tradition was maintained. Joiking is still practiced and is used as a source of inspiration. Recently, joiks are sung in two different styles: a traditional style, known as the "mumbling" style; and a modern style sung mostly by young people, and used as an element in contemporary Sami music.

== Personal and evocative nature ==
The joik is a unique form of cultural expression for the Sami people in Sápmi. This type of song can be deeply personal or spiritual in nature, often dedicated to a human being, an animal, or a landscape as a personal signature. Improvisation is not unusual. Each joik is meant to reflect a person or place. The Sami verb for presenting a joik (e.g. Northern Sami juoigat) is a transitive verb, which is often interpreted as indicating that a joik is not a song about the person or place, but that the joiker is attempting to evoke or depict that person or place through song – one joiks one's friend, not about one's friend (similarly to how one doesn't paint or depict about a flower, but depicts the flower itself).

== Musical and lyrical forms ==
Traditionally, joiks have short lyrics or no lyrics at all. However, there are other forms of joik (in the expanded sense of the word) that have a more epic type of lyrics. Joik is traditionally chanted a cappella, but in modern times may be accompanied by a drum (though not a Sami drum, which is used for ceremonial purposes only) or other musical instruments. The tonality of joik is mostly pentatonic, but joikers are at liberty to use any tones they please.

In northern Sami areas, most joiks are personal, that is, tied to a specific person. A joik is often made for a person at the time he or she is born. British actress Joanna Lumley experienced several joiks during her travel program Joanna Lumley in the Land of the Northern Lights, joining a northern Sami elder. Lumley learned that there appeared not to be a joik of the Aurora, and that the Sami do not talk much about them.

Joiking encompasses different styles:

- Vuelie is a South Sami joiking with an old-world feel, since its development was halted in the face of Christianity. To avoid being seen as savage or heathen, the South Sami mostly stopped joiking.
- Luohti is the North Sami variant and currently the most-developed joiking style.

Leuʹdd, known from the Skolt Sámi tradition is not a variant of joik, but a rather different kind of singing.

== Imitative sounds and shamanism ==
Some of the Sami people's traditional Noaidi beliefs and practices shared important features with those of some Siberian cultures. Some of their joiks were sung during shamanistic rites, and this memory is conserved also in a folklore text (a shaman story). As in various cultures of Northern Asia, mimicking sounds from nature can also be present.

== Joiking in popular culture ==
Even though joiking is a traditional form of singing, it has found its way into modern-day pop culture through adaptation and commercialization by various artists. One notable example is the 1980 Norwegian entry "Sámiid ædnan" for the Eurovision Song Contest, which features a song predominantly sung in Norwegian and interwoven with joiking in its chorus. Subsequently, this song has been occasionally used as a game chant by Norwegian football fans, as well as British fans from the Accrington Stanley F.C. Furthermore, an uncredited sample of this song was featured in the 2011 science-fiction horror film The Thing. The Norwegian entry in the Eurovision Song Contest 2019, "Spirit in the Sky", also has lines of joik in the chorus, and includes a joik solo.

Through its inclusion in other popular films, the Sami culture and joiking in particular has managed to achieve national acclaim. Of particular note is Disney's Frozen and its sequel Frozen 2, which are heavily inspired by Scandinavian and Sami culture. This is evident in its use of typical elements of the Sami people, including reindeer herding and outfit styles. Furthermore, South Sami musician and joiker Frode Fjellheim composed the opening track of Frozen, titled "Vuelie", which is an adaptation of his original track "Eatnemen Vuelie (Song of the Earth)". This growing adaptation of Sami elements, in particular joiking, points towards a gradual revitalization of the culture.

Joiking is also an important element of the Sami Grand Prix, an annual music competition modeled after the Eurovision Song Contest. This competition draws contestants from Norway, Sweden and Finland, with strong representation from minorities belonging to the Sami community. The traditional art form is significant in both the joik and song competition of the Grand Prix. In the joik component, contestants, usually dressed in traditional Sami clothing, perform joiks that are specifically prepared for the competition, without any accompanying instruments. The succeeding song component features participants who often incorporate elements of joiking into their pop entries, which suggests a revival and growing appeal of infusing traditional Sami musical practices with modern-day music.

In addition, the 1970s proved to be a fruitful period for the Sami people and joik music in particular, with what academics have coined the "joik renaissance". Specifically, the emergence of Sami-owned record company, Jårgalæddji, in Norway, that resulted from a collaboration between Sami musicians. As a result, it became easier for Sami artistes and producers to gain funding for their projects, with over 40 albums and cassettes of Sami and joik music released in that period. Sources of funding included not only private investors, but also the Norwegian and Swedish culture boards. This led to an unprecedented commercialization of Sami music, as well as the performance of joiking, which was a crucial focus of the Jårgalæddji. While the bankruptcy of this record company in the mid-1980s led to a slowdown in production of Sami and joik albums, such growth led to a resurgence of interest in traditional Sami culture and music.

Other artists who are famous for their interpretations of joik include Mari Boine, Jon Henrik Fjällgren and the band Korpiklaani, who have combined joiks with various other styles such as jazz, metal and rock. In particular, Fjällgren won the Swedish Talang 2014 competition, a reality talent show, through his moving rendition of traditional joik songs. He subsequently released a debut studio album in 2014, Goeksegh, which features multiple joik tracks such as "Daniel’s Joik", "The Reindeer Herder’s Joik", and "Nejla’s Joik", and took part several times in Melodifestivalen, Sweden's Eurovision selection, with joik songs.

== Notable artists ==
- Adjágas, a Norwegian band, has forwarded joiking around the world.
- Áilloš, a Sámi actor, composer and folk musician from Norway.
- Nils Mattias Andersson (1882–1975) was a joiker from Sweden.
- Angelit is a Finnish Sami folk group which has similarly evolved their joik musical traditions.
- Mari Boine from Norway is one of the most popular artists of her Sami culture. She blends elements of joik with other idioms, including jazz, rock, and world music.
- Fred-René Buljo is a Norwegian joiker and rapper who, as one-third of the supergroup KEiiNO, represented Norway in the Eurovision Song Contest 2019 with the song, "Spirit in the Sky".
- Jon Henrik Fjällgren is a Colombian-born Swedish singer and jojkare, an interpreter of Joik Sami songs, winner of the Swedish Talang Sverige 2014 competition, and three-time participant in Melodifestivalen (2015, 2017 and 2019) with the songs "Jag är fri (Manne leam frijje)", "En värld full av strider (Eatneme gusnie jeenh dåaroeh)" (featuring Aninia) and "Norrsken (Goeksegh)", coming 2nd, 3rd, and 4th, respectively.
- Frode Fjellheim is a widely known joiker, front-man of Transjoik. Fjellheim contributed the joik "Eatnamen Vuelie" ("Song of the Earth") as the opening song to Frozen.
- Antye Greie's record Source Voice contains one track titled "Digital Yoik", inspired by her time spent with Sami people in Northern Finland.
- Mattis Hætta is a Norwegian joiker and singer who, together with Sverre Kjelsberg, represented Norway in the Eurovision Song Contest 1980 with the song, "Sámiid ædnan".
- Ella Marie Hætta Isaksen has won the Sámi Grand Prix (2016) and the Liet International (2017), as well as the Norwegian National Television-show Stjernekamp (2018). In 2017 Isaksen started the band ISÁK, that combines joik with modern electronic pop. Their music is energetic and made for dancing, as well as carrying messages of equal rights, Sami culture and language, climate action, environmental protection and feminism. They are lauded for their unparalleled live shows and fusion of music genres and languages, bringing Sami culture to a wider Norwegian and international audience.
- Inga Juuso was a Norwegian joiker, actress and artist born in Jokkmokk, Sweden in 1945 and grew up in Alta, Norway. She died in 2014. She was one of the major contributors to the Sámi music and culture.
- Sofia Jannok is a Swedish singer from Gällivare, Sweden. She mainly sings in Sami and does joiking.
- Jonne Järvelä of the Finnish band Korpiklaani (formerly known as Shaman) is proficient at joiking, though little-known outside the folk metal circuit. Both of Shaman's albums were labeled as "joik metal", drawing heavily from Sami music. After the name-change, the band switched to a more conventional folk-metal sound. He was also featured on the Jaktens Tid album of fellow Finnish folk metal band, Finntroll.
- Marja Mortensson, Sami joiker and singer was born 5 March 1995. She grew up in the Svahken Sijte reindeer herding region in Norway. Her music is grounded South Sami traditions. Maria has studied and mastered the joik tradition for several years and has collaborated with acclaimed Sami musician Frode Fjellhein.
- Ulla Pirttijärvi mixes traditional joik with more modern musical trends.
- Wimme Saari is one of the world's most renowned Sami artists and traditional musicians, whose use of joik is a central factor in his music. He has been collaborating with other artists in recent years, including Swedish trio Hedningarna. Saari mixes some elements of the old-style joiking with new sounds.
- Ánde Somby is a traditional joik artist and a research scholar at the Faculty of Law, university of Tromsø, who joiks persons, animals, and landscapes.
- Nils-Aslak Valkeapää was a well-known modern Sami writer, musician, and artist using joik in his work. He performed at the opening ceremony of the 1994 Winter Olympic Games in Lillehammer, Norway.
- Najana is a Sámi/Swedish/Norwegian musician and artist with roots from the northern north. Her music can be described as ethno pop combined with joik.
- Majlis (Maj-Lis) Ingegerd Skaltje. Despite not being a yoiker herself, she has received awards for her success in improving the visibility of the yoik in written and film form.

== See also ==
- Non-lexical vocables in music
