= Konrad Kaspersen =

Norwegian jazz musician (born 1948)

- Born: 1 March 1948 (age 78); Tromsø, Troms
- Origin: Norway
- Genres: Jazz
- Occupation: Musician
- Instrument: Upright bass

Konrad Kaspersen (born 1 March 1948 in Tromsø, Norway) is a Norwegian jazz musician (upright bass).

== Career ==
Kaspersen contributed in Kurt Samuelsen's band, including Henning Gravrok, Kjell Bartholsen and Thorgeir Stubø in the late 70's and early 80's, showing up on scenes like Moldejazz. Throughout the 80's He was also involved in some projects in other genres, as with folk singers such as Trygve Henrik Hoff and Tove Karoline Knutsen, and blues with Chris Lyngedal. As jazz musician he has also toured with Knut Riisnæs, Odd Riisnæs, Per Husby, Øystein Norvoll Quintet and with Rikskonsertene. He has been a regular member of Alf Kjellman's band, and he performed "Blåfrostfestivalen" in 2005, together with Ivar Antonsen and Finn Sletten, as well as at "Chrisfestivalen" in Kjøllefjord, in memory of blues the singer Chris Lyngedal Kaspersen such as was bassist for. Here he festival musician with several constellations.

In the 90's He was regional musician in the band "Jazz i Nord" together with the pianist Jørn Øien, drummer Trond Sverre Hansen and trombonist Øystein B. Blix. This group collaborated with Marit Sandvik releasing the album Song Fall Soft (1995).

Kaspersen has collaborated with the drummer Trond Sverre Hansen, which has laid the foundation for many constellations, among them Hallgeir Pedersen Trio. They were awarded a tour in Norway by "Norsk Jazzforum" (2001), where they appeared on scenes like "Trondheim Jazzfestival". The album West Coast Blues (2002), was recorded at the club "Blå" during the same tour.

== Honors ==
- Stubøprisen 2001

== Discography ==
- 1976: World of Dreams (Apollo Records), with Ole G. Nilssen
- 1980: Rækved Og Lørveblues (RCA Victor), with Trygve Henrik Hoff
- 1987: Den Glade Pessimisten (OK Produksjoner), with Ragnar Olsen & Sverre Kjelsberg
- 1992: Tenn Lampa (Arctica Label), with Tove Karoline Knutsen
- 1995: Song, Fall Soft (Taurus Records), with Marit Sandvik
- 1999: Feskarliv Anno 1900 (Lofotselskapet), with Dag Kajander
- 2001: Jazz From North Norway (Gemini Music), Distant Reports with various artists
- 2002: West Coast Blues (Hot Club Records), within Hallgeir Pedersen Trio
- 2007: June 1999 (Reflect Records), with Alf Kjellman
- 2008: Feather, But No Wings (Reflect Records), with Alf Kjellman
- 2008: Kokfesk & Ballader (Grappa Music), compilation with Trygve Henrik Hoff
- 2008: Dilemma single (Park Grammofon), with Anne Lande & Per Husby
- 2009: Helt Nær (Park Grammofon), with Anne Lande & Per Husby

Awards
Preceded by Trond Sverre Hansen	Recipient of the Stubøprisen; 2001	Succeeded by Øystein B. Blix
