= Øystein Norvoll =

Norwegian jazz musician (born 1954)

- Born: 26 June 1954 (age 72); Tromsø, Norway
- Genres: Jazz
- Occupation: Musician
- Instrument: Guitar

Øystein Norvoll (born 26 June 1954 in Tromsø, Norway) is a Norwegian jazz musician (guitar). He won the "Gjett på Jazz", and annual jazz competition, in 1973.

== Career ==
Norvoll was early inspired by the West Coast jazz guitarists Barney Kessel and Jim Hall. He was chairman of the Nordnorsk Jazzforum, og sentral i dennes utgivelse av Distant Reports med nordnorsk jazz (Gemini, 2001). Øystein Norvoll Quintet appeared at the Kongsberg Jazzfestival in 1988. He has also played with Hallgeir Pedersen in their collaborative project "Bebop Guitars" ("Nordland Musikkfestuke" and Festival of North Norway, 1999), duo at Moldejazz 2003, with his wife Marit Sandvik, with Jan Arvid Johansen on the album Tonen og Kjærligheten (2005), as well as in the band "Stett", together with Jørn Øien, Asbjørn Johannessen, Konrad Kaspersen and Trond Sverre Hansen (1989) and Kjell Svendsen Quintet. He is also a teacher in the music school in Tromsø.

Norvoll has frequently performed with his wife Marit Sandvik, first time at Moldejazz 2003. Within the band "Bossa Nordpå" he released the album Uma Onda No Mar (2005), including Marit Sandvik (vocals), Henning Gravrok (saxophone), Finn Sletten (drums), Oddmund Finnseth (bass) and Helge Sveen (saxophone). Internationally, he has collaborated with colleagues guitar Randy Johnston, Louis Stewart and the alto saxophonist Jon Gordon. In 2012 they played at Harstad within 'Ervik Storband'.

== Personal life ==
Norvollis married to Marit Sandvik, a vocalist. His daughter is Dagny.

== Honors ==
- Stubøprisen 1995
- Norske Barne- og Ungdomsbokforfatteres pris 2007

== Discography ==
- 2001: Distant Reports med nordnorsk jazz (Gemini )
- 2005: Uma Onda No Mar (Gemini Records), within "Bossa Nordpå»
- 2005: Tonen og Kjærligheten (2005), with Jan Arvid Johansen
- 2008: Feather, But No Wings (Reflect Records), with Alf Kjellman
- 2008: Arctic Bird (Turn Left Prod), with Kjell Bartholdsen

Awards
| Preceded by Marit Sandvik | Recipient of the Stubøprisen; 1995 | Succeeded by Jan Gunnar Hoff |
