= Trond Sverre Hansen =

Norwegian jazz musician (born 1964)

- Born: 27 January 1964 (age 62); Narvik, Nordland
- Origin: Norway
- Genres: Jazz
- Occupations: Musician, composer
- Instrument: Drums
- Labels: Hot Club Records; NorCD

Trond Sverre Hansen (born 27 January 1964 in Narvik, Norway) is a Norwegian jazz musician (drums). He is the son of jazz trombonist, Viggo Hansen and is considered one of the most prominent Norwegian drummers in the bebop genre.

== Career ==
Hansen debuted at the age of 14 with the legendary north-Norwegian guitarist Thorgeir Stubø, and participated in his quartet (1981–82). In the early 1980s he also played within "Samasjyen" in Harstad, and was, in other words a very young contributor to Narviks vital jazz scene at this time. He appeared in Erling Wicklund's show Ung norsk jazz at NRK in the early 1990s, and played with regional musician group "Jazz i Nord" together with the pianist Jørn Øien, bassist Konrad Kaspersen and trombonist Øystein B. Blix. This ensemble is documented on the album Song, Fall Soft (1995) with vocalist Marit Sandvik.

Hansen joined the Kjell Bartholdsen Quintet at "Festspillene i Harstad" 1984, collaborated within Øystein Norvoll Quintet at Kongsberg Jazzfestival in 1988, and was part of the Ernst-Wiggo Sandbakk Group in 1989–90. The combination Kaspersen/Hansen is a strong jazz accompaniment, and has laid the foundation for many constellations, among them Hallgeir Pedersen Trio (from 1999) which he is a permanent member of. His contribution here can be heard on the plates West Coast Blues (2002) Wistful (2004) and Bluero (2006). Another release Hansen contributes in is the album Monk Moods (1994) with the pianist Knut Kristiansen.

== Honors ==
- 1982: "Dølajazz" scholarship
- 1999: Stubøprisen

== Discography ==
- 1987: Den Glade Pessimisten (OK Produksjoner), with Ragnar Olsen & Sverre Kjelsberg
- 1995: Song, Fall Soft (Taurus Records), with Marit Sandvik & "Jazz I Nord»
- 1995: Monk Moods (Odin Records), with Knut Kristiansen
- 2002: West Coast Blues (Hot Club Records), within Hallgeir Pedersen Trio
- 2004: Wistful (Hot Club Records), within Hallgeir Pedersen Trio
- 2006: Bluero (Hot Club Records), within Hallgeir Pedersen Trio
- 2008: Feather, But No Wings (Reflect Records), with Alf Kjellman
- 2009: Tur (NorCD), with "Tromsø Kunstforsyning" & Øystein B. Blix

Awards
Preceded by Jan Gunnar Hoff	Recipient of the Stubøprisen; 1999	Succeeded by Konrad Kaspersen
