= Bodø Jazz Open =

Jazz festival in Bodø, Norway

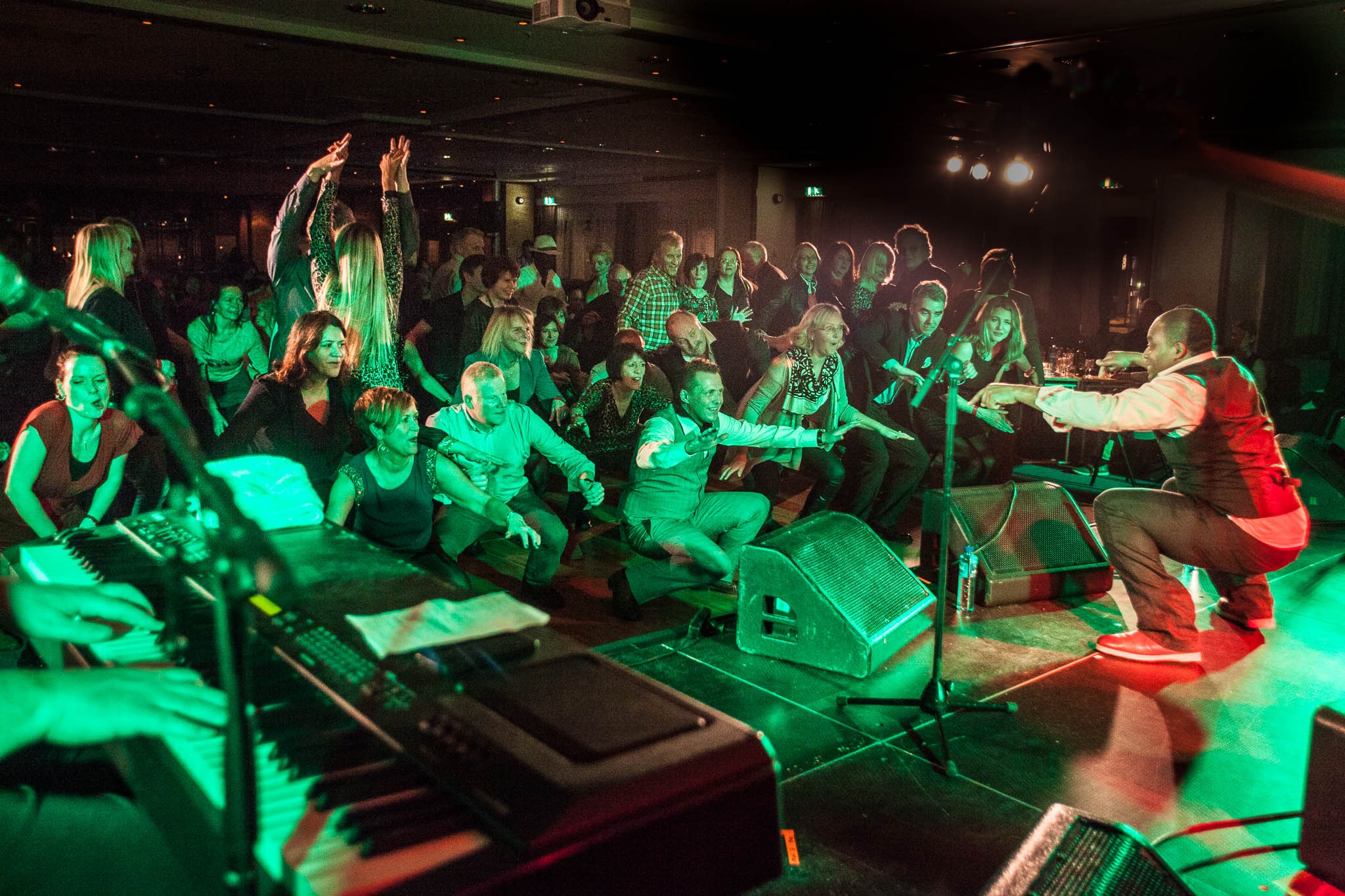
- Mambo Compagnero 2013.
- Status: Active
- Genre: Jazz Festival
- Date: Late January
- Begins: 31 January 2019
- Ends: 2 February 2019
- Frequency: Annually
- Location: Bodø
- Country: Norway
- Years active: 2011–present
- Inaugurated: 2010
- Founder: Jan Gunnar Hoff; Tore Johansen; Erik Johansen
- Website: www.bodojazzopen.no

The Bodø Jazz Open is a jazz festival which has run annually at the end of January since 2011 in the Norwegian town of Bodø. The aim of the festival is to bring together local, national and international artists for collaborations, jam sessions and workshops. Between 2,000 and 3,000 people visit the festival. Venues such as Topp 13, Dama di, Paviljongen, Sinus, Bodø Kulturhus, and Sydøst have been used to host events during the festival.

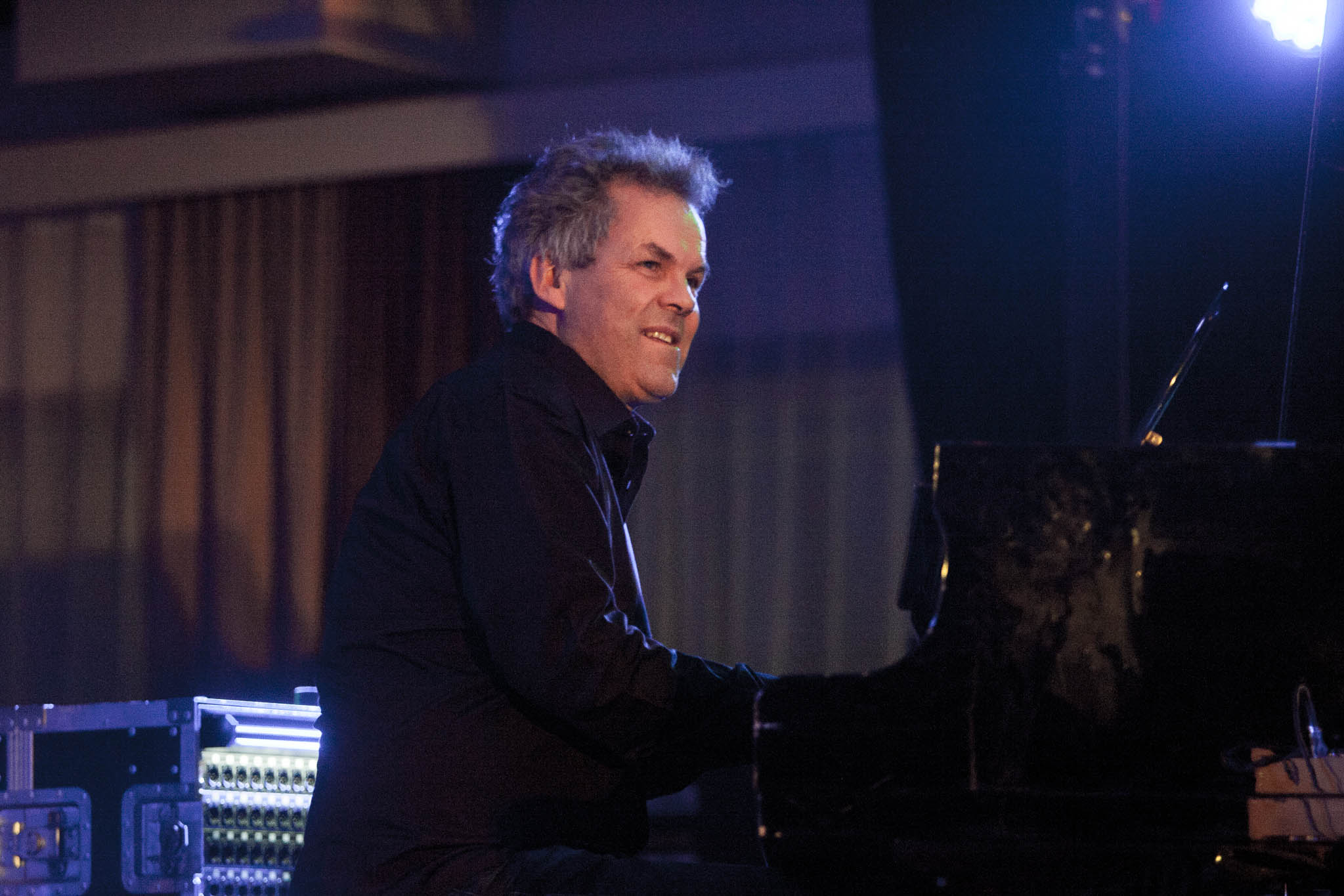
Jan Gunnar Hoff at Bodø Jazz Open 2013.

Bodø has a long history of jazz music. In 1921 the Bodø Jazz Band, with a lineup of 15 musicians, was established as the town's first jazz band. The festival was initially called the Bodø International Jazz Festival before changing its name to Bodø Jazz Fest. In 2010 the name was changed again to Bodø Jazz Open, with the name initiated on 15 November 2010, by Jan Gunnar Hoff, Tore Johansen and Erik Johansen. The first running of the festival as the Bodø Jazz Open took place in January 2011, and was a celebration of 90 years of jazz in Bodø.

== Concerts ==
The number of events during the festival rose from 25 in 2011 to 33 in 2012. The goal for 2013 was not to increase the number of events, but to consolidate and ensure the quality of the festival. In addition to evening concerts, the festival organisers also arranged gigs called "After Work Jazz", with free performances taking place in cafés.

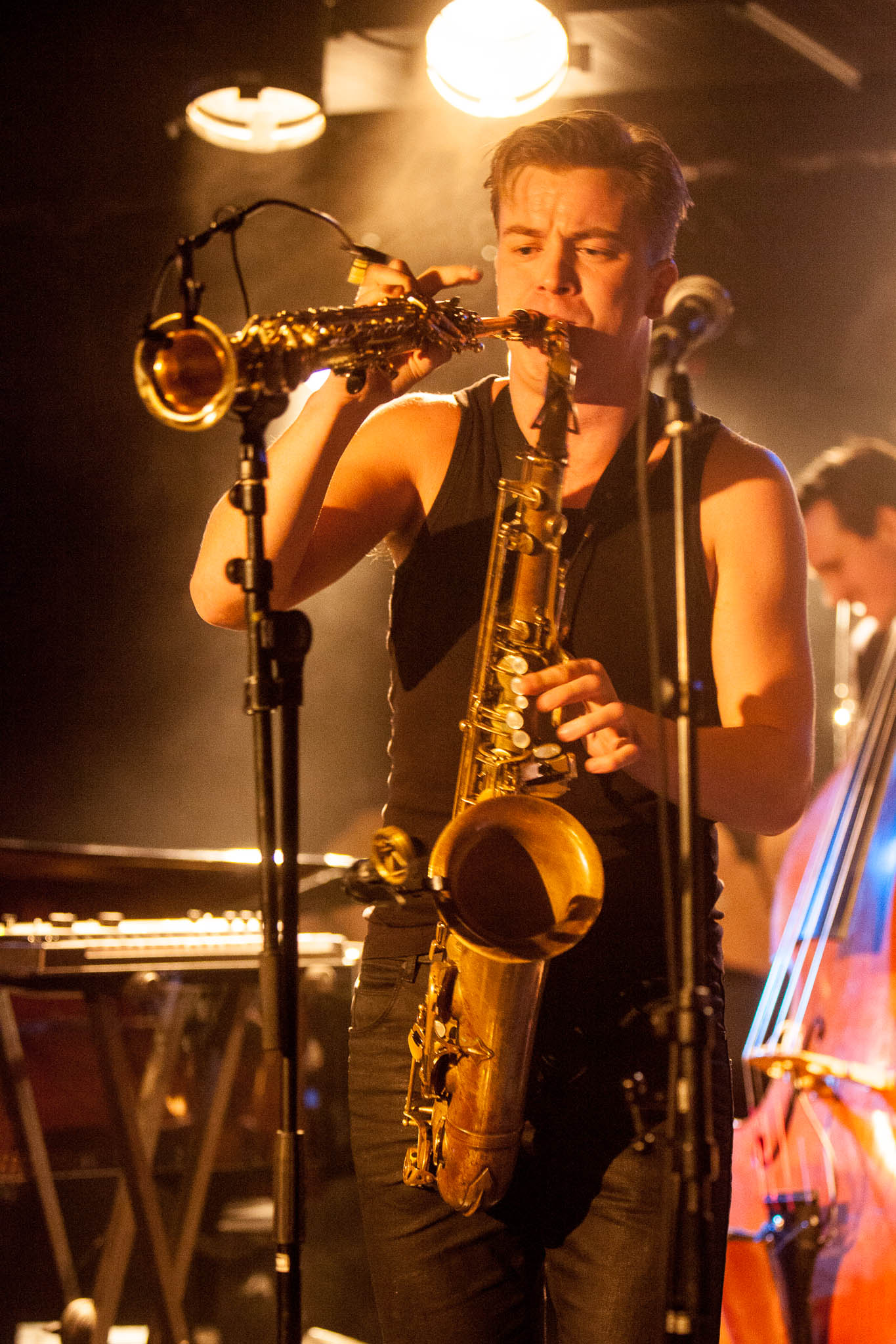
Marius Neset with JazzKamikaze 2013. (Photo by Henrik Dvergsdal)

== Bands and artists ==
=== 2011 (26–29 January) ===
- Norway – Misvær Ska Forening
- Norway – Hunting the light
- Norway – Bugge Wesseltoft
- The Netherlands – FOCUS
- Norway – Acuna/Hoff/Mathisen
- Norway – Torun Eriksen w/ Bodø Big Band
- Norway – Ole Hamre
- Norway – Slettens Merengue and Salsa-Prosjekt feat. Alex Acuna

=== 2012 ( 25–28 January) ===
- USA – Larry Carlton Quartet
- Marengue feat. Denmark – Marilyn Mazur
- Norway – Bodø Big Band
- Norway – Marit Sandvik
- Norway – Joddski
- Norway – Henning Gravrok Band
- Sweden – Anders Jormin
- Norway – Jan Gunnar Hoff
- Norway – Arve Henriksen
- USA – Tom Waits Tribute
- Norway – Audun Kleive
- Norway – 120 days
- Norway – Tore Johansen
- Norway – Your Headlights Are On
- Norway – Barnejazz with Espen Ruud and Nils Jansen
- Norway – Jaga Jazzist
- Norway – Gabriel
- Norway – Kjell Nordeng

=== 2013 (23–27 January) ===
- USA – Mike Stern w/ Norway – Jan Gunnar Hoff Quartet
- Norway – Pushwagon
- Norway – Oslo Strykekvartett
- Norway – Arild Andersen w/ Bodø Rhythm Group and Bodø Big Band
- Norway – Eivind Aarset
- Norway – Oh!
- Denmark – JazzKamikaze
- Norway – Tore Johansen
- Norway – Sommerfuglfisk
- Denmark – Hanne Boel
- Norway – Hanne Hukkelberg
- Norway – Mambo Compañeros
- Norway – Lisa Dillan / Rolf Lennart Stensø Duo

=== 2014 (22–26 January) ===
- Norway – Terje Rypdal and Denmark – Palle Mikkelborg w/ Bodø Big Band
- Norway – Frode Alnæs Trio
- Norway – LAVA
- Norway – Petter Wettre and England – Jason Rebello
- USA – Steve Gadd

=== 2015 (21–24 January) ===
- Norway – Jan Garbarek Group
- Denmark – Marilyn Mazur's Future Song w/ Norway – Eivind Aarset, Nils Petter Molvær a.o.
- Norway – Elle Marja Eira
- Norway – Ole Jørn Myklebust and Roger Ludvigsen
- Norway – Aleksander Kostopoulos
- Iceland – Mezzoforte
- Norway – Knut Reiersrud
- Norway – Arctic Philharmonic - for the second ever performance of England – Django Bates’ bass clarinet concerto, written for Norway – Håvard Lund

== Eksterne lenker ==
- Official website
