= Kristin Mellem =

Norwegian musician (born 1965)

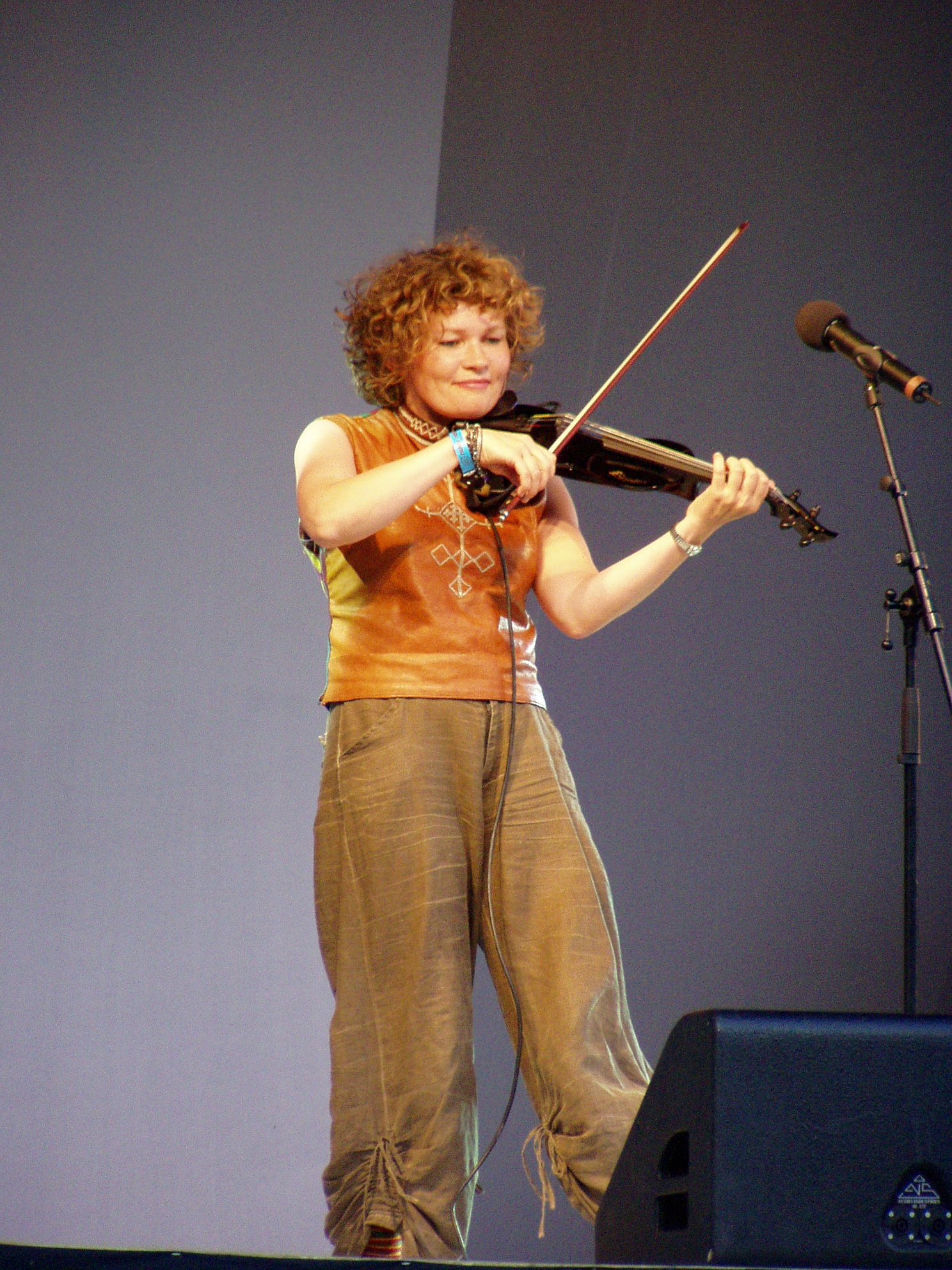
- Born: 21 March 1965 (age 61)
- Occupations: Musician, composer, conductor
- Known for: Involvement in music in Northern Norway

Kristin Mellem (born 21 March 1965) is a Norwegian musician (violin), composer and conductor known for her involvement in Northern Norway's musical scene.

She was educated at Nordnorsk Music Conservatory and Bergen Music Conservatory (1984–1990) and has worked as a violin teacher in Balsfjord, Bergen, Hadsel, and Tromsø. Furthermore, she has been named regional musician and conductor of the Vesterålen Symphony Orchestra, part of the Nordnorsk Chamber Orchestra (1987–1997), Tromsø Symphony Orchestra (1993–present), associated with Hålogaland Teater (Spellemann på taket, 2002) and Rikskonsertene (1997–2000). Mellem has contributed to the Eventyr festival in Tromsø since 1998, toured with Boknakaran (2001–2002), and contributed to releases with Moya på Tvoya.

With the Tromsø Symphony Orchestra she composed the performance Reiser gjennom tid (Travels through time, 2002). In 2004, she composed Stemmemøte (Meeting of voices) with Solveig Kringlebotn and Ingor Ánte Áilo Gaup (joik) for Nordlysfestivalen; together with Gaup, Jeđđehus was released the following year and nominated for the 2005 Edvardprisen. In cooperation with Bjørn Andor Drage she composed and performed fiddle music with the Tromsø Symphony Orchestra for the production Armon Lapset – Nådens barn (2004). The other musicians involved were Finn Sletten (percussion) and Sigmund Lillebjerka (violin), along with joik singer Inga Juuso.

Mellem formerly led the band Vajas (English: 'Echo') with Nils Johansen (synthesizer) from Bel Canto and Ánde Somby (joik). Their debut was at Nana Urfolksdager in 2003, and they toured internationally as well as performing at by:Larm in 2004.

In 2008, she was awarded Trygve Hoff's memorial award.
