= Roger Johansen (musician) =

Norwegian jazz drummer (born 1972)

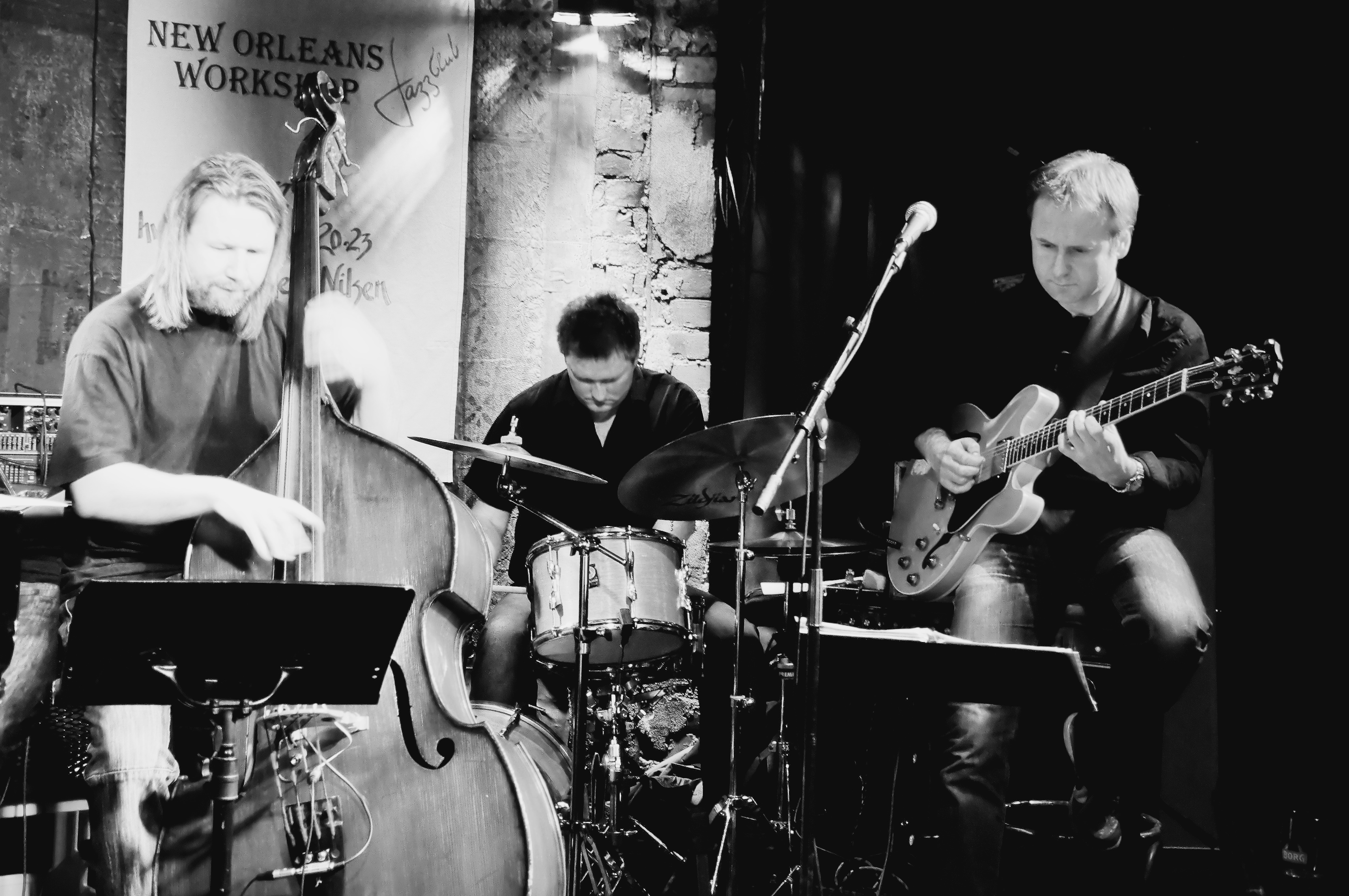
- Roger Johansen (drums) live at "Herr Nilsen" (2007), flanked by Hans Mathisen (guitar) to the right and Per Mathisen (bass) to the left.

Background information
- Born: 29 July 1972 (age 54); Bodø, Nordland
- Origin: Norway
- Genres: Jazz
- Occupations: Musician, composer
- Instrument: Drums
- Website: www.rogerjohansen.com

Roger Johansen (born 29 July 1972) is a Norwegian jazz musician (drums) and composer, the older brother of Jazz trumpetist Tore Johansen, known as leader of his own "Roger Johansen Group", and cooperations with musicians like Randy Brecker, Tore Johansen, Jan Erik Kongshaug, Hallgeir Pedersen, Harald Halvorsen, Halvard Kausland, and Staffan William-Olsson.

== Career ==
Johansen was born in Bodø. From an early age he was part of an active local music scene, starting with school corps and later in the grunge-like rock band "Fresh Fruit". The interest in jazz was really awakened when Johansen met with Jan Gunnar Hoff, Terje Venaas and drummer Finn Sletten in 1988. He joined the jazz band "Bodø Jazz Quintet" in 1992, and joined in his younger brother Tore Johansen's band from 1994. He also played with different Northern Norwegian bands, including "Øystein Norvoll Band" at the festival "Gygrejazz" in 1996.

In the period 1997–99 he worked as a regional musician in jazz trio "VoyageFar East", cooperating with Knut Kristiansen from Bergen and the bass player Svein Folkvord. Together they toured nationally and internationally with musicians like Hector Bingert, Gustavo Bergalli, Kevin Dean, Ailo Gaup and many others. At the same time he played with "Marit Hætta Øverli Band" (1994–98) and toured with her in Sweden, Finland, US and Canada, and also recorded for television (NRK, SVT/YLE and CNN) with her. As regional musician he participated in the band "Link", touring with musicians like Frode Alnæs, Ole Paus, Erik Bye, Mari Boine, and Ailo Gaup, all over Scandinavia. Together with Erik Halvorsen and bass player Dag Erik Pedersen (Mucician) from Hammerfest he played with the Jazz trio "Voyage", that made festival appearances and tours with musicians like Helge Sunde, Henning Gravrok, Frode Nymo, Cæcilie Norbye and Eckhard Baur, to name a few.

Johansen started as a freelance musician in the Stavanger in 1998 where he worked with artists such as Britt Synnøve Johansen, Mia Gundersen, Didrik Ingvaldsen, Ove Hetland, Gjertrud Økland and Randi Tytingvåg to name a few, and moved on to Oslo in 2001, where he currently stands as one of the most versatile drummers in Norway.

He has participated in a number of lineups with US musicians such as the trumpet legend Kenny Wheeler, trombonist Slide Hampton and Juan Pablo Torres, guitarist Randy Johnston, singer Barbara Morrison, pianists Hal Galper and Larry Vuckovich, saxophonists Bob Mintzer, George Garzone, Herb Geller and Scott Robinson, on tour and at festivals. He has also cooperated with the English pianist John Taylor, saxophonist John Surman, and several others.

The Johansen brothers started the label Inner Ear in 2007. They have released some nine albums, including Tore Johansens: Rainbow Session (2007), Giving (2008, "Tore Johansen Unity"), I.S. (2010, featuring Steve Swallow), Natt, stille (2010), Vigleik Storaas: Now (2007), Roger Johansen: World of Emily (2007), Fine Together (2011, feat. George Riedel), Elin Rosseland: Jazz Mass (2009), Eva Trones: Tango for en (2011, songs by Terje Nilsen)(www.innerear.no).

== Discography ==
Solo projects

- 2005: Evening songs (Taurus Records), with Marit Sandvik, Jon Eberson, Atle Nymo and Ole Morten Vågan
- 2007: World of Emily (Inner Ear), with Marit Sandvik, Jon Eberson, Atle Nymo, Helge Lien and Sondre Meisfjord
- 2011: Fine Together (Inner Ear), featuring Georg Riedel
- 2014: On The Up (Inner Ear), with Marit Sandvik, Jon Eberson, Atle Nymo and Sondre Meisfjord

With Tore Johansen

- 2003: Windows (Gemini Records), with Hallgeir Pedersen and Ole Morten Vågan
- 2005: Like That (Inner Ear), featuring Karin Krog
- 2008: Giving (Inner Ear), with "Tore Johansen Unity»
- 2009: Jazz Mass (Inner Ear), with Elin Rosseland, "Bodø Domkor" and "Bodø Sinfonietta»
- 2010: Natt, stille (Inner Ear)
- 2011: Nord (Inner Ear), with Odd Børretzen

With "Jørn Øien Trio»

- 2004: Short stories (Resonant Music)

With "Tungtvann»

- 2004: III: Folket Bak Nordavind (C+C Records)

With Helle Brunvoll and Halvard Kausland

- 2009: In Our House (Ponca Jazz Records)
