= Marianne Beate Kielland =

Norwegian mezzo-soprano

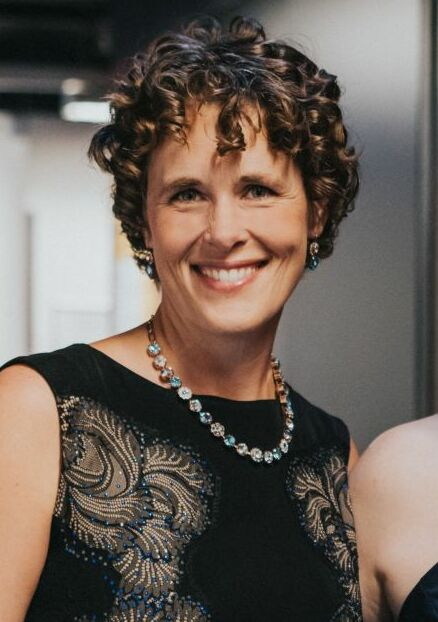
Marianne Beate Kielland in 2021

Marianne Beate Kielland (born 1975) is a Norwegian mezzo-soprano. She was born in Lørenskog, Norway and received a master's degree in contemporary music from the Norwegian Academy of Music. In 2009, she was awarded the Nordlysprisen. She was the first woman selected to guest-direct the Risør kammermusikkfest.

== Recordings ==
- Veslemøy synsk (Song cycle by Olav Anton Thommessen) (2011) - Nils Anders Mortensen piano. The cycle is based on the text Haugtussa by the Norwegian poet Arne Garborg.
- Händel cantatas for solo alto (2010) - Bergen Barokk
- Come away death (Songs by Korngold, Plagge, Sibelius, Ratkje, Finzi og Mussorgsky) (2009) - Sergei Osadchuk
- J. S. Bach: Vergnügte Pleißenstadt, BWV 216 (2005) - Osaka Bach Ensemble/Joshua Rifkin
- J. S. Bach: Matthew Passion (2006) - Dresdner Kammerchor/Kölner Kammerorchester/Helmut Müller-Brühl
- J. S. Bach: Alto solo cantatas BWV 35, 54, 169, 170 and 200 (2005) - Kölner Kammerorchester/Helmut Müller-Brühl
- J. S. Bach: Alto solo cantata BWV 35 (2005) - Kölner Kammerorchester/Helmut Müller-Brühl
- J. S. Bach: Messe in h-moll BWV 232 (2004) - Kölner Kammerorchester/Dresdner Kammerorchester/Helmut Müller-Brühl
- Vivaldi: Gloria, Kyrie (2004) - Nidarosdomens jentekor/Norsk Barokkorkester/Edward Higginsbottom
- Ragnar Bjerkreim: Kong David (2004) Oratorie Kor Z
- J. S. Bach - Markuspasjonen (2003) - Norsk Barokkorkester/Edward Higginsbottom
- Alf Hurum: Fandango - Complete Songs with Piano (2003) - Øyvind Aase

Awards
Preceded by Ragnar Rasmussen	Recipient of the Nordlysprisen; 2009	Succeeded by Bodvar Moe
