= Øystein B. Blix =

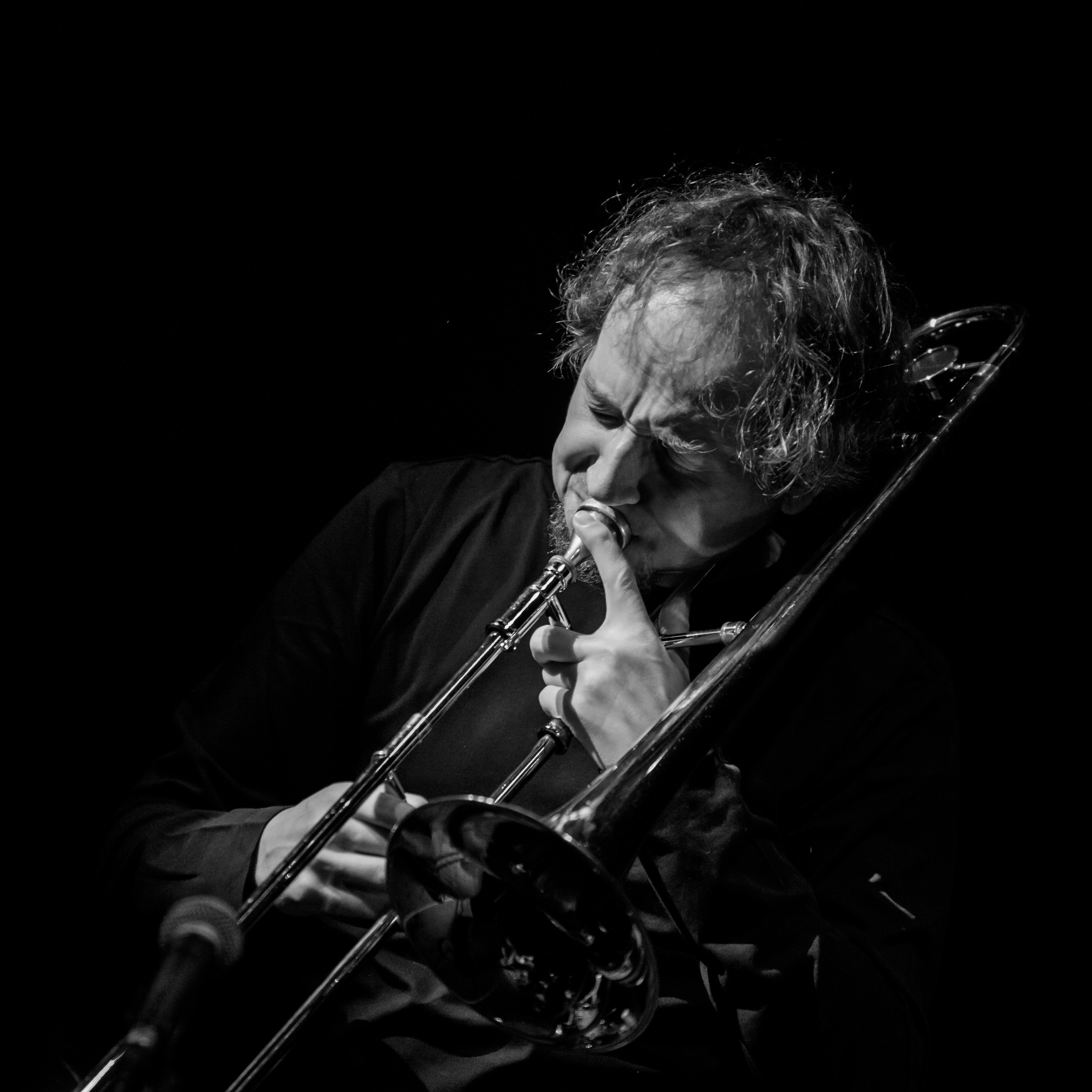

Background information
- Born: Øystein Bjørn Blix; 5 November 1966 (age 59); Tromsø, Troms
- Origin: Norway
- Genres: Jazz
- Occupations: Musician, composer
- Instrument: Trombone
- Website: www.oysteinblix.com

Øystein Bjørn Blix (born 5 November 1966 in Tromsø, Norway) is a Norwegian Jazz musician (trombone) and sound designer, central to the Tromsø Jazz scene and Head of Tromsø Jazzklubb from 2001.

== Career ==
Blix is a graduate of the Jazz Program at Trondheim Musikkonservatorium (1988). He was first recognized as trombonist in the band "Jazz i Nord" together with Jørn Øien (piano), Konrad Kaspersen (double bass) and Trond Sverre Hansen (drums) releasing the album Song, Fall Soft featuring Marit Sandvik (vocals) in 1997. He has led the trio "Pentateuch" expanding to the quartet "Blix Band" in 1990. They released the album På en lyserød sky (1997), including Niels Præstholm (double bass), Nils-Olav Johansen (guitar) and Tor Haugerud (drums). It was followed up with the album Texas (1998), where Didrik Ingvaldsen contributed on trumpet. He toured in the period 1999–2003 together with the trumpeter Gustavo Bergalli, within the band "Blix/Bergalli Group" comprising additional Jan Gunnar Hoff (piano), Sigurd Ulveseth (bass) and Magnus Gran (drums).

In 2002 we find Blix in a duo "Tromsø Kunstforsyning" performing contemporary music together with the celloist Bernt Simen Lund documented on the album Tur (2009). Otherwise, he has participated on the Tromsø elektronika-miljø scene, with such as Gaute Barlindhaug (alias "Kolar Goi") (Kolar Goi, 2003).

Blix works as assistant professor at the University of Tromsø, department of fine arts, where he lectures in acoustics. He is also director of the record company Reflect.

== Honors ==
- NOMUS scholarship, 1999 & 2002
- Norwegian Government Travel and Study Grants, 1994, 2001 & 2005
- Torgeir Stubøs Avard for special effort for the jazz in Northern Norway (Stubøprisen), 2003
- Tromsø Municipality Cultural Grant, 2004.

== Discography ==
=== Solo projects ===
- 1996: På en lyserød sky (NorCD), Blix Band
- 1998: Texas (NorCD), within Blix Band
- 2010: Pinseria (NorCD), Blix Band

=== Collaborative works ===
- 1997: Song, Fall Soft (Gemini Records), with Marit Sandvik
- 1999: Casamance (TKCD), with Tamba Kounda
- 2003: Kolar Goi (Beatservice Records), with Kolar Goi
- 2005: Aline Sitoe (King Snake), with Tamba Kounda
- 2007: June 1999 (Reflect), with Alf Kjellman
- 2008: Feather, But No Wings (Reflect), with Alf Kjellman
- 2009: Tur (NorCD), within "Tromsø Kunstforsyning"

== Theatre and film ==
- 1997: Nakkeknekk (Totalteatret)
- 1999: Englepels (Totalteatret), was filmed in 2000
- 2003: Søstre (Haugen Produksjoner)
- 2004: Berøre (Stein Elvestad/Per Bogstad Gulliksen)
- 2005: Kaffebønneslekten (Stein Elvestad/Trine H. Blixrud)
- 2005: Søstre (Haugen Produksjoner/Riksteatret)

Awards
Preceded by Konrad Kaspersen	Recipient of the Stubøprisen; 2003	Succeeded by Tore Johansen
