= Alf Kjellman =

Norwegian jazz musician (1938–2010)

- Born: 17 January 1938; Tromsø, Norway
- Died: 14 September 2010 (aged 72)
- Instruments: Tenor saxophone Baritone saxophone Alto saxophone

Alf Erling Kjellman (17 January 1938 in Tromsø - 14 September 2010) was a Norwegian jazz musician (tenor, baritone and alto saxophones), organizer and composer.

== Biography ==
Kjellman led his own revue orchestra in Tromsø (1955 and 56), was member of the «Swinging Quartet» (1956–57), Sverre Lund Quartet (1958–59), performed saxophone and wrote arrangements for the local jazz club orchestra (1958–59).

In 1959 he moved to Oslo and joined the Oslo jazz scene, first with Kjell Karlsen (1959), then with Ditlef Eckhoff (at the first Moldejazz in 1961). Kjellman also contributed to film music on Line (film) (1961) including with Atle Hammer, Frode Thingnæs, Mikkel Flagstad, Eilif Holm, Einar Iversen, Erik Amundsen and Egil Johansen. In the 60's and 70's he contributed to the Club 7 environment, contributing to releases with Arild Wikstrøm, as well as the blues band Sapphires. He moved to Molde in 1975 and played on the album Østerdalsmusikk, then he moved on to Bodø where he collaborated with Kjell Bartholsen (1976). After his return to Oslo he joined Ola Calmeyer (1977–79) among others. He has also contributed to albums by Søyr (2000), as well as a track with Ola Calmeyer on Nordnorsk jazzforums collection album Distant Reports (Gemini Records, 2001).

He led his own The Alf Kjellman Project with the album You'll always need friends (Gemini Records, 1998), where Kjellman's compositions were performed with the band Frode Nymo saxophone, Harald Johnsen upright bass, Inge Stangvik vocals, Jørn Øien piano, Kevin Dean and Ole Jacob Hansen drums. His role was as composer, conductor and band leader. Until 2006, he had not yet performed his saxophones on a single solo album until his colleague and friend, the trombonist Øystein B. Blix started the label Reflect to release the album June 1999, which was radio recording with Kjellman, taken by NRK during the 1999 Festspillene i Nord-Norge. This also marked Kjellman's 70th birthday celebration. According to journalist Bjørn Hansen he

«... has been called the musician of the jazz musicians. Alf Erling Kjellman belong to the legends of Norwegian jazz, an instrumentalist, composer and organizer known by all contemporary performers, but almost unknown to the big audience»

For the 2011 Nordlysfestivalen Henning Gravrok composed Fire variasjoner over Alf Kjellmans gode råd, performed by Nordnorsk Storband featuring Tomasz Stanko.
