= Hallgeir Pedersen =

Norwegian jazz guitarist (born 1973)

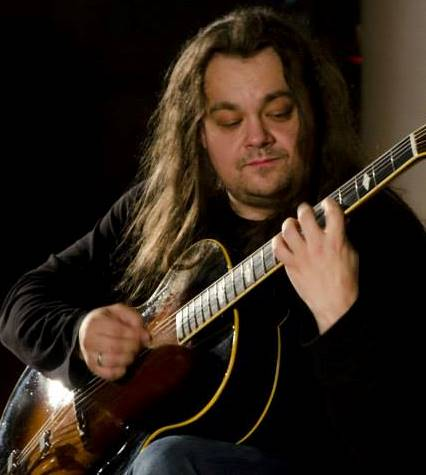
- Pedersen in 2014.

Background information
- Born: 24 May 1973 (age 53); Tromsø, Troms
- Origin: Norway
- Genres: Jazz
- Occupations: Musician, composer
- Instrument: Guitar
- Website: www.hallgeirpedersen.com

Hallgeir Pedersen (born 24 May 1973) is a Norwegian jazz guitarist, well known for his Thorgeir Stubø, Wes Montgomery and Coltrane inspired bop guitar performances and recordings like West Coast Blues (2002) with his own trio.

== Career ==
Pedersen was raised in Øksfjord, a small village in Loppa Municipality in Finnmark county, northern Norway. He started early playing heavy-metal guitar, inspired by guitarists like Ritchie Blackmore, Ronni Le Tekrø, and Yngwie Malmsteen. The latter led him to study the music of Johann Sebastian Bach, and classical guitar studies on the music program at Holstbakken videregående skole in Alta (1989–92). During this period he became interested in bebop, and he was introduced to the work of the renowned Norwegian jazz guitarist Thorgeir Stubø (1943–1986). His first jazz band was the Alta Jazz Trio, with a festival debut at the Varanger Festival in 1995. Later he joined bassist Dag Erik Pedersen in Romanian pianist Constantin "Nuti" Tănase's trio. Pedersen had already developed a distinct guitar style performing mostly in northern Norway.

Pedersen started the jazz band Bebop Guitars in 1998, with another guitarist Øystein Norvoll. This band represented Nordnorsk Jazzforum at their 25 anniversary, performing at Festspillene i Nord-Norge in 1999. He was discovered by a broader audience when presented at NRK by jazz host Erling Wicklund, his first feature radio concert live with Bebop Guitars at Nordland Musikkfestuke in Bodø for NRK P2. After this he was often referred to as "Norway's new king of bebop guitar" and "The Phantom of Øksfjord", in the Norwegian jazz press.

From 1999 he led the Hallgeir Pedersen Trio with Trond Sverre Hansen (drums) and Konrad Kaspersen (double bass). With the support of Norsk jazzforum they toured Norway in 2001, including the Trondheim Jazz Festival and recorded their first album West Coast Blues at the jazz club Blå in Oslo (2002). The release has received glowing chalk security in among others jazz magazine: Orkesterjournalen (no 1, 2003) and U.S. magazine Just jazz Guitar (no 5, 2003). Here he interpreted compositions by Wes Montgomery and Kenny Burrell. Pedersen was in 2002 the first recipient of Randi Hultin Memorial Award. On the second album from his trio, Wistful (2004) he interpreted the ballad, "Theme for Thorgeir", dedicated to his guitar hero Thorgeir Stubø. Bluero (2006), was recorded in Rainbow Studio with Jan Erik Kongshaug mastering the sound.

His trio cooperated with the electronic band Bol for the NRK radio contribution to The EBU, "Jazz around the world" in 2003. This concert was broadcast to 18 countries. Here with bassist Steinar Raknes. Later Bjørn Alterhaug has been bassist of the trio on the albums Wistful (2004) and Bluero (2006), receiving ensemble support from Norsk Kulturråd in 2005, appeared at Moldejazz the same year, and at Vossajazz in 2006.

Pedersen has been a soloist with numerous ensembles, among them the Norsk Universal Orkester in 2003 (led by Lars Erik Gudim), at the Jubileums-varitéet, at Kongsberg Jazz Festival in 2004, and with the Sami artist Ingor Ánte Áilo Gaup (Áillos) at the Riddu Riđđu Festival (2003). He has collaborated on several of the projects with trumpeter Tore Johansen, including as a member of the Lars Gullin Tribute (2004–05). His guitar is heard on the third album from trumpeter Johansen, Windows (2003) with Roger Johansen on drums and Ole Morten Vågan on bass. Pedersen was selected to represent Norway at the International Bebop Guitar-meeting in 2006, along with a number of internationally formatted guitar counterparts, like Louis Stewart (Ireland), Martin Taylor (England) og Randy Johnston (USA).

Pedersen has from 2003 led a quartet with the Swedish saxophonist Bernt Rosengren, appearing on the Nordlysfestivalen in Tromsø, Nattjazz in Bergen, and Oslo Jazz Festival in 2003 (NRK P2 feature radio concert). In 2006, the Finnish alto saxophonist Jukka Perko, joined in for the commissioned work at Dølajazz. He has also cooperated in a Quartet with pianist Ivar Antonsen. At Moldejazz in 2005, he was described as "Jazz guitarist of ultimate format with a characteristic play."

Pedersen's latest project, Flight, is a quartet that includes Ivar Antonsen (piano), Bjørn Alterhaug (bass) and Roger Johansen (drums).

In 2010 and 2011 Hallgeir Pedersen was the musical leader for The Groove Valley Jazzcamp in Beiarn, Norway and in 2012 he had the same responsibility for the UrBand Camp, who were arranged for the first time in Arkhangelsk, Russia.

== Honors ==
- Randi Hultin Memorial Award 2002
- Stubøprisen 2007

== Discography ==
=== Solo albums ===
Within Hallgeir Pedersen Trio

- 2002: West Coast Blues (Ponca Jazz), with Konrad Kaspersen and Trond Sverre Hansen
- 2004: Wistful (Hot Club Records), with Bjørn Alterhaug and Trond Sverre Hansen
- 2006: Bluero (Ponca Jazz), with Bjørn Alterhaug and Trond Sverre Hansen

=== Collaborations ===
Within Flight (Quartet – Ivar Antonsen, Bjørn Alterhaug and Tore Johansen)

- 2010:Flight 17 Dec. (Ponca Jazz)

With Tore Johansen (Quartet – Ole Morten Vågan and Roger Johansen)

- 2003: Windows (Gemini Music)

With Terje Nilsen

- 2012: Gledeståra (Inner Ear)

Awards
Preceded by Tore Johansen	Recipient of the Stubøprisen; 2007	Succeeded by Finn Sletten
