= Somby =

Somby is a common Northern Sami surname.

The name has most likely been made as a Norwegian language adapted variation based on the Sami town of Sombio (or Sompio) in the Kemi region of north Finland. The name has probably also risen from the personal male name like Sompia, Sompi, Sombie, Sombe, Sombby, Sombi, Sumby and Sobbe. The name has been used as a family name written as Sombio, Sompio, Sombi and Somby.

Somby is the most common form today. It occurs basically in the northern Sami communities of Kautokeino Municipality and Karasjok Municipality on the Norwegian side of the border, but also in other northern-Scandinavian regions. The ancestor of the Somby family is Oloff Persson Sombio, registered in Kautokeino from 1697 to 1707.

There is a concentration of Sumby in and around Sunderland in the UK, the earliest recorded Sumby being a resident of the Parish of Bishopwearmouth in the mid 19th century. Since then the name can be found scattered throughout the UK, North America and Australia.

== Notable Sámi with the surname of Somby ==
- Ánde Somby (born 1958), author, yoiker, artist, and researcher
- Kai Somby (born ?), vocalist for the band Intrigue
- Liv Inger Somby (born 1962), educator, writer, and journalist
- Marry Ailonieida Somby (born 1953), children's author
- Mons Aslaksen Somby (1825–1854), reindeer herder and a leader of the Kautokeino rebellion
- Niillas Somby (a.k.a. Nils Somby; born 1948), journalist, photographer, political rights activist, and hunger striker

== Sources ==
- Kautokeinoslekter, by Adolf Steen. Renewed by Ola Aarseth (1986)
