= Stubøprisen =

Northern Norwegian jazz award

Stubøprisen (an Award initiated in 1989, in memory of the late guitar virtuoso and Northern Norway Enthusiast Thorgeir Stubø) is the highest honor given to a Northern Norwegian jazz musician. The award is given every second year to a person who makes or has made a special contribution to the Northern Norwegian Jazz Scene by the Thorgeir Stubø Memorial Fund (established 1987). The idea behind Thorgeir Stubø Memorial Fund is to honor a great jazz musician and simultaneously stimulate Northern Norwegian culture. The Stubøprisen Winners is awarded a grant of NKR 15 000 (2011) and a statuette created by the artist and sculptor Karl Erik Harr.

== Recipients of Stubøprisen ==
- 1989: Kjell Bartholdsen (saxophone) from Hammerfest
- 1991: Henning Gravrok from Bodø, 1 (saxophone)
- 1993: Marit Sandvik from Tromsø, 1993 (vocals)
- 1995: Øystein Norvoll from Tromsø, 1995 (guitar)
- 1997: Jan Gunnar Hoff from Bodø, 1997 (piano)
- 1999: Trond Sverre Hansen from Narvik (drums)
- 2001: Konrad Kaspersen from Tromsø, 1 (double bass)
- 2003: Øystein B. Blix from Tromsø (trombone)
- 2005: Tore Johansen from Bodø (trumpet)
- 2007: Hallgeir Pedersen from Øksfjord, 2007 (guitar)
- 2009: Finn Sletten from Bodø (drums)
- 2011: Jan Ditlev Hansen from Tromsø, 2011 (Music Journalist and author)
- 2013: Tim Chalman (saxophone & flute) from Texas, U.S.
- 2015: Oddmund Finnseth (double bass) from Sortland.
