= Vajas =

Sámi-Norwegian band

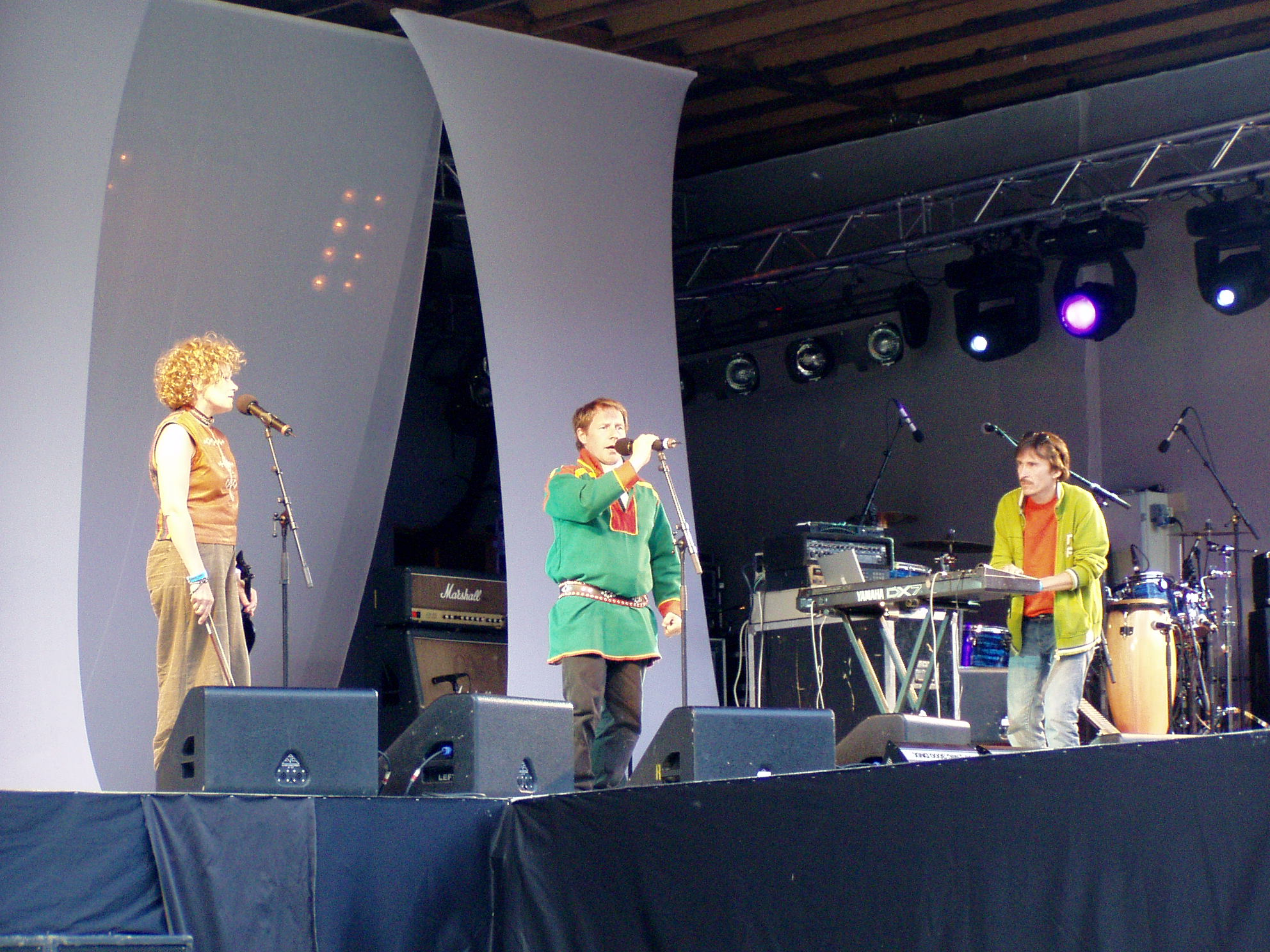
Vajas

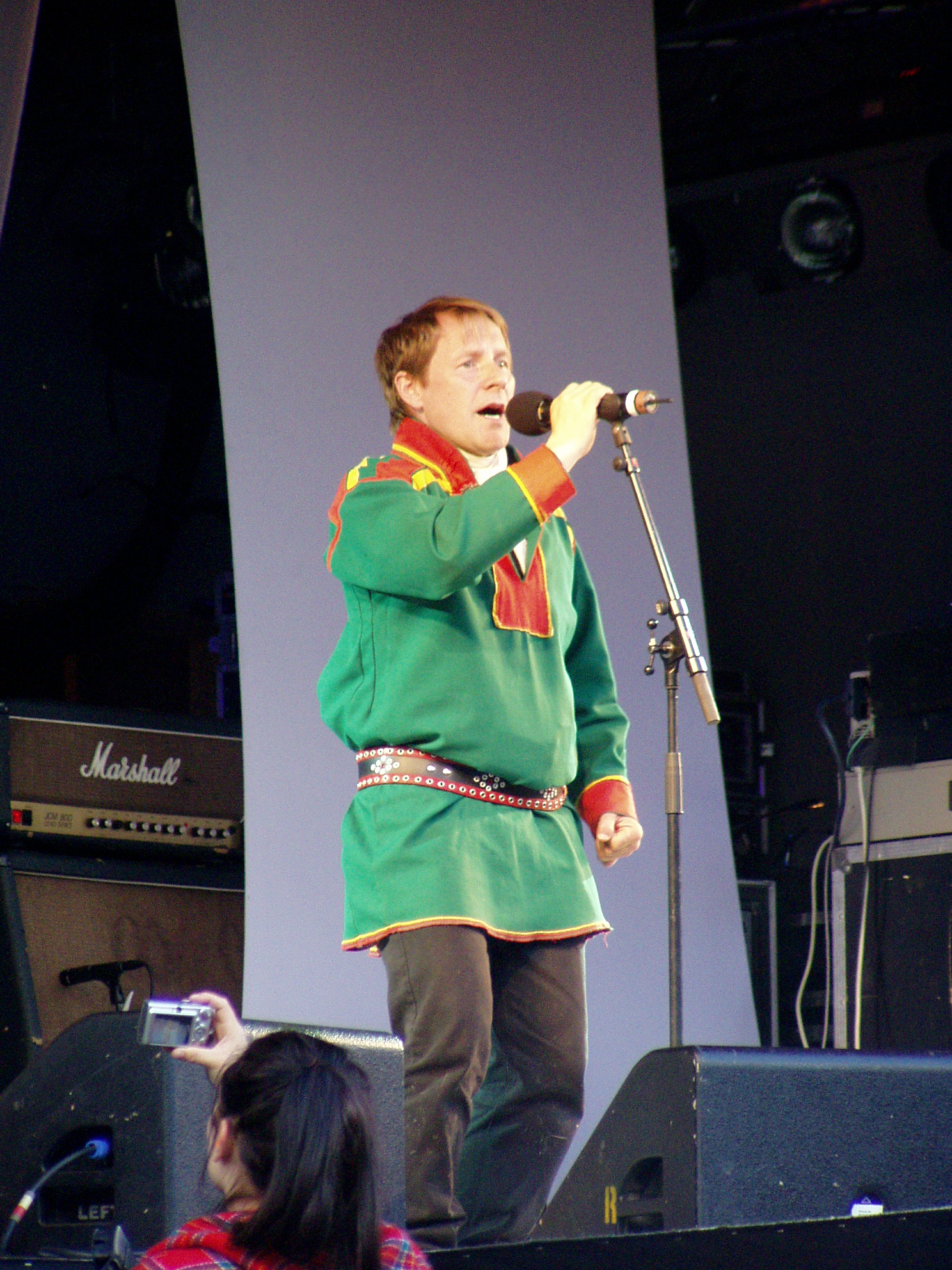
Ánde Somby joiking at the Riddu Riđđu festival in 2007

Vajas (meaning echo in North Sámi) was a Sámi-Norwegian band with Kristin Mellem on violin and vocals, Nils Johansen on guitars, computers and synthesizers and the famous Sami ethnic yoiker Ánde Somby on vocals and yoik (or joik, a type of traditional chanting or singing). The band debuted in 2003 and toured internationally. In October 2006 Vajas released its first album, Sacred Stone. The band is currently working on getting the release distributed in Germany and the UK with other countries to follow. In 2009, a minor YouTube fad involved remaking or lipsynching to the song "Sparrow of the Wind".

== Band members ==
Kristin Mellem is a classically trained composer and violinist who has done a lot of musical projects. She has composed and performed music both in smaller settings and with full orchestras.

Ánde Somby is both a traditional and non-traditional Sami yoiker (joiker) and has been performing since the late seventies. Somby also has a Ph.D. in Law and is a busy academic, employed at the University of Tromsø in Norway.

Nils Johansen is a musician, composer, artist and multiinstrumentalist and is also a member of the Norwegian pop/indie duo Bel Canto. Johansen has been a part of the international music industry since the mid eighties and has composed music for film, television and for full orchestras. He wrote the opening number to the debut of the Norwegian radio channel P3 and has done a lot of musical work outside his two bands.

== Personal life ==
Somby lived with Kristin Mellem from 2003 to 2007 and have one child together, born in 2005. From a former marriage Somby has two children, born in 1980 and 1988. Somby is the father of Lawra Somby, who yoiks in the duo Adjagas.

== Discography ==
- 2006 Sacred stone, Vaj AS/Musikkoperatørene, Norway
