= Nordlysprisen =

Norwegian music award

Nordlysprisen (the Northern Lights Prize, established in 1989) is an annual award presented by the newspaper Nordlys during the opening concert at Nordlysfestivalen in Tromsø, Norway. Nordlysprisen is awarded to a performing musician or composer, that through their work in Northern Norway has excelled at a high artistic level and therefore contributed to highlighting the region's musical life in a positive way. In 2013 the prize-winner was awarded 50 000 Norwegian kroner.

== Nordlysprisen winners ==
- 1989: Håkon Stødle (clarinet), from Porsanger
- 1990: Paul Wåhlberg (flute), from Gothenburg
- 1991: Tori Stødle (piano), from Oslo
- 1992: Tove Karoline Knutsen (vocals), from Torsken
- 1993: Arne Dagsvik (conductor and composer), from Åfjord
- 1994: Mari Boine (vocals), from Karasjok
- 1995: Bjørn Andor Drage (composer and concert organist), from Saltdal
- 1996: Bjarte Engeset (conductor), from Ørsta
- 1997: Arne Bjørhei (trumpet), from Troms
- 1998: Henning Gravrok (saxophone), from Tovik
- 1999: Geir Jensen (keyboards), from Tromsø
- 2000: Arvid Engegård (violin), from Bodø
- 2001: Malfred Hanssen (violin), from Bodø
- 2002: Knut Erik Sundquist (double bass), from Tromsø
- 2003: Ingor Ánte Áilo Gaup (joik and composer), from Kautokeino
- 2004: Ola Bremnes (troubadour), from Svolvær
- 2005: Susanne Lundeng (violin and fiddle), from Bodø
- 2006: Jan Gunnar Hoff (piano), from Bodø
- 2007: Anneli Drecker (vocals), from Tromsø
- 2008: Ragnar Rasmussen (conductor), from Vardø
- 2009: Marianne Beate Kielland (mezzo-soprano), from Lørenskog
- 2010: Bodvar Moe (double bass & composer), from Mo i Rana
- 2011: Marit Sandvik (vocals), from Harstad
- 2012: Inga Juuso (vocals), from Kautokeino
- 2013: Nils Anders Mortensen (piano), from Flekkefjord
- 2014: Anne-Lise Sollied Allemano (soprano), from Tromsø
- 2015: Ragnar Olsen, (folk singer, songwriter), from Tromsø
- 2016: Ketil Vea and Sigmund Lillebjerka
- 2017: Terje Nilsen
- 2018: Ragnhild Furebotten
- 2019: Roger Ludvigsen
- 2020: Jens Christian Kloster
- 2021: Ola Graff
