= Boknakaran =

Norwegian musical group

Boknakaran is a Norwegian musical group consisting of Ragnar Olsen, Jan Arvid Johansen, Malvin Skulbru and Pål Thorstensen. Helge Stangnes wrote the lyrics to many of their songs, and has been referred to within the group as "the fifth boknakar". They have released six albums, and have toured a lot in Northern Norway.

Boknakaran collaborated with fiddle player Julie Alapnes to make their sixth album, "Kortreist Musikk".
