= Randi Hultin =

- Born: Randi Winnifred Linden; 9 January 1926; Oslo, Norway
- Died: 18 March 2000 (aged 74); Oslo, Norway
- Spouse: Tor Hultin
- Musical career
- Origin: Norway
- Occupation: Journalist

Randi Winnifred Hultin, née Linden (9 January 1926 – 17 March 2000), was an internationally renowned Norwegian jazz critic and impresario.

== Biography ==
Hultin studied art under the guidance of Per Krohg and was an educated visual artist. Through her spouse, jazz pianist Tor Hultin, she arranged jam sessions with visiting jazz musicians such as Count Basie, Stan Kenton, Dizzy Gillespie, Roy Eldridge, Stan Getz and Ray Brown. Later she was on her own, hosting Keith Jarrett, Charles Lloyd Quartet, Phil Woods, Sonny Clark, Hampton Hawes, Jaki Byard, Tommy Flanagan, Dexter Gordon, Chet Baker, Louis Armstrong and Eubie Blake.

In addition to her work in Norsk Hydro (1945–93), Verdensrevyen issued her illustrations and she wrote a number of reviews of Filmjournalen (1958-), Dagbladet (1960–83), Aftenposten (until 1990), eventually the NRK. She wrote for international journals including Jazz Forum (Poland), Jazz Journal International (England) and the U.S. DownBeat, and in every year for Norwegian «Jazznytt».

She died of cancer in 2000. The following year, «Randi Hultins Stiftelse» was established. It is responsible for, among other things, presentation of the annual Randi Hultin Minnepris. Hallgeir Pedersen received the first award in 2002. The residence at Gartnerveien 6 in Oslo is intended for use as a jazz museum.

A number of composers dedicated works to Hultin, among them

- Eubie Blake: "Randi's Rag" (1977),
- Phil Woods: "Randi",
- Silje Nergaard: "Port of Call" (2000),
- Dave Brubeck: "Elegy" (2001), and
- Jon Eberson: "Ballade for Randi" (Standards, 2003).

A television series was made in 1989, called Randi's Jazz, which was also shown in New York City.

Her biography Born Under the Sign of Jazz was published in 1998.

== Honours ==
- 1970: «Molderosen» at the Moldejazz
- 1995: «Ella-prisen» at the «Oslo Jazzfestival»
- 1998: «Kongens fortjenestemedalje» in gold

== Bibliography ==
- Randi Hultin (1991). I jazzens tegn. Aschehoug.
- Randi Hutlin (1998). Born under the sign of jazz. Sanctuary Publ., London. pp. 1–399).
