= Oddmund Finnseth =

Norwegian jazz musician (born 1957)

- Born: Oddmund Jarle Finnseth; 11 February 1957 (age 69); Sortland, Nordland
- Origin: Norway
- Genres: Jazz
- Occupations: Jazz musician, composer, music educator
- Instrument: Upright bass

Oddmund Jarle Finnseth (born 11 February 1957 in Sortland, Norway) is a Norwegian jazz musician (upright bass), composer and music teacher.

== Biography ==
Finnseth studied music on the Jazz program at Trondheim musikkonservatorium (1983–86) and joined the Asmund Bjørken Orchestra during the time of his studies. Later he has recorded albums with 'Bjørn Krokfoss Octet' and the band 'Bossa Nordpå' (1993–) of Marit Sandvik. He was part of the Randy Johnston tour, led by Øystein Norvoll for the 'Nordnorsk Jazzsenter' (2002).

Finnseth teaches music at the high school 'Sortland videregående skole' in Sortland Municipality and 'Heggen videregående skole' in Harstad Municipality, and play in the bands 'Sortland Storband' and 'Steinar Kjeldsen Quartet'. He was portreted by Andreas Lunnan in the radio show Sølvsuper, at NRK radio in 2007, and was awarded the Stubøprisen 2015.

== Honors ==
- 2015: Stubøprisen awarded during Festspillene i Nordnorge

== Discography ==
With Arvid Genius

- 1983: Rainy City Swing (Herman Records)

With Sven Nyhus & Asmund Bjørken Sextet

- 2008: Bergroser Og Frøsøminner (Heilo Music)
