= Yoiking with the Winged Ones =

Album by Ánde Somby

Yoiking with the Winged Ones is a polyphonic sound project by Ánde Somby. In the recording, Somby performs yoiking, the ancient chanting practise of the Sámi People of northern Europe, in concert with the sounds of nature. The album edition of the project was released by Ash International as a vinyl record in January 2016. Yoiking with the Winged Ones is also presented as an art installation. Røst Air and Ny Musikk in collaboration with Tromsø Kunstforening had a show from 22 May to 4 June 2017.

The project is performed and produced by Ánde Somby, an artist with experience in the yoik tradition.

The title references to 3 inspirations. The first is the traditional story that the underground fairies (gufihttarat) were the ones that taught the Sámi people to yoik. The second inspiration is the Norwegian song Nisser og Dverge. That song is according to Somby the start of Norway's war against their own fairies and elf and thereby the earth that has a soul. The third inspiration is the myth about Narcissus and Echo.

== Reception ==
The LP Yoiking with the Winged Ones has been reviewed in Somby's native language Sámi as well as in Danish and Norwegian. The album is reviewed also in Italian, German, French, Dutch, Japanese, and English.

According to PassiveAggressive, he is almost on the border of the human voice. Somby's yoiking has been described as having the energy that punk rock had before it was tamed in the music studios, with Klassekampen comparing Somby's work to that of the English punk band Cockney Rejects.

== Track listing ==
No.	Title	Music	Length
1.	"Gufihttar" ("Underworld Fairie")	Somby	5:07
2.	"Gádni" ("Spirit of the Mountain")	Somby	3:56
3.	"Neahkkameahttun" ("From the Other Side")	Somby	10:31
4.	"Wolf"	Traditional	17:42

In yoiks, there can sometimes be epic lyrics containing long narratives. Other times, there can be poetic texts. There can also be no lyrics at all. In this project, there are no lyrics.

== Production ==
The recordings and post production were by Chris Watson, a sound artist and sound recordist from Newcastle upon Tyne. The sampling of sounds took place in Kvalnes, Lofoten in June 2014.

The artist A K Dolven, living in Kvalnes and London has been instrumental and important in developing the concept, and produced the album's cover art. The production was supported by the Sami Parliament of Norway.
