= Jan Ditlev Hansen =

- Born: 26 March 1946 (age 79); Trondheim, Sør-Trøndelag
- Occupation: Journalist & program host

Jan Ditlev Hansen (born 26 March 1946 in Trondheim, Norway) is a Norwegian Jazz journalist and program host at the NRK. He is married to Cand.polit Randi Marie Haugland, at University of Tromsø.

== Career ==
Hansen has been closely involved in northern Norwegian jazz for 40 years. First in the Harstad as secretary and director of Nordnorsk Jazzforum in the early 1970s, then in Vadsø, in which he was master of ceremonies during the first Varangerfestivalen in 1982. Since 1978 he has worked for the Norwegian Broadcasting Corporation, and has made numerous radio and television programs about the northern Norwegian jazz. From 1997 he has been living in Tromsø, where he produces his weekly Rundt midnatt (Around midnight) for the NRK P2. He is also part of the NRK Jazz editorial. Hansen has written journalistic books, articles, and local historical writings, including the jazz.

== Honors ==
- 2011: «Stubøprisen»
- 2013: «Molderosen» at the Moldejazz

== Bibliography ==
- Jan Ditlev Hansen (2010). Nordlands trompet - Sax, piano, gitar, bass, trommer og vokal - Nordnorsk jazz gjennom 90 år. Margbok.

Awards
Preceded by Finn Sletten	Recipient of the Stubøprisen; 2011	Succeeded by Tim Challman
