= Ánde Somby =

Saami lawyer, writer and musician

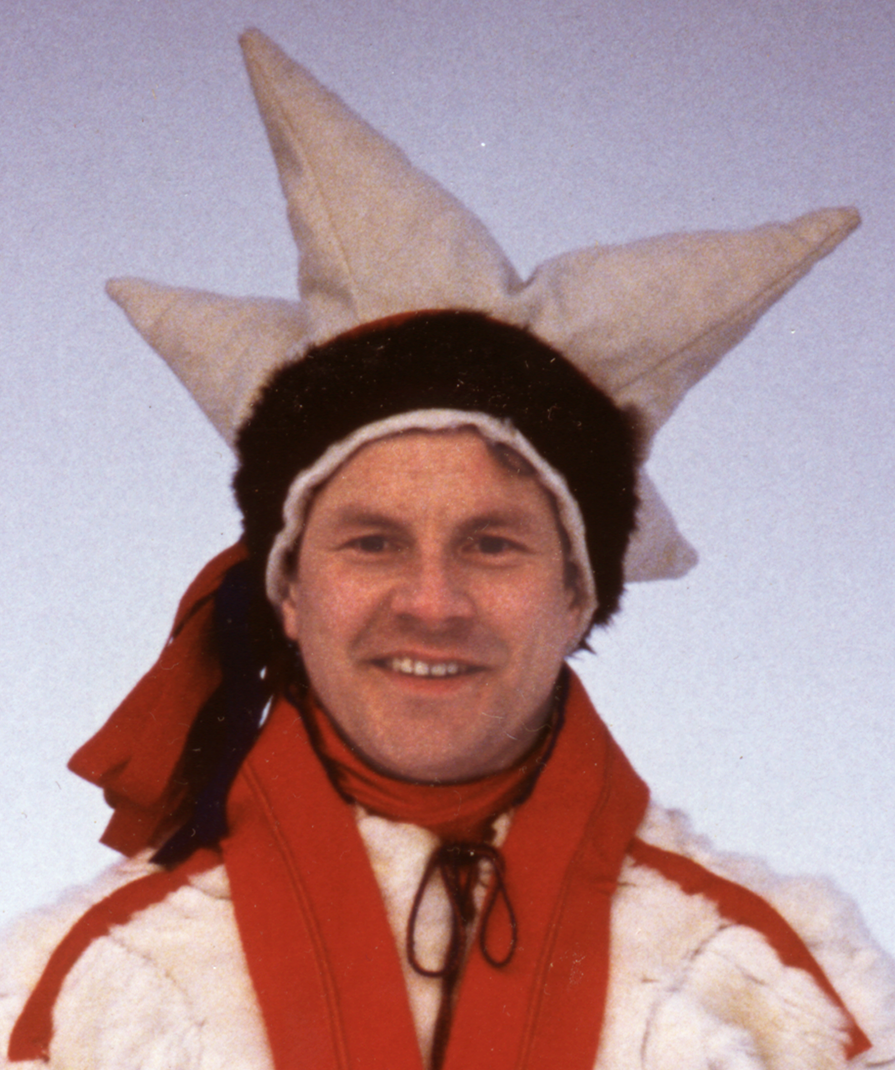
- Somby wearing a Beaska in 1991.
- Born: 12 May 1958 (age 67); Buolbmat, Norway
- Occupations: Sami writer, musician, artist, University Researcher.

Ánde Somby (born 12 May 1958) is a traditional Sami joik artist and an associate professor at the Faculty of Law at the University of Tromsø, specializing in Indigenous Rights Law.

Somby has been active yoiker since 1974. He has also been producing records with other yoikers. In 1985 he produced the LP record and MC cassette "Ean Máššan" with his father Aslak Somby (1913–2008) and mother Karen Kristine Porsanger Somby born 1920. in 1991 he produced the record Ravddas Ravdii with Inga Juuso. In 2000 he produced the record "Deh" and in 2003 Deh2 with his uncle Ivvár Niillas.

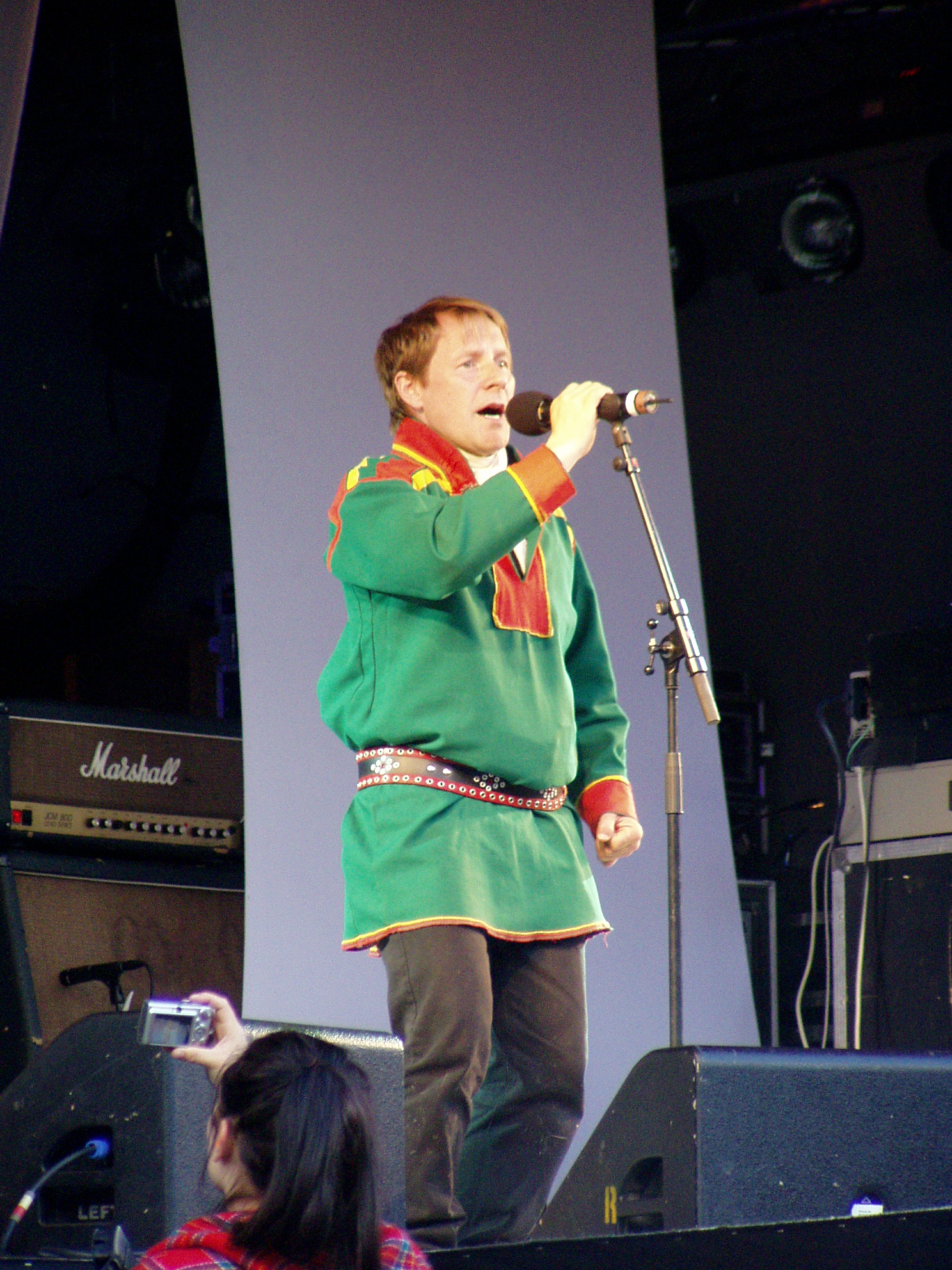
Somby onstage as part of Vajas during the Riddu Riđđu Festival in Norway, 2007

Somby is only one of few Sami with Ph.D. in law (dr. juris). Somby's Ph.D. is titled "Juss som retorikk". In that thesis he reconnected the Nordic jurisprudence to the classical rhetorical tradition which dates back to Plato and Aristotle. In 2009, Somby was working on a project titled "Is the legal medium the legal message?", in which he attempted to apply Marshall McLuhan's mantra on the medium being the message to jurisprudence.

Somby is also one of the cofounders of the Sámi publishing house and record label Dat. Together with the band Boknakaran from Tromsø and the a cappella group Rosynka from Petrozavodsk in Russia Somby participated in the project "moya på Tvoja" (1998–2002). From 2003 to 2007 Somby was a member of the group Vajas (in English it means echo) and was the vocals and yoiker for the band.

== See also ==
- Somby (surname)
- Yoiking with the Winged Ones
