= Tore Johansen =

Norwegian jazz trumpeter (born 1977)

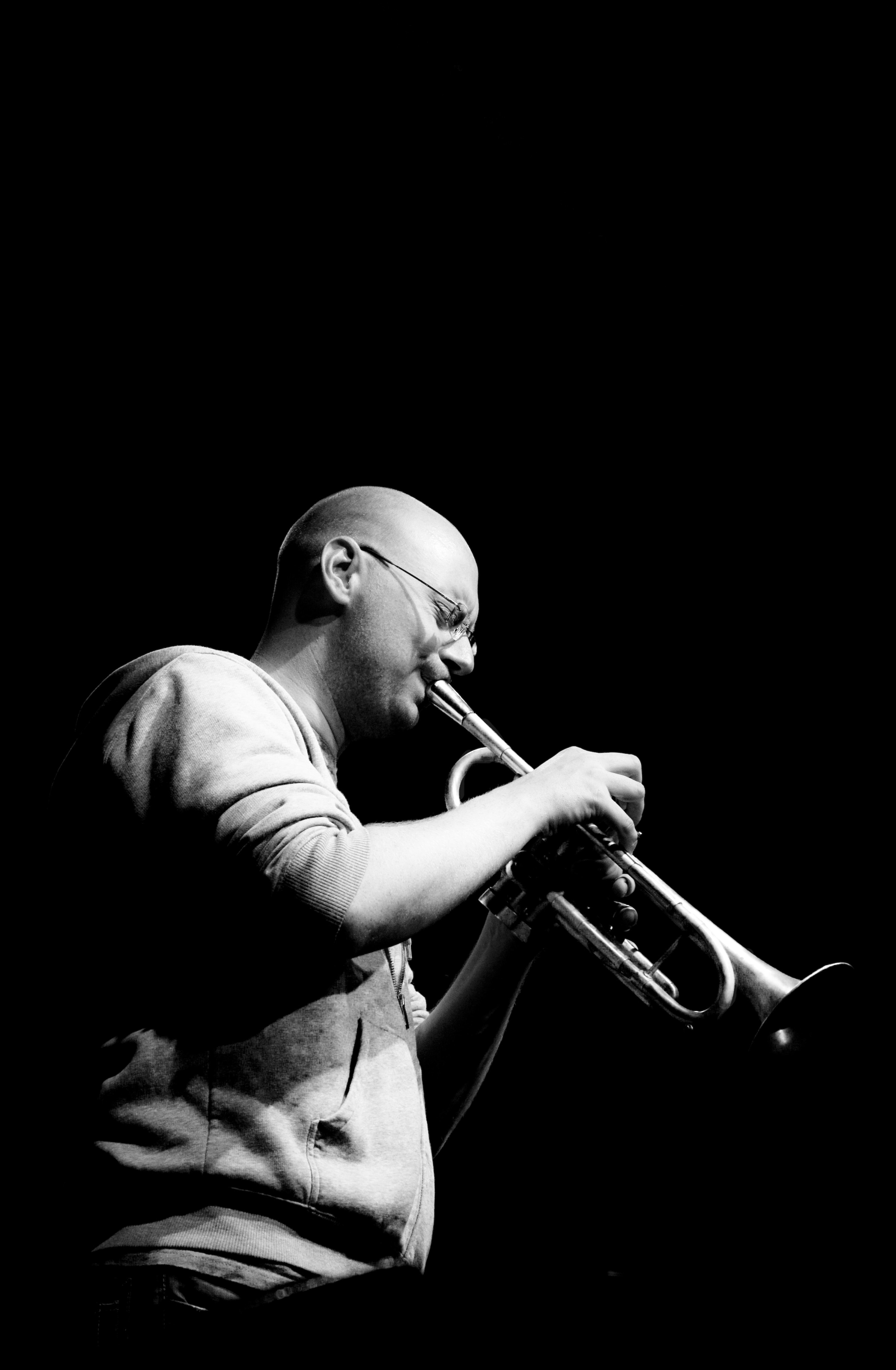
- Tore Johansen in 2009

Background information
- Born: 23 December 1977 (age 48); Bodø, Nordland, Norway
- Genres: Jazz
- Occupation: Musician
- Instrument: Trumpet
- Label: Inner Ear
- Website: torejazz.no

Tore Johansen (born 23 December 1977) is a Norwegian jazz trumpeter and the younger brother of drummer Roger Johansen. He has worked with Chick Corea, Karin Krog, Kenny Wheeler, Steve Swallow, Lars Jansson, Hal Galper, Siri Gellein, and Jan Gunnar Hoff.

== Career ==
Johansen was born in Bodø. As a teenager, he played in the Bodø Jazz Quintet with his brother Roger Johansen and saxophonist Atle Nymo. In 1994 he started his first band with his brother, Terje Venaas (double bass,) and Einar Thorbjørnsen (piano), and joined Bodø Big Band (1994–96) led by saxophonist Henning Gravrok.

He was educated at Trondheim Musikkonservatorium where he became a lecturer. He has played with the Swedish saxophonist Nisse Sandström and has appeared with Karin Krog. He has performed with Swedish pianist Lars Jansson and the Finnish alto saxophonist Jukka Perko. With American pianist Hal Galper he recorded at Norwegian radio NRK P2 for the program Jazzklubben (2004) from the jazz club Blå in Oslo. He toured with Trondheim Jazz Orchestra and Chick Corea in the U.S., Scandinavia, and Japan. This was documented on the album at Midtnorsk Jazzsenters' s label, MNJ Records. Other collaborators include Kenny Wheeler in 2008 and Steve Swallow in 2009.

Johansen often works with musicians from Northern Norway, e.g. with Bjørn Alterhaug (double bass), Jan Gunnar Hoff (piano), Finn Sletten (drumes) and Ole Morten Vågan (bass). With Ole Morten Vågan he was part of guitarist Hallgeir Pedersen's Trio at Moldejazz in 2002. This band was extended to a quartet, including his brother Roger Johansen (drums). They performed with Norwegian folk singer Terje Nilsen at Trondheim Jazz Festival in 2006 and the nonet Lars Gullin tribute with John Pål Inderberg (baritone saxophone) and Lars Sjösten (piano). Johansen has also worked extensively in a duo format with pianist Vigleik Storaas, documented on Rainbow Session (2007).

== Award and honors ==
- 2002: Nordlandsprofil at Nordland Musikkfestuke
- 2002: Nordnorsk Jazzsenter's trainee scheme 2002-2004
- 2005: Norsk Kulturråd's ensemble support
- 2005: Recipient of the Stubøprisen

== Discography ==
- Man, Woman and Child (Gemini, 2000)
- Happy Days (Gemini, 2002)
- Windows (Gemini, 2003)
- Like That (Gemini, 2005)
- Rainbow Session (Inner Ear, 2007)
- Thad Jones Tribute (Normann, 2008)
- Jazz Mass (Inner Ear, 2009)
- I.S. (Inner Ear, 2010)
- Natt, Stille (Inner Ear, 2010)
- Nord (Inner Ear, 2011)
- Double Rainbow (Inner Ear, 2012)
- Open Minds (Inner Ear, 2012)
- Cherbourg Peninsula with Verøna (Bruit Chic - BC007, 2013)
- Alvin Pang with Endre Lund Eriksen (Inner X, 2013)
- The Set (Inner Ear, 2014)
- Earth Stills (Inner Ear, 2015)
- Sang (Inner Ear, 2020)

Awards
Preceded by Øystein B. Blix	Recipient of the Stubøprisen; 2005	Succeeded by Hallgeir Pedersen
