= Jan Arvid Johansen =

Norwegian musician

Jan Arvid Johansen (18 June 1947, in Havøysund – 7 October 2017) was a Norwegian musician. He was a graduate of the Nordnorsk Musikkonservatorium (1976–79).

Johansen recorded with such groups as Erter, Kjøtt og Flesk (1973) and Nordnorsk Visegruppe (1975–1980) and he worked at the Hålogaland Teater (1979–1981) and with the performing group Tramteateret (1985). He worked with the lyricist Helge Stangnes, and such artists as Sverre Kjelsberg, Trygve Henrik Hoff, and Tove Karoline Knutsen, played Irish music in the group "Rebels", been a part of Forente Artister's "Sammen for Livet" (1985) and "Visehjelp til Nordvest-Russland" (1998). He established and released many records with the group Boknakaran.

His solo album, Tonen & Kjærligheten, was released in 2005; the song "Tirilltungetid" reached number one on the Norsktoppen.
