= Marit Sandvik =

Norwegian jazz singer (born 1956)

- Born: 19 July 1956 (age 70); Harstad, Troms, Norway
- Genres: Jazz
- Occupation: Singer
- Instrument: Vocals
- Spouse: Øystein Norvoll
- Website: www.instagram.com/maritsandvikmusic/

Marit Sandvik (born 19 July 1956) is a Norwegian jazz singer. She is notable for winning the Stubøprisen award, given to a Norwegian jazz singer, in 1993, and the Nordlysprisen award, given to a contributor to the music of Northern Norway, in 2011. She was born in Harstad.

== Career ==
Sandvik has participated in numerous vocal and jazz groups in Harstad, Trondheim and Tromsø. In 1993, Sandvik established the sextet "Bossa Nordpå" including Helge Sveen, Henning Gravrok, Øystein Norvoll, Oddmund Finnseth and Finn Sletten. In 1997, she established the "Norvoll/Sandvik Duo" together with her husband, guitarist Øystein Norvoll, and was a part of the vocal quartet "Plagiacci", which in 1998 set up the Hasse & Tage revue Spader, Madam!. With her own quintet Marit Sandvik Band (established 1998), including Henning Gravrok, Eivind Valnes, Sigurd Ulveseth and Finn Sletten) She has toured internationally.

== Honors ==
- 1993: Stubøprisen
- 2011: Nordlysprisen

== Personal life ==
Sandvik's husband is guitarist Øystein Norvoll and their daughter is Dagny, a singer. She lives in Tromsø, having moved there in 1986.

== Discography ==
=== Solo albums ===
- 1995: Song, Fall Soft (Taurus), with "Jazz i Nord"
- 2002: Even Then (Mother Song) (Taurus), with Marit Sandvik Band
- 2005: Uma Onda No Mar (Taurus), with Bossa Nordpå
- 2016: Travel (AlfaMusic), with Maurizio Giammarco
- 2017: Gå, Sveve (Turn Left), composer and lyricist Brynjulf Bjørklid

=== Collaborative works ===
- 2001: Distant Reports
- 2005: Tonen og Kjærligheten, with Jan Arvid Johansen
- 2005: Evening Songs, with Roger Johansen
- 2007: World of Emily, with Roger Johansen
- 2007: Q, with Henning Gravrok
- 2010: Krig og kjærlighet, with Jørgen Nordeng/Joddskis
- 2010: Natt, stille, with Tore Johansen
- 2011: Nord, with Tore Johansen

=== Contributions ===
She contributes on the album Distant Reports (2001) facilitated by "Nordnorsk Jazzforum", Tonen og Kjærligheten (2005) with Jan Arvid Johansen, Evening Songs (2005) and World of Emily (2007) with Roger Johansen, Q (2009) with Henning Gravrok, Krig og kjærlighet (2010) with Jørgen Nordeng/Joddskis, Natt, stille (2010) and Nord (2011) with Tore Johansen. She led "Tromsø Jazzklubb" (1990–1996).

Awards
Preceded by Henning Gravrok	Recipient of the Stubøprisen; 1993	Succeeded by Øystein Norvoll
Preceded by Bodvar Moe	Recipient of the Nordlysprisen; 2011	Succeeded by Inga Juuso
