= Finn Sletten =

Norwegian jazz musician (born 1952)

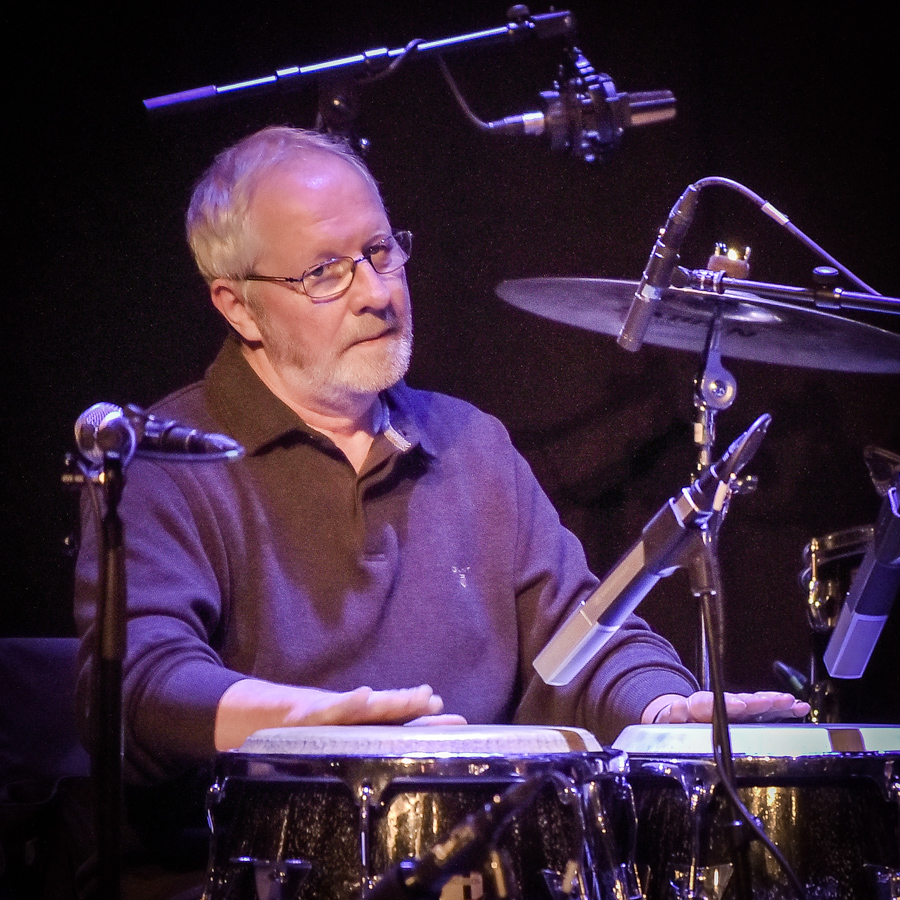
- Credit: Lasse Brown (2017)

Background information
- Born: 11 August 1952 (age 73); Bodø, Nordland
- Origin: Norway
- Genres: Jazz
- Occupations: Musician, composer
- Instrument: Drums

Finn Sletten (born 11 August 1952) is a Norwegian jazz musician (drums and percussions).

== Career ==
Sletten was born in Bodø. After a study tour to Arizona (1968–70), he played in his home town with such musicians as Paul Weeden Band at Festival of North Norway (1972) and an album (1974). In Oslo he participated in Magni Wentzel Quintet, including Jon Eberson (guitar), Tore Brunborg (saxophone) and Jon Balke (keyboards) among others. From 1988 he was involved in "Trio Nord" (1988), Ola Bremness Vær hilset! (1995), Marit Sandvik band, Nordland jazzforums Distant Reports (2001), Tore Johansen and Jan Gunnar Hoff's production Free Flows (2005).

Sletten assisted the jazz poet Triztán Vindtorn with percussion on Cecilie Jordal (2001)., a portion of the presentation "Philosophiske Smuler". He also contributes to the Bodø Domkor's Christmas jazz and Beiarn jazz camp, and was recently on contributor Kristin Mellem and Bjørn Andor Drage's film music to Nærkontakt med brunbjørn.

Sletten was at the Festival of North Norway 2009 awarded Stubøprisen to have been "a significant pioneer and inspiration to generations of north Norwegian jazz musicians". That same year he also received the prestigious Gammleng-prisen in the class jazz by "Fond for utøvende kunstnere".

== Honors ==
- 2009: Stubøprisen
- 2009: Gammleng-prisen in the class Jazz

== Discography ==
With Morten Halle, Jon Eberson & Bjørn Kjellemyr

- 1990: Blow! (Odin Records)
- 1992: 2 (Curling Legs)

Awards
Preceded by Hallgeir Pedersen	Recipient of the Stubøprisen; 2009	Succeeded by Jan Ditlev Hansen
Preceded by Jon Balke	Recipient of the Jazz Gammleng Award; 2009	Succeeded by no Jazz award
