= Helmut Müller-Brühl =

German conductor

Helmut Peter Müller-Brühl (28 June 1933 – 2 January 2012) was a German conductor.

Müller-Brühl was a pupil of Hermann Abendroth, founder of the Cologne Chamber Orchestra. In 1958, Müller-Brühl invited this orchestra to be the principal orchestra for concerts given at his family home, Schloss Brühl. In 1964, the orchestra's conductor, Erich Kraak, invited Müller-Brühl to be chief conductor, and Müller-Brühl led the orchestra until 2008. He also successfully collaborated with Takako Nishizaki on the “Discovery” album of violin concertos by the Chevalier de Saint-Georges. Müller-Brühl died on 2 January 2012 following a long illness. He was 78.
