= Bodvar Moe =

Norwegian musician

Bodvar Drotninghaug Moe (born 31 March 1951) is a Norwegian composer, musician (bass) and music teacher.

Moe was born in Mo i Rana. He studied composition under Olav Anton Thommessen, Bjørn Kruse, Jan Sandström and Rolf Martinson. Moe has been the musical director of Nordland Teater and has remained a central participant in the "Composer Meeting northern Scandinavia." Since 2005 he has been the musical director for Mo Orkesterforening. By Nesna University College, he was named amanuensis in 2005 and was promoted to professor in 2011.

== Awards ==
- Rana Municipality Culture (1989)
- Nordlysprisen (2010)
- Nordland County's Culture (2011)

== Works ==
Some of his works include:

- "Jedermann" opera. Performed on Ramberg in Lofoten 2008 and released on CD (Euridice: EUCD60) in 2011
- "Skjømmingsmesse" for choir and string (2003)
- "Caritas" for choir, percussion, clarinet and cello (2009)
- "Stories from the north" for saxophone and percussion (2010)
- Tang mellom tærn, screenplay by Stig Bang, the first musical by Nordland Teater
- Romeo og Julie, screenplay by Stig Bang, music, Nordland Teater (1990).
- Min Vemods Fryd, folk music with Ove Larsen and Jan Henrik Larsen (Euridice, 1996)
- Kyssan i Snorres gate, for he town of Narvik's 100th anniversary (2002)
- Friendly Alien from Mars, percussion concerto, premiered by Rolf Lennart Stensø and Bodø Sinfonietta at the festival Mørke Nu in Bodø (2004)
- Drømmene Lever, to an audiovisual fremsyning with photographer artist Ketil Born
- The Three Gunas, on CD with guitar trio Arne Brattland, Trond Davidsen and Jarl Strømdal in Arctic Guitar Trio
- The Anne-Guri Shopping Piece, dedicated Anne Guri Frøystein (2004). Special works to Havmanndagene (2002)
- Tone setting to Radioteatrets staging of (2004) by Tove Jansson, Mummipappa på eventyr, and Henrik Ibsen, En folkefiende. Both released on an audiobook from NRK Lydbokforlaget
- Juff II, for euphonium and orchestra, written for the Finnish Jukka Myllys and premiered at the Arctic Trombone and Lowbrass Festival in 2007
