= Trygve Henrik Hoff =

Norwegian musician, writer, and conductor (1938–1987)

Trygve Hoff
- Born: 7 July 1938; Rognan, Norway
- Died: 2 December 1987 (aged 49)
- Occupations: Singer, songwriter, writer, composer, conductor

Trygve Henrik Hoff (7 July 1938 – 2 December 1987) was a Norwegian singer, composer, songwriter, and writer. He was a teacher at Buskerud folkehøgskole (Heimtun) for many years when he lived in Darbu in Øvre Eiker Municipality. For some time, Trygve Hoff was the conductor of the Berlevåg Mannsangforening, based in Berlevåg Municipality.

Hoff was born and raised in Rognan in Saltdal Municipality in Nordland county, Norway. His work as a writer and artist showed an appreciation of his roots, and he found inspiration for his texts from his home in Northern Norway. Hoff was awarded the Nordland fylkes kulturpris (Nordland County Culture award) posthumously in 1988.

The newspaper Nordlys and the television channel NRK named Hoff's Snart gryr en dag as the best North Norwegian compilation albums of all time. Hoff's songs often depicted the way of living in Northern Norway. He described the women working in the fish fillet industry in Jentan på fileten, and wrote several songs for other artists. Hoff toured Northern Norway frequently.

"Har en drøm" and "Ei hand å holde i" are songs that were given to Jørn Hoel, and were major hits in Norway. Sissel Kyrkjebø's debut record Sissel contains five songs written by Trygve Hoff: Tenn et lys, I ditt smil» and «Dagen gryr» (composed by Svein Gundersen) as well as Inn til deg (composed by Lars Muh) and «Det skal lyse en sol» (composed by Lasse Holm). "Trygve Hoff's shows are characterized by an unvarnished joy of life."

Trygve Hoff had three children: Ståle, Stig Henrik, and Siv Elisabeth. Ståle Hoff was, like Trygve, a skilled musician. He contributed to several of his father's recordings, and together with Terje Blickfeldt, he composed «Folk e så bra». Stig Henrik Hoff and Siv Elisabeth Hoff are well-established actors. Trygve Hoff was buried at Fiskum Church.

== Discography ==
- 1979 Kokfesk
- 1980 Fokti
- 1980 Rækved og lørveblues
- 1983 Dele med dæ
- 1985 Midt i livet
- 1988 Snart gryr en dag (compilation)
- 1993 Lån mæ no'n tima (compilation)
- 1994 Trygve Hoff (album) (released by Televerket)
- 1995 Trollfjell her i nord (Audiobook. Collaboration with Karl Erik Harr)
- 2008 Kokfesk & Ballader (samleplate) (best of compilation)

=== Selected recordings by other artist ===
Albums by other artists containing songs written by Trygve Hoff:

- 1986 Sissel Kyrkjebø – Sissel
- 1987 Jørn Hoel – Varme ut av is
- 1988 Solfrid Hoff (now Solfrid Nilsen) – Prinsessa i tårnet
- 1994 Sissel Kyrkjebø – Amazing Grace
- 1995 Bodø-oktetten – Nocturne i Nord
- 1995 Jørn Hoel – Jørn Hoels beste

== Bibliography ==
- 1981 Kokfesk, ballader og lørveblues
- 1982 Trollfjell her nord. Later available as audio-book, read by Trygve Hoff himself.
- 1984 Eventyr langs leia
- 1985 Lyset i mørketida
- 1983 Villblomar i visehagen (editor)

== Trygve Hoff's memorial fund and memorial award ==
The Trygve Hoff memorial fund was established on 12 February 1988, two months following his death. The fund receives capital through memorial concerts, public grants, donations and gifts. The fund was established in order to award the Trygve Hoff memorial award. This award is given to a person, or group of persons, that contribute to the cultural life in the spirit of Trygve Hoff.

Trygve Hoff's memorial award

- 1989 Norsk Revyfestival
- 2000 Bente Reibo
- 2004 Bjørn Andor Drage
- 2006 Alt for Rognan
- 2008 Kristin Mellem
