= Jukka Perko =

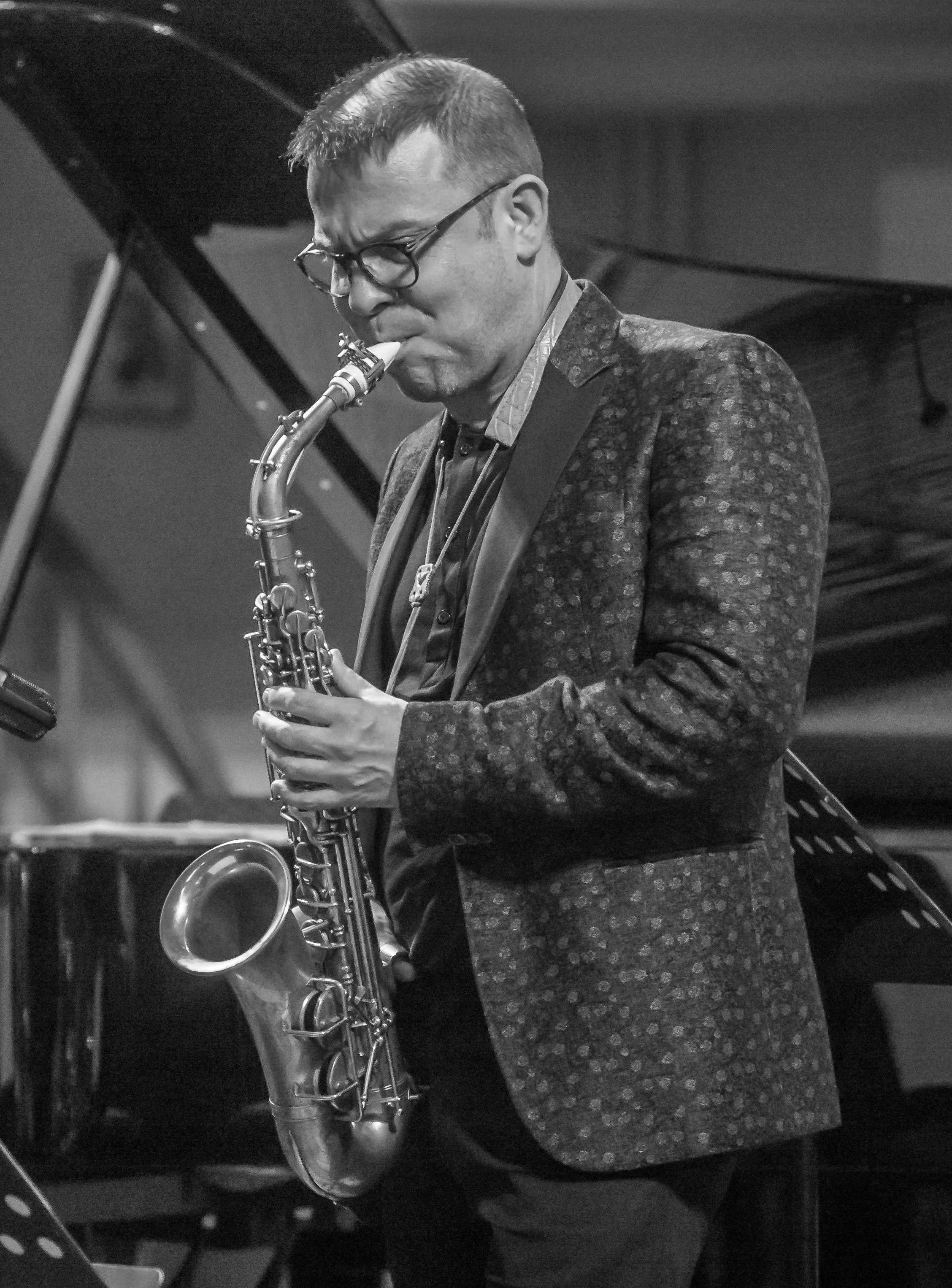

Background information
- Born: 18 February 1968 (age 57); Huittinen, Finland
- Origin: Finnish
- Genres: Jazz, Classical music
- Occupation(s): Musician, composer
- Instrument: Saxophone

Jukka Perko (born 18 February 1968 in Huittinen, Finland) is a Finnish saxophonist.

== Biography ==
Perko first became known in Finland by playing at the 1986 Pori Jazz Festival. His international career started when he played in the big band of Dizzy Gillespie the following year, with which he toured in the following two years through the US and Europe. In addition at this time he studied music at the Sibelius Academy. Dort Lernte is the Vibraphonist known by Severi Pyysalo, by which he regularly collaborated.

In the period 1989 to 1994 Perko played with the UMO Jazz Orchestra, afterwards he concentrated on his solo career. He led different bands (including the Trio Perko-Pyysalo-Viinikainen) and collaborated with musicians like McCoy Tyner, Red Rodney and Niels-Henning Ørsted Pedersen among others. In addition he works as an interpreter of classical music with orchestras such as the Helsinki Philharmonic Orchestra and the Avanti-Chamber Orchestra. Since 1990 he has been teaching at the Sibelius Academy.

== Discography ==
=== Solo albums ===
- 1989: Portrait by Heart (Andania), with Jukka Perko Quartet (Kirmo Lintinen, Eerik Siikasaari, Marko Timonen)
- 2000: Music of Olavi Virta (Blue Note), with Hurmio-Orkesteri (Manuel Dunkel, Lasse Lindgren, Teppo Mäkynen)
- 2002: Kaanaamaa (Blue Note)
- 2004: Kuunnelmia (Blue Note), with Severi Pyysalo, Teemu Viinikainen
- 2006: Retrospective (Blue Note)
- 2008: Maan Korvessa (Levypallo), with Severi Pyysalo, Teemu Viinikainen
- 2008: Profeetta (Columbia), with Mikko Kuustonen
- 2011: Avara (Blue Note)
- 2012: Streamline Jazztet (Blue Note)
- 2013: Martan Ja Rudolfin Joulu (EMI), with Johanna Iivanainen
- 2016: Invisible Man (ACT), with Jarmo Saari, Teemu Viinikainen
- 2017: Dizzy (We Jazz Records), with Jukka Perko Tritone

=== Collaborations ===
With Jukka Linkola Band

- 1992: Snowlight (YLE Radiomafia)

With The Poppoo

- 1993: Garden of Time (Chandos Records), with Severi Pyysalo, Marko Timonen, Eerik Siiksaari, Mongo Aaltonen
- 1995: Uuno Kailas (Ondine Octopus), with Vesa-Matti Loiri, Severi Pyysalo, Eerik Siikasaari, Marko Timonen, Jarmo Saari
- 1998: Varia (Pori Jazz Productions), with Severi Pyysalo, Ville Houlman, Teppo Mäkynen

With Iiro Rantala

- 2015: It Takes Two To Tango (ACT)
