= Kjell Bartholdsen =

Norwegian jazz saxophonist

- Born: 2 October 1938; Hammerfest, Finnmark
- Origin: Norway
- Died: 6 November 2009 (aged 71)
- Genres: Jazz
- Occupations: Musician, composer
- Instruments: Tenor saxophone, clarinet

Kjell Bartholdsen (2 October 1938 in Hammerfest – 6 November 2009) was a Norwegian jazz musician (saxophone), that lived in Bodø from 1968.

== Career ==
Bartholdsen was a piano tuner by profession, and he was also a central person on the northern Norwegian jazz scene. His instruments were tenor saxophone, and clarinet (in his early career). He played at Moldejazz in 1974, Nattjazz in 1975, Kongsberg Jazzfestival in 1976, Vossajazz in 1978 as well as several times in the Festival of North Norway and with Concerts Norway. He had to retire in 1988 after a stroke, and had also suffered from bad eyesight during his career. He died in November 2009.

== Honors ==
- 1989: Stubøprisen

== Discography ==
=== Solo albums ===
- 2008: Arctic Bird (Turn Left Prod)

=== Collaborative works ===
- 2001: Jazz From North Norway (Gemini Records), Distant Reports with various artists

Awards
Preceded by -	Recipient of the Stubøprisen; 1989	Succeeded by Henning Gravrok
