= Ragnar Olsen =

Norwegian racewalker (1914–1990)

Personal information
- Born: Ragnar Eugen Olsen; 13 March 1914 Oslo, Norway
- Died: 9 July 1990 (aged 76) Oslo, Norway

Sport
- Country: Norway
- Sport: Athletic
- Event: Racewalking

Ragnar Olsen (13 March 1914 – 9 July 1990) was a Norwegian racewalker who competed in the 1952 Summer Olympics.
