= Jan Gunnar Hoff =

Norwegian jazz pianist, composer, and professor (born 1958)

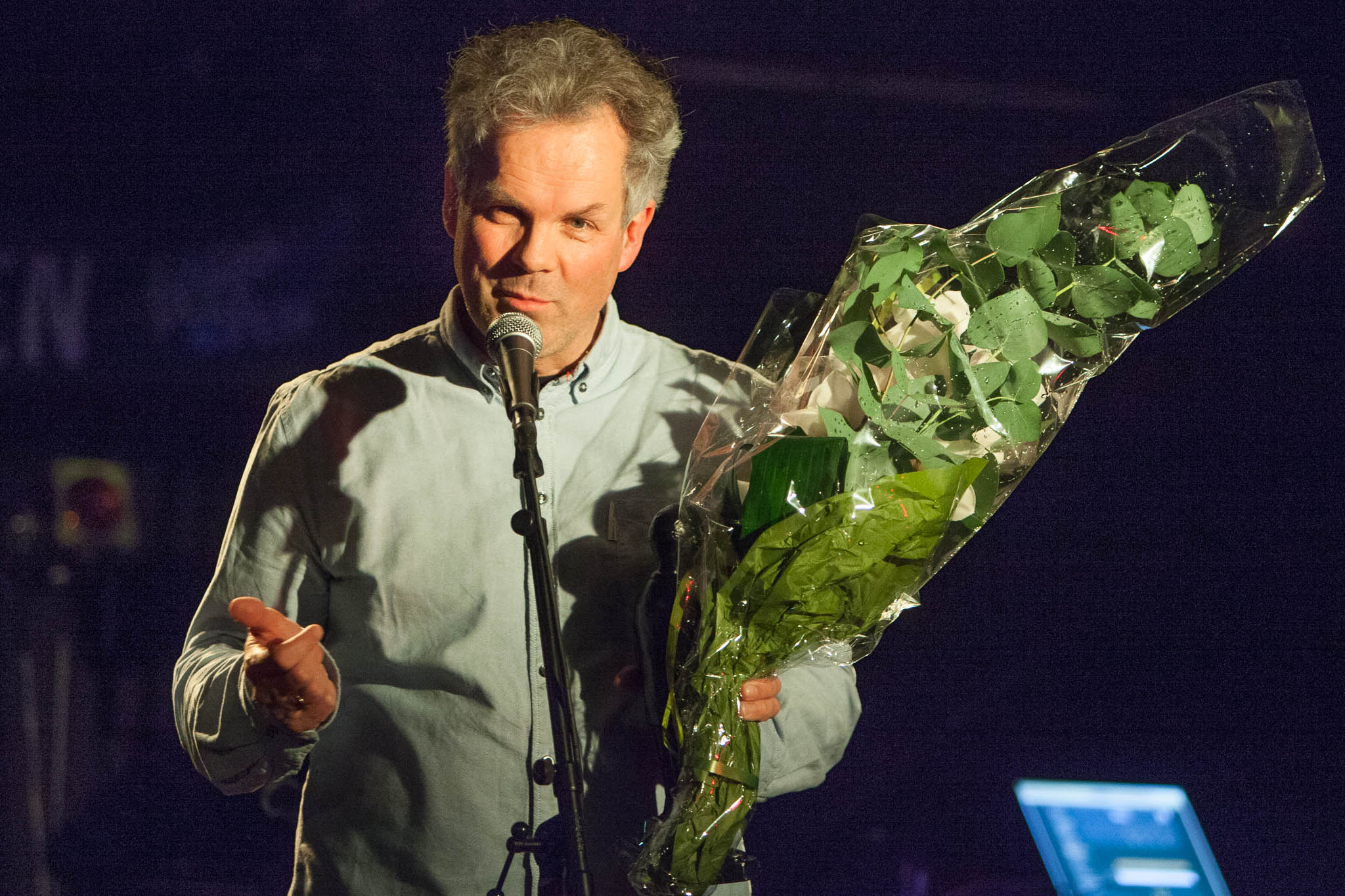
- Hoff was awarded the Buddy-prisen by the Norwegian Jazz Federation during Bodø Jazz Open 2014.

Background information
- Born: 22 October 1958 (age 67); Bodø, Nordland, Norway
- Genre: Jazz
- Occupations: Musician, composer
- Instrument: Piano
- Website: www.jangunnarhoff.no

Jan Gunnar Hoff (born 22 October 1958) is a Norwegian jazz pianist, composer, arranger and professor, living in Bodø, known from cooperations with jazz musicians like Pat Metheny, Mike Stern, Alex Acuña, Audun Kleive, Mathias Eick, John Surman, Karin Krog, Maria João, Marilyn Mazur, Anders Jormin, Arve Henriksen, Per Jørgensen, Tore Brunborg, Bjørn Kjellemyr, Ernst-Wiggo Sandbakk, Per Mathisen, Gary Novak, Arild Andersen, Tore Johansen, Nils Petter Molvær, Ståle Storløkken, Gary Husband a.o.

== Career ==
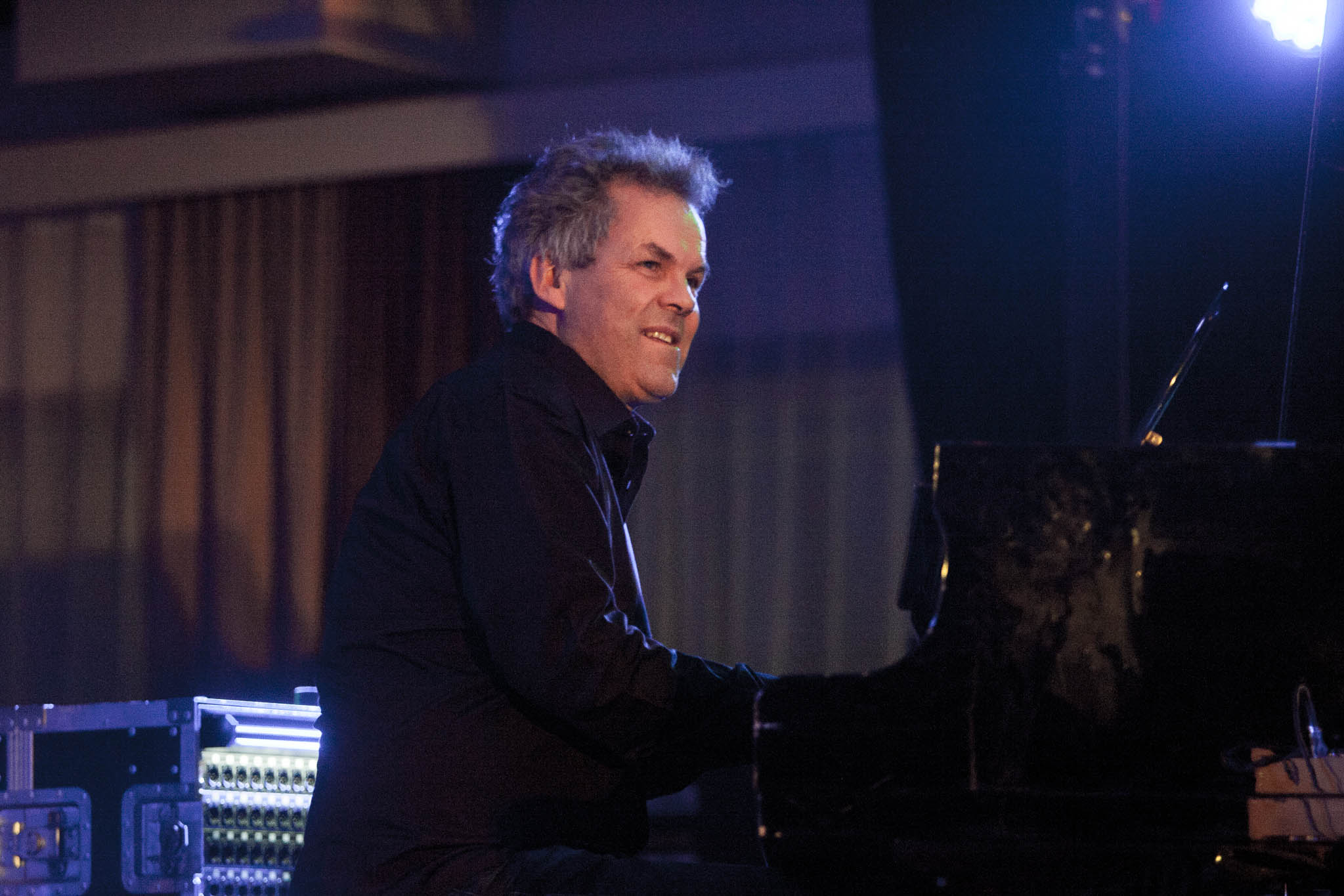
Hoff at Bodø Jazz Open 2013

Hoff was born in Bodø. He is a graduate of the Teachers' College in Bodø and Bergen, and was further educated in the Jazz program at Trondheim Musikkonservatorium under Terje Bjørklund (1986–89), and in composition at Norges Musikkhøgskole (2001). He had his jazz debut with his own trio on Ad Lib Jazzklubb (1976). Hoff's background includes classical piano, progressive rock, pop and jazz. Hoff has released 20 recordings as soloartist and co-leader and he has composed 250 works for different settings. In 2005 he received the prestigious Edvard-prize (named after Edvard Grieg) for his jazz mass Meditatus and the same year he wrote the commission work for Vossajazz. In 2013 Jan Gunnar Hoff and his “Hoff Ensemble” was nominated for US Grammy Awards with their album Quiet winter night. Hoff's quartet album Fly North with Marilyn Mazur, Anders Jormin and Arve Henriksen was nominated for the Norwegian Grammy, Spellemannpris 2014. Jan Gunnar Hoff has performed in Los Angeles, New York, London, Zagreb, Milano, St. Petersburg, Moscow, Kyiv, Stockholm, Istanbul, Havana, Riga and other major cities.

In January 2014 Hoff received the highest distinction in Norwegian Jazz, the Buddy-award. In May 2014 he was credited internationally as an official Steinway Artist. Since 2016 Hoff has released a number of albums: Stories - solo piano 2L 2016, Terra Nova w/mezzo-soprano Marianne Beate Kielland, Lawo classics 2017, Polarity with Audun Kleive, Anders Jormin, Morten Lindberg, 2L April 2018, Barxeta II with Per Mathisen and Horacio Hernandez, Losen Records June 2018, Jan Gunnar Hoff Group feat. Mike Stern on Losen Records November 2018, Gladiator w/Gary Novak, Per Mathisen in 2021 and the solo album HOME in 2022 (2L, Morten Lindberg). Hoff is working as a professor at the University of Tromsø and the University of Agder. He co-founded The Groove Valley JazzCamp in Beiarn Municipality, and was artistic director for TGV Jazz camp from 2005 to 2009. Hoff also initiated Bodø Jazz Open which was launched in January 2011, where he was artistic leader and festival head until 2020.

== Honors ==
- «Stubøprisen» 1997
- «Edvardprisen» Church Music, for Meditatus, 2005
- «Nordlysprisen» 2006
- «US Grammy Awards» 2013 (nomination for album Quiet winter night, as arranger and leader)
- «Buddyprisen» 2014
- «Steinway Artist» 2014
- «Spellemann» 2014 (nomination)
- «Nordland Fylkes kulturpris» 2019
- «Bodø Municipality cultural award» 2021

== Selected works ==
- FASER, a suite in four movements for the concert debut at FINN 1992
- Winds, sea and rhythm, for regional musicians Bodø Municipality 2001
- Blå sitron, for string quartet and jazz trio 2002
- Meditatus, premiered at Nattjazz in Bodø Domkirke, December 17, 2004 with Bodø Domkor (Edvard Prize in 2005)
- Free Flow Songs, commissioned for Vossajazz 2005 (tour in 2006)
- Magma, commissioned work for Jan Gunnar Hoff Group feat. Mike Stern 2006
- Seven seasons, commissioned work for Festspillene in Harstad 2007
- Fantasie nr.1, commissioned work for NMFU 2007
- Songs for trio, commissioned work for Acuña/Hoff/Mathisen CD Jungle City 2008
- Electric blue, commissioned work for NMFU 2009
- For ingens øyne, commissioned work for Hamsunjubileet 2009, with Bjørn Sundquist, Audun Kleive, Bjørn Kjellemyr
- Pictures, commissioned work for Nordland Musikkfestuke 2011, with Knut Erik Sundquist, Unni Wilhelmsen, and others
- Living, commissioned work for Bodø Jazz Open 2012, with Anders Jormin, Arve Henriksen, Marilyn Mazur
- Munch, commissioned work for solo piano 2013
- Hammars suite, composition for jazz trio and string orchestra 2014
- Terra Nova, commissioned work for Bodø Domkor (and jazz group) 2014
- Terra Nova - songs for Marianne Beate Kielland (mezzo-soprano) 2016
- Barxeta II - compositions for jazz/fusion trio
- Polarity - compositions for jazz trio
- Mike Stern & Jan Gunnar Hoff Quartet - compositions for recording 2018
- Vaapstenjeanoe - Big River commission for Festspillene Helgeland, 2020
- Heartlands commission for Bodø Cathedral Choir, 2024

== Discography ==
| Year recorded | Title | Label | Notes |
|---|---|---|---|
| 1993 | Syklus | Odin | w/Kjellemyr, Kleive, Riisnæs |
| 1995 | Moving | Curling Legs | w/Kjellemyr, Kleive, Riisnæs, Jørgensen |
| 1998 | Crosslands | Curling Legs | w/Kjellemyr, Kleive, Brunborg |
| 2003 | In Town | Curling Legs | w/Kjellemyr, Kleive, Brunborg |
| 2007 | Meditatus | Grappa Music | with Bodø Domkor and Jan Gunnar Hoff Group |
| 2008 | Magma | Grappa Music | feat. Mike Stern (US), Maria Joao (PT), Mathias Eick, Eivind Aarset a.o. |
| 2009 | Jungle City | Alessa | with (Alex) Acua/Hoff/Mathisen |
| 2010/2021 | Meditatio Adventus | Fortius, Riga | w/Chamber Choir Foritus, Riga |
| 2011 | Equilibrium | Magma | with Ove Bjørken |
| 2011 | Atmospheres | Magma | with Ove Bjørken |
| 2011 | Acuna/Hoff/Mathisen Live in LA | Drumchannel | with Alex Acuna and Per Mathisen |
| 2012 | Quiet Winter Night | 2L/Universal | Arild Andersen, Mathias Eick a.o. Nominated for US Grammy |
| 2012 | Barxeta | Losen | with Acuña/Hoff/Mathisen |
| 2013 | Living | 2L | Solo piano |
| 2014 | Fly North | Losen | w/Marilyn Mazur, Arve Henriksen, Anders Jormin. Nominated for Spellemann (Norwegian Grammy) |
| 2014 | Stille Lys/Quiet Light | 2L | Solo piano |
| 2016 | Stories | 2L | Solo piano |
| 2017 | Terra Nova | Lawo Classics | duo with mezzo-soprano Marianne Beate Kielland |
| 2018 | Polarity | 2L | w/Anders Jormin, Audun Kleive |
| 2018 | Barxeta II | Losen | w/Per Mathisen, Horacio Hernandez |
| 2018 | Jan Gunnar Hoff Group feat Mike Stern | Losen | w/Mike Stern, Per Mathisen, Audun Kleive |
| 2021 | Gladiator | Losen | Per Mathisen, Jan Gunnar Hoff, Gary Novak (drums) |
| 2022 | Home | 2L | Solo piano |
| 2024 | Northwest | Challenge Records Int | w/Hoff, Somsen, Lindholm |
| 2025 | Voyage | Losen Records | Jan Gunnar Hoff Group feat Gary Husband, Nguyen Le, Per Mathisen |

== Discography as a side man ==
- Flying Norwegians: This Time Around (1979)
- June: E' det sant?/Hvess æ... (1981)
- June: Det e' nu æ lev (1981)
- ASA: Snu pulken (1983)
- Halvdan Sivertsen, Vibeke Sæther, Geir Børresen & Åsmund Huser: Labbetusseviser (1983)
- Arne Benonisen: Looking For Love (1983)
- Terje Nilsen: Pop (1983)
- Halvdan Sivertsen: Amerika (1985, Spellemannpris)
- Dag Kajander: Stormen: Eloise/Petit pictorial (1986)
- Sørpolnissen: Sørpolnissen (1987)
- Nordvest-Russland: Visehjelp til Nordvest-Russland (1989)
- Totenschlager: Bodø-Glimt kassett -89 (1989)
- Torgils Gundersen: Røsslyng/Tilegnet himmelens og jordens skaper – La ditt rike komme (1990)
- Terje Nilsen: Kanskje (1992)
- Mathisens: Mathisens (1993)
- Forenede Fonogramprodusenter: Norske bilder – Sounds and Visions of Norway (1993)
- Rikskonsertene: Levende musikk til alle (1994)
- Pelle Politibil: Glade blålys (1995)
- Terje Nilsen: Sånn (1996)
- Blues Basement: Where the Eagle Flies – Unplugged (1996)
- Gemini Records: Jazz Out of Norway 2 (1996)
- Torgils Gundersen: Tellus. The Blue Album (1997)
- Bodø videregående skole: NRK-opptak november 97 (1997)
- Blues Basement: Ten Years (1998)
- Skoleveiens venner: Skoleveien (2000)
- Tore Johansen: Man, Woman and Child (2000)
- Torgils Gundersen med venner: Kan du hør sirenan... (2001)
- Gemini Records: Distant Reports – Jazz From North Norway (2001)
- Torgils Gundersen: Lysbroen (2001)
- Jan Eggum: President (2002)
- Tore Johansen: Happy Days (2002)
- Dag Kajander: Lykkeland (2002)
- Eva Trones: Lille bille – Eva Trones synger barnesanger av Terje Nilsen (2003, Spellemann)
- Chillinuts: Reworks: What Kind of Machine Is This? (2004)
- Torgils Gundersen: Lånte fjær (2004)
- Music Export Norway: Norway Now – Jazz (2004)
- Jan Eggum: 30/30 (2005)
- Halvdan Sivertsen: 40+ (2005)
- Blues Basement: Blue Tales (2005)
- Terje Nohr: Så langt (2005)
- Alf Kjellman: June 1999 (2007)
- Bodø Domkor: Meditatus (2007)
- Norsk jazzforum: Jazz From Norway 2010 – JazzCD.no 4th Set (2010)
- Tore Johansen: Natt, stille (2010)
- Tore Johansen: Nord (2011)
- Eva Trones: Tango for en (2011)
- Dag Kajander: The Glassblower's Tune (2011)
- Halvdan Sivertsen: Gjør det så gjerne (2012)
- Universal: Stille, stille vinternatt – Musikk fra Blåfjell (2012)
- Dr. Fish: Jeg bor i Lofoten (2013)
- Unni Wilhelmsen: Live with Bodø Rhythm Group featuring Bodø Sinfonietta (2013)
- Norsk jazzforum: Jazz From Norway 2016 – JazzCD.no 7th Set (2016)
- Dag Kajander: Kaldvinds forunderlige reise (2016)
- Dag Kajander: Dag Kajander synger Arvid Hanssen (2017)
- NOSO and Pacho Flores: Deutsche Grammophon (2018)
- Tore Johansen: Natt, Lys (2020)
- Dag Kajander: Salme etter mørketid (single 2022)

== See also ==
- List of jazz arrangers

Awards
| Preceded by Øystein Norvoll | Recipient of the Stubøprisen; 1997 | Succeeded by Trond Sverre Hansen |
| Preceded by Susanne Lundeng | Recipient of the Nordlysprisen; 2006 | Succeeded by Anneli Drecker |
| Preceded by Tore Brunborg | Recipient of the Buddyprisen; 2013 | Succeeded by Erlend Skomsvoll |
