= Arctic Arts Festival =

Norwegian annual music and art festival

Coordinates: 68°47′52″N 16°32′25″E

The Arctic Arts Festival (Norwegian: Festspillene i Nord-Norge) is a festival based in Harstad, Norway.

It was first held in 1965, and consists of music, theatre and art performances. The festival lasts one week and is held in June.

The Arctic Arts Festival is active throughout the year and has arranged annual festivals in Harstad since 1965. From 1995 to 2015 the festival was acknowledged as a festival of national importance, called "knutepunktfestival", and received funding through the government budget. The Arctic Arts Festival is made possible through various sources of funding from the Norwegian state, Finnmark, Troms and Nordland regional councils, as well as the local Harstad council.

In February 2016 the festival launched a new arts and culture magazine called HØTT.

The Arctic Arts Festival administers arts funding which amounts to awards of in total, 1,3 million kroner annually. The aim is to stimulate local arts and culture, and to fund diverse projects in the fields of theatre, music and visual arts.

The Arctic Arts Festival arranges annually NUK (The Northern Norwegian Youth Festival) during the festival week.

== Arctic Arts Summit ==
In June 2017, under the direction of Maria Utsi, the festival launched Arctic Arts Summit; a Pan-Arctic cultural conference for "policymakers and stakeholders from the cultural sector throughout the Arctic region". The Arctic Arts Summit is a biannual event, rotating between Arctic states and territories. After the first edition in Harstad in 2017, the second edition was helt in June 2019 in Rovaniemi, Finland, hosted by University of Lapland. The edition in 2021 was postponed due to the Covid pandemic, and is taking place in Whitehorse, Yukon, Canada in June 2022. The Canadian edition is co-hosted by The Government of Yukon and the Canada Council for the Arts.
