= Henning Gravrok =

Norwegian jazz saxophonist and music teacher

- Born: 19 March 1948 (age 78); Tovik, Troms
- Origin: Norway
- Genre: Jazz
- Occupations: Musician, composer
- Instrument: Saxophone

Henning Gravrok (born 19 March 1948) is a Norwegian jazz musician (saxophone) and music teacher. He was born in Tovik, Northern Norway, raised in Harstad and trained as a teacher. Since 1975 he has been central to the Tromsø and Bodø jazz scenes.

== Career ==
In Tromsø, he played in the bands "Hei og Hå" (1975–79) and "Heracleum" (1976–78), "Inge Kolsvik Quartet" (1979–80), "Fusion Band" (1980–81), "Kjell Svendsen Quintet" (1981–83), "Øystein Norvoll Quintet" and "Synk" (1983–84). In recent years he has taken part in the Northern Norwegian band "Bossa Nordpå", and participated in Marit Sandvik Band.

His debut recording was as a member of Thorgeir Stubø Quintet (1981). In Bodø he led "Bodø Big Band" for a period and the "Ad Lib Jazzklubb", Gravrok has written Minner om i morgen (1991) which was awarded "Stubøprisen" (1991). With his own Henning Gravrok Band he released Hyss (1996) and Ord (1999), with lyrics by Rolf Jacobsen. His latest release was Sense (2006), in cooperation with Eivind Valnes (piano), Rune Nergård (bass), Børge Petersen-Øverleir (guitar) and Andreas Håkestad (drums).

As a composer he has contributed work to "Festspillene i Nord-Norge" (1980, 1989) and the 175th Anniversary to Bodø (1991), and composed music to the novel series "Peder Seier" by Ole Rølvåg, set up on Nordland Teater (2006). He is also Associate Professor at the Conservatory of Music at the University of Tromsø.

== Honors ==
- "Stubøprisen" 1991
- "Nordlysprisen" 1998
- "Bodø bys kulturpris" 2003.

== Discography ==
=== Solo albums ===
- 1996: Hyss (Euridice)
- 1999: Ord med tekster av Rolf Jacobsen (Tylden)
- 2006: Sense (Turn Left Productions)
- 2010: Q ()

=== Collaborative works ===
Within Thorgeir Stubø Band

- 1981: Notice (Odin Records)

With Halvdan Sivertsen

- 1984: Labbetussviser (Igloo Records)
- 1985: Amerika (Plateselskapet A/S)
- 1990: Førr Ei Dame (Plateselskapet A/S)
- 1991: Hilsen Halvdan (Plateselskapet A/S)
- 1996: Ny & Naken (Norske Gram)

Within Torgils

- 1997: Tellus. The Blue Album (White Mountain Records)
- 2001: Lysbroen (White Mountain Records)
- 2004: Lånte Fjær (White Mountain Records)

With other projects

- 1998: Something For Me (Micro Booking), within Ripcoy
- 2002: Even Then (Mother Song) (Taurus Records), within Marit Sandvik Band
- 2005: Med Solidarisk Hilsen (Frank A. Jenssen Records), with Kjell A. Andreassen and Frank A. Jenssen

Awards
Preceded by Kjell Bartholdsen	Recipient of the Stubøprisen; 1991	Succeeded by Marit Sandvik
Preceded by Arne Bjørhei	Recipient of the Nordlysprisen; 1998	Succeeded by Geir Jensen
