= Ethnogala =

Ethnogala is an annual gala evening in Finland for performers of folk music and folk dance. It is organized by the Centre for Folk Music and Folk Dance in Finland.

Ethnogala was first arranged at the end of 2017, and the second gala was arranged in January 2019. The gala was broadcast live by Yle in the internet, and can still be seen worldwide in Yle Areena. An edited version will later be broadcast by Yle on the television.

== 2017 nominees and winners ==
Artist of the Year

- Anne-Mari Kivimäki
  - Other nominees: Frigg, Ismaila Sané

Phenomenon of the Year

- Orivesi All Stars
  - Other nominees: Kalevauva.fi, Pelimanni 8bit

Newcomer of the Year

- Maija Kauhanen
  - Other nominees: BaranBand, Elssa Antikainen

Border Breaking Act of the Year

- Frigg
  - Other nominees: Okra Playground, Pekko Käppi & K:H:H:L

Folk Music Songwriter of the Year

- Pekko Käppi & K:H:H:L
  - Other nominees: Anne-Mari Kivimäki, Tuuletar

Choreographer of the Year

- Petri Kauppinen
  - Other nominees: Hanna Poikela, Rami Meling

Intersection Prize

- Hilda Länsman
  - Other nominees: Digelius Music, World Music School Helsinki

== 2019 nominees and winners ==
Newcomer of the Year

- Pauanne
  - Other nominees: Mammantytöt!, Solju

Intersection Prize

- Kulttuuriyhdistämö Interkult
  - Other nominees: Haapavesi Folk Music Festival, Helsinki-Cotonou Ensemble

Border Breaking Act of the Year

- Sväng
  - Other nominees: Antti Paalanen, Tuuletar

Choreographer of the Year

- Kaari Martin
  - Other nominees: Hanna Poikela, Tanssiteatteri Tsuumi

Producer of the Year

- Kulttuuriosuuskunta Uulu
  - Other nominees: Bafe’s Factory, Rahvaanmusiikin kerho

Folk Music Songwriter of the Year

- Solju
  - Other nominees: Heikki Laitinen, Tuuletar

Artist of the Year

- Sväng
  - Other nominees: Helsinki-Cotonou Ensemble, Johanna Juhola
