= Angu (disambiguation) =

Angu are a group of tribes in Papua New Guinea.

Angu may also refer to:

== Places ==
- Angu River, Brazil
- Angu (crater), Mars
- Angu, a town in Zaire (now Congo), the namesake of the crater
- Angu Township, Qinglong (Angu xiang 安谷乡), township in Qinglong County, Guizhou, China
- Angu Township, Yingsdhan (Angu xiang 安固乡), township in Yingshan County, Sichuan, China
- Angu Hydroelectric Power Station, Sichuan, China

== People ==
- Angu Motzfeldt, Greenlandic singer
- Angu or Charlotte Qamaniq, Canadian Inuk singer from the duo Iva and Angu

== Other ==
- Angu (dish), Brazilian dish
- Angu pastry, Brazilian pastry
- Angu, ghost from Albanian folk beliefs
- Abbey National Group Union (ANGU), former name of Advance (trade union), UK
- Angaiyarkanni, alias Angu, character from Don, a 2022 Tamili film
