= Emil Kárlsen =

Norwegian singer, actor and songwriter (born 1997)

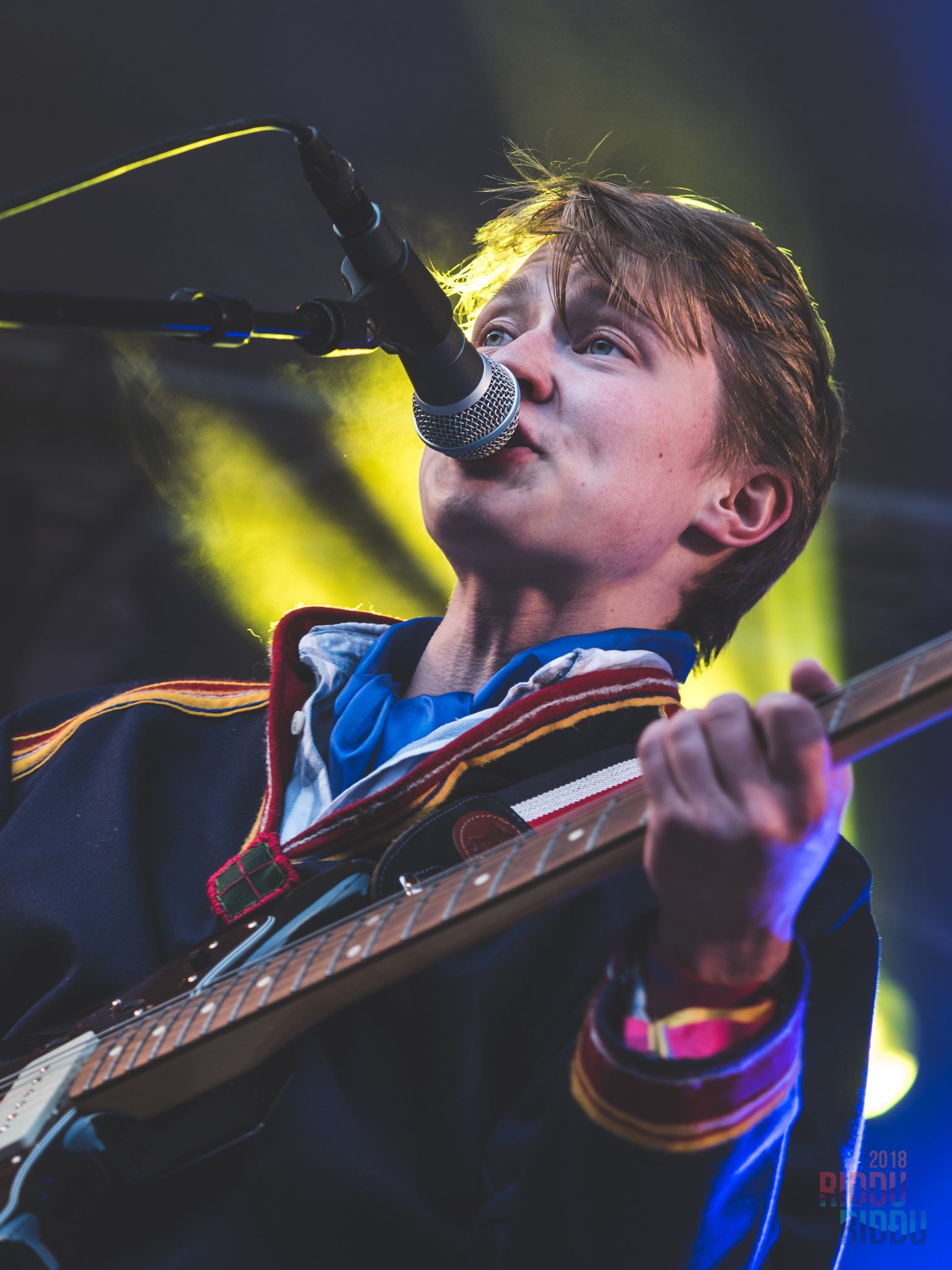

Background information
- Born: Emil Ráste Nikolavu Kárlsen; 1997 (age 28–29)
- Origin: Storfjord, Troms, Norway
- Occupations: Singer; songwriter; musician; actor
- Instruments: Vocals; guitar

Emil Ráste Nikolavu Karlsen (born 1997) is a Norwegian-Sámi singer, actor, songwriter and musician from Storfjord, Troms. Karlsen was vocalist and guitarist in the pop-rock band Resirkulert and has a solo career under the stage name Emil Kárlsen. He was elected as Riddu Riđđu Young Artist in 2019.

Karlsen is Sea Sámi (or Coastal Sámi) and grew up in Oteren in Storfjord municipality. In his youth, he learned to joik and released a joik for his grandfather in 2018 which he also performed at the Nordlysfestivalen. In 2021, he released the album Nágirvárri together with the artist Lávre. Other Sami musicians such as Katarina Barruk, Ulla Pirttijärvi and Hildá Länsman also participated. In 2024, Kárlsen participated in Pan-ArcticVision in Nuuk, Kalaallit Nunaat (Greenland), and through a public vote received the price for ´The Song that gives the most feeling of Community and Togetherness´.

Karlsen also made his acting debut in 2021, when he played Jussi in Beaivváš Sámi Našunálateáhter's production of Koke Bjørn, based on the book by Mikael Niemi. In 2023 he played the lead role in the piece Bjørnejegeren Ol-Tomså, also this one by Beaivváš.

== Discography ==
With Resirkulert:

- Du snakke for dæ sjøl (2017)
- For en dag, for et liv (2019)

Solo:

- Nágirvárrái (with Lávre, 2021)
- Binnát (EP, 2024)
