= Kathleen Ivaluarjuk Merritt =

Inuit throat singer, poet, writer, and musician

Kathleen Ivaluarjuk Merritt is an Inuit throat singer, poet, writer, and musician from Rankin Inlet, Nunavut. Her work is under the artist name Ivaluarjuk (ᐃᕙᓗᐊᕐᔪᒃ), and blends Celtic music and fiddle with throat singing. She is Irish and Inuk.

== Career ==
Her 2015 album, Icelines and Sealskin (Inuktitut: ᓯᑯ, ᑐᓐᓃᑦ ᐊᒻᒪ ᕿᓰᑦ, romanized: siku, tunniit amma qisiit), is an exploration of Irish and Inuk music traditions. It has 11 tracks and runs for 42 min 25 sec. She primarily uses spoken word and throat singing. In her fundraising campaign, she said it would cost almost $30,000 to record an album almost entirely in Nunavut. She has collaborated or performed with multiple artists, including The Jerry Cans, Ptarmigan, Riit, Tanya Tagaq, Susan Aglukark, DJ Spooky, The Crooked Brothers, Owen Pallett, Mike Stevens, and the NAC Orchestra, among others. She has given throat singing workshops since 2008.

She is part of the duo Iva and Angu with Charlotte Qamaniq. They won a 2024 Pan-Arcticvision qualifying event at the Alianait Arts Festival in Iqaluit. In 2022, they released the album Katajjausiit, and received a Juno Award nomination for the Traditional Indigenous Artist of the Year at the Juno Awards of 2023.

== Personal life ==
Her mother is Inuk from Nunavut and father is Irish from Nova Scotia. Accepting both cultures was a major struggle for her. At some points she did not identify as Inuk, and once did not visit her Cape Breton family for eight years.

=== Childhood ===
As a child, Merritt watched Inuuk women perform throat singing at a local talent show and tried throat singing, but did not pick up interest until her 20s. Growing up, she struggled with her identity, not feeling that her Irish or Inuit identities were strong enough to fully identify with either group. One of her earliest memories is of a young girl at a playground telling her she was not Inuk enough.
