= To Cook a Bear =

Swedish television series

- Genre: Drama
- Based on: To Cook a Bear by Mikael Niemi
- Screenplay by: Jesper Harrie
- Directed by: Trygve Allister Diesen
- Starring: Gustaf Skarsgård; Emil Kárlsen; Ane Dahl Torp; Pernilla August; Magnus Krepper; Jonas Karlsson
- Country of origin: Sweden
- No. of series: 1

Production
- Producers: Miira Paasilinna; Martin Persson; Mia Welin
- Production company: Anagram Sweden

Original release
- Network: Hulu; Disney+

To Cook a Bear (Swedish: Koka björn) is a 2025 Swedish Nordic noir television series set in Sweden in 1852, based on the novel of the same name by Mikael Niemi. It is starring Gustaf Skarsgård, Pernilla August, Magnus Krepper and Ane Dahl Torp. It broadcast on Hulu and Disney+ from 15 October 2025.

== Premise ==
A preacher who arrives in a Swedish village around 1852 with the intention of bringing reforms becomes entangled in rumors of man‑eating bear attacks. Under the influence of a murderous individual and the control of powerful local families, his family, along with his adopted Sámi son, falls into deep turmoil.

== Cast ==
- Gustaf Skarsgård as The Pastor
- Emil Kárlsen as Jussi
- Tyra Wingren as Maria
- Ane Dahl Torp as Brita Kajsa
- Pernilla August as Madam Sjödhal
- Magnus Krepper as Brahe
- Jonas Karlsson as Lindmark
- Simon J. Berger as Beronius
- Anton Sehlstedt as Michelsson
- Sigrid Johnson as Lisa
- Selina Ukkonen as Jolina
- Jaakko Ohtonen as Roope
- Sampo Sarkola as Elias
- Sophia Heikkilä as Alinda
- Ánné Mággá Wigelius as Biret
- Dick Idman as Mäkitalo
- Maien Gaup as Anne Maaret
- Andreas af Enehielm as Heikki
- Tobias Zilliacus as Matti Aho
- Gusten Wickberg as Lorens
- Marley Ullberg Hartzberg as Lotta
- Charlotte Lindmark as Gerda
- Mary Sarre as Kaija
- Elin Petersdottir as Kristina
- Hanna Kald as Heikki's Wife
- Leevi Pellas as Olli
- Johan Widerberg as Sederin
- Lily Ek as Lindmarks daughter

== Production ==
The series was announced by Disney+ in November 2022 as the company's first Nordic original series and is an adaptation of the novel of the same name by Swedish author Mikael Niemi (2017). The adaptation is written by Jesper Harrie and is produced by Anagram Sweden. The series is produced by Miira Paasilinna, Martin Persson and Mia Welin, and directed by Trygve Allister Diesen. Filming took place across forty locations in Sweden and Finland.

The cast is led by Gustaf Skarsgård, Ane Dahl Torp, Pernilla August, Magnus Krepper, Jonas Karlsson, Tyra Wingren, Simon J. Berger, Jaakko Ohtonen, Emil Kárlsen and Johan Widerberg.

== Release ==
A Disney+ Nordic Original series, it will be available on Hulu in the United States and on Disney+ in other territories from 15 October 2025.
