= Riddu Riđđu =

Annual Sami music and culture festival held in Norway

Coordinates: 69°31′30″N 20°31′44″E

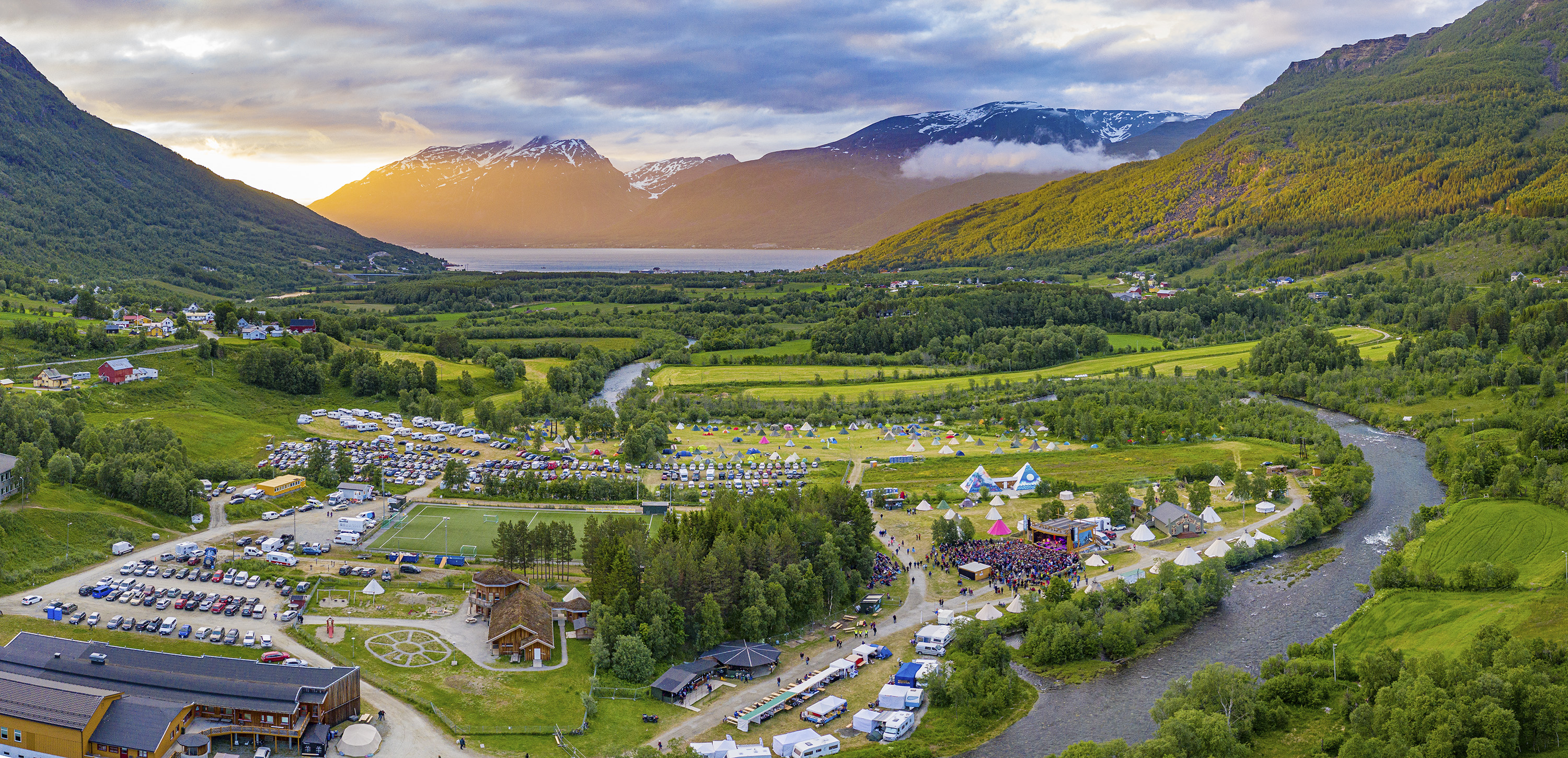
- Riddu Riđđu as seen from above in 2019
- Status: Active
- Genre: Music Festival
- Date: Mid July
- Frequency: Annually
- Location: Kåfjord Municipality
- Country: Norway
- Years active: 1991 – present
- Most recent: 9–13 July 2025
- Next event: 8-12 July 2026
- Website: www.riddu.no

Riddu Riđđu (Northern Sami pronunciation: [ˈridː.tuː ˌrið.ðuː]) is an annual Sámi music and culture festival held in Olmmáivággi (Manndalen) in the Gáivuotna Municipality (also known as Kåfjord Municipality) in Norway. The goal of the festival is to bring forward both Sámi culture and that of other indigenous peoples. Translated to English, the name of the festival is "small storm at the coast". The festival has permanent support from the Ministry of Culture and Church Affairs, the Sámi parliament, Troms county and Kåfjord municipality.

Riddu Riđđu includes concerts, seminars, performances, youth camp, stage art, literature, children's program, Northern People's program, youth camp, film program, courses (workshops), art exhibition, market (bazaar), indigenous houses and much more.

The 30th festival was to be held 8–12 July 2020; however, due to the COVID-19 pandemic the 2020 festival was cancelled. From 2021 onwards, annual festivals have been resumed. The next festival is to be held 8-12 July 2026.

== History ==
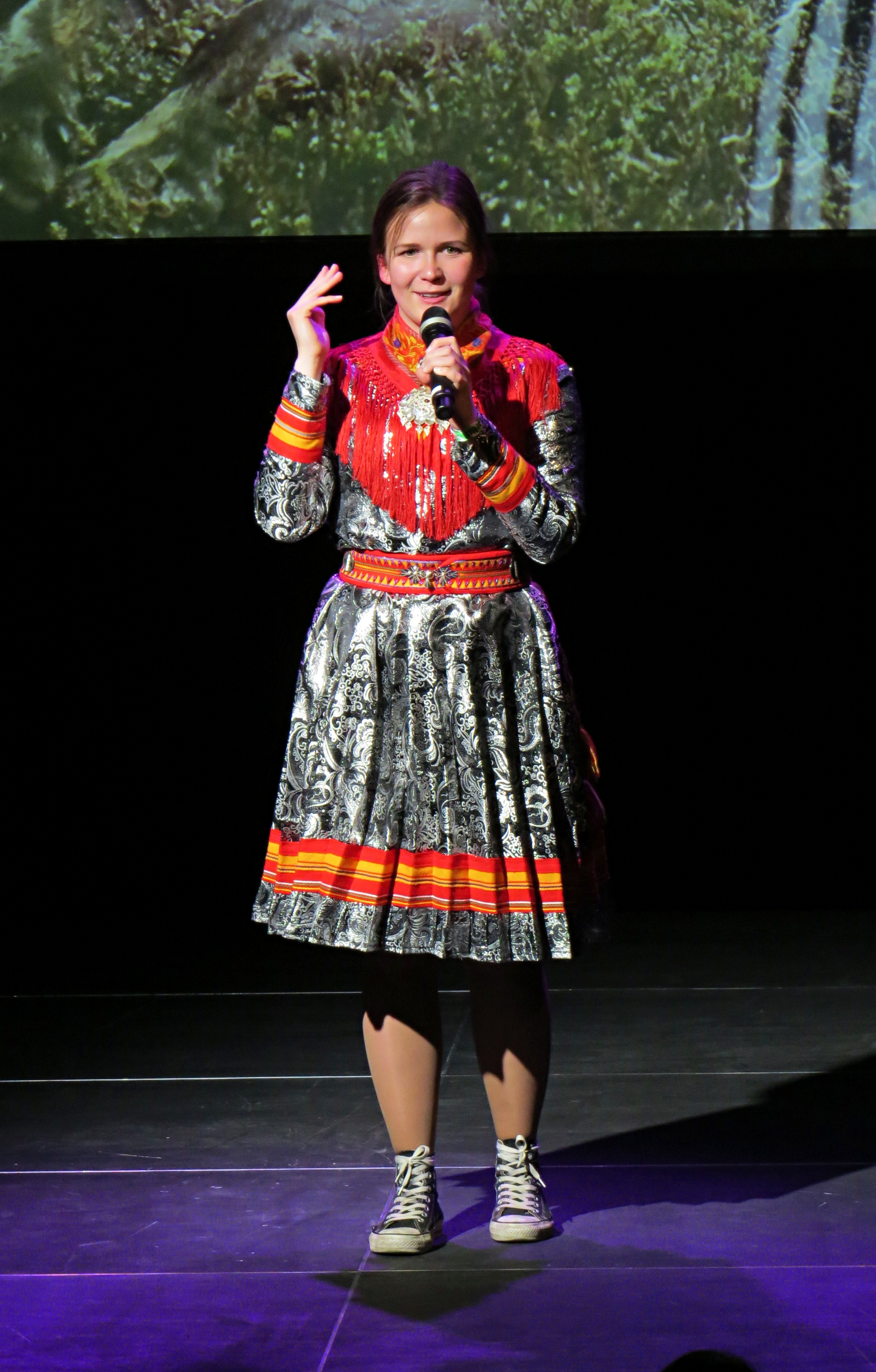
Winner of the 2018 Young Artist of the Year Ánná Káisá Partapuoli

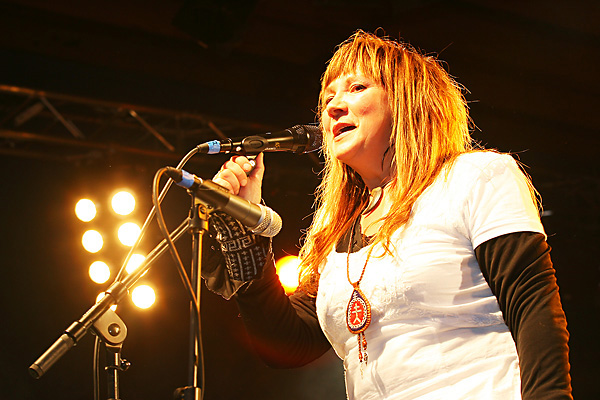
Mari Boine performing at the festival in 2006

The festival was launched by a group of young Sámi on New Year's Eve 1991 at Olmmáivággi (Norwegian: Manndalen). This was a decade after the Sámi cultural revitalization started. Before that time, the Norwegian government attempted to assimilate the indigenous Sámi into the Norwegian majority population. In Olmmáivággi almost all of the previously majority Sámi population now considered themselves as Norwegian.

During the 1990s, the anti-Sámi sentiment was especially strong in the area with Sámi road-signs being shot to pieces and families being split. A group of youth started to ask questions such as: "Why did they [the Norwegian government] take away from us the Sámi language? Why do we hide our Sea-Sámi identity and culture? Why are we ashamed [of being Sámi]?" This started a Sámi youth organization that among other things organized the Riddu Riđđu festival.

The first festival was arranged in 1991 and has since been arranged annually. In 1998, the Riddu Riđđu Searvi organization was established and has since been responsible for arranging the festival. In 2018, Sandra Márjá West became the festival manager.

The festival was opened by Queen Sonja in 2016. In 2017, the then Minister of Culture Trine Skei Grande was responsible for the opening.

== Lineups ==
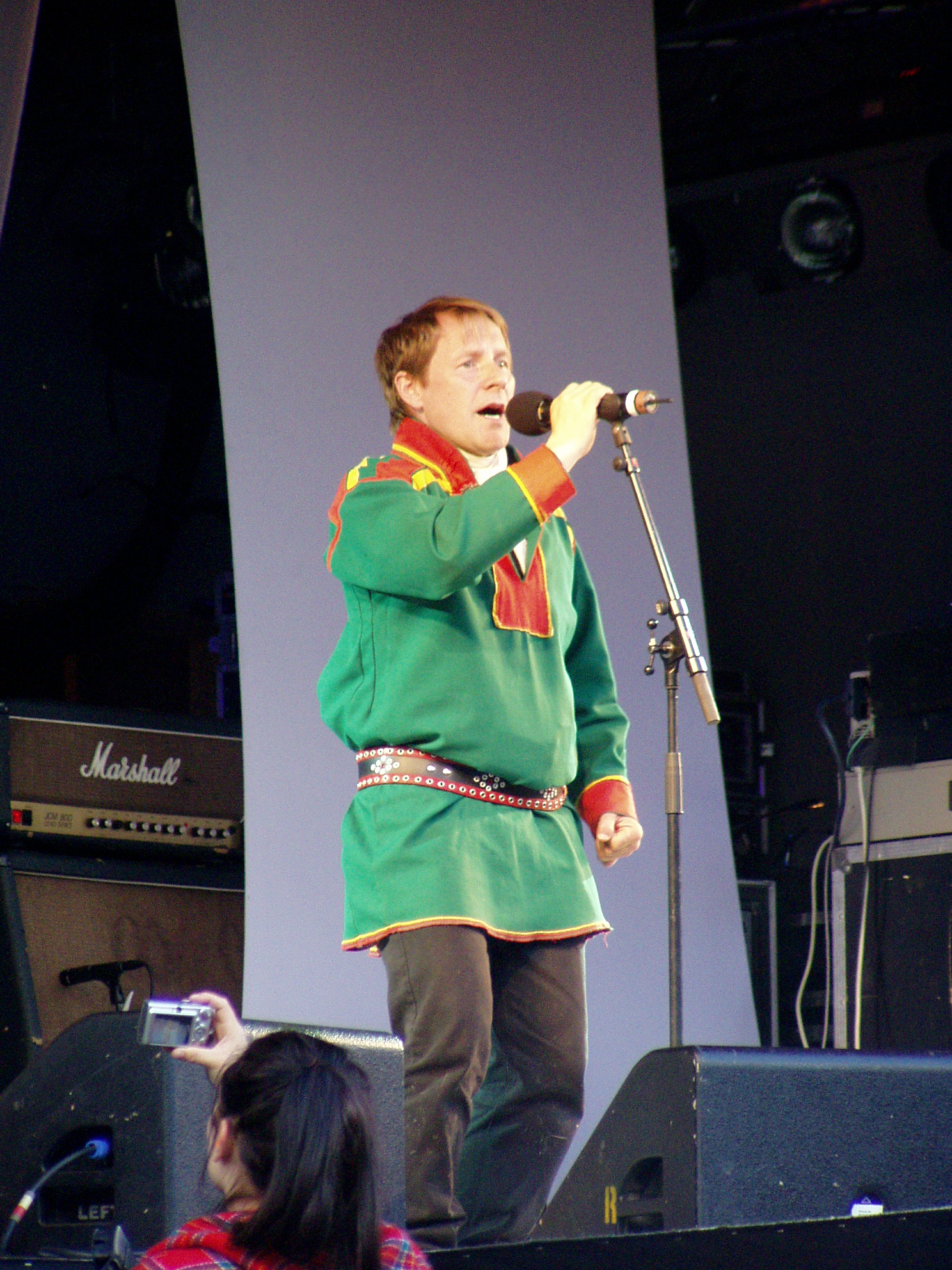
Ánde Somby from Vajas joiking at the festival in 2007

=== 2013 lineup ===
- Buffy Sainte-Marie
- Moana and the Tribe
- Oki Dub Ainu Band
- Elin Kåven
- Lovisa Negga
- Violet Road
- Admiral P
- Iva Lamkum
- Sisi

=== 2014 lineup ===
- A Tribe Called Red
- Felgen Orkester
- Jon Henrik Fjällgren
- Biru Baby
- Tamikrest
- Hekla Stålstrenga
- Sator
- Jörgen Stenberg

=== 2015 lineup ===
- Mari Boine
- Resirkulert
- Yann Tiersen
- Nanook
- Senjahopen
- Katchafire
- Amoc
- Urna
- F.A.C.E.

=== 2016 lineup ===
- Slincraze
- Sofia Jannok
- Ana Tijoux
- Violet Road
- Sondre Justad
- Hanggai
- Marja Helena Fjellheim Mortensson
- Ylva
- Suming
- Herman Rundberg
- Kitok
- Traditional

=== 2017 lineup ===
- Chalama Project
- Uyarakq
- Áilu Valle
- Dagny
- Duolva Duottar
- Ondt Blod
- Ágy
- Isák
- Johan Anders Bær
- Radik Tyulush
- Silver Jackson
- Dj Ailo

=== 2018 lineup ===
- Mari Boine
- Baker Boy (with Yirrmal and Kian)
- Resirkulert
- Solju
- Wimme Saari
- Amanda Delara
- Felgen Orkester
- Biru Baby
- Tyva Kyzy
- DJ Shub
- 99Plajo

=== 2019 lineup ===
- Buffy Sainte-Marie
- Wiyaala
- Maxida Märak
- ISÁK
- Tanya Tagaq
- Hildá Länsman
- Alash
- Opphav feat. Risten Anine
- Silla + Rise
- Ruben
- Jeremy Dutcher
- DJ: 169
- Mio Negga
- Alexia Galloway-Alainga
- Cheinesh
- DJ Rise Ashen
- Slincraze

=== 2021 lineup ===
- ISÁK
- Agnete
- Kalle Urheim
- DJ iDJa with Åvla and Ramona Linnea
- Felgen Orkester
- A Million Pineapples
- Bats of Congress
- DJ collective Article 3
- OZAS
- Kajsa Balto

=== 2025 lineup ===
- Aysanabee
- Kajsa Balto
- Intrigue
- Sara Curruchich
- Nini
- Northern Cree
- RSP & Thomax
- Sauwestari
- Marja Mortensson
- Simon Issát Marainen
- Ailu Valle X Amoc X
- Boogiemen
- The Arctic Is Not For Sale (Nunatta Isiginnaartitsisarfia + Nordting - Northern Assembly)
