= PIQSIQ =

Inuit throat singing duo

- Origin: Yellowknife, Canada
- Genres: Inuit throat singing
- Members: Tiffany Ayalik; Inuksuk Mackay

PIQSIQ is an Inuit throat singing (katajjaq) duo composed of sisters Tiffany Ayalik and Inuksuk Mackay. They blend traditional Inuit throat singing practices with beats, looping, and other sorts of electronic manipulation to create complex, multi-layered songs.

== Early history ==
The sisters have roots in the Kitikmeot and Kivalliq regions of Nunavut, but grew up in Yellowknife, Northwest Territories. They describe their childhood as very close, involving constant playing and fighting.

Ayalik and Mackay began learning Inuit throat singing—which is traditionally performed by duets of women performing face-to-face—before the age of six. Although their early experiences with throat singing were in a very traditional format, they began to incorporate more modern experimental techniques as part of trying to find a musical language that felt authentic to themselves as Inuit in the 21st century. They describe throat singing as a practice that helped them bond as sisters and trust each other.

== Career ==
Like traditional Inuit throat singing, PIQSIQ's performances have a strongly improvisational aspect to them. Along with electronic beats and manipulation, the sisters also incorporate other experimental techniques into their music; for example, they worked with Coloma Guitars in Vancouver to invent a string instrument called the "death harp" made in large part from caribou antlers, whale bones, and baleen.

PIQSIQ's music has been deeply shaped by the history of colonial suppression of throat singing and other Inuit cultural practices under Christian missionaries and the Canadian government's Indian Act. In many circumstances, it carried a risk of fines or imprisonment, causing the practice to go nearly extinct. In 2019, they released a Christmas album entitled Quviasugvik: In Search of Harmony that featured re-imaginings of traditional Christmas carols, which they described as a "political act." The album was shaped by the complicated and bittersweet feelings the sisters with the Christmas season, both due to the role of Christian institutions in colonialism and the lack of sunlight. The following Christmas season, they released a cover of the "Coventry Carol" just weeks after releasing the song cycle Taaqtuq Ubluriaq: Dark Star.

In 2021, they released the album Live from Christ Church Cathedral, recorded in Christ Church Cathedral in Vancouver. They submitted the album to the best gospel album category at the Juno Awards, with the aim of prompting a discussion on the role of Christian organizations in causing harm to Indigenous peoples.

PIQSIQ's 2018 EP Altering the Timeline was nominated for Best Electronic Album at the 2019 Indigenous Music Awards. However, they withdrew the album from consideration (alongside other artists like Tanya Tagaq and Kelly Fraser) due to concerns over cultural appropriation of Inuit throat singing by non-Inuk artists. While PIQSIQ declined to name the artist in question, it was widely taken to be the Cree singer Cikwes, whose album Isko incorporated throat singing and was nominated for Best Folk Album.

In 2019, Nunavut MP Mumilaaq Qaqqaq and NDP leader Jagmeet Singh posted a TikTok video of themselves dancing to PIQSIQ's song "Tuktu Strut" from Altering the Timeline to display their NDP-branded parkas.

== Collaborations ==
PIQSIQ recorded the soundtrack for the 2024 Canadian animated film Sunburnt Unicorn, a collaboration that came about after director Nick Johnson was inspired by a performance of theirs at the Calgary Folk Music Festival.

Along with Greyson Gritt, the sisters also form part of the Juno Award-winning band Quantum Tangle. They have also collaborated with the Finnish duo Vildá, whose singer Hildá Länsman is Sámi, on the single "Ovddos / Hivumuuniq".
