= Flying Down Thunder and Rise Ashen =

- Origin: Winneway, Quebec
- Genres: Electronic house, First Nations music
- Members: Kevin "Flying Down Thunder" Chief; DJ Eric "Rise Ashen" Vani

Flying Down Thunder and Rise Ashen are a Canadian electronic music duo based in Ottawa, Ontario, who blend electronic house music with traditional First Nations music. Their album One Nation was a shortlisted Juno Award nominee for Aboriginal Album of the Year at the Juno Awards of 2012.

The band's members are vocalist Kevin "Flying Down Thunder" Chief and DJ Eric "Rise Ashen" Vani.

== History ==
Chief, an Algonquin member of the Long Point First Nation people from Winneway, Quebec, works as an aboriginal self-government negotiator for the Canadian government department of Aboriginal Affairs and Northern Development, while Vani works as a real estate agent. The two met when Vani heard Chief performing during Ottawa's Winterlude.

Chief and Vani collaborated to create an album which combined urban electronic music with traditional indigenous rhythms and chants, and stories. The album, One Nation, was released in 2011 on the Balanced label. The album appeared on the !earshot Campus and Community National Top 50 Albums chart in January, 2012 and that year was nominated for a Juno Award for Aboriginal Album of the Year.

== Other collaborations ==
Chief has also collaborated on music with Eagle & Hawk, and recorded an album in 2013 with his daughter Amber Asp-Chief under the band name Mazinikijik Singers. He won a Native American Music Award for Best Producer in 2014 for that album.

Vani has also collaborated with Ammoye on the 2010 album Haffi Win, and with Inuit musicians Cynthia Pitsiulak and Charlotte Qamaniq in the project Silla + Rise, whose album Debut was a Juno Award nominee for Indigenous Music Album of the Year at the Juno Awards of 2017.

== Discography ==
- One Nation (2011)
