= Saina (singer) =

Russian singer (born 1971)

- Born: Ekaterina Arkadyevna Savvinova; 17 July 1971 (age 55); Kyusyur, Yakut ASSR, Soviet Union
- Genre: Ethnic
- Occupations: Singer; songwriter; musician
- Years active: 1996–present

Ekaterina Arkadyevna Savvinova (Russian: Екатерина Аркадьевна Саввинова; born 17 July 1971), known professionally as Saina (Russian: Саина, Yakut: Саина), is a Yakut singer, songwriter and musician. Her song "Hello, Yakutsk!" became the unofficial anthem of Yakutsk.

== Early life and education ==
Saina was born as Ekaterina Arkadyevna Savvinova on 17 July 1971 in the village of Kyusyur into a family of musicians. Her mother worked as a choir conductor, while her father was a saxophonist and clarinetist.

== Career ==
She began performing under the stage name Saina and began performing Yakut pop music. During this time, Saina continued her studies and began to travel abroad, where she became interested in authentic ethnic repertoire. Saina toured Mongolia, Bulgaria, Turkey, and Canada and started an internship as an accompanist at the Yakutsk Philharmonic.

Saina sings native songs, focusing on the repertoire of Evenks, Yakuts, Chukchi, Dolgans, and Yukagirs. She also sings in Russian, and her first hit, "Hello, Yakutsk!," was released in that language. Saina has performed in approximately 200 songs in 30 different languages across various genres, from folk to pop-rock.

In October 2015, Saina participated in the cultural program of the World Games of Indigenous Peoples of the World, held in Palmas, Tocantins, Brazil.

In 2025, Saina won "Most Arctic Song", presented by Pan-ArcticVision.

== Personal life ==
Saina was married to Radislav Zakharov, who was also a musician. After divorcing him, she then dated another man but they also broke up. She has a daughter, Nurguyana, and one grandson.

== Discography ==
| Album | Year |
|---|---|
| Hello, Yakutsk! | 1998 |
| Northern Lights | 2002 |
| Saina | 2005 |
| Love is like a dream | 2008 |
