= Ánná Káisá Partapuoli =

Saami slam poet (born 1995)

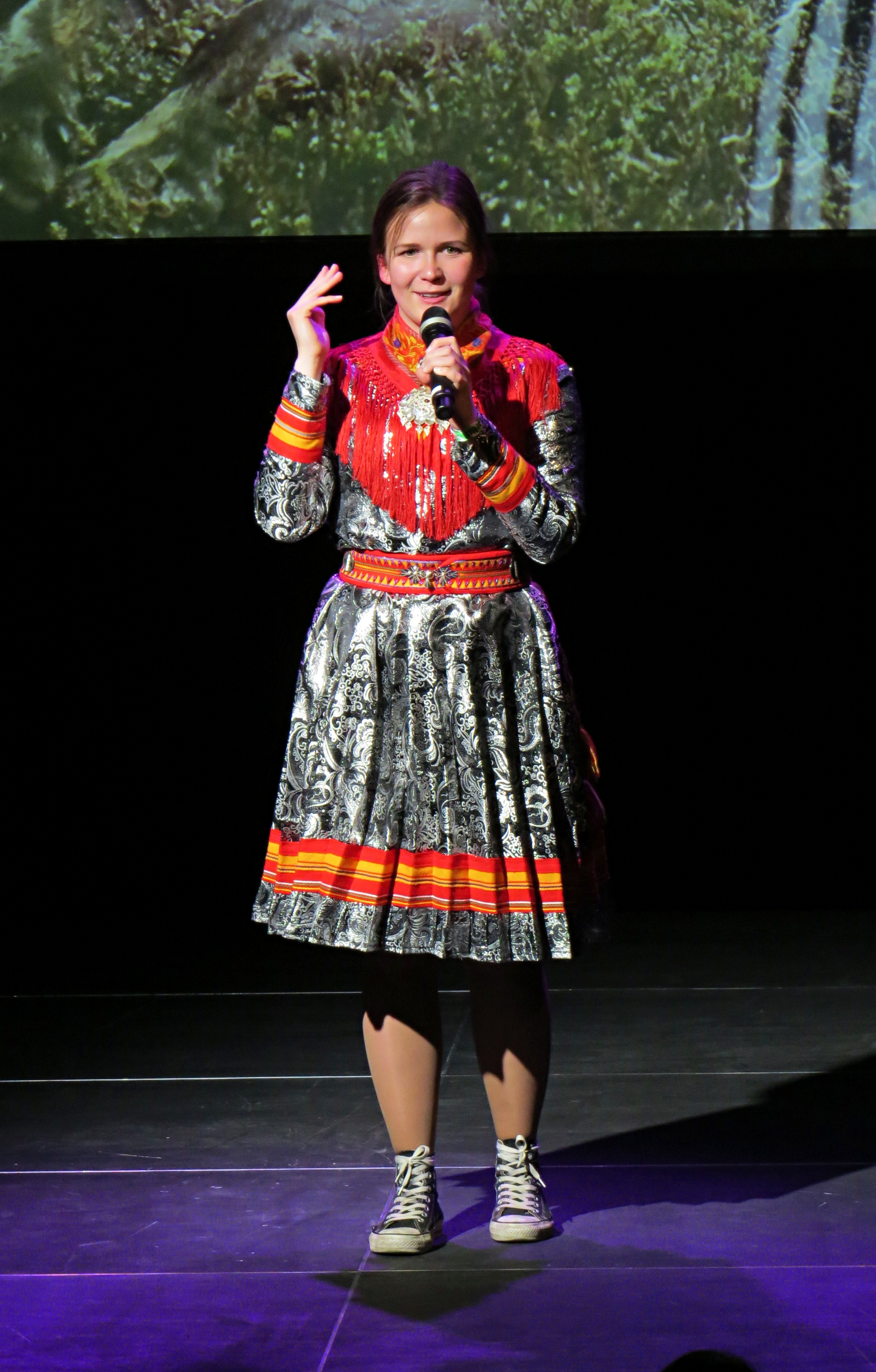
- Born: 1995 (age 30–31); Skånland, Norway
- Occupations: slam poet, translator, author

Ánná Káisá Partapuoli (born 1995) is a Norwegian Sámi slam poet. In 2018 she was named Young Artist of the Year by a Sami festival Riddu Riddu. She also received Coop Nord's cultural award in 2018.

== Biography and works ==
Partapuoli is from Skånland Municipality, Norway. Partapuoli grew up partly in northern Sweden where her father was herding reindeer. Partapuoli finds inspiration for her poetry in the Sami culture. Many of her texts are also political and her aim is to lift the Sámi languages, and especially her own dialect Tornesami's value and usage. It is often in the mountains where Partapuoli finds inspiration and time to make notes and recordings on her phone. Partapuoli's style of performing concentrates on rhymes and rhythms.

Partapuoli has written poems all her life. One of her most important artistic role models is a Sami poet Nils-Aslak Valkeapää (known as Áillohaš in the Northern Sami language) who had a strong influence in the shaping of Sami poetry. Partapuoli started doing slam poetry in 2016. The transition felt natural to her since she has always enjoyed working with rhymes, rhythms and performance. As a slam poet she wants to prove that the Sami language is altogether possible to rime with, and that poetry can be enjoyable and inspiring for young people. In addition, it is important for her to strengthen and preserve her own language, so she only writes in Sami.

Partapuoli is currently living in Tromsø Municipality where she is studying pedagogics.
