= Amund Sjølie Sveen =

Norwegian artist and composer

- Occupations: Artist, composer and writer
- Website: amundsveen.no

Amund Sjølie Sveen is a Norwegian artist, composer and writer.

== Career ==
His art tackles issues surrounding the Arctic. Sveen launched Nordting, an artistic platform for intervention and reflection in the north. Nordting is a mobile people's assembly for the North, bringing together residents from Vardø in Northern Norway to Alaska, to participate in the council, called the Ting. Local participants, from bands and choirs to community leaders, punk rockers, cheerleaders, indigenous peoples, musicians, and dancers, join Sveen and his team to discuss and address issues affecting their communities. Sveen describes Nordting, which has been active since 2014, as a testing ground for political ideas and critique of the current power situation.

Sveen has initiated and led the Pan-ArcticVision, an Arctic social and cultural event. The first edition was held in his home town of Vadsø in Northern Norway, the second edition was held in Nuuk, Kalaallit Nunaat in October 2024. As a musician, he is a member of the Slagr, a Norwegian trio formed in 2003 who received Spellemannprisen (a Norwegian Grammy) for their release Short Stories in 2015. Sveen also is associated with the UiT The Arctic University of Norway, as an artistic researcher.

== Selected projects ==
- 2005: Deconstructing IKEA, solo percussion
- 2007: United States of Barents, solo performance, Kirkenes, NO
- 2009: Deconstructing IKEA, installation; Moscow (RU), Rovaniemi (FI), Tromsø, Oslo, NO
- 2009: Rising Water, outdoor installation, commission by Tromsø kunstforening; Tromsø, NO
- 2013: Barents Liberation Army, project with writer Morten Strøksnes, Kirkenes, NO
- 2013: Economic Theory for Dummies, solo performance, Steirischer Herbst, Graz
- 2013: The (Oil) Fountain of Youth, exhibition of an unmade installation; Kirkenes, NO
- 2014: Nordting, multimodal performance and discursive project, presented throughout the circumpolar north
- 2015: Economic Theory for Dummies, solo performance, Black Box Teater, Oslo, NO
- 2018: COMMONISM, new performance with theater maker Andy Smith, UK
- 2020: MNGA, temporary light installation in public space, Longyear, Svalbard, NO
- 2023: Pan-ArcticVision, circumpolar performative spectacle, Vadsø, NO (2023), Nuuk, GL (2024)
- 2026: Grensa / The Border, a series of performative live-streams along the Norwegian-Russian border.
- 2026: Statue updates, a series of installing information signs on statues of the missionary Hans Egede.
