= Iva and Angu =

Canadian musical duo

Iva and Angu are a Canadian musical duo from Nunavut who perform Inuit throat singing. The duo, consisting of Kathleen Ivaluarjuk Merritt and Charlotte Qamaniq, released the album Katajjausiit in 2022, and received a Juno Award nomination for Traditional Indigenous Artist of the Year at the Juno Awards of 2023. In 2024, they participated in Pan-ArcticVision in Nuuk, Kalaallit Nunaat (Greenland), and through a public vote received the prize for the Most Arctic Song.

Merritt has previously performed as a collaborator with The Jerry Cans, Ptarmigan and Riit, while Qamaniq has performed with Keiino and Silla + Rise.
