= Pan-ArcticVision =

International music event

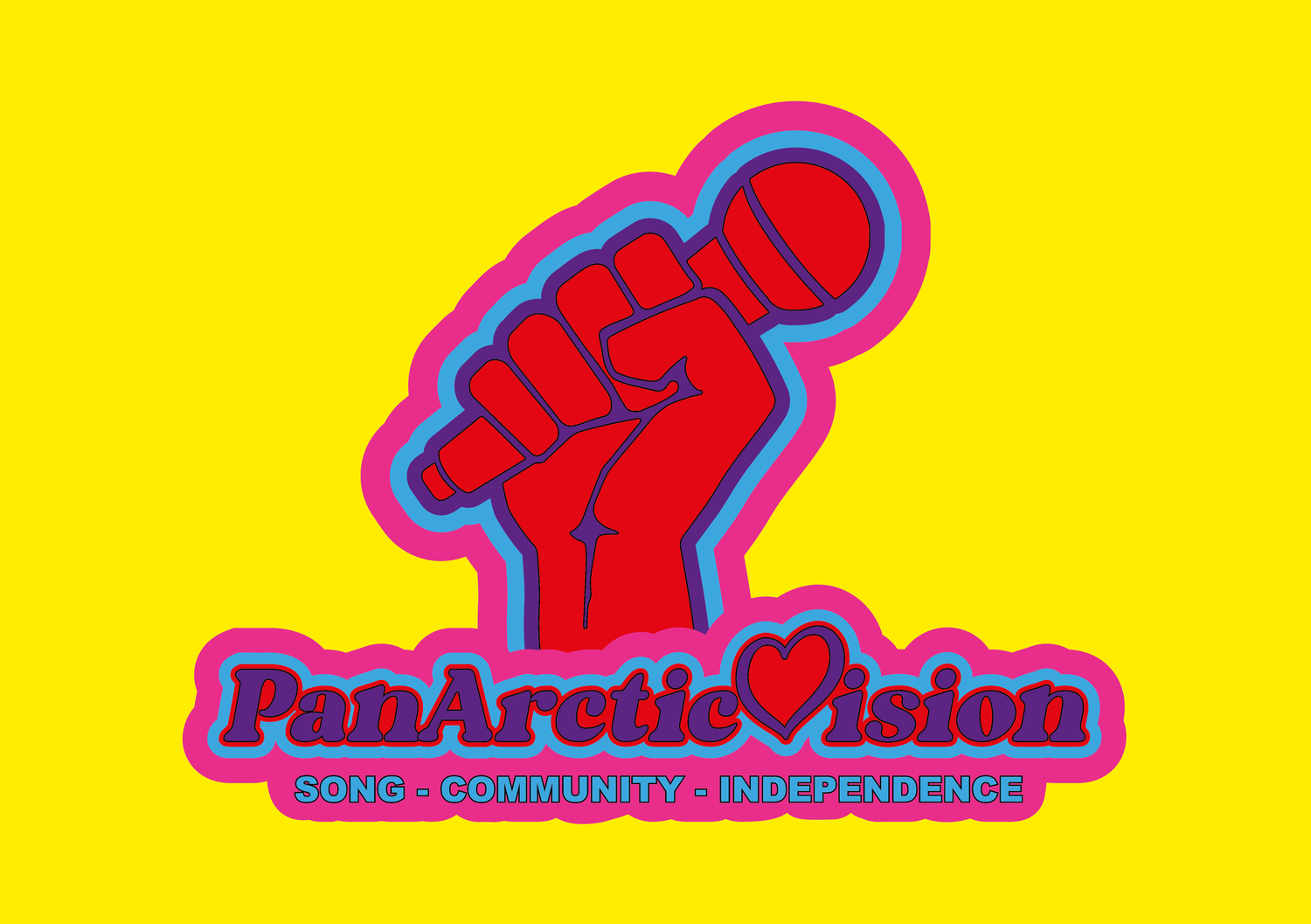
PAV logo 2023

Pan-ArcticVision is an international social and cultural event that describes itself as "a Eurovision for the Arctic". Pan-ArcticVision has live musical contributions from the circumpolar North (the Arctic), and arranges televotes among the public. The event is broadcast internationally, and is loosely modeled on the Eurovision Song Contest.

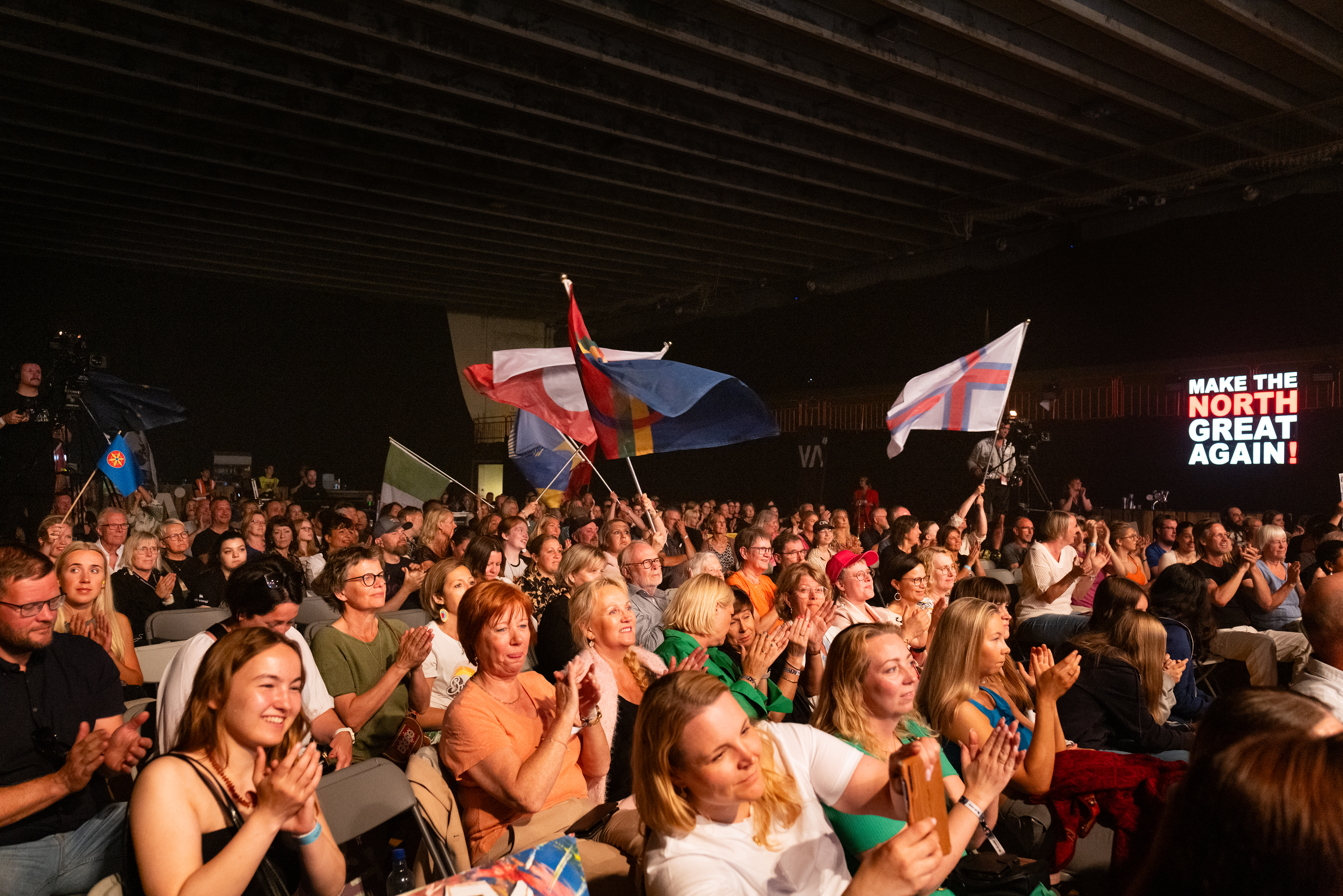
The audience of Pan-ArcticVision 2023 waving Arctic flags

Different from Eurovision, the Pan-ArcticVision questions the concept of a musical competition, and asks the public to decide whether or not there should be a more than one winner. Furthermore, this is not a competition between creators (unlike Eurovision); it is a competition between communities and artists who both create and perform their own works. The Pan-ArcticVision has participants not from nation states, but from different northern and Arctic territories, displaying local Arctic flags. The two first editions have included participants from Alaska, The Yukon, Nunavut, Kalaallit Nunaat, Iceland, Faroe Islands, Sápmi, Nord-Norge (Northern Norway), Norrbotten in Norra Sverige (Northern Sweden) and Pohjois-Suomi (Northern Finland) — in addition to a Russian Arctic Exile participant. Through this, the event aims to strengthen circumpolar, Pan-Arctic contact, and invites the public to consider questions of sovereignty, borders and nation states.

In April 2024, it was announced that the second edition of Pan-ArcticVision would go live from Nuuk, Kalaallit Nunaat, in October 2024, in cooperation with the culture centre Katuaq and Greenlandic Broadcasting Corporation, KNR. There was an open call in several territories to find participants for the event. The Pan-ArcticVision 2025 was held in Iqaluit, in Nunavut in Canada in the fall of 2025.

== Pan-ArcticVision 2023 ==
The first edition of the Pan-ArcticVision was arranged in Vadsø, Northern Norway, a town of ca 6000 people located on the brink of the European mainland. The event was hosted by the local festival Varangerfestivalen. The public voted to that the competition should have multiple winners, not just one. In addition, there was a prize for "the place in the Arctic that really needs a prize and deserves to host the next edition of the Pan-ArcticVision". This prize was won by Kalaallit Nunaat (Greenland). This implied that the next event would be arranged in Nuuk.

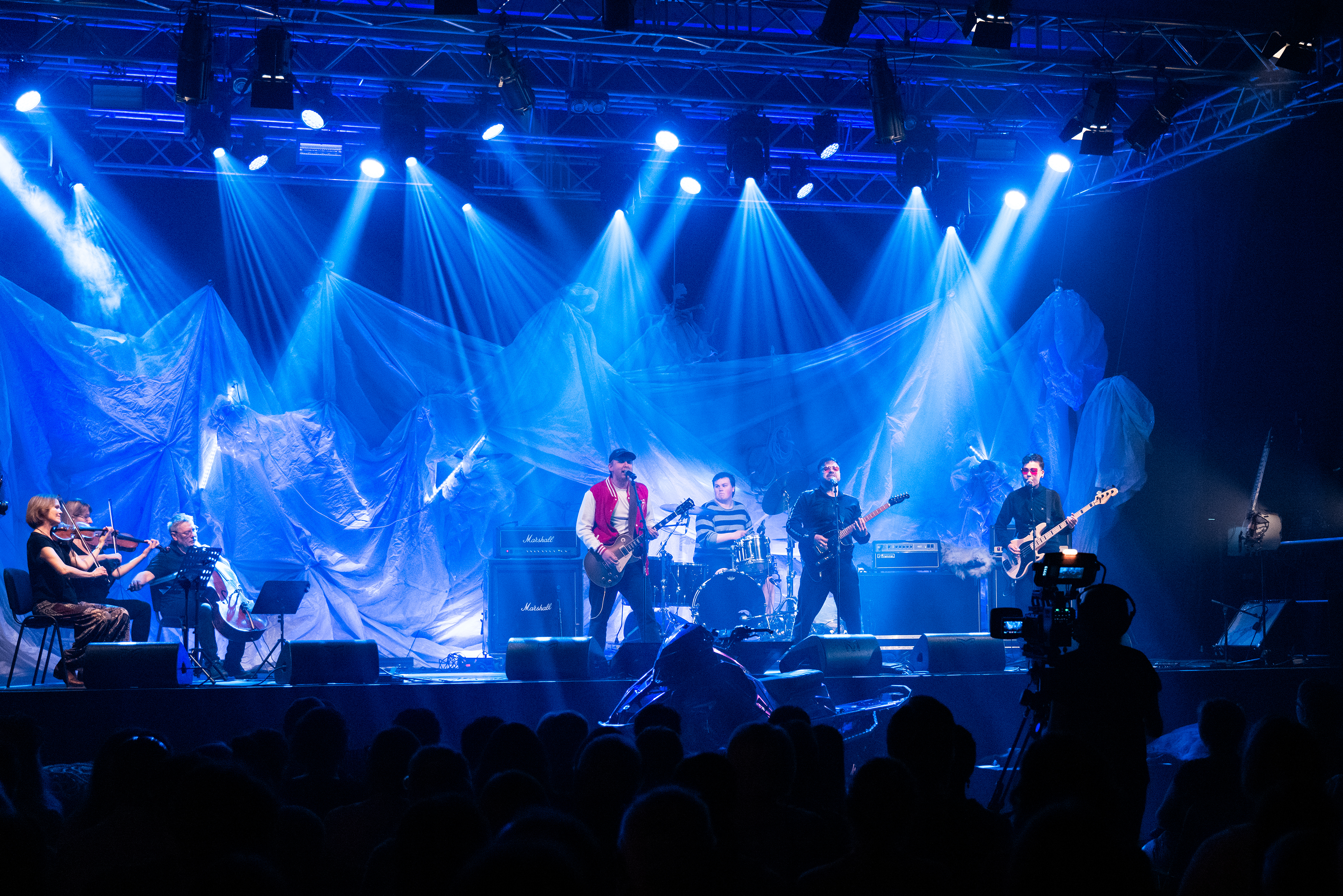
Nuija from Nuuk, Kalaallit Nunaat (Greenland) 🇬🇱 - one of several winners of Pan-ArcticVision 2023

Prize winners 2023:

- The most Arctic Song 2023: Nuija from Nuuk, Kalaallit Nunaat (Greenland).
- The most Revolutionary Song 2023: Sköll from Båtsfjord, Nord-Norge (Northern Norway).
- The song that gives the most feeling of Community and Togetherness 2023: Guðrið Hansdóttir from Velbastaður, Føroyar (The Faroe Islands).

Other notable participants of Pan-ArcticVision 2023 included Byron Nicholai from Alaska.

== Pan-ArcticVision 2024 ==
The second edition of Pan-ArcticVision 2024 was broadcast live from Katuaq culture centre in Nuuk, Kalaallit Nunaat (Greenland) Oct 12, by Kalaallit Nunaata Radioa, the Greenlandic Broadcasting Corporation. The public vote to select a host community for the next edition was won by Nunavut, the self-governing territory of the Canadian Inuit.

Other notable participants of Pan-ArcticVision 2024 included Qacung Stephen Blanchett from Alaska, know from the band Pamyua, and Mirja Palo from Northern Sweden.

Winners

Pan-Arcticvision 2024 Results
R/O	Region	Artist	Song	Winner
1	Kalaallit Nunaat	Naja P	Allaaneruvutit	
2	Nord-Norge	Emil Kárlsen	Čávkkus - Saukkonen - Oteren	The song that gives the most feeling of community and togetherness
3	Iceland	Vampíra	Blóð Móðurkviðs	
4	Norra Sverige	Mirja Palo	Lullálávlu	
5	Alaska	Qacung Blanchett	Ulaa	
6	Føroyar	Ester Skála	Dansur á Rósum	
7	Russian Arctic Exile	Evgeny Goman	Правило двух стен (Pravilo dvukh sten)	Most revolutionary song
8	Nunavut	Iva & Angu	Katjajjausiit	Most Arctic song
9	Pohjois-Suomi	Talonpoika Lalli	Make Lapland Great Again	

== Pan-ArcticVision 2025 ==
The third edition of Pan-ArcticVision 2025 was held at the Iqaluit Cadet Hall in Iqaluit, Nunavut, Canada, and presented by Laakkuluk Williamson Bathory. It was organised by Nordting - Northern Assembly and host broadcaster Uvagut TV, who staged the event after Nunavut was chosen to host the event by public vote in the 2024 edition. The event was originally scheduled to take place on 18 October 2025, but was pushed back to 29 November 2025 due to "circumstances beyond the organizer's reach".

Nine solo artists, duos and bands from different parts of the Arctic and northern region participated in the competition. The winners were Saina from Sakha in the category "Most Arctic Song", Linus Johnsen in the category "song that gives the most feeling of community and togetherness" and Geðbrigði from Iceland in the category "Most Revolutionary Song". The public vote to select a host community for the next edition was won by Føroyar (Faroe Islands), an autonomous territory of the Kingdom of Denmark.

=== Participants ===
Region	Artist	Song	Language	Notes
Alaska	Quinn Christopherson	"Fireweed"	English	
Føroyar	Dóttir	"Vitan"	Faroese	
Kalaallit Nunaat	Kimmernaq Kjeldsen and HH	"Ikusimiaq"	Greenlandic	
Iceland	Geðbrigði	"Móðir Vor"	Icelandic	
Pohjois-Suomi / Sápmi	Yungmiqu	"Ánssásat"	Northern Sámi	
Nunavut	Shauna Seeteenak	"Healing"	English / Inuktitut	
Sakha	Saina	"Ньолтэн ьэдьэн" (Dance of the Sun)	Even	
Nord-Norge / Sápmi	Linus Johnsen	"Trineža luohti"	Northern Sámi	
Norra Sverige / Sápmi	NTÏV	"Jábmiidáibmu"	Northern Sámi	

=== Winners ===
Below is an overview of the winners of the various categories in Pan-ArcticVision 2025. The winners were voted on by the public.

Category	Winner	Song
The place in the Arctic that would be the best place to host the next edition of Pan-ArcticVision	(not prize to a song)	
Most revolutionary song	(Iceland) Geðbrigði	
Song that gives the most feeling of community and togetherness	(Sápmi) / (Norway) Linus Johnsen	"Trineža luohti"
Most Arctic song	(Sakha Republic) Saina	"Ньолтэн ьэдьэн" (Dance of the Sun)

== Circumpolar event ==
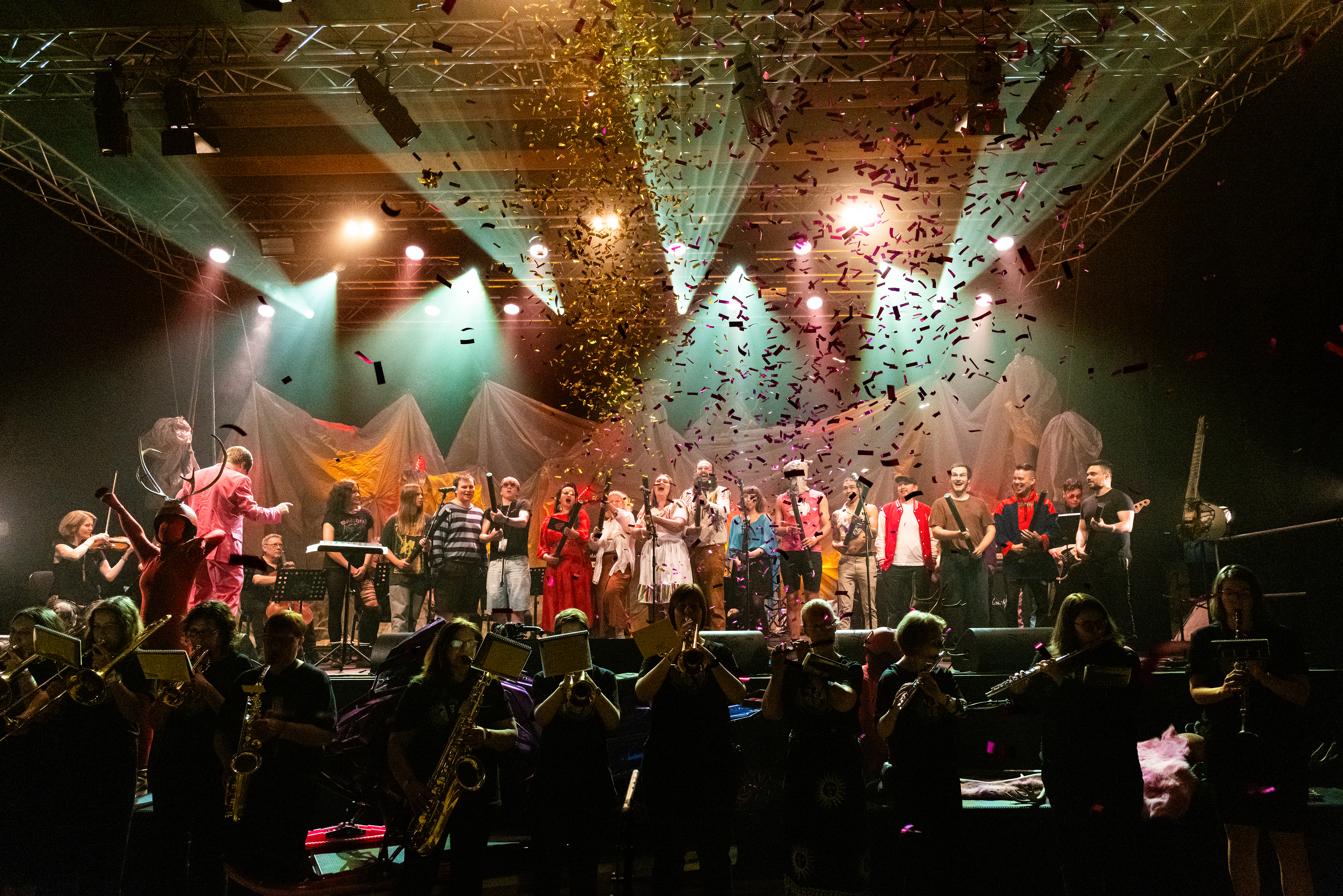
Pan-Arcticvision 2023, Vadsø

The Pan-ArcticVision does not only include parts of the circumpolar north (like the Barents Region, or the Nordics, or the American Arctic or the international Inuit community), but the whole circumpolar north, emphasizing the interconnectedness and unity of the region as a whole, transcending national borders and focusing on shared culture, challenges and opportunities, promoting Pan-Arcticism.

Pan-ArcticVision is initiated, financed and run by Nordting - Northern Assembly, and led by artistic director and entrepreneur Amund Sjølie Sveen, who claims the event is challenging a worldview where the centre (the capitals of nation states) is the starting point.
