= Sväng =

Finnish music group

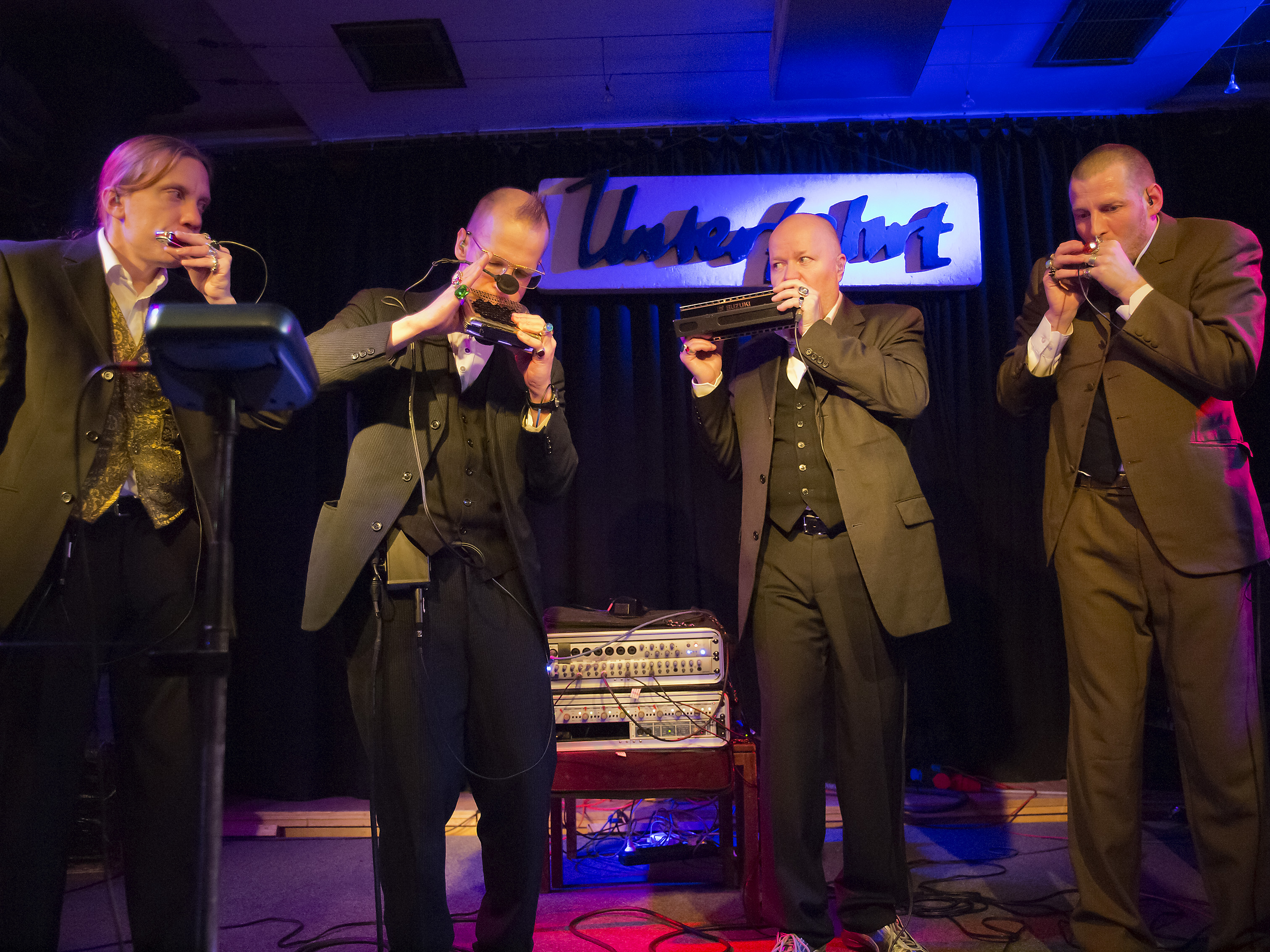
- Sväng at Jazzclub Unterfahrt in Munich/Germany in year 2012

Background information
- Origin: Finland
- Genres: Folk
- Instruments: Harmonica, mouth organ
- Years active: 2003–present
- Label: Gelileo MusicCommunication
- Members: Eero Turkka (chromatic and diatonic harmonicas); Eero Grundström (chromatic and diatonic harmonicas); Pasi Leino (bass harmonica); Jouko Kyhälä (chord harmonica "Harmonetta", chromatic and diatonic harmonicas)
- Website: www.svang.fi

Sväng is a Finnish quartet with each member of the group playing a harmonica and other mouth organ. It was formed by Jouko Kyhälä, and have released five albums since that date.
