= Silla + Rise =

Canadian musical group based in Ottawa

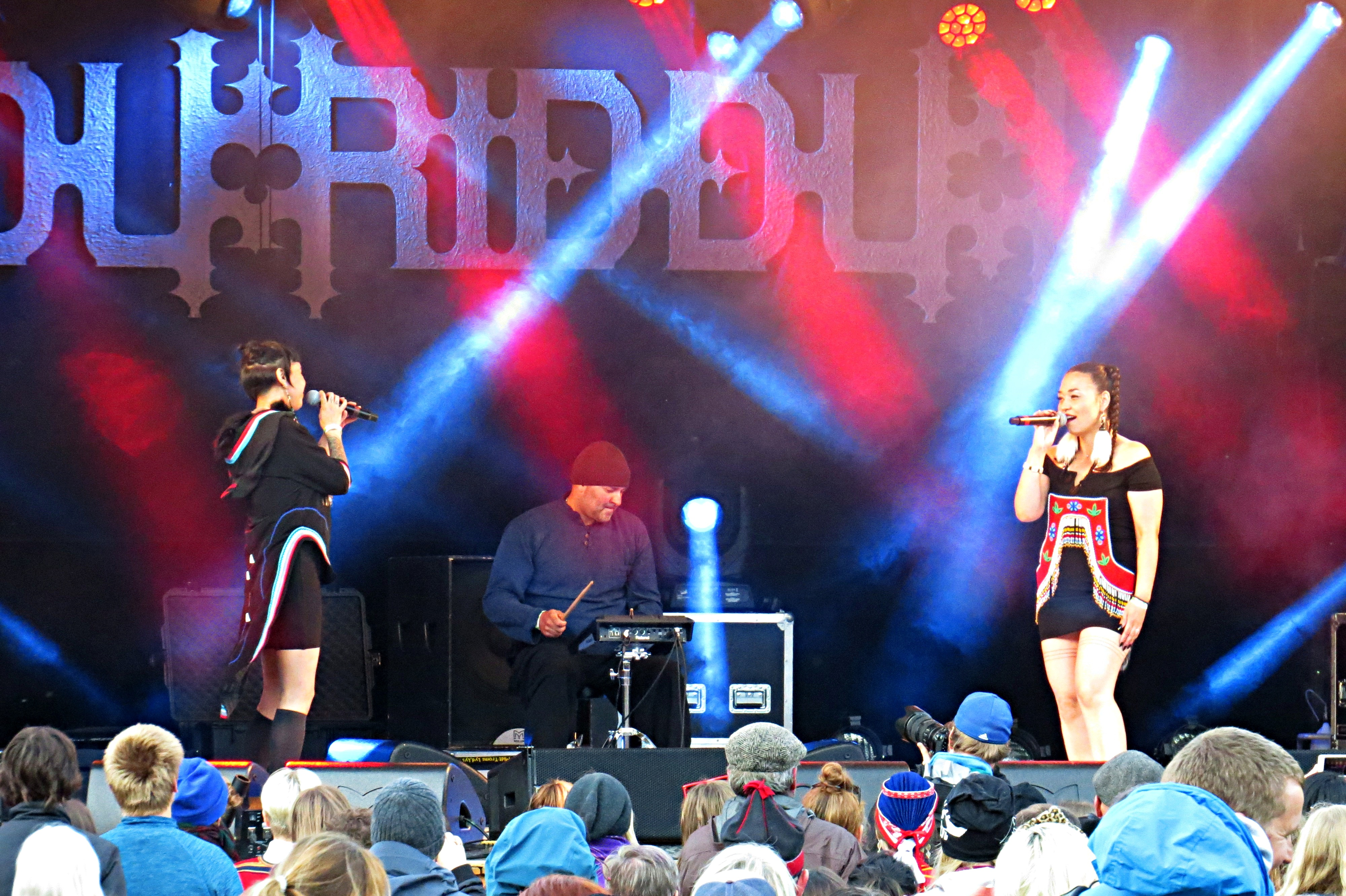
- Silla + Rise at the Riddu Riđđu festival in 2019

Background information
- Origin: Ottawa, Ontario, Canada
- Genres: Dance music, Throat singing, Electro (music)
- Years active: 2017–present
- Members: Cynthia Pitsiulak, Charlotte Qamaniq; Rise Ashen

Silla + Rise are a Canadian musical group based in Ottawa. Their album Debut was a Juno Award nominee for Indigenous Music Album of the Year at the Juno Awards of 2017. Their album Galactic Gala was nominated for World Music Album of the Year at the Juno Awards of 2020.

The group, consisting of vocalists Cynthia Pitsiulak, Charlotte Qamaniq, and DJ Eric "Rise Ashen" Vani, blends traditional Inuit throat singing with electronic dance music. According to the group, the two seemingly divergent music styles have much in common, including how both involve some form of a battle between performers—i.e., whoever laughs first in throat singing loses. Pitsiulak is originally from Kimmirut and Qamaniq is originally from Igloolik. Pitsiulak and Qamaniq have been performing throat singing since 2005.

In 2018, they performed at the imagineNATIVE festival and in 2019 at Riddu Riđđu. In 2021, they performed on FreeUp! The Emancipation Day Special.
