= Vildá =

Finnish world music band

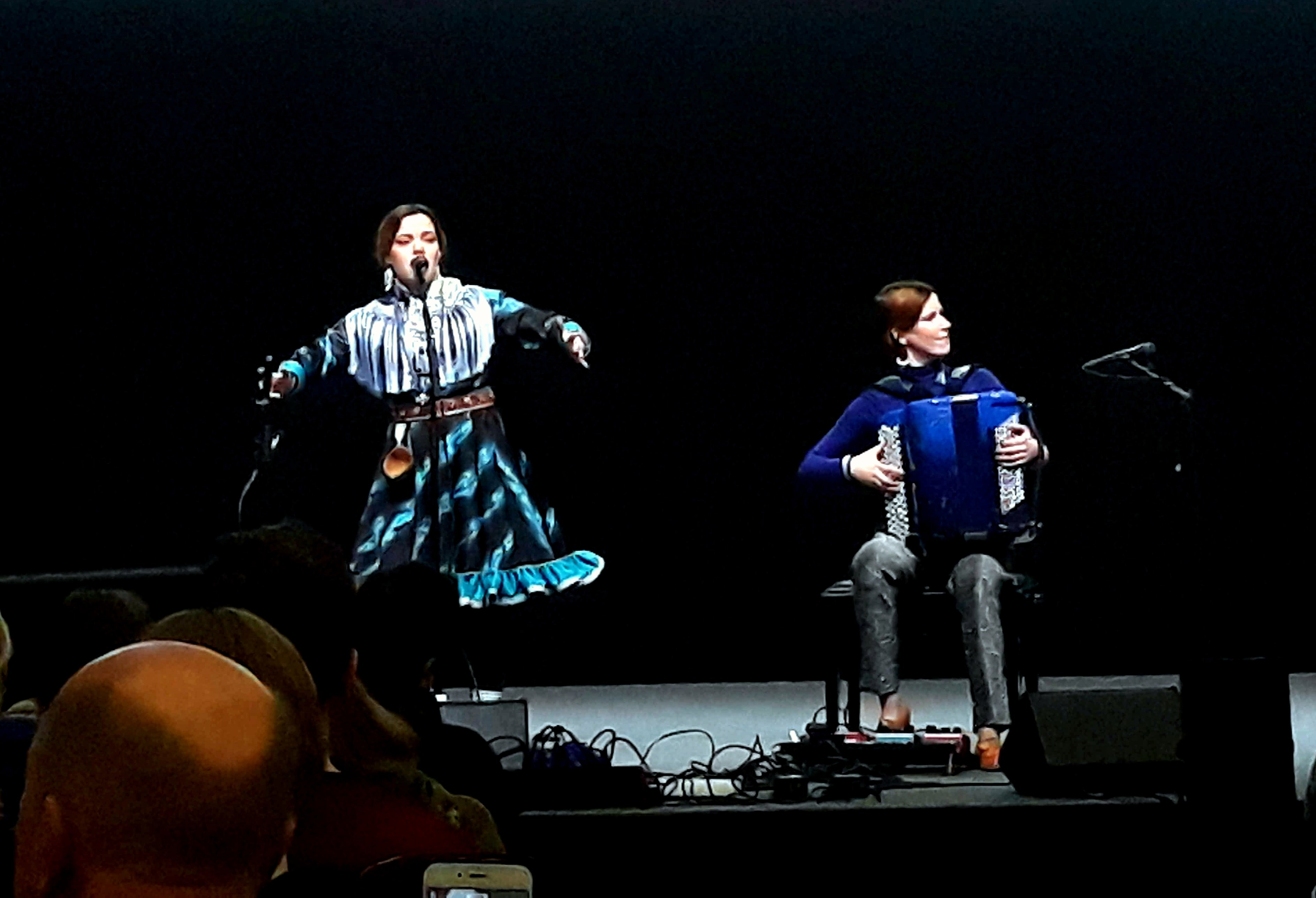
- Vildá in 2019

Background information
- Origin: Finland
- Genres: Folk; world
- Years active: 2016–present
- Labels: Bafe's Factory
- Members: Hildá Länsman; Viivi Maria Saarenkylä

Vildá (often stylized as VILDÁ) is a Finnish world music band formed in 2016 by Sámi singer Hildá Länsman and Finnish accordionist Viivi Maria Saarenkylä. The band's name is a combination of the two artists' names, and vilda means wild in Northern Sámi.

In 2019, Vildá released their debut album Vildaluodda (Wild Print), which combined joik with traditional Finnish music with influences from pop, jazz and tango, with lyrics mainly in Northern Sami. In addition to new songs composed by Länsman and Saarenkylä, the album included an adaptation of Mari Boine's song Goaskinviellja. Vildaluodda entered the European world music charts in 2019.

Vildá has performed in different countries, and in 2019, the duo recorded the song Eymün weke che in the Mapudungun language together with the Ensamble Transatlántico de Folk Chileno. In 2021, they received the Music Moves Europe Talent Award from the European Commission.

== Discography ==
Studio albums

List of Studio albums, with selected details
Title	Details
Vildaluodda	Released: 4 April 2019; Label: Bafe's Factory; Formats: CD, Digital download, streaming
