= Kajsa Balto =

Northern Sámi singer from Norway

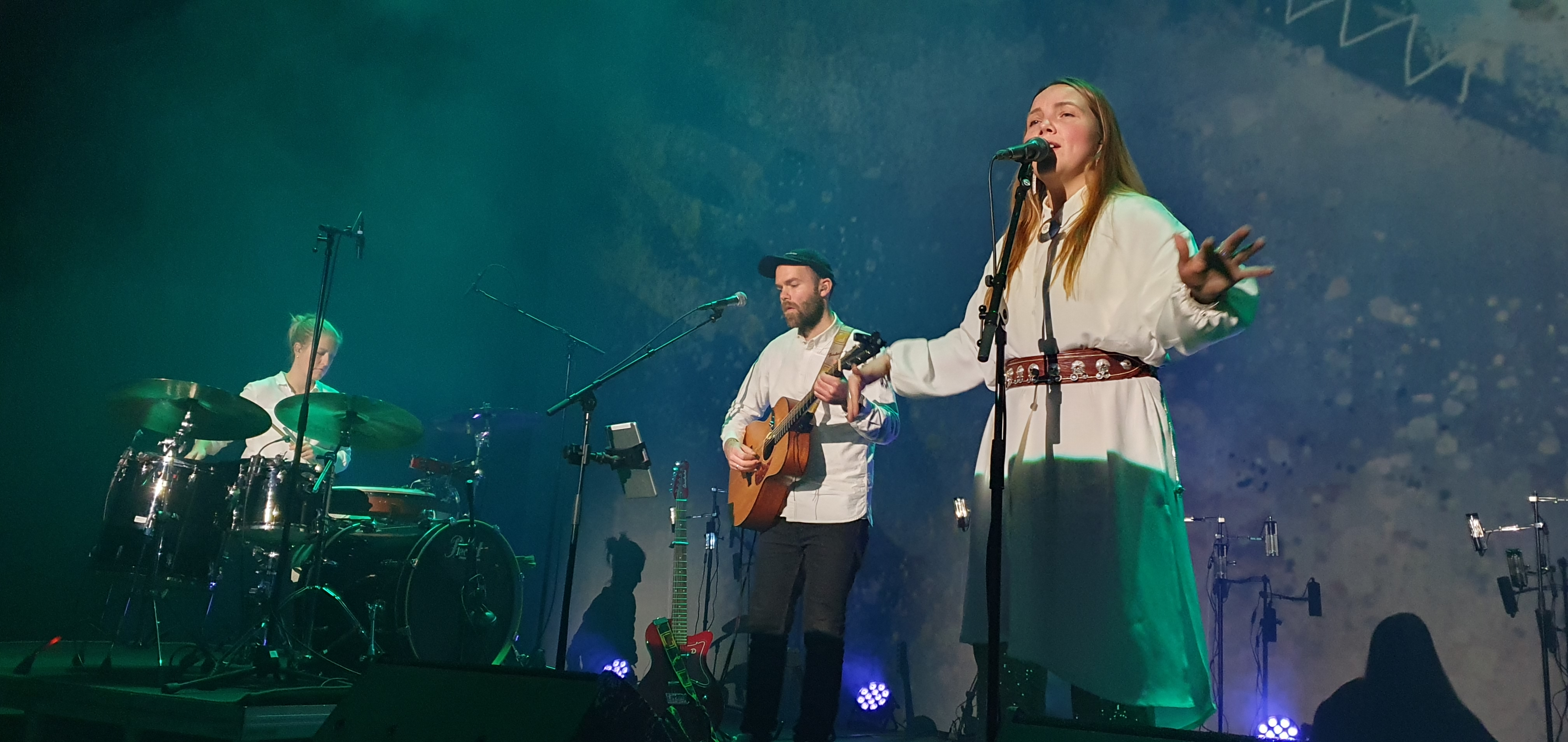
- Kajsa Balto performing in Oslo in 2022

Background information
- Birth name: Kajsa Sogn Balto
- Born: February 6, 1988; Oslo, Norway
- Occupation(s): yoiker, singer, musician
- Instrument(s): voice, piano
- Years active: 2016–
- Labels: DAT
- Website: https://www.kajsabalto.com/

Kajsa Sogn Balto (born February 6, 1988 Oslo, Norway) is a Northern Saami musician, yoiker, and singer from Norway.

== Biography ==
=== Musical style ===
In her music, she takes inspiration from the traditional Northern Saami yoiks, combining them with pop and other genres to create her own style of music. Balto has been described as one of the trailblazers in a new generation of musicians from Sápmi who preserve the Saami musical tradition at the same time they are taking it in new directions.

== Awards ==
In February 2025, Balto won the open class at the Sámi Music Awards. The same year, she has been nominated for the Edvard Prize in the lyrics category for her album Rájás.

== Discography ==
=== Albums ===
- 2017 – Sámi sohka
- 2020 – Buot eallá
- 2021 – Sámi juovllat
- 2024 – Rájás

=== Singles ===
- 2020 – Buot eallá
- 2024 – Rájás
- 2024 – Jeđđenluohti
- 2025 – Beskán
