= Kalevauva.fi =

Finnish band

Kalevauva.fi is a Finnish troubadour group band from Helsinki, singing in Finnish. The band has become famous for its songs published through the Internet, with lyrics gathered from the discussion forums of the Finnish Vauva magazine, other online discussion forums and social media.

The band was originally founded to appear at the Kaustinen Folk Music Festival in summer 2016. However, the band became so popular that it continued its activity after the festival. The videos on the band's YouTube channel had over 6,7 million views in January 2023.

The band has published tens of its songs only on YouTube. Officially the band has published one album and five singles. The album was awarded divided first place at the folk music album of the year contest by Kansanmusiikki magazine in 2017, and the band was also chosen as Vantaa citizen of the year by Vantaan Sanomat in 2017.

== Discography ==
=== Studio albums ===
- Kalevauva.fi (2017)
- SOME FOLK (2020)
- Kaupunkilaulut (2022)

=== Singles ===
- "Mies syö lapsen vanukkaat !!" (2017)
- "Jyväskylä" (2017)
- "Vantaa" (2017)
- "Kouvola" (2018)
- "Nykymusiikki on niin kamalaa" (feat. VG+ and Mira Luoti) (2018)
- "Lomalle lompsis #kiitollinensiunattuonnellinen" (2019)
- "Sorvin ääreen #oravanpyörä" (2019)
- "Joulustressi" (2019)
- "Annatteko lastenne leikkiä vuokratalojen lasten kanssa?" (2020)
- "Kuopio" (2021)
- "Espoo" (feat. Club For Five) (2022)
- "Hämeenlinna" (2024)

=== Appearing on ===
- Teflon Brothers - "Juhannussimaa" (2019)
