= Hildá Länsman =

Finnish Sámi singer (born 1993)

Ánn-Ovllá Káre Jari Hildá Hildá Länsman
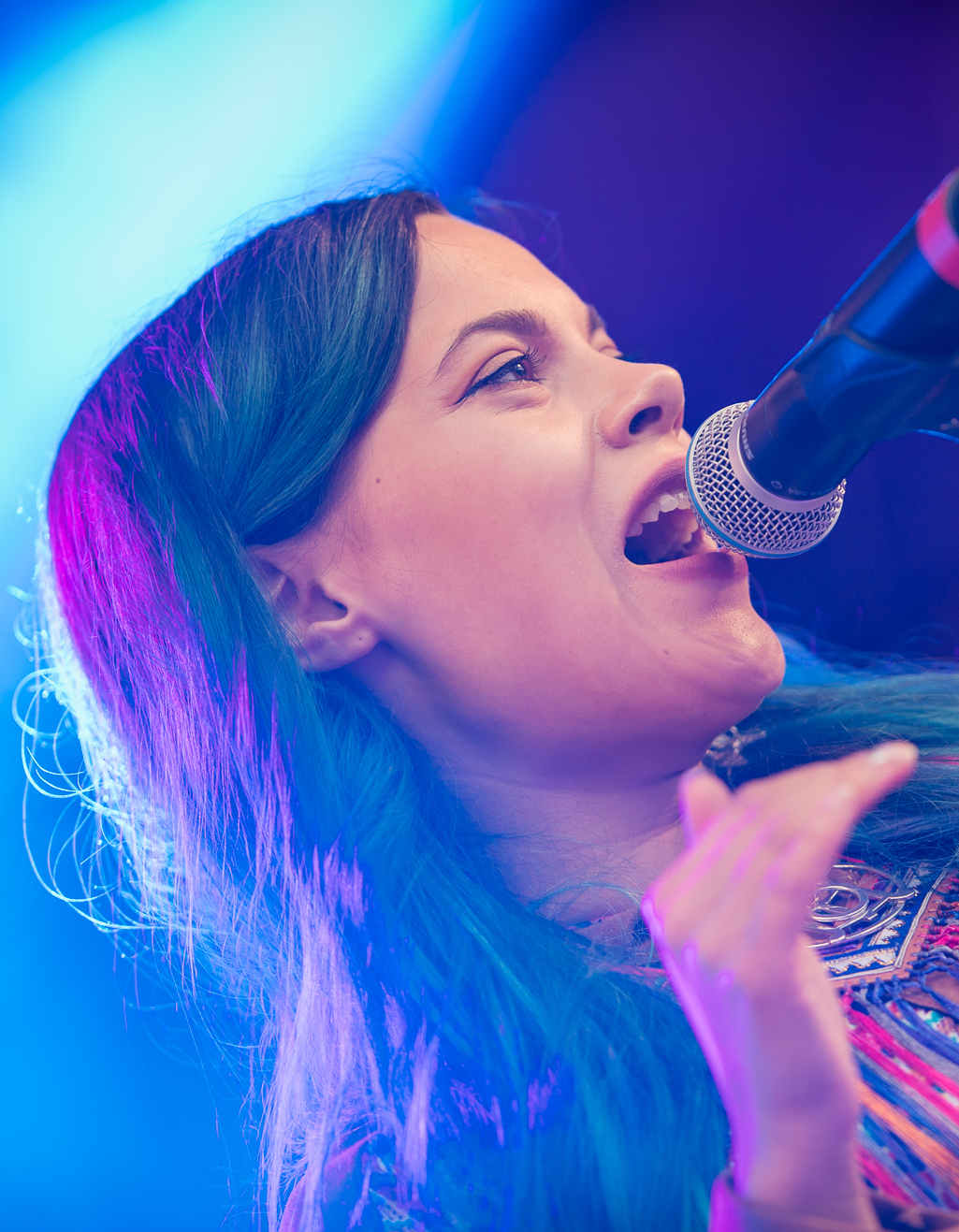
- Hildá Länsman at the Riddu Riđđu festival (2018)

Background information
- Born: 1993 (age 32–33)
- Genres: Yoik, rock, blues, pop
- Occupation: Musician
- Instruments: Vocalist, yoik
- Member of: Vildá, Solju, Gájanas
- Website: https://www.hildalansman.com/

Hildá Birget Länsman (born 1993), also known by her Sámi name Ánn-Ovllá Káre Jari Hildá, is a Sámi singer-songwriter and musician. She is a vocalist and yoikist in the bands Vildá, Solju, and Gájanas. In 2025, Länsman made her solo debut with the album Dajan.

== Life and career ==
Born in Ohcejohka, Finland, Hildá Länsman is the daughter of Ulla Pirttijärvi, a yoiker and singer, and Jari Länsman, a reindeer herder. She took to traditional culture at an early age; the singer recounts creating a yoik for the moon when she was three. Länsman's first professional recording was at eight years old, playing a joik on the album Máttaráhku Askái (2002). She later studied music at Helsinki's Sibelius Academy.

=== 2011-2015: Solju ===
In 2011, Länsman composed and sang on Inger-Mari Aikio-Arianaick's album Ima Hutkosat. This was a project specifically for celebrating Sámi culture, each track having its own music video to reach as wide an audience as possible. Of the work, Aikio said: "There are only a few music videos made in Sámi language, so (this project) gives so many opportunities for children to enjoy music visually." Länsman also appeared in some of the music videos alongside fellow musician Niillas Holmberg.

Länsman featured on Ailu Valle's Dušši Dušše Duššat album in 2012. In 2014, Länsman formed the duo Solju (Brooch) with her mother, Ulla Pirttijärvi. Solju placed third with the song "Hold Your Colours" in the pre-Eurovision Finnish contest UMK in 2015.

=== 2016–2018: Gájanas, Ođđa Áigodat, Vildaluodda ===
In 2016, Länsman debuted as the vocalist and yoikist for Gájanas (Echo). Described as a "progressive folk rock" band, the group builds its work around themes inspired by Sámi culture. Other members include Nicholas Francett on guitar, cello and vocals, Kevin Francett on drums, and Erkki Feodoroff on bass. The band placed second in the Sámi Grand Prix in 2016, and later were awarded Band of the Year during the folk music festival Kaustinen in 2017.

Solju released the album Ođđa Áigodat (New Times) in 2018; the tracks, all in the Northern Sámi language, are inspired by traditional yoiking and contemporary pop. They include "Heargevuoddji" (Reindeer Driver), "Irgeávnnas" (Boyfriend-to-Be) and the title number "Ođđa Áigodat"

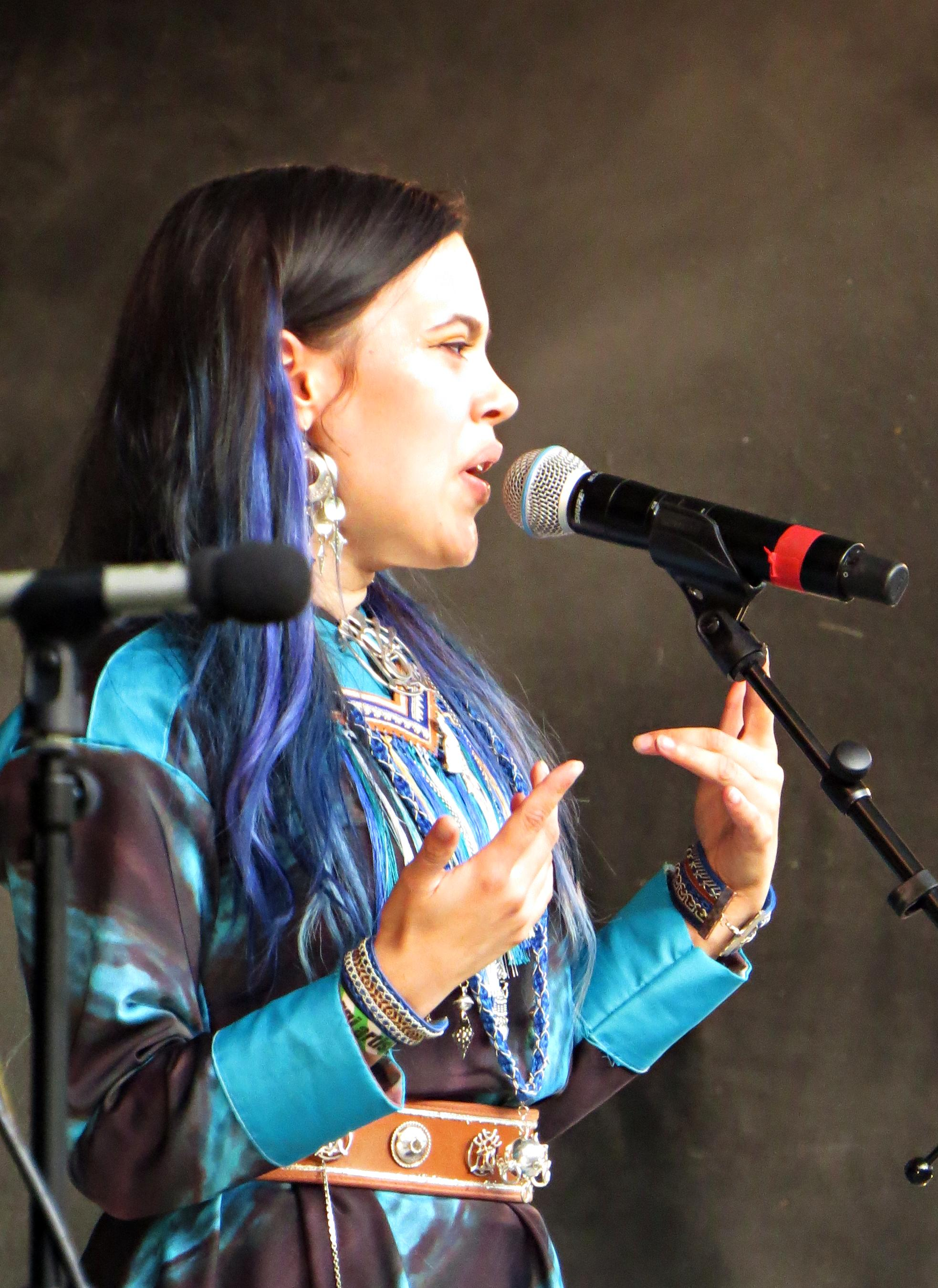
Performing at the 2019 Riddu Riđđu music festival

=== 2019-2023: Vildá, Čihkkojuvvon, Uvjamuohta, Vildaluodda ===
In January 2019, Solju received the Folk Music Creator prize at the Finnish Ethnogala. The duo also won the prize for the Best International Indigenous Release at the Canadian Indigenous Music Awards (2019).

The album Vildaluodda (Wildprint) was released in April 2019 as Vildá's debut, a duo of Länsman as vocalist and Viivi Maria Saarenkylä on accordion. The album, described as a blend of indigenous Sámi yoiks, accordion rhythms and improvisation, included original compositions alongside a cover of Mari Boine's "Goaskinviellja".

In 2021, Gájanas released their debut album Čihkkojuvvon (Hidden). Länsman also won the Sámi Grand Prix in 2021 as a duo with Lávre Johan Eira. Solju then released their second studio album, Uvjamuohta (Powder Snow), in 2022. It charted at number four in the World Music Charts, and number six in the Transglobal Music Charts.

=== 2024–present: Dajan ===
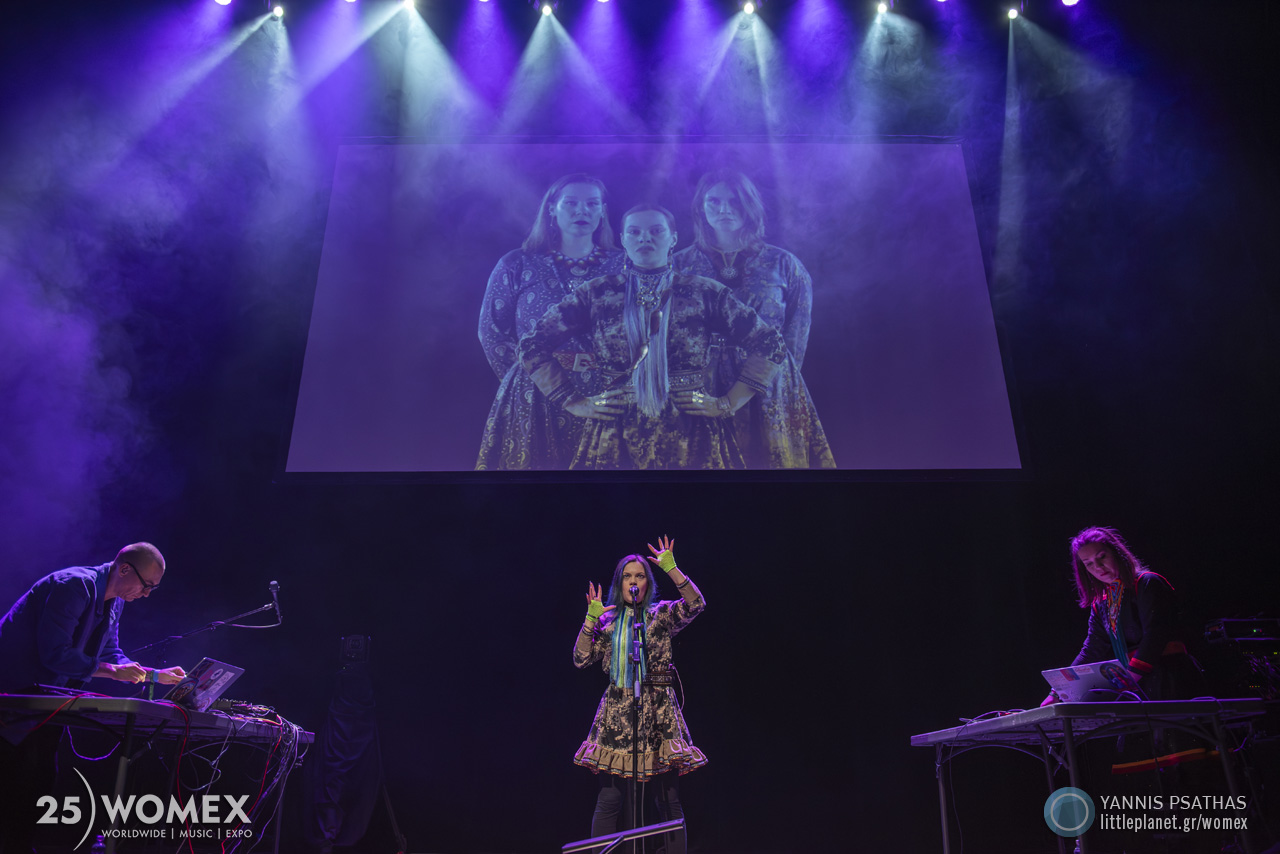
Womex 2025

Through 2024, Länsman released the singles "Čuojahat Mu" (Resonance), "Vizardit" (The Chirping of Birds), and "Čálkko Niillas". This culminated in the release of her debut solo album Dajan in 2025, a collaborative work alongside music artist Tuomas Norvio. In a Music Finland interview, Lansman said: “Tuomas is the ‘electronic scientist,’ and I come from the world of yoik and Sámi storytelling (...) We didn’t want to restrict ourselves creatively at all." The two later performed songs from the album at the Ijahis Idja and Hiljaisuus festivals.

== Personal life ==
Länsman describes herself as "melancholic", enjoying the polar nights of Finnish winters. "When I was three years old I made a yoik for the moon and my little brother at that age made a yoik for the sun... that maybe shows the difference in our personalities." In 2019, Länsman said that singing in Sámi is important to her and feels natural. She has said she gets inspiration for her music from "all sorts of situations", such as when walking outside or when reading.

=== Activism ===
In 2023, Länsman spoke of the importance of nature conservation and efforts to preserve Sámi culture, explaining, "When politics and money meet, it can get dangerous for nature. That’s how the land can be taken from the people who have been living with it for ages. They have the power to make a price for things you cannot actually measure with money." She has also supported mental health awareness and its place in cultural efforts: "I wish there was more room to share more about Sámi health, well-being, culture, and perspectives on a deeper level (...) I want to remind us to take care of our own mental health, and our self-determination. We must start with individual healing before we can truly begin to heal and rebuild our homeland."

Länsman has highlighted the dangers of climate change, and has campaigned against mining efforts in the Käsivarre area.

== Awards ==
In 2017, Länsman won the Intersection Prize, awarded by the Global Music Centre. In 2018, Ulla Pirttijärvi and Länsman won the Vuoden Etnotekijä prize from the Finnish Music Publishers Association. In January 2019, Solju received the Folk Music Creator prize at the Finnish Ethnogala. Solju also won the prize for the Best International Indigenous Release at the Canadian Indigenous Music Awards (2019).

== Discography ==
=== Studio albums as soloist ===
- Dajan (2025)

=== Studio albums as Solju ===
- Ođđa Áigodat (2018)
- Ođđa Áigodat (Remixed) (2020)
- Uvjamuohta (2022)

=== Studio albums as Gájanas ===
- Čihkkojuvvon (2021)

=== Studio albums as Vildá ===
- Vildaluodda (2019)

=== Collaboration albums ===
- Ima hutkosat (2011)

=== Compilation albums ===
- Sámi Grand Prix 2021 (2021)

=== Singles ===
- 2018 – Hildá: Muittut
- 2018 – Heargevuoddji, with Solju
- 2019 – Utsjoki-disko, juávhoin VILDÁ
- 2020 – Remember your name, Pt. 1, with VILDÁ
- 2020 – Remember your name, Pt. 2, with VILDÁ
- 2020 – Diamántadulvvit, with Gájanas
- 2021 – Ovddos / Hivumuuniq, with VILDÁ & PIQSIQ
- 2022 – Oassi Mus, with Solju
- 2024 – Čuojahat Mu, with Hildá Länsman & Tuomas Norvio
- 2024 – Vizardit, with Hildá Länsman & Tuomas Norvio
- 2024 – Čálkko Niillas, with Hildá Länsman & Tuomas Norvio

=== Other appearances ===
- 2002 – Ulla Pirttijärvi: De juoiggas
- 2002 – Ulla Pirttijärvi: Gádja Nillá
- 2012 – Ailu Valle: Gudnejahtatgo?
- 2018 – Anna Murtola: La llama
- 2018 – Aurora Hentunen: Tunturi
- 2018 – Don Johnson Big Band: The Sun
- 2018 – Mikko Heikinpoika: Polar Night
- 2018 – Tero Hetero: Tahdon
- 2020 – Elin & The Woods: Dearvvuođat Sámis
- 2020 – Elin & The Woods: I'm Nature
- 2020 – Ensamble Transatlántico de Folk Chileno: Eymün weke che

, with VILDÁ

- 2020 – Nathan Riki Thomson: Oaidnemeahttun/Invisible
- 2021 – Emil Kárlsen & Lávre: Gii dan livčče...
- 2022 – Ailu Valle, Amoc, Hildá Länsman, Heidi Gauriloff: Steehlaz Kååvas
