= Northern Parliament =

Norwegian political movement

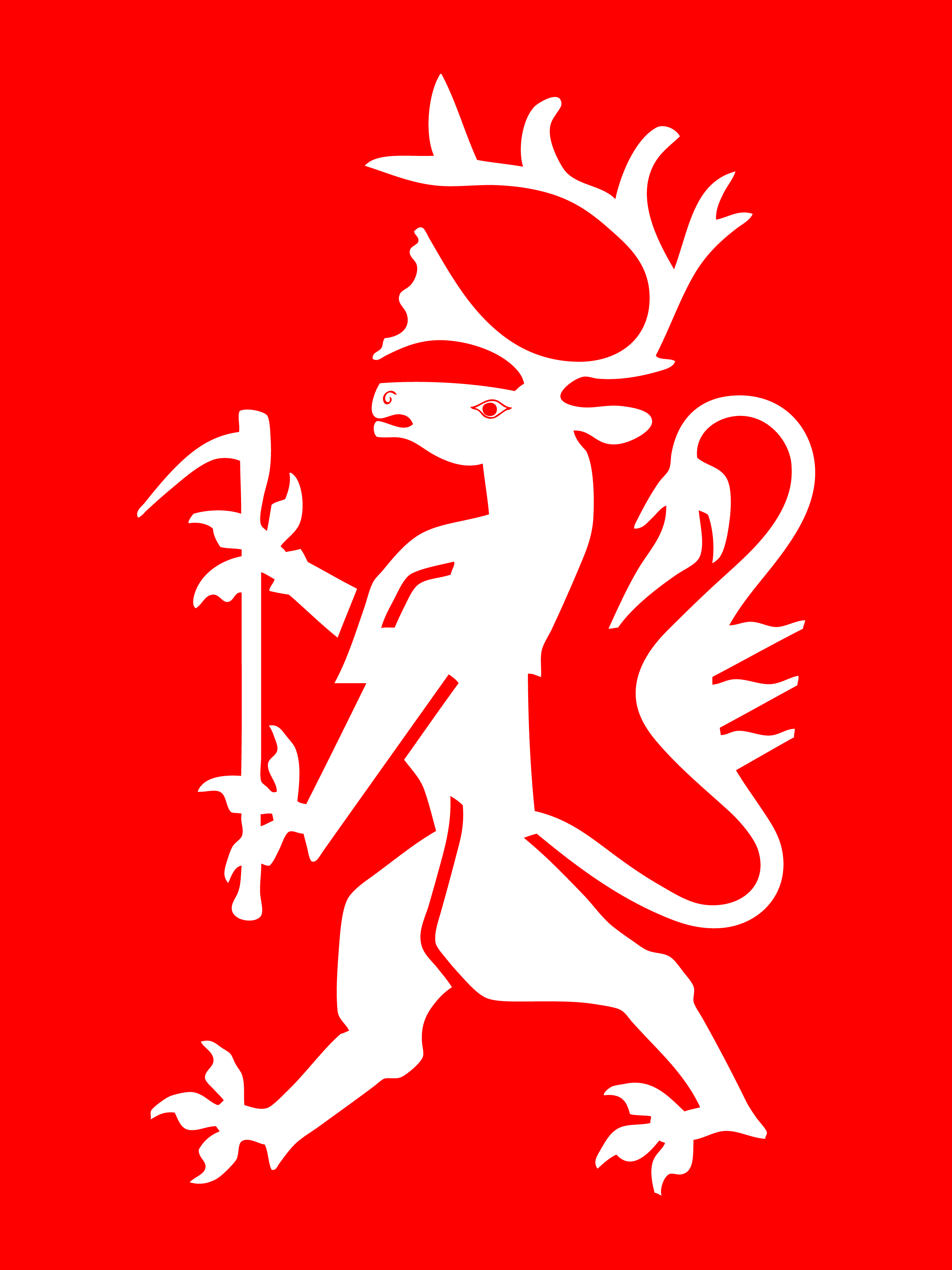
The symbol of the Northern Parliament is a reindeer lion in profile holding a fishing gaff, in the style of the Norwegian national coat of arms, which originally is holding an axe.

The Northern Parliament (In Norwegian: NORDTING, translated to Northern Assembly) is a popular movement that promotes and discusses socio-political issues related to Northern Norway and the Arctic / High North, such as ownership of natural resources, centralization, democracy, capitalism and populism. The Northern Parliament submitted a list for the 2017 parliamentary election and is led by Amund Sjølie Sveen.

== History ==
The first Nordtinget took place in 2014 as part of the Arctic Arts Festival, with then-Minister of Culture Thorild Widvey as the opening speaker. The project was initially a one-off event to mark the constitutional anniversary and the festival's 50th anniversary. The event sparked a great deal of debate, both because of the critical coverage of Statoil as a sponsoring partner for cultural life in Northern Norway, and because of the coverage of Kjell Inge Røkke and the government's fisheries policy. Former Minister of Fisheries for the Conservative Party and then-County Governor of Troms, Svein Ludvigsen, was one of those who clearly expressed his dissatisfaction with the project in the media. However, the project was also defended by several others, including theatre director Nina Wester. Nordlys was one of the newspapers that described the project as important.

Nordting has been led by Amund Sjølie Sveen since the beginning. Other important contributors have included Erik Stifjell and Liv Hanne Haugen.

== Public assemblies ==
Since 2014, the Northern Parliament has organized public assemblies in a number of locations and in collaboration with a number of institutions and organizers, including in Harstad in collaboration with the Arctic Arts Festival, Kirkenes in collaboration with the company The Girls on the Bridge, Tromsø in collaboration with Hålogaland Teater, Honningsvåg in collaboration with the North Cape Film Festival, and Træna as part of the Traena Music Festival.

From 2019, the Northern Parliament has gradually focused its activities more on the pan-Arctic area, and has visited Reykjavík and Akureyri as part of the Arctic Circle, Rovaniemi (2019) as part of the Arctic Arts Summit, and Anchorage, Alaska (2019) in collaboration with the Anchorage Museum. A total of 49 From 2019, Nordting has gradually focused its activities more on the pan-Arctic area, and has visited Reykjavík and Akureyri as part of the Arctic Circle, Rovaniemi (2019) as part of the Arctic Arts Summit, and Anchorage, Alaska ( 2019) in collaboration with the Anchorage Museum. A total of 49 Northern Parliaments had been held by the end of 2019.

The social restrictions due to the coronavirus pandemic from 13 March 2020 also affected the Northern Parliament's ability to hold public meetings. As of 1 January 2022, a total of 60 public meetings had been held since its inception in 2014, the most recent in Nuuk, Greenland /Kalaallit Nunat.

== Parliamentary Elections ==
NORDTING submitted a list in Troms for the 2017 Norwegian parliamentary election. Amund Sjølie Sveen was at the top of the list. The list received 58 votes.

== Controversies ==
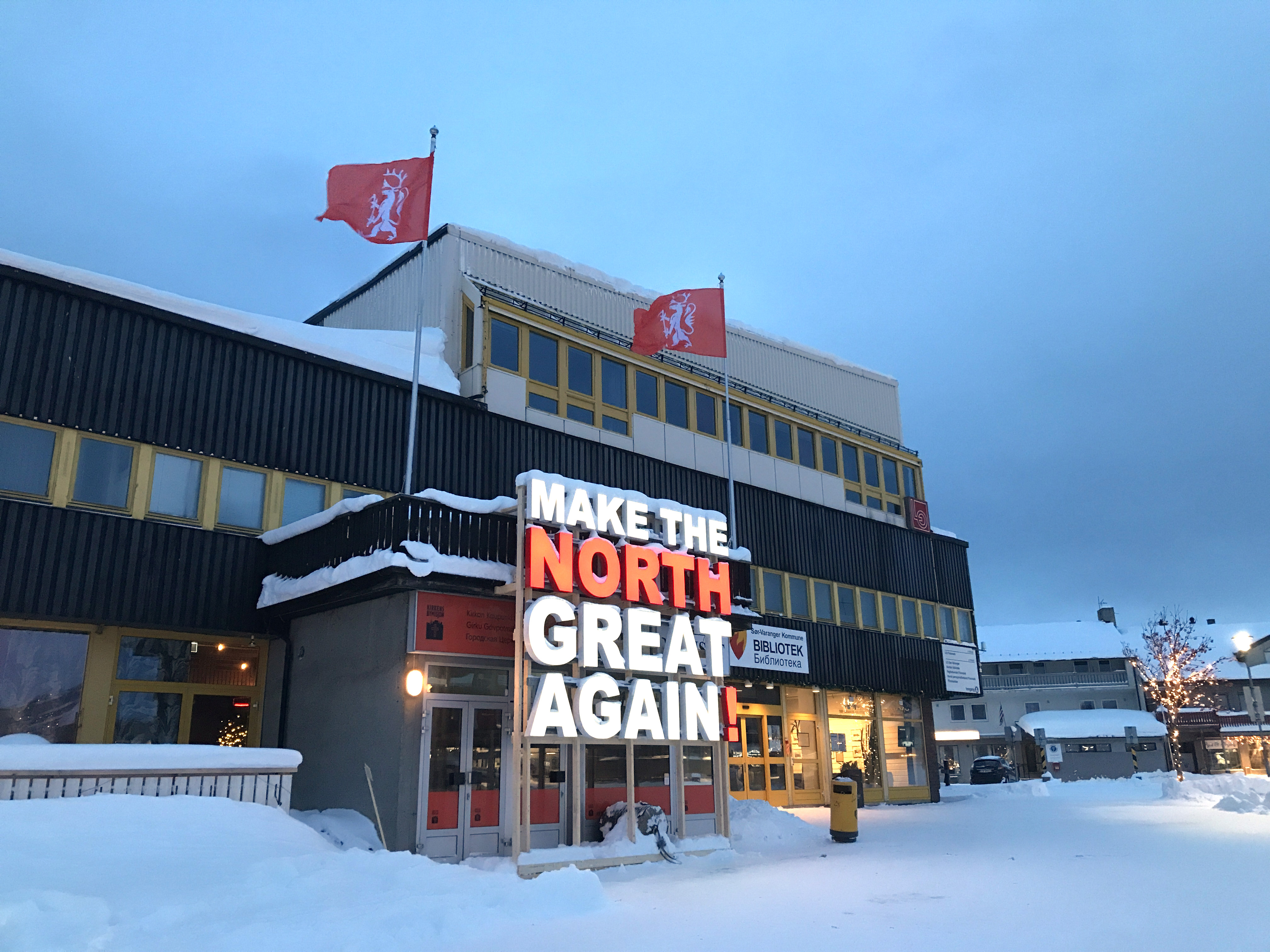
Nordting's light installation "Make the North Great Again" in the square in Kirkenes, February 2022, as part of the Barents Spektacle festival.

In 2019, the project sparked debate when Sveen and the Northern Parliament opened the Arctic Arts Festival, and ended the event by serving vodka to the audience. Afterwards, the municipal doctor in Harstad reported both Sveen and the festival to the police for illegal serving.

During the same period, the Northern Parliament announced that they would carry out a "rich safari" in Harstad. However, the project was cancelled after a strong request from the Festival's director.

In the fall of 2020, the Northern Parliament opened a new light installation in Longyearbyen on Svalbard. The installation, which was 4x4 meters in size, displayed the words "MAKE THE NORTH GREAT AGAIN!". The artwork was presented in collaboration with the Nordnorsk Kunstmuseum and led to great debate locally and nationally. The installation has since been shown in Nuuk (GL), in the Nordic House on the Faroe Islands and in Kirkenes as part of the Barents Spektacle.

In 2021 and 2022, the Nordting marked the anniversaries of several historical events during the Alta controversy (1979–1982). On 14 January 2021, the Northern Parliament held a memorial service on the 40th anniversary of the police operation at the site known as Nullpunktet. On 20 March 2022, the Nordting marked the 40th anniversary of the Sami activists, including Niillas Somby, placing explosive charges at a bridge in Øvre Stilla in Alta in 1982. The bridge has later become colloquially known as Sombybrua in Alta. The Northern Parliament erected road signs both at the bridge and at Nullpunktet, which led to renewed debate about whether both the name and the signage should be made official.

== Projects ==
The Northern Parliament is also behind Pan-ArcticVision, a "Eurovision for the Arctic", with participating musicians from all over the circumpolar north; Alaska, northern Canada, Kalaallit Nunaat (Greenland), Iceland, the Faroe Islands, northern Norway, northern Sweden, northern Finland and northern Russia. The international musical mustering has been held annually since 2023. In 2025, the event was held in Iqaluit in northern Canada.

May 14th 2026, Nordting marked the 200 years anniversary of the border between Norway and present day Russia with a series of live streams along the 200 kilometer border, stating that in the present day political climate (with the ongoing war in Ukraine) no one else would mark this important historical happening and present day defining border, so the artists had to do the job.

June 21st 2026, on the national day of Kalaallit Nunaat, Nordting installed an unauthorized information sign by the statue of the missionary Hans Egede outside of the Marble Church in central Copenhagen. They stated that the history of oppression that Egede’s mission to Greenland was a part of, had to be communicated along with the celebration which the statue implies. The sign was later removed by the church. In 2024, Nordting installed similar signs on three statues of Egede in Norway.
