= Charlotte Qamaniq =

Canadian North Baffin Inuk throat singer

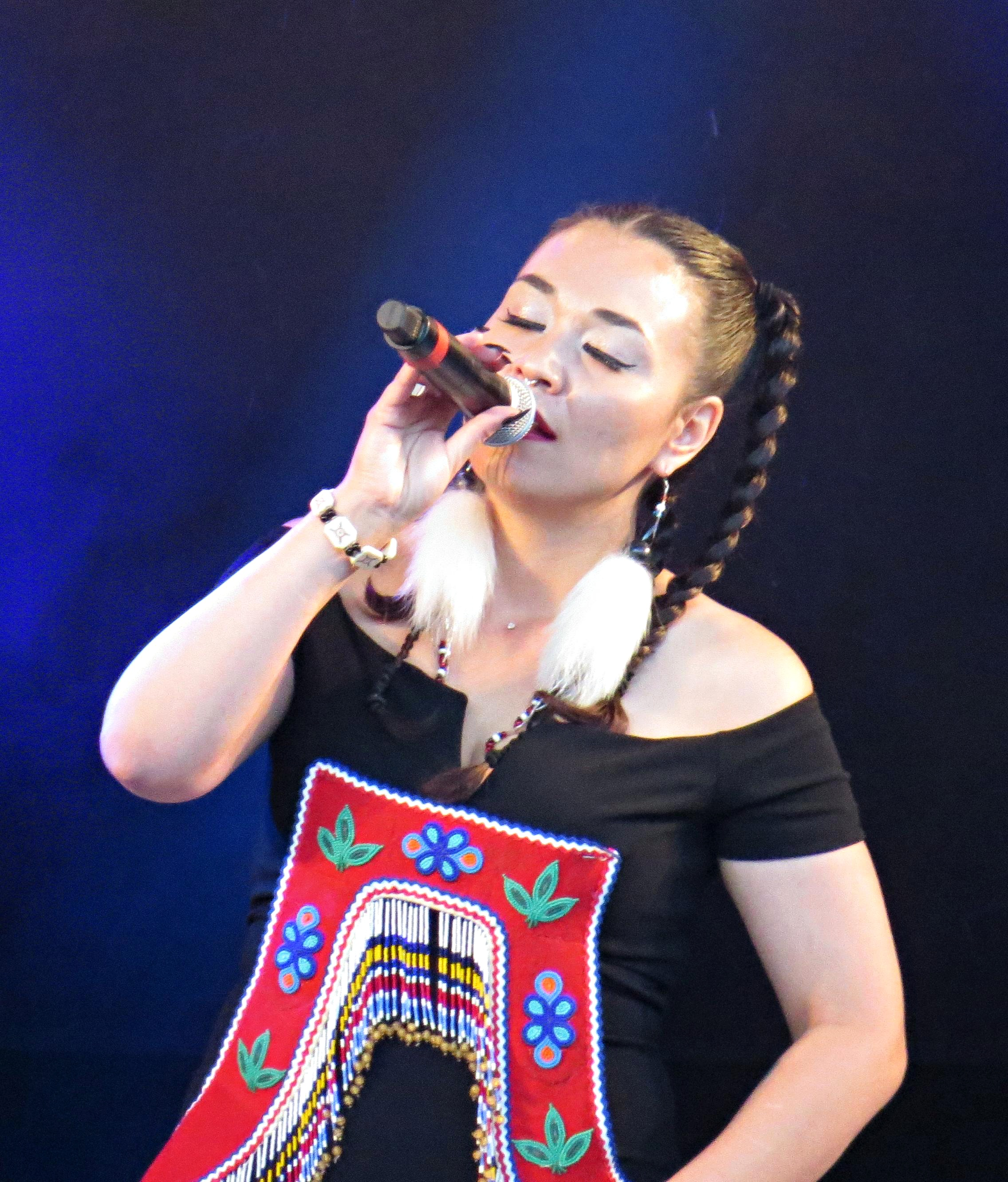
- Qamaniq in 2019
- Other names: Charlotte Qamaniq-Mason

Charlotte Angugaattiaq Qamaniq is a Canadian North Baffin Inuk performance artist, actor, and contemporary and traditional throat singer from Igloolik, Nunavut. She is best known for her work in the throat singing duo Silla, and the bands Silla + Rise and Iva and Angu.

== Early life ==
Qamaniq grew up in Nunavut, Canada and moved to Ottawa when she was 16 years old. She started to learn throat singing the next year, and was performing by the age of 18. She travelled around Canada at this time, raising awareness about youth suicide.

== Career ==
In 2005, Qamaniq co-created the throat singing duo Silla, a singing group blending divergent styles of traditional and contemporary katajjaq across a wide range of genres. Their first album, Tumivut, was released in 2007 and the duo performed the album in Kangirsuk.

In 2015 Silla teamed up with global grooves producer Rise Ashen to create Silla + Rise. Their first album, Debut, was nominated for a Juno Award for Indigenous Album of the Year. Their second album, Galactic Gala, was released in 2019 and was nominated for the Juno World Music Album of the Year in 2020. The group's third album was Silarjuaq.

In 2022, Qamaniq co-created throat singing duo Iva and Angu with Kathleen Ivaluarjuk Merritt and released their first album, Katajjausiit.

In 2024 Qamaniq joined with Gingger Shankar to record a song Ever So Lonely/Eyes/Ocean as a tribute to nature; the song was released on Earth Day. In October 2024 Qamaniq and Kathleen Merritt won the award for 'Most Arctic Song' during the 2024 Pan-Arctic Vision competition.

Qamaniq debuted as an actress in Qaggiavuut’s Kiviuq Returns. In 2023, Qamaniq acted with a musical role for HBO’s True Detective: Night Country, starring Jodie Foster.
