= SomBy =

SomBy is a Sámi rock band from the Finnish side of Sápmi that sings in Northern Sámi. The band was founded in Vuotso in 2004. At that point in time, the band consisted solely of girls. Its line-up experienced some changes in November 2007 when two boys from Inari joined.

In 2008, they signed with Tuupa Records, a recording company that represents a number of artists including Skolt Sámi rocker Tiina Sanila. In 2008, they published their first EP and are working on a full-length album to be published in September 2009.

In 2009, the band won the Sámi Grand Prix with their song "Ii iđit vel", the lyrics for which were written by Milla Pulska and set to music by Oula Guttorm. They will be touring the major Sámi music festivals during the summer, including Márkomeannu and Ijahis Idja.

== Line-up ==
- Miira Suomi, vocals
- Milla Pulska, piano
- Unna-Maari Pulska, drums
- Juho Kiviniemi, bass
- Oula Guttorm, guitar
- JIM "O.G" Somby rapper

== Liet-Lávlut 2009 ==
SomBy won first place at the Liet-Lávlut 2009 competition of minority-language bands.

== Čáhppes Lasttat 2008 ==
The band published their first EP "Čáhppes Lasttat" at the Ijahis idja festival on May 24, 2008. The record was produced by Jussi Isokoski. In 2023, 'Čáhppes Lasttat' celebrated its 15th anniversary with a special re-release featuring bonus tracks and live recordings.

The EP has the following tracks on it:

1. Duoggi (lyrics: Milla Pulska, music: Oula Guttorm)
2. Gáddálas (lyrics: Milla Pulska and Miira Suomi, music: Oula Guttorm)
3. Unna Jalla (lyrics and music: Milla Pulska)
4. Doarrun Duoddaris (lyrics: Milla Pulska and Miira Suomi, music: Milla Pulska and Oula Guttorm)
5. Ránisvuohta (lyrics and music: Milla Pulska)
