= Liet International =

European music competition

- Genre: Music competition
- Inaugurated: 28 April 2002; 24 years ago
- Most recent: 22 November 2024
- Patron: Council of Europe
- Website: liet-international.com

Liet International (West Frisian: Liet Ynternasjonaal), formerly Liet-Lávlut, is a European music competition for songs in minority and regional languages. The inaugural edition took place on 28 April 2002 as a spin-off of the West Frisian-language song contest Liet (transl. 'Song'), held annually in Leeuwarden, Netherlands since 1991.

Since 2006, Liet International has been held in a different city each year. The 2006 and 2008 editions, held in the Swedish part of Sápmi, were titled Liet-Lávlut (lávlut is Northern Sámi for 'sing'). The contest was cancelled in 2007 and 2013 when the hosting organisations, in Narbonne and Corsica respectively, backed out at a late stage, and in 2020, due to the COVID-19 pandemic. No Liet International was scheduled in 2005, 2015, 2016, 2019, 2021, 2023, 2025, and 2026.

Due to its similarities to the Eurovision Song Contest, the competition has been dubbed the 'Eurovision of minority languages'. It has been organised under the auspices of the Council of Europe since 2008.

== Overview ==
Table key
◇	Contest cancelled

Year	Date	Host city	Jury award winner		
Year	Date	Host city	Language	Artist	Song
2002	28 April	(Netherlands) Leeuwarden	Catalan	Pomada	"En pere gallerí"
2003	23 November	(Netherlands) Leeuwarden	Southern Sámi	Transjoik	"Mijjajaa"
2004	22 October	(Netherlands) Leeuwarden	Northern Sámi	Niko Valkeapää	"Rabas mielain"
2006	14 October	(Sweden) Östersund	Northern Sámi	Johan Kitti and Ellen Sara Bæhr	"Luđiin muitalan"
2007	None ◇	(France) Narbonne ◇	Contest cancelled ◇		
2008	18 October	(Sweden) Luleå	Corsican	Jacques Culioli	"Hosanna in excelsis"
2009	31 October	(Netherlands) Leeuwarden	Northern Sámi	SomBy	"Ii iđit vel"
2010	27 November	(France) Lorient	Faroese	Orka	"Rúmdardrongurin"
2011	19 November	(Italy) Udine	West Frisian	Janna Eijer	"Ien klap"
2012	1 December	(Spain) Gijón	Breton	Lleuwen	"Ar gouloù bev"
2013	None ◇	(France) Corsica ◇	Contest cancelled ◇		
2014	12 December	(Germany) Oldenburg	Ladin	Martina Iori	"Via con mia mùsega"
2017	13 April	(Norway) Kautokeino	Northern Sámi	Ella Marie Hætta Isaksen	"Luoddaearru"
2018	23 May	(Netherlands) Leeuwarden	Cornish	The Rowan Tree	"Tresor"
2020	3–4 April ◇	(Denmark) Aabenraa ◇	Contest cancelled ◇		
2022	13 May	(Denmark) Tønder	Corsican	Doria	"Roma"
2024	22 November	(France) Bastia	Ladino	Nani Vazana	"Una segunda piel"

== Past editions ==
Table key
1	Jury award winner
◇	Public award (or musicians' award) winner

=== 2002 ===
The first Liet International song contest was held on 28 April 2002 at De Harmonie in Leeuwarden, Netherlands, one day after the Liet song contest. Both the jury and public awards were won by the Catalan band Pomada with the song "En pere gallerí".

Liet International 2002
R/O	Language	Artist	Song	Place
1	Breton	Stone Age	"Stoned gavotenn"	2
2	Irish	Le Chéile Trio	[?]	4–10
3	Northern Sámi	Angelit	"Hobo"	3
4	Kashubian	Chëcz	"Król"	4–10
5	Occitan	Mescladissa	[?]	4–10
6	Welsh	Gwerinos	[?]	4–10
7	West Frisian	Flat Out!	"Fûgelfrij"	4–10
8	North Frisian	Da Åntretemåntre	[?]	4–10
9	Basque	Bat Bitten	[?]	4–10
10	Catalan	Pomada	"En pere gallerí"	1 ◇

=== 2003 ===
The second Liet International contest was again held at De Harmonie in Leeuwarden, Netherlands, on 23 November 2003. Transjoik, a Sámi group from Norway, won the jury award with the song "Mijjajaa". The public award was won by Welsh-Cornish singer Gwenno Saunders with the song "Vodya".

Liet International 2003
Language	Artist	Song	Points	Place
Catalan	Dept.	"Sensacions"	36	8
Cornish	Gwenno	"Vodya"	57	3 ◇
Friulian	Prorastar	"Michi"	22	10
Galician	Anubía	"Nai"	44	5
Irish	Briege Murphy	"An Mhuir"	39	6
Occitan	Nux Vomica	"Barbet pantaï"	56	4
Sorbian	Awful Noise	"Jarobinka"	31	9
Southern Sámi	Transjoik	"Mijjajaa"	70	1
Welsh	Epitaff	"Yr ateb"	66	2
West Frisian	Bacon and Bones	"It allerheechste guod"	39	6

=== 2004 ===
The third edition of the contest was held on 22 October 2004. The venue was once again De Harmonie in Leeuwarden, Netherlands. Sámi singer Niko Valkeapää won both the jury and the public award with the song "Rabas mielain". This was the second time in a row that the contest was won by the Sámi entry.

Liet International 2004
Language	Artist	Song	Points	Place
Breton	EV	[?]	52	5
Friulian	Kosovni Odpadki	"Bye bye bombe"	49	6
Galician	Uxía	"Cadeas"	61	3
Limburgish	Ondiep	[?]	25	10
Northern Sámi	Niko Valkeapää	"Rabas mielain"	91	1 ◇
Occitan	Bombes 2 Bal	"Lo merle"	63	2
Scottish Gaelic	The Alyth McCormack Band	"Dèan cadalan sàmhach"	61	3
Sorbian	Istvan Kobjela	[?]	37	8
Welsh	Elin Fflur	[?]	39	7
West Frisian	Meindert Talma & the Negroes	"Dûnsje wyldekat dûnsje"	32	9

=== 2006 ===
Since Sámi entries had won two out of the three competitions, the fourth edition was held in Östersund, Sweden. Sixty competitors, singing in twenty-five minority languages, took part in the preliminary elimination round. Eleven songs, representing eleven languages, were selected for the final competition.

Although the winner was selected by a jury, the audience could also vote for their favourite entry via text messages and online voting. The Sámi duo Johan Kitti and Ellen Sara Bæhr won the competition with "Luđiin muitalan", sung in Northern Sámi. The public award was won by Liza Pannetier with the Occitan song "Solèu roge".

Liet International 2006
R/O	Language	Artist	Song	Points	Place
1	Friulian	Arbe Garbe	"Oh moj sin"	55	7
2	Scottish Gaelic	Anna Murray and Iain Finlay Macleod	"An-raoir bha mi coiseachd"	46	8
3	Manx	Moot	"Gyn Fockleyn"	38	10
4	Votic	Raud-Ants	"Kui miä kazvolin kanainõ"	41	9
5	Basque	Gari	"Hil ez denak"	30	11
6	Occitan	Liza Pannetier	"Solèu roge"	69	4 ◇
7	West Frisian	Van Wieren	"Nim dyn tiid"	58	6
8	Meänkieli	Jord	"Oonhän meilä vielä kieli"	60	5
9	Galician	Narf	"Santiago"	78	2
10	Northern Sámi	Johan Kitti and Ellen Sara Bæhr	"Luđiin muitalan"	86	1
11	Romani	Karaván Familia	"Shej baxtali"	77	3

=== 2008 ===
Liet-Lávlut 2008, the fifth edition of the contest, took place on 18 October 2008 at Kulturens hus in Luleå, Sweden. Corsican singer Jacques Culioli won both the jury and public award with the song "Hosanna in excelsis".

Liet International 2008
R/O	Language	Artist	Song	Points	Place
1	Galician	Boy Elliott & the Plastic Bags	"Planeta 19"	46	10
2	Meänkieli	Surunmaa	"Tulethan takasi"	51	8
3	Breton	Gwennyn	"Bugale Belfast"	54	6
4	Corsican	Jacques Culioli	"Hosanna in excelsis"	80	1 ◇
5	Arbëresh	Spasulati	"Botë e shurë"	51	8
6	Northern Sámi	Elin Kåven	"Áibbas jaska"	73	2
7	West Frisian	Jelte Posthumus & Pilatus Pas	"De wiete wyn hellet oan"	54	6
8	Friulian	Carnicats	"Oz dream"	56	4
9	Welsh	Yr Annioddefol	"Drysu"	44	11
10	Asturian	Dixebra	"Indios"	73	2
11	Mordovian	Mordens	"Good Will Blessing"	56	4

=== 2009 ===
In January 2009, the board of the Liet Foundation decided to continue under the name Liet International. The sixth edition of the contest was held on 31 October 2009, returning to the De Harmonie theatre in Leeuwarden, Netherlands. The Finnish Sámi rock band SomBy won the competition with the song "Ii iđit vel", sung in Northern Sámi. The public award was won by Dr. Drer & CRC posse from Sardinia, with the song "Apu biu".

Liet International 2009
R/O	Language	Artist	Song	Points	Place
1	Asturian	Alfredo González	"La nada y tu"	40	9
2	Occitan	Zine	"Lo prince charmant"	31	10
3	Sardinian	Dr. Drer & CRC posse	"Apu biu"	80	2 ◇
4	Northern Sámi	SomBy	"Ii iđit vel"	85	1
5	Friulian	Lino Straulino	"Doman"	78	3
6	West Frisian	It Langstme & de Dea	"Wikel"	63	5
7	Irish	Fiach	"Sea Táim"	75	4
8	Low German	De fofftig Penns	"Platt"	48	8
9	Scottish Gaelic	Sunrise not Secular	"Lasair An t-Oidhche"	52	7
10	Karelian	Sattuma	"Marjaini-darjaini"	62	6
11	Latgalian	Sovvaļnīks	"Pats sevī dzeivs"	24	11

=== 2010 ===
In 2010, Liet International was held in the Breton city of Lorient, France. The contest was won by the Faroese band Orka with the song "Rúmdardrongurin". The public award went to the Friulian band R.esistence in Dub with the song "Fieste".

Liet International 2010
R/O	Language	Artist	Song	Points	Place
1	Faroese	Orka	"Rúmdardrongurin"	88	1
2	Galician	Mafia Galega	"Billarda sempre"	29	10
3	Corsican	Stéphane Casalta	"Albasgia"	59	7
4	Vepsian	Jousnen Järved	"Verrez tullei"	45	8
5	Scottish Gaelic	Rachel Walker	"Fada Bhuam"	65	5
6	Asturian	Xera	"Tierra"	78	2
7	Northern Sámi	Pia-Maria Holmgren	"Geaidnu"	44	9
8	West Frisian	Equal Souls	"Do swalkest"	75	3
9	Breton	Dom Duff	"Kan an awen"	23	11
10	Friulian	R.esistence in Dub	"Fieste"	70	4 ◇
11	Irish	The Temporary	"Cupan Toast"	62	6

=== 2011 ===
The eighth Liet International was held on 19 November 2011 at the Teatro Giovanni da Udine in Udine, Italy, the historical capital of the region of Friuli. The West Frisian singer Janna Eijer won the jury award with the song "Ien klap", while the band Coffeeshock Company from Austria won the public vote with "Gusla mi se je znicila", sung in Burgenland Croatian.

Liet International 2011
R/O	Language	Artist	Song	Points	Place
1	Vepsian	Noid	"Kättepajo"	40	9
2	Romansh	Rezia Ladina	"Id ès capità"	55	7
3	Burgenland Croatian	Coffeeshock Company	"Gusla mi se je znicila"	80	3 ◇
4	Friulian	Priska	"Hajra"	28	12
5	Scottish Gaelic	Macanta	"Gaol"	77	4
6	Northern Sámi	Rolffa	"Gulatgo mu?"	32	11
7	Basque	Siroka	"Hi, vascofona!"	70	5
8	Ladin	Cuntra Löm	"La moncignosa"	35	10
9	Asturian	Skama la Rede	"Condenau"	52	8
10	West Frisian	Janna Eijer	"Ien klap"	83	1
11	Udmurt	Silent Woo Goore	"Kyrdźasa leźom ali" (Кырӟаса лэзём али)	81	2
12	Irish	Aoife Scott	"Donal Ná Fág"	63	6

=== 2012 ===
The ninth edition of Liet International was held on 1 December 2012 at the Teatru de la Llaboral in Gijón, Asturias, Spain. Welsh-born Breton singer Lleuwen won the jury award with the song "Ar gouloù bev", while the public award went to Asturiana Mining Company with "Si nun conoces Vaḷḷouta".

Liet International 2012
R/O	Language	Artist	Song	Points	Place
1	Corsican	Dopu Cena	"Trasmetta"	86	2
2	Basque	Enkore	"Muxurik muxu"	41	8
3	Algherese Catalan	Claudia Crabuzza and Claudio Gabriel Sanna	"Ara"	64	5
4	Scottish Gaelic	Brian Ó hEadhra	"Fathainn"	64	5
5	Udmurt	Ivan Belosludtsev & 4 Cheber Pios	"Tau tynyd" (Тау тыныд)	35	9
6	Asturian	Asturiana Mining Company	"Si nun conoces Vaḷḷouta"	66	4 ◇
7	West Frisian	Yldau	"Fjoer"	52	7
8	Friulian	JoNoKognos	"Mai mai"	32	11
9	Breton	Lleuwen	"Ar gouloù bev"	87	1
10	Northern Sámi	Inger Karoline Gaup	"Oainnát go?"	35	9
11	East Frisian Low Saxon	The Voodoolectric	"Slickermuul"	76	3

=== 2014 ===
The tenth Liet International song contest was held on 12 December 2014 in Oldenburg, Lower Saxony, Germany. Italian singer Martina Iori won the jury award with the song "Via con mia mùsega", sung in Ladin. In this year, the audience award was replaced by a musicians' award voted on by the contestants themselves. The musicians' award was won by Aila-duo from Finland with the song "Naharij kandâ", sung in Inari Sámi.

Liet International 2014
R/O	Language	Artist	Song	Points	Place
1	Asturian	Banda de Gaitas El Trasno	"Volviche"	36	7
2	Scottish Gaelic	Willie Campbell	"Fir-chlis"	30	9
3	Minderico	Bandalheira	"Baracho ancho pereira"	21	10
4	Breton	Adnoz	"Un dra nevez"	53	4
5	Sardinian	Forefingers Up!	"Sa luxi 'e su soli"	56	3
6	West Frisian	Bruno Rummler	"Beppe"	51	5
7	Inari Sámi	Aila-duo	"Naharij kandâ"	64	2 ◇
8	Low German	The Paintbox	"Söss söss söss / Dat Slecht"	40	6
9	Ladin	Martina Iori	"Via con mia mùsega"	73	1
10	Mari	Marina Sadova	"Shochmo keche" (Шочмо кече)	36	7

Detailed jury votes
R/O	Song	ast	gla	drc	bre	srd	fry	smn	nds	lld	chm	Total
1	"Volviche"	—	5	6	5	5	5	2	2	1	5	36
2	"Fir-chlis"	1	—	4	8	1	3	7	4	5	4	30
3	"Baracho ancho pereira"	2	3	—	4	6	1	1	1	2	1	21
4	"Un dra nevez"	6	10	3	—	7	4	3	6	8	6	53
5	"Sa luxi 'e su soli"	5	2	7	10	—	6	8	5	10	3	56
6	"Beppe"	7	4	5	7	3	—	5	8	4	8	51
7	"Naharij kandâ"	10	6	8	6	4	10	—	3	7	10	64
8	"Söss söss söss / Dat Slecht"	3	7	1	3	10	2	6	—	6	2	40
9	"Via con mia mùsega"	8	8	10	8	8	7	10	7	—	7	73
10	"Shochmo keche"	4	1	2	2	2	8	4	10	3	—	36
Jury members
ast – José Manuel Tejedor Mier; gla – Alex MacDonald; drc – Tiago Mendes Rodrigues; bre – Maodez Huran; srd – Claudia Aru Carreras; fry – Sjoerd Bootsma; smn – Nils Johan Bars; nds – Stefan Meyer; lld – Marco Stolfo; chm – Eric Yuzykayn

=== 2017 ===
The eleventh Liet International song contest was scheduled to be held in late 2016 in Kautokeino, Norway, the home of the Sámi Grand Prix. However, due to a lack of funds, the contest was postponed to 13 April 2017 and was held as part of the Sámi Easter Festival. For a second time in the history of the contest, a local singer, Ella Marie Hætta Isaksen, won the contest with her song "Luoddaearru" (transl. 'Crossroad'). She also won the musicians' award.

Liet International 2017
R/O	Language	Artist	Song	Points	Place
1	Scottish Gaelic	Mary Ann Kennedy & Friends	"Grioglachan"	21	6
2	Luxembourgish	La Schlapp Sauvage	"Blanne Käpitan"	13	8
3	Bashkir	Zaman	"Hïwïtma" (Һыуытма)	31	4
4	Sranan Tongo	Ruben Semmoh and Romeo Sumter	"Saka na pin"	25	5
5	Breton	Ukan	"Den ebet all"	21	6
6	Udmurt	Pavel Aleksandrov and Dmitry Yakimov	"Van'myz ortche" (Ваньмыз ортче)	38	3
7	West Frisian	Aafke Zuidersma	"Minsk fan wearde"	39	2
8	Northern Sámi	Ella Marie Hætta Isaksen	"Luoddaearru"	44	1 ◇

=== 2018 ===
The twelfth Liet International song contest was held on 23 May 2018 at Poppodium Neushoorn in Leeuwarden, Netherlands, as part of the European Capital of Culture activities. The Rowan Tree won the jury award with the song "Tresor", sung in Cornish. The musicians' award was won by Galician singer Nastasia Zürcher with the song "Espertos".

Liet International 2018
R/O	Language	Artist	Song	Points	Place
1	Sranan Tongo	Afro-Carib Ensemble	"Dansi nanga yu"	75	9
2	Galician	Familia Caamagno	"Lausanne"	61	12
3	Antwerps	Jenne Decleir	"Dans met mij"	73	10
4	Komi	Evgenia Udalova	"Voj" (Вой)	26	14
5	West Frisian	Stonecrobs	"Yn frijheid kinsto libje"	111	5
6	Bashkir	Zaman	"Alga" (Алга)	110	7
7	Scots	Gerda Stevenson and Kyrre Slind	"Aye The Gean"	119	3
8	Scottish Gaelic	Whyte	"Tairm"	71	11
9	Galician	Nastasia Zürcher	"Espertos"	133	2 ◇
10	Aromanian	Pira	"Mash a meu"	49	13
11	Cornish	The Rowan Tree	"Tresor"	141	1
12	West Frisian	Luko Reinders	"Kom rin mei my"	116	4
13	Northern Sámi	Inger Karoline Gaup	"Oahppan lean"	111	5
14	Franco-Provençal	Billy Fumey	"Bondze Heidi"	78	8

Detailed jury votes
R/O	Song	srn	glg	nld	kom	fry	bak	sco	gla	glg	rup	cor	fry	sme	frp	Total
1	"Dansi nanga yu"	—	5	4	4	10	6	2	5	6	6	3	7	12	5	75
2	"Lausanne"	5	—	5	2	5	2	3	4	8	9	4	5	3	6	61
3	"Dans met mij"	2	7	—	7	6	8	7	3	5	3	5	6	2	12	73
4	"Voj"	1	2	1	—	1	1	1	1	7	2	1	4	1	3	26
5	"Yn frijheid kinsto libje"	9	8	8	9	—	3	6	9	11	10	10	10	5	13	111
6	"Alga"	11	3	9	6	12	—	12	6	12	4	6	9	10	10	110
7	"Aye The Gean"	6	9	10	10	11	7	—	11	4	12	7	13	11	8	119
8	"Tairm"	4	11	13	5	4	4	5	—	1	1	11	3	7	2	71
9	"Espertos"	13	12	2	11	9	10	13	13	—	8	12	8	13	9	133
10	"Mash a meu"	3	6	3	1	2	11	4	7	3	—	2	2	4	1	49
11	"Tresor"	10	10	12	13	8	13	11	12	10	13	—	12	6	11	141
12	"Kom rin mei my"	12	4	11	8	13	12	10	8	9	7	9	—	9	4	116
13	"Oahppan lean"	8	1	6	12	7	9	8	10	13	11	8	11	—	7	111
14	"Bondze Heidi"	7	13	7	3	3	5	9	2	2	5	13	1	8	—	78

=== 2020 ===
The thirteenth Liet International contest was due to be held on 3 and 4 April 2020 in Aabenraa, Denmark, but was cancelled due to the COVID-19 pandemic. A full list of participating acts had been released prior to the cancellation. It was decided that a non-competitive, online replacement show, entitled Liet International 2020+1, would be held on 8 October 2021 to celebrate the acts due to compete in the 2020 contest. Ten out of the twenty acts participated in Liet International 2020+1.

Liet International 2020
Language(s)	Artist	Song	2020+1
Alsatian	Isabelle	"Waje de Litt"	—
Asturian	Luis Nuñez & los Folganzanes	"Tengo un sitiu pa ti"	Yes
Bashkir	Zaman	"Aida yanga"	Yes
Burgenland Croatian	Turbokrowodn	"Mila moja"	Yes
Carinthian Slovene	Bališ	"Spal bomo če smo hin"	—
Catalan	Roger Argemí	"La fina línia"	Yes
Cornish	Brother Sea	"Oll 'Vel Onen"	—
Galician	Carolina Rubirosa	"Sozinha"	Yes
Heligoland Frisian	Noctiluca	"Iaan"	—
Low German	Die Tüdelband	"Buten an't Meer"	Yes
Manx	Clash Vooar	"Lhiggeyder Folley"	—
North Schleswig German	63-72	"Mein kleines Lied"	—
Romansh	Fiona Fiasco	"Mona Lisa"	—
Sardinian	Bumbe Orchestra	"Cala Sinzias"	Yes
Scottish Gaelic	Marcas Mac an Tuairneir and Bogha-Frois	"Dumbbells"	—
South Tyrolean German	Jimmi Henndreck	"Nairobi"	—
Southern Sámi	Saara Hermansson	"Mov laavlome"	Yes
Southern Schleswig Danish	Sølo	"Kærestesangen"	—
Tatar	Juna	"Yashel kuzle" (Яшел күзле)	Yes
West Frisian	Sequens	"Do bist frij"	Yes

=== 2022 ===
The thirteenth Liet International contest was held on 13 May 2022 at the Schweizerhalle in Tønder, Denmark. There were 13 competing entries, and the show was hosted by Stefanie Pia Wright and Niklas Freiberg Nissen. It featured the first competitive entries in North Schleswig German, Southern Schleswig Danish, and South Tyrolean German, as well as the first entry in North Frisian since the inaugural contest in 2002. It was the first contest since 2008 to not feature an entry from Scotland, and the first competitive edition to not feature a submission from the United Kingdom.

Initially, the Russian band Juna were due to compete with the song "Takhetle konem" in the Tatar language, but they withdrew due to the 2022 Russian invasion of Ukraine. In their place, Israeli band Sofi and the Baladis competed with the song "Rebutalla", marking the first entry from a country in the Middle East. Early announcements also listed the Cornish band Brother Sea with the song "Trodhydhyek" as a participant, while the final listing contained Billy Fumey with "U Port Titi" instead.

The jury award was won by Corsican singer Doria Ousset with the song "Roma". The audience award was won by Sardinian singer Emanuele Pintus with the song "Genia".

Liet International 2022
R/O	Language	Artist	Song	Points	Place
1	North Schleswig German	Martin Hørløck	"Æ Nordschleswig-Lied"	54	12
2	Franco-Provençal	Billy Fumey	"U Port Titi"	58	11
3	Galician	Carolina Rubirosa	"O teu camiñar"	118	3
4	North Frisian	Martje Johannsen and Christoph Hansen	"Maleen"	45	13
5	Sardinian	Emanuele Pintus	"Genia"	60	10 ◇
6	West Frisian	Adri de Boer	"Bliuw mar by my"	72	8
7	South Tyrolean German	Jimi Henndreck	"Heihupfa"	102	4
8	Northern Sámi	Ingá-Máret Gaup-Juuso	"Dovdameahttumii"	82	6
9	Corsican	Doria	"Roma"	119	1
10	Catalan	Roger Argemí	"La contradicció"	80	7
11	Southern Schleswig Danish	Yourdaughters	"Hudsult"	118	2
12	Samaritan Hebrew	Sofi and the Baladis	"Rebutalla"	85	5
13	Low German	Die Tüdelband	"Wenn ik enen Wunsch harr"	60	9

Detailed jury votes
R/O	Song	deu	frp	glg	frr	srd	fry	bar	sme	cos	cat	dan	smp	nds	Total
1	"Æ Nordschleswig-Lied"	—	3	3	8	1	4	4	4	14	1	3	8	1	54
2	"U Port Titi"	4	—	4	10	9	8	3	5	4	2	4	1	4	58
3	"O teu camiñar"	5	2	—	7	8	12	14	9	12	14	14	12	9	118
4	"Maleen"	6	1	1	—	3	5	1	1	1	10	9	5	2	45
5	"Genia"	1	5	8	9	—	1	6	10	9	3	1	2	5	60
6	"Bliuw mar by my"	9	6	10	5	4	—	5	3	2	9	2	9	8	72
7	"Heihupfa"	8	9	12	14	14	2	—	7	6	8	5	7	10	102
8	"Dovdameahttumii"	3	10	5	6	2	7	10	—	10	7	6	10	6	82
9	"Roma"	14	7	6	3	7	14	9	14	—	5	12	14	14	119
10	"La contradicció"	12	4	7	1	10	9	2	8	8	—	10	6	3	80
11	"Hudsult"	10	12	14	12	12	10	12	6	3	12	—	3	12	118
12	"Rebutalla"	2	14	9	2	6	6	7	12	7	6	7	—	7	85
13	"Wenn ik enen Wunsch harr"	7	8	2	4	5	3	8	2	5	4	8	4	—	60

=== 2024 ===
The fourteenth Liet International contest was held on 22 November 2024 at the Centru Culturale Alb’oru in Bastia, France. Eleven competing entries were chosen out of 30 submissions, including the first competitive entries in Ladino (Judaeo-Spanish), Lower Sorbian, and Valencian. It was the first contest since 2005 where the Sámi Grand Prix is not used as a national final for the contest, and the participant list announcement confirmed that it would be the first contest to not include an entry in any of the Sámi languages. The contest was broadcast live on France 3 Corse as well as online.

Despite initial announcements of the participant list saying that there would be thirteen entries, and then later announcements saying there would be eleven entries, ten entries appeared in the show. Cornish song "Oll an dra" by Annie Baylis, and Aromanian song "Ti un lai dor" by Tumbe were originally announced as participating in the contest before being removed. The Sardinian song "Ita abarrat" by Su Maistu was included in the participant list, before being changed to "No dda infiu" by Luca Marcia. Additionally, the South Tyrolean German entry "Spaziern" by Robin's Haut was not present in the show, despite being announced as a participant.

The jury award was won by Netherlands-based singer Nani Vazana with the song "Una segunda piel", sung in Ladino. The audience award was won by the Corsican group Una Fiara Nova with the song "Qualcosa di tè".

Liet International 2024
R/O	Language	Artist	Song	Points	Place
1	Corsican	Una Fiara Nova	"Qualcosa di tè"	63	5 ◇
2	North Schleswig German	Sihav	"Doppelgänger"	24	10
3	Breton	Brieg Guerveno	"Piv vin"	68	4
4	Lower Sorbian	Duo LeDazzo	"Co by nadejšła"	56	7
5	West Frisian	Melissa Pander	"Foarby"	72	2
6	Ladino	Nani Vazana	"Una segunda piel"	88	1
7	Valencian	Joan Peiró Aznar	"Migdiada"	63	5
8	Occitan	Séverine Bonnin	"Catarsis"	69	3
9	Sardinian	Luca Marcia	"No dda infiu	50	8
10	Low German	Rockwark	"Ik mok dat op Platt"	47	9

Detailed jury votes
R/O	Song	nds	srd	oci	cat	lad	fry	dsb	bre	deu	cos	Total
1	"Qualcosa di tè"	7	6	7	9	5	7	9	4	9	—	63
2	"Doppelgänger"	4	4	2	2	3	2	2	3	—	2	24
3	"Piv vin"	6	7	13	5	11	4	6	—	7	9	68
4	"Co by nadejšła"	9	2	4	4	13	3	—	11	5	5	56
5	"Foarby"	13	9	3	6	9	—	13	2	11	6	72
6	"Una segunda piel"	11	11	11	11	—	11	7	9	4	13	88
7	"Migdiada"	3	13	9	—	2	6	11	5	3	11	63
8	"Catarsis"	5	5	—	3	6	13	4	13	13	7	69
9	"No dda infiu"	2	—	6	13	4	9	3	7	2	4	50
10	"Ik mok dat op Platt"	—	3	5	7	7	5	5	6	6	3	47
Jury members
nds – Hilka Jeworrek; srd – Claudia Crabuzza; oci – Liza Pannetier; cat – Alba Gomez; lad – Vanessa Paloma Elbaz; fry – Wim Brons; dsb – Andreas Spittank; bre – Youenn Roue; deu – Uffe Iwersen; cos – Patrizia Poli

== Regional selections ==
The majority of Liet International contestants are chosen from applying artists by a selection committee. In addition, entries may be selected through regional song contests. Regional song contests that have served as a preselection for Liet International include:

- Liet (West Frisian; 2002–present)
- Sámi Grand Prix (Sámi languages; 2006–2022)
- Nòs Ùr (Celtic languages and Scots; 2008–2009)
- A polo ghit (Galician; 2008)
- Laulun Laulut (minority languages of the Nordics and Eastern Europe; 2008)
- Premiu al Meyor Cantar (Asturian; 2009–2014)
- Suns (minority languages of the Alps and Mediterranean; 2009–2014)
- Romansh Song Contest (Romansh; 2011)
- Liet Corsica (Corsican; 2012)

== See also ==
- Regio Songfestival
