= Niko Valkeapää =

Finnish Sami musician (born 1968)

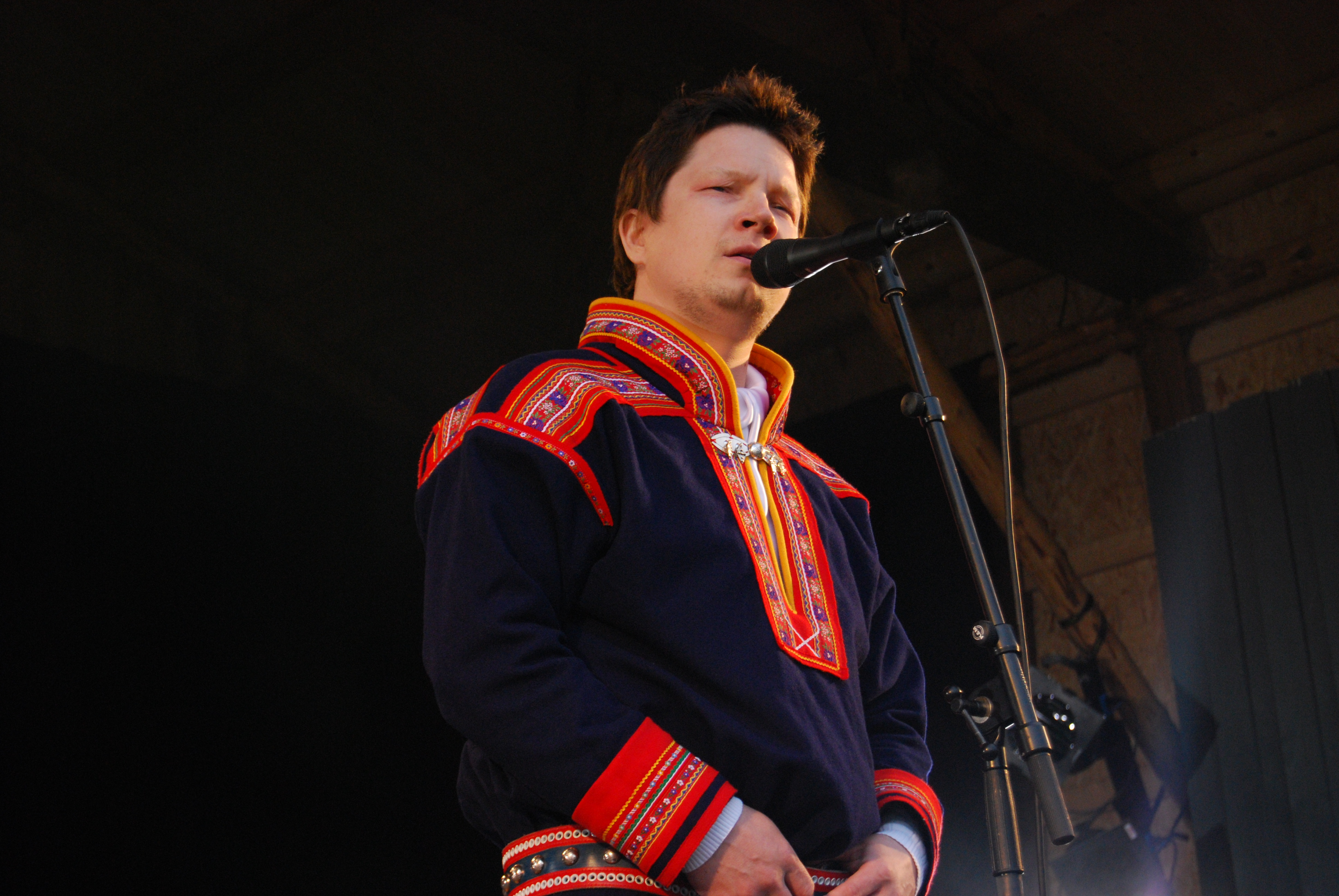
- Valkeapää performing in Márkomeannu, Norway, on 28 July 2008.

Background information
- Born: Niko-Mihkal Valkeapää; 30 December 1968 (age 57); Enontekiö, Finland
- Origin: Sami
- Genres: Yoik, traditional, folk music
- Occupations: Teacher, musician, writer, artist, politician and actor
- Instrument: Vocals
- Label: Duippidit
- Website: www.nikovalkeapaa.no

Niko-Mihkal Valkeapää (born 30 December 1968) is a Finnish Sami musician, joiker (Sami folk singer), teacher, actor and politician.

== Biography ==
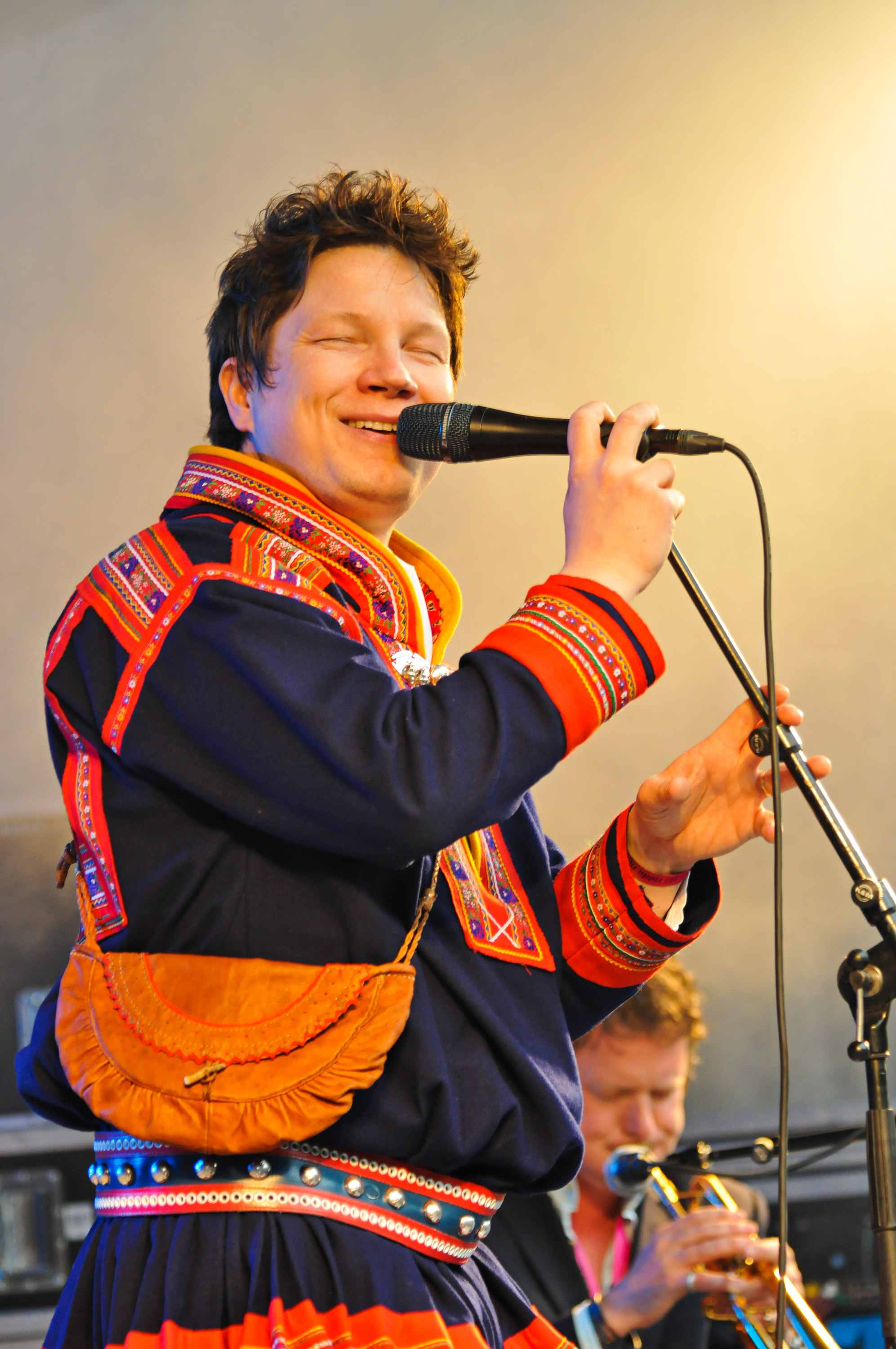
Niko Valkeapää at Riddu Riđđu in 2009.

Born in Enontekiö, Finland, he has been described as "one of Sami music's foremost performers." Valkeapää has been living in Kautokeino Municipality, Norway since 1990. He is godson of Sami artist and joiker Nils-Aslak Valkeapää.

He won the Sámi Grand Prix (1994, 1995), received the Spellemann award in 2003 (open class) with his debut album, and the Liet Ynternasjonaal award, the international music prize for minority music. He has toured across Norway, including the Nattjazz festival in Bergen, and the Northern Norway music festival Riddu Riđđu in Manndalen, Norway. His work has been considered part of the "third wave" of modern Sami music culture.

== Awards ==
In 2005, Valkeapää received the Áillohaš Music Award, a Sámi music award conferred by Kautokeino Municipality and the Kautokeino Sámi Association to honor the recipient's significant contributions to the diverse world of Sámi music.

== Discography ==
- Niko Valkeapää, Duippidit, 2003
- Sierra, Duippidit, 2004
- Birrat birra, Duippidit, 2008
- Gusto, Duippidit, 2012
- ÄÄ, Duippidit, 2012
- Ráfi - Tranquility, Duippidit, 2015
- Gáldu - Source, Duippidit, 2019

== Also appears on ==
- Beginner's Guide to Scandinavia, 3CD-set, Nascente 2011

Awards
Preceded by Sidsel Endresen & Bugge Wesseltoft	Recipient of the Open class Spellemannprisen; 2003	Succeeded by Frode Fjellheim
Preceded by Anders P. Bongo	Recipient of the Áillohaš Music Award; 2005	Succeeded by Dimitri Joavku
