= Anja Storelv =

- Birth name: Anja Vesterheim
- Born: 18 February 1979 (age 46); Skånland, Norway
- Genres: pop, yoik
- Occupations: musician, yoiker, and preschool teacher
- Instruments: voice
- Years active: 1996–present
- Member of: Anja Storelv Band
- Formerly of: Skáddjil

Anja Kathrin Storelv (néé Vesterheim; born 18 February 1979) is a Sámi musician, singer, and preschool teacher. She has won the best song category of the Sámi Grand Prix twice, first in 1998 and then in 1999.

== Early years and education ==
Anja Kathrin Vesterheim was born on 18 February 1979 in Skånland Municipality, Norway. She grow up in Reinåsen in Trøsemark. When she was 8, she started singing in the children's choir at Skånland Church. She continued singing in the youth choir, as well. In addition to being involved in music, she actively competed in various sports such as cycling and cross-country skiing. After school, Vesterheim moved to Tromsø to study to become a teacher at Tromsø University College.

The year 2002 turned out to be a busy one for Vesterheim. For example, she graduated which from Tromsø University College as a preschool teacher, kicked off the Karasjok Easter Festival, and entertained the crowds at that year's Márkomeannu music festival. In addition, she moved from Norway to the town of Råneå in Sweden.

== Career ==
In 1996, when she was 17, she participated in that year's Sámi Grand Prix for the first time. She sang the song Vievdan. Issát Sámmol Hætta of Máze wrote the lyrics for the song and Turid Vesterheim adapted them to the dialect of Northern Sámi spoken in the Ofoten region. The music for the song was composed by Rune Hovdan. Vesterheim placed sixth in the competition.

A few years later, she took part in the Sámi Grand Prix again. This time she won the best song category with Guorus Váibmu. She both wrote and composed the song herself. After her victory, she was invited to yoik for Mikhail Gorbachev when he was visiting Norway. At Harstad/Narvik Airport, she yoiked for Gorbachev, his wife Raisa, and the professors accompanying them from the Gorbachev Foundation.

In 1999, she once again competed in the Sámi Grand Prix, this time with a pop song called Boares muitu. The song's lyrics were written by Idar and Kenneth Reinås. She went on to win the best song category at this year's competition too. After winning, she was invited to sing at the opening of the new Saami Parliament building on 2 November 2000.

In 2015, she took part for the fourth time in the Sámi Grand Prix competition, this time with her new surname Storelv. She sang the song Liegga sallas, which had been written and composed for her by Bernt Mikkel Haglund. Storelv did not place in the top 3.

Over the years, she has actively toured Sápmi with her bands, performing at many large events such as Márkomeannu and the Karasjok Easter Festival. In addition, she has given concerts over the years in other large cities with a sizeable Sámi population.

== Discography ==
Storelv has published two studio albums:Viervái in 2012 and Niegadit in 2015.

=== Studio albums ===
- 2012 – Viervái
- 2015 – Niegadit

=== Compilation albums ===
- 2016 – Sámi Grand Prix 2014 & 2015, with the song Liegga salla
