= Liet =

Liet may refer to

- Liet-Kynes, planetologist of Arrakis in the Dune universe
- Liet-Lavlut, Pan-European Song Contest for Minority Languages
- Liet Unlimited, Clothing production and design.
