= Sofia Jannok =

Musical artist

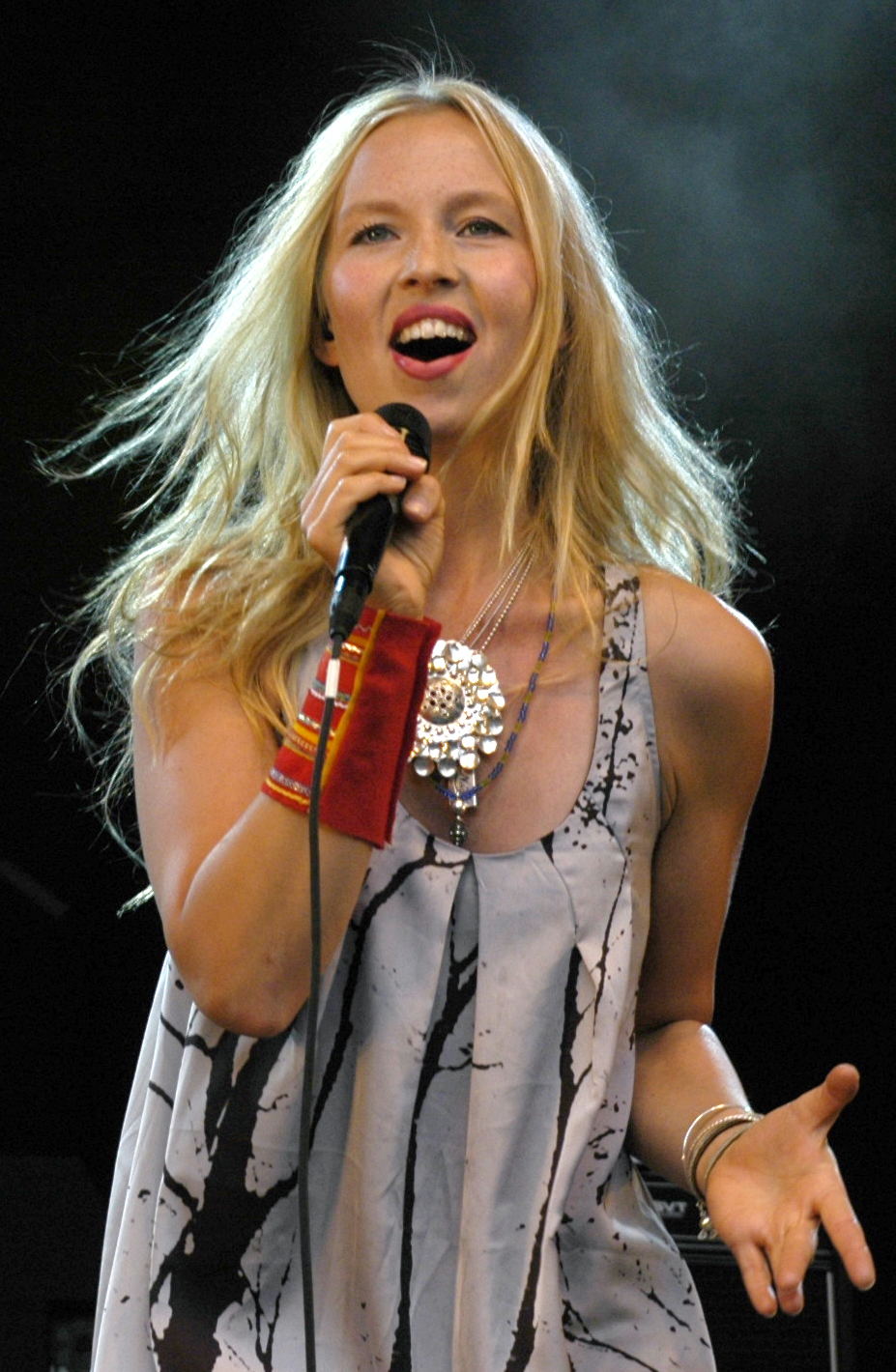
- Sofia Jannok in 2010

Background information
- Born: Sofia Jannok; 15 September 1982 (age 43)
- Genres: Sámi yoiking
- Occupations: Singer songwriter performer
- Instruments: vocals yoiking drums
- Website: www.sofiajannok.com

Brita Maret Sofia Jannok (born 15 September 1982) is a Swedish Sámi artist, singer, songwriter and radio host. Several times, she has publicly taken a stance in social media against the establishment of mines on land used by Sámi reindeer herders. Together with Mariela Idivuoma, she was hostess of the Liet-Lávlut music festival in 2006. She has also hosted the program "Mailbmi – small people great music" on Swedish Radio P2, and the Sámi children's program Unna Junná for Yle. Her music is inspired from diverse musical influences, like folk, pop, jazz and yoik. She sings mostly in Northern Sámi, but also sings and writes lyrics in Swedish and English as well.

== Career ==
Sofia previously performed with Anna Kärrstedt in the duo Sofia och Anna. She performed in Melodifestivalen 2009 with the song "Waterloo" in Sámi ('Čáhcceloo'). On 30 June 2009 she was one of the summer guest hosts on Swedish Radio P1. The day after, 1 July, she participated in SVT's program from Skansen in Stockholm for the inauguration of the Swedish Presidency of the EU. At the opening meeting in the Parliament House in Stockholm on 15 September 2009, she performed "Samelands vidder".

From 23 to 30 May 2010 Jannok performed in various bars and clubs in Shanghai and Beijing, China. From 4 to 5 June 2010 she attended the Talvatis Festival in Cardiff, Wales.

During an inauguration of the Culture year in Umeå 2014, Sofia conducted a call of anti-racism with Cleo and Kristin Amparo before the performance of the song "Faller en, faller alla". On stage at the same time was also a group of left-wing anti-fascist activists wearing ski masks with the message "Free Joel" printed on their shirts, which alludes to an activist who was arrested and convicted for attempted manslaughter and rioting because of the riots in Kärrtorp, when a group of Neo-Nazis attacked a left-wing anti-racism demonstration.

Sofia performed at the first Sápmi Pride festival which took place in Kiruna in 2014 and was attended by 300 people.

== Awards ==
In 2014, Jannok received the Áillohaš Music Award, a Sámi music award conferred by Kautokeino Municipality and the Kautokeino Sámi Association to honor the significant contributions the recipient or recipients has made to the diverse world of Sámi music.

The same year she was nominated for a Grammis award for "Áhpi" ('Wide as Oceans').

In 2021, Jannok was awarded an honorary doctorate from the Luleå University of Technology "for her work for the rights of indigenous people, against discrimination and racism, and for the Arctic environment."

== Discography ==
=== Albums ===
Year	Album	Peak positions
Year	Album	SWE
2007	White / Čeaskat	–
2008	By the Embers / Áššogáttis	16
2013	Áhpi (Wide as Oceans)	27
2016	ORDA – This is my land	
2021	LÁVV U	

=== Other appearances ===
- 2000: Dál juovlla čuovggaid cahkkehit (Sami Christmas CD)
- 2007: Ima ipmašat (children's CD, DAT)
- 2007: Buoremus ájgge (children's CD, Mandy Senger & Sara Aira Fjällström)

Soundtracks

- 2000: *TV-musik ur dokumentärserien Samerna (Scandinavian Songs)
- 2000: Great North (soundtrack, TVA International inc.)

=== Singles ===
- 2000: "Čalmmit" (as part of Sofia och Anna)
- 2004: "Liekkas clubmix" (promotional single, Publishment)

=== Music competitions ===
- 2001: Sámi Grand Prix 2001, Rieban
- 2003: Sámi Grand Prix 2003, Rieban

== In popular culture ==
Episode 5: Just Decide of Threshold Podcast Season Two featured the song "We are Still Here" from Jannok's album ORDA – This is My Land.

Awards
Preceded by Magnus Vuolab	Recipient of the Áillohaš Music Award; 2014	Succeeded by Jussi Isokoski
