= Unna Junná =

- Genre: Children’s
- Presented by: Sofia Jannok; Niillas Holmberg
- Country of origin: Finland
- Original languages: Northern Sámi, Inari Sámi, Skolt Sámi
- No. of seasons: 13
- No. of episodes: 331

Original release
- Network: Yle; SVT
- Release: September 2007

Unna Junná is a children's television program produced by Finnish public broadcaster Yle Sámi Radio several different Sámi languages. It was the first Sámi-language children's program on Finnish TV and it now airs in Northern, Inari, and Skolt Sámi languages. Since 2007, Unna Junná has aired on Yle and SVT television channels in Finland and Sweden respectively.

== Program details ==
Each year, Yle produces thirty 15-minute episodes, half of which air in the spring and half in the fall. The show is hosted by Sámi performers Sofia Jannok and Niillas Holmberg and features songs, stories, and pictures using both live action and animated segments. Unna Junná traditionally airs on Sunday mornings on Yle TV2 with reruns on Yle Teema & Fem and on-demand via the Yle Areena streaming service.

== History ==
After years of advocacy and false starts, Yle added Unna Junná to its programming schedule in September 2007. The program was initially co-produced by Yle Sámi Radio and SVT-Sápmi, but since 2011 it has been produced solely by Yle after SVT decided to focus on its own Sámi children's programming.

== Impact ==
Unna Junná is credited with sparking an interest in Sámi languages among children, playing an important role in the revival of endangered Sámi languages. In 2010, it won the main prize for children's programming at the Finno-Ugric Peoples' Film Festival in the Republic of Komi.
