= Suns Europe =

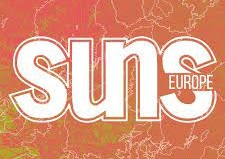
- Suns Europe 2021 logo
- Date: every year since 2015 (11 years ago)
- Location: Udine, Friuli, Italy
- Theme: Minority languages
- Website: www.sunseurope.com

Suns Europe is a music festival and performing arts event celebrating minority language culture, held annually in the Friulian city of Udine. The festival was established in 2015 as a continuation of the regional music contest Suns and is organised by the Cooperativa Informazione Friulana, with support from the Agjenzie Regjonâl pe Lenghe Furlane (ARLeF), the Friuli-Venezia Giulia region, and the municipality of Udine.

== History ==
Suns was first organised in 2009 as a music contest in Udine, except for the 2011 and 2013 editions which took place in Moena, in the Fassa Valley, and in Falera, in the Swiss canton of Graubünden, respectively. The contest selected two winners who qualified to participate in the Liet International festival.

In 2015 the music contest evolved into a festival for groups singing in minority languages across Europe and was renamed Suns Europe. It is open to all minority language communities in Europe as defined by Article 1 of the European Charter for Regional or Minority Languages and follows the same format as Liet International.

The 2024 edition took place at the Teatro Nuovo Giovanni da Udine on 19 October, featuring nine territories, and the Catalan group Remei de Ca la Fresca won the jury prize.

== Winners ==
Year	Date	Participants	Territory	Artist	Song	Language	Ref.
2024	19 October	9	Catalan Countries	Remei de Ca la Fresca	«Aiguaneu» / «La insurrecció que ve»	Catalan	
2023	14 October	6	Faroe Islands	Dania O. Tausen		Faroese	
2022	26 November	6	Wales	HMS Morris		Welsh	
2019	30 November	10	Catalan Countries	Magalí Sare	«Amb els ulls tancats»	Catalan	
2018	1 December	9	Catalan Countries	Jansky	«Ésser elèctric»	Catalan	
2017	2 December	8	Graubünden	Tumasch è	«Jeu sai buc»	Romansh	
2016	3 December	10	Faroe Islands	Steso	«Bruni»	Faroese	
2015	11 December	10	Switzerland	Me+Marie	«Hay eu less»	Romansh	
