= Niels Ovllá Oskal Dunfjell =

Norwegian singer and songwriter (born 1992)

OSCAAL
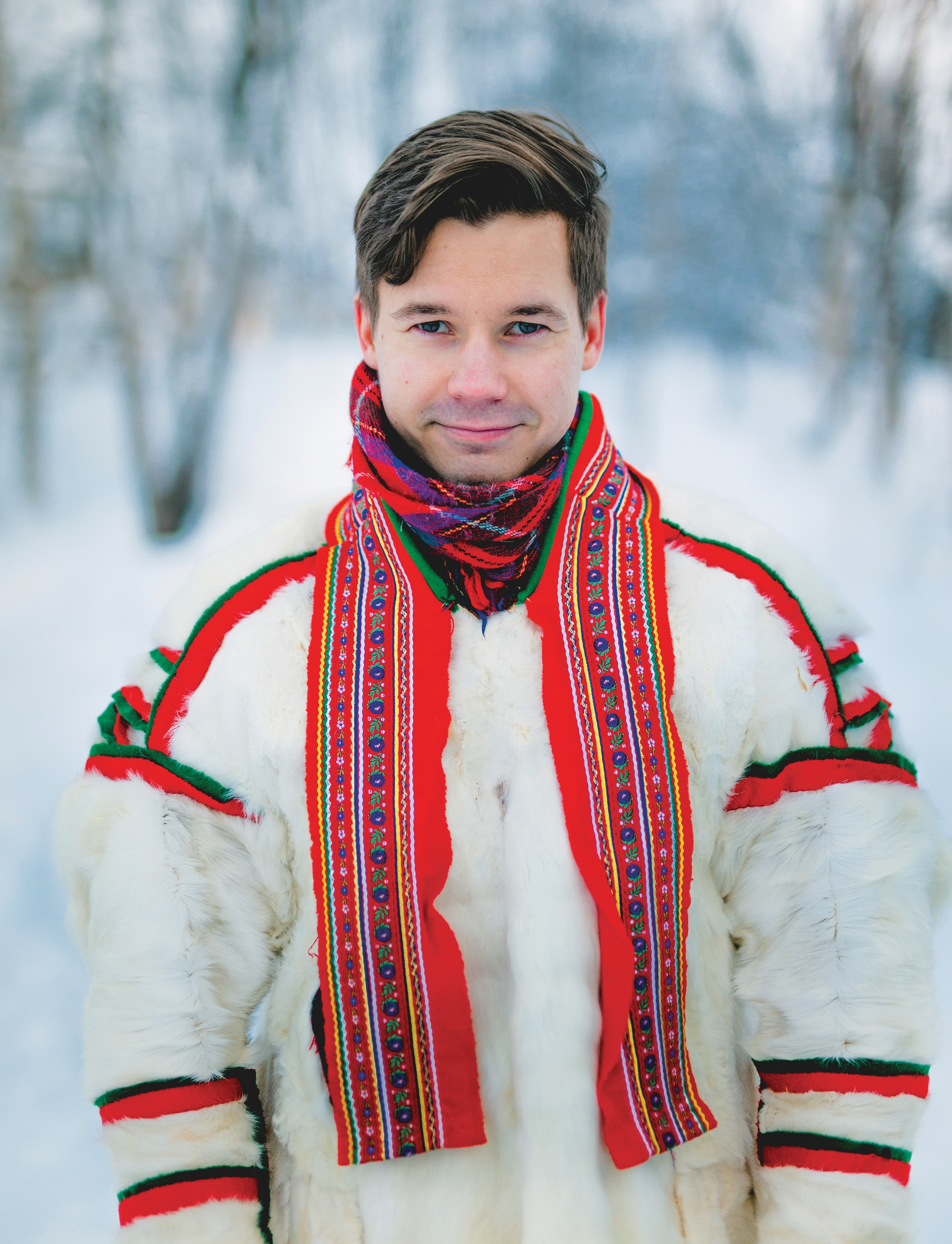

Background information
- Born: Niels Ovllá Oskal Dunfjell; 26 February 1992 (age 34); Tromsø, Norway
- Occupations: Singer; songwriter; photographer; journalist
- Instrument: Vocals

Niels Ovllá Oskal Dunfjell (born 26 February 1992), known professionally as OSCAAL, is a Norwegian-Sámi singer, songwriter, photographer and journalist from Kautokeino, Finnmark.

OSCAAL won the yoik class of the 2025 Sámi Grand Prix with "Sávrrimus". This was the first time he had performed on stage as a solo artist. While he did not receive the most points from the professional jury, he received 42 points from the televote, which resulted in him winning the yoik class of the competition.

OSCAAL was a songwriter in the 2021 Sámi Grand Prix for song finalist Ingá Máiiá Blind. In 2009, he performed a drum number during the intermission of the Sámi Grand Prix with the Sámi actor Gard Emil Elvenes. The duo also participated in the third season of Norske Talenter in 2010 where they made it all the way to the live broadcasts and placed amongst the top 40.

Between 2012–2025, Dunfjell was the editor-in-chief of the Sami youth magazine Š.
