= Sápmi Pride =

Pride festival with Sápmi focus in Europe

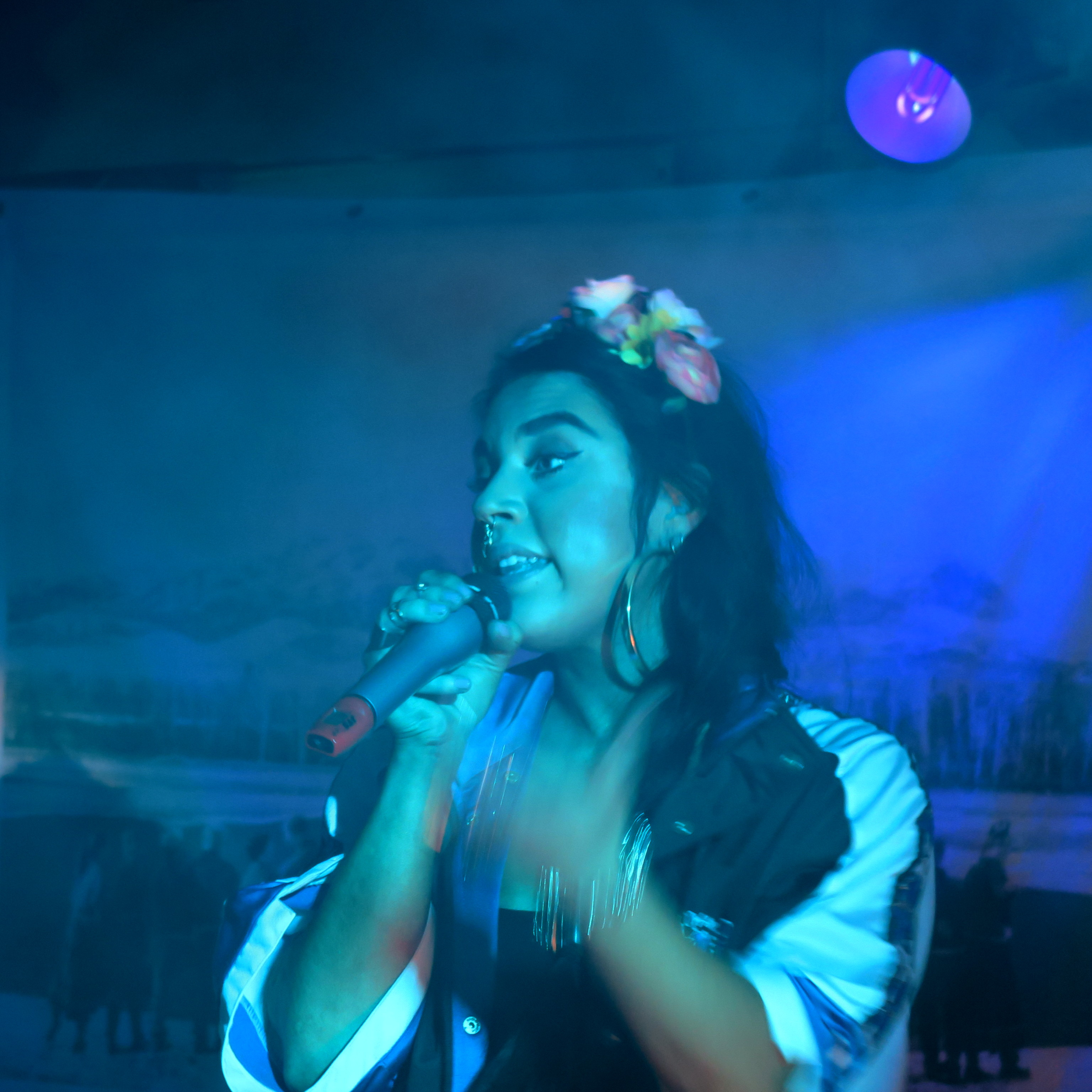
Maxida Märak performing at Sápmi Pride in Karasjok in 2015

Sápmi Pride (Inari Sami: Säämi Pride; Northern Sami: Sápmi Pride; Southern Sami: Saepmie Pride) is a pride festival with Sápmi focus arranged annually since 2014.

== History ==
The festival, organised by Queering Sápmi, took place for the first time in 2014 in Kiruna, in Swedish Lapland. The festival, which went on for four days, featured a performance by Sápmi singer Sofia Jannok, and a parade of 300 participants which traveled through the central city. The following year, the festival took place in Karasjok Municipality in Northern Norway. Maxida Märak performed at the festival and there were workshops with Asta Balto and Erland Elias.

The fourth Sápmi pride took place in Inari in Finland in 2017, the first time the event had been held in Finnish Sápmi. The theme of the festival was generations and solidarity, and it featured discussions with journalist Martta Alajärvi, drama director Pauliina Feodoroff. In 2018, Sápmi Pride took place in Östersund in Sweden.

== Events ==
Year	Location	Sami names	Sami languages
2014	Kiruna	Giron	Northern
2015	Karasjok	Kárášjohka	Northern
2016	Kautokeino	Guovdageaidnu	Northern
2017	Inari	Aanaar/Aanar/Anár	Inari/Skolt/Northern
2018	Östersund	Staare	Southern
2019	Trondheim	Tråante	Southern
2021	Utsjoki	Ohcejohka/Uccjuuhâ/Uccjokk	Northern/Inari/Skolt
2022	Jokkmokk	Jåhkåmåhkke/Johkamohkki	Lule/Northern
2023	Hetta	Heahttá	Northern
2024	Bodø	Bådåddjo/Buvvda/Budejju	Lule/Pite/Northern
