= Remei de Ca la Fresca =

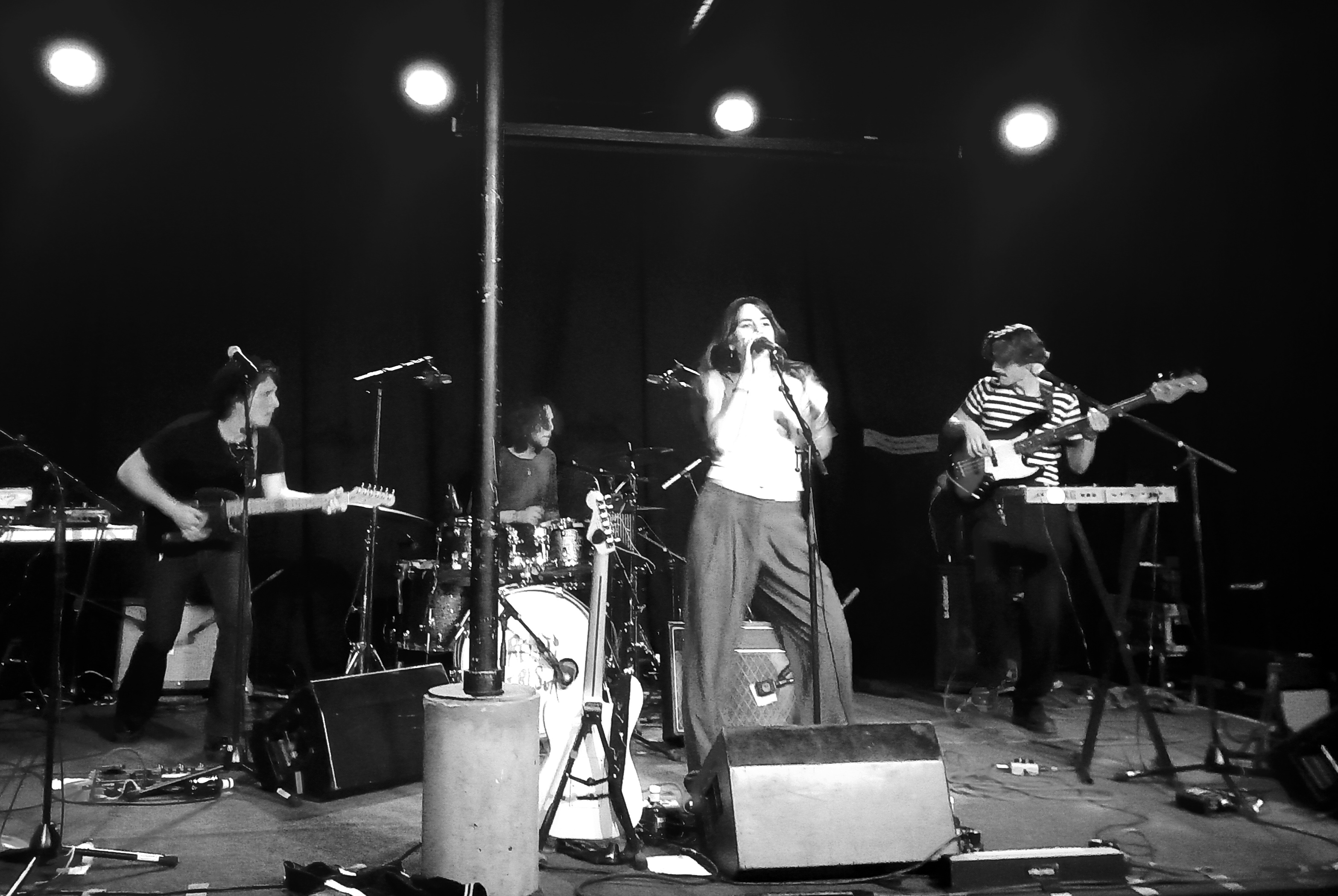
- Remei de Ca la Fresca

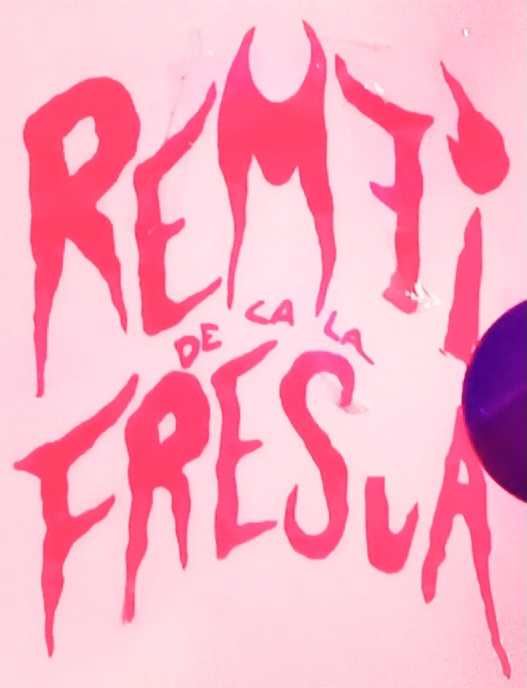
Remei de Ca la Fresca performing live

Remei de Ca la Fresca is a Catalan rock music band known for its visceral rock, often incorporating recitation or declamation, and celebrating folklore and low-fidelity electronic village music, «with a fierce, sharp, and poetic discourse that challenges all stylistic boundaries and shoots both the dead and their watchers». Band members often rotate instruments during live performances.

== Career ==
Throughout 2023, Remei de Ca la Fresca covered «Born slippy» by Underworld under the title «Nascut descarat» and «Paper planes» by M.I.A. as «Tot el que volem és okupar-te el xalet». They also adapted the poem by Palestinian activist Rafeef Ziadah titled «Tots els tons de la ràbia». In May 2024, Remei de Ca la Fresca released the single «Mal de muntanya» as the first preview of their second studio album, L'ham de la pregunta, produced by Ildefons Alonso, drummer of bands such as El Pont d'Arcalís and El Petit de Cal Eril, and released by Bankrobber in autumn 2024.

Finalists of the emerging bands contest Sona9 in 2021, the band won the jury prize at the Friulian competition Suns Europe in 2024, praised for «their powerful voice and overflowing energy, and the interesting combination of sounds and musical structure. For having created something innovative, blending different genres and musical influences».

== Members ==
- Artur Piera – bass, guitar, keyboard and drums
- Xantal Rodríguez – vocals, guitar, drums and castanets
- Víctor Inskipp – drums and bass
- Iago Rueda – guitar and bass

== Discography ==
- Remei de Ca la Fresca (The Indian Runners, 2021)
- L'ham de la pregunta (Bankrobber, 2024)

== Awards ==
- Cerverí Prize for Best Song Lyrics (Girona Literary Awards). Nominated (pending resolution)
