= Sofia och Anna =

Swedish-Saami singing duo

Sofia och Anna (Sofia and Anna) were a Swedish duo composed of Sofia Jannok and Anna Kärrstedt, both from Gällivare, who sang in Northern Sámi. Their group participated in the talent show Juniorchansen on Sweden’s TV3. In 1995, they sang in the final of the Italian Bravo Bravissimo. In 2001, they won first prize in the Sámi Grand Prix with the song Meahcci mánná (Child of the Forest).

== Discography ==
- Čalmmit (Eyes), a single released by the record company DAT O.S with the tracks Du Čalmmit (Your eyes) and Rievssat (Willow grouse), 2000
