= Raud-Ants =

Estonian musical group

- Origin: Viljandi, Estonia
- Genres: Folk metal
- Years active: 2002-present
- Members: Eva Tolsa; Marion Selgall; Tarvi Martens; Madis Arukask; Marju Varblane; Arno Looga; Andres Linnupuu
- Website: Raud-Ants

Raud-Ants is an Estonian folk metal band from Viljandi that was formed in 2002. Raud-Ants combines Estonian folk music with Heavy metal. The band was raised in Tartu and Tallinn.

In 2006 the group participated in the annual minority language music festival Liet-Lavlut with the song "Kui miä kazvolin kanainõ", which was performed in the almost extinct language Votic.

== Members ==
- Eva Tolsa – vocals
- Marion Selgall – vocals
- Tarvi Martens – kantele
- Madis Arukask – guitar
- Marju Varblane – jouhikko, violin
- Arno Looga – bass
- Andres Linnupuu – drums

== Discography ==
Albums

- 2005: Karjasepõli

Demos

- 2002: Antsu Loomine
