= Sámi Grand Prix =

Annual Sámi song and yoik contest

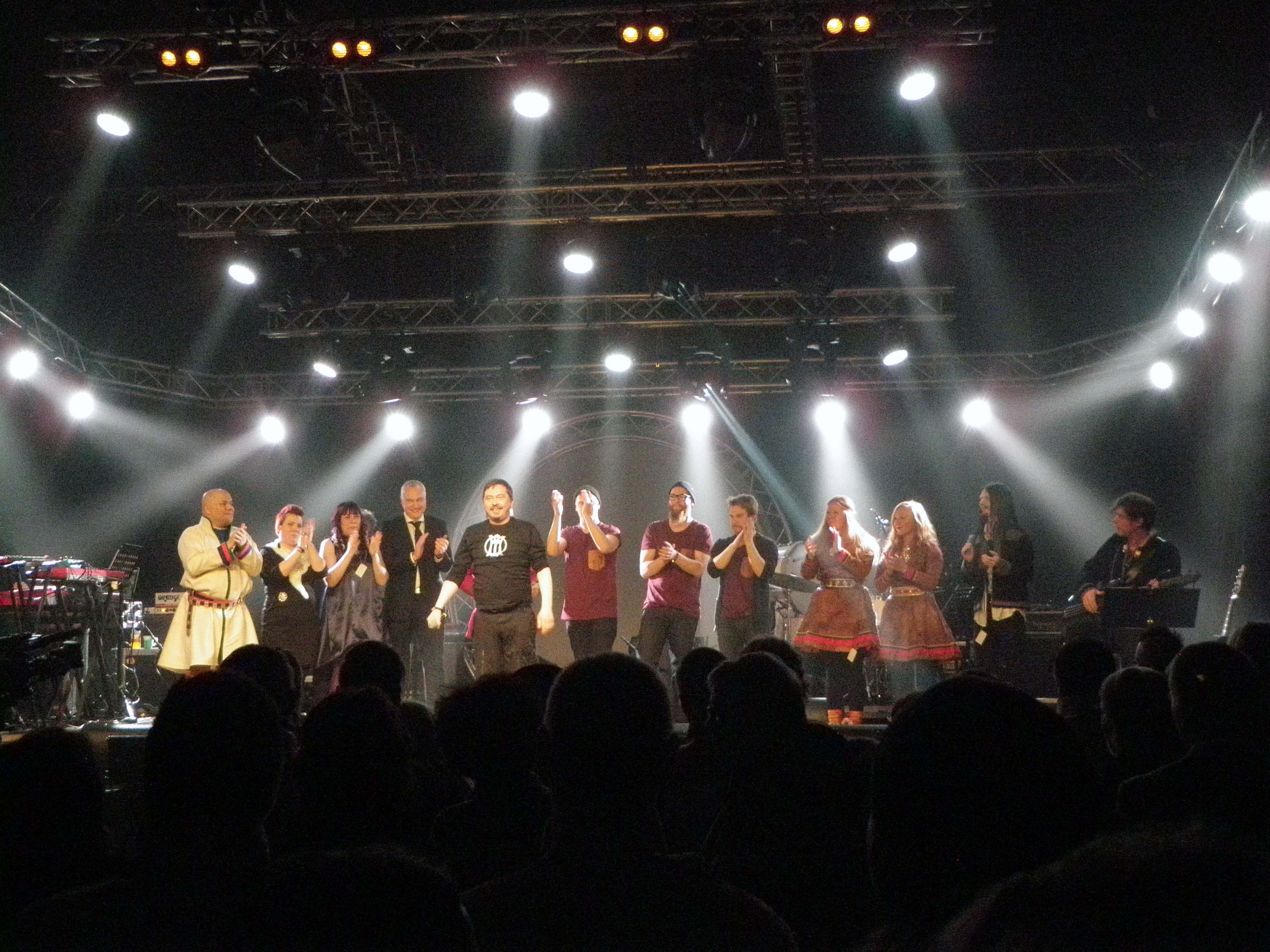
Nils Henrik Buljo, the winner of the song part of the Sámi Grand Prix in 2015, is fifth from the left.

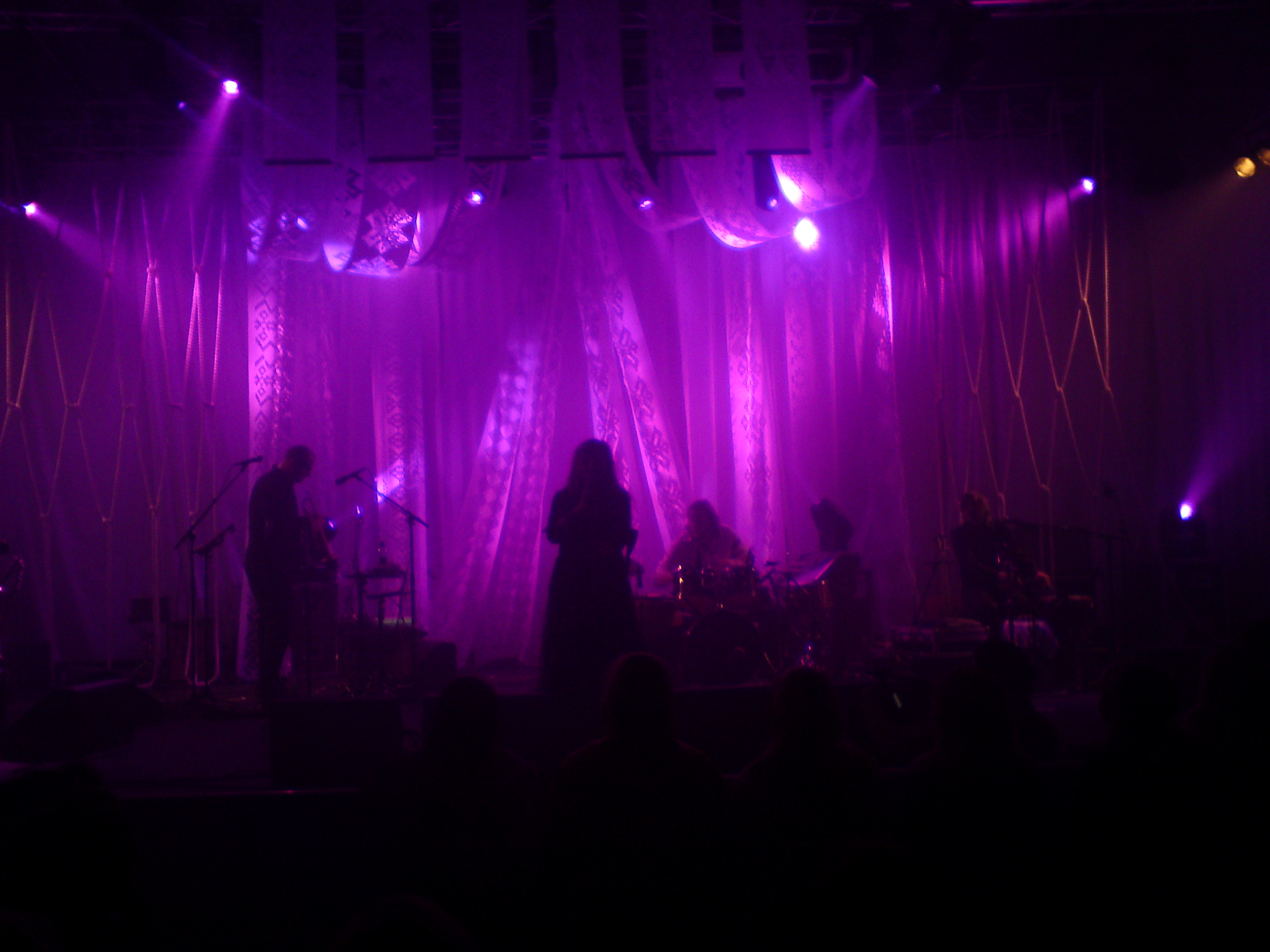
A performance at the 2010 Sámi Grand Prix

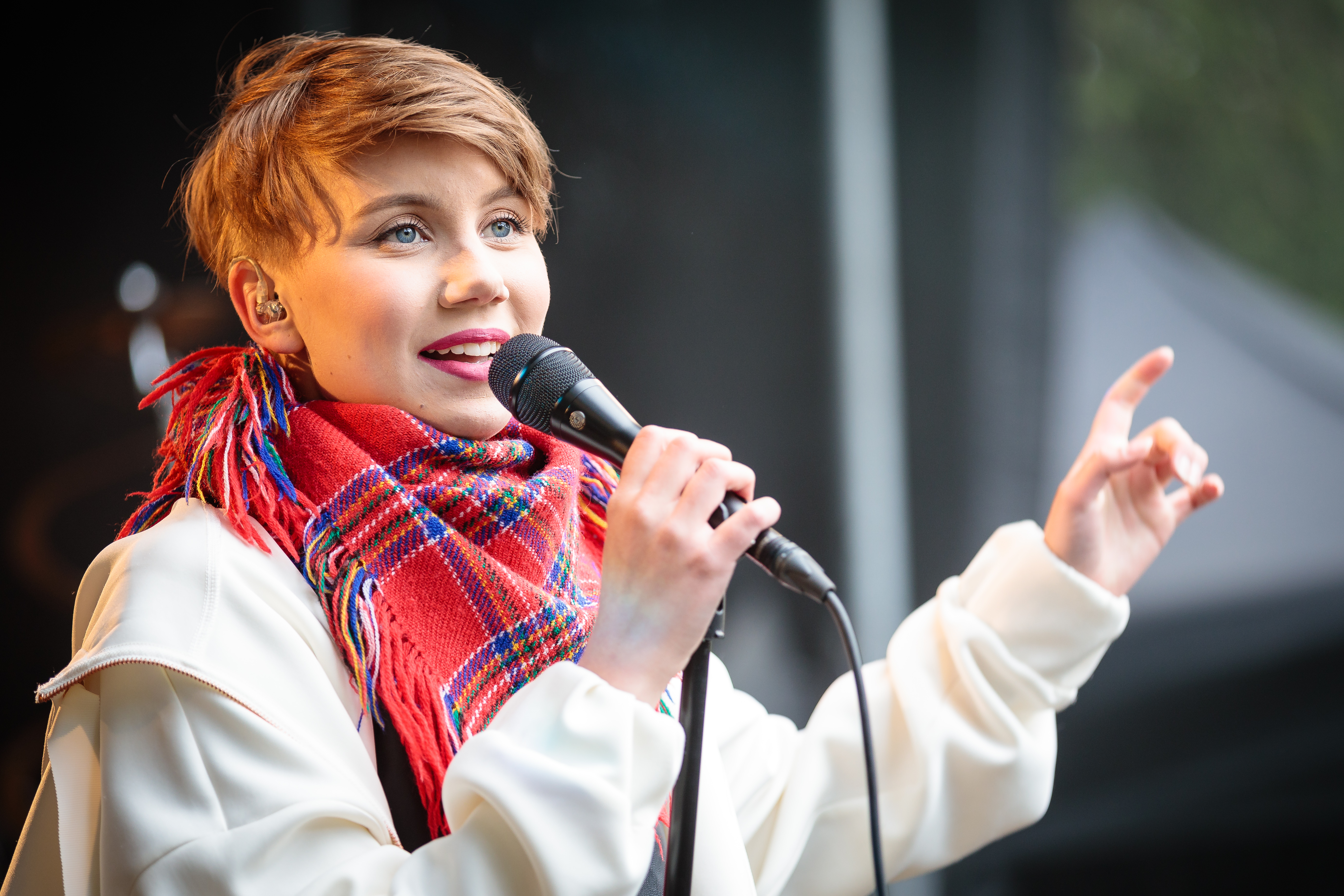
Ella Marie Hætta Isaksen in 2018. She won the song category in the Sámi Grand Prix in 2016 and Liet International in 2017.

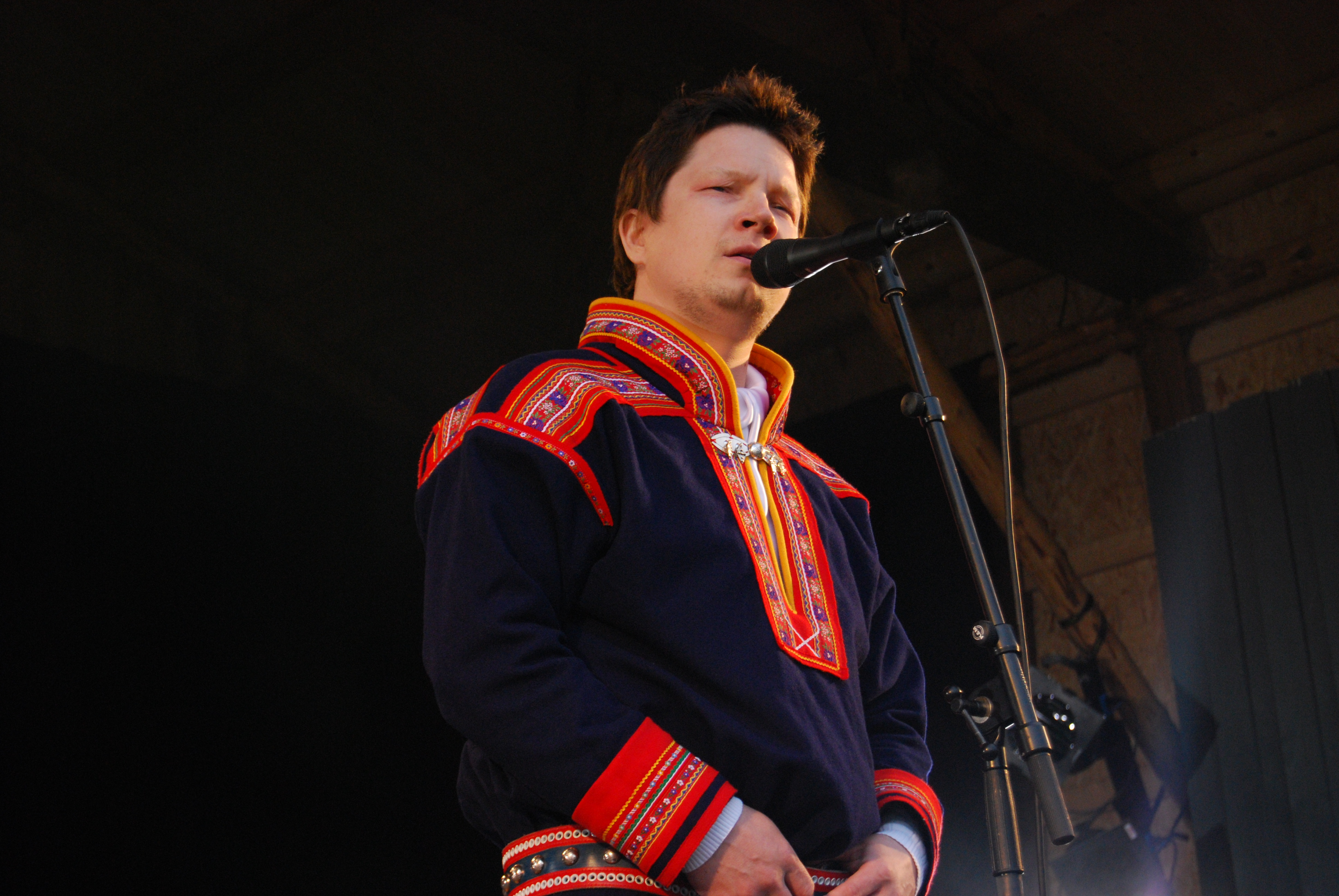
Niko Valkeapää in 2008. In 1994, he won the song category of the Sámi Grand Prix together with Inger Marie Gaino Nilut. The following year he won it again, this time as a solo act.

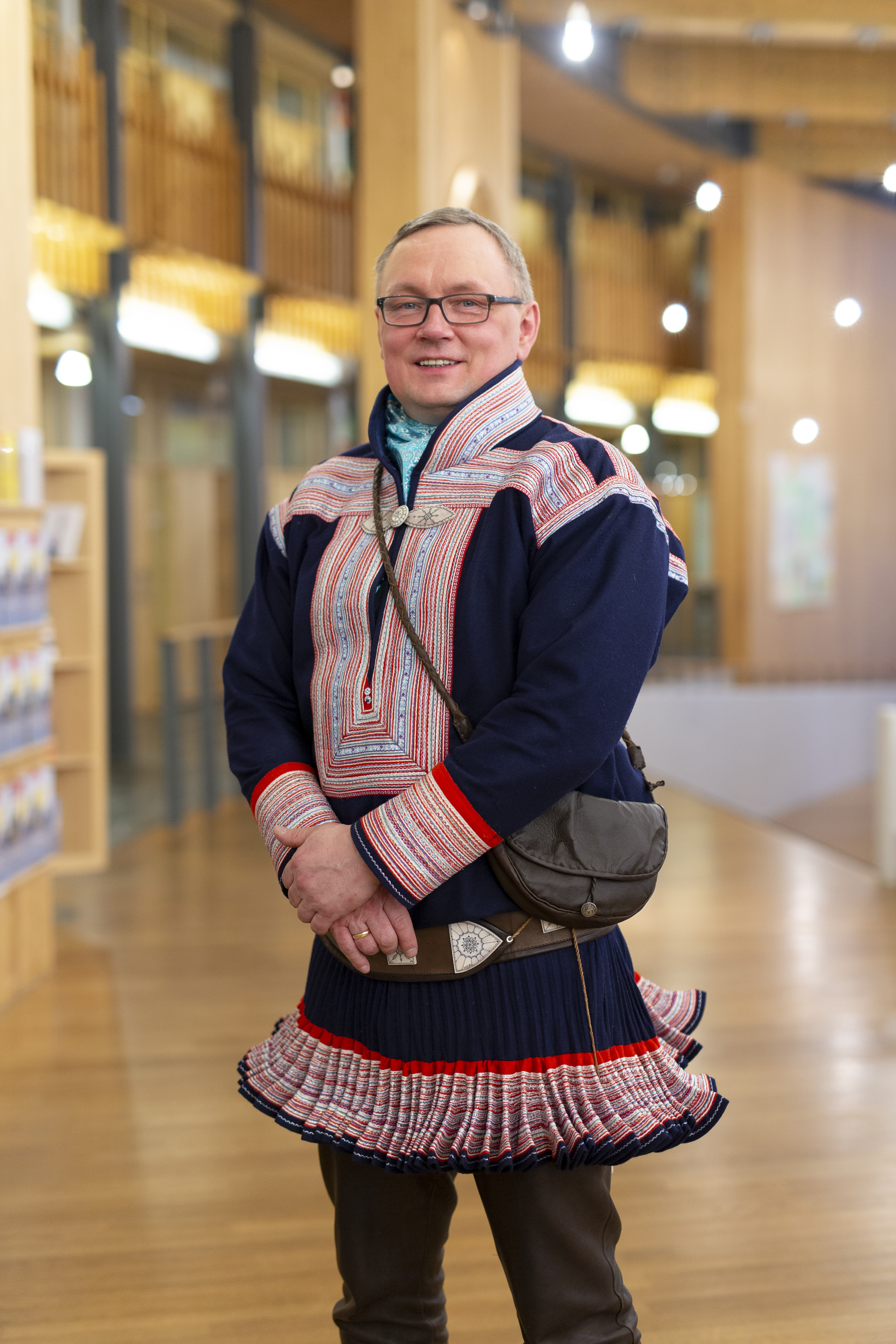
Hans Ole Eira in 2017. He won the yoik category the following year.

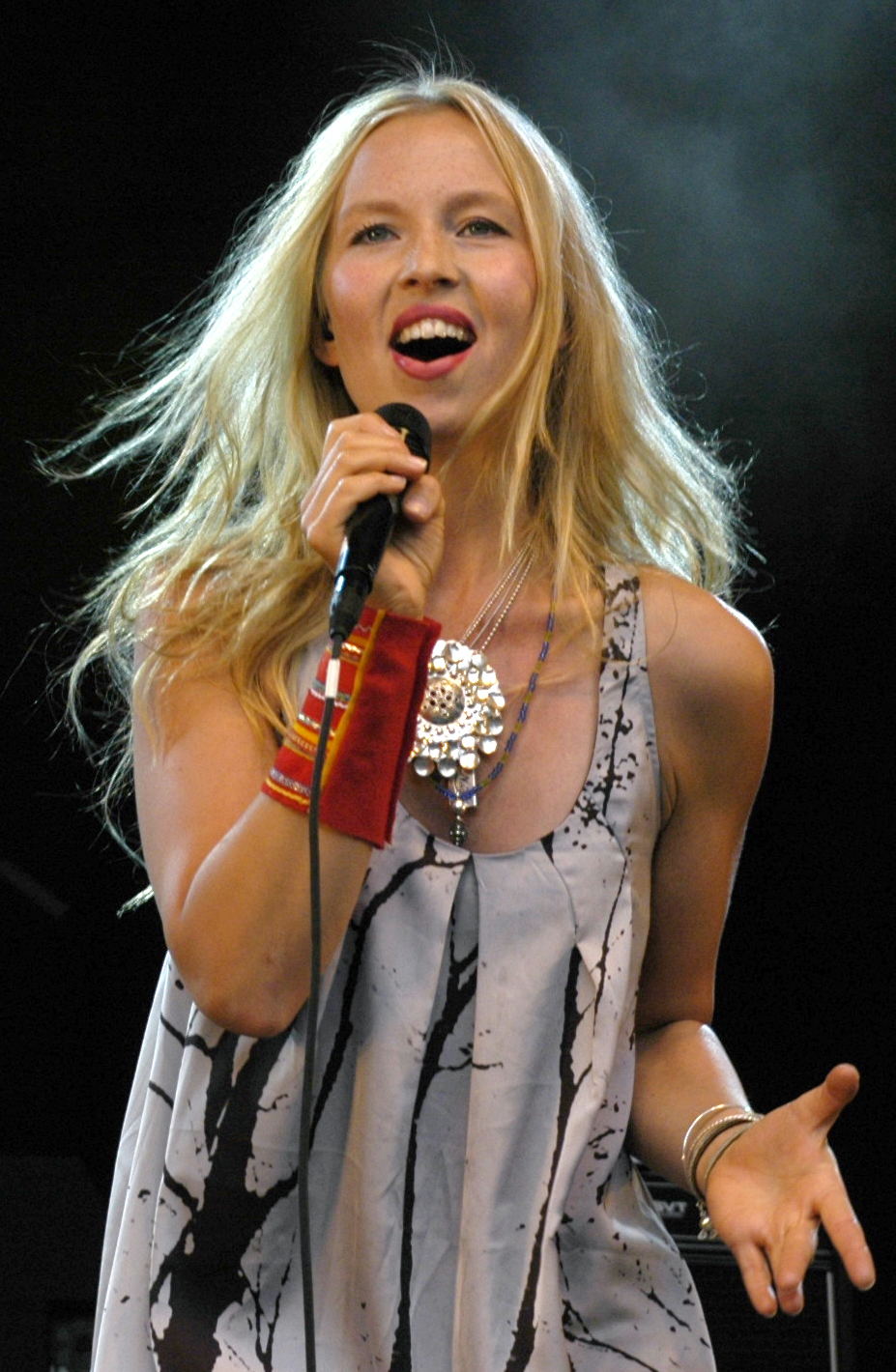
Sofia Jannok in 2010. In 2001, she won the song category of the Sámi Grand Prix together with Anna Kärrstedt. Two years later she won again, this time as a solo act.

The Sámi Grand Prix, often abbreviated as SGP, is a Sámi yoik and song competition organized annually by the Sámi Music Festival organization (Northern Sami: Sámi musihkkafestivála, Norwegian: Samisk Musikkfestival), featuring participants from all corners of Sápmi. While the majority of its participants have been from the Norwegian side of Sápmi, Sámi from the Swedish, Finnish, and Russian sides have been increasingly participating in recent years too.

Each participant submits an original piece to be performed live in an auditorium in Kautokeino during the Sámi Easter Festival. Originally broadcast on the radio in a limited area, they have started to be shown on TV and livestreamed as well and can be watched from anywhere in the world. Listeners and viewers can cast their vote for their favorites in two categories. A combined televoting and jury result is calculated for each participant. The televotes and the jury votes each currently count for 50% of the participant's scores. The participants who receive the most votes in the song category and in the yoik category are declared the winners of these respective categories.

== History ==
The first Sámi Grand Prix was held in 1990 with four participants in the yoik category and eight in the song category. All but one of the contestants was from the Norwegian side of Sápmi and most of these were from Kautokeino Municipality. Each contestant performed a single yoik or song. The winning yoik was Báktevári searat, performed by Johan Anders Eira. The winning song was Muital midjiide, performed by Ellen and Magnus Vuolab of the band Sáve.

In 1993, the Áillohaš Music Award was created. It has been awarded every year since then, including 2020, to a Sámi musician to honor their contributions to the diverse world of Sámi music. The first recipient of this award was Mari Boine.

Since 2001, a CD album has been made of the competitors' performances each year, except for in 2014. That year's album was not released until the following year, when it was published in conjunction with the 2015 competition as a double CD.

Sámi Grand Prix had been held every year until 2020, when the entire Sámi Easter Festival was cancelled due to the uncertainty caused by the COVID-19 pandemic and the various restrictions imposed by the governments of the countries the participants live in. Even though the festival was cancelled, the 2020 Áillohaš Music Award was still awarded to an accomplished Sámi musician, this time to SlinCraze, a Sámi rapper who has spent more than 15 years so far pioneering new ways to use Northern Sámi in music.

The following year, the contestants from the cancelled contest were automatically entered into the 2021 edition of the Sámi Grand Prix. Due to the ongoing pandemic, the contest was held without a live show and the contestants' prerecorded performances were instead broadcast online.

== Format ==
The Sámi Grand Prix has two separate categories for competitors: a yoik category and a song category. Every year, participants compete in these two categories with unpublished, original pieces. At first, the number of yoikers and singers varied, but nowadays the contest is open to 10 individual yoikers and 6 singers or bands. The winner of each category receives a monetary prize of 20,000 Norwegian crowns, a diploma, and a stipend to be used for organizing and performing a concert on the main stage during the following year's Sámi Easter Festival.

In spite of its name, the yoik category is not limited to yoiks. Competitors in this category can also participate with other traditional vocal melodies such as the Inari Saami livđe, the Skolt Saami leuʹdd, and Southern Saami vuelie. As is traditional, these are unaccompanied by instrumental music. If the competitor wishes to use instrumental music, they must compete in the song category.

The song category is not restricted to a certain genre, but any lyrics in the songs must be in one of the Saami languages. Since 2006, the winner of this category has goes on to compete in what was then called Liet-Lávlut, a music competition for minority languages in Europe. Since the European competition has not been held every year, not every winner of the song category has been able to represent Sápmi in the competition.

== Sámi Grand Prix winners ==
=== Winners of the yoik category ===
Year	Country	Artist(s)	Yoik
1990	Norway	Johan Anders Eira	Báktevári searat
1991	Norway	Anders Nils J. Eira	Anders Nils Eira
1992	Norway	Anders Nils J. Eira	Johan M. Kemi
1993	Norway	Marit Gaup Eira	Mihkkal Juhán
1994	Norway	Anders Aslak N. Eira	Mathis Rasmus
1995	Norway	Anders Aslak N. Eira	Nils Lars
1996	Norway	Anders P. Bongo	Mikkel Ánná
1997	Norway	Marit Gaup Eira	Hilbon Májjáš
1998	Norway	Nils Jørgen Utsi	John Máhtte
1999	Norway	Berit Anne Oskal Kemi	Dovnnas luohtái
2000	Sweden	Lars-Ánte Kuhmunen	Gabna duottar
2001	Russia	Anfissa Agueva	Meleš
2002	Norway	Ellen Oskal	Ellen Sara Oskal Gaup
2003	Norway	Marit Gaup Eira	John Martin
2004	Norway	John Mathis Utsi	Issát Ánte
2005	Norway	Anne Berit Peltoperä and Solveig Skum Solbakken	Áinnut
2006	Finland	Anna-Reetta Niemelä	Golleeatnama mánná
2007	Norway	Anne Berit Peltoperä	Helene
2008	Norway	Ánte Niillas N. Bongo	Sara Inga
2009	Norway	Inga Biret Márjá Triumf and Ann Caroline Eira	Johan Martin Eira
2010	Norway	John Mathis A. Utsi	Rásttoš Jovnna
2011	Norway	Jan Ole Hermansen	Inga Karita
2012	Norway	Marit Kristine H Sara	Máhtte Ánte
2013	Norway	Per Bueng	Kate Heidi
2014	Sweden	Jörgen Stenberg	Nejla
2015	Norway	Johan Anders Bær	Skomáhkár Ánde
2016	Norway	Johan Ivvár Gaup	Mikkel Andreas
2017	Norway	John-André Eira	Svein Egil Hætta
2018	Norway	Hans Ole Eira	Mina Helene
2019	Norway	Kim Hallgeir Berg	John Heandarat
2020	No winners. Cancelled due to the COVID-19 pandemic		
2021	Norway	Máhtte Ánte J. Sara	Karen Marianne
2022	Sweden	Jörgen Stenberg	Skilgget
2023	Sweden	Saara Hermansson	Goeksege
2024	Sweden	Nils-Ove Kuorak	Njealječalmmát
2025	Norway	Oscaal	Sávrrimus
2026	Norway	Ánte Niillas Bongo	Nášša álddut

=== Winners of the song contest ===
Year	Country	Artist(s)	Song
1990	Norway	Sáve	"Muital midjiide"
1991	Norway	Marit Elisabeth Hætta Øverli	"Jáddá go beaivi?"
1992	Norway	Audhild Valkeinen	"Máná eallinmokta"
1993	Norway	Ann-Mari Andersen	"Ráhkisvuohta seamma lea"
1994	Norway/ Finland	Inger Marie Gaino Nilut and Niko Valkeapää	"Duinna gávnnadit"
1995	Finland	Niko Valkeapää	"Vádjolus"
1996	Norway	Nils Henrik Buljo	"Go beaivváš badjána"
1997	Norway	Anne Inger and Marit Elisabeth Eira	"Don"
1997	Norway	Berit Sara	"Min duoddarat"
1998	Norway	Anja Vesterheim	"Guorus váibmu"
1999	Norway	Anja Vesterheim	"Boares muitu"
2000	Norway	Marit Susanne Utsi	"Duinna"
2001	Sweden	Sofia och Anna	"Meahci mánná"
2002	Russia	Elvira Galkina	"Immel agk"
2003	Sweden	Sofia Jannok	"Liekkas"
2004	Sweden	Johan Kitti	"Eŋgelat lávllodit"
2005	Finland	Poppoo	"Giella ii leat jáddan"
2006	Norway/ Sweden	Johan Kitti and Ellen Sara Bæhr	"Luđiin muitalan"
2007	Sweden	Ola Stinnerbom	"Snowflow"
2008	Norway	Elin Kåven	"Áibbas jaska"
2009	Finland	SomBy	"Ii iđida"
2010	Sweden	Pia-Maria Holmgren	"Geaidnu"
2011	Norway	Rolffa	"Gulatgo Mu?"
2012	Norway	Inger Karoline Gaup	"Oainnát go?"
2013	Sweden	Melina Kuhmunen	"Árran"
2014	Finland	Aila-duo	"Naharij kandâ"
2015	Norway	Nils Henrik Buljo	"1+1"
2016	Norway	Ella Marie Hætta Isaksen	"Luoddaearru"
2017	Norway	Inger Marie Gaino Nilut	"Min duovdagat"
2018	Norway	Inger Karoline Gaup	"Oahppan lean"
2019	Sweden	Saara Hermansson	"Mov laavlome"
2020	No winners. Cancelled due to the COVID-19 pandemic		
2021	Norway/ Finland	Lávre & Hilda	"Jođi"
2022	Finland	Ingá-Máret Gaup-Juuso	"Dovdameahttumii"
2023	Norway	Mihka and Andreas	"Ále guođe mu"
2024	Norway	Bycecilia	"Mannem åajaldahteme"
2025	Norway	Piera Eira feat. Máijá	"Dálkkiid čađa"
2026	Norway	ELLINOR	"Du Dušsi"

== The Áillohaš Music Award ==
The Áillohaš Music Award is an annual Sámi music award created to commerorate Nils-Aslak Áillohaš Valkeapää's 50th birthday in 1993. The winner of the award is announced on Holy Saturday during the Sámi Easter Festival. It is conferred by Kautokeino Municipality, and the Kautokeino Sámi Association. The winner receives a monetary prize of 20,000 Norwegian crowns, a diploma, a piece of art, and a two-week stay at Lásságámmi.
