= Š (magazine) =

Sámi youth magazine

Š Nuoraidmagasiidna
- Editor: Áslat Issát Eira (2025– )
- Categories: youth
- Frequency: quarterly
- Publisher: Iđut AS
- First issue: 1993
- Country: Norway
- Based in: Billávuotna
- Language: Northern Sámi, Southern Sámi, Lule Sámi, Norwegian
- Website: ungdomsmagasin.no
- ISSN: 0804-5143

Š Nuoraidmagasiidna (Š Youth Magazine), typically referred to simply as Š, is a Sámi quarterly magazine focused on music, movies, sports, and youth culture. Founded in 1993, it is published by Iđut AS in Billávuotna, Norway, although it is available across Sápmi. In 2025, Áslat Issát Eira took over as editor-in-chief from Niels Ovllá Oskal Dunfjell, who had been editor-in-chief for 13 years. Š is primarily written in Northern Sámi, but it also includes articles in Southern Sámi, Lule Sámi, and Norwegian. It is distributed for free to eighth-grade students across Norway, as well as to students studying Sámi languages. The magazine is active on both Facebook and Instagram, and in 2021 launched a website offering content in Sámi languages, as well as Norwegian.
