= Ann-Mari Andersen =

- Born: 1 December 1969 (age 56); Kautokeino, Finnmark, Norway
- Occupations: Singer; songwriter
- Instruments: Vocals; guitar

Ann-Mari Andersen (born 1 December 1969) is a Sámi singer and musician from Kautokeino Municipality in Finnmark county, Norway. She won the Sámi Grand Prix in 1993. She has several album releases behind her and sings in a number of genres - everything from hymns to techno-pop. In 2008, she participated in Melodi Grand Prix 2008 with the song "Ándagassii" - the first Sámi-language song in the competition in 28 years, after "Sámiid ædnan" in 1980.

== Background ==
Andersen was born and raised in Kautokeino Municipality in Finnmark. She was nine years old when she started playing the guitar, and she also eventually started learning the piano, but the guitar remained the main instrument. Later, she performed as well alone with her guitar as with a full band.

== Musical career ==
Andersen has been through many musical styles and genres during her career. In her teens, she was involved in everything from children's and youth choirs, to gospel choirs and rock bands. Andersen plays a mix of modern pop combined with ethno and world music, and she sings in both Sámi and English.

In 1993, Andersen participated in the Sámi Grand Prix in Kautokeino with the song "Ráhkisvuohta seamma lea", and won. The victory gave her the motivation to continue working with music. In 2000, Andersen was engaged for a period at the Beaivváš Sámi Našunálateáhter. The theater staged a musical cabaret with the well-known director Nils Gaup as guide. The cabaret was followed by performances and tours both in Norway and Finland. Andersen became known to a larger audience in 2008, when she participated in the Melodi Grand Prix with the song "Ándagassii". She won the dolphin final in Stavanger and reached the final in Oslo Spektrum. The song was the first Sámi song in the competition in 28 years.

== Personal life ==
Andersen grew up bilingual with Norwegian being her more fluent language. She speaks Norwegian in her everyday life, but sings in Sámi.

== Discography ==
- Ija hearva (album) – 2003 – Guldal REC
- Juovlaráfi (EP) – 2005 – Guldal REC
- Du lahka (single) – 2007 – Guldal REC
- Ándagassii (album) – 2009 – Guldal REC
- Hosianna! (album) – 2011 – Guldal REC
