= Zine (songwriter) =

French songwriter (born 1979)

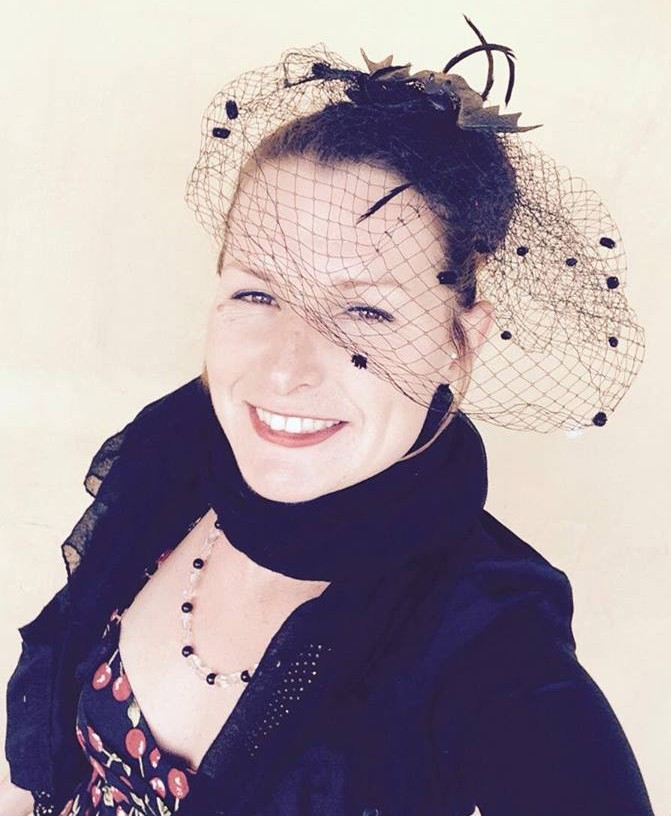
- Zine in 2017

Background information
- Born: Laurence Penzini; 16 January 1979 (age 47); Tangier, Morocco
- Genres: Chanson
- Occupations: Teacher; singer; songwriter
- Instruments: Acoustic guitar; accordion
- Years active: 1999–present
- Website: zine.fr

Laurence Penzini (born 16 January 1979), known professionally as Zine, is a French songwriter from Nice.

== Life ==
Zine was born and spent her first years in Tangier, where her parents lived. Her father is from Corsica and her mother has roots in the Occitan valleys She arrived in France aged 5, in the Drôme. Her musical background first comes from her parents and from her teacher at the Tangier Montessori school, who was ending the schooldays by grabbing his guitar and singing some songs. She started composing songs at 19, and then spent 2 years on the road to improve her musical bases by visiting Southern France, Poland, Switzerland and the Réunion island, as it is visible in her first recordings.

Zine participated in festivals and international competitions such as the 2009 Liet International (minority language song festival in Leeuwarden) where she represented Occitania, or the in 2008.

Her LP Folie douce was released in 2013 with the help of the Regional Council of Provence-Alpes-Côte d'Azur.

With the help of René Pierre Anfosso, Zine has localised many international standards (John Lennon's "Imagine" became "Pantaia un pauc", Bob Marley's "Redemption Song" became "Cançon per curar", etc.) Her show Salade niçoise presented a score of those adaptations. Zine has worked with other authors: Tarik amirat, René Toscano, Etel Adnan.

As a teacher, Zine is also using her musical skills to teach the regional language and has recorded songs for children. She wrote a song about Testadure, a comics bird created by Olivier Lagrange used in Nice language learning and education.

On 5 August 2016, Zine attended the local gathering to pay a tribute to the victims of the Nice truck attack. She sang "Pantaia un pauc" and "Nissa la bella".

At the end of 2016, she wrote a song in Occitan to express the local artists solidarity with Valley of Roya people help to refugees. In March 2017, she adapted a song of Jacques Dutronc's in Occitan to support the football team of OGC Nice.

In 2018, she published a book with the Occitan text of the covers she uses to sing (including songs of The Eagles, Bob Marley, Tiken Jah Fakoly, John Lennon, Otis Redding, Jacques Brel, and others).

== Discography ==
- Et la joie passera en funambule... sur le fil de la folie douce (2002, 15 tracks, self-produced)
- Cherche (2004, with La Quincaille, 4 tracks, Palhassina Productions)
- Mon Coiffeur (2005, 5 tracks, Gallomusic)
- Folie Douce (2013, 14 tracks, La Candela-Seyrat, available on streaming platforms)
