= South Tyrolean dialect =

South Bavarian dialects of South Tyrol, Italy

South Tyrolean dialects
- Region: South Tyrol
- Native speakers: (undated figure of 300,000)
- Language family: Indo-European: Germanic; West Germanic; High German; Upper German; Bavarian; Southern Bavarian; South Tyrolean dialects
- Writing system: German Alphabet

Language codes
- ISO 639-2: gem
- ISO 639-3: bar
- Glottolog: tyro1234 Tyrol Bavarian
- IETF: bar-u-sd-itbz

South Tyrolean dialects (Standard German: Südtiroler Dialekte; Italian: dialetti Altoatesini) are a set of dialects spoken in the northern Italian province of South Tyrol. They are part of the larger group of Southern Bavarian, with which they share many similarities.

What differentiates South Tyrolean dialects from other Bavarian varieties is primarily the influence of Italian and Ladin on its lexicon.

== Characteristics ==
69.15% of the inhabitants of South Tyrol speak German as their mother tongue. South Tyrolean tends to be used at home or in informal situations, while standard German in its Austrian variant prevails at school, work and for official purposes. As such, this is a medial diglossia, since the spoken language is mainly the dialect, whereas the written language is mainly the Austrian German variety of Standard German.

The South Tyrolean dialects are related to Bavarian. They preserve their specific traits and are basically homogeneous with Northern Tyrolean dialects. However they have absorbed some Italian terms, especially for administrative purposes.

== Vocabulary ==
Vocabulary
South Tyrolean	Standard German	Italian	English
oftramol	manchmal (oft einmal)	talvolta	sometimes
lousn	hören (lauschen)	udire	listen
magari	vielleicht, etwa	magari	maybe
Fraktion	Ortsteil	frazione	hamlet
Kondominium	Mehrfamilienhaus	condominio	condominium/condo (US)
hoi/hoila	hallo	ciao	hello
Rutschelen	Locken	riccioli	curls
Unwolt	Rechtsanwalt	avvocato	lawyer, attorney
Identitätskarte	Personalausweis	carta d'identità	ID card
Eiertreter	Nervensäge	rompiscatole	nuisance
