= Rolffa =

Background information
- Origin: Karasjok, Norway
- Genres: Pop music
- Years active: 2006-present
- Label: Rolffa Records
- Members: Ailo Kemi Gjerpe; Rolf Morten Anti Amundsen; Elle Májjá Klefstad Bær; Nils Mikael Hætta Hansen
- Website: https://www.rolffa.no/

Rolffa (often stylized as rOlfFa) is a sámi pop group from Karasjok, Norway.

== History ==
Rolffa was formed in 2006 when the frontman, Rolf Morten Anti Amundsen, came up with a melody that he felt an urge to write a song out of. He wrote and composed the song in a few hours, which went on the become the title song of their debut-album, Partyjoik.

In 2008, the band released their debut-album Partyjoik.

In 2010 they entered a contest hosted by NRK to make the best cover of the Kaizers Orchestra song "Hjerteknuser", where they won second place. The song went on to become one of Rolffa's most popular songs, and in 2022 they reached number 12 on VG's music charts for 4 weeks.

In 2011 they entered the Sámi Grand Prix, a sámi music competition, and won with the song "Gulatgo Mu"

== Members ==
Current members

- Rolf Morten Anti Amundsen (Vocals)
- Elle Máijá Klefstad Bær (Electric guitar and vocals)
- Ailo Gjerpe (Drums and vocals)
- Nils Mikael Hætta Hansen (Acoustic guitar and vocals)

== Discography ==
=== Albums ===
- Partyjoik (2008)
- Dálveijat (2012)
- Buot - Komplett (2013)
- Nu e d party igjen! (2014)

=== EPs and singles ===
- Hjerteknuser (2010) – single
- Gulatgo mu? (2011) – single
- Geasseijat (2011) – EP
- Bli med oss (2011) – single
- Ealgabivdu (2012) – single
- Ka enn (2012) – single
- Kontrolf Z (2014) – single
- Eplekjekk (2014) – single
- E du med? (2014) – single
- Imellom to evigheter (2015) – single
- Uvær (2021) – single
- Fin (2021) – single
- D e dæ (2022) – single
- Partyjoik (med Staysman) (2022) – single
- Fineste daman (2022) – single
- Vi glemmer alt (2023) – single
- De gærne har det godt (med Sandra Lyng) (2024) - single
- Ingen andre e som du (2025) - single
- Granca (2025) - single
- På'an igjen (2025) - single
- Siste dans (2025) - single
- Jul med Rolffa (2025) - single
