= Márkomeannu =

Sami cultural festival in Norway

Coordinates: 68°31′40″N 16°46′08″E

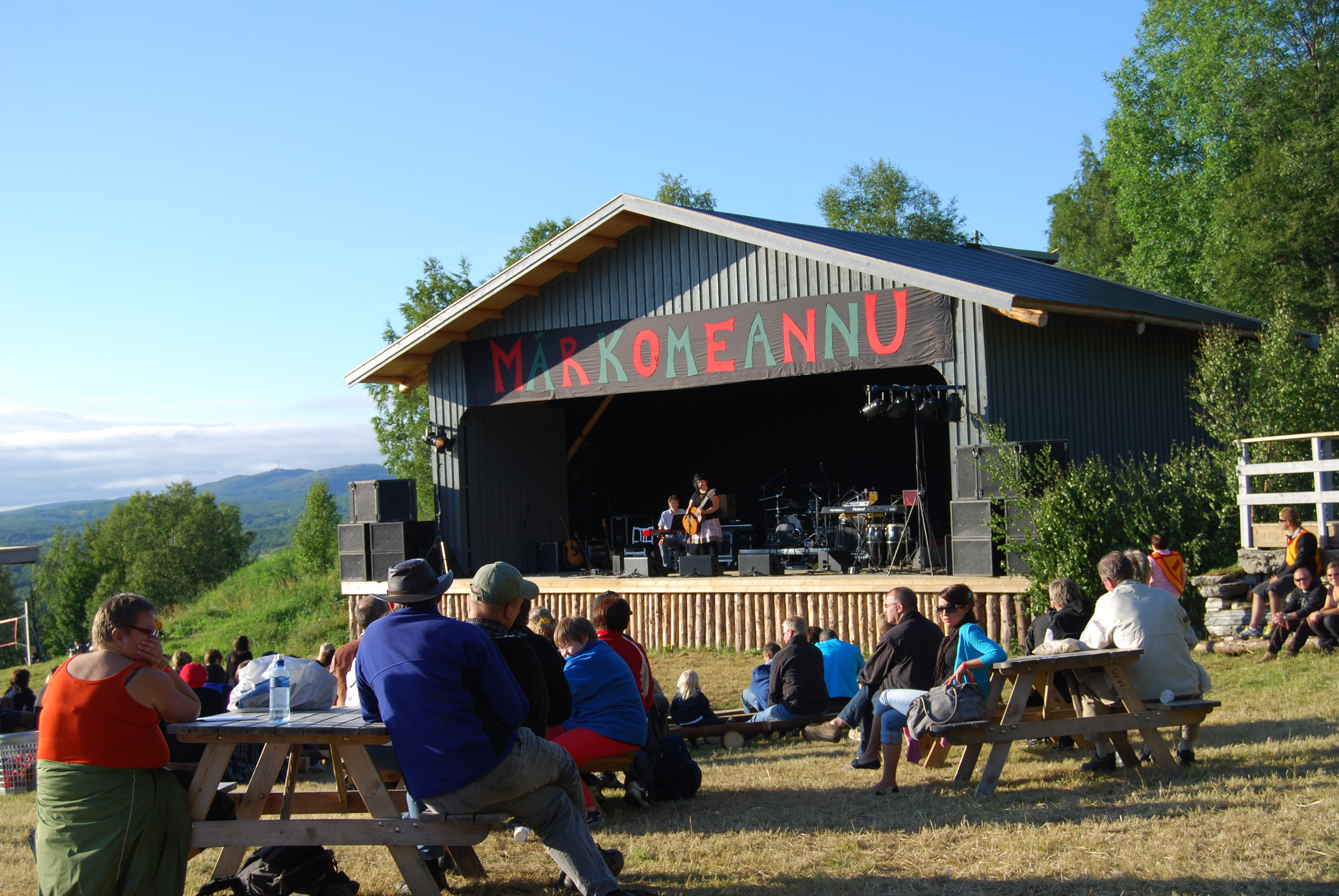
The Márkomeannu festival held in northern Norway.

Márkomeannu is a Sami cultural and music festival in Norway. The festival is held near the border of Tjeldsund Municipality in Troms county and Evenes Municipality in Nordland county. The idea behind Márkomeannu is to celebrate the culture and traditions of the Sámi villages. Until 2006, the festival was organized by the youth association Stuornjárgga Sámenuorak, but starting in 2007, it has been organized by its own association, Márkomeannu Searvi. In the first two years, the festival was held at the zoo near Evenes Airport, but since 2002 has been held at the Gállogieddi Sami open-air museum, east of the village of Vatnjavárri.

Márkomeannu consists of concerts, exhibitions, seminars, and theater. The festival had 2,800 attendees in 2008.

The festival received the Troms County Council's cultural award in 2017.
